= Anthrax discography =

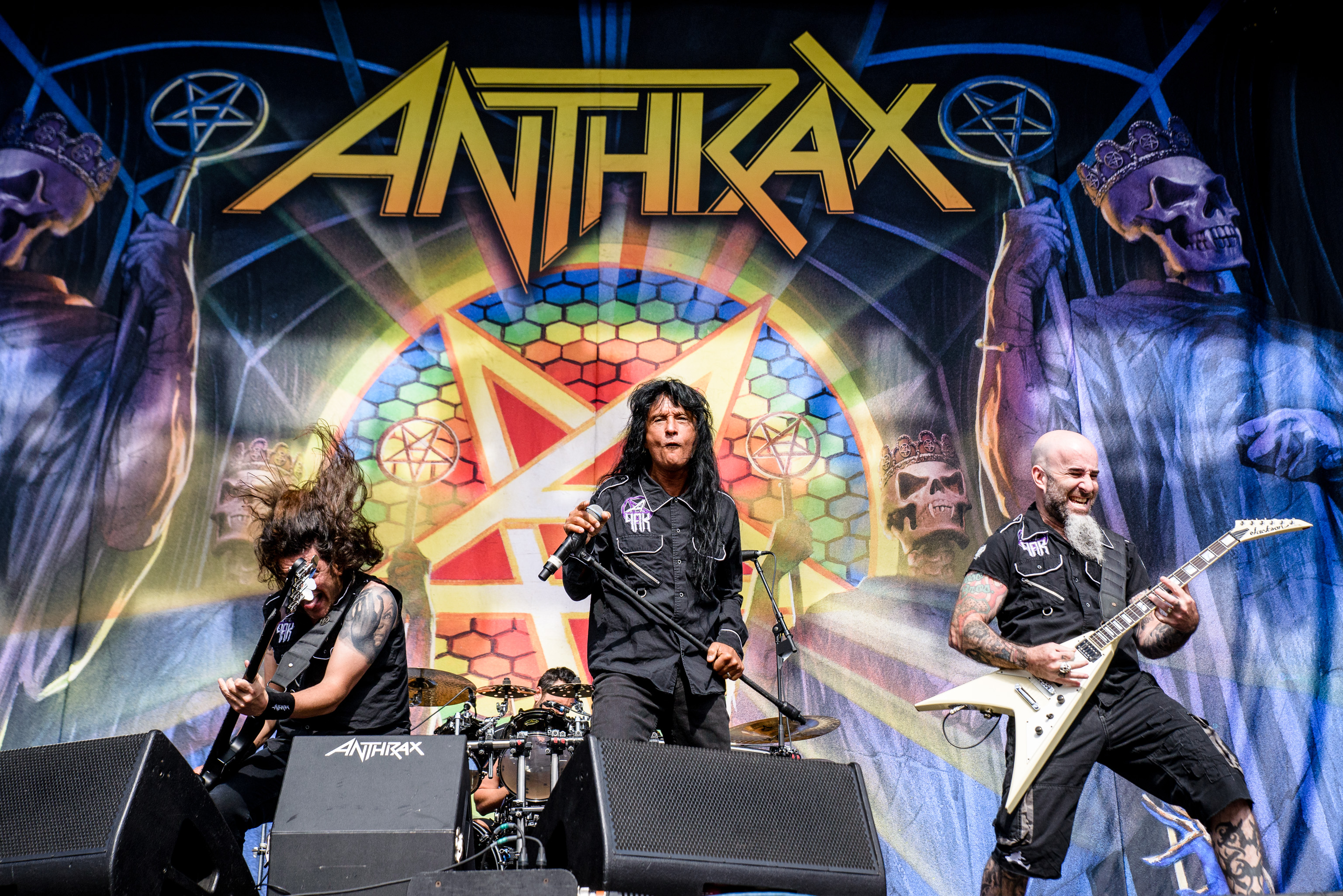
- Anthrax at Rockavaria in Germany in 2016
- Studio albums: 12
- Extended plays: 4
- Live albums: 7
- Compilation albums: 5
- Singles: 26
- Video albums: 6
- Music videos: 26

American thrash metal band Anthrax has released twelve studio albums, seven live albums, seven compilation albums, ten video albums, six extended plays, twenty-six singles, and twenty-six music videos. Anthrax was formed in 1981 by guitarist Scott Ian and bassist Danny Lilker, who picked the band's name from a biology textbook. After releasing its debut Fistful of Metal (1984) on the independent label Megaforce Records, Anthrax signed to major label Island Records. Singer Joey Belladonna and bassist Frank Bello joined the lineup and the band released Spreading the Disease the following year. The band's third studio album Among the Living (1987) was its commercial breakthrough, peaking at number 62 on the Billboard 200 and was certified gold by the Recording Industry Association of America (RIAA) and silver by the British Phonographic Industry (BPI). Its fourth album State of Euphoria (1988) peaked at 31 on the Billboard 200 and received gold certification in the US.Persistence of Time (1990), noted for its darker lyrical content than previous albums, peaked at number 24 on the Billboard 200. The band's sixth studio album Sound of White Noise (1993), its first with singer John Bush, was its highest-charting album in the US, peaking at number seven and received gold certification. Longtime guitarist Dan Spitz left the band shortly after, and drummer Charlie Benante played most of the lead guitar parts on Stomp 442 (1995) until Paul Crook was hired as a touring guitarist. Volume 8: The Threat Is Real (1998) was released by the independent label Ignition Records, whose imminent bankruptcy hurt album sales. Ninth studio album We've Come for You All (2003), first with guitarist Rob Caggiano, entered the Billboard 200 at number 122 but failed to chart on most international markets. Belladonna returned for Worship Music (2011) and For All Kings (2016); which both received favorable reviews.

== Albums ==
=== Studio albums ===
List of studio albums, with selected chart positions and certifications
Title	Album details	Peak chart positions											Sales	Certifications
Title	Album details	US	AUS	CAN	FIN	GER	NLD	NOR	NZ	SWE	SWI	UK	Sales	Certifications
Fistful of Metal	Released: January 28, 1984; Label: Megaforce	—	—	—	—	—	—	—	—	—	—	—		
Spreading the Disease	Released: October 30, 1985; Label: Megaforce/Island	113	—	—	—	—	—	—	—	—	—	—		
Among the Living	Released: March 22, 1987; Label: Megaforce/Island	62	—	—	8	46	46	—	—	43	—	18		UK: Silver; US: Gold
State of Euphoria	Released: September 18, 1988; Label: Megaforce/Island	30	82	87	4	15	57	17	—	21	20	12		CAN: Gold; UK: Silver; US: Gold
Persistence of Time	Released: August 21, 1990; Label: Megaforce/Island	24	30	—	10	35	45	15	4	46	—	13		US: Gold
Sound of White Noise	Released: May 25, 1993; Label: Elektra	7	30	10	9	35	52	—	46	21	40	14	US: 511,284+	CAN: Gold; US: Gold
Stomp 442	Released: October 24, 1995; Label: Elektra	47	49	81	36	—	—	—	—	—	—	77	US: 115,017+	
Volume 8: The Threat Is Real	Released: July 21, 1998; Label: Ignition	118	59	—	38	43	—	—	—	—	—	73	US: 77,878+	
We've Come for You All	Released: May 6, 2003; Label: Sanctuary	122	—	—	—	22	—	—	—	—	—	102	US: 61,561+	
Worship Music	Released: September 13, 2011; Label: Megaforce	12	35	33	6	13	64	—	—	24	28	49	US: 110,000+	
For All Kings	Released: February 26, 2016; Label: Megaforce	9	12	14	4	5	50	25	33	49	8	21		
Cursum Perficio	Released: September 18, 2026; Label: Megaforce/Nuclear Blast	27	24	—	5	5	36	—	35	5	4	46		

=== Live albums ===
List of live albums, with selected chart positions
Title	Album details	Peak chart positions					
Title	Album details	AUS	BEL	FIN	GER	NLD	SWI
Live: The Island Years	Released: April 5, 1994; Label: Island	193	—	—	—	—	—
Music of Mass Destruction	Released: April 20, 2004; Label: Sanctuary	—	—	—	88	—	—
Alive 2	Released: September 20, 2005; Label: Sanctuary	—	—	—	—	—	—
Caught in a Mosh: BBC Live in Concert	Released: January 22, 2007; Label: Universal	—	—	—	—	—	—
The Big 4 Live from Sofia, Bulgaria (with Metallica, Slayer, and Megadeth)	Released: October 29, 2010; Label: Warner Bros.	71	73	31	59	75	63
Chile on Hell	Released: September 16, 2014; Label: Nuclear Blast	—	—	—	—	—	—
Kings Among Scotland	Released: April 27, 2018; Label: Nuclear Blast	—	—	—	51	—	—
XL	Released: July 22, 2022; Label: Nuclear Blast	—	—	—	62	—	91
"—" denotes a recording that did not chart or was not released in that territory.

=== Compilation albums ===
List of compilation albums, with selected chart positions and certifications
Title	Album details	Peak chart positions				Certifications
Title	Album details	US	AUS	CAN	UK	Certifications
Attack of the Killer B's	Released: June 25, 1991; Label: Island	27	50	45	13	CAN: Gold; US: Gold
Return of the Killer A's	Released: November 23, 1999; Label: Beyond	—	—	—	—	
Madhouse: The Very Best of Anthrax	Released: June 26, 2001; Label: Island	—	—	—	—	
The Universal Masters Collection	Released: February 19, 2002; Label: Island	—	—	—	—	
The Greater of Two Evils	Released: November 23, 2004; Label: Sanctuary	—	—	—	—	
Anthrology: No Hit Wonders	Released: September 20, 2005; Label: Island	—	—	—	—	
"—" denotes a recording that did not chart or was not released in that territory.

=== Video albums ===
List of video albums, with selected chart positions and certifications
Title	Album details	Peak chart positions								Certifications
Title	Album details	US Video	AUS	AUT	GER	JPN	NLD	NZ	UK	Certifications
Return of the Killer A's: Video Collection	Released: November 23, 1999; Label: Beyond	—	—	—	—	—	—	—	—	
Music of Mass Destruction	Released: April 20, 2004; Label: Sanctuary	—	—	—	88	—	—	—	—	
Alive 2: The DVD	Released: September 20, 2005; Label: Sanctuary	—	—	—	—	—	—	—	—	
Anthrology: No Hit Wonders - The Videos	Released: September 20, 2005; Label: Island Def Jam	—	—	—	—	—	—	—	—	
The Big 4 Live from Sofia, Bulgaria (with Metallica, Slayer, and Megadeth)	Released: October 29, 2010; Label: Universal Music	1	1	3	4	6	7	1	1	RIAA: 2× Platinum; ARIA: 2× Platinum; PMB: Platinum; BVMI: Gold; RMNZ: Gold; ZPAV: 3× Platinum
Chile on Hell	Released: September 16, 2014; Label: Megaforce	—	—	—	—	—	—	—	—	
Kings Among Scotland	Released: April 27, 2018; Label: Nuclear Blast	—	—	—	51	—	—	—	—	
"—" denotes a recording that did not chart or was not released in that territory.

== Extended plays ==
List of extended plays, with selected chart positions and certifications
Title	EP details	Peak chart positions					Certifications
Title	EP details	US	NLD	NZ	SWE	UK	Certifications
Armed and Dangerous	Released: February 1985; Label: Megaforce	—	—	—	—	—	
I'm the Man	Released: 1987; Label: Island	53	—	21	42	20	MC: Gold; RIAA: Platinum
Penikufesin	Released: August 1989; Label: Island	—	51	—	—	—	
Anthems	Released: March 19, 2013; Label: Megaforce	52	—	—	—	—	
"—" denotes a recording that did not chart or was not released in that territory.

== Singles ==
List of singles, with selected chart positions, showing year released and album name
Title	Year	Peak chart positions						Album
Title	Year	US Rock	US Main.	AUS	NLD	NZ	UK	Album
"Soldiers of Metal"	1983	—	—	—	—	—	—	Fistful of Metal
"Madhouse"	1985	—	—	—	—	—	129	Spreading the Disease
"I Am the Law"	1987	—	—	—	93	—	32	Among the Living
"Indians"	1987	—	—	—	—	—	44	Among the Living
"Make Me Laugh"	1988	—	—	—	—	—	26	State of Euphoria
"Antisocial"	1988	—	—	166	—	—	44	State of Euphoria
"Got the Time"	1990	—	—	142	—	—	16	Persistence of Time
"In My World"	1990	—	—	—	—	—	29	Persistence of Time
"Belly of the Beast"	1990	—	—	—	—	—	—	Persistence of Time
"Bring the Noise" (with Public Enemy)	1991	—	—	—	—	10	14	Attack of the Killer B's
"Only"	1993	—	26	101	48	—	36	Sound of White Noise
"Room for One More"	1993	—	—	—	—	—	—	Sound of White Noise
"Black Lodge"	1993	—	38	—	—	—	53	Sound of White Noise
"Hy Pro Glo"	1994	—	—	—	—	—	—	Sound of White Noise
"Fueled"	1995	—	—	—	—	—	—	Stomp 442
"Nothing"	1996	—	—	51	—	—	89	Stomp 442
"Bordello of Blood"	1996	—	—	—	—	—	—	Bordello of Blood
"Inside Out"	1998	—	—	—	—	—	95	Volume 8: The Threat Is Real
"Crush"	1998	—	—	—	—	—	—	Volume 8: The Threat Is Real
"Piss N' Vinegar"	1998	—	—	—	—	—	—	Volume 8: The Threat Is Real
"Born Again Idiot"	1998	—	—	—	—	—	—	Volume 8: The Threat Is Real
"Ball of Confusion"	1999	—	—	—	—	—	—	Return of the Killer A's
"Taking the Music Back"	2003	—	—	—	—	—	—	We've Come for You All
"Safe Home"	2004	—	—	—	—	—	—	We've Come for You All
"What Doesn't Die"	2004	—	—	—	—	—	—	We've Come for You All
"Fight 'Em 'Til You Can't"	2011	—	—	—	—	—	—	Worship Music
"The Devil You Know"	2011	28	33	—	—	—	—	Worship Music
"In the End"	2011	—	—	—	—	—	—	Worship Music
"I'm Alive"	2012	26	29	—	—	—	—	Worship Music
"Neon Knights"	2014	—	—	—	—	—	—	Ronnie James Dio - This Is Your Life
"Evil Twin"	2016	—	—	—	—	—	—	For All Kings
"Breathing Lightning"	2016	—	33	—	—	—	—	For All Kings
"Monster at the End"	2016	—	—	—	—	—	—	For All Kings
"It's For the Kids"	2026	—	—	—	—	—	—	Cursum Perficio
"—" denotes a recording that did not chart or was not released in that territory.

== Music videos ==
List of music videos, showing year released and director
Title	Year	Director(s)	Album
"Metal Thrashing Mad"	1984	—N/a	Fistful of Metal
"Madhouse"	1985	Amos Poe	Spreading the Disease
"Indians"	1987	Jean Pellerin	Among the Living
"I'm the Man"	1987	John Mills	I'm The Man
"Caught in a Mosh" (version 1)	1987	John Mills	Among The Living
"I Am the Law"	1987	John Mills	Among The Living
"Among the Living"	1987	John Mills	Among The Living
"Gung-Ho" (Live)	1988	John Mills	Spreading the Disease
"Antisocial"	1988	John Mills	State Of Euphoria
"Who Cares Wins"	1988	Paul Rachman	State Of Euphoria
"In My World"	1990	Ian Fletcher	Persistence of Time
"Got the Time"	1990	Parris Mayhew	Persistence of Time
"Belly of the Beast"	1991	Ian Fletcher	Persistence of Time
"Bring the Noise" (with Public Enemy)	1991	Mick Mayhew, Parris Mayhew	Attack of the Killer B's
"Only"	1993	Paul Elledge	Sound of White Noise
"Black Lodge"	1993	Mark Pellington	Sound of White Noise
"Room for One More"	1994	George Dougherty	Sound of White Noise
"Hy Pro Glo"	1994	George Dougherty	Sound of White Noise
"Fueled"	1995	Marcos Siega	Stomp 442
"Nothing"	1996	Marcos Siega	Stomp 442
"Inside Out"	1998	Marcos Siega	Volume 8: The Threat Is Real
"Safe Home"	2003	Robert Carlsen	We've Come For You All
"Taking the Music Back"	2003	—N/a	We've Come For You All
"What Doesn't Die"	2004	Michael John Sarna	We've Come For You All
"Deathrider"	2004	—N/a	The Greater of Two Evils
"Caught in a Mosh" (version 2)	2005	Dale Resteghini	Alive 2
"The Devil You Know"	2012	N/A	Worship Music
"A Skeleton In the Closet" (Live)	2014	N/A	Chile On Hell
"Evil Twin" (Lyric Video)	2015	N/A	For All Kings
"Breathing Lightning" (Lyric Video)	2016	N/A	For All Kings
"Blood Eagle Wings"	2016	Jack Bennett	For All Kings
"Zero Tolerance" (Lyric Video)	2016	N/A	For All Kings
"Monster at the End"	2016	N/A	For All Kings
"Suzerain" (Lyric Video)	2016	N/A	For All Kings
"In The End"	2017	Matt Hanaran	Worship Music
"It's for the Kids"	2026	Don Argott	Cursum Perficio
"The Edge of Perfection"	2026	Joel Harlow	Cursum Perficio
"Everybody's Got a Plan"	2026	—N/a	Cursum Perficio
"Cursum Perficio"	2026	Don Argott	Cursum Perficio
