= The Greater of Two Evils =

2004 studio album by Anthrax

- Cover art by Shepard Fairey

Remix album / studio album of re-recorded songs by Anthrax
- Released: November 23, 2004
- Recorded: January 24–25, 2004
- Studio: Avatar, New York City
- Genre: Thrash metal
- Length: 73:04
- Label: Sanctuary; Nuclear Blast
- Producer: Anthrax

Anthrax chronology
Music of Mass Destruction (2004)	The Greater of Two Evils (2004)	Anthrology: No Hit Wonders (1985–1991) (2005)

Professional ratings
Review scores
Source	Rating
AllMusic	4/5 stars
Classic Rock	3/5 stars
Collector's Guide to Heavy Metal	7/10
Encyclopedia of Popular Music	4/5 stars

The Greater of Two Evils is a studio album by American heavy metal band Anthrax. It was released in November 2004 via Sanctuary.

The album is made up of 14 songs from the band's early era that were first released between 1983 and 1990. These tracks were re-recorded by Anthrax's 2004 lineup, with vocalist John Bush recording new versions of songs originally sung by Neil Turbin and Joey Belladonna. The final track listing was decided by a vote on the band's website. The track list was then recorded by the band "live" in the studio over two days. The album was originally going to be named Metallum Maximum Aeturnum, with possible plans to change it to Old School, New School, Our School: Metallum Maximum Aeturnum or Metal Thrashing Mad: Metallum Maximum Aeturnum. The album sleeve features liner notes by comedian and Anthrax fan Brian Posehn.

The album did not chart in the US, selling 3,421 copies in its first week.

The Greater of Two Evils is the final full-length Anthrax release prior to the band's reunion with Belladonna and guitarist Dan Spitz.

== Track listing ==
No.	Title	Writer(s)	Original album	Length
1.	"Deathrider"	Charlie Benante, Scott Ian, Dan Lilker, Dan Spitz, Neil Turbin	Fistful of Metal	3:04
2.	"Metal Thrashing Mad"	Benante, Ian, Lilker, Spitz, Turbin	Fistful of Metal	2:47
3.	"Caught in a Mosh"	Anthrax	Among the Living	5:27
4.	"A.I.R."	Anthrax	Spreading the Disease	6:21
5.	"Among the Living"	Anthrax	Among the Living	5:52
6.	"Keep It in the Family"	Anthrax	Persistence of Time	7:25
7.	"Indians"	Anthrax	Among the Living	6:38
8.	"Madhouse"	Anthrax	Spreading the Disease	4:26
9.	"Panic"	Ian, Lilker, Turbin	Fistful of Metal	3:35
10.	"I Am the Law"	Anthrax, Lilker	Among the Living	6:03
11.	"Belly of the Beast"	Anthrax	Persistence of Time	5:42
12.	"Efilnikufesin (N.F.L.)"	Anthrax	Among the Living	5:57
13.	"Be All, End All"	Anthrax	State of Euphoria	6:29
14.	"Gung-Ho" "Lone Justice" (hidden track)	Ian, Lilker, Turbin; Anthrax	Spreading the Disease; Spreading the Disease	8:48
Total length:				73:04

=== Bonus disc (Japanese edition) ===
The following tracks are available on a 2-disc Japanese version sold in other countries as an import.

No.	Title	Writer(s)	Original album	Length
1.	"Anthrax"	Ian, Lilker, Turbin	Fistful of Metal	3:25
2.	"Lone Justice"	Anthrax	Spreading the Disease	4:34
3.	"In My World"	Anthrax	Persistence of Time	6:29
Total length:				87:32

== Trivia ==
- The Japanese katakana writing on the front cover says: スラッシュ メタル, literally Surasshu Metaru (a transliteration of "thrash metal").
- On the original version of the album, "Lone Justice" appears as a hidden track. It begins after "Gung-Ho" ends, and is followed by the sound of "Lone Justice" being rewound. The song was included due to what seemed to be a strong demand for the track to be recorded by the members of the band's official message board, although many on the board claimed that the high votes for the song were a result of internet sabotage of the voting process. This addition to the album was not included on the Japanese edition, which featured an additional disc, on which "Lone Justice" was featured as a separate track.
- "Efilnikufesin (N.F.L.)" is listed as N.F.L. on the cover of the album.

== Personnel ==
- John Bush – lead vocals
- Rob Caggiano – lead guitar, rhythm guitar on "Panic" and "Anthrax"
- Scott Ian – rhythm guitar, backing vocals, lead guitar on "Panic" and "Anthrax"
- Frank Bello – bass, backing vocals
- Charlie Benante – drums

== Charts ==
Chart (2004)	Peak position
UK Rock & Metal Albums (OCC)	30
