= The Big Four: Live from Sofia, Bulgaria =

Video by Metallica, Slayer, Megadeth and Anthrax
- Released: October 29, 2010
- Recorded: June 22, 2010
- Venues: Vasil Levski National Stadium (Sofia, Bulgaria)
- Genres: Thrash metal; heavy metal
- Length: 317:22
- Labels: Warner Bros. (U.S.); Vertigo/Mercury (Europe)

Metallica video chronology
Orgullo, Pasión, y Gloria: Tres Noches en la Ciudad de México (2009)	The Big Four: Live from Sofia, Bulgaria (2010)	Quebec Magnetic (2012)

Metallica chronology
Six Feet Down Under (2010)	The Big Four: Live from Sofia, Bulgaria (2010)	Six Feet Down Under Part II (2010)

Slayer video chronology
Still Reigning (2004)	The Big Four: Live from Sofia, Bulgaria (2010)

Slayer chronology
The Vinyl Conflict (2010)	The Big Four: Live from Sofia, Bulgaria (2010)	Repentless (2015)

Megadeth video chronology
Rust in Peace: Live (2010)	The Big Four: Live from Sofia, Bulgaria (2010)	Countdown to Extinction: Live (2013)

Megadeth chronology
Rust in Peace Live (2010)	The Big Four: Live from Sofia, Bulgaria (2010)	Thirteen (2011)

Anthrax video chronology
Anthrology: No Hit Wonders (1985–1991) (2005)	The Big Four: Live from Sofia, Bulgaria (2010)

Anthrax chronology
Caught in a Mosh: BBC Live in Concert (2007)	The Big Four: Live from Sofia, Bulgaria (2010)	Worship Music (2011)

The Big Four: Live from Sofia, Bulgaria is a live video with performances by Metallica, Slayer, Megadeth, and Anthrax, the "big four" of American thrash metal. The concert took place on June 22, 2010, at the Sonisphere Festival at Vasil Levski National Stadium, Sofia, Bulgaria. It was shown at 450 movie theaters in the United States and over 350 movie theaters across Europe, Canada, and Latin America on June 22, 2010.

Reviews of the DVD were mostly favorable. Websites such as AllMusic and About.com were positive, though Blogcritics gave the DVD a mixed review. The DVD peaked at number one on the United States, United Kingdom, Austrian, and Canadian charts, and also charted on five other charts. It was certified gold in Germany, and provided Slayer with its first platinum certification.

== Background and release ==
On June 16, 2010, at the Sonisphere Festival at Bemowo Airport in Warsaw, Poland, the "big four" of American thrash metal—Metallica, Slayer, Megadeth, and Anthrax—performed together for the first time. The bandmembers (except for Slayer's Jeff Hanneman) were first photographed together on the previous day. Their live concert in Bulgaria's capital, on June 22, was for one night only. Directed by Nick Wickham, the event was filmed and transmitted via satellite to over 450 movie theaters in the United States and over 350 movie theaters across Europe, Canada, and Latin America, including London's famed Leicester Square. Tickets were made available for around $20 at TheBigFourLive.com, which also listed the theaters where the concert was being screened. Delayed screenings took place in Australia, South Africa and New Zealand.

The film's contents and artwork were revealed on August 25, 2010. A limited-edition guitar pick was unveiled a day after the artwork was revealed. The European release was initially scheduled for October 11, but Metallica later announced on their official site that the European release would be pushed back to October 15, with an International release on October 18, and a North American release on October 19, 2010. On September 15, it was announced that a "super deluxe" limited edition box set would be released on the same date as the regular edition, and a 36-second video preview of the box set was released on September 17. In mid September, publication was postponed further to a European release on October 29, an International release on November 1, and a North American release on November 2, 2010. Four teaser clips from the video were released on October 12, and nine days later, Metallica's performance of "Sad but True", taken from the film, was released. A three-and-a-half-minute trailer was released on September 21, 2010.

The Slayer title card before the band's performance is the only one of the four bands that did not feature their official logo. In addition, all Slayer members (except drummer Dave Lombardo) did not participate in the "Am I Evil?" performance due to lack of interest.

In 2016, Megadeth frontman Dave Mustaine expressed interest in doing more Big Four shows.

== Event dates ==
Date	City	Country	Venue	Boxscore	Attendance
June 16, 2010	Warsaw	Poland	Sonisphere Festival - Lotnisko Bemowo		
June 18, 2010	Jonschwil	Switzerland	Sonisphere Festival - Jonschwil Degenaupark		
June 19, 2010	Milovice	Czech Republic	Sonisphere Festival - Milovice Airport		
June 22, 2010	Sofia	Bulgaria	Sonisphere Festival - Natsionalen stadion Vasil Levski		
June 24, 2010	Athens	Greece	Sonisphere Festival - Terra Vibe Park		
June 26, 2010	Bucharest	Romania	Sonisphere Festival - Complexul expozițional Romexpo		
June 27, 2010	Istanbul	Turkey	Sonisphere Festival - BJK İnönü Stadyumu		
April 23, 2011	Indio, California	United States	Empire Polo Club	$4,793,768	44,205
July 2, 2011	Gelsenkirchen	Germany	Veltins-Arena		
July 3, 2011	Gothenburg	Sweden	Ullevi		56,000
July 6, 2011	Milan	Italy	Fiera Open Air Arena		
July 8, 2011	Knebworth	United Kingdom	Sonisphere Festival - Knebworth House		
July 9, 2011	Amnéville	France	Sonisphere Festival - Snowhall Parc		
September 14, 2011	New York City	United States	Yankee Stadium	$5,371,167	41,762

== Reception ==
Professional ratings
Review scores
Source	Rating
AllMusic	4/5 stars
Blogcritics	4/5 stars
Jukebox Metal	5/5 stars

The album was received positively by music critics. Thom Jurek gave it four out of five stars in his review for AllMusic, and stated that "each [song] is incredibly energetic, clearly riding the crowd excitement of the event, and the performances are stellar without a lapse." He pointed to Anthrax's "Madhouse" and "Antisocial"; Megadeth's "Head Crusher" and the "Peace Sells/Holy Wars Reprise"; Slayer's "Angel of Death", "Seasons in the Abyss", and "Raining Blood"; and Metallica's "Fade to Black", "Creeping Death", "Master of Puppets", and "For Whom the Bell Tolls" as musical highlights, and described the encore performance of "Am I Evil?", in which members of all four bands perform, as "an historic high point."

In a mixed review for Blogcritics, Chris Beaumont summed up that "Watching these promo DVDs makes me want the Blu-ray that much more. The performances are great, the sets are great, and it is hard not to get excited about these guys taking the stage together. This is metal."

Chad Bowar, writing for About.com, said that the concert was "one of the defining moments and biggest events in recent metal history" and commented that the bands "can still put on a great show" despite their age. He distinguished the styles of each band, writing: "Anthrax has a more lighthearted, fun approach, while Megadeth is 100 percent business with very little banter and focus on the music. Slayer has a more ominous vibe, although their evil mystique has lessened over the years. Metallica were very inclusive, with James Hetfield acting as everybody's favorite uncle interacting with the crowd and taking time to soak it all in."

== Charts and certifications ==
=== Album charts ===
Chart (2010)	Peak position
Australian Albums (ARIA)	71
Belgian Albums (Ultratop Wallonia)	73
Canadian Albums (Billboard)	3
Dutch Albums (Album Top 100)	75
Finnish Albums (Suomen virallinen lista)	31
German Albums (Offizielle Top 100)	59
Swiss Music (Schweizer Hitparade)	63

=== Video charts ===
Chart (2010)	Peak position
Australian Video Chart	1
Austrian Video Chart	3
Dutch Video Chart	7
German Video Chart	4
Japanese Video Chart (Oricon)	6
New Zealand Video Chart	1
Switzerland Video Chart	3
UK Music Video Chart	1
US Billboard Music DVD Chart	1

=== Certifications ===
Country	Certification
Australia	2× Platinum
Brazil	Platinum
Germany	Gold
New Zealand	Gold
Poland	3× Platinum
United States	2× Platinum

== Contents ==
- The DVD's contents can be verified by AllMusic and the DVD's notes.

== Track listing ==
Disc 1 ~ Anthrax
No.	Title	Writer(s)	Length
1.	"Caught in a Mosh"	Joey Belladonna, Frank Bello, Charlie Benante, Scott Ian, Dan Spitz	6:04
2.	"Got the Time"	Joe Jackson	3:42
3.	"Madhouse"	Belladonna, Bello, Benante, Ian, Spitz	4:24
4.	"Be All, End All"	Belladonna, Bello, Benante, Ian, Spitz	8:00
5.	"Antisocial"	Bernie Bonvoisin, Norbert Krief	6:37
6.	"Indians"/"Heaven and Hell" (Ronnie James Dio tribute)	Belladonna, Bello, Benante, Ian, Spitz/ Ronnie James Dio, Tony Iommi, Bill Ward, Geezer Butler	10:10
7.	"Medusa"	Belladonna, Bello, Benante, Ian, Spitz, Jon Zazula	5:53
8.	"Only"	Bello, Benante, John Bush, Ian	6:46
9.	"Metal Thrashing Mad"	Benante, Ian, Dan Lilker, Spitz, Neil Turbin	3:27
10.	"I Am the Law"	Belladonna, Bello, Benante, Ian, Lilker, Spitz	8:14
Total length:			1:03:17

Disc 2 ~ Megadeth
No.	Title	Writer(s)	Length
1.	"Holy Wars... The Punishment Due"	Dave Mustaine	6:33
2.	"Hangar 18"	Mustaine	5:04
3.	"Wake Up Dead"	Mustaine	3:44
4.	"Head Crusher"	Mustaine, Shawn Drover	3:18
5.	"In My Darkest Hour"	Mustaine, David Ellefson	5:26
6.	"Skin o' My Teeth"	Mustaine	3:14
7.	"A Tout le Monde"	Mustaine	4:28
8.	"Hook in Mouth"	Mustaine, Ellefson	4:39
9.	"Trust"	Mustaine, Marty Friedman	5:04
10.	"Sweating Bullets"	Mustaine	4:50
11.	"Symphony of Destruction"	Mustaine	4:15
12.	"Peace Sells"/"Holy Wars... the Punishment Due" (Reprise)	Mustaine	10:22
Total length:			1:00:57

Disc 3 ~ Slayer
No.	Title	Writer(s)	Length
1.	"World Painted Blood"	Jeff Hanneman, Tom Araya	6:26
2.	"Jihad"	Hanneman, Araya	4:31
3.	"War Ensemble"	Hanneman, Araya	5:09
4.	"Hate Worldwide"	Kerry King	3:11
5.	"Seasons in the Abyss"	Hanneman, Araya	6:24
6.	"Angel of Death"	Hanneman	5:34
7.	"Beauty Through Order"	Hanneman, Araya	5:11
8.	"Disciple"	Hanneman, King	5:07
9.	"Mandatory Suicide"	Hanneman, Araya	4:14
10.	"Chemical Warfare"	Hanneman, King	5:50
11.	"South of Heaven"	Hanneman, Araya	4:30
12.	"Raining Blood"	Hanneman, King	5:30
Total length:			1:01:37

Disc 4 ~ Metallica - Part. 1
No.	Title	Writer(s)	Length
1.	"Creeping Death"	James Hetfield, Lars Ulrich, Cliff Burton, Kirk Hammett	8:11
2.	"For Whom the Bell Tolls"	Hetfield, Ulrich, Burton	4:29
3.	"Fuel"	Hetfield, Ulrich, Hammett	4:15
4.	"Harvester of Sorrow"	Hetfield, Ulrich	6:18
5.	"Fade to Black"	Hetfield, Ulrich, Burton, Hammett	7:31
6.	"That Was Just Your Life"	Hetfield, Ulrich, Hammett, Robert Trujillo	6:53
7.	"Cyanide"	Hetfield, Ulrich, Hammett, Trujillo	7:16
8.	"Sad but True"	Hetfield, Ulrich	6:33
9.	"Welcome Home (Sanitarium)"	Hetfield, Ulrich, Hammett	6:14
10.	"All Nightmare Long"	Hetfield, Ulrich, Hammett, Trujillo	7:50
Total length:			1:05:30

Disc 5 ~ Metallica - Part. 2
No.	Title	Writer(s)	Length
1.	"One"	Hetfield, Ulrich	8:34
2.	"Master of Puppets"	Hetfield, Ulrich, Burton, Hammett	8:06
3.	"Blackened"	Hetfield, Ulrich, Jason Newsted	7:58
4.	"Nothing Else Matters"	Hetfield, Ulrich	5:56
5.	"Enter Sandman"	Hetfield, Ulrich, Hammett	11:08
6.	"Am I Evil?" (Feat. members of Megadeth, Anthrax, & Dave Lombardo)	Sean Harris, Brian Tatler	6:05
7.	"Hit the Lights"	Hetfield, Ulrich	5:25
8.	"Seek & Destroy"	Hetfield, Ulrich	12:40
Total length:			1:05:52

== Personnel ==
A complete list can be found at AllMusic.

Anthrax

- Joey Belladonna – lead vocals
- Rob Caggiano – lead guitar, backing vocals
- Scott Ian – rhythm guitar, backing vocals
- Frank Bello – bass, backing vocals
- Charlie Benante – drums

Megadeth

- Dave Mustaine – guitars, lead vocals
- Chris Broderick – guitars, backing vocals
- David Ellefson – bass, backing vocals
- Shawn Drover – drums

Slayer

- Tom Araya – bass, vocals
- Kerry King – guitars
- Jeff Hanneman – guitars
- Dave Lombardo – drums

Metallica

- James Hetfield – rhythm guitar, lead vocals, acoustic guitar on "Fade to Black"
- Kirk Hammett – lead guitar, backing vocals
- Robert Trujillo – bass, backing vocals
- Lars Ulrich – drums

Production and assistance

- Warren Lee – bass technician, guitar technician
- Michael Pearce; Philip Richardson – editing
- John Wedge Branon – engineer, production manager, tour manager
- David May – executive producer
- Mark Workman – lighting director
- Doug C. Short and Scott Boculac – Megadeth audio
- Russ Russell; Andy Sneap – mixing
- Ross Halfin – photography
- Jim Parsons – producer
- Chris Blair; Michael McGuire – pyrotechnics
- Mike Osman – sound technician
- Alan Doyle – stage manager
- Chris David – video technician
