= Alive 2 =

Alive 2 (2005)

Live album by Anthrax
- Released: September 20, 2005
- Recorded: June 3, 2005
- Venues: Starland Ballroom (Sayreville, NJ)
- Genre: Thrash metal
- Length: 73:47 (CD); 86:23 (DVD)
- Label: Sanctuary
- Producer: Paul Logus

Anthrax chronology
Anthrology: No Hit Wonders (1985–1991) (2005)	Alive 2 (2005) (2005)	Caught in a Mosh: BBC Live in Concert (2007)

Anthrax video chronology
Rock Legends (2005)	Alive 2 (2005)	Anthrology: No Hit Wonders (1985–1991) (2005)

Professional ratings
Review scores
Source	Rating
AllMusic	4/5 stars

Alive 2 (2005) is the third full-length live album and second full-length live DVD from the band Anthrax. It features the reunion of their lineup from the Among the Living era, including then-former vocalist Joey Belladonna and former guitarist Dan Spitz. The songs included on the disc are taken from Fistful of Metal, their first release, until Persistence of Time (1990), spanning numerous personnel changes.

Unlike the band's previous live release, Music of Mass Destruction, the CD and DVD versions of Alive 2 are sold also separately or in "The Special Edition": in which the CD is referred to as Alive 2: The CD and the DVD is referred to as Alive 2: The DVD.

This album would be the last non-compilation release featuring Dan Spitz, who left the band following the end of Anthrax's reunion tour.

The footage was filmed on June 3, 2005, at the Starland Ballroom in Sayreville, New Jersey.

== Track listing ==
=== The CD ===
1. "Among the Living" – 5:29
2. "Caught in a Mosh" – 5:42
3. "A.I.R." – 6:22
4. "Antisocial" – 6:05
5. "Lone Justice" * – 4:32
6. "Efilnikufesin (N.F.L.)" – 5:59
7. "Deathrider" – 3:37
8. "Medusa" – 4:59
9. "In My World" – 6:09
10. "Indians" – 7:45
11. "Time" – 6:52
12. "Be All, End All" – 7:44
13. "I Am the Law" – 7:04

* Special edition only

=== The DVD ===
1. "Among the Living" – 5:29
2. "Caught In a Mosh" – 5:42
3. "A.I.R." – 6:22
4. "Madhouse" – 6:05
5. "Efilnikufesin (N.F.L.)" – 5:59
6. "Deathrider" – 3:37
7. "Medusa" – 4:59
8. "In My World" – 6:09
9. "Indians" – 7:45
10. "Time" – 6:52
11. "I'm the Man" – 6:31
12. "Be All, End All" – 7:44
13. "I Am the Law" – 7:04

=== DVD additional content ===
- Documentary
- State of Euphoria
- Juliya Interview
- Touring Tales
- The Vaccine

== Personnel ==
- Joey Belladonna – lead vocals
- Dan Spitz – lead guitar, backing vocals
- Scott Ian – rhythm guitar, backing vocals
- Frank Bello – bass, backing vocals
- Charlie Benante – drums
