= Caught in a Mosh: BBC Live in Concert =

Caught in a Mosh:BBC Live in Concert

Live album by Anthrax
- Released: January 22, 2007 (International), November 10, 2009 (U.S.)
- Recorded: February 15, 1987; August 22, 1987
- Venues: Hammersmith Odeon; Donington Festival
- Genre: Thrash metal
- Length: 102:45
- Labels: Island (U.S.), Universal Music (International)
- Producer: Tony Wilson

Anthrax chronology
| Alive 2 (2005) (2005) | Caught in a Mosh:BBC Live in Concert (2007) | The Big Four: Live from Sofia, Bulgaria (2010) |

Professional ratings
Review scores
| Source | Rating |
|---|---|
| AllMusic | 4/5 stars |
| Classic Rock | 7/10 stars |

Caught in a Mosh: BBC Live in Concert is a live album released by the American heavy metal band Anthrax on January 22, 2007, internationally and on November 10, 2009, in the United States. It contains Anthrax's February 15, 1987, show at the Hammersmith Odeon in London (disc 1), as well as their performance at the Monsters of Rock festival at Castle Donington on August 22, 1987, (disc 2).

== Track listing ==
All tracks are written by Anthrax, except where indicated.

Disc one
| No. | Title | Writer(s) | Length |
|---|---|---|---|
| 1. | "A.I.R." | | 6:46 |
| 2. | "Metal Thrashing Mad" | Anthrax, Neil Turbin | 3:11 |
| 3. | "Panic" | Turbin, Scott Ian, Dan Lilker | 3:13 |
| 4. | "The Enemy" | | 6:06 |
| 5. | "I Am the Law" | Anthrax, Lilker | 5:44 |
| 6. | "Madhouse" | | 8:35 |
| 7. | "Howling Furies" | Ian, Lilker | 4:14 |
| 8. | "Medusa" | | 5:09 |
| 9. | "Armed and Dangerous" | Anthrax, Lilker, Turbin | 4:53 |
| 10. | "Sabbath Bloody Sabbath" (Black Sabbath cover) | Tony Iommi, Ozzy Osbourne, Geezer Butler, Bill Ward | 5:28 |
| 11. | "God Save the Queen" (Sex Pistols cover) | Glen Matlock, John Lydon, Paul Cook, Steve Jones | 2:57 |
| 12. | "Gung Ho" | Anthrax, Lilker, Turbin | 5:54 |

- Recorded live at the Hammersmith Odeon on February 15, 1987

Disc two
| No. | Title | Writer(s) | Length |
|---|---|---|---|
| 1. | "Among the Living" | | 4:23 |
| 2. | "Caught in a Mosh" | | 5:10 |
| 3. | "Madhouse" | | 4:01 |
| 4. | "I Am the Law" | Anthrax, Lilker | 5:41 |
| 5. | "Medusa" | | 4:21 |
| 6. | "Indians" | | 5:37 |
| 7. | "God Save the Queen" (Sex Pistols cover) | Matlock, Lydon, Cook, Jones | 3:10 |
| 8. | "A.I.R." | | 4:16 |
| 9. | "I'm the Man" (listed on the cover, but not on the album) | Anthrax, John Rooney |

- Recorded live at Donington on August 22, 1987

== Personnel ==
- Joey Belladonna – lead vocals
- Dan Spitz – lead guitar, backing vocals
- Scott Ian – rhythm guitar, backing vocals
- Frank Bello – bass, backing vocals
- Charlie Benante – drums
