= Anthrology: No Hit Wonders (1985–1991) =

Compilation album by Anthrax
- Released: September 20, 2005
- Recorded: 1985–1991
- Genre: Thrash metal
- Length: 2:34:58 (CDs)
- Label: Universal
- Producer: Anthrax

Anthrax chronology
The Greater of Two Evils (2004)	Anthrology: No Hit Wonders (1985–1991) (2005)	Alive 2 (2005) (2005)

Professional ratings
Review scores
Source	Rating
AllMusic	4/5 stars
Encyclopedia of Popular Music	4/5 stars
Pitchfork	7.7/10

Anthrology: No Hit Wonders (1985–1991) is a greatest hits compilation of songs by the band Anthrax, which is centered on the 2005 Among the Living line-up reunion (see also Alive 2) which includes current vocalist Joey Belladonna and former guitarist Dan Spitz. This release features only songs from the band's Joey Belladonna-era studio output, which began with Armed and Dangerous and ended with Attack of the Killer B's. Therefore, no songs from Fistful of Metal (which features Neil Turbin) Sound of White Noise, Stomp 442, Volume 8: The Threat Is Real or We've Come for You All (which all feature John Bush) are included on this video compilation.

This release was issued in separate CD and DVD versions. The CD version comprises two discs. All of the tracks featured on the CD version of this release have been remastered. The DVD version of this release is referred to as Anthrology: No Hit Wonders (1985–1991): The Videos, and features all of the videos Anthrax released during Joey Belladonna's first tenure with the band. Both the title and the album cover seem to be references to The Beatles Anthology.

== Track listings ==
=== CD ===
Disc 1

1. "A.I.R." – 5:45
2. "Lone Justice" – 4:36
3. "Madhouse" – 4:17
4. "The Enemy" – 5:24
5. "Armed and Dangerous" (Neil Turbin, Scott Ian) – 5:43
6. "Medusa" – 4:44
7. "Gung-Ho" (Neil Turbin, Scott Ian)– 4:37
8. "Among the Living" – 5:15
9. "Caught in a Mosh" – 4:58
10. "I Am the Law" – 5:53
11. "Efilnikufesin (N.F.L.)" – 4:54
12. "A Skeleton in the Closet" – 5:30
13. "Indians" – 5:40
14. "Sabbath Bloody Sabbath" – 5:33 (Black Sabbath cover) After the end of the song the band begins to play "Sweet Leaf", another Black Sabbath song, which fades out.
15. "I'm the Man" – 3:02 (Def Uncensored radio version)
- Tracks 1–7 taken from Spreading the Disease.
- Tracks 8–13 taken from Among the Living.
- Tracks 14 & 15 taken from I'm the Man EP.

Disc 2

1. "Be All, End All" – 6:23
2. "Make Me Laugh" – 5:41
3. "Antisocial" – 4:26 (Trust cover)
4. "Who Cares Wins" – 7:38
5. "Now It's Dark" – 5:36
6. "Finale" – 5:51
7. "Time" – 6:52
8. "Keep It in the Family" – 7:08
9. "In My World" – 6:26
10. "Intro to Reality" – 3:24 (Instrumental)
11. "Belly of the Beast" – 4:47
12. "Got the Time" – 2:44 (Joe Jackson cover)
13. "Discharge" – 4:12
14. "Bring Tha Noise" – 3:31 (Featuring Public Enemy)
15. "Antisocial (French version)" – 4:26
- Tracks 1–6 taken from State of Euphoria.
- Tracks 7–13 taken from Persistence of Time.
- Track 14 taken from Attack of the Killer B's.
- Track 15 taken from Penikufesin EP.

=== DVD ===
1. "Metal Thrashing Mad (Neil Turbin, Scott Ian, Lilker)(Live In Germany)"
2. "Madhouse"
3. "Indians"
4. "Armed and Dangerous (Neil Turbin, Scott Ian)(Live In London)"
5. "Among the Living (Live In London)"
6. "Caught In A Mosh (Live In London)"
7. "I Am the Law"
8. "I'm the Man"
9. "Who Cares Wins"
10. "Belly of the Beast"
11. "Got the Time"
12. "In My World"
13. "Bring the Noise" (Featuring Public Enemy)
- The DVD also contains the following two bonus tracks:
1. "Madhouse" (MTV version)
2. "I'm the Man" (Live)

== Personnel ==
- Joey Belladonna – vocals
- Dan Spitz – guitar
- Scott Ian – guitar, vocals
- Frank Bello – bass
- Charlie Benante – drums
