= DII Band =

American rock band from the 2010s

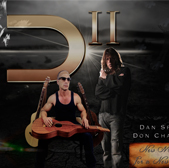

Background information
- Origin: Long Island, NY
- Genres: Blues rock; folk rock
- Years active: 2014–present
- Label: SmashMouth Records
- Members: Dan Spitz; Don Chaffin
- Website: diiband.com

DII Band is an American blues/folk rock band formed in early 2014. The band is a duo made up of members Dan Spitz (Anthrax, Red Lamb) and Don Chaffin (Red Lamb and Voices of Extreme).

== Band members ==
- Dan Spitz - lead guitar (2014–present)
- Don Chaffin - lead vocals (2014–present)

== Dan and Don history ==
Dan Spitz, "a three-time Grammy nominated (for songs co-written & co-produced) multi-Platinum recording artist who's sold upwards of 20 million albums (Anthrax)" and Don Chaffin were formerly in the band Red Lamb together. Not long after, they reunited in a musical collaboration to form the band DII. "Quietly and secretly for many months I endured 6 to 8 hours a day of learning an entirely new instrument and envisioning the sound of what will come in my head." Spitz learned an entirely new instrument called the Weissenborn to create the unique sound for DII.

"The DII Duo takes the Blues base that Heavy Metal was derived from and transforms it into 'A New Music For A New Era.' The Duo will play alongside myriad genres of music, from the hardest of thrash metal's best to the soulful valleys of slide guitar greats, and beyond."
