= I'm the Man (EP) =

EP by Anthrax
- Released: December 8, 1987
- Recorded: 1987
- Genre: Thrash metal; rap metal; comedy rock
- Length: 28:01
- Label: Megaforce; Island
- Producer: Anthrax; Eddie Kramer; Paul Hammingson

Anthrax chronology
Among the Living (1987)	I'm the Man (1987)	State of Euphoria (1988)

Professional ratings
Review scores
Source	Rating
AllMusic	4/5 stars
Christgau's Record Guide	B−
The New Rolling Stone Album Guide	3.5/5 stars

I'm the Man is the second EP by American metal band Anthrax, released in 1987 by Megaforce Worldwide/Island Records (although the song was supposedly written three years before). The band, along with Eddie Kramer and Paul Hammingson, produced the EP, which includes the single "I'm the Man". The single is considered among the first rap metal songs.

The title track is a comedy/novelty song that parodies the style of the Beastie Boys, and its main guitar riff is based on the melody of the Jewish folk song "Hava Nagila" (guitarists Scott Ian and Dan Spitz, as well as all the members of the Beastie Boys, are Jewish); according to Charlie Benante, the song was meant to have the Beastie Boys as the MCs on the song, but scheduling conflicts prevented it, so the band performed the vocals themselves.

For live performances, Joey Belladonna and Benante would switch places, Benante performing some of the raps and Belladonna drumming. A 7" single was also released, containing only the second and fifth tracks.

A new version titled "I'm the Man '91" would appear on the 1991 b-sides collection Attack of the Killer B's.

== Samples and borrowed material ==
The beginning of "I'm the Man" features an electric guitar riff of the Jewish folk song "Hava Nagila", which can also be heard in the chorus. The chorus' lyrics are borrowed from one of Taylor Negron's lines in the Rodney Dangerfield film Easy Money. Rather than using a sample, the song's lines are performed by Frank Bello. Anthrax also used one of Sam Kinison's famous primal screams for the song. At about 1:55, a sample of the Metallica song "Master of Puppets" from the 1986 album Master of Puppets can be heard. A few times after "I'm The Man" is said, a sample of "shut up" from Run-DMC's "You Talk Too Much" from the 1985 album King of Rock can be heard. Additionally, the "yeah" that begins the song "(You Gotta) Fight for Your Right (To Party!)" by the Beastie Boys on their 1986 debut, Licensed to Ill, is sampled.

== Track listing ==
No.	Title	Writer(s)	Length
1.	"I'm the Man" (Censored Radio version)	Joey Belladonna, Dan Spitz, Scott Ian, Frank Bello, Charlie Benante, John Rooney	3:03
2.	"I'm the Man" (Def Uncensored version)	Belladonna, Spitz, Ian, Bello, Benante, Rooney	3:04
3.	"Sabbath Bloody Sabbath" (Black Sabbath cover)	Ozzy Osbourne, Tony Iommi, Geezer Butler, Bill Ward	5:48
4.	"I'm the Man" (Live)	Belladonna, Spitz, Ian, Bello, Benante, Rooney	4:39
5.	"Caught in a Mosh" (Live)	Anthrax	5:34
6.	"I Am the Law" (Live)	Anthrax, Danny Lilker	5:48
Total length:			27:56

== Personnel ==
- Joey Belladonna – lead vocals, drums
- Dan Spitz – lead guitar
- Scott Ian – rhythm guitar, backing vocals
- Frank Bello – bass, backing vocals
- Charlie Benante – drums, lead vocals

=== Additional personnel ===
- Mark Weiss – photographer, album photography

== Charts ==
EP

Chart (1987)	Peak position
Finnish Albums (The Official Finnish Charts)	4
Swedish Albums (Sverigetopplistan)	42
US Billboard 200	53

Song

Chart (1987)	Peak position
New Zealand (RMNZ)	21
UK (OCC)	20

== Certifications ==
Region	Certification	Certified units/sales
Canada (Music Canada)	Gold	50,000^{^}
United States (RIAA)	Platinum	1,000,000^{^}
^{^} Shipments figures based on certification alone.
