= Among the Living =

1987 studio album by Anthrax

Studio album by Anthrax
- Released: March 22, 1987
- Recorded: October–December 1986
- Studios: Quadradial, Miami, Florida; Compass Point, Nassau, Bahamas
- Genre: Thrash metal
- Length: 50:23
- Labels: Megaforce; Island
- Producers: Anthrax; Eddie Kramer

Anthrax chronology
Spreading the Disease (1985)	Among the Living (1987)	I'm the Man (1987)

Anthrax studio chronology
Spreading the Disease (1985)	Among the Living (1987)	State of Euphoria (1988)

Singles from Among the Living
- 1. "I Am the Law" Released: February 1987; 2. "Indians" Released: June 15, 1987

Among the Living is the third studio album by American heavy metal band Anthrax. It was released on March 22, 1987, by Megaforce Records in the US and by Island Records in the rest of the world. The album is dedicated to Cliff Burton of Metallica, who died in a bus accident six months before its release while Metallica were on tour with Anthrax as the opening act.

Veteran engineer Eddie Kramer, at his first venture with a thrash metal act, co-produced the album. Recording proceeded smoothly, but different visions for the sound of the final release created disagreements between Anthrax and the producer during the audio mixing.

Anthrax members described the album as their breakthrough, as it marked the progression from the band playing in small clubs to arenas and stadiums. The album was critically acclaimed and promoted the band among the "Big Four" of thrash metal. The band's second gold record, Among the Living was certified gold by the RIAA on July 31, 1990.

== Background ==
The original members of Anthrax grew up in New York City listening to 1970s rock and hard rock and turned to heavy metal in the 1980s, profoundly influenced by bands like Iron Maiden, Judas Priest and Motörhead. Drummer Charlie Benante was also a fan of bands playing music considered extreme at the time, such as Raven and Venom, and he and guitarist Scott Ian enjoyed hardcore as much as metal. Guitarist Dan Spitz, originally in the band Overkill, was an accomplished, trained musician, while Joey Belladonna had a background as a singer in cover bands of arena rock acts Bad Company, Foreigner and Journey. The integration of these differing musical sensibilities resulted in Anthrax's second album, Spreading the Disease, praised by critics for showing decisive progress from the band's debut release, Fistful of Metal, and for introducing a unique sound, which opposed the fast and heavy riffing of thrash metal with Belladonna's clean and melodic vocals. That album also marked the beginning of the songwriting method that would see the band through its most successful period. Benante would create riffs and rough musical structures for all the songs, that would later be developed, integrated and arranged with the other musicians. Ian composed all the lyrics and worked on them with Belladonna to create vocal melodies that were fit to his high-pitched, melodic singing style.

Anthrax had spent about six months in 1985 recording Spreading the Disease, their first album for the major label Island Records, which sold more than 100,000 copies worldwide. They had been on tour to support the album since its release, both as headliners in small clubs and as an opening act for other bands. When opening for W.A.S.P. and Black Sabbath on their tour supporting the album Seventh Star, Anthrax played for the first time in mid-sized arenas and were thrilled by the experience and by audiences' reaction to their music.

After a brief stop to rehearse new songs in July 1986, Anthrax joined longtime friends and Megaforce Records labelmates Metallica on the European leg of Metallica's Damage, Inc. Tour supporting Master of Puppets. In Sweden on September 27, Metallica bassist Cliff Burton was killed when the band's tour bus skidded off the road. His death profoundly impacted the thrash-metal community in which he was a highly regarded figure, and the members of Anthrax dedicated their new album Among the Living to his memory. In 2012, Ian said in an interview that part of the reason "... the album sounds so angry is because Cliff died. We'd lost our friend, and it was so wrong and unfair."

== Musical style ==
"Caught in a Mosh"
The songs of Among the Living are characterized by aggressive fast riffing and gang choruses.

The music press largely considers Among the Living one of the strongest thrash metal albums ever recorded. In comparison with Spreading the Disease, the songs on the album generally feature faster rhythms granted by Benante's double-pedal bass-drum beats, stronger hardcore influences in the frequent gang choruses and a more aggressive vocal delivery by Belladonna. According to Ian, the general sonic approach of the songs is similar to "A.I.R.", the opening track of Spreading the Disease. The structure of the tracks is conventional and sometimes inspired by other rock songs, such as AC/DC's "Whole Lotta Rosie" for "Caught in a Mosh", but with many rhythm changes and melodies that sometimes yield to the aggressive and dry sound. One critic considered this last feature a probable carryover from the Stormtroopers of Death project, a seminal crossover band formed in 1985 by Benante, Ian and original Anthrax bassist Danny Lilker, that had combined metal riffs with hardcore on an album of short, fast and satirical songs titled Speak English or Die.

== Composition ==
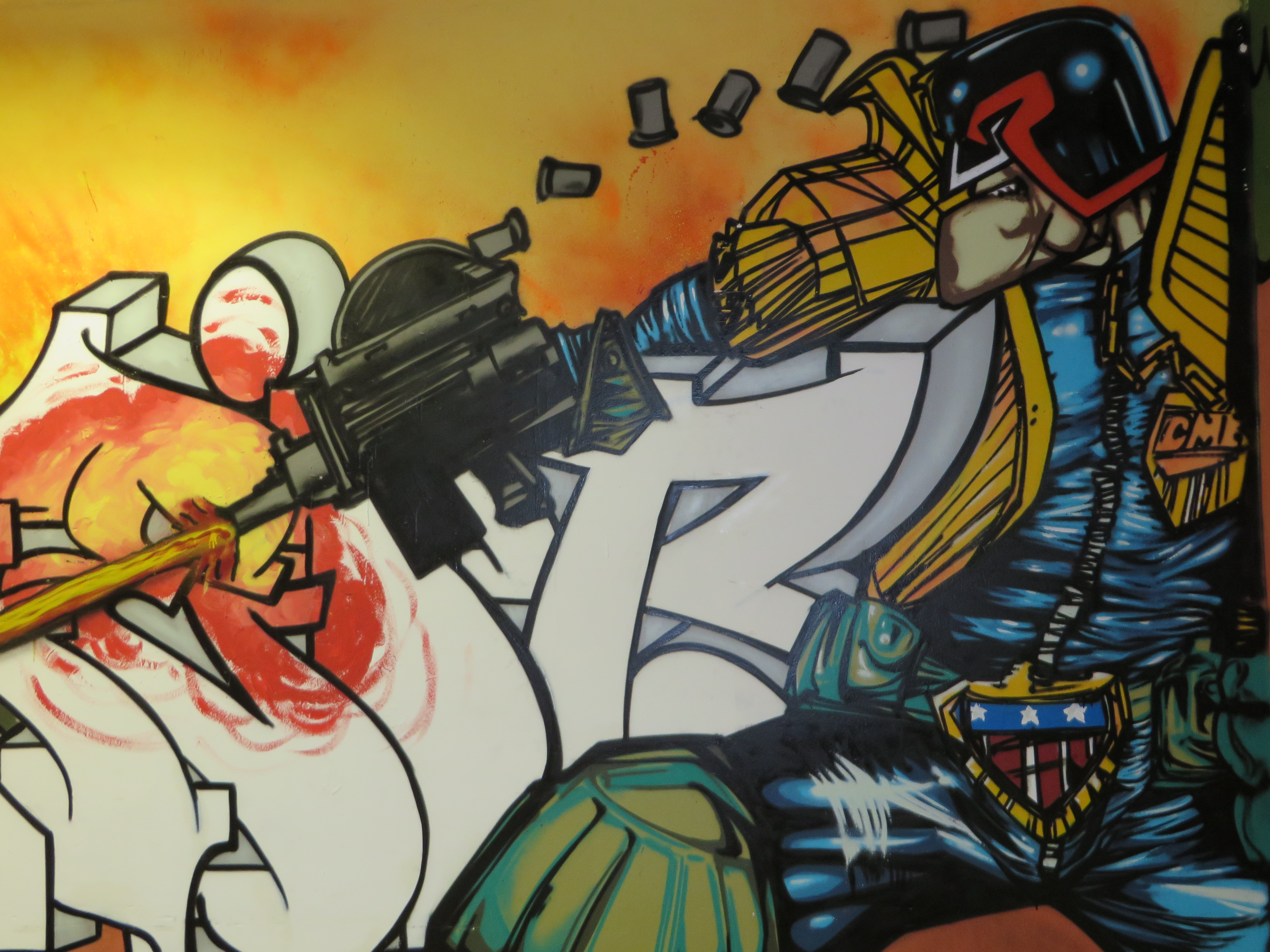
"I Am the Law" is a tribute to comic book hero Judge Dredd. The song's lyrics reference numerous characters, settings, and story elements from Dredd's fictional universe.

Anthrax composed the songs "I Am the Law", "Indians", and "I'm the Man" during the tour of 1986, rehearsed the first two, and included "I Am the Law" in their live setlist. Most of the songs were written in July 1986, after the tour had ended. At the end of July 1986, Anthrax arranged and rehearsed the new songs at Top Cat rehearsal studios in New York City, before leaving for the UK, where they joined Metallica for their European dates.

Music critics praised the use of humor in Among the Living's lyrics, which were inspired by disparate sources. Socially conscious matters are present in songs such as "Indians", about the plight of Native Americans forced to live on reservations, "One World", which deals with the risk of nuclear holocaust and "Imitation of Life", about false personas, especially in the music business. (Note: "Imitation of Life" is co-credited to Lilker, because it is a reworked version of the S.O.D. song "Aren't You Hungry?" written in 1985. The original version of "Aren't You Hungry?" was recorded by M.O.D. on their 1987 album U.S.A. for M.O.D., and by S.O.D. themselves on the 1999 album Bigger than the Devil.) "Efilnikufesin (N.F.L.)" ("nise fukin life" spelled backwards) is a protest song against drug abuse and was inspired by comedian John Belushi's drug addiction and death. Ian is still baffled that journalists ask him why he wrote a song about the National Football League, just showing that "they haven't bothered to read the lyrics, or understand the whole point of the song."

Two of the album's songs are based on characters and situations taken from Stephen King's work: "Among the Living" draws from the novel The Stand, and "A Skeleton in the Closet" from the novella "Apt Pupil", a part of the Different Seasons collection. Both Ian and Benante were avid readers of King's works. "I Am the Law" is based on riffs left over from the recording sessions of Spreading the Disease and is co-credited with Lilker. The title is the catchphrase of Judge Dredd, a comic book character whose stories were originally published in the British magazine 2000 AD, of which Ian was a reader and fan.

"Caught in a Mosh" recounts a roadie's experience during an agitated concert; many metalheads consider it a classic thrash-metal anthem. Critics read it as a glorification of the slam pit and a metaphor for life struggles. The last song written for the album was "Horror of It All" as a tribute to Cliff Burton, whose death affected the band members.

== Recording ==
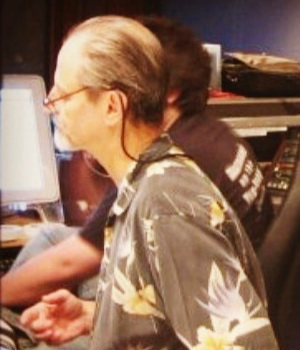
Producer and engineer Eddie Kramer explained how he accepted the work with Anthrax: "Their manager, Johnny Z, said to me, ‘I’ve got this band, Anthrax. They like the sounds you get – would you like to work with them?’ That's what started it. We went to Florida and took over a small studio for about a month."

The band wanted a producer who could capture the energy of their live show and requested Eddie Kramer for the task. Kramer was a famous producer and engineer who had worked with Jimi Hendrix, Led Zeppelin and Kiss, among others. The live sound that Kramer had captured in the Kiss album Alive! (1975) had especially impressed Ian and Benante when they were young. "When Eddie said yes to us, it was a total headfuck," guitarist Scott Ian recalled.

The band recorded the new songs in about six weeks at Quadradial Studios in Miami, Florida. It was difficult at the time to record the sound of overdriven guitars, typical of thrash metal bands such as Anthrax, and manage to distinguish it from the bass guitar and the bass drum. As Kramer recalled: "I'd never recorded anything quite like it. I wasn't sure of what they were looking for initially. And it was a challenge to figure out ways to record heavy guitars with heavy drums – it was just a different process." Kramer set up the recording sessions as group live performances, and the band members were enthusiastic regarding the atmosphere and the sound produced. "We always felt like when we were in a room rehearsing, we were at our best," Ian said. "We were killing it, and we had all the confidence in the world." The production then moved for retouching and mixing of the tracks to Compass Point Studios in Nassau, Bahamas, a facility owned by Chris Blackwell, the president of Anthrax's record label Island Records. Ian had suggested that recording studio only because Iron Maiden had been working there since 1983.

In Nassau, Kramer created a first mix full of sound effects and reverb and claimed to have done a "modern mixing", similar to producer Robert John "Mutt" Lange's work for Def Leppard's best-selling album Pyromania. The band members were dissatisfied with the mix and rejected it, arguing with Kramer to return to a clean, dry sound as close to the original live recording as possible. In a 2013 interview, Kramer remarked how "... the guys had a totally different attitude, a totally different way of thinking, and I remember it being contentious during the mixing." Pressed by the possibility of being fired, Kramer relented to the band members' request and wrapped up the mixing process in less than two weeks.

== Artwork ==
The cover art is by illustrator and painter Don Brautigam, a cover artist since the early 1970s, who worked on both Among the Living and Metallica's iconic Master of Puppets. The painting of Among the Living has been the subject of discussion, because it was long believed to depict the character Rev. Henry Kane, the antagonist from the film Poltergeist II: The Other Side, while others thought it depicted Randall Flagg, the subject of the album's title track and the antagonist from the Stephen King novel The Stand. Drummer Charlie Benante, who conceived the concept for the cover, explained: "It was just about how much evil there is amongst us. I wanted to show just the same type of person on the cover. The same type of people and then, the one person that was sticking out, kind of giving you a wave, like a 'hi!'". In 1988, Brautigam was the cover artist for the following Anthrax album State of Euphoria.

== Release ==
Among the Living was mastered by George Marino at Sterling Sound in New York City, and was released worldwide on March 22, 1987, through Jon Zazula's label Megaforce Records and Island Records.

The album was preceded by the release of the single "I Am the Law" in February 1987, in 7-inch and 12-inch formats, which charted in the UK. Both versions had the non-album track "Bud E. Luvbomb and Satan's Lounge Band" as B-side, and the 12-inch also featured "I'm the Man," a song recorded in the same sessions as the rest of the album's tracks. It is among the first songs to have mixed rap and metal. The band's management thought that the song could not fit the sound and drive of Among the Living and decided to release it as a B-side. It was later re-released as a successful EP and became one of the most recognizable Anthrax songs.

The second single "Indians" was released in June 1987. The 12-inch vinyl featured covers of Black Sabbath's "Sabbath Bloody Sabbath" and of S.O.D.'s "Taint", both expressly recorded for the release. A music video directed by Jean Pellerin and Doug Freel was shot for "Indians" and received moderate rotation on MTV in the late-1980s thrash-metal heyday.

Among the Living charted in Europe and reached No. 62 on the US Billboard 200 chart, despite no radio airplay. It sold steadily through the years, and on July 31, 1990, the album was certified Gold, the second Anthrax album to do so after State of Euphoria in 1989.

On November 10, 2009, a deluxe edition of the album was released that included a bonus concert DVD. The release features alternate takes of several album tracks, live versions and the B-side songs "I Am the Law" and "Bud E Luv Bomb and Satan's Lounge Band."

=== In other media ===
The re-recorded version of "Among the Living" from the album The Greater of Two Evils can be heard in the teaser for the 2006 film Clerks II. A cover version of "Caught in a Mosh" is included in the 2007 videogame Guitar Hero Encore: Rocks the 80s, while the master recording is included in 2009's Guitar Hero: Smash Hits and in 2010's Rock Band 3. The same game included "Among the Living" and "Indians" as downloadable content. "Indians" is also included in the 2010 videogame Guitar Hero: Warriors of Rock.

To celebrate the band's 40th anniversary, Anthrax and Z2 Comics released a graphic novel with stories inspired by the songs from Among the Living in July 2021. The collection features contributions from an all-star group of writers and artists from the worlds of music and comics, including Corey Taylor, Grant Morrison, Brian Posehn, Gerard and Mikey Way, Rob Zombie, Brian Azzarello, Jimmy Palmiotti and Rick Remender.

== Tour ==
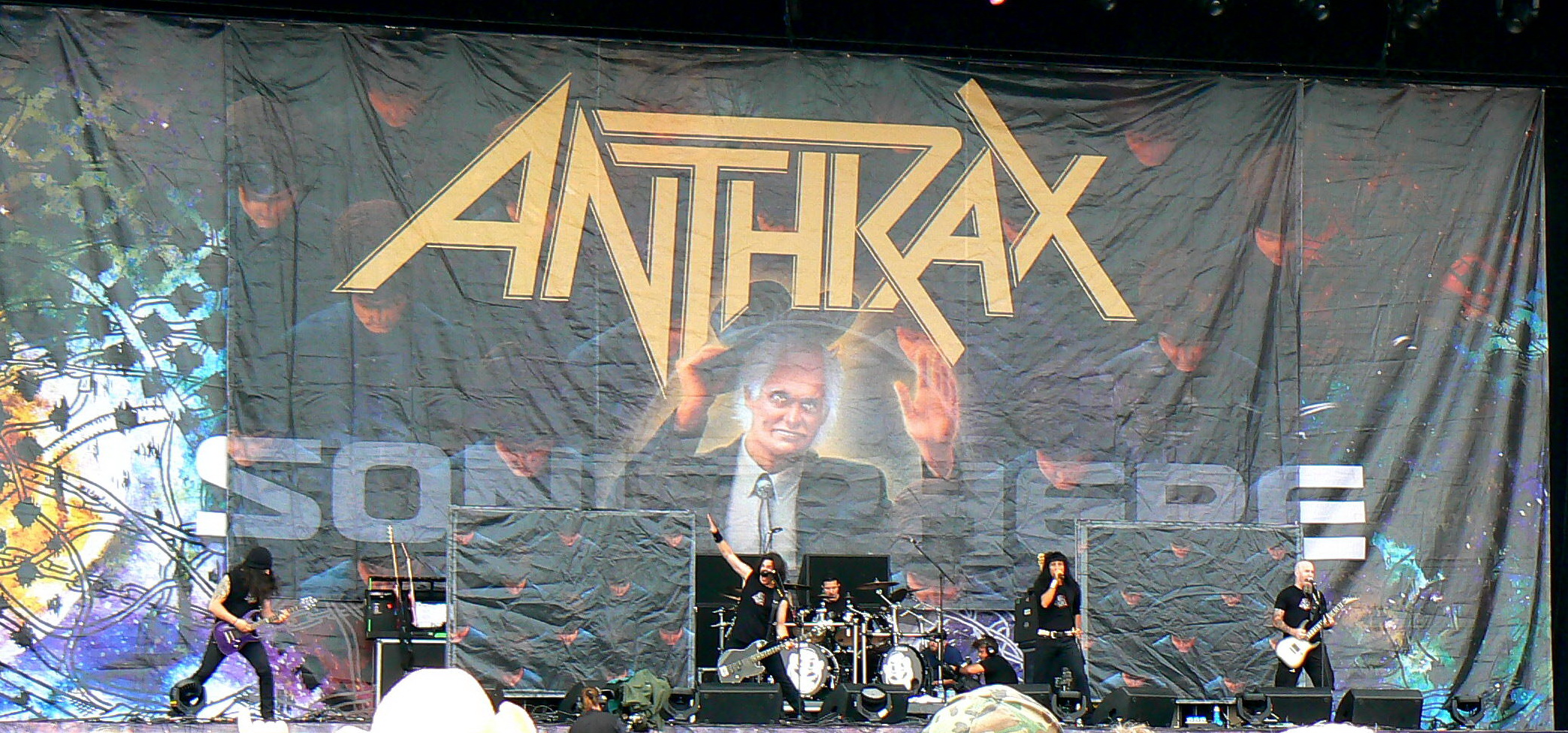
Anthrax at Sonisphere Festival 2010, using the artwork of Among the Living as backdrop.

Soon after the release of the album, Anthrax embarked on a short tour in Japan, but they officially started the Among the Living Tour on May 26, 1987, at the Penny Arcade of Rochester, with Metal Church opening. They played in mid-sized venues as headliners during the summer and then moved to Europe. They were on the bill of the Monsters of Rock festival at Castle Donington, England on August 22, 1987, alongside Bon Jovi, Dio, Metallica, W.A.S.P. and Cinderella. Anthrax played for an audience of 80,000 that day, and in the European tour that followed in September and October sold out 7,000-seaters venues. Back in the US in November, Anthrax went on a tour as headliners in 5000-plus-seaters venues, with Celtic Frost as opening act. At the beginning of 1988, Kiss requested Anthrax as support band for their Crazy Nights World Tour in the US. The tour concluded in the first days of April, when Anthrax returned to the studio to record the album State of Euphoria.

The songs of Among the Living have always been present in the band's live set lists since 1987, with at least four of them as fixed staples of their shows. In 2005, Anthrax reunited their Among the Living lineup, bringing Belladonna and Spitz back into the fold. During the world tour that followed, they played live numerous cuts from the album and performed the record front-to-back at some shows. The band played Among the Living in its entirety again during the Metal Alliance 2013 tour and in 2017.

== Critical reception ==
Professional ratings
Review scores
Source	Rating
AllMusic	4.5/5 stars
Classic Rock	8/10
The Collector's Guide to Heavy Metal	8/10
The Encyclopedia of Popular Music	3/5 stars
Kerrang!	5/5 stars
Metal Storm	10/10
(The New) Rolling Stone Album Guide	3/5 stars
Rock Hard	9.5/10
Sputnikmusic	4.5/5

Among the Living was acclaimed by contemporary and modern music critics and is often cited to this day as a favourite among Anthrax fans. It is generally considered the breakthrough album for Anthrax, their best and most influential, which for its merits propelled the band among the icons of thrash metal. The band's musicianship and the lyrics dedicated to social issues and pop-culture tributes were universally praised.

On Classic Rock magazine, Malcolm Dome appreciated the consistent quality of the album and wrote that Anthrax's "musicianship is on par with anything Metallica were doing at the time." J. D. Considine of Rolling Stone wrote that "Benante and his bandmates may have been regular guys in other respects, but as musicians there was no denying the technical agility that went into each aural onslaught". He also remarked how Anthrax strived to be equal to their fans in the mosh pits and "democratized (their) brilliance by attaching it to some of the band's catchiest, most approachable material." According to Greg Moffitt of BBC Music, Among the Living stroke "a deft balance between marauding speed and judicious use of melody, a juggling feat they'd fumble on later albums." Canadian journalist Martin Popoff had the same opinion about the music, but observed how the introduction for the first time of "a punk ethic" in songs like "Caught in a Mosh", "Efilnikufesin" and "One World" started to undermine "the seriousness of the band, something that was soon to cause image problems." In fact, the album was a critical success, but Anthrax were criticized by both journalists and fans for the inconsistency of their musical evolution and, most of all, for their stage look, which was made up of short pants and t-shirts with commercial images or hardcore logos, in striking contrast with the denim and leather apparel of other thrash metal groups. The band members' apparent endorsement of the skateboarding world was another reason for controversy in contemporary music magazines and among fans.

Anthrax members acknowledge the importance of the album for the band and for the thrash metal scene. Ian declared that Among the Living "wasn't just an important moment in our career. It gave us a career!"

=== Accolades ===
In several articles for the British magazine Kerrang! in 1988, journalist Don Kaye elected Anthrax in the so-called "Big Four of Thrash Metal" elite, alongside Metallica, Megadeth and Slayer. The title was accepted by the metal community and remained attached to Anthrax for the rest of their career.

Martin Popoff placed Among the Living at No. 49 in his The Top 500 Heavy Metal Albums of All Time book in 2004. In July 2005, Among the Living was inducted into the Decibel Hall of Fame, the sixth album overall to be featured. The album was also included in the book 1001 Albums You Must Hear Before You Die (2006). In August 2014, Revolver placed the album on its "14 Thrash Albums You Need to Own" list. In 2017, Rolling Stone ranked Among the Living as 20th on their list of 'The 100 Greatest Metal Albums of All Time.' On October 26, 2020, Kerrang! placed Among the Living at No. 6 in the list of "The 25 greatest thrash metal albums ever". Regarding singular songs, "Caught in a Mosh" is ranked No. 29 in VH1's "40 Greatest Metal Songs."

== Track listings ==
All tracks are written by Anthrax (Scott Ian, Charlie Benante, Joey Belladonna, Frank Bello, and Dan Spitz, except where noted.

Side one
No.	Title	Lyrics	Music	Length
1.	"Among the Living"	Anthrax, Stephen King		5:16
2.	"Caught in a Mosh"			4:59
3.	"I Am the Law"		Anthrax, Dan Lilker	5:57
4.	"Efilnikufesin (N.F.L.)"			4:54
5.	"A Skeleton in the Closet"	Anthrax, King		5:32

Side two
No.	Title	Music	Length
6.	"Indians"		5:40
7.	"One World"		5:56
8.	"A.D.I./Horror of It All"		7:49
9.	"Imitation of Life"	Anthrax, Liker	4:10

2009 deluxe edition bonus tracks
No.	Title	Writer(s)	Length
10.	"Indians" (alternate lead)		5:39
11.	"One World" (alternate take)		5:55
12.	"Imitation of Life" (alternate take)		4:26
13.	"Bud E Luv Bomb and Satan's Lounge Band"	Anthrax	2:45
14.	"I Am the Law" (live in Dallas)		6:03
15.	"I'm the Man" (instrumental)	Anthrax, John Rooney	3:04
Total length:			78:18

2009 deluxe edition disc two: "Oidivnikufesin (N.F.V.)" DVD. Recorded live in London, England, November 16, 1987.
No.	Title	Length
1.	"Intro"	0:11
2.	"Among the Living"	5:04
3.	"Caught in a Mosh"	5:15
4.	"Metal Thrashing Mad"	2:54
5.	"I Am the Law"	5:48
6.	"Madhouse"	4:06
7.	"Indians"	5:37
8.	"Medusa"	4:18
9.	"Efilnikufesin (N.F.L.)"	4:54
10.	"Armed and Dangerous"	4:31
11.	"A.I.R./I'm the Man/A.I.R."	11:57
12.	"Gung Ho"	9:02
Total length:		63:37

Notes

- The lyrics to "Among the Living" are inspired by the Stephen King novel The Stand.
- The lyrics to "I Am the Law" are inspired by the character of Judge Dredd
- The lyrics to "A Skeleton in the Closet" are inspired by the Stephen King novella Apt Pupil featured in the collection Different Seasons.

== Personnel ==
All credits adapted from the original releases.

Anthrax

- Joey Belladonna – lead vocals
- Dan Spitz – lead guitar, backing vocals, acoustic guitar on "A.D.I."
- Scott Ian – rhythm guitar, backing vocals
- Frank Bello – bass, backing vocals
- Charlie Benante – drums

Production

- Eddie Kramer – production, engineering, mixing
- Chris Rutherford – engineering
- Francis McSweeney – assistant engineering
- Chip Schane – assistant engineering
- Paul Hamingson – mixing
- George Marino – mastering at Sterling Sound, New York
- Jon Zazula – executive production

== Charts ==
Chart (1987)	Peak position
Dutch Albums (Album Top 100)	46
Finnish Albums (The Official Finnish Charts)	8
German Albums (Offizielle Top 100)	46
Swedish Albums (Sverigetopplistan)	43
UK Albums (Official Charts)	18
US Billboard 200	62

Chart (2010)	Peak position
UK Rock & Metal Albums (Official Charts)	10

Chart (2026)	Peak position
Greek Albums (IFPI)	66

== Certifications ==
Region	Certification	Certified units/sales
United Kingdom (BPI)	Silver	60,000^{^}
United States (RIAA)	Gold	500,000^{^}
^{^} Shipments figures based on certification alone.

== Sources ==
=== Bibliography ===
- Arnopp, Jason (December 12, 1992). "Disease Delight". Kerrang!. No. 422. p. 21.
- Benante, Charlie (July 2016). "How Kiss changed my life". Classic Rock. No. 224. Archived from the original on January 23, 2021.
- Christe, Ian (2004). Sound of the Beast: The Complete Headbanging History of Heavy Metal. New York City: !t Books/HarperCollins. ISBN 978-0-380-81127-4.
- Considine, J. D. (2004). Brackett, Nathan; Hoard, Christian David (eds.). The New Rolling Stone Album Guide. Simon & Schuster. p. 20. ISBN 0-7432-0169-8.
- Dome, Malcolm (March 2006). "Anthrax: How We Made Among The Living". Metal Hammer. No. 150. Archived from the original on June 2, 2019.
- Dome, Malcolm (March 2010). "Anthrax – Reissues". Classic Rock. No. 142. p. 92.
- Ian, Scott; Wiederhorn, Jon (November 24, 2015). I'm the Man – The Story of That Guy from Anthrax. Da Capo Press. ISBN 978-0-306-82419-7.
- Jarman, Colin M.; Acton, Peter (1995). Judge Dredd: The Mega-history. Oxford, UK: Lennard. ISBN 978-1-852-91128-7.
- Johnson, Howard (November 1, 1985). "Germ Warfare". Kerrang!. No. 106. London, UK: Morgan Grampian. p. 21.
- Kaye, Don (June 11, 1988). "'Thrax Facts". Kerrang!. No. 191. pp. 7–9.
- Konow, David (January 2, 2003). Bang Your Head: The Rise and Fall of Heavy Metal. New York City: Three Rivers Press. ISBN 978-0-609-80732-3.
- Larkin, Colin (2011). Encyclopedia of Popular Music (5th ed.). Omnibus Press. p. 176. ISBN 978-0-857-12595-8.
- Lawson, Dom (January 30, 2017). "Among The Living: Anthrax look back at their classic album 30 years on". Metal Hammer. No. 291. Archived from the original on May 2, 2021.
- Ling, Dave (March 2017). "Live! Anthrax". Classic Rock. No. 233. p. 104.
- McIver, Joel (January 9, 2006). Justice for All: The Truth About Metallica (2 ed.). London, UK: Omnibus Press. ISBN 978-1-84449-828-4.
- McIver, Joel (February 7, 2006). Dimery, Robert; Lydon, Michael (eds.). 1001 Albums You Must Hear Before You Die: Revised and Updated Edition. Universe Publishing. ISBN 978-0-789-31371-3.
- McIver, Joel (2009). To Live is to Die: The Life and Death of Metallica's Cliff Burton (2 ed.). London, UK: Jawbone Press. ISBN 978-1-90600-224-4.
- Miller, Paul (January 7, 1989). "Anthrax - Spreading the Disease". Kerrang!. No. 220. p. 28 (10).
- Pennanen, Timo (2006). Sisältää hitin – levyt ja esittäjät Suomen musiikkilistoilla vuodesta 1972 (in Finnish) (1st ed.). Helsinki: Kustannusosakeyhtiö Otava. ISBN 978-951-1-21053-5.
- Philips, William; Cogan, Brian (2009). Encyclopedia of heavy metal music. Westport, CT: Greenwood Press. p. 26. ISBN 978-0-313-34800-6.
- Popoff, Martin (2004). The Top 500 Heavy Metal Albums of All Time. Toronto, Canada: ECW Press. ISBN 978-1-554-90245-3. Archived from the original on July 8, 2021.
- Popoff, Martin (November 1, 2005). The Collector's Guide to Heavy Metal: Volume 2: The Eighties. Burlington, Ontario, Canada: Collector's Guide Publishing. p. 23. ISBN 978-1-894-95931-5.
- Trojan, Frank (1985). "Review Album: Anthrax - Spreading the Disease". Rock Hard (in German). No. 15. Archived from the original on May 15, 2021.
- Trojan, Frank (1987). "Review Album: Anthrax - Among the Living". Rock Hard (in German). No. 21. Archived from the original on November 30, 2020.
- Waksman, Steve (2009). This Ain't the Summer of Love: Conflict and Crossover in Heavy Metal and Punk. Berkeley, California: University of California Press. ISBN 978-0-520-94388-9.

=== Multimedia ===
- Anthrax (1987). Among the Living (LP Sleeve). Island Records. 90584-1.
- Anthrax (2009). Among the Living (CD Sleeve). Island Records. B0013348-00.
- Anthrology: No Hit Wonders (1985–1991): The Videos (DVD liner notes). Island Records. 2005. B0004997-09.
- Anthrax (1987). I Am the Law (12"cover). Island Records. 12IS 316.
- Anthrax (1986). Indians (12"cover). Island Records. 12IS 325.

=== Websites ===
- Accardo, Sal (June 28, 2007). "Guitar Hero Encore: Rocks the 80s Final Set List Announced". GameSpy. Archived from the original on April 22, 2021.
- "Don Brautigam credits". AllMusic. Archived from the original on July 8, 2021.
- "Eddie Kramer credits". AllMusic. Archived from the original on May 16, 2021.
- "Among the Living 1987". Anthrax Official Website. Archived from the original on June 10, 2015.
- Atari (October 8, 2012). "Anthrax: Among the Living staff review". Sputnikmusic.
- Bennett, J. (July 1, 2005). "Anthrax – "Among the Living"". Decibel. Archived from the original on September 21, 2020.
- "Chart History: Anthrax". Billboard. Archived from the original on August 9, 2020.
- "It's Official: Anthrax's 'Among The Living' Lineup To Reunite". Blabbermouth.net. March 24, 2005. Archived from the original on February 25, 2021.
- "Anthrax: 'Among The Living' Featured In 'Clerks II' Trailer". Blabbermouth.net. January 10, 2006. Archived from the original on November 7, 2015.
- Blistein, Jon (November 19, 2020). "Anthrax to Celebrate 40th Anniversary With 'Among the Living' Graphic Novel". Rolling Stone. Archived from the original on December 31, 2020.
- Bosso, Joe (December 12, 2013). "Production legend Eddie Kramer on 11 career-defining records". MusicRadar. Archived from the original on June 22, 2020.
- "Anthrax – Among The Living Deluxe Edition Detailed". Bravewords.com. Brave Words & Bloody Knuckles. September 15, 2009. Archived from the original on March 3, 2016.
- Chantler, Chris (July 11, 2016). "Anthrax: the story behind every album cover". Metal Hammer. Archived from the original on May 22, 2021.
- Considine, J. D. (June 21, 2017). "The 100 Greatest Metal Albums of All Time: Anthrax, 'Among the Living' (1987)". Rolling Stone. Archived from the original on July 29, 2020.
- DaRonco, Mike. "Anthrax – I'm the Man review". AllMusic. Archived from the original on May 2, 2021.
- Erlewine, Stephen Thomas. "Anthrax Biography". AllMusic. Archived from the original on May 23, 2015.
- Fahey, Mike (June 4, 2010). "The Curtain Rises On Guitar Hero: Warriors Of Rock". Kotaku.com. Kotaku. Archived from the original on July 8, 2021.
- "Album – Anthrax, Among the Living". Charts.de (in German). GfK Entertainment Charts. Archived from the original on June 21, 2020.
- Grow, Kory (December 1, 2011). "Metallica, Slayer, Megadeth and Anthrax: The Oral History of the Big 4". Revolver. Archived from the original on October 18, 2019.
- Grow, Kory (January 1, 2012). "Anthrax's 'Among the Living': The Story Behind Thrash OG's Mosh Masterpiece". Revolver. Archived from the original on July 26, 2020.
- Grow, Kory (October 19, 2015). "Anthrax Talk 'Spreading the Disease' Reissue, 'Fascist Guitar Playing'". Rolling Stone. Archived from the original on September 29, 2020.
- Hadusek, Jon (June 8, 2021). "Anthrax Share Details and Release Date for Among the Living Graphic Novel". Consequence. Archived from the original on June 8, 2021.
- Huey, Steve. "Anthrax: Among the Living". AllMusic. Archived from the original on November 4, 2013.
- Huff, Thomas; Carrigan, Joe (November 26, 1988). "An Interview with Anthrax Joey Belladonna". University of Maryland, Baltimore County. Archived from the original on July 8, 2021.
- Jupitreas (April 18, 2004). "Anthrax – Among the Living staff review". Metal Storm. Archived from the original on July 7, 2017.
- "Dan Spitz Calls Out Former Anthrax Bandmates as 'Fairytale Tellers'". Loudwire. November 3, 2015. Archived from the original on September 18, 2020.
- Martos Garcia, Ramon (August 9, 2012). "...And Justice For Art: Anthrax's "Among The Living" – An Intriguing Painting for a Thrash Metal Masterpiece". Puregrainaudio.com. Archived from the original on January 15, 2021.
- Massie, Andrew (February 9, 2016). "Interview: Joey Belladonna – Anthrax". The Rockpit.net. Archived from the original on May 16, 2021.
- Massie, Andrew (November 21, 2016). "Interview: Danny Lilker – Nuclear Assault". The Rockpit.net. Archived from the original on May 15, 2021.
- "Anthrax – Among the Living". Dutchcharts.nl (in Dutch). Media Control Charts. Archived from the original on June 23, 2019.
- "Anthrax – Among the Living (Album)". Swedishcharts.com. Media Control Charts. Archived from the original on September 17, 2020.
- Moffitt, Greg (February 8, 2010). "Anthrax: Among the Living". BBC Music. Archived from the original on February 11, 2011.
- "Anthrax Official Charts". Official Charts Company. Archived from the original on August 12, 2020.
- Ouellette, Mary (December 26, 2012). "Dates Revealed for 2013 Metal Alliance Tour Featuring Anthrax, Exodus + Municipal Waste". Loudwire. Archived from the original on January 21, 2021.
- Prato, Greg (February 26, 2013). "Songfacts interview with Charlie Benante by Greg Prato". Songfacts. Archived from the original on May 12, 2019.
- Prato, Greg (May 9, 2017). "Charlie Benante (Anthrax)". Songfacts. Archived from the original on May 16, 2021.
- "RIAA – Gold & Platinum: Anthrax". Recording Industry Association of America. Archived from the original on June 21, 2020.
- "14 Thrash Albums You Need to Own". Revolver.com. August 29, 2014. Archived from the original on September 25, 2014.
- "RBDB: Songs – Search for Anthrax". Rock Band Database. Harmonix. Archived from the original on August 19, 2020.
- Ruskell, Nick (October 26, 2020). "The 25 greatest thrash metal albums ever". Kerrang!. Archived from the original on February 22, 2021.
- Smith, Matt T.A. (2016). "(((O))) : Interview: Frank Bello from Anthrax". Echoes and Dust.com. Archived from the original on May 15, 2021.
- Syrjala, Marko (May 4, 2006). "Dan Spitz of Anthrax". Metal Rules. Archived from the original on May 15, 2021.
- Syrjala, Marko (February 22, 2007). "Neil Turbin (Deathriders, Ex-Anthrax) – Sets The Record Straight !". Metal Rules. Archived from the original on May 15, 2021.
- "40 greatest metal songs (1–40)". VH1. MTV Networks. Archived from the original on July 6, 2008.
- Weaver, James (February 17, 2017). "Interview: Charlie Benante – Anthrax". Distorted Sound. Archived from the original on May 16, 2021.
- Wiederhorn, Jon (October 30, 2019). "34 Years Ago: Anthrax Start 'Spreading the Disease'". Loudwire. Archived from the original on November 1, 2020.
- Wiederhorn, Jon (March 22, 2020). "33 Years Ago: Anthrax Make Thrash History With 'Among the Living'". Loudwire. Archived from the original on November 19, 2020.
