= Spreading the Disease =

Studio album by Anthrax
- Released: October 28, 1985
- Recorded: 1985
- Studio: Pyramid (Ithaca, New York)
- Genres: Thrash metal; speed metal
- Length: 43:40
- Label: Island
- Producers: Carl Canedy; Anthrax

Anthrax chronology
Armed and Dangerous (1985)	Spreading the Disease (1985)	Among the Living (1987)

Singles from Spreading the Disease
- 1. "Madhouse" Released: October 7, 1985

Spreading the Disease is the second studio album by the American thrash metal band Anthrax, released on October 28, 1985, through Island.

It was the band's first album to feature vocalist Joey Belladonna and bassist Frank Bello.

A special two-disc edition of the album was released on October 19, 2015, celebrating 30th anniversary.

== Background and writing ==
After Anthrax finished touring in support of Fistful of Metal, vocalist Neil Turbin was fired: Matt Fallon replaced him, but was quickly fired because he lacked confidence in the studio.

Producer Carl Canedy suggested the group to audition Joey Belladonna, who was not familiar with thrash metal: though the band members were not pleased with Belladonna's musical background, they hired him and booked a few shows with their new frontman.

Spreading the Disease was recorded at the Pyramid Sound Studios in Ithaca, New York in August 1986, with Canedy, while Jon Zazula served as executive producer. The album featured the single "Madhouse", for which a music video was produced, but it did not receive much airplay on MTV, because the station believed the content was degrading to people with mental illnesses.

It was the last Anthrax album to feature songwriting from Turbin. This was also the first to feature songwriting from bassist Dan Lilker after his departure from the band, though more of his songwriting would be featured on the following album, Among the Living. Turbin wrote the lyrics for "Armed and Dangerous" and "Gung-Ho", and Lilker contributed to the music. Zazula was given songwriting credit for "Medusa", his only contribution for Anthrax. Zazula was originally credited as the sole writer of the song, but album reissues credit the rest of the band as well. Former vocalist Matt Fallon, who was fired during the recording sessions, claimed in a 2016 interview that he contributed to the lyrics but was left uncredited.

After recording Spreading the Disease, guitarist Scott Ian, drummer Charlie Benante and Lilker, who had joined Nuclear Assault, founded the Stormtroopers of Death and recorded the crossover thrash album Speak English or Die.

In his autobiography, I'm the Man: The Story of That Guy from Anthrax (2014: 91), Scott Ian said the acronym in the song "A.I.R." stands for "Adolescence in Red" and that it was a wordplay of his on George Gershwin's Rhapsody in Blue. The outro of "Gung-Ho" is a rondo from "Sinfonie de Fanfares" by the Baroque composer Jean-Joseph Mouret.

== Cover art ==
The cover art was made by Peter Corriston and Dave Heffernon, who had worked on Led Zeppelin's Physical Graffiti sleeve. Benante came up with the concept of a man being investigated for radiation levels.

== Reception ==
Professional ratings
Review scores
Source	Rating
AllMusic	4/5 stars
Kerrang!	4.5/5 stars
The New Rolling Stone Album Guide	3.5/5 stars
Collector's Guide to Heavy Metal	10/10
Sputnikmusic	4/5 stars
Encyclopedia of Popular Music	4/5 stars
Record Collector	3/5 stars

In a contemporary review, Howard Johnson of the British magazine Kerrang! recommended the album as the best example of thrash metal and equated Anthrax to Metallica in terms of songwriting capability.

More recently, AllMusic's Steve Huey said the album was a great leap forward from its predecessor and one of Anthrax's finest. He praised the lyrics for paying tribute to fictional characters as in "Lone Justice" and "Medusa".

Canadian journalist Martin Popoff calls the album "a shocking blast of noise from a long-haired bunch of punks that knew their own business", praising the "deceptively chaotic songcraft" and Belladonna's vocals.

Sputnikmusic's Mike Stagno also liked Belladonna's vocals, as well as the tight riffs of guitarists Ian and Spitz. Stagno said Spreading the Disease had "excellent" sound and production and recommended the album for fans of thrash metal.

British author Joel McIver described Spreading the Disease as "the sound of pure determination, at a point in metal history where boundaries were being pushed every day."

== Track listing ==
Liner notes are adapted from the original LP. Lead guitar by Dan Spitz, except where noted.

All tracks are written by Anthrax except where noted.

Side one
No.	Title	Lead guitar	Length
1.	"A.I.R."	2nd solo — Scott Ian	5:45
2.	"Lone Justice"		4:36
3.	"Madhouse"	intro solo — Ian	4:19
4.	"S.S.C./Stand or Fall"		4:08
5.	"The Enemy"		5:25

Side two
No.	Title	Lyrics	Music	Lead guitar	Length
6.	"Aftershock"			2 solo — Ian	4:28
7.	"Armed and Dangerous"	Neil Turbin	Anthrax, Danny Lilker	harmonised solo — Ian	5:43
8.	"Medusa"	Jon Zazula			4:44
9.	"Gung-Ho"	Turbin	Anthrax, Lilker	2 solo — Ian	4:34
Total length:					43:40

30th Anniversary Edition disc 1 bonus track
No.	Title	Lead guitar	Length
10.	"Medusa" (Joey Belladonna demo)	2 solo — Ian	4:45
Total length:			48:25

30th Anniversary Edition disc 2 tracks
No.	Title	Length
11.	"A.I.R." (Live at Sun Plaza, Tokyo 1987)	6:21
12.	"Metal Thrashing Mad" (Live at Sun Plaza, Tokyo 1987)	2:48
13.	"The Enemy" (Live at Sun Plaza, Tokyo 1987)	6:11
14.	"Madhouse" (Live at Sun Plaza, Tokyo 1987)	3:57
15.	"Howling Furies" (Live at Sun Plaza, Tokyo 1987)	4:02
16.	"Armed and Dangerous" (Live at Sun Plaza, Tokyo 1987)	4:31
17.	"Gung-Ho" (Live at Sun Plaza, Tokyo 1987)	6:08
18.	"Soldiers of Metal" (Live at Sun Plaza, Tokyo 1987)	2:57
19.	"Lone Justice" (Rhythm track, November 1984)	4:40
20.	"Gung-Ho" (Rhythm track, November 1984)	4:24
21.	"Metal Thrashing Mad" (Rhythm track, November 1984)	2:45
22.	"Raise Hell" (Rhythm track, November 1984)	3:57
23.	"Stand or Fall" (Rhythm track, November 1984)	3:43
24.	"Aftershock" (Rhythm track, November 1984)	4:32
25.	"Armed and Dangerous" (Rhythm track, November 1984)	5:46
26.	"Madhouse" (Rhythm track, November 1984)	4:09
27.	"The Enemy" (Rhythm track, November 1984)	5:29
Total length:		76:30

== Personnel ==
Liner notes are adapted from the original LP.

Anthrax

- Joey Belladonna – vocals
- Scott Ian – guitars
- Dan Spitz – guitars
- Frank Bello – bass guitar
- Charlie Benante – drums

Production

- Jon Zazula – executive producer
- Carl Canedy – producer, assistant engineer
- Anthrax – producers
- Alex Perialas – engineer
- Norman Dunn – assistant engineer
- Charlie Benante – album cover concept

== Charts ==
Chart (1985)	Peak position
US Billboard 200	113

Chart (2025)	Peak position
Greek Albums (IFPI)	45
