= WOSTEP =

WOSTEP, the Watchmakers of Switzerland Training and Educational Program, is an internationally recognized professional qualification in the maintenance and care of fine-quality watches. It was devised by the Centre Suisse de Formation et de Perfectionnement Horloger and is sponsored by manufacturers and retailers within the horological industry in Switzerland.

== Origin ==
During the 1960s, and at the request of the U.S. government, the Swiss government created what would eventually evolve into WOSTEP- Federation of the Swiss Watch Industry FH. Its original purpose was to train American watchmakers in techniques of watchmaking that developed in Geneva and the Jura Mountains from the 16th century.

There had always been a small number of imports of ultra-fine Swiss watches, but after WWII, the number of watches imported as partial or complete watches increased exponentially. These "modern" watch movements were markedly different from the products of American companies, which grew out of 100 years of production (starting mass production of quality watches). American manufacturers were unable to develop new products or methods of competing, and they were destroyed in record time.

== Worldwide training programs ==
The Federation developed an 11-month training program in which a watchmaker was flown to Neuchâtel, Switzerland, and trained by any one of many talented instructors that worked at WOSTEP over the years.

Also, one can attend a selected school that is offered in limited locations outside of Switzerland.

Recent changes in structure have assured the survival of WOSTEP as a foundation with a chateau converted to the school building. With the retirement of long-time director Antoine Simonin and his wife, the next generation has taken the reins and continues to develop courses for full training used throughout the world at their WOSTEP-Partnership Schools. The school also provides a variety of industry-specific training to companies and practicing watchmakers.
