= Fistful of Metal =

Studio album by Anthrax
- Released: January 6, 1984
- Recorded: Late 1983
- Studio: Pyramid (Ithaca, New York)
- Genres: Thrash metal, speed metal
- Length: 35:33
- Label: Megaforce
- Producer: Carl Canedy

Anthrax chronology
| Fistful of Metal (1984) | Armed and Dangerous (1985) |

Singles from Fistful of Metal
- 1. "Soldiers of Metal" Released: November 1983

Fistful of Metal is the debut studio album by the American heavy metal band Anthrax, released in January 1984 by Megaforce Records in the United States and Music for Nations internationally. This is the band's only album to feature vocalist Neil Turbin and original bassist Dan Lilker, who were replaced by Matt Fallon (and eventually by seventh vocalist Joey Belladonna) and Frank Bello, respectively. Former original guitarist Greg Walls claims that Anthrax "ripped him off" as he claims he wrote the material on the album.

== Background ==
Schoolmates Danny Lilker and Scott Ian formed Anthrax in 1981 in New York City. They both played guitar, but Lilker switched to bass when they could not find a suitable bassist. In 1982, after some lineup rotations, Anthrax added vocalist and fellow schoolmate Neil Turbin. Drummer Charlie Benante and lead guitarist Dan Spitz were added in 1983. Anthrax recorded a five-track demo in early 1983, which led to the band signing with Jon Zazula's Megaforce Records. The label issued a seven-inch single of "Soldiers of Metal / Howling Furies", which sold 3,000 copies in two weeks. Fistful of Metal was recorded in Pyramid Sound Studios in Ithaca, New York and produced by Carl Canedy, drummer in The Rods. The album was released in January 1984 by Megaforce in the US, Music for Nations in the UK, and Roadrunner in Europe.

Shortly after the release of Fistful of Metal, Lilker was fired by Turbin who didn't inform the rest of the band about his decision. In Lilker's own words "After I was thrown out, the guys unfairly said, "Well, it took him 30 times to record the bass track for 'I'm Eighteen,'" and if you listen to the bass track, if you didn't know the whole story, you would say, "Well, that's weird, isn't it?" It's only, like, five notes." The band, at Ian and Benante's insistence, hired Charlie's nephew, Frank Bello, as Lilker's replacement. Turbin had contributed song ideas, lyrics, titles and arrangements to most songs on the album, as well as three songs from the second album Spreading the Disease, but Ian and Benante, who played guitar in addition to drums, felt they needed tighter control on the songwriting. Due to a songwriting partnership between Ian and Benante, with Ian wanting to be more of a central focal point he began writing the lyrics and Benante the music, Turbin was forced out of the band a few weeks after the Roseland Ballroom show with Metallica. Music journalist Eddie Trunk stated: "Early on, I told Jon Zazula that what I didn't like about Anthrax was singer Neil Turbin's vocals." He admits in his writing to pressuring Zazula and Anthrax into firing Turbin from the band. The band did not rehire Lilker when given the opportunity and instead opted for then Anthrax roadie Frank Bello. Former guitarist Greg Walls said he was shocked that the album was released without giving credit to Walls as the primary songwriter on "Panic" and "Metal Thrashing Mad", as well as smaller songwriting contributions throughout the album.

== Release ==
Fistful of Metal was released in January 1984. It was released as a double album by Music for Nations in the UK, featuring extra mixes of "Soldiers of Metal" and "Howling Furies", which were not included on the US edition. Megaforce repackaged a compilation of Fistful of Metal and the 1985 extended play Armed and Dangerous in 2005, which featured a different artwork and some liner notes, but excluded any new mixes and bonus tracks. Commemorating its 25th anniversary, Megaforce reissued the album on three colored 10-inch LPs, also including Armed and Dangerous.

== Reception ==
Professional ratings
Review scores
| Source | Rating |
|---|---|
| AllMusic | 2/5 stars |
| Collector's Guide to Heavy Metal | 8/10 |
| Encyclopedia of Popular Music | 2/5 stars |
| The Rolling Stone Album Guide | 2/5 stars |

Critical reception to Fistful of Metal was mixed. Xavier Russel of Kerrang! called it a great debut album, with songs played "at a hundred miles an hour" which could just have been "slightly more original." Writing in the Encyclopedia of Popular Music, Colin Larkin called the cover art "tasteless", but commended the album's small, but steady commercial performance. AllMusic's Steve Huey said Anthrax had not found its distinctive style yet, sounding more like a Judas Priest cover band. Huey found the lyrics utilizing heavy metal stereotypes and opined fans would find the record "off-putting". Canadian journalist Martin Popoff praised the well-produced sound and the "almost operatic anti-thrash vocals" from Turbin, considering the album responsible for "putting New York back on the US metal map, and quality back in the books of bruising and uncompromising underground metal." In contradiction with the popular belief, the term thrash metal was not used for the first time in the music press by Kerrang! journalist Malcolm Dome, referring to the song "Metal Thrashing Mad"., since it was printed earlier, at least twice (Metal Forces 1 and Metal Mania 13, both published in late 1983).

Guitar World magazine placed the album on their list of "New Sensations: 50 Iconic Albums That Defined 1984". In June 2019, Decibel inducted Fistful of Metal in their Hall of Fame, due to its reputation as one of the best early examples of thrash metal.

Despite its acclaim, Fistful of Metal is considered to be one of Anthrax's least represented studio albums. Most of the songs from the album have rarely been played live since the band rose to popularity with their next two albums, Spreading the Disease and Among the Living, although "Deathrider", "Metal Thrashing Mad", "Panic", "Soldiers of Metal", "Anthrax" and "Across the River" have seen periodic revivals in later years. No songs from this album have ever appeared on any of the band's compilation albums, including Return of the Killer A's, Madhouse: The Very Best of Anthrax and Anthrology: No Hit Wonders (1985–1991), though they did re-record the heavily requested "Deathrider", "Metal Thrashing Mad", "Panic", and "Anthrax" for their 2004 album The Greater of Two Evils (the latter appearing on the 2-disc Japanese version as a bonus track).

In 1986, the album was banned in Germany by the Federal Department for Media Harmful to Young Persons for its violent cover artwork. The ban has since expired.

== Track listing ==
All writing credits for Fistful of Metal are adapted from the album’s liner notes, except contributions from Greg Wells.

Side one
| No. | Title | Writer(s) | Length |
|---|---|---|---|
| 1. | "Deathrider" | Dan Lilker, Scott Ian, Neil Turbin, Dan Spitz, Charlie Benante | 3:12 |
| 2. | "Metal Thrashing Mad" | Greg Wells, Lilker, Ian, Turbin, Spitz, Benante | 2:42 |
| 3. | "I'm Eighteen" (Alice Cooper cover) | Alice Cooper, Glen Buxton, Michael Bruce, Dennis Dunaway, Neal Smith | 4:06 |
| 4. | "Panic" | Wells, Lilker, Ian, Turbin | 4:02 |
| 5. | "Subjugator" | Lilker, Ian, Turbin, Spitz, Benante | 4:43 |

Side two
| No. | Title | Writer(s) | Length |
|---|---|---|---|
| 6. | "Soldiers of Metal" | Lilker, Ian, Turbin | 3:00 |
| 7. | "Death from Above" | Ian, Turbin, Spitz | 5:10 |
| 8. | "Anthrax" | Lilker, Ian, Turbin | 3:29 |
| 9. | "Across the River" (instrumental) | Lilker, Ian | 1:26 |
| 10. | "Howling Furies" | Lilker, Ian | 3:54 |
| Total length: | | | 35:33 |

1987 Japan Release ("Fistful of Anthrax")
| No. | Title | Writer(s) | Length |
|---|---|---|---|
| 6. | "Raise Hell" | Turbin, Spitz, Ian, Bello, Benante | 4:03 |
| 12. | "Panic" (live) | Lilker, Turbin, Ian | 3:42 |

== Personnel ==
Credits are adapted from the album's liner notes.

=== Anthrax ===
- Scott Ian – rhythm guitar, lead guitar ("I'm Eighteen")
- Dan Spitz – lead guitar, rhythm guitar ("I'm Eighteen")
- Neil Turbin – vocals
- Danny Lilker – bass
- Charlie Benante – drums

=== Production ===
- Jon Zazula – executive producer
- Carl Canedy – producer
- Chris Bubacz – engineer
- Alex Perialas – assistant engineer; CD mastering (1987 CD Reissue)
- Jack Skinner – mastering
- Kent Joshpe – illustration & logo
- Sharold Studios – artwork
- Ed Trunk – CD preparation (1987 CD Reissue)
- Mark Weinberg – CD design (1987 CD Reissue)
