= Red Lamb =

American heavy metal band

- Origin: Palm Beach, Florida, U.S.
- Genres: Heavy metal; thrash metal
- Years active: 2010–present
- Label: MIG Records
- Members: Dan Spitz; Don Chaffin
- Past members: Patrick Johansson; Chris Vrenna; Dave Mustaine
- Website: redlambofficial.com

Red Lamb is an American heavy metal supergroup formed in 2010 in Palm Beach, Florida. Members of the band have included Dan Spitz, Don Chaffin, Patrick Johansson and Chris Vrenna. The band released one self-titled album.

== Band members ==
Current

- Dan Spitz – guitars (2010–present) (ex-Anthrax)
- Don Chaffin – lead vocals (2010–present)

Former

- Dave Mustaine – vocals (2011–2012) (Megadeth)
- Chris Vrenna – programming, synths (Nine Inch Nails, Marilyn Manson)
- Patrick Johansson – drums (W.A.S.P.)
- Randy Coven – bass

== Discography ==
- Red Lamb (2012)
