= Neil Turbin =

American singer (born 1963)

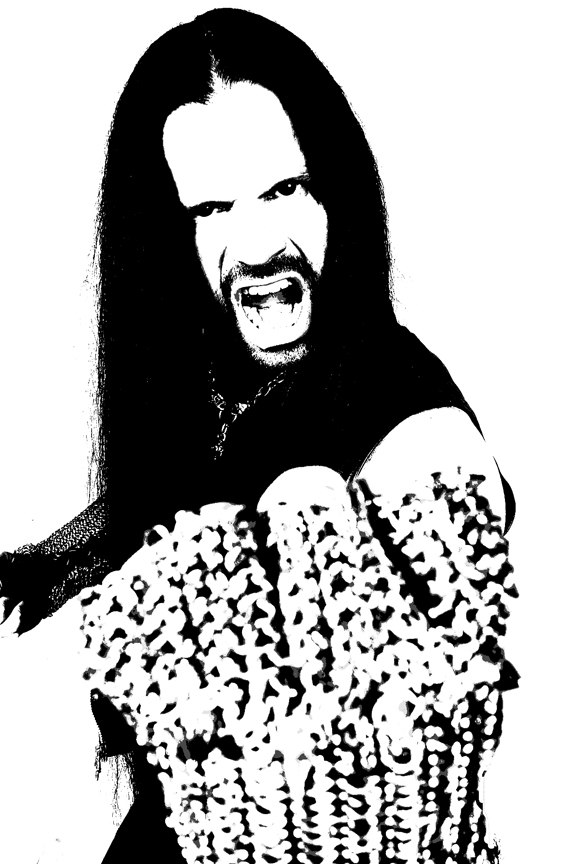

Background information
- Born: December 24, 1963 (age 62); Brooklyn, New York, U.S.
- Genres: Heavy metal; thrash metal; speed metal
- Occupations: Singer, songwriter
- Years active: 1978–present
- Website: deathriders.com

Neil Turbin (born December 24, 1963) is an American singer known for being the first vocalist for thrash metal band Anthrax, in which he appeared on their first studio album and two special collectors edition songs (Soldiers Of Metal, Howling Furies) included on some versions of Armed And Dangerous. He is the current lead vocalist of DeathRiders, and a member of hard rock band Bleed the Hunger.

== Career ==
=== Anthrax ===
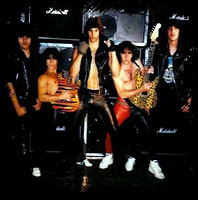
Turbin with Anthrax in 1983

Neil Turbin’s first band while he attended Bayside High School 1979, 1980, 1981 was The Newrace which he formed along with Karel Lukas guitar, Kasidis Sangbhundu drums, Alex Brignoll bass in 1979. Kasidis also attended the same school and was a year ahead of Neil. Neil was 15 and after he had bought his first Peavey Column PA System at Gracins Music in Long Island. In those times you needed to own your own PA System. The Newrace frequently gigged at CBGB’s, Max’s Kansas City, Great Gildersleeves, RT Firefly in lower Manhattan. The Newrace recorded a video for the song “Strange Eyes” filmed onsite at the World Trade Center grounds in 1981. The footage was filmed on a 1” video tape and Karel arranged for the video filming. Soon after The Newrace split and went their separate ways. Neil was in college and joined the band AMRA for a few months and started to write songs together.

When Turbin was first contacted by Anthrax he was already in a band called AMRA, but left after a few months, which prompted him to answer Anthrax's advertisement. He attended the same high school as Scott Ian and Danny Lilker, Bayside High School in New York City, and was in a class with Ian in his freshman year. Scott’s brother Jason Rosenfeld who was 14 at the time was singing at the first couple of shows as an amateur since he wasn’t yet mature enough to be a professional singer. Scott basically instructed him on how he wanted him to sing. Neil Turbin joined after meeting with Scott, Danny and Greg Walls and rehearsing with this first lineup which included original drummer Dave Weiss on drums as the band's first professional vocalist in August 1982. His first performance with Anthrax was at Great Gildersleeves on September 12, 1982.

He performed and recorded with the band on the original demo recordings and their first studio album, Fistful of Metal. Turbin wrote the lyrics to all songs on that album (with exception of the cover of Alice Cooper's "I'm Eighteen"). He also has writing credits on five of the seven songs on the band's Armed and Dangerous EP, as well as two songs on Spreading the Disease, both of which were recorded by third Anthrax vocalist Joey Belladonna, who replaced second Anthrax vocalist Matt Fallon.

Turbin's exit from Anthrax came two weeks after the band's first North American tour, "Anthrax US Attack Tour 1984", ending with a show at Roseland Ballroom on August 3.

Turbin was a key songwriter and major contributor writing all the lyrics and providing the main concepts to such well known metal anthems such as "Metal Thrashing Mad", "Armed and Dangerous", "Deathrider" and "Gung Ho" which were featured on Anthrax's first three releases as well as many subsequent live and greatest hits albums. Anthrax rose to #8 on the British charts with the release of Fistful of Metal.

In 2009, the video game Brütal Legend was released, featuring the Anthrax song "Metal Thrashing Mad" on its soundtrack, with Turbin's vocals and his song is also featured on the 2010 RIAA certified multi-platinum "The Big 4" Live in Sofia, Bulgaria CD/DVD.

Some of the songs Turbin wrote and recorded with the band have been re-recorded with different vocalists and appear on multiple albums and DVDs.

In 2021, Turbin along with other former members and music elite participated in "Anthrax 40th Anniversary Celebrations", which aired on Anthrax's official YouTube channel on May 3, 2021.

=== DeathRiders ===
DeathRiders is a band named after one of Turbin's songs and was formed in 2001 by Turbin to support his debut solo album, Threatcon Delta.

Deathriders toured Monterrey Metalfest, Mexico in 2005; Sweden Rock in 2006; Tokyo, Japan, and the US in 2008; Rocktower 2009 Germany; Nightmare on St. Pauli Festival Germany 2009; Headbangers Open Air Germany 2009; and Expo Rock Tijuana 2010. They performed eight shows at the world-famous Whisky a Go Go in Hollywood in 2010. DeathRiders' Stay Screamin 2011 European Tour took them to Metal Bash 2011 in Germany; Highway To Dokk'em Open Air Festival 2011; and other venues throughout Tilburg, Netherlands, Vienna, Austria and Berlin, Germany.

DeathRiders were featured alongside Michael Angelo Batio, Faster Pussycat, and Phil Lewis of L.A. Guns at Rainbow Bar & Grill's 41st anniversary outdoor party on April 21, 2013. They also performed at NAMM Metal Jam at Whisky a Go Go in West Hollywood, California on January 23, 2013, which featured many well-known metal artists including current and past members of Queensrÿche, Dio's Disciples, Racer X and Michael Schenker Group.

In 2014, the band toured Europe Headbangers Open Air Brande-Hoernerkirchen, Germany, and the Headbangers Open Air 2014 warm-up show at Lauschbar in Itzehoe, Germany. DeathRiders' Fistful of Metal Alive 2014 European tour included numerous dates in Netherlands including in Dynamo Eindhoven, with an all-Dutch touring lineup.

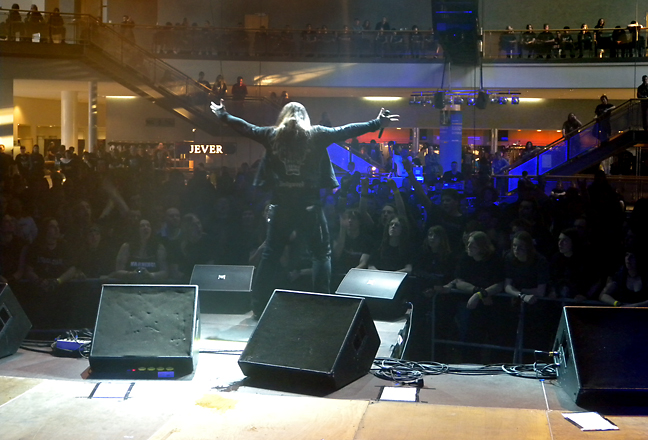
Neil Turbin Live Rocktower Germany 2009

In 2015, the band performed at NAMM Metal Jam and Neil and Michael's Metal Jam, with Michael Angelo Batio joining the band on guitar at The Slidebar in Fullerton, California. DeathRiders featuring Neil Turbin - Vocals, Jonas Hornqvist - Guitar, Richard Svard - Bass, Matt Thompson (King Diamond) - Drums, Andy LaRocque (King Diamond) - Producer released Never Surrender video and single on June 21, 2021 on BandCamp and DeathRidersChannel official Youtube as well as Rayzor Distro.

=== Bleed the Hunger ===
Bleed the Hunger was formed by Turbin and DeathRiders recording guitarist Jonas Hornqvist in January 2015.

=== Screamin Soul Demon ===
Screamin Soul Demon Neils Rock N Soul band performed live on mainstream radio stations with Screamin Soul Demon in 2020 on Real Talk With GLove - Florida Man Radio Orlando FM 105.5 / 660 AM and The Answer San Diego FM 96.1 / AM 107.1 Neil Turbin - Vocals, Guitar Erik Stone - Bass Patrick Johansson - Drums Geff Becerill - Keyboards Nate Montalvo - Guitar

=== Sticky Wicked ===
Sticky Wicked is a side project band that includes Turbin, Rowan Robertson, Jay Singh and Clackers Kay. The band actively toured in California in 2015.

=== The Metal Voice ===
Co-host and music journalist since 2015, Turbin has been on 200+ episodes and interviewed icons of rock, metal and film for The Metal Voice, with Jimmy Kay and Alan Dixon based in Montreal Canada.

=== 2019 Metal Hall of Fame inductee ===
In 2019, Turbin received an official red carpet induction into the Metal Hall of Fame by Pat Gesualdo, President of the Metal Hall of Fame, at the Bowl for Ronnie charity event, on November 7, 2019, held at Pinz Bowling Center in Studio City, California.

=== Singing lessons via Vocal Firepower ===
In 2020, Turbin offered one-on-one master vocal lessons, Vocal Firepower, online and in-person through vocalfirepower.com One of Neil's early students was Rick Rangel, guitarist/vocalist of Fueled by Fire. Other students included known singers in heavy metal, soul, and pop genres.

=== Ultimate Jam Night at Lucky Strike Live ===
Turbin was included in a regular lineup rotation at Ultimate Jam Night (now called Soundcheck Live) at Lucky Strike Live Hollywood in February, March, April and May 2015. He performed onstage on a regular weekly basis with Billy Sheehan, Monte Pittman, Chuck Wright, Jason Sutter, Jonathan "Sugarfoot" Moffett, Mitch Perry, Ira Black, Debby Holiday, Reinhold Schwarzwald, Howie Simon, Mayuko Okai, Tzusumi Okai, Rowan Robertson, Francesco DiCosmo, Anthony "Tiny" Biuso, Louis Metoyer, Sam Bam Koltun, Sean McNabb, Jeff Duncan, Shawn Duncan, Matt Duncan, Joe Lester, and The Atomic Punks.

=== Solo work ===
In 2003, Turbin released his first solo album, Threatcon Delta, on American record label "Metal Mayhem Music". The album contains 14 songs, including a cover of a Jimi Hendrix song and an AC/DC cover. Prominent guest musicians on the album include Claude Schnell, Jeff Scott Soto, Vernon Anderson, and Paul Shortino.

== Vocal style and range ==
Turbin is known for his high-pitched screams in his natural voice up to C6. He is the only early Big 4 vocalist to sing in this range, as demonstrated on the songs "Death from Above", "Deathrider", and "Metal Thrashing Mad" on Fistful of Metal.

== Influences ==
Turbin cites heavy metal and NWOBHM vocalists from bands such as Judas Priest, Deep Purple, Black Sabbath, AC/DC, Motörhead, Accept, Riot and Saxon as influences of his vocal style, although he was also heavily influenced by the New York punk scene of the 1970s–1980s including bands such as Generation X, Ramones, Niki Buzz, The Bullets, Vendetta, Mayday, Steve Johnstad, Son, Wayne County & the Electric Chairs, Neon Leon, Johnny Thunders & The Heartbreakers, The Clash, The Sex Pistols and MC5.

Turbin spent time at the infamous punk club CBGB's and worked at other important punk scene venues Ritz when it first opened and also Max's Kansas City, from 1979 to 1980. He has stated that he favors writing with a neo-classical, rhythm and blues, and soulful hard rock influence.

== Discography ==
=== DeathRiders ===
- The Metal Beast (2018) – recorded at Blue Pacific Studios in Los Angeles, California and Sonic Train Studios in Gothenburg, Sweden, by Andy La Rocque of King Diamond. Neil Turbin and additional mixing by Jared Kvitka and additional engineering by Androo O'Hearn of Shaolin Death Squad.

=== Neil Turbin ===
- Threatcon Delta (2003)

=== Anthrax ===
- "Soldiers of Metal" (single) (1984)
- Fistful of Metal (1984)
- Armed and Dangerous (EP) (1985) – songwriting credits only
- Spreading the Disease (1985) – songwriting credits only

=== Compilations ===
- 12 Commandments in Metal (1985) – "Soldiers of Metal" (Anthrax) (Roadrunner Records, Netherlands)
- Fistful of Anthrax (1987) – all tracks except "Raise Hell" and "Panic" (Anthrax) (Megaforce Records/Polydor, Japan)
- Precious Metal – "I'm Eighteen" (Anthrax) (Stylus Music)

=== Video games ===
- Brütal Legend (2009) (Electronic Arts) – "Metal Thrashing Mad" (Anthrax)

=== Guest appearances ===
- Kuni – Masque (1986)
- Robby Lochner (1997) – "Still Burning" and "Inside Information"
- DC to Daylight (1997) – "Still Burning" and "Inside Information"
- A Tribute to Limp Bizkit (2002) – "Faith"
- Jack Frost – Out in the Cold (2005) – "Crucifixation"
- Race Track Rock (antiMUSIC records compilation) (2007) – "Piece of Me"
- Quiet Riot – Hollywood Cowboys (2019) – "Change or Die", "Insanity" – Frontiers Records
- THOR – We Fight Forever (2021) – "We Fight Forever" – Cleopatra Records
- Sharyot - Produced by Neil Citron
- Jocephus and the George Jonestown Massacre Call Me Animal: A Tribute To The MC5 (2023) – "I Believe To My Soul" Saustex Records
