= Indians (song) =

Single by Anthrax

from the album Among the Living
- Released: 1987
- Recorded: 1986
- Genre: Thrash metal
- Length: 5:40
- Label: Island
- Songwriters: Joey Belladonna; Dan Spitz; Scott Ian; Frank Bello; Charlie Benante
- Producers: Anthrax; Eddie Kramer

Anthrax singles chronology
"I Am the Law" (1987)	"Indians" (1987)	"Make me Laugh" (1988)

Music video
- "Indians" on YouTube

"Indians" is a song by American thrash metal band Anthrax, from the band's third studio album, Among the Living (1987). It has since then remained one of the band's signature songs, appearing on their best-of albums: Return of the Killer A's, Madhouse: The Very Best of Anthrax and Anthrology: No Hit Wonders (1985–1991).

It appears in the Guitar Hero game Guitar Hero: Warriors of Rock and as downloadable content for the Rock Band series and Rocksmith 2014.

== Music video ==
The music video features Anthrax playing the song live. It was directed by Jean Pellerin.

== Single ==
A single was released, it was also the second single for the album, displaying a Native American on a coin (like that of a U.S. nickel and/or Indian Head cent) with a purple background.

=== Track listing ===
1. "Indians"
2. "Sabbath Bloody Sabbath" (includes "Taint" by Stormtroopers of Death after a fade out)

== Personnel ==
- Joey Belladonna – vocals
- Scott Ian – rhythm guitar
- Dan Spitz – lead guitar
- Frank Bello – bass
- Charlie Benante – drums

== Charts ==
Chart (1987)	Peak position
Finnish Singles (The Official Finnish Charts)	14
UK Singles (OCC)	44

== See also ==
- List of anti-war songs
