= I Am the Law (song) =

Single by Anthrax

from the album Among the Living
- Released: February 1987
- Genre: Thrash metal
- Length: 5:57
- Label: Island
- Songwriters: Joey Belladonna; Dan Spitz; Scott Ian; Frank Bello; Charlie Benante; Danny Lilker
- Producers: Anthrax; Eddie Kramer

Anthrax singles chronology
"Madhouse" (1985)	"I Am the Law" (1987)	"Indians" (1987)

"I Am the Law" is a song by American heavy metal band Anthrax. It was released as the first single from the band's third studio album, Among the Living (1987). A thrash metal classic, the song was included on their best-of albums Return of the Killer A's, Madhouse: The Very Best of Anthrax and Anthrology: No Hit Wonders (1985–1991).

The song is about the 2000 AD character Judge Dredd and includes references to many of the character's storylines up until 1987.

== Single ==
"I Am the Law" was released in 12-inch single format in 1987, with catalog ID 12IS316 from Island Records. Some versions came with a promo poster. It was also the first single for the album, displaying Judge Dredd's badge with the band's logo and a U.S. flag in the background.

=== Track listings ===
Side A

- 1. I Am the Law (04:05)

Side B

- 2. I'm the Man (03:04)
- 3. Bud E. Luvbomb and Satan's Lounge Band (02:40)

=== 7" picture disc ===
- 1. I Am the Law (04:13)
- 2. Bud E. Luvbomb and Satan's Lounge Band (02:47)

=== Coloured vinyl limited edition ===
- 1. I Am the Law (live)
- 2. Bud E. Luvbomb & Satan's Lounge Band
- 3. Madhouse (live)

Notes

- Live tracks recorded at the Hammersmith Odeon, England.

== Personnel ==
- Joey Belladonna – lead vocals
- Scott Ian – rhythm guitar, backing vocals
- Dan Spitz – lead guitar, backing vocals
- Frank Bello – bass, backing vocals
- Charlie Benante – drums

== Charts ==
Chart (1987)	Peak position
Netherlands (Single Top 100)	93
UK Singles (Official Charts)	32
