= Madhouse (song) =

Single by Anthrax

from the album Spreading the Disease
- B-side: "A.I.R., God Save the Queen"
- Released: October 7, 1985
- Recorded: 1985
- Genre: Thrash metal
- Length: 4:19
- Label: Megaforce, Island
- Songwriters: Joey Belladonna; Dan Spitz; Scott Ian; Frank Bello; Charlie Benante
- Producers: Carl Canedy; Anthrax

Anthrax singles chronology
"Soldiers of Metal" (1984)	"Madhouse" (1985)	"Armed and Dangerous" (1986)

Music video
- "Madhouse" on YouTube

"Madhouse" is a song by American thrash metal band Anthrax, released in 1985 on Megaforce Records and Island Records.

== Background ==
"Madhouse" was released as the only single and third track from the group's second full album, Spreading the Disease. The song is written in an up-tempo time signature, with heavy distorted guitar riffs. The song is about going insane.

It has become a staple of live concerts, and has also appeared on Anthrax's "best of" album, Anthrology: No Hit Wonders (1985–1991). In 2009, the track was named the 46th best hard rock song of all time by VH1.

The 12" vinyl features a cover version of the Sex Pistols song "God Save the Queen".

== Music video ==
A music video was produced, which features the band performing in an insane asylum with several mental patients moving along to the tune.

== Appearances ==
- This song is featured in the 2002 video game Grand Theft Auto: Vice City. It is featured on the in-game radio station "V-Rock".
- A cover version of this song was included in the 2006 rhythm game Guitar Hero II.
- This song was featured in an episode of the MTV series Nitro Circus.
- A live version of this song was available as downloadable content for the Rock Band series of rhythm games.
- This song is mentioned in the Stephen King short story Finn, first published in 2022.

== Covers ==
- The heavy metal band Pantera played the song live in their set in 1986-88
- Canadian thrash metal band Mortillery included a cover of the song as a bonus track on their 2013 album Origin of Extinction.

== Personnel ==
- Joey Belladonna – lead vocals
- Scott Ian – guitar (intro solo), backing vocals
- Dan Spitz – guitar (second solo), backing vocals
- Frank Bello – bass, backing vocals
- Charlie Benante – drums
