= Jon Zazula =

American music industry executive (1952–2022)

Jonathan Zazula (March 16, 1952 – February 1, 2022), also known as Jonny Z, was an American music industry executive who was the owner of New Jersey's Rock'n Roll Heaven record store and founder of record label Megaforce Records. Zazula's record store in East Brunswick, New Jersey made him a central figure of the East Coast metal scene, regularly playing demo tapes sent to him through his underground tape-trading network which included the likes of Brian Slagel of Metal Blade Records, Ron Quintana (the editor of Metal Mania magazine), and producer Mark Whitaker. He was also a mentor to radio personality Eddie Trunk.

== Career ==
His central role in the East Coast metal scene would later be an essential factor in launching the career of Metallica. Zazula offered the band their first opportunity to play in the New York area and organized their first tours with Raven, one of the leading metal bands from the UK at that time. After hearing the demo tape No Life 'Til Leather, he founded the label Megaforce Records with $180 and also Manowar signing to them, to release their work. Zazula released Metallica's debut album Kill 'Em All and set up an East Coast tour with private funding.

After the success of Kill 'Em All, Zazula signed and worked with other artists, including Disco Biscuits, Warren Haynes, Testament, Tad, Overkill, Frehley's Comet, King's X, Fozzy, Ministry, and Anthrax.

In 2019, Zazula released an auto-biography titled Heavy Tales.

== Personal life and death ==
Zazula was born on March 16, 1952, and was Jewish. His second wife, Marsha Zazula (née Marsha Jean Rutenberg; 1952–2021), was his partner and co-founder at Megaforce Records. They were married from 1979 until Marsha's death on January 10, 2021. Zazula had three daughters, including one with his first wife and two with his second wife (Marsha).

He died at his home in Clermont on February 1, 2022, at the age of 69, from complications of chronic inflammatory demyelinating polyneuropathy, COPD, and osteopenia.
