= Dan Spitz =

American guitarist (born 1963)

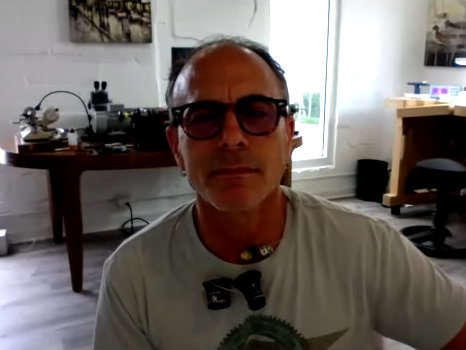
- Spitz in 2024

Background information
- Born: January 28, 1963 (age 63); Rockland County, New York, U.S.
- Genres: Thrash metal; heavy metal; hard rock
- Occupation: Guitarist • Watchmaker
- Years active: 1980–1995, 2005–2007, 2010–present
- Member of: Red Lamb, Voices of Extreme
- Formerly of: Anthrax, Overkill, DeuxMonkey
- Website: danspitz.com

Daniel Alan Spitz (born January 28, 1963) is an American musician and watchmaker best known for his work as the lead guitarist of the thrash metal band Anthrax from 1983 to 1995 and from 2005 to 2007. Spitz also founded the Christian music group Red Lamb, which was known for lyrics on autism awareness. Spitz has earned Swiss and American degrees in luxury mechanical watchmaking and micro-mechanical engineering, certified as watchmaker instructor for the North American operations of Swiss watch company Chopard.

== Career ==
Dan Spitz was an early member of Overkill in 1981 and joined Anthrax in 1983. From 1983 to 1995, he was lead guitarist and backing vocalist on the Anthrax albums Fistful of Metal, Armed and Dangerous, Spreading the Disease, Among the Living, State of Euphoria, Persistence of Time and Sound of White Noise. Anthrax sold more than 30 million albums worldwide during this period.

In 1995, Spitz left Anthrax to pursue a career in luxury Swiss watchmaking, attending the Swiss watchmaking school WOSTEP on a full scholarship. He was certified a Mechanical Complications Specialist, earning Swiss degrees in micro-mechanical engineering, and opened his own luxury watch service. In 2012 Spitz was voted the number 1 interview of the year for the watchmaking magazine Hodinkee. In 2016, the production company Great Big Story produced a documentary on Spitz's work as a watchmaker.

Spitz reunited with Anthrax for a classic lineup reunion tour in 2005, appearing on the tour DVD Alive 2. He left the band again in 2007 to return to his watchmaking career. In 2010 Spitz formed a new Christian rock/metal band Red Lamb, which also included singer Don Chaffin from Voices of Extreme and keyboardist Chris Vrenna. Dave Mustaine was an early member but ultimately stepped back into a songwriting role with Spitz. Mustaine and Spitz wrote the song "Puzzle Box" which was claimed to be the first heavy metal song to deal with autism; the song's video featured Bob and Suzanne Wright, co-founders of Autism Speaks. In 2017, Spitz formed another Christian thrash metal band with former Journey drummer Deen Castronovo.

== Personal life ==
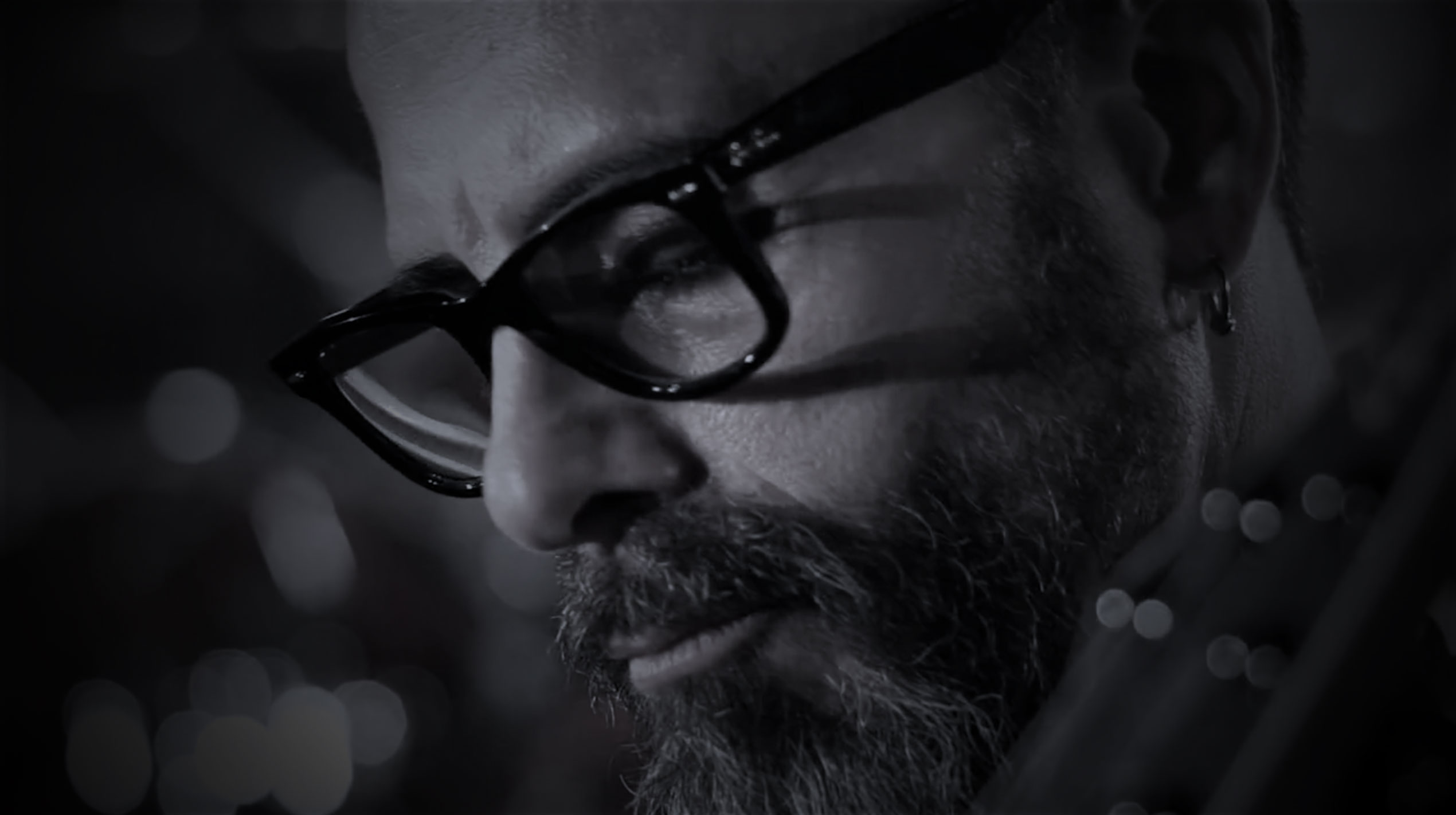
Spitz in 2017

Spitz was born in a small town in Rockland County, New York as the second son of a lawyer and a high school substitute teacher. Spitz comes from a Jewish family and converted to Christianity / Messianic Judaism in 1993. His older brother, Dave Spitz is also an accomplished heavy metal musician who has been a member of Black Sabbath and Great White.

In June 2009, Spitz had a massive heart attack, causing him to undergo an emergency triple bypass. He fully recovered but required stents in many arteries.

== Equipment ==
Spitz was originally known for his use of Jackson Guitars and he collaborated on guitar designs with Grover Jackson. During the Anthrax Reunion tour, Spitz endorsed Paul Reed Smith Guitars, using a custom model with a "Spitz" head stock.

In the early days of Anthrax, Spitz used Marshall amplifiers, using one of the first incarnations of a pre JCM800 derived from a collaboration with Jim Marshall. Around the time of "Among the Living," Spitz switched to Mesa/Boogie, using many Mark IIC heads modified by Spitz. During the Anthrax Reunion in 2005–2007, Spitz used Matchless heads and Marshall point-to-point wired 2203 modded heads he hand-built himself that were pushed by a Keeley-modded Boss DS-1.

== Discography ==
=== Anthrax ===
- Fistful of Metal (1984)
- Armed and Dangerous (1985)
- Spreading the Disease (1985)
- Among the Living (1987)
- State of Euphoria (1988)
- Persistence of Time (1990)
- Sound of White Noise (1993)
- Alive 2 (2005)

=== Red Lamb ===
- Red Lamb (2012)
