= Frank Bello =

American bassist

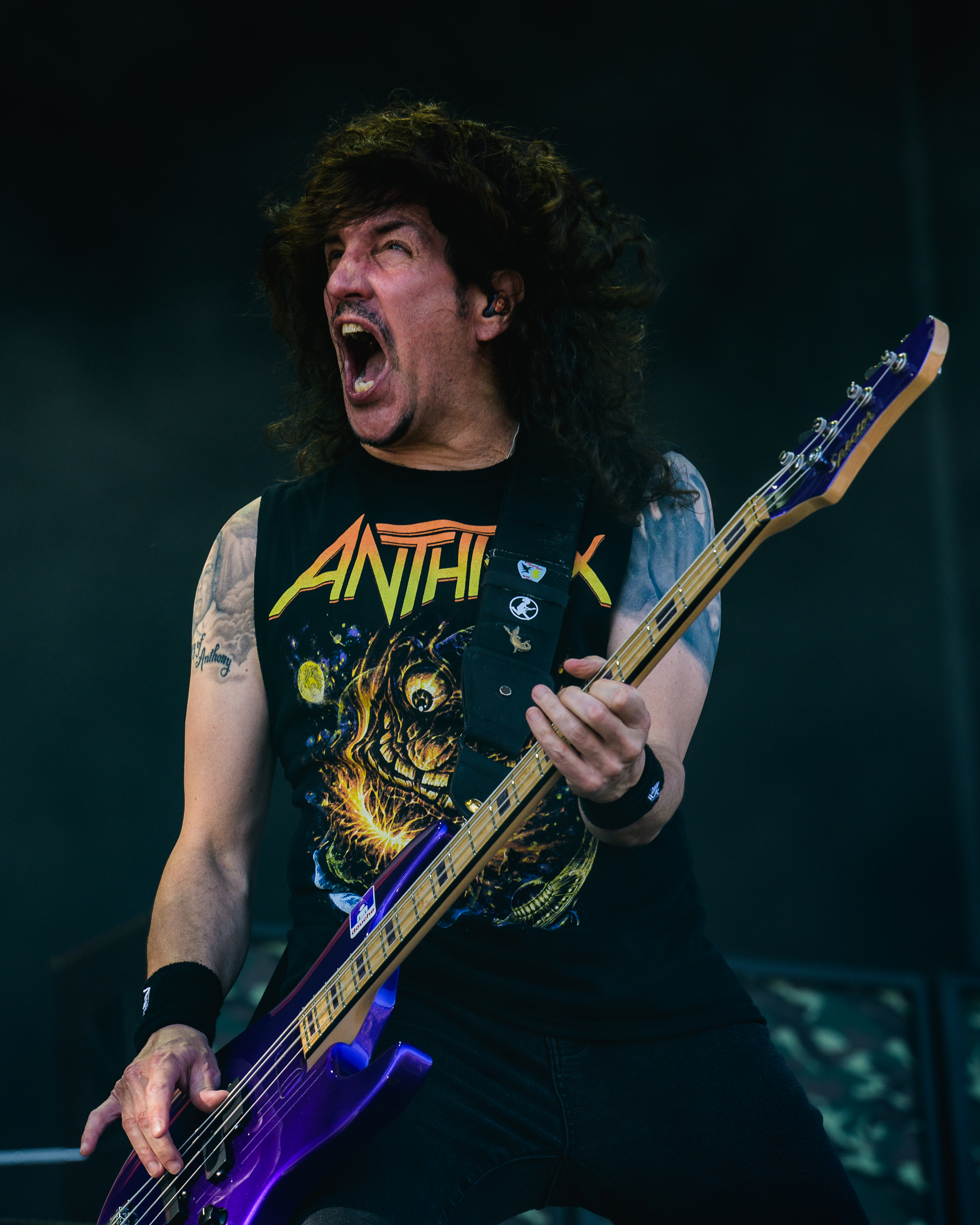
- With Anthrax at Tons of Rock, 2026

Background information
- Born: July 9, 1965 (age 61)
- Genres: Heavy metal; thrash metal; alternative metal; black metal
- Occupation: Musician
- Instrument: Bass guitar
- Years active: 1984–present
- Member of: Anthrax
- Formerly of: Helmet
- Website: anthrax.com

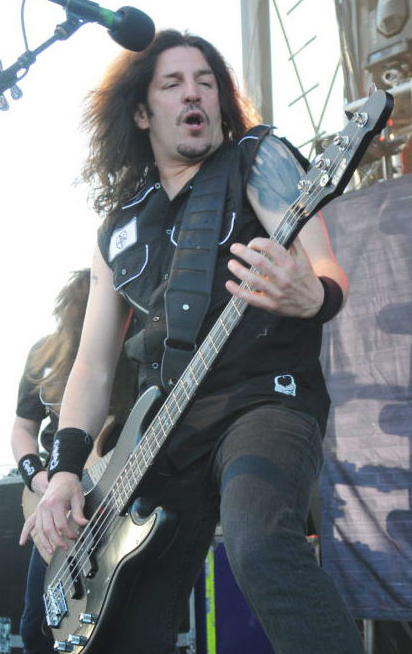
Bello performing with Anthrax in 2015

Frank Bello (born July 9, 1965) is an American musician who plays bass for the thrash metal band Anthrax. He was also a member of Helmet from 2004 to 2005 and was the touring bassist of Norwegian black metal band Satyricon in 2024.

== Early life ==
Bello was born into an Italian-American family, his parents divorced when he was young leaving his mother to raise him and five siblings. Following his parents separation his family moved in with his grandmother where he lived with his uncle Anthrax drummer Charlie Benante. During his teens he would work at his other uncles deli in between tours with Anthrax.

His younger brother Anthony was murdered in the Bronx, New York City, in 1996. His murder was never solved. Bello has a tattoo on his right upper arm with a design of Anthony's face, with the words 'In Memory of Anthony' below it.

== Career ==
Bello was originally a roadie and guitar technician for Anthrax, but later replaced Dan Lilker soon after the release of the band's 1984 debut album Fistful of Metal, and has held this position ever since, excluding a brief departure in 2004, during which he was a member of Helmet – another New York City-based metal band. His stint in Helmet was brief, as Bello reunited with Anthrax the following year, and has remained in the band since. In total he has appeared on 11 of the 12 Anthrax albums.

Bello has referred to Paul McCartney, Steve Harris, Gene Simmons, Geezer Butler, Geddy Lee, Chris Squire, Tom Petersson and Jaco Pastorius as influences and inspirations to his bass playing. He mostly plays bass fingerstyle, but also uses a pick on certain songs. For example he can be seen using one in the videos for "Room for One More" and "Fueled". He also used a pick most of the time during his stint with Helmet.

In 2014, Bello founded a side project Altitudes & Attitude alongside former Megadeth guitarist Dave Ellefson. The group released a self titled EP that same year and later released their debut album Get It Out via Megaforce Records in 2019. The group has a hard rock sound with Bello providing vocals. Much of the band’s lyrical themes touch upon Bello’s inner struggles throughout his life.

In May 2021, Bello announced the forthcoming publication of his autobiography, Fathers, Brothers, and Sons: Surviving Anguish, Abandonment, and Anthrax. The book's co-writer is British author Joel McIver and it includes a foreword by Gene Simmons of Kiss.

Bello released his debut solo EP in 2022, containing 3 songs along with excerpts from his autobiography.

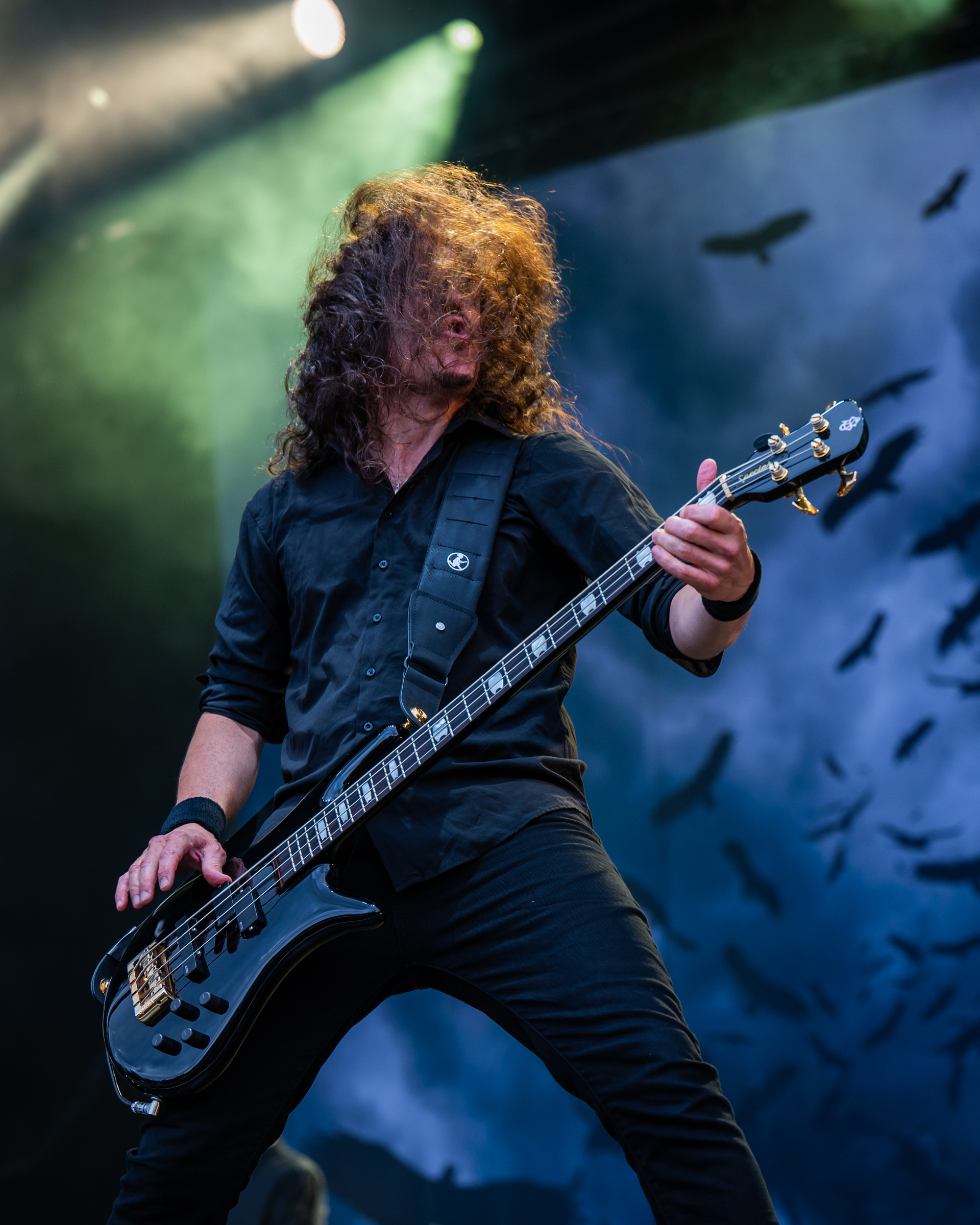
Bello with Satyricon in 2024

In 2024, Bello joined Satyricon as a touring member.

In 2025, Bello alongside Yungblood performed a cover of "Changes" at the Black Sabbath farewell concert Back to the Beginning. The recording of the cover won Bello his first Grammy Award for Best Rock Performance after receiving six other nominations as a member of Anthrax. In June of that year he revealed that he was working with Living Colour on the songwriting process of their new album.

=== Acting ===
Bello played Richard Hell in Greetings from Tim Buckley, a film on Tim and Jeff Buckley, which premiered at the 2012 Toronto International Film Festival. He also played a small role as a stick-up man in Joe's Apartment, and appeared in the intro scene in the Law & Order episode "The Brotherhood", credited as "Rocker". He also played himself in an episode of Married... with Children and Newsradio.

== Equipment ==
In the early days on Anthrax, Bello used an ESP Precision-styled bass, possibly a 400 series, that had EMG P-bass and J-bass pickups. ESP released this bass as a signature model, available only in Japan, in the mid-to-late 1980s. Sometime during the late 1980s, he switched to an ESP Surveyor P-bass, which had nearly all the same specifications of his previous basses, but with a finished headstock. He began using Fender basses during the beginning of the 1990s, due to a falling out with ESP which, according to ESP Vice President Jeff Moore, was due to miscommunication. He began using Fender P-basses around the time of Persistence of Time until the release of his signature model. Bello had a signature model Fender Jazz bass. The model combines a Fender Aerodyne body with a Precision Bass-width neck, Alder body wood (as opposed to the Aerodyne's Basswood) and a mix of Precision and Jazz bass pickups along with non-standard custom-chosen hardware. Pickups used on the bass are Seymour Duncan SPB-3 precision bass pickup in the neck position and a Samarium Cobalt Noiseless Jazz Bass pickup in the bridge position, although Bello's personal bass now is equipped with EMG HZ Passive pickups which Bello prefers "as the output is... a lot louder" and he gets "a lot more punch". Bello also had a signature Squier electric jazz bass. It features P/J style pick up combination and a skull inlay/body graphic.

The ESP Frank Bello and LTD FB-4 are both based on the ESP Vintage-4 model, customized to Belloʼs specifications with a Black Satin finish and black anodized aluminum pickguard, ebony fingerboard with black pearloid block inlays, EMG PJ-X active pickups and a Gotoh bridge. The basses feature bolt-on construction at 34" scale, an alder body, and maple neck with 21 XJ frets. There is a writing of "R.I.P. Dimebag" on Bello's bass guitar (Fender model) for tribute to deceased Pantera and Damageplan guitarist Dimebag Darrell, which he inscribed into his bass the night of his death. After constant touring with Megadeth's bass player, David Ellefson, Bello switched to a Hartke LH1000 and HyDrive cabinets. On tour, he also use a SansAmp Bass driver for a "grinding tone" for the "Got The Time" song. Previously, he used Ampeg SVT amplifiers and cabinets during the early 1980s, 1990s, and 2000s. During the late 1980s, he used a rack system that relied on a Yamaha PB1 Preamp and Crown Power Base-1 power amplifiers. While in Helmet, Bello used Fender 800-PRO amplifiers with a Sansamp Bass Driver DI distortion pedal.

In 2022 Charvel Guitars introduced a Frank Bello signature bass from their custom shop with a P Bass body, PJ EMG pickup configuration, Mirrored tele bass style pickguard and a maple neck and fretboard. Later in the year they released a Pro-Mod Mexican made version In 2023 Tech 21 release a Frank Bello signature SansAmp, the Street Driver 48

In 2024 it was announced that Bello had joined the Spector family of artists, with a signature model being released in June of 2025.

== Philanthropy ==
Bello has shown support for Little Kids Rock, a national nonprofit that works to restore and revitalize music education in disadvantaged U.S. public schools, by donating several bass guitars and amps to 15 New York City public schools. He also visited a Little Kids Rock classroom to show encouragement to young musicians, answer their questions, and jam with them on their favorite songs.

== Discography ==
=== With Altitudes & Attitude ===
- Altitudes & Attitude (2014)
- Get It Out (2019)

=== With others ===
- Helmet - Size Matters (album, 2004) credit only
- Crobot - "Mountain" (single, 2021)
- Frank Bello - "Then I'm Gone" (3-songs single, 2022).
- Yungblud - Changes (single, 2025) with Nuno Bettencourt
