= List of Anthrax members =

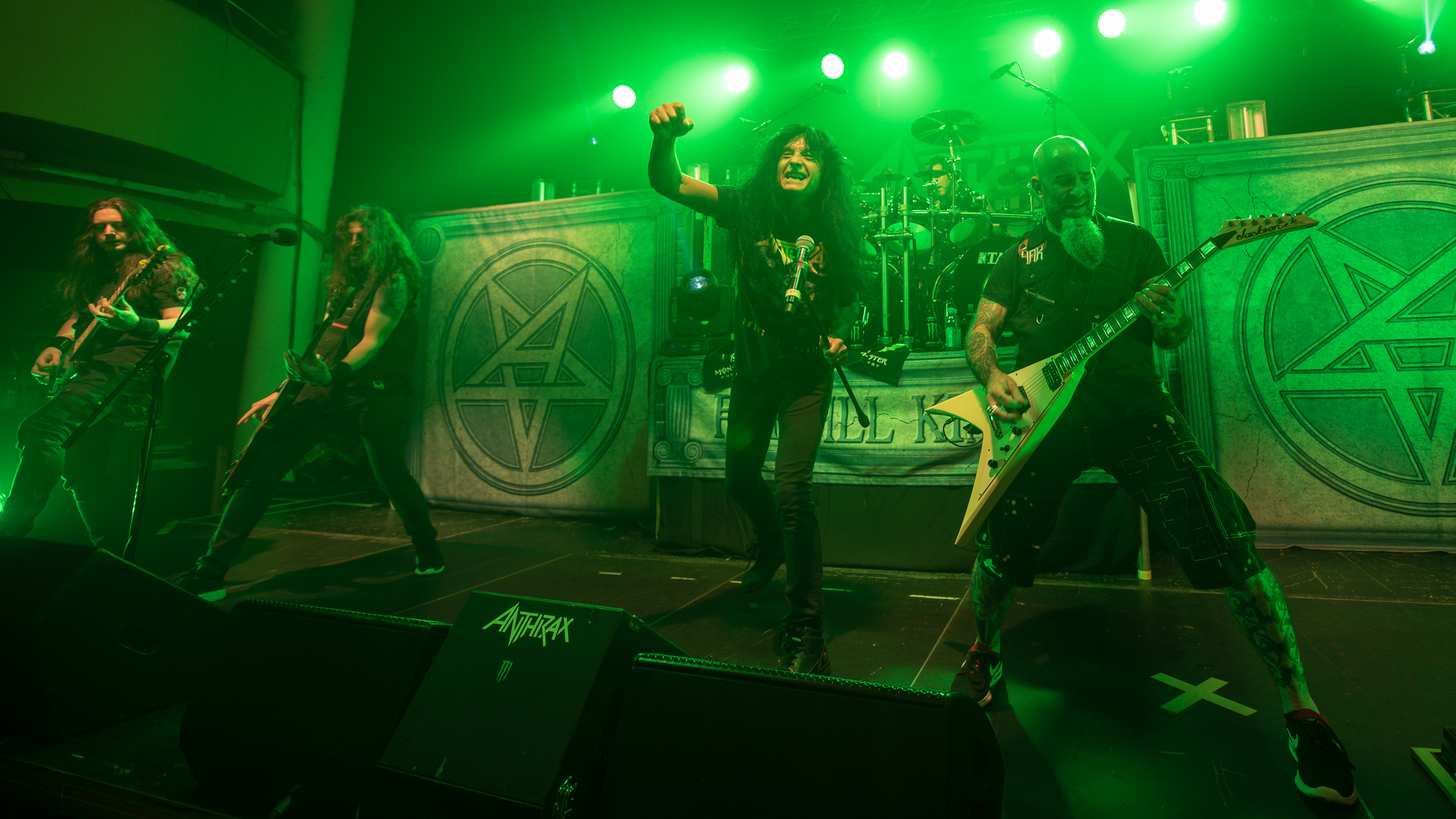
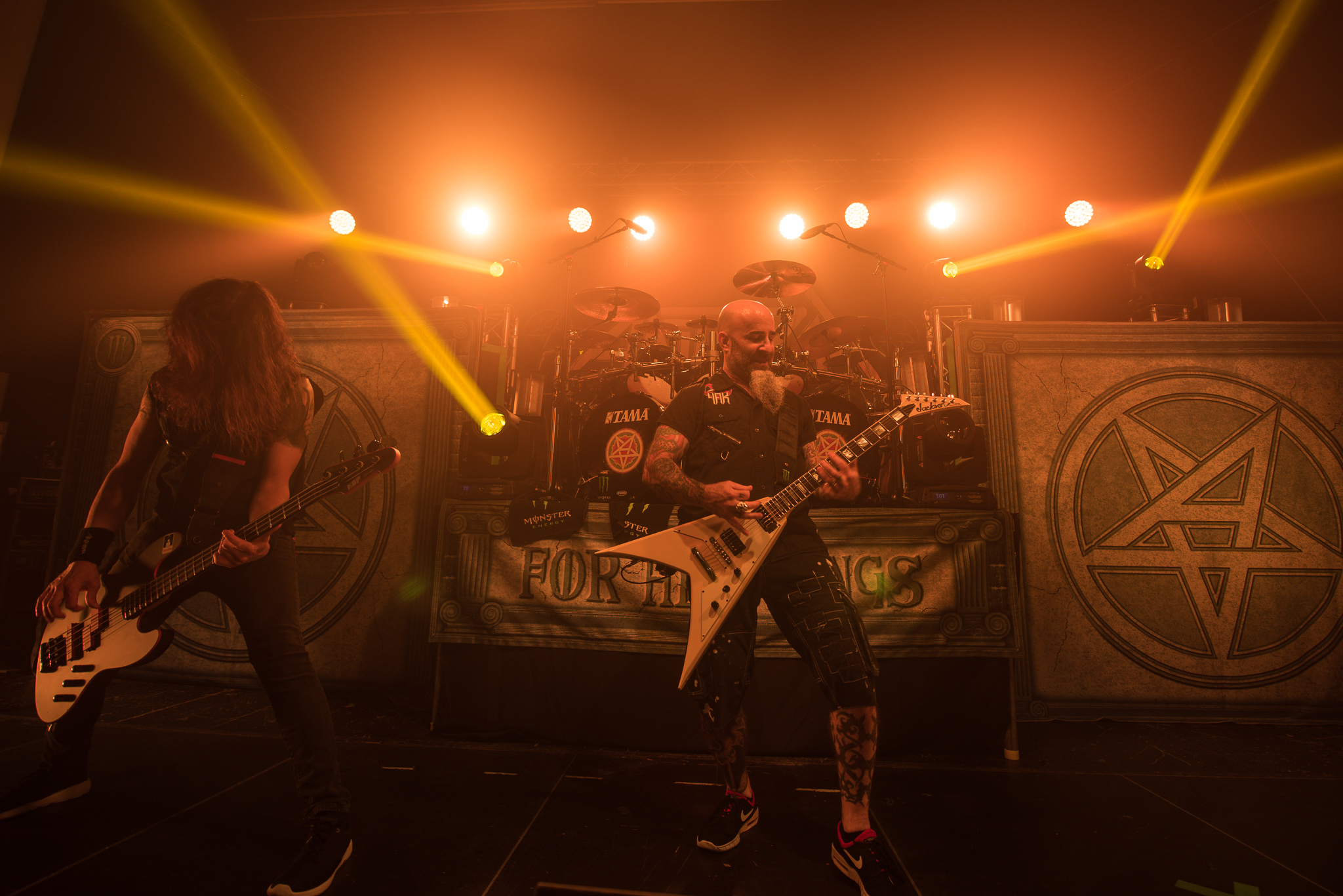
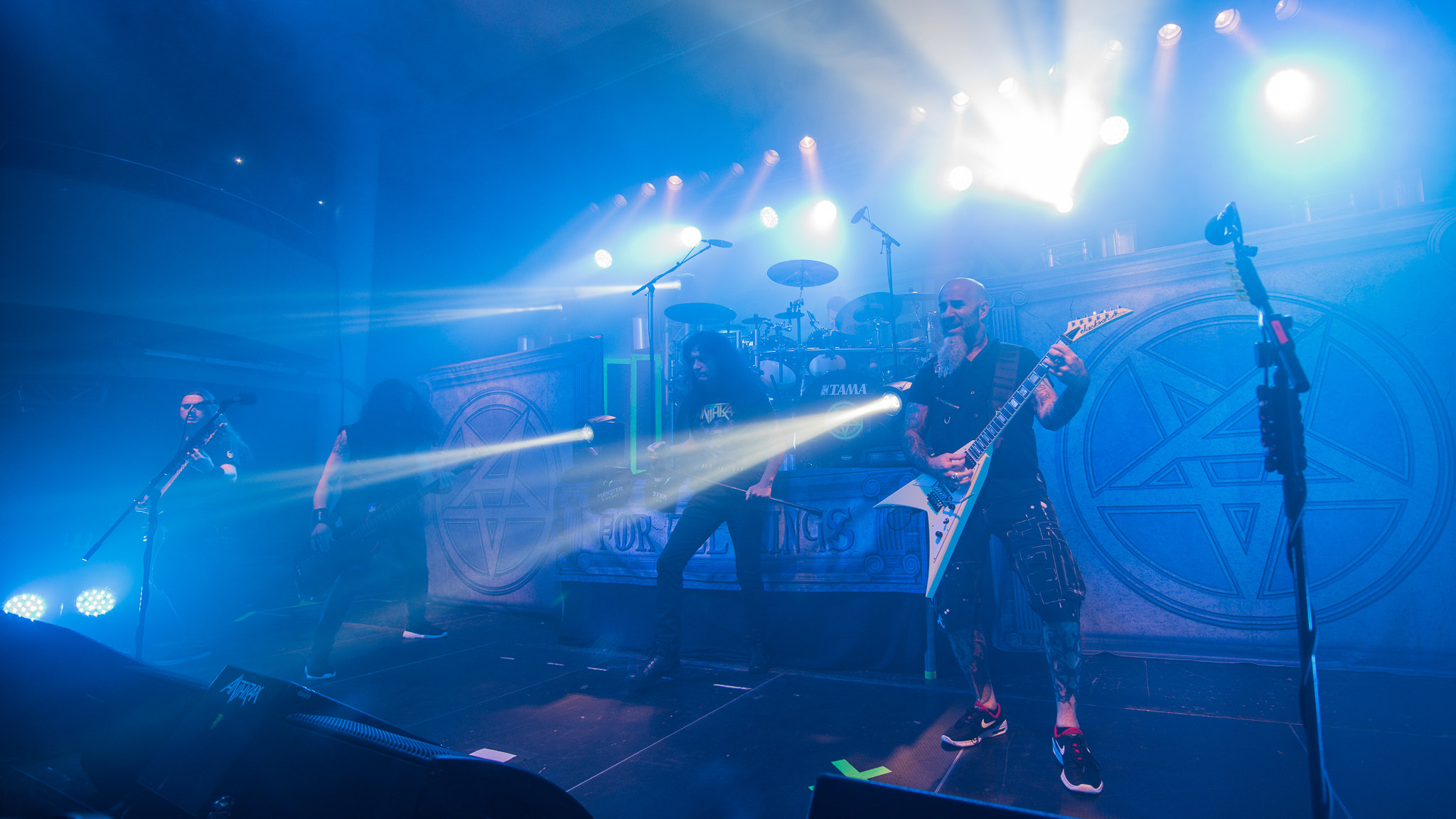
Anthrax performing live in 2017

Anthrax is an American thrash metal band from New York City. Formed in 1980, as Acid, the band was originally consisted of lead singer Joe Gelione, guitarist Scott Ian, bassist Dan Lilker and drummer Dave Weiss.

The band was renamed to Anthrax on July 18, 1981, and consisted of Scott on lead guitar, Lilker on rhythm guitar and Weiss. In August, lead singer John Connelly and bassist Paul Kahn.

The band has been through many personnel changes, and currently includes Scott on rhythm guitar, drummer Charlie Benante (since 1983), bassist Frank Bello (since 1984), lead singer Joey Belladonna (who first joined in 1984) and lead guitarist Jonathan Donais (since 2013).

== History ==
=== 1981–1992 ===
Anthrax was formed on July 18, 1981, by Scott Ian, Dan Lilker and Dave Weiss. One month later, John Connelly and Paul Kahn took over on vocals and bass, respectively, and Lilker switched to guitar.

The band went through many lineup changes in its early stages – Connelly was replaced by Dirk Kennedy, followed by Ian's brother Jason Rosenfeld, then Tommy Wise; Greg Walls spent two years with the group on lead guitar (Ian switched to rhythm guitar), followed briefly by Bob Berry; Kahn was replaced by Kenny Kushner, before Lilker took over on bass when Walls joined; and Weiss was replaced by Greg D'Angelo.

The band eventually settled in 1983 with a lineup including Ian and Lilker, lead vocalist Neil Turbin, who joined in August 1982, drummer Charlie Benante and lead guitarist Dan Spitz.

After signing with Jon Zazula's new thrash metal label Megaforce Records later in the year, Anthrax recorded its debut album Fistful of Metal.

Shortly after its January 1984 release, Turbin fired Lilker without consulting with the other members of the band, although Ian has since admitted that "there were issues" with the bassist. He was replaced by Frank Bello, band's roadie and Benante's nephew.

Tensions continued to grow between Turbin and the rest of the group as they toured throughout 1984, leading to his eventual departure on August 10. Turbin was briefly replaced by Matt Fallon, before Joey Belladonna joined later in the year.

After recording four studio albums with the band, Belladonna was fired from Anthrax in 1992 due to stylistic changes the group intended to take, with John Bush taking his place.

=== 1992 onwards ===
Dan Spitz left Anthrax on July 16, 1995 to become a professional watchmaker.

Guitars on Stomp 442 were recorded by Ian, Benante, Paul Crook and Pantera's Dimebag Darrell. Crook remained with Anthrax for touring and recording after the release of Stomp 442, although never became an official member. He was replaced on August 15, 2001, by former Boiler Room guitarist Rob Caggiano.

Bello briefly left on March 4, 2004, with Joey Vera temporarily taking his place. It was announced in September 2005 that Spitz, Bello and Belladonna would return to Anthrax for a reunion tour and potentially new recordings.

Alive 2 was recorded on the tour, but by January 24, 2007, the reunion had fallen through as Belladonna had reportedly chosen not to continue working with the other members.

On December 10, 2007, the group had enlisted Dan Nelson as its new lead vocalist and brought back Caggiano.

However, after recording a new album with the band, Nelson left on July 21, 2009, and was replaced for future tour dates by Bush.

On May 10, 2010, Belladonna returned to Anthrax the following year, making his first appearance at June's "big four" show and re-recording vocals on the album Worship Music.

Caggiano left the band on January 4, 2013, with Shadows Fall lead guitarist Jon Donais taking his place a week later.

== Members ==
=== Current ===
Image	Name	Years active	Instruments	Release contributions
	Scott Ian	1980–present	lead guitar (1980–1983, 1995); rhythm guitar; backing vocals (since 1986)	all Anthrax releases
	Charlie Benante	1983–present	drums; additional lead guitar (since 1989, studio only)	all Anthrax releases
	Frank Bello	1984–2004; 2005—present	bass guitar; backing vocals (since 1986)	all Anthrax releases from Armed and Dangerous (1985) onwards
	Joey Belladonna	1984–1992; 2005–2007; 2010–present	lead vocals	all Anthrax releases from Armed and Dangerous (1985) to Live Noize (1992); Live: The Island Years (1994); Alive 2 (2005); all Anthrax releases from The Big Four: Live from Sofia, Bulgaria (2010) onwards
	Jonathan Donais	2013–present	lead guitar; occasional backing vocals	Chile on Hell (2014); For All Kings (2016); Kings Among Scotland (2018); XL (2022)

=== Former ===
Image	Name	Years active	Instruments	Release contributions
	Dan Lilker	1980–1984	bass guitar; guitar (1981–1982)	Fistful of Metal (1984); Armed and Dangerous (1985) ("Soldiers of Metal" and "Howling Furies"); Among the Living (1987) (songwriting on tracks "I Am the Law" and "Imitation of Life")
	Dave Weiss	1980—1981	drums	none
	Joe Gelione	1980—1981	lead vocals	none
	John Connelly	1981	lead vocals	none
	Paul Kahn	1981	bass guitar	none
	Kenny Kushner	1981–1982	bass guitar	none
	Dirk Kennedy	1981–1982	lead vocals	none
	Jason Rosenfeld	1982	lead vocals	none
	Greg D'Angelo	1982–1983	drums	Anthrax (1983); Fistful of Metal (1984) ("Soldiers of Metal"); Armed and Dangerous (1985) ("Howling Furies")
	Greg Walls	1982–1983	guitar	Anthrax (1983)|Fistful of Metal (1984) (uncredited songwriting)
	Tommy Wise	1982	lead vocals	none
	Neil Turbin	1982–1984	lead vocals	Anthrax (1983); Fistful of Metal (1984); Armed and Dangerous (1985) (tracks "Soldiers of Metal" and "Howling Furies" only); Spreading the Disease (1985) (songwriting on "Armed and Dangerous" and "Gung-Ho" only)
	Bob Berry	1983	lead guitar	none
	Dan Spitz	1983–1995; 2005–2007	lead guitar; rhythm guitar (1983); backing vocals (since 1986, studio only	all Anthrax releases from Fistful of Metal (1984) to Sound of White Noise (1993); Alive 2 (2005)
	Matt Fallon	1984	lead vocals	Spreading the Disease (1985) (uncredited songwriting)
	John Bush	1992–2005; 2009–2010	lead vocals	all Anthrax releases from Sound of White Noise (1993) to The Greater of Two Evils (2004)
	Rob Caggiano	2001–2005; 2007–2013	lead guitar; occasional backing vocals	We've Come for You All (2003); The Greater of Two Evils (2004); The Big Four: Live from Sofia, Bulgaria (2010); Worship Music (2011); Anthems (2013)
	Dan Nelson	2007–2009	lead vocals	Worship Music (2011) (songwriting credits only)

=== Touring ===
Image	Name	Years active	Instruments	Notes
	Paul Crook	1995–2000	lead guitar; occasional backing vocals	Crook joined the band as Dan Spitz's guitar tech in 1989, he took on lead guitar duties after Spitz's departure in 1995. He played lead guitar on select tracks on Stomp 442 (1995) and Volume 8: The Threat Is Real (1998) the latter of which he co-produced. He also served as an understudy in 2022.
	Dave Sabo	2000	lead guitar; occasional backing vocals	Sabo toured with Anthrax during 2000, when regular guitarist Crook was touring with Sebastian Bach.
	Joey Vera	2004–2005; 2008; 2012	bass guitar; backing vocals	Vera toured with Anthrax after Bello's departure in 2004, and again in 2008 and 2012.
	Jason Bittner	2006; 2012	drums	Bittner first filled in for Benante on the final two shows of the "Among the Living" lineup reunion tour in January 2006 when Benante's daughter was born, and two more in February 2012. Bittner also did the entire summer 2012 Rockstar Mayhem tour and subsequent fall 2012 tour until Benante returned in October after another battle with carpal tunnel.
	Andreas Kisser	2011	rhythm guitar; backing vocals	Kisser substituted for Ian at eleven shows in July 2011, following the birth of the founding guitarist's first child.
	Gene Hoglan	2012; 2018	drums	Hoglan filled in for Benante, who was spending time with his terminally ill mother, at shows in January 2012. He filled in again in 2018 when Benante was forced to take a break from touring due to his carpal tunnel syndrome.
	Jon Dette	2012; 2013; 2015; 2017; 2018	drums	Dette has substituted for Benante on various tours between November 2012 and May 2017. Dette filled in for Benante again in 2018 when Benante was forced to take a break from touring due to his carpal tunnel syndrome.
	Derek Roddy	2023	drums	Roddy substituted for Benante in 2023 for medical reasons.
	Darby Todd	2026	drums	Todd filled in for Benante while he was touring with Pantera.
	Mike Heller	2026	drums	Heller substituted for Benante in 2026 for medical reasons.

== Lineups ==
Period	Members	Releases
1980–1981	Joe Gelione – lead vocals; Scott Ian – guitar; Dan Lilker – bass guitar; David Weiss – drums	none
July—late 1981	John Connelly – lead vocals; Scott Ian – lead guitar; Dan Lilker – rhythm guitar; Paul Kahn – bass guitar; David Weiss – drums	none
Late 1981–February 1982	Dirk Kennedy – lead vocals; Scott Ian – guitar; Dan Lilker — guitar; Kenny Kushner – bass guitar; David Weiss – drums	none
February–July 1982	Jason Rosenfeld – lead vocals; Scott Ian – guitar; Dan Lilker — guitar; Kenny Kushner – bass guitar; David Weiss – drums	none
July 1982	Tommy Wise – lead vocals; Greg Walls – guitar; Scott Ian – guitar; Dan Lilker – bass guitar; Greg D’Angelo – drums	none
August 1982–July 1983	Neil Turbin – lead vocals; Greg Walls – guitar; Scott Ian – guitar; Dan Lilker – bass guitar; Greg D’Angelo – drums	Anthrax (1983)
July–September 1983	Neil Turbin – lead vocals; Rob Berry – guitar; Scott Ian – guitar; Dan Lilker – bass guitar; Greg D’Angelo – drums	none
September 1983–January 1984	Neil Turbin – lead vocals; Dan Spitz – lead guitar; Scott Ian – rhythm guitar; Dan Lilker – bass guitar; Charlie Benante – drums	Fistful of Metal (1984)
January–August 1984	Neil Turbin – lead vocals; Dan Spitz – lead guitar; Scott Ian – rhythm guitar; Frank Bello – bass guitar; Charlie Benante – drums	none
August–November 1984	Matt Fallon – lead vocals; Dan Spitz – lead guitar; Scott Ian – rhythm guitar; Frank Bello – bass guitar; Charlie Benante – drums	none
December 1984–August 1992	Joey Belladonna — lead vocals; Dan Spitz – lead guitar, backing vocals (since 1986, studio only); Scott Ian – rhythm guitar, backing vocals (since 1986); Frank Bello – bass guitar, backing vocals (since 1986); Charlie Benante – drums	Armed and Dangerous (1985); Spreading the Disease (1985); Among the Living (1987); I'm the Man (1987); State of Euphoria (1988); Penikufesin (1989); Persistence of Time (1990); Live: The Island Years (1994); Caught in a Mosh: BBC Live in Concert (2007)
September 1992–July 1995	John Bush – lead vocals; Dan Spitz – lead guitar, occasional backing vocals; Scott Ian – rhythm guitar, backing vocals; Frank Bello – bass guitar, backing vocals; Charlie Benante – drums	Sound of White Noise (1993)
July 1995–August 2001	John Bush – lead vocals; Paul Crook - lead guitar, occasional backing vocals (touring member); Scott Ian – rhythm guitar, backing vocals; Frank Bello – bass guitar, backing vocals; Charlie Benante – drums	Stomp 442 (1995); Volume 8: The Threat Is Real (1998); Inside Out (1999)
August 2001–March 2004	John Bush – lead vocals; Rob Caggiano – lead guitar, occasional backing vocals; Scott Ian – rhythm guitar, backing vocals; Frank Bello – bass guitar, backing vocals; Charlie Benante – drums	We've Come for You All (2003); Music of Mass Destruction (2004); The Greater of Two Evils (2004)
March 2004–March 2005	John Bush – lead vocals; Rob Caggiano – lead guitar, occasional backing vocals; Scott Ian – rhythm guitar, backing vocals; Joey Vera – bass guitar, backing vocals; Charlie Benante – drums	none
March 2005–January 2007	Joey Belladonna – lead vocals; Dan Spitz – lead guitar; Scott Ian – rhythm guitar, backing vocals; Frank Bello – bass guitar, backing vocals; Charlie Benante – drums	Alive 2 (2005)
Band hiatus between January–December 2007
December 2007–July 2009	Dan Nelson – lead vocals; Rob Caggiano – lead guitar; Scott Ian – rhythm guitar, backing vocals; Frank Bello – bass guitar, backing vocals; Charlie Benante – drums	none
August 2009–May 2010	John Bush – lead vocals; Rob Caggiano – lead guitar; Scott Ian – rhythm guitar, backing vocals; Frank Bello – bass guitar, backing vocals; Charlie Benante – drums	none
May 2010–January 2013	Joey Belladonna – lead vocals; Rob Caggiano – lead guitar, occasional backing vocals; Scott Ian – rhythm guitar, backing vocals; Frank Bello – bass guitar, backing vocals; Charlie Benante – drums	The Big Four: Live from Sofia, Bulgaria (2010); Worship Music (2011); Anthems (2013)
January 2013–present	Joey Belladonna – lead vocals; Jonathan Donais – lead guitar, occasional backing vocals; Scott Ian – rhythm guitar, backing vocals; Frank Bello – bass guitar, backing vocals; Charlie Benante – drums	Chile on Hell (2014); For All Kings (2016); Kings Among Scotland (2018); XL (2022)
