= Boiler room =

Boiler room or Boiler Room may refer to:

== Arts and entertainment ==
- Boiler Room (band), a nu metal band formed in 1996
- Boiler Room (Big Day Out), a dance music venue within the former annual Australian music festival Big Day Out
- Boiler Room (film), a 2000 U.S. film
- Boiler Room (music broadcaster), a music broadcaster launched in London in 2010
- "The Boiler Room", an episode of the Tanner '88 television series

== Other uses ==
- Boiler room (building), a room or space in a building for mechanical equipment and its associated electrical equipment
- Boiler room (business), a busy centre of activity, often selling questionable goods by telephone
- Boiler room (ship), a compartment on a steamship that houses the boiler
- Boiler Room, a restaurant launched by Vivian Howard
