= Anthems (Anthrax EP) =

EP by Anthrax
- Released: March 19, 2013 (North America); March 22, 2013 (Europe)
- Recorded: 2012 at various locations
- Genres: Heavy metal, hard rock
- Length: 33:40
- Labels: Megaforce (North America); Nuclear Blast (Europe)
- Producers: Anthrax; Jay Ruston; Rob Caggiano

Anthrax chronology
Worship Music (album) (2011)	Anthems (2013)	For All Kings (2016)

Anthems is the sixth EP by American thrash metal band Anthrax. It was released on March 19, 2013 through Megaforce Records in North America, and three days later in Europe by Nuclear Blast. This was the group's last release to feature lead guitarist Rob Caggiano, who left the band subsequently. The record features cover songs from some of the band's favorite acts of the 1970s, along with two versions of "Crawl", a song from their previous studio album, Worship Music.

The EP was recorded during 2012 at various locations. Although it was initially scheduled to be released as part of a special edition of Worship Music, the record was released both separately and on a deluxe edition. It received favorable reviews by music critics and debuted at number 52 on the Billboard 200, selling approximately 8,500 copies in its first week of release. By April 10, 2013, Anthems had sold 14,000 copies in the United States, according to Nielsen Soundscan. The band's cover of "T.N.T." was nominated for the Best Metal Performance award at the 57th Annual Grammy Awards.

== Background and recording ==
Anthrax intended to release Anthems as a tribute to the bands that influenced them over the years. Vocalist Joey Belladonna explained: "These are all bands I grew up with and have listened to forever. It's just great music. I had fun singing these songs and I was happy recording together with Anthrax, doing classic rock songs." When asked how the band got the idea to do such a record, bassist Frank Bello answered: "The reason why that happened, if you ever came to an Anthrax sound check, you'd probably hear every other song but an Anthrax song." He further said that the band got the idea while jamming to some older songs. "We just wanted to say this is where we also came from. That gave us our start and that is what sparked us."

The band started working on this project in the summer of 2012. The album was recorded in 2012 at different locations: at drummer Charlie Benante's home studio, in producer Jay Ruston's New York studio and during tour. Some of the tracks were recorded earlier, during the recording sessions of their previous studio release Worship Music. Benante, in an interview for Loudwire, stated: "To commemorate the first year of Worship Music being out, we're putting together a little companion EP with some fun shit on it." The original idea was to record a few songs that would have been placed on a deluxe edition of their previous album, but the band did not manage to finish the project in time. However, when the band had recorded enough songs, they contacted their US and European labels who offered to put out Anthems as a stand-alone EP, a proposal which the band accepted. In addition, Benante and artist Stephen Thompson have redesigned each track's original artwork to "Anthrax" it.

== Composition ==
Anthems is an eight-track EP which contains cover songs from classic 1970s rock bands that influenced Anthrax. Apart from the six cover tracks, the album features a studio version and a remix of "Crawl", a song from their previous album Worship Music. The first single released from the EP was the cover of Rush's "Anthem", which garnered positive reaction from music critics. Graham Hartmann from Loudwire called the cover version "unique, as Anthrax throw their trademark thrash spin on the prog classic". The second song released from the record was "Smokin'" from Boston, which prominently features session keyboardist Fred Mandel. Drummer Charlie Benante explained the selection of the Boston song by saying: "One of the great things about "Smokin'" is that there's a really cool section that has a real "Anthrax-y" feel to it, the guitars and drums and playing the same type of rhythm, the kick drums are going with the guitars – I immediately heard in my head what we could do with it."

== Reception ==
Professional ratings
Review scores
Source	Rating
About.com	3.5/5 stars
AllMusic	2.5/5 stars
Exclaim!	7/10
Metal Forces	8/10
PopMatters	6/10
Revolver	3.5/5

The EP received favorable reviews by music critics. AllMusic reviewer Jason Lymangrover gave the album two-and-a-half stars, saying the tracks are "meticulously executed in the fun, dumb spirit that most Anthrax fans will love". Chad Bowar from About.com named the album "certainly not essential", but assumed that the fans of the band will enjoy it. In a review for Metal Forces, Jim McDonald felt that the songs on Anthems were "perfect covers" with "superb melodies". Aside from "Jailbreak", which he pointed as the "sole low point", McDonald went on to say "all in all, Anthems is an interesting diversion while fans wait for the next album". Kory Grow from Revolver also made positive comments on the record, saying that Belladonna's voice "perfectly" fits the covers. Writing in PopMatters, reviewer J.C. Maçek stated that Anthrax delivered "the most accurate cover songs they possibly can". However, he noted that the band was "too careful" on this record, adding "nothing new" to it. Chris Ayers of Exclaim! was more enthusiastic towards the album, labeling it a "metal milestone" in Anthrax's "storied career".

The album sold 8,500 copies in its first week of release to debut at number 52 on the Billboard 200 chart. Another 3,500 copies were sold in the second week, with the EP falling to number 142. By April 10, 2013, Anthems had sold about 14,000 copies in the United States, according to Nielsen Soundscan.

== Track listing ==
No.	Title	Writer(s)	Length
1.	"Anthem" (Rush cover)	Geddy Lee, Alex Lifeson, Neil Peart	4:37
2.	"T.N.T." (AC/DC cover)	Angus Young, Malcolm Young, Bon Scott	3:37
3.	"Smokin'" (Boston cover)	Brad Delp, Tom Scholz	4:20
4.	"Keep On Runnin'" (Journey cover)	Jonathan Cain, Steve Perry, Neal Schon	3:42
5.	"Big Eyes" (Cheap Trick cover)	Rick Nielsen	3:16
6.	"Jailbreak" (Thin Lizzy cover)	Phil Lynott	4:06
7.	"Crawl" (album version)	Anthrax	5:00
8.	"Crawl" (Orc mix)	Anthrax	5:02
Total length:			33:40

== Personnel ==
Credits are adapted from AllMusic.

Anthrax

- Joey Belladonna – lead vocals
- Scott Ian – rhythm guitar, backing vocals
- Frank Bello – bass, backing vocals
- Charlie Benante – drums
- Rob Caggiano – lead guitar

Additional musicians

- Fred Mandel – keyboards on "Smokin'"
- Phil Campbell – lead guitar on "Jailbreak"
- Dan Nelson – co-author on "Crawl"

Technical personnel

- Jay Ruston – producer, engineer, mixing
- Paul Logus – mastering
- Michael Lord – orchestration
- Douglas Heusser – graphic design
- Stephen Thompson – artwork

== Charts ==
Chart (2013)	Peak position
UK Rock & Metal Albums (Official Charts)	30
US Billboard 200	52
US Independent Albums (Billboard)	10
US Top Hard Rock Albums (Billboard)	4
US Top Rock Albums (Billboard)	18
US Indie Store Album Sales (Billboard)	11

== Release history ==
Region	Date	Label
North America	March 19, 2013	Megaforce Records
Europe	March 22, 2013	Nuclear Blast
