= Music of Mass Destruction =

Live album by Anthrax
- Released: April 20, 2004
- Recorded: December 5–6, 2003
- Venues: Metro (Chicago, IL)
- Genres: Heavy metal, thrash metal, groove metal
- Length: 61:49 (CD); 90:06 (DVD)
- Label: Sanctuary
- Producer: Anthrax

Anthrax chronology
We've Come for You All (2003)	Music of Mass Destruction (2004)	The Greater of Two Evils (2004)

Anthrax video chronology
Return of the Killer A's: Video Collection (1999)	Music of Mass Destruction (2004)	Rock Legends (2005)

Music of Mass Destruction is Anthrax's second full-length live album, and is packaged as one CD and one DVD. The songs were recorded on December 5 and 6, 2003, during performances at Chicago's Metro.

Cover art for the album was done by famous comic artist Alex Ross.

Professional ratings
Review scores
Source	Rating
AllMusic	4/5 stars
Encyclopedia of Popular Music	3/5 stars

== Track listing ==
=== Disc 1 (CD) ===
1. "What Doesn't Die" – 5:27
2. "Got the Time" – 3:25
3. "Caught in a Mosh" – 5:28
4. "Safe Home" – 5:37
5. "Room for One More" – 5:53
6. "Antisocial" – 4:51
7. "Nobody Knows Anything" – 4:04
8. "Fueled" – 4:26
9. "Inside Out" – 5:47
10. "Refuse to be Denied" – 5:11
11. "I Am the Law" – 6:10
12. "Only" – 5:28

=== Disc 2 (DVD) ===
1. "What Doesn't Die" – 4:37
2. "Got the Time" – 3:18
3. "Caught in a Mosh" – 5:28
4. "Safe Home" – 5:36
5. "Room for One More" – 5:53
6. "Antisocial" – 4:51
7. "Nobody Knows Anything" – 4:04
8. "Belly of the Beast" – 4:26
9. "Inside Out" – 5:47
10. "Refuse to Be Denied" – 5:07
11. "604" – 0:35
12. "I Am the Law" – 6:09
13. "Only" – 5:28
14. "Be All, End All" – 7:10
15. "Indians" – 7:39
16. "Bring the Noise" (with extract of Metallica's "Whiplash") – 7:11

=== Bonus tracks ===
17. "Fueled" – 4:32
18. "Metal Thrashing Mad" (Neil Turbin, Scott Ian, Lilker) – 2:50

== Personnel ==
- John Bush – lead vocals
- Rob Caggiano – lead guitar
- Scott Ian – rhythm guitar, backing vocals
- Frank Bello – bass, backing vocals
- Charlie Benante – drums

== Charts ==
Chart (2004)	Peak position
German Albums (Offizielle Top 100)	88
