= Boiler Room (band) =

American nu metal band

- Boiler Room in 2000 (left to right: James Meselsohn, Rob Caggiano, Chris Lino, Mike Meselsohn)

Background information
- Origin: New York City, U.S.
- Genres: Nu metal; alternative metal
- Years active: 1996–2001; 2023–present
- Labels: Roadrunner; Tommy Boy
- Members: Chris Lino; Mike Orlando; Jeff Thal
- Past members: Rob Caggiano; James Meselsohn; Mike Meselsohn; Joe Barracato

Boiler Room is an American nu metal band from New York City. The band formed in 1996, releasing two studio albums and one single before disbanding in 2001.

In 2021, lead vocalist Chris Lino announced he would be reforming the band with a new lineup. Shortly after it was announced that several songs from the band's two official releases would be re-recorded along with new music. Recording commenced in 2023.

== Career ==
=== Early years and Boiler Room (1993–1997) ===
The beginnings of the band can be traced back to the early 1990s. Vocalist Chris Lino, guitarist Joey Barracato, bassist James Meselsohn and drummer Mike Meselsohn played together in the thrash metal band Bible Black, producing demos in 1993 and 1994 before independently releasing an EP entitled Wreckage in 1995.

Unable to secure a record deal, the band ultimately dissolved before the members reconvened in 1996 as Boiler Room.

The newly christened band toured through their local club scene for several years, building up their material and performance skills.

The same year, they independently released their debut album, the self-titled Boiler Room (often mistakenly referred to as Low Society), with at least seven of the album’s 11 tracks being re-worked songs from their Bible Black days in Do or Die, Independence, Undying, Wrecking Man, Hard Reality, Black Sky and Judgement Day.

The album, produced by future Guns N' Roses guitarist Ron “Bumblefoot” Thal, featured a sound more influenced by hardcore and groove metal when compared to their later work. Drummer Mike Meselsohn would later collaborate with Thal again on the latter's 1997 album Hermit, contributing drums to three tracks. Sometime after the release of Boiler Room, Joey Barracato was replaced by Rob Caggiano.

=== Record label changes and Can't Breathe (1999–2001) ===
1999 saw the band opening for nationally-recognized acts, including Type O Negative, King's X, Clutch and Static-X, helping them catch the attention of local radio station WXRK. With their music in heavy rotation on the station, they eventually landed them the opening slot of a KROCK-sponsored show, headlined by Orgy.

The next year, Boiler Room signed to Roadrunner Records and immediately set to work recording their album Can't Breathe with producer John Travis at the helm and additional instrumental interludes provided by famed producer Eddie Wohl.

During the production process, famed producer Bob Marlette was given the opportunity to provide a test mix for the song Do It Again, but it was ultimately rejected. In a bizarre twist of events, Marlette’s mix of the song accidentally found its way onto the same computer folders where he was saving his mixes for another Roadrunner-signed band named Downer, causing a brief period of confusion amongst executives at Roadrunner Records.

Upon completion of the album, the song Do It Again found its way onto an MTV compilation disc titled Return of the Rock, released on June 13, 2000.

After the album's release date was pushed back several times, the band asked to be let go from their contract with Roadrunner. The label agreed to release the band and gave permissions for them to shop the finished record to other labels. Eventually, the band found a new home at Tommy Boy Records. With new artwork created, Can't Breathe finally hit stores on November 3, 2000, with the opening track Do It Again being sent to radio stations and released as a single, with the unreleased song 4 x 4 accompanying it as a b-side.

Critically, the album was met with little enthusiasm, with Dean Carlson from AllMusic describing the band's sound as "clichéd musicianship" in a negative review that scored 1.5 stars out of 5. However, the tracks Do It Again, Patience and Hopeless were chosen as AMG track picks.

The band subsequently promoted the album with both a national and European tour, including a string of dates in the UK with Lostprophets before finishing with a few club dates in Germany in early March. Upon returning the US on March 12, 2001, Boiler Room played a few extra club dates on the east coast before announcing Superficial as the upcoming second single from the album, along with plans to film a video. However, news from the band immediately ceased before announcing on 14 June, 2001 that Tommy Boy Records had dropped them from their roster.

=== Breakup and post-Boiler Room (2001–2021) ===
After five years and two record labels, the band decided to call it quits and move onto separate projects. In August 2001, guitarist Rob Caggiano was announced as the new lead guitarist for Anthrax, where he would play until his departure in 2005. He returned to the lineup in 2007, only to depart again in 2013 in order to join Volbeat.

In early 2003 it was reported that vocalist Chris Lino was singing in a new band called Out of Body and shopping around a five-track demo. The lineup for Out of Body notably featured future Adrenaline Mob and Noturnall guitarist Mike Orlando. No reports of the band have been announced since 2003.

In 2008, drummer Mike Meselsohn helped form the band Black Water Rising and has appeared on all their releases.

=== New music and re-recording Can't Breathe (2021–present) ===
In 2021, a YouTube user claiming to be Chris Lino announced his intentions to re-record and re-release the Can't Breathe album, along with five new songs, with the help of Adrenaline Mob guitarist Mike Orlando, who previously worked with Lino in Out of Body. Orlando is slated to handle guitar and production duties. Lino also hinted at potentially re-recording material from the self-titled album.

In early-2023, Lino announced via the same YouTube account that drum tracks had been recorded at Sonic Stomp Studios with former Bumblefoot, and brother of Ron "Bumblefoot" Thal, Jeff Thal performing drum duties and Mike Orlando handling production.

Later in 2023, Lino provided an additional update to announce that guitars and vocals were in the process of being recorded. He is the only original member involved in the recordings.

== Lineup ==
=== Current members ===
- Chris Lino – vocals (1996–2001, 2023-present)
- Mike Orlando – guitars (2023-present)
- Jeff Thal – drums (2023-present)

=== Past members ===
- James Meselsohn – bass (1996–2001)
- Mike Meselsohn – drums (1996–2001)
- Joey Barracato – guitars (1996–1998)
- Rob Caggiano – guitars (1998–2001)

== Discography ==
- Boiler Room (1996), DIY Records
- Can't Breathe (2000), Roadrunner / Tommy Boy
- "Do It Again" (single) (2001), Roadrunner / Tommy Boy
- Rectify (2025), Deko Entertainment
