= We've Come for You All =

Studio album by Anthrax
- Released: May 6, 2003
- Recorded: 2001–2002
- Studio: BearTracks Recording Studio in Suffern, New York
- Genres: Groove metal; alternative metal; thrash metal
- Length: 50:03
- Labels: Sanctuary; Nuclear Blast
- Producers: Anthrax; Scrap 60

Anthrax chronology
Madhouse: The Very Best of Anthrax (2001)	We've Come for You All (2003)	Music of Mass Destruction (2004)

Anthrax studio chronology
Volume 8: The Threat Is Real (1998)	We've Come for You All (2003)	Worship Music (2011)

Singles from We've Come for You All
- 1. "Taking the Music Back" Released: September 3, 2003; 2. "Safe Home" Released: January 27, 2004; 3. "What Doesn't Die" Released: 2004

We've Come for You All is the ninth studio album by American heavy metal band Anthrax. It was released on May 6, 2003 through Nuclear Blast in Europe and Sanctuary Records in North America. This was the first Anthrax record to feature Rob Caggiano on lead guitar and their last studio album with John Bush on vocals. The album was recorded over a one-year span at the BearTracks Recording Studio in Suffern, New York. The cover art was designed by comic book artist Alex Ross, while the production was handled by Scrap 60 Productions team. The Who vocalist Roger Daltrey and Pantera guitarist Dimebag Darrell made guest appearances on the album.

The album received positive reviews by contemporary music critics, with About.com crediting it for "getting the band back on track". Despite this, the album only reached number 122 on the Billboard 200, with first week sales of 10,000 copies. To date, We've Come for You All has sold over 62,000 copies in the United States. It was nominated for Outstanding Hard Rock Album at the 2004 California Music Awards, but lost to Blink 182's untitled album.

== Background and recording ==
This album followed Volume 8: The Threat Is Real, which was released in 1998. Anthrax decided to sign with record label Nuclear Blast for the release of their upcoming album. Asked if changing the record company will affect the songwriting, guitarist Scott Ian replied: "To be honest, I don't care about that at all. You know, business is business and the creative side is the creative side. Creatively, there was no big challenge. We just wanted to try to make the best record we can."

The band started writing new material during the months of May and June 2001, and entered the studio in November the same year. The recording process was shortly interrupted because the band went on a tour with Judas Priest early in 2002. They returned to the studio in March and in the next few months worked on the record and successfully finished it. According to Ian, the whole process of making the album took the band a year. Ian also said that there is no leftover material out of the recording sessions, except for the song "Ghost", which was released as a B-side on the single "Taking the Music Back". The Who vocalist Roger Daltrey and Pantera guitarist Dimebag Darrell made guest appearances on the album, as well as E-Town Concrete vocalist Anthony Martini. Daltrey was featured in the song "Taking the Music Back", Martini provided vocals on “Refuse to be Denied”, while Darrell contributed to the songs "Cadillac Rock Box" and "Strap It On". The band explained their appearances by saying they "felt the need to invite some friends to make something special for the album and the result is simply fantastic."

The album was produced by Scrap 60 Productions team, consisted of Anthrax guitarist Rob Caggiano, Eddie Wohl, and Steve Regina. The front cover was designed by comic book artist Alex Ross. Vocalist John Bush stated that the band was honored to work with Ross, who also did the artwork for their previous pair of recordings. Bush explained that the band gave Ross a complete freedom over the concept of the artwork. Apart from suggesting the album's title as an idea, Bush said that the other members had not participated much in creating the cover art.

== Release ==
The release date of the album was delayed several times. The album was originally set for a release on February 4, 2003 in Europe and Japan, and on February 24 in the US and Canada. After the prolongation of the release date for territories outside Japan and Europe, drummer Charlie Benante posted an explanation on the band's official website: "I hate to tell you this but ... the record got pushed back to April 15. It's only been 73 years since Vol. 8 [was released], what's another week or two? The record company needed the extra time to put more time into the promotion. One day all this crap will be over, you'll be rocking out to some killer shit." It was later announced that the release date for Europe would be also pushed back to March 3, 2003, eventually setting it on May 6. The problems occurred after a breakdown in negotiations between Beyond Records and Sanctuary Records over a buy-out of the band's contract. According to Blabbermouth, Beyond Records was in the process of selling their entire catalog to Sanctuary, but the arrangement had fallen through. However, the problems were resolved and the record was successfully distributed through Sanctuary in North America and Nuclear Blast in Europe.

The album debuted at No. 122 on the Billboard 200 chart with first week sales of just under 10,000 units. Since its release in May 2003, We've Come for You All sold about 62,000 copies in the United States. Apart from entering the French Albums Chart at number 95, the record did not manage to chart in any other country. Referring to the low record sales, Ian posted a message on the band's official web site saying: "That's more than I thought it would do after five years away. That's basically what [the group's last album] Volume 8 did in its first week and this one was based on mostly just Internet promo."

== Composition ==
Bush opined that We've Come for You All was reminiscent of his previous releases with the band. "It's still an Anthrax album with many different parts that can appeal to a wide audience. Our sound is recognizable each time you listen to one of our songs and that's something we really want for our music. You have the fastest rhythms, the more danceable ones, you have everything you can expect from an Anthrax record." Benante said that elements from their earlier albums are still present on the record, though it explores "other territories". For example, he revealed that the song "Cadillac Rock Box" was influenced by both Lynyrd Skynyrd and 1976—1977 era Kiss.

Critics have described We've Come for You All as similar to Anthrax's previous four albums, featuring groove metal, alternative metal and harsh vocals from Bush. However, it also introduces what Johnny Loftus from AllMusic calls "a volatile mix of thrash and conventional metal" that the band explored more on their following albums. He noted the record for using modern production techniques, as well as displaying melodies and instrumentation that have always been Anthrax's trademark. Rock Hard observed that the record was a combination of "tradition and modernity", with strong vocals and "thrashy" tunes. They pointed that the sound was extremely complex with "super fat" production, having nothing similar with the nu metal sound of the early 2000s. Exclaim! wrote that the songs had rock-based structures, unlike the band's earlier releases which featured "brutal beats and razor riffs". Gregory Bradley also noted that a couple of songs had "distinct hard-rock vibe", while others demonstrated "very metal" sound. In their guide to Anthrax discography, Kerrang! wrote that We've Come for You All was "leaning towards a groove-orientated hard rock sound" with several slower and radio friendly efforts.

== Critical reception ==
Professional ratings
Review scores
Source	Rating
AllMusic	4/5 stars
Collector's Guide to Heavy Metal	7/10
Encyclopedia of Popular Music	3/5 stars
Metal Review	6.9/10
NOW Magazine	3/5 stars
Rock Hard	9/10
RTÉ Ten	4/5 stars

We've Come for You All received positive reviews upon release, with About.com crediting it for "getting the band back on track". AllMusic's Johnny Loftus noted the album for its "pile-driving thrash" sound, which reminded him of the group's earlier days. Loftus concluded that We've Come for You All was the definitive thrash metal album, released in a period when albums from that genre were not common. In a review for Raidió Teilifís Éireann, Harry Guerin wrote that the band has preserved their sense of melody and aggression. He praised the fast blast beat percussion on "Black Dahlia", and finished the review by saying that the album would likely exceed the expectations of their most devoted fans.

Writing for Metal Review, Gregory Bradley stopped short of calling the album a return to form, but asserted that the record was an "acceptable" release. Bradley did, however, credit the album for having some "very metal" songs, singling out "What Doesn't Die" and "Black Dahlia" in particular. Chris Ayers from Exclaim! opined that We've Come for You All was the band's strongest release since Sound of White Noise (1993) and easily the best of the John Bush era: "Grittier and more confident, the self-produced We've Come for You All is a certified classic that proves the ageless Anthrax are still a viable metal option." Vik Bansal, of MusicOMH, summarized the album as "a bold, sleek and raucous slab of modern metal", containing elements that were absent from many heavy metal albums at the time. Bansal cited "What Doesn't Die" for particular praise, noting the "razor-sharp" riffs on the song. He noted "Cadillac Rock Box" for sounding similar to bands like Lynyrd Skynyrd and Black Sabbath. Bansal summed up his review by stating that We've Come for You All is a "mighty album from a still mighty band".

== Track listing ==
All tracks are written by Charlie Benante, Scott Ian, Frank Bello, and John Bush.

No.	Title	Length
1.	"Contact"	1:15
2.	"What Doesn't Die"	4:10
3.	"Superhero"	4:03
4.	"Refuse to Be Denied"	3:20
5.	"Safe Home"	5:10
6.	"Any Place but Here"	5:49
7.	"Nobody Knows Anything"	2:57
8.	"Strap It On" (featuring Dimebag Darrell)	3:32
9.	"Black Dahlia"	2:37
10.	"Cadillac Rock Box" (featuring Dimebag Darrell)	3:41
11.	"Taking the Music Back" (featuring Roger Daltrey)	3:11
12.	"Crash"	0:57
13.	"Think About an End"	5:09
14.	"W.C.F.Y.A."	4:12
Total length:		50:03

Bonus tracks
No.	Title	Writer(s)	Length
15.	"Safe Home (Acoustic)"		5:54
16.	"We're a Happy Family" (Ramones cover, hidden track starts at 3:59)	Joey Ramone	5:17
Total length:			61:14

== Personnel ==
All personnel credits for We've Come for You All are adapted from the album's liner notes.

Anthrax

- Charlie Benante – drums, guitars, acoustic guitar and occasional noises; lead guitar (3, 13); first lead guitar (5, 10); lead guitar harmony (6); slide guitar (10); mixing; cover concept and art direction
- Scott Ian – rhythm guitar, backing vocals and frequent noises;
- Frank Bello – bass, backing vocals; lead vocals (12)
- John Bush – lead vocals
- Rob Caggiano – lead guitar (1, 2, 4, 5, 7, 9, 11, 12, 14); rhythm guitar (3, 6, 8, 10, 13); occasional noises; production, mixing

Guest musicians

- Dimebag Darrell – lead guitar on (8, 10)
- Anthony Martini – screamed vocals (4)
- Roger Daltrey – additional vocals (11)

Technical personnel

- Anthrax – production
- Steve Regina – production, mixing
- Eddie Wohl – production, mixing
- J.P. Sheganoski - assistant engineer
- Paul Crook – assistant engineer
- Anthony Ruotolo – assistant engineer
- George Marino – mastering

Creative

- Alex Ross – cover printing and cover concept
- Brent Thompson – art direction, graphic design and illustrations
- Andy Buchanan – all band photos
- Ylana Glickman – tray illustration from photo
- Luke M. Wilson – "Safe Home" illustration

== Charts ==
Chart (2003)	Peak position
French Albums (SNEP)	95
German Albums (Offizielle Top 100)	22
Japanese Albums (Oricon)	45
Scottish Albums (Official Charts)	78
UK Independent Albums (Official Charts)	7
UK Rock & Metal Albums (Official Charts)	10
US Billboard 200	122

== Release history ==
Region	Date	Label
North America	May 6, 2003	Sanctuary Records
Europe	May 6, 2003	Nuclear Blast
