= Worship Music (album) =

Studio album by Anthrax
- Released: September 12, 2011
- Recorded: 2008–2011
- Genres: Thrash metal; heavy metal; groove metal
- Length: 65:43
- Labels: Megaforce; Nuclear Blast
- Producers: Rob Caggiano; Jay Ruston

Anthrax chronology
| The Big Four: Live from Sofia, Bulgaria (2010) | Worship Music (2011) | Anthems (2013) |

Anthrax studio chronology
| We've Come for You All (2003) | Worship Music (2011) | For All Kings (2016) |

Singles from Worship Music
- 1. "Fight 'Em 'Til You Can't" Released: June 24, 2011; 2. "The Devil You Know" Released: August 9, 2011; 3. "In the End" Released: November 17, 2011; 4. "I'm Alive" Released: January 4, 2012

Deluxe edition

Worship Music is the tenth studio album by American heavy metal band Anthrax. The album was released on September 12, 2011, internationally, and on September 13 in the United States. It was the band's first album of original material since 2003's We've Come for You All, the first full-length Anthrax album since the return of longtime vocalist Joey Belladonna, and the final album with guitarist Rob Caggiano prior to his departure in January 2013.

The album's creation was a lengthy process, with work beginning as early as November 2008. The album was delayed due to issues with the departure of vocalist Dan Nelson, and for a short period of time the re-joining of John Bush who ultimately decided not to commit to the album. The band eventually reunited with Belladonna, and finished recording in April 2011. Worship Music was positively received upon release, with critics describing it as "fresh and eruptive as ever" and qualified it as a return to form for the band. The record debuted at number 12 in the United States, their highest chart position since 1993's Sound of White Noise.

== Background ==
Slipknot singer Corey Taylor was approached to join the band in 2007 and began working with drummer Charlie Benante and writing lyrics for the new album. However, Slipknot's record label, Roadrunner Records, prevented him from working further, as they were expecting Slipknot to record a new album, All Hope Is Gone.

In the December 2008 edition of his monthly SuicideGirls column, Food Coma, guitarist Scott Ian revealed that he had been in the studio working on the new Anthrax album since November 4. Ian went on to say that drums, bass, and rhythm guitar had been arranged for 19 tracks, and that the process of recording the vocals had begun. "We should be mixing at the end of January and soon after that giving birth to a really pissed off, loud, fast and heavy child." In a subsequent May 2009 Food Coma column, Ian announced that the album was being mixed by Dave Fortman, whose previous credits include albums by Evanescence and Slipknot.

The album was scheduled to feature Dan Nelson on vocals. However, following the events later that year, he was no longer a member of the band. When asked what would happen to the completed studio album featuring Nelson's vocals, Ian said: "Until we have a new singer, I can't tell you what will happen to the record. We'll probably change a few things on it, including the vocals." Ian also indicated that the album's release could be delayed until 2010. It was assumed that John Bush was going to record new vocals for the album after his reunion with the band. However, this did not happen. In an interview at the time, Bush said he was trying to re-record vocals for some of the songs that had already been recorded.

Bush eventually decided that he did not want to recommit to Anthrax full-time and left the group. As a result, the band reunited with Joey Belladonna. Following shows during the summer and fall of 2010, the band returned to the studio. Some of the completed songs were left as is, adding Belladonna's vocals, others were re–written, and some entirely new songs were composed with Belladonna. Benante suggested the album's title after the eponymous TV show. Although Ian stated that the album name could be changed, this turned out not to be the case. In October 2010 at Nassau Coliseum, Anthrax performed the song "Fight 'Em 'Til You Can't" for the first time with Belladonna. It was at this point that Ian said fans should expect the new record in late 2011.

In December, Ian stated that the band had almost completed the new album and only had to re-record two or three tracks. Ian further confirmed that all the material would feature vocals by Belladonna. Noisecreep reported that Worship Music had been shelved until Belladonna completed new vocal tracks. The band finished recording Worship Music in April 2011, and called it their "most emotional album". "Fight 'Em 'Til You Can't" was released as the lead single on June 24, 2011. It was released for free download as a way of saying "thank you" to fans' loyalty in waiting in anticipation for the album. Three days later, Ian announced that the band had started the mastering process for the upcoming album. The cover art was revealed the following month.

== Lyrics ==
The songs "Earth on Hell" and "Revolution Screams" refer to democracy in the United States and around the world. According to Ian, at the time of the album's release, these songs were "very much about people taking the power back". Although the songs were written long before, he cited the 2011 Egyptian revolution and Occupy Wall Street demonstrations as examples of this phenomenon coming to pass. "The Devil You Know", despite the line "Let the right one in" and the band's history of using horror stories as subject matter, was not a reference to the 2004 Swedish vampire novel Let the Right One In; it was about World War II veterans. "Fight 'Em 'Til You Can't" is about a zombie apocalypse, and "In the End" was written as a tribute to the late Ronnie James Dio, an inspiration for the band, and Dimebag Darrell, a friend and collaborator on three Anthrax albums. "Judas Priest" was named as a tribute to the heavy metal band Judas Priest, and contains a bridge that references several well-known Priest songs. "The Constant" is about the episode of the 2004 television series Lost of the same name, where a character travels through time until he finds his "constant".

"I'm Alive" was written when Dan Nelson was member of the band. Anthrax premiered the song live in 2008, though it was titled "Vampires" at that time. It is notable for its tribal-sounding introduction with clean guitars backed up by a marching drum beat, before taking off into a heavy riff and gradually breaking into a melodic chorus. In an album preview by Blabbermouth.net, "I'm Alive" was described as "beautiful and grand with a build that demands audience participation". The song was nominated for a Grammy Award in the category Best Hard Rock/Metal Performance, the band's fourth Grammy nomination.

== Release ==
Worship Music was internationally released on September 12, 2011, and on September 13 in the United States. It sold 28,000 copies in the United States in its first week of release and debuted at number 12 on the Billboard 200, the third highest position of their career (the second being its successor, For All Kings, which charted at number 9) and the highest since Sound of White Noise (1993), which peaked at number 7. The band's previous studio album, We've Come for You All (2003), opened with just under 10,000 units to debut at number 122. The album charted at number 13 in Germany and managed to break into the top 10 in Finland, reaching number 6. By September 2012, Worship Music sold about 100,000 copies in the United States.

When asked about a possible follow-up to Worship Music, bassist Frank Bello said that the band intended to re-release Worship Music with several bonus tracks. The bonus tracks were set to include covers of Rush and Boston songs. Bello stated that the plan was to release the reissue in the fall of 2012. A few days later, band members announced that five covers were included: "Anthem" by Rush, "Smokin'" by Boston, "Neon Knights" by Black Sabbath, "T.N.T." by AC/DC, and "Keep on Runnin'" by Journey. Although Scott Ian expected the reissue to be released by the end of the year, it was eventually postponed for 2013. The special edition of Worship Music was released on March 22, 2013, by Nuclear Blast. It consists of the original album and a bonus EP of cover songs, Anthems, which was also released separately on the same day in Europe, and three days earlier in North America.

== Reception ==
Professional ratings
Aggregate scores
| Source | Rating |
|---|---|
| Metacritic | 75/100 |
Review scores
| Source | Rating |
| AllMusic | 3.5/5 stars |
| The A.V. Club | B |
| The Boston Phoenix | 3.5/4 stars |
| Classic Rock | 8/10 |
| IGN | 8.5/10 |
| Kerrang! | 3/5 stars |
| Los Angeles Times | 2.5/4 stars |
| Loudwire | 4.5/5 stars |
| Metal Forces | 7/10 |
| PopMatters | 7/10 |

According to the review aggregator Metacritic, Worship Music received "generally favorable reviews" based on a weighted average score of 75 out of 100 from 8 critic scores. AllMusic's Greg Prato noted that in spite of the issues surrounding the departure of Dan Nelson, the album fits together "seamlessly" and called it the group's finest studio recording since Persistence of Time (1990). Jason Heller of The A.V. Club praised the album for being rid of the "nü-metal stench" of the previous record and the "all-around patchiness" from the other John Bush-era albums. Heller noted that it brought the band back into the "youthful dynamic". Classic Rock journalist Malcolm Dome observed that musically, Worship Music is a mixture of "the grinding power" of We've Come for You All and the more "clear-cut melodic approach" of Among the Living (1987), resulting in an album that is "violently metallic yet sophisticated".

Michael Christopher of The Boston Phoenix commented that Anthrax has learned from its past mistakes in making the album. He observed that the humor that characterized the previous albums was still present, and called this album a "fresh fistful of metal". Mikael Wood of the Los Angeles Times compared Worship Music to Metallica's Lulu, saying that Anthrax, unlike Metallica, opted to "reclaim ground" dominated by younger bands. Mark Fisher, writing in Metal Forces, highlighted the guitar performance, saying it reminded him of the sound Anthrax is mostly associated with. Although Fisher preferred the albums with John Bush on vocals, he remarked that Worship Music is a fine recording with a career-defining performance by Joey Belladonna. Chad Bowar from About.com also praised Belladonna's performance, noting that the vocal delivery was filled with angst and emotion. He opined that Anthrax sounded rejuvenated and qualified the album as a return to form.

Chad Grischow of IGN commented that the album sounded "as fresh and eruptive as ever" with the exception of "Crawl", the "rare misstep on the otherwise fantastic album". Loudwire's Matthew Wilkening said that Belladonna's 20-year absence from the band has not affected the band's chemistry at all. According to him, the album represented the maturity and musical growth of the band. PopMatters's Chris Colgan described the music as a combination of the "later material with shades of their thrash beginnings". He believes this wasn't "the glorious comeback" for Anthrax, but called it a solid album with signs of progress for the group.

=== Accolades ===
| Publication | Accolade | Rank |
|---|---|---|
| Loudwire | Top 10 Metal Albums of 2011 | 1 |
| Metal Rules | The Top 20 Heavy Metal Albums of 2011 | 1 |
| Spin | 20 Metal Albums of 2011 | 7 |

== Touring ==
Anthrax spent the following two years touring in support of Worship Music. The band started the tour with the "big four" shows alongside Metallica, Slayer, and Megadeth, which took place in the summer of 2011. Due to the birth of his child, Ian missed the European leg of the tour; Sepultura guitarist Andreas Kisser acted as a fill-in. Ian was able to make an appearance in Milan, Italy, joining the band and Kisser for half of the setlist. Anthrax continued touring in late 2011. In October and November, Anthrax embarked on a 23 date US tour co-headlining with Testament and openers Death Angel. These three bands resumed performing together in early 2012. The trio announced further dates in the US and Canada in the fall of 2012, with Testament promoting their then-new album, Dark Roots of Earth. Anthrax teamed up with Motörhead for a ten show UK tour in November. In January 2013, it was announced that Caggiano had left the band. He was replaced by Shadows Fall guitarist Jonathan Donais.

Anthrax was announced as the headliner for the third annual Metal Alliance US tour, which endured through March and April 2013. Supporting acts included Exodus, Municipal Waste, and Holy Grail, with the headliner Anthrax performing Among the Living in its entirety. Charlie Benante has been taking time off from gigs outside the US because of personal reasons. His place was filled in by drummer Jon Dette during these shows. The group filmed their performance at Santiago, Chile, with Benante on drums, for the DVD album Chile On Hell. The tour ended with a show at San Bernardino, California, at the second anniversary of the album's release. After finishing the tour, the band took a short break before reconvening to start work on a new album.

== Track listing ==
All songs written by Charlie Benante, Scott Ian, Frank Bello, and Joey Belladonna, except where noted.

| No. | Title | Writer(s) | Length |
|---|---|---|---|
| 1. | "Worship" (instrumental) | | 1:40 |
| 2. | "Earth on Hell" | Benante, Ian, Bello, Belladonna, Dan Nelson | 3:10 |
| 3. | "The Devil You Know" | Benante, Ian, Bello, Belladonna, Nelson | 4:46 |
| 4. | "Fight 'Em 'Til You Can't" | Benante, Ian, Bello, Belladonna, Nelson | 5:48 |
| 5. | "I'm Alive" | Benante, Ian, Bello, Belladonna, Nelson | 5:36 |
| 6. | "Hymn 1" (instrumental; unlisted) | | 0:38 |
| 7. | "In the End" | | 6:48 |
| 8. | "The Giant" | Benante, Ian, Bello, Belladonna, Nelson | 3:46 |
| 9. | "Hymn 2" (instrumental; unlisted) | | 0:44 |
| 10. | "Judas Priest" | | 6:24 |
| 11. | "Crawl" | Benante, Ian, Bello, Belladonna, Nelson | 5:28 |
| 12. | "The Constant" | Benante, Ian, Bello, Belladonna, Nelson | 5:01 |
| 13. | "Revolution Screams" | Benante, Ian, Bello, Belladonna, Nelson | 15:54 (Note: ends at 6:08; the hidden track "New Noise" begins at 11:08 after 5 minutes of silence. "New Noise" is a Refused cover.) |
| Total length: | | | 65:43 |

Japanese edition additional track
| No. | Title | Writer(s) | Length |
|---|---|---|---|
| 14. | "Crawl (Orc Mix)" | Benante, Ian, Bello, Belladonna, Nelson | 5:02 |
| Total length: | | | 70:45 |

== Personnel ==
Credits taken from Worship Music CD booklet.

Anthrax

- Charlie Benante – drums, acoustic and electric; cover concept
- Scott Ian – guitar, backing vocals
- Joey Belladonna – vocals
- Frank Bello – bass, backing vocals
- Rob Caggiano – guitar; production

Additional musicians

- Alison Chesley – cello

Technical personnel

- Anthrax – production
- Jay Ruston – mixing & additional production
- Asim Ali – engineering
- Andy Lagis – assistant engineer
- Alex Ross – album art
- Douglas Heusser – design, additional art
- Ross Halfin – photos

== Charts ==
| Chart (2011) | Peak position |
|---|---|
| Australian Albums (ARIA) | 35 |
| Austrian Albums (Ö3 Austria) | 30 |
| Belgian Albums (Ultratop Flanders) | 65 |
| Belgian Albums (Ultratop Wallonia) | 55 |
| Canadian Albums (Billboard) | 33 |
| Czech Albums (ČNS IFPI) | 28 |
| Dutch Albums (Album Top 100) | 64 |
| Finnish Albums (Suomen virallinen lista) | 6 |
| French Albums (SNEP) | 62 |
| German Albums (Offizielle Top 100) | 13 |
| Irish Albums (IRMA) | 62 |
| Italian Albums (FIMI) | 37 |
| Japanese Albums (Oricon) | 28 |
| Scottish Albums (Official Charts) | 35 |
| Spanish Albums (Promusicae) | 70 |
| Swedish Albums (Sverigetopplistan) | 25 |
| Swiss Albums (Schweizer Hitparade) | 28 |
| UK Albums (Official Charts) | 49 |
| UK Independent Albums (Official Charts) | 7 |
| UK Rock & Metal Albums (Official Charts) | 1 |
| US Billboard 200 | 12 |
| US Independent Albums (Billboard) | 2 |
| US Top Hard Rock Albums (Billboard) | 4 |
| US Top Rock Albums (Billboard) | 5 |
| US Indie Store Album Sales (Billboard) | 2 |

== Release history ==
| Region | Date | Label |
|---|---|---|
| International | September 12, 2011 | Nuclear Blast |
| United States | September 13, 2011 | Megaforce Records |
