= Rob Caggiano =

American guitarist

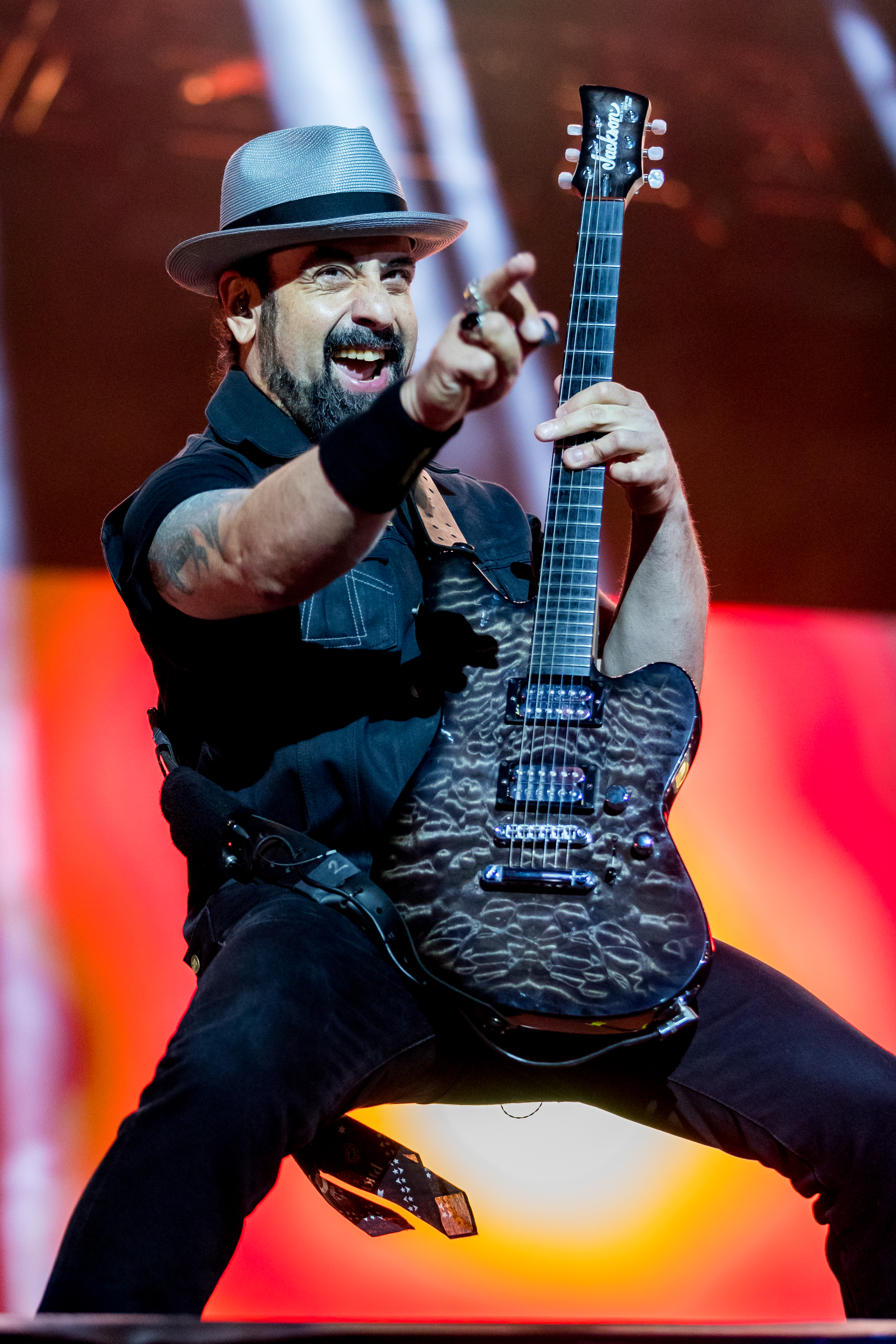
- Caggiano at Rock am Ring 2022

Background information
- Birth name: Robert Caggiano
- Born: November 7, 1976 (age 48) The Bronx, New York, U.S.
- Genres: Heavy metal; thrash metal; groove metal; hard rock; alternative metal; nu metal; rockabilly
- Occupations: Musician; record producer
- Instrument: Guitar
- Years active: 1996–present
- Formerly of: Anthrax; Boiler Room; The Damned Things; Volbeat

Robert Caggiano (born November 7, 1976) is an American guitarist and record producer. He was the lead guitarist of the Danish rock band Volbeat from 2013 to 2023 and of thrash metal band Anthrax from 2001 to 2005 and 2007 to 2013. He was also a member of nu metal band Boiler Room.

== Career ==
Caggiano's first professional band was Boiler Room that formed in 1996. The band caught the attention of Roadrunner Records after an opening slot for the band Orgy in 1999. After several delays, they eventually got Tommy Boy Records to release their debut album Can't Breathe. Soon after the release, the band broke up in summer 2000.

Caggiano first played with Anthrax from 2001 until 2005, exiting when their Among the Living lineup reunited, and later returning in 2007 following the end of that reunion. He appears on the albums We've Come for You All (2003) and Worship Music (2011), as well as the Greater of Two Evils compilation (2004; a live-in-the-studio recording of older material) and the live album Music of Mass Destruction (2004). He was also part of "The Big 4" tour during 2010 and 2011 which featured Anthrax, Megadeth, Slayer, and Metallica. The Bulgaria show was streamed and broadcast to theaters all over the world and the entire "Big 4" show came out on DVD in November 2010.

Caggiano is also known as a record producer/mixer under the alias of Scrap 60 Productions, most notably for producing Cradle of Filth, Anthrax, and Jesse Malin, along with many other prominent metal/hard rock bands. He was also the guitarist/songwriter for the Damned Things along with Scott Ian (Anthrax), Joe Trohman and Andy Hurley (Fall Out Boy), and Keith Buckley (Every Time I Die). The debut album of the Damned Things, Ironiclast, which was also produced and recorded by Caggiano, was released in December 2010.

In January 2013, it was announced that Caggiano had left Anthrax, reportedly in order to focus on studio production work for a while until he figured his next move as an artist. He said of his decision to leave "This is an extremely difficult and emotional decision for me to make but my heart is just steering me in a different direction right now. I've always been one to follow my heart in everything that I do and while this might be one of the hardest decisions I have ever had to make, it feels like the right one for me at this time."

In February 2013, it was announced that Caggiano had officially joined Danish hard rock band Volbeat as their lead guitarist. Originally called on as the record producer for Volbeat's new album Outlaw Gentlemen and Shady Ladies, Caggiano was asked to join as a full-time member two weeks into the recording process due to the chemistry between him and the other band members. In addition, Caggiano has also worked with singer Dani Filth, bassist King ov Hell, and drummer John Tempesta in a new band, Temple of the Black Moon.

2015 saw the retrospective release of the Soda Pop EP featuring three Caggiano guitar tracks from 1995.

In June 2023, Volbeat announced over social media that they had parted ways with Caggiano.

== Discography ==
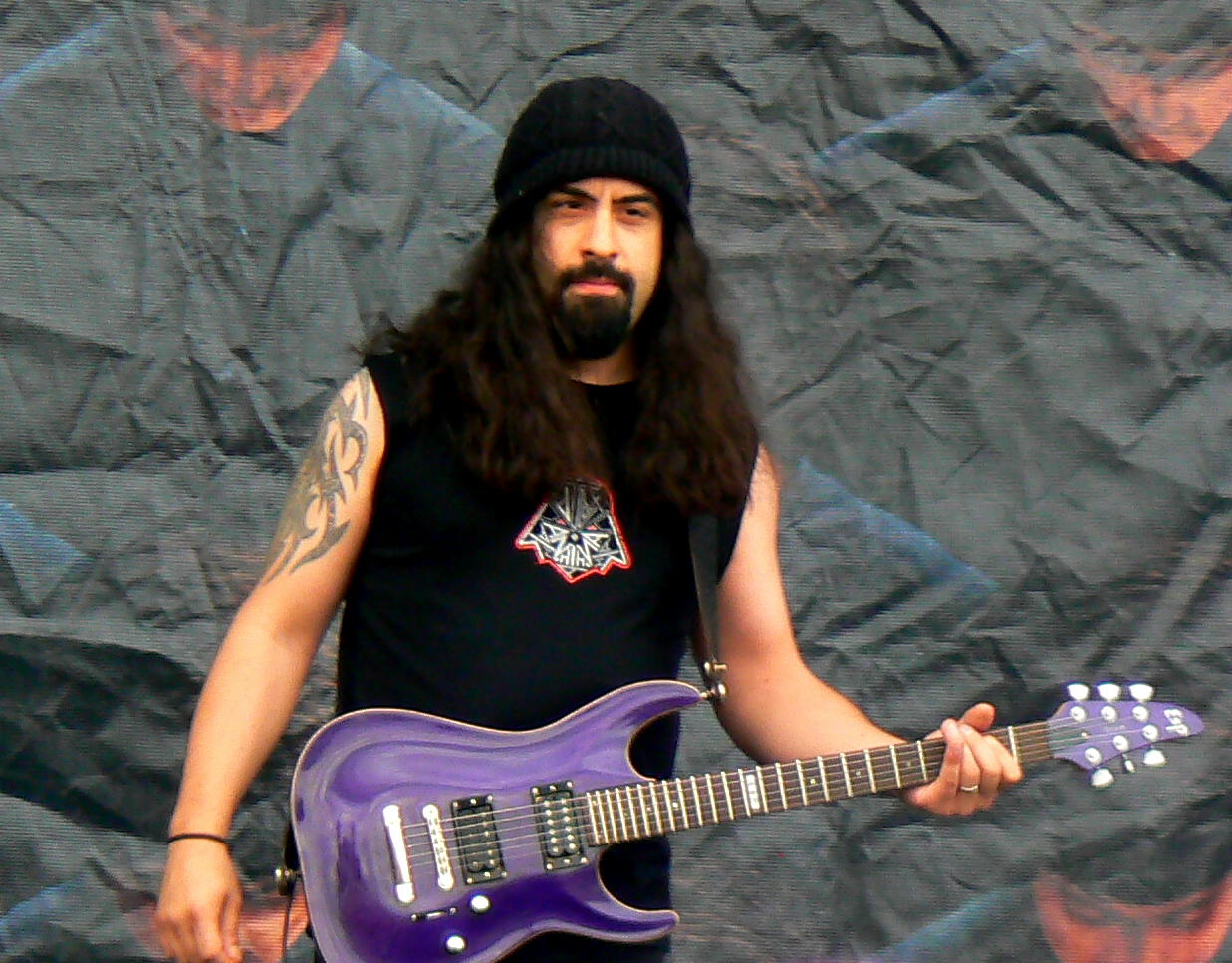
Caggiano performing in 2010

=== Anthrax ===
Release date	Title	Label
May 6, 2003	We've Come for You All	Sanctuary/Nuclear Blast
April 20, 2004	Music of Mass Destruction (live)	Sanctuary
November 23, 2004	The Greater of Two Evils	Sanctuary/Nuclear Blast
September 13, 2011	Worship Music	Megaforce/Nuclear Blast

=== Boiler Room ===
Release date	Title	Label
2000	Can't Breathe	Tommy Boy/Roadrunner Records

=== The Damned Things ===
Release date	Title	Label
2010	Ironiclast	Mercury Records

=== Volbeat ===
Release date	Title	Label
2013	Outlaw Gentlemen & Shady Ladies	Vertigo/Universal
2016	Seal the Deal & Let's Boogie	Vertigo/Universal
2019	Rewind, Replay, Rebound	Vertigo/Universal
2021	Servant of the Mind	Vertigo/Universal

== Production discography (selection) ==
- Cradle of Filth – Nymphetamine (Grammy nominated)
- Cradle of Filth – Thornography
- Sahg – Sahg 2
- Bleeding Through – The Truth
- Jesse Malin – Glitter in the Gutter (feat. Bruce Springsteen and Ryan Adams)
- Ill Niño – One Nation Underground
- Ill Niño – Revolution Revolución
- Machine Head – Supercharger Remix
- Anthrax – We've Come for You All
- Anthrax – The Greater of Two Evils
- Anthrax – Worship Music
- Prong – Remix 2010
- H2O – H2O
- The Agony Scene – The Darkest Red
- A Life Once Lost – Hunter
- Dry Kill Logic – The Darker Side of Nonsense
- 36 Crazyfists – Bitterness the Star
- Straight Line Stitch – When Skies Wash Ashore
- Chthonic – Mirror of Retribution
- Muzzy – Boathouse Sessions
- The Drama Club – The Drama Club EP
- Volbeat – Outlaw Gentlemen & Shady Ladies
- Twelve Gauge Valentine – Shock Value
