= Crab Society North =

Demo album by Stormtroopers of Death
- Released: July 1, 1985
- Length: 14:21

Stormtroopers of Death chronology
Crab Society North (1985)	Speak English or Die (1985)

Crab Society North is a demo album by American crossover thrash band Stormtroopers of Death. It was recorded on July 1, 1985 with a walkman put into a speaker. The demo was recorded in the kitchen of Pyramid Sound studios and contains mostly improvised material.

== Historical curio ==
The audio quality of the recording is substandard by any meter. However, it ultimately led to more widespread notoriety of the ultra-short "blipcore", as the longest 'song' on the demo—"Papa Benjamin"—is merely 58 seconds long.

Some of the songs found their way to subsequent releases by various bands. Stormtroopers of Death re-recorded the song "Diamonds & Rust" for their debut album Speak English Or Die; Billy Milano's band Method of Destruction recorded and released "Jim Gordon", "Bubble Butt" and "Bushwackateas" on their debut album U.S.A. For M.O.D.. Stormtroopers Of Death also incorporated a Crab Society North medley into their live shows; a short 7-second potpourri consisting of "Not!", "Momo", "Taint", "The Camel Boy" and "Diamonds & Rust". Included in the medley was the Stormtroopers of Death original "Anti-procrastination Song". They also performed "Vitality" on various occasions. Further, the track "Taint" was recorded and released by Anthrax as a B-side on their 1987 Indians EP.

Note that this is the first recording ever by Stormtroopers of Death. The name of the band had, according to Scott Ian, been conceived the same day.

== Title ==
The original Crab Society consisted of bass players Dan Lilker, known from Anthrax and Nuclear Assault, and Craig Setari, known from Straight Ahead. Crab Society had recorded a similar demo on a cheap C-tape deck, with short bursts of improvised noise, purposefully overdriven and distorted. When the other members of Stormtroopers of Death heard the tape, they wanted to record a similarly structured demo. To differentiate the two projects the demo was called Crab Society North, since the studio was located upstate New York, geographically north of the original setting.

== Track listing ==
1. Jim Gordon - 0:27
2. Your Kungfu Stinks - 0:26
3. Arrgh! - 0:06
4. You N... - 0:12
5. House of My Head - 0:07
6. Momo - 0:30
7. Bogunsbomp - 0:12
8. Steve Wright Rules - 0:09
9. Hammer before Knife - 0:48
10. You Bastard - 0:06
11. I've Been in a Cave for... - 0:04
12. Mano's - 0:22
13. Lou Kamada's - 0:04
14. The Leopard Killer - 0:13
15. The Bat Lived 0:10
16. By the Way - 0:01
17. Dan - 0:01
18. Let Me Say One Thing - 0:01
19. This Doesn't Leave the Room - 0:01
20. Not to Talk About Anthrax But ... - 0:02
21. Shit's Suck - 0:20
22. I'm Incredible - 0:03
23. Diamond and Rust - 0:03
24. Hey John - 0:11
25. Laughing, Happy, Happy, Joy as Glad, Decapitation - 0:07
26. Don't Do Anything Foolish - 0:34
27. We Are the Sock - 0:19
28. MDC Hang Out in Gay Bars - 0:04
29. E-Brake - 0:17
30. Listen Lady - 0:20
31. Leisuresuit - 0:03
32. Papa Benjamin - 0:58
33. 1 - 0:01
34. 2 - 0:01
35. 2 & 1- 0:01
36. DFP - 0:24
37. IHO - 0:27
38. BDFP - 0:02
39. Taint - 0:04
40. Vitality - 0:20
41. Tom Brown - 0:38
42. Loud Bell - 0:05
43. Bubble Butt - 0:25
44. Danny Spitz Will Fuck Anything - 0:38
45. Jogging With Fall - 0:15
46. Tony Two - 0:14
47. The Camel Boy - 0:03
48. July 1 - 0:03
49. Fluoride and the Captivity Creeps - 0:21
50. The Poisonous Midget - 0:03
51. Boln - 0:07
52. Lardas Hogan - 0:24
53. Emow - 0:18
54. DSL - 0:04
55. Mely Cow - 0:11
56. Bushwackateas - 0:20
57. Cowfucking Renee - 0:08
58. Rooster Fucker - 0:19
59. Neck to Neck - 0:02
60. The Drunk Guy - 0:39
61. Happy Tooth Paste Bag - 0:18
62. (!) - 0:01
63. Food-Dog-Golf!!! - 0:04

== Personnel ==
- Billy Milano – vocals
- Scott Ian – guitars
- Dan Lilker – bass
- Charlie Benante – drums

== See also ==
- CSN info page
- Danny Lilker interview
