= Lilith (album) =

Studio album by Butcher Babies
- Released: October 27, 2017
- Genre: Groove metal; thrash metal; metalcore
- Length: 52:38
- Label: Century Media
- Producer: Steve Evetts

Butcher Babies chronology
Take It Like a Man (2015)	Lilith (2017)	Eye for an Eye... / ...'Til the World's Blind (2023)

Lilith is the third album by the American heavy metal band Butcher Babies. It was released on October 27, 2017, through Century Media Records and was produced by Steve Evetts. It is the band's first release with drummer Chase Brickenden and their final release with bassist Jason Klein before his departure from the band in 2019. The album reached number 11 on the Billboard Independent Albums chart, and number 15 on the Billboard Hard Rock Albums chart. The standard edition of the album contains 11 tracks; the deluxe edition includes 5 bonus tracks from the band's 2014 covers EP Uncovered. The album art, insert panel and tour posters were designed by artist Justin Paul

== Reception ==
Loudwire noted that "There's no question Butcher Babies are a polarizing band who have some detractors, but Lilith will certainly earn them plenty of new converts", while Metal Hammer voiced a similar opinion with "Lilith could be the Butcher Babies album that finally wins over the band’s naysayers."

== Track listing ==
No.	Title	Writer(s)	Length
1.	"Burn the Straw Man"	Butcher Babies	4:05
2.	"Lilith"	Butcher Babies	3:27
3.	"Headspin"	Butcher Babies/Agustus Cryns	3:32
4.	"Korova"	Butcher Babies/Agustus Cryns	4:05
5.	"#Iwokeuplikethis"	Butcher Babies	3:01
6.	"The Huntsman"	Butcher Babies/Mitch Marlow	3:06
7.	"Controller"	Butcher Babies	3:04
8.	"Oceana"	Butcher Babies	3:32
9.	"Look What We've Done"	Butcher Babies/Brandon Saller	3:35
10.	"POMONA (Shit Happens)"	Butcher Babies	3:13
11.	"Underground and Overrated"	Butcher Babies	3:59

Deluxe edition bonus tracks
No.	Title	Writer(s)	Length
12.	"Beer Drinkers & Hell Raisers"	Frank Beard/Billy Gibbons/Joe Michael Hill	2:54
13.	"They're Coming to Take Me Away"	Jerry N. Bonaparte	3:16
14.	"Don't Give a Fuck"	Mike Clark/Michael Muir	2:22
15.	"Crazy Horses"	Alan Osmond/Merrill Osmond/Wayne Osmond	2:55
16.	"Pussy Whipped"	Charlie Benante/Scott Ian/Dan Lilker/Billy Milano	2:32
Total length:			52:38

== Personnel ==
Butcher Babies

- Carla Harvey – vocals
- Heidi Shepherd – vocals
- Henry Flury – guitars
- Jason Klein – bass
- Chase Brickenden – drums

Production

- Steve Evetts – production
- Justin Paul – art design

== Charts ==
Chart (2017)	Peak position
US Independent Albums (Billboard)	11
US Top Hard Rock Albums (Billboard)	15
US Top Rock Albums (Billboard)	43
