= Slamdance =

Slamdance may refer to:

- Moshing, a form of dance associated with punk rock and other musical genres
- Slamdance Film Festival, an annual event in Park City, Utah featuring the work of independent filmmakers
- Slamdance (Transformers), a fictional character in the Transformers universe
