= Rise of the Infidels =

Studio album by Stormtroopers of Death
- Released: August 21, 2007
- Recorded: The Fenix Club, Seattle, Washington (live recording)
- Genre: Crossover thrash
- Length: 55:38
- Label: Megaforce

Stormtroopers of Death chronology
Bigger than the Devil (1999)	Rise of the Infidels (2007)

Professional ratings
Review scores
Source	Rating
Allmusic	3.5/5 stars

Rise of the Infidels is the third and final album by crossover thrash band Stormtroopers of Death. The album was released in August 2007 on the Nuclear Blast label. The album is described as an "extended EP", with a running time close to an hour. According to singer Milano the album will "finally be the last of S.O.D.".

The EP contains four new tracks: "Stand Up and Fight", "Java Amigo", "United and Strong" and "Ready to Fight". Three of these tracks had been released previously: "Stand Up and Fight" (under the title "Pathmark Song") and "Java Amigo" were both on the New York's Hardest Vol. 3 compilation released in 2001, and "United and Strong" appears on the Japanese version of Live At Budokan. "Ready To Fight" is a Negative Approach cover, and "United and Strong" is an Agnostic Front cover.

== Track listing ==
No.	Title	Length
1.	"Stand Up and Fight"	2:34
2.	"Java Amigo"	1:16
3.	"United and Strong" (Agnostic Front cover)	1:09
4.	"Ready to Fight" (Negative Approach cover)	1:06
5.	"Ballad of Nirvana / March of the S.O.D."	2:10
6.	"Sgt. D and the S.O.D."	3:36
7.	"Kill Yourself"	2:44
8.	"Milano Mosh"	2:40
9.	"Speak English or Die"	4:48
10.	"Fuck the Middle East"	1:02
11.	"Douche Crew"	1:51
12.	"Ballad of Jimi Hendrix"	0:41
13.	"Ballad of Jim Morrison"	0:17
14.	"Ballad of INXS"	0:26
15.	"Ballad of Frank Sinatra"	0:42
16.	"Ballad of Nirvana"	1:34
17.	"Ballad of Freddy [sic] Mercury"	0:29
18.	"Chromatic Death"	0:50
19.	"Fist Banging Mania"	3:29
20.	"No Turning Back"	2:28
21.	"Milk"	8:37
22.	"Pussywhipped"	2:47
23.	"Freddy Krueger"	4:59
24.	"United Forces"	2:57

- Tracks 5–24 recorded live at the Fenix, Seattle, WA.

== Credits ==
- Billy Milano – lead vocals
- Scott Ian – guitars, backing vocals
- Dan Lilker – bass, backing vocals
- Charlie Benante – drums
