= Moshing =

Style of dance

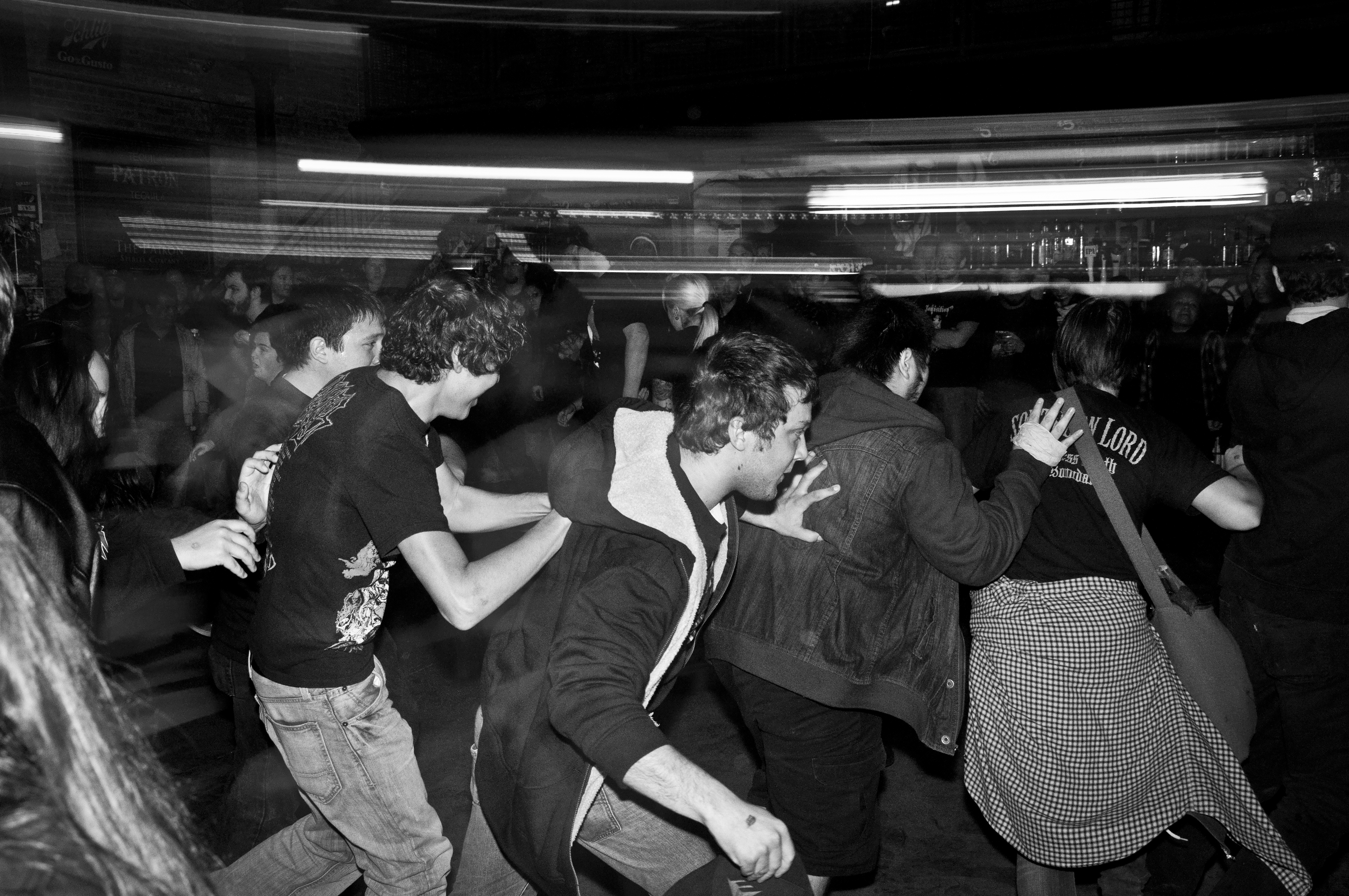
- Audience members moshing to American thrash metal band Toxic Holocaust
- Origin: Late 1970s, Huntington Beach and Long Beach, California, United States

Moshing (also known as slam dancing or simply slamming) is a style of dancing in which participants push or slam into each other. Taking place in an area called the mosh pit (often simply the pit), it is typically performed to aggressive styles of live music such as punk rock and heavy metal.

The dance style originated in the southern California hardcore punk scene, particularly Huntington Beach and Long Beach around 1978. Through the 1980s it spread to the hardcore scenes of Washington, D.C., Boston and New York where it developed local variants. In New York, the crossover between the city's hardcore scene and its metal scene led to moshing incorporating itself into metal beginning around 1985. In the 1990s, the success of grunge music led to moshing entering mainstream understanding and soon being incorporated into genres like electronic dance music and hip-hop.

Due to its violence, moshing has been subject to controversy, with a number of concert venues banning the practice, and some musicians being arrested for encouraging it and concertgoers for participating.

== Etymology ==
The name "mosh" originates from the word "mash". While performing their song "Banned in D.C." in either 1979 or 1980, H.R., vocalist of Washington D.C. hardcore band the Bad Brains, shouted "mash it—mash down Babylon!" Because of his Jamaican accent, some audience members heard this as "mosh it—mosh down Babylon". Beginning around 1983, metalheads began to refer to the slower sections of hardcore songs as "mosh parts", while hardcore musicians had called them "skank parts". Once Stormtroopers of Death released their debut album Speak English or Die in 1985, which included the track "Milano Mosh", the term began being applied to the style of dance. The term was then further popularised by Anthrax's 1987 song "Caught in a Mosh".

== History ==
=== Origins and early developments (1970s–1980s) ===
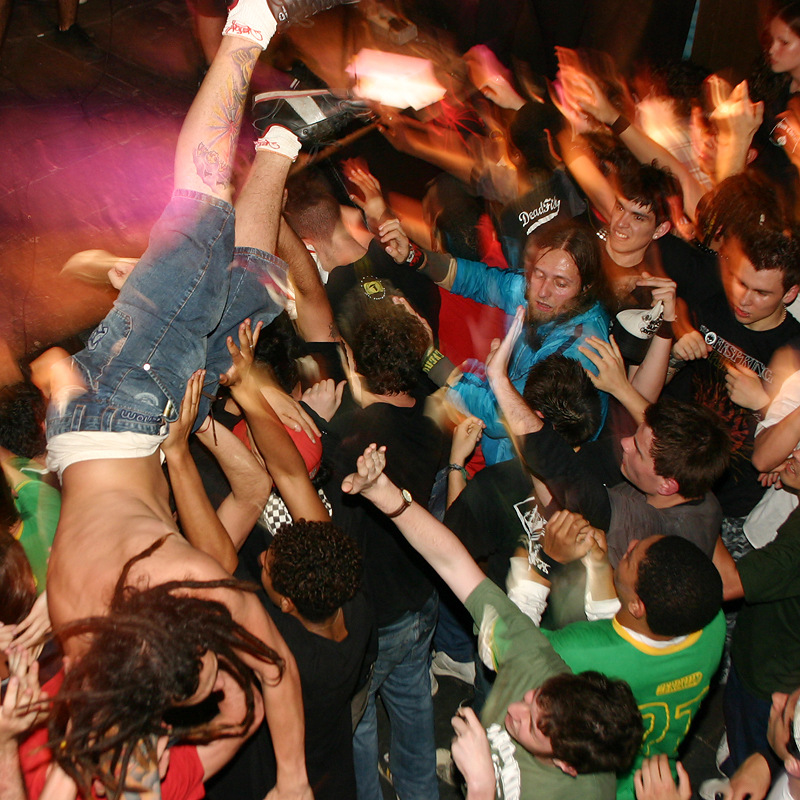
Crowd surfing over a mosh pit

The direct predecessor to moshing was the pogo, a style of dance done in the 1970s English punk rock scene, in which crowds members would jump up and down while holding their arms beside them. According to British rockumentary The Filth and the Fury, it was invented by Sex Pistols bassist Sid Vicious in 1976.

As a prominent punk rock scene in Southern California began to form in the late 1970s and early 1980s with early hardcore punk groups like Fear and Black Flag, moshing as it is understood today began to develop, originally termed "slam dancing". Participants in slam dancing at this time modified the pogo by bringing additional physical contact to those around them by pushing and running, as well introducing the idea of a recognised area where it takes place called a "pit". According to Steven Blush's book American Hardcore: A Tribal History (2001), there is a common belief amongst those involved in this scene that the dance was invented by former US marine Mike Marine in 1978. His specific style, involving "strutting around in a circle, swinging your arms and hitting everyone within reach", would go on to be termed "the Huntington Beach Strut". The Orange County Register writer Tom Berg credited, Costa Mesa venue, the Cuckoo's Nest (1976–1981) as the "birthplace of slam dancing". Examples of this early moshing were featured in the documentaries Another State of Mind, Urban Struggle, the Decline of Western Civilization, and American Hardcore. Fear's 1981 musical performance on Saturday Night Live also helped to expose moshing to a much wider audience.

By 1981, slam dancing had become the predominant style of crowd interaction in the southern California scene, as Huntington Beach and Long Beach became the scene's heart. Washington, D.C., band the Teen Idles toured California in August 1980, where they were first exposed to slam dancing. Upon returning home, they introduced the practice to the Washington, D.C. hardcore scene. That particular scene took a more chaotic approach to slam dancing and saw an increase in stage diving, whereas in the Boston hardcore scene slam dancing became violent and incorporated punching below the neck, developing a style called the "Boston thrash" or "punching penguins". Another development in the Boston scene was "pig piles" in which one person was pushed to the ground and others would begin to pile on top of them. This originated during a D.O.A. set, which was initiated by SSD guitarist Al Barile. The New York hardcore scene of the mid-1980s modified this early slam dancing into an additional, more violent style. In their distinction, participants may stay in one position on their own or collide with others, while executing a more exaggerated version of the arm and leg swinging of California slam dancing.

As fans of heavy metal music began to attend New York hardcore performances, they developed their own style of dancing based on New York hardcore's style of slam dancing. It was this group, particularly Scott Ian and Billy Milano who popularised the word "moshing". Ian and Milano's band Stormtroopers of Death released their debut album Speak English or Die in 1985, which included the track "Milano Mosh". This led to the term being applied to the style of dance. The same year, moshing began to incorporate itself into live performances by heavy metal bands, with one early example being during Anthrax's 1985 set at the Ritz.

=== Mainstream crossover (1990s–present) ===
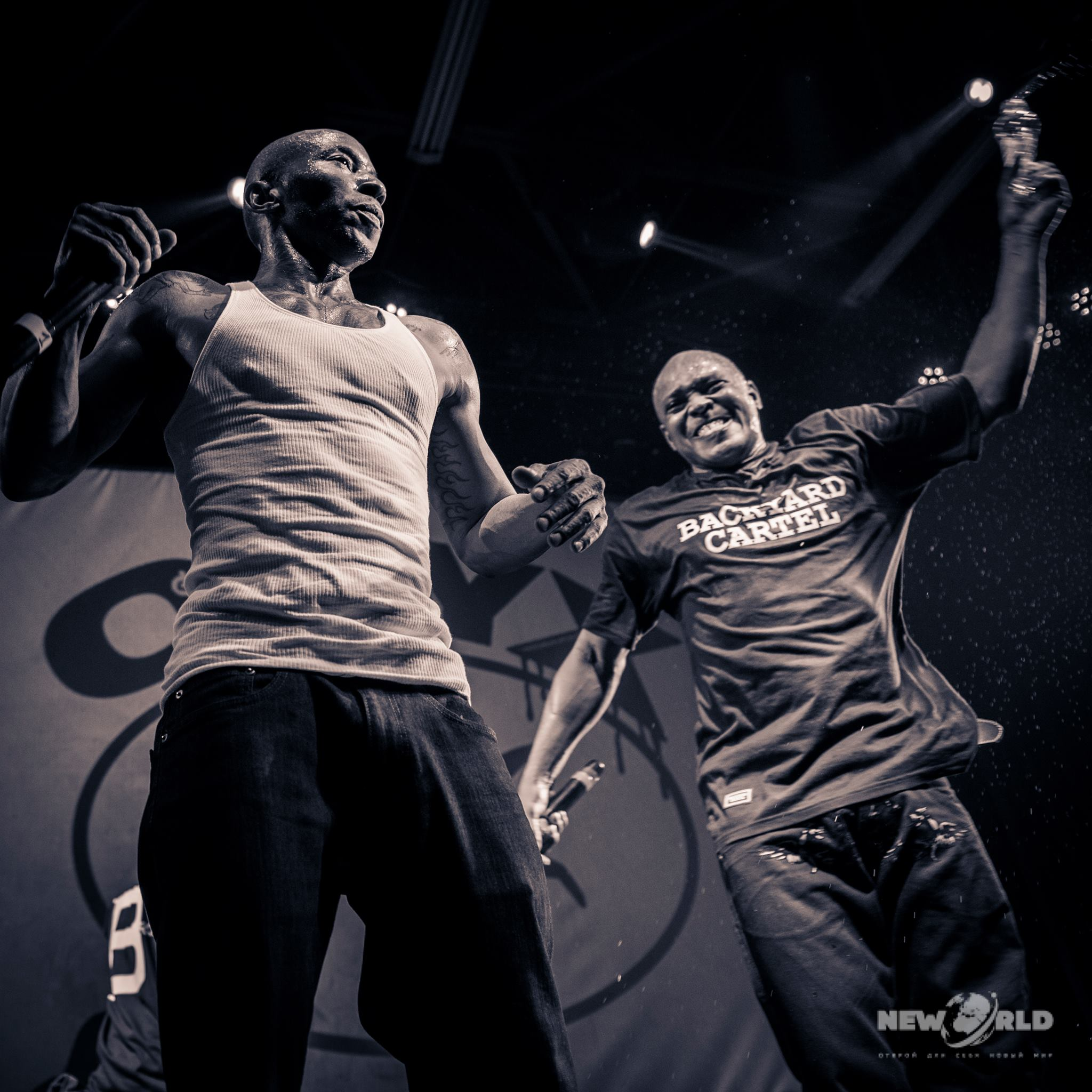
Onyx helped popularise moshing in hip hop with their 1993 single "Slam".

Moshing entered mainstream consciousness with the rise of grunge in the early 1990s. Grunge becoming the dominant force in rock music, brought with it aspects of genres like hardcore, punk and ska, and in turn, pop culture became aware of the mosh pit. This was exacerbated by the success of Lollapalooza, which began in 1991 as a touring festival. In his book Festivals: A Music Lover's Guide to the Festivals You Need To Know, writer Oliver Keens stated that "Lollapalooza's greatest impact was to expose Middle America to the joys of stage-diving and moshing...You can see Lollapalooza's legacy in the way mosh pits have become an integral part of youth culture; beyond rock and metal". By 1992, the practice had become so common that concertgoers began to mosh to non-aggressive rock bands like the Cranberries.

Moshing slowly entered hip-hop during live performances by the Beastie Boys, who began as a hardcore punk band before adopting the hip-hop style they became known for. During Public Enemy and Ice-T's European tour in the late 1980s, the artists witnessed moshing during their performances, which was still not commonplace during hip-hop concerts. The 1991 collaboration song Bring the Noise by thrash metal band Anthrax and hip-hop group Public Enemy led to a number of mixed genre tours, which brought metal's moshing to the attention of hip-hop fans. This was solidified as a part of hip-hop by Onyx's 1993 single "Slam", a song which alluded to slam dancing and had a music video featuring moshing. Following the video's release, pits became increasingly common during performances by hip-hop artists including Busta Rhymes, M.O.P. and the Wu-Tang Clan.

Moshing has been present during electronic dance music performance since at least 1996, with the Prodigy's performance at Endfest. By 1999, moshing had become commonplace during techno performances, especially hardcore techno. At late 1990s parties such as New York's H-Bomb, Milwaukee's Afternoon Delight and Los Angeles' Twilight, attendees inverted the intellectualism and PLUR credo which permeated electronic music genres, like intelligent dance music, earlier in the decade, by incorporating crowd participation acts similar to those found at hardcore punk, metal and goth performances. In the 2010s, the success of Skrillex and his "DJ as rock star" attitude brought moshing into mainstream dance music.

The 2010s saw the rise of a number of hip-hop artists who used an "anarchic energy", which some critics at the time compared to that of punk. These artists, notably A$AP Mob, Odd Future and Danny Brown, revived moshing in mainstream hip-hop, which led to pits becoming a staple of performances in the genre. Amongst these artists "rage" became a common synonym for moshing. The first person to use the term "rage" in the context of hip-hop is said to be Kid Cudi, with his "Mr. Rager" alter ego, which influenced Travis Scott who later adopted the term "rage" and made it an important part of his own aesthetic. Scott was arrested in 2015 and 2017 for inciting riots after encouraging these actions, with the latter event leading to an attendee being partially paralyzed. However, the most infamous example of this at his concerts was the 2021 Astroworld Festival crowd crush, which left 25 hospitalized and 10 dead. Trippie Redd and Playboi Carti used the name in their 2021 song "Miss the Rage", referencing how Trippie Redd longed for during COVID-19 lockdowns. It inspired the name of the trap music subgenre rage.

== Variations ==
- The Huntington Beach strut or simply the HB Strut is the original style of slam dancing which was popular the Southern California hardcore in the late 1970s and 1980s. It involves "strutting around in a circle, swinging your arms and hitting everyone within reach".
- The Boston thrash or punching penguins is Boston's more violent development upon the Huntington Beach strut, which incorporates punching below the neck.
- A pig pile is a style moshing popular amongst the Boston hardcore scene in the 1980s. It involved one person being pushed to the ground and others beginning to pile on top of them.
- Wrecking is a style of moshing that is prevalent in the psychobilly scene. It involves standing in one spot with arms flailing in order to make contact with those around. The practice was originated by fans of the Meteors and named in reference to the band's fanbase being called the "Wrecking Crew". Meteors drummer Mark Robertson specifically cited wrecking as beginning with Adam and the Ants, when they become involved in the psychobilly scene.
- A circle pit is a form of moshing in which participants run in a circular motion around the edges of the pit, often leaving an open space in the centre.
- A wall of death is a form of moshing which sees the audience divide down the middle into two halves either side of the venue, before each side runs towards the other, slamming the two sides together. According to Noisecreep, the consensus is that it was invented by American hardcore punk band Sick of it All. However, the band's vocalist Lou Koller has stated that he merely revived the practice in 1996, as he often saw a similar act performed in the 1980s New York hardcore scene. Loudwire senior writer Graham Hartmann referred to it as "Perhaps the most bad ass and dangerous ritual you can experience in a mosh pit". Venues will often ask bands not to organize the Wall of Death themselves due to the inherent risk involved and liability.
- Hardcore dancing is a term that covers multiple style of moshing including windmilling two stepping, floorpunching, picking up pennies, axehandling, bucking, and wheelbarrowing. The practice began in New York City in the 1980s.
  - A two step is a style of hardcore dancing done during mid-tempo sections of songs. It is a running-in-place motion in which legs are crossed over one another while the opposite arm punches downwards. It descends directly from skanking.
- Crowd killing is a mosh-pit practice in which a mosher moshes against the crowd around the sides of the pit. According to Kerrang! writer Amanda van Poznak it is generally looked down upon.
- Hip-hop pits are generally less violent than those in hardcore, instead consisting of "a mass of people enthusiastically nudg[ing] each other while jumping in unison".
- Slingshot when a person bends down in the audience of a show and another person runs at them, the one bending down grabs the persons foot and flings them into the crowd, this often leads to crowd surfing. It can be dangerous to be flung as well as dangerous for bystanders as they could be hit by the flung person.

== Physical properties of emergent behavior ==
A clip of moshing music fans

Researchers from Cornell University studied the emergent behavior of crowds at mosh pits by analyzing online videos, finding similarities with models of 2-D gases in equilibrium. Simulating the crowds with computer models, they found out that a simulation dominated by flocking parameters produced highly ordered behavior, forming vortices like those seen in the videos.

The study also found, that around 95% of the observed circle pits are rotating in a counter-clockwise direction. This is correlating with the strong right hand preference that is seen in humans.

== Opposition, criticism and controversy ==
While moshing is seen by some as a form of positive fan feedback or expression of enjoyment, it has also drawn criticism over dangerous excesses in its violence. Injuries and even deaths have been reported in the crush of mosh pits.

The American post-hardcore band Fugazi opposed slamdancing at their live shows. Members of Fugazi were reported to single out and confront specific members of the audience, politely asking them to stop hurting other audience members, or hauling them on stage to apologize on the microphone.

Consolidated, an industrial dance group of the 1990s, stood against moshing. On their third album, Play More Music, they included the song "The Men's Movement", which proclaimed the inappropriate nature of slamdancing. The song consisted of audio recordings during concerts from the audience and members of Consolidated, arguing about moshing.

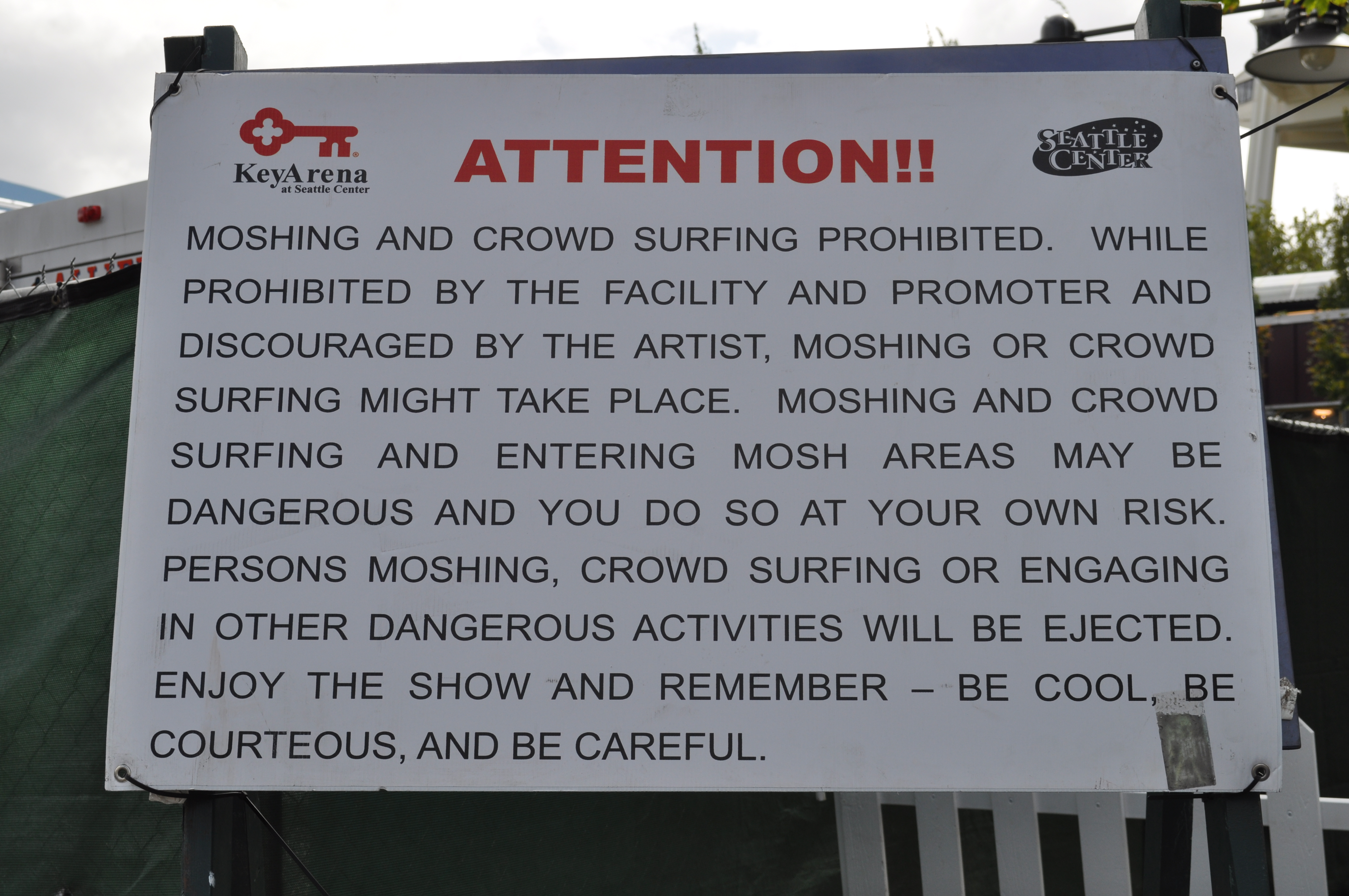
A no-moshing sign at a concert

In the 1990s, the Smashing Pumpkins took a stance against moshing, following two incidents which resulted in fatalities. At a 1996 Pumpkins concert in Dublin, Ireland, 17-year-old Bernadette O'Brien was crushed by moshing crowd members and later died in hospital, despite warnings from the band that people were getting hurt. At another concert, singer Billy Corgan said to the audience:

I just want to say one thing to you, you young, college lughead-types. I've been watchin' people like you sluggin' around other people for seven years. And you know what? It's the same shit. I wish you'd understand that in an environment like this, and in a setting like this, it's fairly inappropriate and unfair to the rest of the people around you. I, and we, publicly take a stand against moshing!

Another fan died at a Smashing Pumpkins concert in Vancouver, British Columbia, Canada, on September 24, 2007. The 20-year-old man was dragged out of the mosh pit, unconscious, to be pronounced dead at a hospital after first-aid specialists attempted to save him.

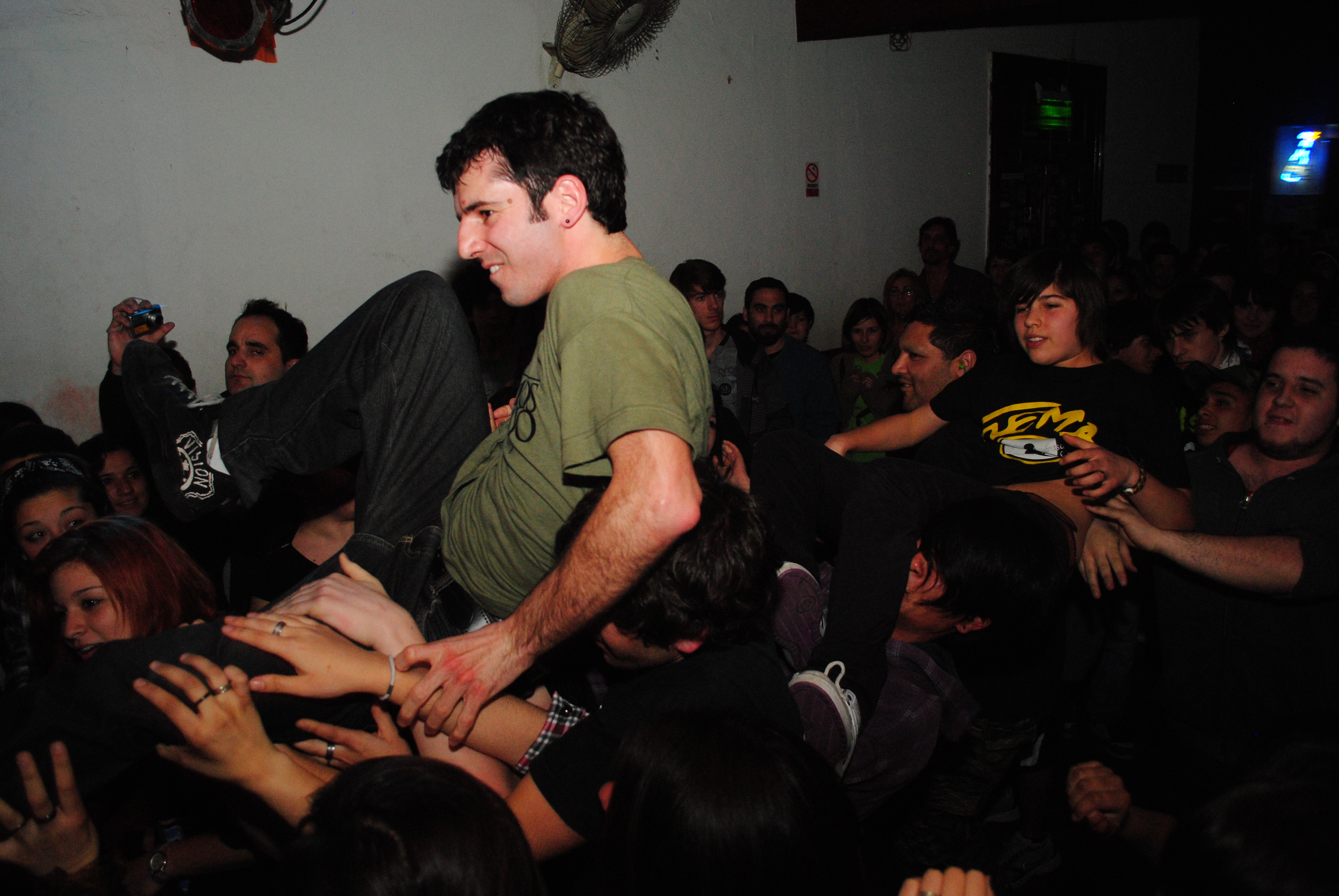
A crowd of moshers, with a few people "crowdsurfing" on top of the mosh pit

Reel Big Fish's 1998 album Why Do They Rock So Hard? included their mosh-criticizing song "Thank You for Not Moshing", which contained lyrics that suggested that at least some individuals in the mosh pit were simply bullies who were finding conformity in the violence.

Mike Portnoy, founder and drummer of Dream Theater, and Avenged Sevenfold where he briefly filled in after the death of The Rev, criticized moshing in an interview published on his website:

I think our audience have become a little bit more attentive and less of that type of [mosh] mentality [...] I understand you want to release that energy... [but] once people start doing that during "Through Her Eyes" it gets ridiculous [...] So this time around we're consciously aiming at theaters that people can actually sit down and enjoy the show and be comfortable [...] without having to worry about their legs falling off or being kicked in the face by a Mosh Pit. So [that] will probably eliminate that problem anyway.

Sixteen-year-old Jessica Michalik was an Australian girl who died as a result of asphyxiation after being crushed in a mosh pit during the 2001 Big Day Out festival during a performance by nu metal band Limp Bizkit. At that same festival, post-hardcore band At the Drive-In ended their set early after only three songs due to the audience's moshing.

Joey DeMaio of American heavy metal band Manowar has been known to temporarily stop concerts upon seeing moshing and crowd surfing, claiming it is dangerous to other fans.

Former Slipknot percussionist Chris Fehn spoke about the state of audience interaction following the onstage incident and subsequent legal issues involving Lamb of God's Randy Blythe, who was eventually found not guilty of criminal wrongdoing in the death of a concertgoer, despite being held "morally responsible". Fehn briefly addressed the Blythe situation, stating "I think, especially in America, moshing has turned into a form of bullying. The big guy stands in the middle and just trucks any small kid that comes near him. They don't mosh properly anymore. It sucks because that's not what it's about. Those guys need to be kicked out. A proper mosh pit is a great way to be as a group and dance, and just do your thing."

== See also ==
- Headbanging
- Crowd surfing
- Skank (dance)
- Stage diving
- Wotagei, a spontaneous dance performed by crowds, commonly associated with Japanese idols
