= Hardcore dance =

Hardcore dance may refer to:

- Hardcore dancing, several styles of moshing
- Hardcore (electronic dance music genre)
