= Eye for an Eye... / ...'Til the World's Blind =

Eye for an Eye... /...'Til the World's Blind
- Cover for Eye for an Eye...

Studio album by Butcher Babies
- Released: July 7, 2023
- Recorded: 2020–2022
- Genres: Metalcore; heavy metal
- Length: 24:24 (Eye for an Eye...); 47:00 (...'Til the World's Blind); 71:24 (total)
- Label: Century Media
- Producers: Matt Good, Josh Schroeder

Butcher Babies chronology
Lilith (2017)	Eye for an Eye... /...'Til the World's Blind (2023)

Singles from ...'Til the World's Blind
- 1. "Red Thunder" Released: May 16, 2023; 2. "Last December" Released: June 9, 2023

Professional ratings
Review scores
Source	Rating
Blabbermouth.net	8/10
Metal Injection	8/10
This Day in Metal	4.5/5 stars

Eye for an Eye... / ...'Til the World's Blind are the fourth and fifth albums by the American heavy metal band Butcher Babies. They were released on July 7, 2023, through Century Media Records and were produced by Josh Schroeder, known for his work with Lorna Shore and King 810. They are the band's only releases with bassist Ricky Bonazza (replacing longtime member Jason Klein) and the final releases to feature drummer Chase Brickenden (who was replaced by Blake Bailey in 2023) and vocalist Carla Harvey before her departure on July 20, 2024.

Eye for an Eye... contains six tracks, with most of them previously released as singles since 2020 and display a lighter and "poppier" sound. ...'Til the World's Blind features 14 tracks that show a darker and heavier sound.

== Background ==
Two singles from ...'Til the World's Blind were released ahead of its release. "Red Thunder" was released on May 16, 2023. The lyrics for that single, written by vocalists Heidi Shepherd and Carla Harvey, were inspired by Carla's sister Julia, who was born with microcephaly and died from it at a young age. "Last December" was released on June 9, 2023. The song was written in April 2020 in a Zoom meeting between Shepherd, Harvey, guitarist Henry Flury, and writer Blair Daly, inspired by Shepherd's experience with suicidal ideation in December 2019.

== Track listing ==
Eye for an Eye... track listing
No.	Title	Length
1.	"Sleeping with the Enemy"	3:33
2.	"Bottom of a Bottle"	3:20
3.	"Yorktown"	4:07
4.	"Dreaming in Color"	3:15
5.	"Last Dance"	3:32
6.	"It's Killin' Time, Baby!" (featuring Craig Mabbitt of Escape the Fate)	3:25
7.	"Sleeping with the Enemy (Radio Edit)" (featuring Andy James of Five Finger Death Punch)	3:12
Total length:		24:24

...'Til the World's Blind track listing
No.	Title	Length
1.	"Darn That Nightmare"	1:25
2.	"Red Thunder"	3:58
3.	"Backstreets of Tennessee"	2:54
4.	"Wrong End of the Knife"	3:32
5.	"Last December"	4:47
6.	"Beaver Cage"	3:38
7.	"Best Friend" (Saweetie cover)	2:27
8.	"I Fell Asleep at the Table"	3:26
9.	"This Is the Part" (featuring Chad Gray of Mudvayne)	3:48
10.	"Spittin' Teeth"	3:13
11.	"King Pin"	3:33
12.	"The Devil Cut Me Off"	3:18
13.	"Til the World's Blind"	5:18
14.	"Don't Touch My Pole"	1:43
Total length:		47:00

== Personnel ==
Butcher Babies

- Heidi Shepherd – vocals
- Carla Harvey – vocals
- Henry Flury – guitars
- Ricky Bonazza – bass
- Chase Brickenden – drums

Additional personnel

- Craig Mabbitt – vocals on "It's Killin' Time, Baby!"
- Andy James – guitar on "Sleeping With The Enemy (Radio Edit)"
- Chad Gray – vocals on "This Is The Part"

Production

- Matt Good – production
- Josh Schroeder – production
