= Butcher Babies (EP) =

EP by Butcher Babies
- Released: May 29, 2012
- Recorded: Los Angeles, California
- Genre: Groove metal, metalcore, thrash metal
- Length: 12:44
- Label: Self-released
- Producer: Andrew Murdock

Butcher Babies chronology
Blonde Girls All Look the Same (2011)	Butcher Babies (2012)	Goliath (2013)

Singles from Butcher Babies EP
- 1. "Mr. Slowdeath" Released: May 1, 2012

Butcher Babies is the first EP released by the American heavy metal band Butcher Babies. It was self-released on May 29, 2012. The EP was produced by Andrew Murdock.

== Reception ==
Rock Journalist Keith Valcourt stated on behalf of the Butcher Babies: “The Hottest Band in the World” in his review of a show. The Butcher Babies deliver a loud crashing blend of heavy metal, punk and thrash that recalls Pantera, adding their stage show embodies the horror antics of Alice Cooper and Rob Zombie. Carla and Heidi don’t merely sing: they assault the crowd with a blinding flash of aggression and abuse. And the crowd loves them for it.”

== Release and promotion ==
On May 1, 2012, the Butcher Babies Premiered a New Song, "Mr. Slowdeath". On May 24, they released their first music video for "Mr. Slowdeath", produced by Mudrock (Avenged Sevenfold, Godsmack).

== Track listing ==
No.	Title	Length
1.	"Axe Wound"	4:13
2.	"Mr. Slowdeath"	2:52
3.	"Jesus Needs More Babies for His War Machine"	4:56
4.	"National Bloody Anthem"	1:23
Total length:		12:44

== Personnel ==
Butcher Babies

- Heidi Shepherd – vocals
- Carla Harvey – vocals
- Jason Klein – bass
- Henry Flury – guitar
- Chris Warner – drums

Production

- Andrew Murdock – production
