= Goliath (Butcher Babies album) =

Studio album by Butcher Babies
- Released: July 9, 2013
- Recorded: Los Angeles, California
- Genres: Groove metal, metalcore
- Length: 42:14
- Label: Century Media
- Producer: Josh Wilbur

Butcher Babies chronology
Butcher Babies (2012)	Goliath (2013)	Take It Like a Man (2015)

Singles from Goliath
- 1. "I Smell A Massacre" Released: June 6, 2013; 2. "Magnolia Blvd." Released: June 20, 2013; 3. "The Deathsurround" Released: June 20, 2013

Professional ratings
Review scores
Source	Rating
Dead Press!	8/10
Decibel	1/10
Metal.de	3/10
Metal Forces	8.5/10
Metal Hammer Germany	2/7
Metal Hammer UK	3.5/5 stars
New Noise Magazine	1/5 stars
Outburn	7/10
Rock Hard	6/10
Rock Sound	5/10

Goliath is the debut album by the American heavy metal band Butcher Babies, released on July 9, 2013, in the U.S., and July 22 in Europe. The album was produced by Josh Wilbur.

== Reception and sales ==
The single "I Smell A Massacre" reached No. 8 on the Liquid Metal Devil's Dozen countdown and "Magnolia Blvd." is played on Octane. 'GOLIATH' landed the Butcher Babies at the top spot on the Billboard New Artist/Heatseakers chart at No. 3; while also entering the Billboard Top 200 album chart at No. 112 with first-week sales selling about 3,300 copies.

== Recording, release and promotion ==
The Butcher Babies have stated in an interview that "Working with Josh Wilbur was an incredible experience because he helped us explore ourselves as musicians and further develop the unique sound that is the BUTCHER BABIES," said the band of their recording experience. "Being a debut album, this has been in the works since we were young, and we are so proud to have created a collaboration of all our personal influences into one complete sound."

Carla stated on behalf of their first full-length being released on a major label, "We needed a label to take us to that next level. We're very proud of what we did on our own, but it was time to give the reins to someone else. We're very hands on. We run everything, but we need that machine behind us as well."

=== Singles ===
On June 6, the band released the first single off their debut album "I Smell A Massacre".[11] On June 20, the band streamed two other songs titled "The Deathsurround" & "Magnolia Blvd.".[12]

On June 6, a lyric video for the song "I Smell a Massacre" was released.

== Track listing ==
No.	Title	Length
1.	"I Smell a Massacre"	3:34
2.	"Magnolia Blvd."	4:05
3.	"C8h18 (Gasoline)"	3:44
4.	"Grim Sleeper"	4:01
5.	"Goliath"	3:28
6.	"In Denial"	4:04
7.	"Give Me Reason"	3:24
8.	"The Mirror Never Lies"	4:01
9.	"Dead Poet"	4:33
10.	"The Deathsurround"	3:05
11.	"Axe Wound"	4:15
12.	"Werewolf of Wysteria" (Japanese Bonus Track)	3:00
Total length:		45:14

== Personnel ==
Butcher Babies

- Carla Harvey – vocals
- Heidi Shepherd – vocals
- Henry Flury – guitars
- Jason Klein – bass
- Chris Warner – drums

Production

- Josh Wilbur – production

== Charts ==
Chart (2013)	Peak position
US Billboard 200	112
US Heatseekers Albums	3
