= Live at Budokan (Stormtroopers of Death album) =

Live album by Stormtroopers of Death
- Released: 1992
- Recorded: March 21, 1992
- Venue: The Ritz
- Genre: Crossover thrash
- Length: 50:45
- Label: Megaforce
- Producer: Alex Perialas

Stormtroopers of Death chronology
Speak English or Die (1985)	Live at Budokan (1992)	Bigger than the Devil (1999)

Professional ratings
Review scores
Source	Rating
Allmusic	3/5 stars

Live at Budokan is a live album released in 1992 by American crossover thrash band Stormtroopers of Death. The album is a recording of a reunion concert alongside Agnostic Front and Morbid Angel, and includes the majority of the longer tracks from their debut album Speak English or Die, some previously unheard tracks, as well as covers of the bands M.O.D., Ministry, Nirvana, and Fear.

Although its title refers to Budokan, a famous venue in Tokyo, the concert and recording took place at the Ritz in New York City. The title is a play on Cheap Trick's seminal At Budokan live album from 1978.

The Japanese release of the album contains three additional tracks; "The Ballad of Jim Morrison", "The Ballad of Freddie Mercury" and "United and Strong".

== Track listing ==
1. "Intro" – 0:36
2. "March of the SOD" – 2:02
3. "Sargent D and the SOD" – 2:47
4. "Kill Yourself" – 2:55
5. "Momo" – 0:43
6. "Pi Alpha Nu" – 2:58
7. "Milano Mosh" – 1:42
8. "Speak English or Die" – 3:37
9. "Chromatic Death" – 1:04
10. "Fist Banging Mania" – 2:32
11. "The Camel Boy" – 0:23
12. "No Turning Back" – 0:51
13. "Milk" – 2:07
14. "Vitality" – 1:23
15. "Fuck the Middle East" – 0:54
16. "Douche Crew" – 2:04
17. "Get a Real Job" – 2:44 (M.O.D.)
18. "The Ballad of Jimi Hendrix" – 0:34
19. "Livin' in the City" (Fear) – 2:08
20. "Pussy Whipped" – 3:29
21. "Stigmata" (Jourgensen) – 2:53
22. "Thieves" (Ministry) – 1:45
23. "Freddy Krueger" – 3:04
24. "Territorial Pissings" (Cobain) – 2:46
25. "United Forces" – 3:20

== Credits ==
- Billy Milano – lead vocals
- Scott Ian – guitars, backing vocals, lead vocals on "Thieves", drums on "Territorial Pissings" and "United Forces"
- Dan Lilker – bass, backing vocals
- Charlie Benante – drums, guitar solo on "Territorial Pissings" and "United Forces"
