= Bigger than the Devil =

Studio album by Stormtroopers of Death
- Released: May 18, 1999
- Genres: Crossover thrash, groove metal
- Length: 39:33
- Label: Nuclear Blast
- Producer: Tim Gilles

Stormtroopers of Death chronology
Live at Budokan (1992)	Bigger than the Devil (1999)	Rise of the Infidels (2007)

Professional ratings
Review scores
Source	Rating
AllMusic	4/5 stars

Bigger than the Devil is the second album by crossover thrash band Stormtroopers of Death (S.O.D.). The album was released in May 1999 on the Nuclear Blast label. Its cover design is based on Iron Maiden's 1982 album The Number of the Beast and its title is a play on words on The Beatles member John Lennon proclaiming The Beatles were "bigger (more popular) than Jesus Christ".

Subsequent releases have included both the entire Seasoning the Obese EP—incorporating both tracks "Seasoning the Obese" and "Raise Your Sword"—as well as the "Ballad of the Scorpions" (originally released simply as "Rock You Like a Hurricane" on 2000s "A Tribute to the Scorpions"), bringing the total number of tracks to 28.

"Seasoning the Obese" is a reference to the Slayer song/album Seasons in the Abyss, whereas "Celtic Frosted Flakes" is a reference to the Swiss extreme metal band Celtic Frost and "L.A.T.K.C.H" stands for "Limp Against the Korn Chamber Head", a reference to various nu metal and alternative metal bands such as Limp Bizkit, Rage Against the Machine, Korn, Coal Chamber and Machine Head.

"Ballad of Michael H." references Michael Hutchence and interpolates INXS' "Need You Tonight".

Anthrax's song "Imitation of Life" on the album Among the Living used the guitar riff from the intro and outro of "Aren't You Hungry?" Subsequently the thrash band M.O.D. used a different riff on their recording of the S.O.D. song.

== Track listing ==
All tracks written by Stormtroopers of Death

No.	Title	Length
1.	"Bigger than the Devil"	2:29
2.	"The Crackhead Song"	1:47
3.	"Kill the Assholes"	2:51
4.	"Monkeys Rule"	1:46
5.	"Skool Bus"	0:36
6.	"King at the King / Evil Is In"	2:20
7.	"Black War"	2:26
8.	"Celtic Frosted Flakes"	1:15
9.	"Charlie Don't Cheat"	0:24
10.	"The Song That Don't Go Fast"	1:52
11.	"Shenanigans"	2:17
12.	"Dog on the Tracks"	0:04
13.	"Xerox"	0:54
14.	"Make Room, Make Room"	3:31
15.	"Free Dirty Needles"	2:36
16.	"Fugu"	0:07
17.	"Noise That's What"	1:11
18.	"We All Bleed Red (featuring Roger Miret)"	2:33
19.	"Frankenstein and His Horse"	0:21
20.	"Every Tiny Molecule"	1:03
21.	"Aren't You Hungry?"	3:18
22.	"L.A.T.K.C.H."	0:27
23.	"Ballad of Michael H."	0:13
24.	"Ballad of Phil H."	0:08
25.	"Moment of Truth"	3:04
Total length:		39:33

Bonus tracks on later releases
No.	Title	Length
26.	"Seasoning the Obese"	2:42
27.	"Raise Your Sword"	4:12
28.	"Ballad of the Scorpions"	0:19

== Personnel ==
Stormtroopers of Death (S.O.D.)

- Billy Milano – lead vocals
- Scott Ian – guitars, backing vocals, first solo on "Seasoning The Obese"
- Dan Lilker – bass, backing vocals, second solo on "Seasoning The Obese"
- Charlie Benante – drums, guitar solo on "Moment of Truth"

Production

- Tim Gilles - production, engineering
- Rich Wielgosz - assistant engineering
- Vincent Wojno - mixing
