= Take It Like a Man (Butcher Babies album) =

Studio album by Butcher Babies
- Released: August 21, 2015
- Recorded: November 2014 – April 2015
- Genre: Thrash metal; metalcore; groove metal
- Length: 44:57
- Label: Century Media
- Producer: Logan Mader

Butcher Babies chronology
Goliath (2013)	Take It Like a Man (2015)	Lilith (2017)

Singles from Take It Like a Man
- 1. "Monsters Ball" Released: June 10, 2015; 2. "Never Go Back" Released: July 11, 2015; 3. "Igniter" Released: October 19, 2015

Professional ratings
Review scores
Source	Rating
Kerrang!	2/5 stars
Metal.de	4/10
laut.de	3/5 stars
Metal Hammer	3.5/5 stars
Rock Hard	6/10
Ultimate Guitar	5/10

Take It Like a Man is the second album by the American heavy metal band Butcher Babies. It was released on August 21, 2015, through Century Media Records.

== History ==
On November 5, 2014, the band announced that they had begun work on their upcoming second studio album. The band completed work on the album on April 3, 2015. The band revealed that the album was a return to their thrash metal roots. The band also revealed the new album will feature a rerecorded version of their first single from 2010, "Blonde Girls All Look the Same".

On June 10, 2015, the band revealed the title of their upcoming album to be Take It Like a Man, and also released the first single of the album, "Monsters Ball", despite original plans to release "Never Go Back" as the lead single. The band revealed that the record label and management expressed dislike for the album title and artwork, and that the band had to fight to keep them. Regarding the album title, vocalist Carla Harvey said:

We all come from different places and backgrounds, but every member of this band had to fight to be the person he or she is today. That's the whole basis for the record. It's not a gender thing. It's the inner strength you have to find to pull your boots up and keep moving forward, whatever the situation may be.

— Carla Harvey

On June 26, the band released a music video for the lead single, "Monsters Ball". On July 11, the band released the song "Never Go Back" as the second single of the album. On October 19, the band released a music video for the song "Igniter".

== Track listing ==
No.	Title	Length
1.	"Monsters Ball"	3:57
2.	"Igniter"	2:46
3.	"The Cleansing"	3:55
4.	"The Butcher"	3:58
5.	"Gravemaker"	4:41
6.	"Thrown Away"	3:38
7.	"Never Go Back"	3:28
8.	"Marquee"	4:19
9.	"Blood Soaked Hero"	3:36
10.	"Dead Man Walking"	4:37
11.	"For the Fight"	3:20
12.	"Blonde Girls All Look the Same"	2:42
13.	"Serpents or Disciples" (Japanese bonus track)	4:20
Total length:		49:17

== Personnel ==
Butcher Babies

- Heidi Shepherd – vocals
- Carla Harvey – vocals
- Jason Klein – bass
- Henry Flury – guitar
- Chrissy Warner – drums

Production

- Logan Mader – production

== Charts ==
Chart (2015)	Peak position
Belgian Albums (Ultratop Flanders)	177
