= Butcher Babies =

American metal band

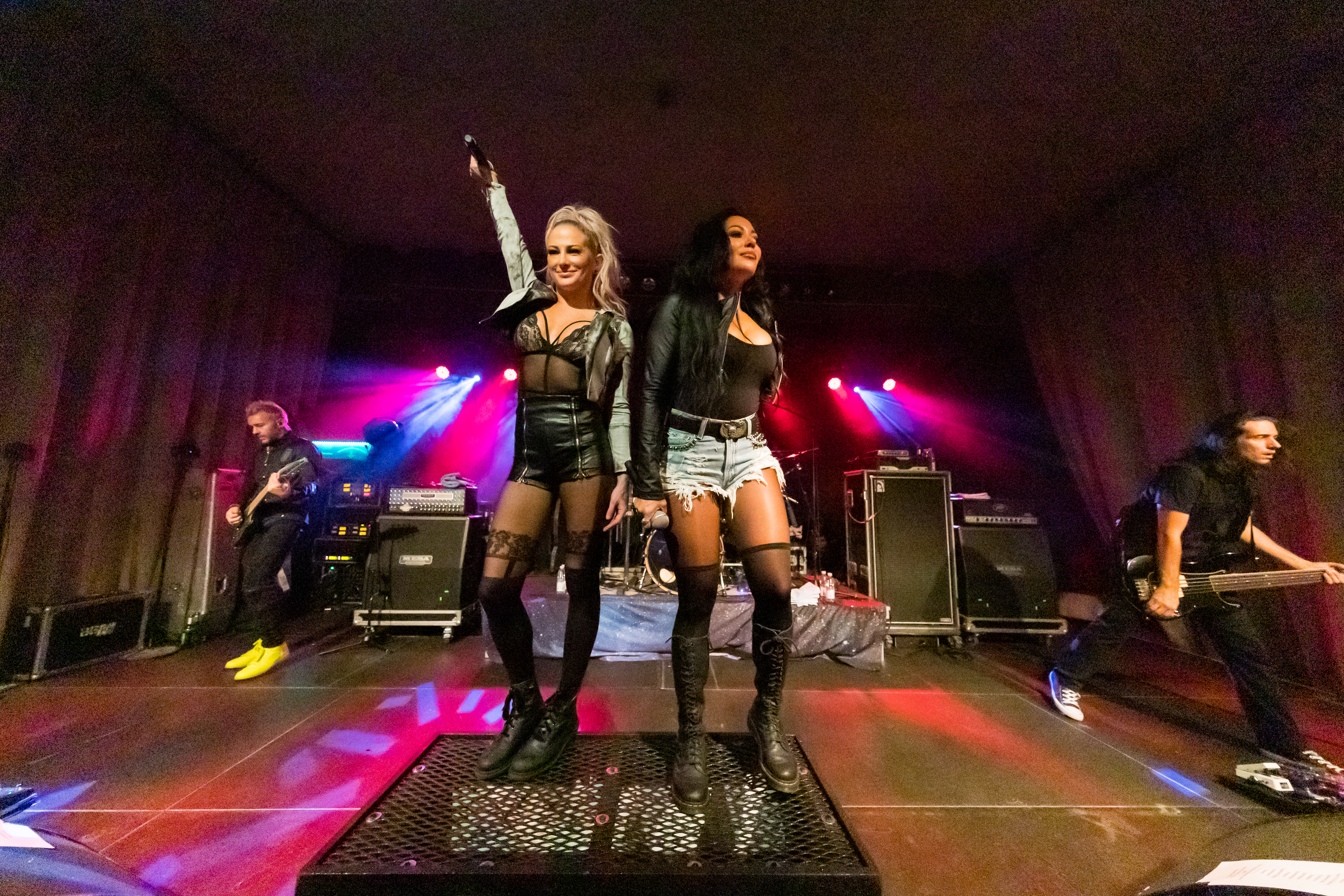
- Butcher Babies performing in Mannheim in 2018

Background information
- Origin: Los Angeles, California, U.S.
- Genres: Metalcore, groove metal, thrash metal, alternative metal
- Years active: 2010–present
- Labels: Century Media; Blood Blast Distribution; Judge & Jury
- Members: Heidi Shepherd; Henry Flury; Dave Nickles
- Past members: Carla Harvey; Chris Warner; Jason Klein; Chase Brickenden; Blake Bailey; Ricky Bonazza
- Website: butcherbabies.com

Butcher Babies is an American heavy metal band from Los Angeles, consisting of frontwoman Heidi Shepherd, guitarist Henry Flury, and drummer Dave Nickles. Their debut album, Goliath, was released on July 9, 2013, via Century Media Records. It sold 3,300 copies in the US during its first week of release and charted at No. 3 on the Billboard Heatseeker chart and No. 112 on the Billboard 200.

== History ==
=== First release and rise (2011–2012) ===
The Butcher Babies were formed in 2010 by vocalists Heidi Shepherd and Carla Harvey. The band self-released their first EP in 2011. In July 2011, they released a comic book at San Diego Comic-Con on July 23 and 24. The comic book was written by Harvey and illustrated by Anthony Winn.

On January 6, 2012, the Butcher Babies premiered a new song, "Mr. Slowdeath". On May 24, they released their first music video for "Mr. Slowdeath", which was produced by Mudrock (Avenged Sevenfold, Godsmack), which is from the band's self-released EP.

=== Goliath (2013–2014) ===
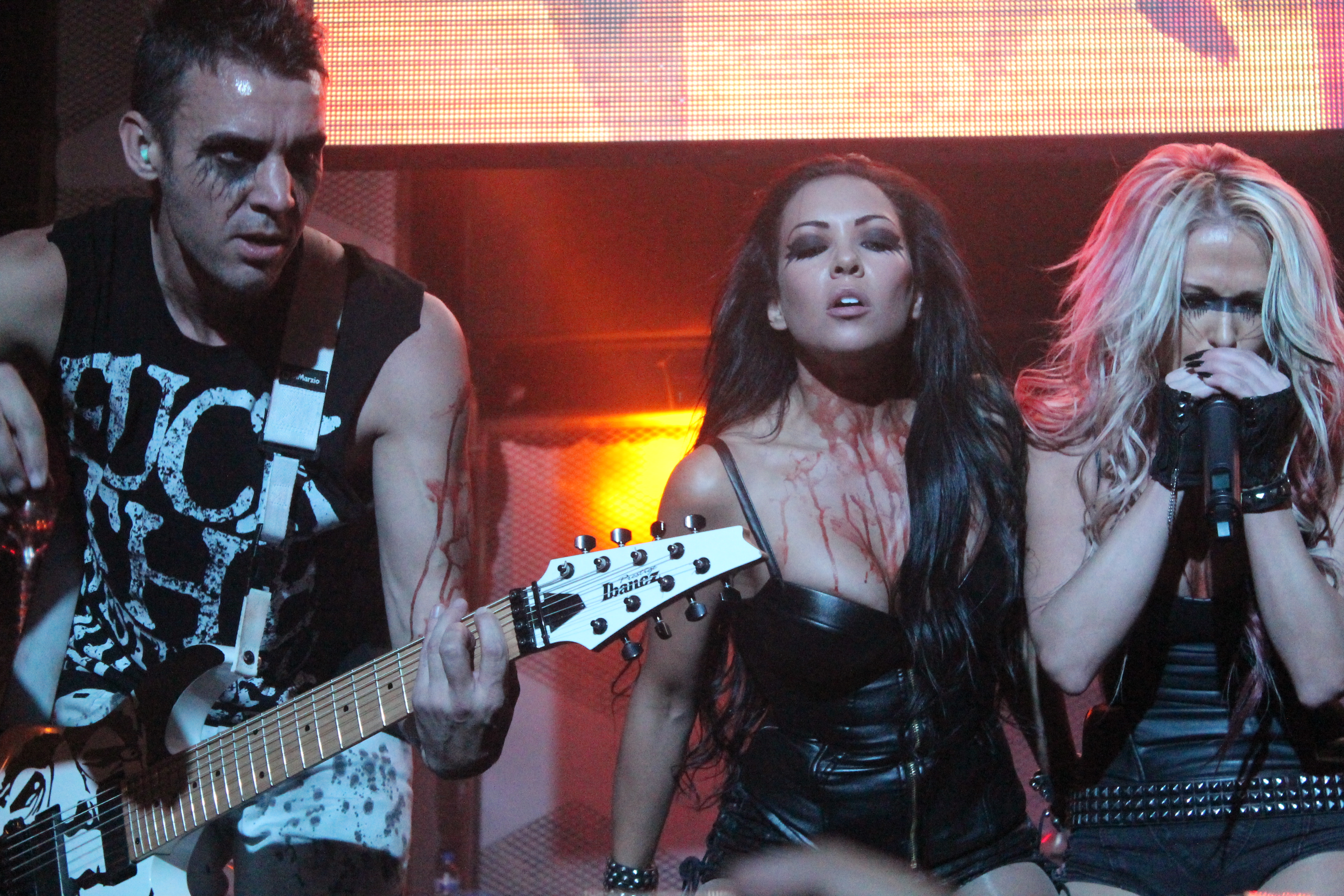
Butcher Babies performing in 2014

The band signed a worldwide deal with Century Media Records in November 2012, and a month later embarked on a North American tour from January to February with Marilyn Manson. The band recorded their debut album, Goliath, in LA.

On June 6, the band released the street single off their debut album "I Smell A Massacre". On June 20, the band streamed another song titled "The Deathsurround". On July 9, the band released their debut album Goliath via Century Media Records. During the first week of sales, the album sold 3,300 copies in the United States which landed it at No. 112 on The Billboard 200 chart.

The Butcher Babies toured on the Rockstar Energy Drink Mayhem Festival 2013 on the Jägermeister Stage and then toured with Danzig along with Texas Hippie Coalition, and A Pale Horse Named Death.

On July 26, In an interview with Artisan News, Shepherd and Harvey spoke about their decision to ditch the nipple-tape look during their live performances. Their appearance over the course of the last six years consisted of this look as an ode to the late Wendy O. Williams. However, they claimed that the message of creativity and individualism had been received and it was time to evolve to another look.

In early 2014, the band took part in The Hell Pop Tour II headlined by In This Moment with additional support from Devour the Day, All Hail the Yeti, and Before the Mourning.

=== Take It Like a Man (2014–2016) ===
On November 5, 2014, the band announced that they had begun work on their upcoming second studio album. The band completed work on the album on April 3, 2015. The band revealed that the album was a return to their thrash metal roots whereas Goliath was more melodic. The band also revealed the new album will feature a re-recorded version of their first single from 2010, "Blonde Girls All Look the Same".

On June 10, 2015, the band revealed the title of their upcoming album to be Take It Like a Man, and also released the first single of the album, "Monsters Ball", despite original plans to release 'Never Go Back" as the lead single. The band revealed that the record label and management expressed dislike for the album title and artwork, and that the band had to fight to keep them. Regarding the album title, vocalist Carla Harvey said:

We all come from different places and backgrounds, but every member of this band had to fight to be the person he or she is today. That's the whole basis for the record. It's not a gender thing. It's the inner strength you have to find in order to pull your boots up and keep moving forward, whatever the situation may be.

On June 26, the band released a music video for the lead single, "Monsters Ball". On July 11, the band released the song "Never Go Back" as the second single of the album.

=== Lilith (2017) ===
In October 2016, following the departure of original drummer, Chris Warner, Butcher Babies introduced their new drummer Chase Brickenden after he filled in on the band's tour with Megadeth. The band's third studio album Lilith was released on October 27, 2017. The album cover art and insert panel was designed by American artist Justin Paul.

=== Eye for an Eye… / …'Til the Worlds Blind (2019–2023) ===
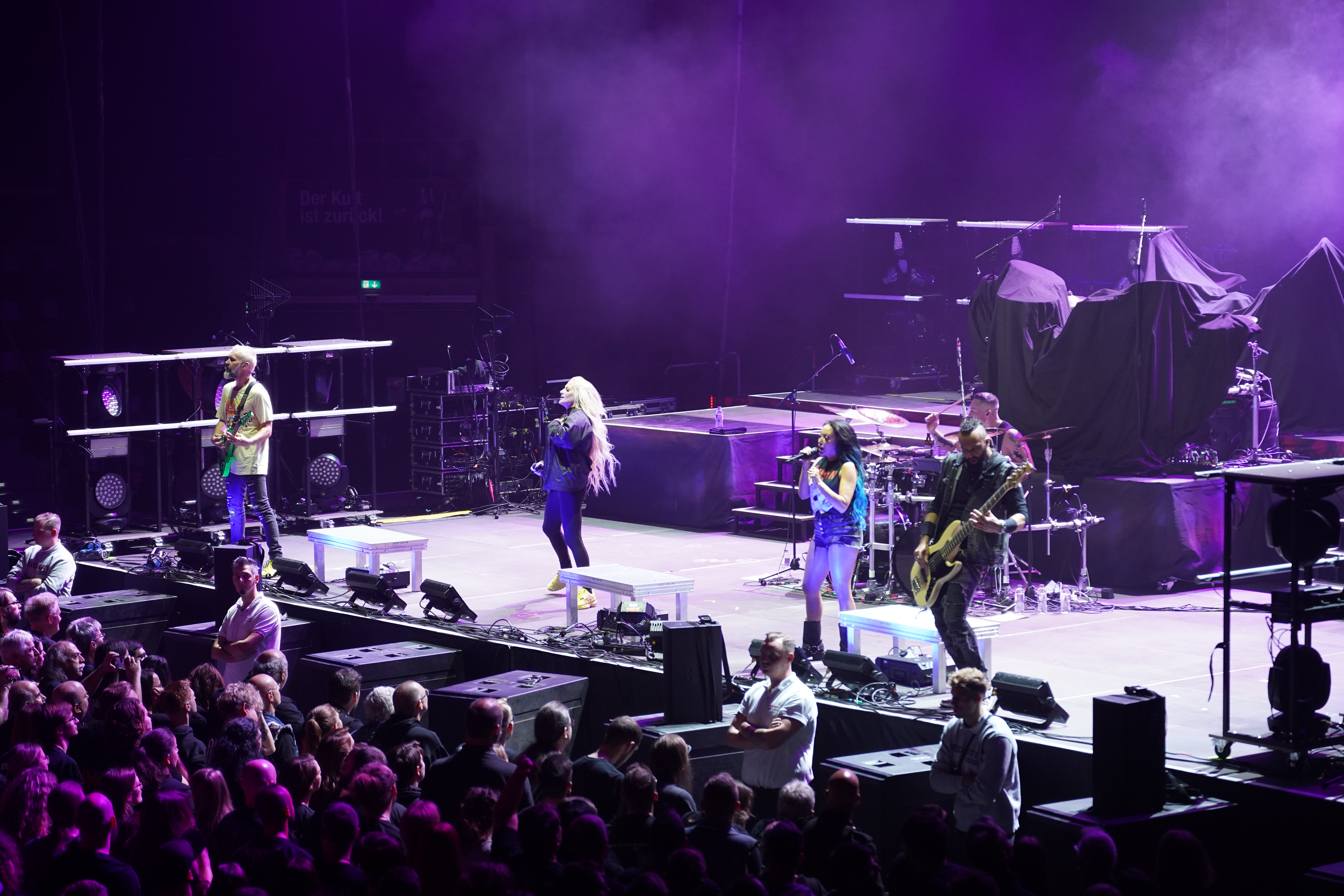
Butcher Babies performing in Germany, 2022

On January 22, 2019, Butcher Babies posted a black and white slogan and pictures with possible titles of songs in the upcoming fourth album on their instagram page @butcherbabies. However, no further release details were provided.

On October 30, 2020, Butcher Babies released a new song called "Bottom of the Bottle" followed by 'Sleeping with the Enemy' which was release later that year on December 11.

The band released further singles during 2021 with 'Yorktown' on February 12, 'Last Dance' on April 7 and 'It's Killin' Time, Baby!' on August 27.

On October 28, 2022, the band released another single 'Best Friend', (a cover originally performed by the artist Saweeti) followed by 'Beaver Cage', 'Red Thunder' and 'Last December' released on February 10, May 12 and June 9, 2023, respectively.

On July 7, 2023, the band released their fourth album, which came in the format of a double album titled 'Eye for an Eye… / …'Til the World's Blind'.

=== Harvey's departure and Nightbloom (2023–present) ===
The band performed their 2023 European tour with Fear Factory without Harvey, who abstained from the tour due to a retinal detachment surgery. She eventually announced her full departure from the band in 2024, leaving Shepherd as the sole vocalist; Harvey would initially attribute her depature to her new-found focus on her career in deathcare as the deciding factor, but would later state that she was "squeezed out" of the band. The band released their first single Sincerity without Harvey in November.

On August 18, 2026, the band announced their sixth album, Nightbloom, which will be released on October 2.

== Musical style and influences ==
Butcher Babies' music has been described as groove metal, thrash metal, metalcore, and alternative metal. The band has cited artists and bands such as Pantera, Guns N' Roses, Marilyn Manson, Slayer, and Slipknot as their influences. However, the band Plasmatics had the biggest influence on the band. In an interview, they stated "We are big fans of Wendy O. Williams. We took the name from the Plasmatics Song "Butcher Baby". Wendy was a bad ass… she didn't give a fuck what anyone thought… we share that spirit". In an interview with Revolver Magazine, Harvey said: "As a biracial kid growing up in the Detroit area, I got a lot of shit for loving hard rock and metal, and seeing musicians that were also African American playing the music I loved made me strong enough to say, "Fuck you, I'm going to like what I want." While Shepherd had said "My heroes are Slipknot, Wendy O. Williams, Gwen Stefani, and Joan Jett. Most of them being females that defy the male dominance in music!" They also stated in an interview, they are heavily influenced by horror films such as The Texas Chain Saw Massacre, House of 1000 Corpses, and The Devil's Rejects.

In an interview from the Rockstar Mayhem Festival, Shepherd stated that she is very influenced by Slipknot, while Harvey stated that she is heavily into old school metal such as Slayer and Iron Maiden, Klein's favorite band is Cannibal Corpse, and Flury's favorite is Meshuggah. Butcher Babies are influenced by the nu metal genre.

The Butcher Babies are known for their aggressive stage appeal, such as wearing nipple tape in the earlier years of their career. This attire is heavily influenced by Wendy O. Williams of the Plasmatics. Shepherd stated in an interview that "Wendy O. Williams was the first female in heavy metal. She had that single, 'Butcher Baby', hence the name BUTCHER BABIES, and she was the first female to just really go all out. She didn't care what anyone told her. She was going to be the performer she wanted to be without anyone telling her 'No'. We were both hugely influenced by her, and that's where the attire came from."

After Harvey's departure, the band's sound was noted to have gotten more melodic.

== Band members ==
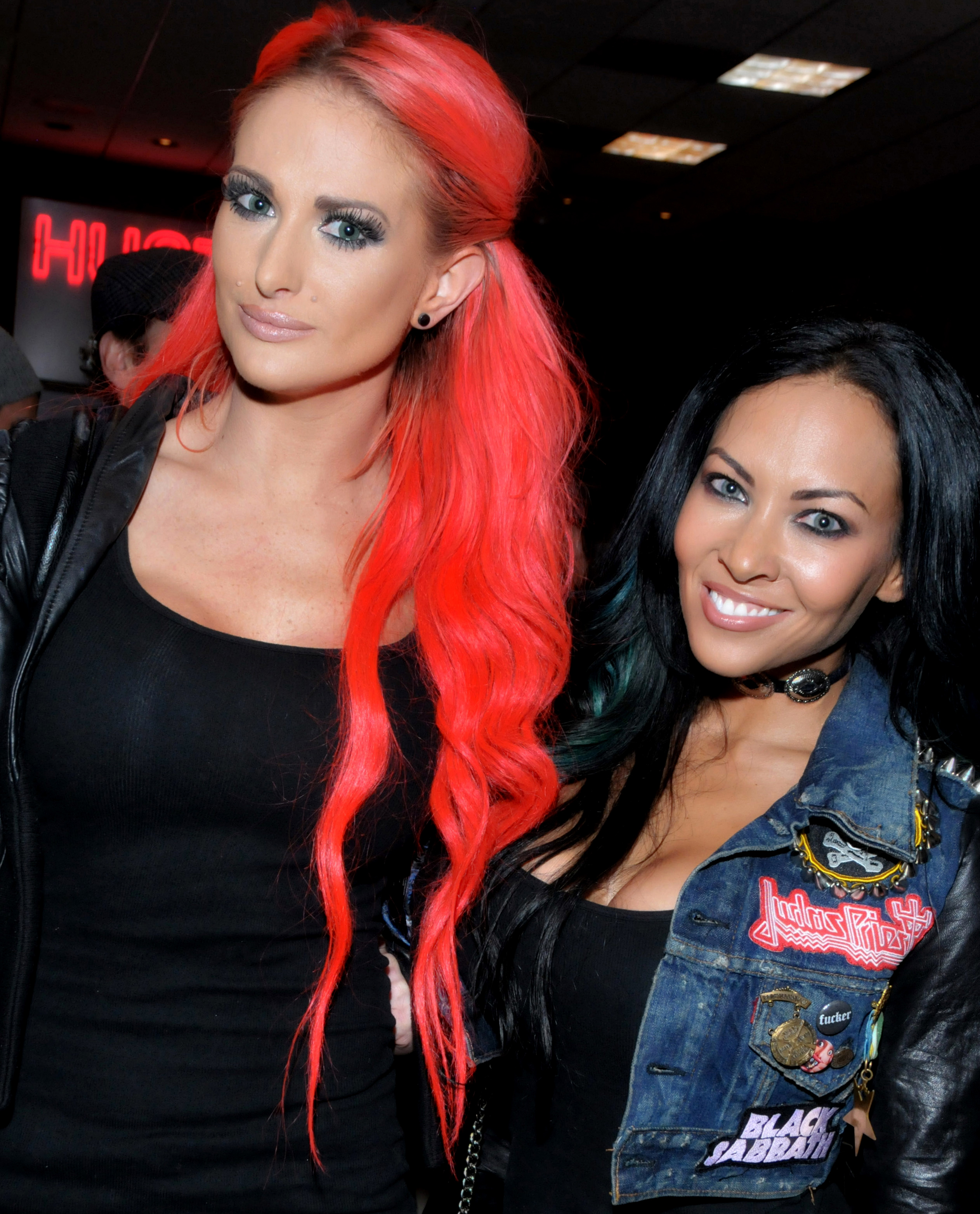
Heidi Shepherd (left) and Carla Harvey in 2014

=== Current members ===
- Heidi Shepherd – vocals (2010–present)
- Henry Flury – guitars (2010–present)
- Dave Nickles – drums (2024–present)
- Sean Violet – bass (2026–present)

=== Former members ===
- Carla Harvey – vocals (2010–2024)
- Jason Klein – bass (2010–2019)
- Chris Warner – drums (2010–2017)
- Chase Brickenden – drums (2017–2023)
- Ricky Bonazza – bass (2020–2026)
- Blake Bailey – drums (2023)

== Discography ==
=== Studio albums ===
Title	Album details	Peak chart positions					Sales
Title	Album details	US	US Heat	US Indep	US Hard Rock	US Rock	Sales
Goliath	Released: July 9, 2013; Label: Century Media Records; Formats: CD, digital download	112	3	24	12	31	US: 10,925+
Take It Like a Man	Released: August 21, 2015; Label: Century Media Records; Formats: CD, digital download	76	—	5	8	13	
Lilith	Released: October 27, 2017; Label: Century Media Records; Formats: CD, digital download	—	—	11	15	43	
Eye for an Eye... / ...'Til the World's Blind	Released: July 7, 2023; Label: Century Media Records; Formats: CD, digital download	—	—	—	—	—	
Nightbloom	Released: October 2, 2026; Label: Judge & Jury Records; Formats: CD, digital download	—	—	—	—	—	
"—" denotes a recording that did not chart or was not released in that territory.

=== EPs ===
Title	Album details
Butcher Babies	Released: May 29, 2012; Label: Self-released; Formats: CD, digital download
Uncovered	Released: September 30, 2014; Label: Century Media Records; Formats: CD, digital download
Insincerity	Released: October 28, 2025; Label: Judge & Jury Records; Formats: Digital download

Singles

- "Never Go Back": #39 US Mainstream Rock
- "Blame It On the Wind": #32 US Mainstream Rock

=== Music videos ===
Year	Title	Director	Album
2012	"Mr. Slowdeath"	Davo MusicMediaGroup.tv	Butcher Babies
2013	"Magnolia Blvd"	Daniel Andres Gomez Bagby	Goliath
2014	"I Smell a Massacre"	Davo MusicMediaGroup.tv	Goliath
2014	"They're Coming to Take Me Away Ha-Haa!"	Unknown	Uncovered
2015	"Monsters Ball"	Dan Dobi	Take It Like a Man
2015	"For the Fight"	Mike Gevorgian	Take It Like a Man
2015	"Igniter"	Unknown	Take It Like a Man
2017	"Lilith"	Strati Hovartos	Lilith
2017	"Headspin"	Brian Cox	Lilith
2017	"Look What We've Done"	Matthew Vietch	Lilith
2017	"The Huntsman" (Visualizer)	Justin Paul	Lilith
2020	"Bottom of a Bottle"	Heidi Shepherd	Eye for an Eye...
2021	"Sleeping with the Enemy"	Ron Thunderwood	Eye for an Eye...
2021	"Yorktown"	Aaron Sorensen	Eye for an Eye...
2022	"Best Friend"	Dale "Rage" Resteghini	...'Til the World's Blind
2023	"Beaver Cage"	Heidi Shepherd & Steve Romano	...'Til the World's Blind
2023	"Red Thunder"	Heidi Shepherd	...'Til the World's Blind
2024	"Sincerity"	Heidi Shepherd & Henry Flury	NIGHTBLOOM
2025	"Sincerity (I Know I Wasn't Perfect)"	Heidi Shepherd & Henry Flury	Insincerity
2025	"Sincerity (You Fooled Me Twice)"	Heidi Shepherd & Henry Flury	Insincerity
2026	"Lost In Your Touch"	Heidi Shepherd	NIGHTBLOOM
2026	"CANNIBAL"	Tony Aguilera	MEDUSA
2026	"Black Dove"	Heidi Shepherd	NIGHTBLOOM
2026	"Blame It On The Wind"	Heidi Shepherd	NIGHTBLOOM
