= Stormtroopers of Death =

American crossover thrash band

Background information
- Also known as: S.O.D.
- Origin: New York City, U.S.
- Genres: Thrash metal; hardcore punk; crossover thrash; comedy metal
- Years active: 1985–1986, 1992, 1997–2002, 2007
- Labels: Megaforce; Nuclear Blast
- Spinoffs: M.O.D.
- Spinoff of: Anthrax
- Past members: Scott Ian; Charlie Benante; Dan Lilker; Billy Milano

Stormtroopers of Death (abbreviated to S.O.D.) was an American crossover thrash band formed in New York City in 1985. They are credited as being amongst the first crossover thrash groups by fusing hardcore punk with thrash metal. The band is also known for reuniting Anthrax guitarist Scott Ian and drummer Charlie Benante with their former bassist Dan Lilker. Their instrumental song "March of the S.O.D." from their 1985 debut album, Speak English or Die, was the Headbangers Ball intro anthem for many years. Another song from the same album, "Chromatic Death", was also used during the show as a segue between ads and videos.

The band was controversial due to their deliberately offensive explicit lyrics. Ian described the songs on Speak English Or Die as "ridiculous" and "just a big inside joke", adding: "Some people thought we were racist, and those people are stupid." Bassist Dan Lilker stated: "The lyrics were never intended to be serious, just to piss people off." The band had several periods of inactivity following their formation in 1985. According to singer Billy Milano, the 24-song extended play of live and unreleased material called Rise of the Infidels, released in August 2007 by Megaforce Records, "will finally be the last of S.O.D.", laying to rest rumors of another reunion.

== History ==
=== Speak English or Die and first hiatus (1985–1991) ===
After finishing his guitar tracks on Anthrax's second album Spreading the Disease, Scott Ian would draw pictures of an undead, cigar-chomping G.I. known as "Sargent D". The pictures would be accompanied by slogans such as "I'm not racist; I hate everyone" and "Speak English or Die", and Ian would write lyrics about the character. He decided to form a hardcore band based on Sargent D (which was also used as the mascot of), so he recruited Anthrax drummer Charlie Benante, ex-Anthrax bassist Dan Lilker, and Psychos bassist Billy Milano on vocals.

They recorded a 63-song demo called Crab Society North and set to work on an album for Johnny Zazula's Megaforce Records. The album, titled Speak English or Die, was recorded and mixed over three days, and has since been hailed as a landmark album that was among the first to fuse hardcore punk with thrash metal. They toured in support of the album in 1985, opening for Motörhead and The Plasmatics, among others. Their music served as the theme of the 1980s incarnation of MTV's Headbangers Ball. They planned a follow-up titled USA For S.O.D., which was ultimately scrapped and never recorded.

After their tour ended, Lilker carried on with the band Nuclear Assault while Benante and Ian continued with Anthrax. Milano formed the spin-off band Method of Destruction, known as M.O.D. The band's first album U.S.A. for M.O.D., featured many lyrics written by Scott Ian, as well as an altered version of "Aren't You Hungry", an unrecorded S.O.D. song played during their 1985 tour.

=== Reunions and Bigger Than the Devil (1992–2002) ===
S.O.D. reformed for a one-off gig in New York City in 1992, which was recorded and released as the live album Live at Budokan. The record featured most songs from the Speak English or Die album, a few songs from the demo and covers of Ministry, Nirvana and Fear. In 1996, S.O.D. reunited to play opposite Biohazard at Irving Plaza, in New York City, for a benefit for Dana Cavalera, to solve his murder. In 1997, S.O.D. reunited again to play the Milwaukee Metal Fest. They played their first European gig at the With Full Force festival in Germany, and in 1999 they released their second studio album, titled Bigger Than the Devil. Its hardcore metal and black humor was welcomed by fans and the band toured again in the late 1990s. Bigger Than the Devil featured the original S.O.D. version of "Aren't You Hungry".

In 2001, the DVD/video Speak English or Live was released. It added to the original Live at Budokan video by including a gig from a German metal festival and footage of the band recording overdubs for live tracks recorded in Japan. These would be included on the platinum reissue of Speak English or Die, along with two new studio tracks, to celebrate one million copies of Speak English or Die sold. In 2002, the concert film Kill Yourself: The Movie was released on DVD. The footage in it from the “Ronnie Dobbs Entitilitus Foundation Benefit” was recorded at the Maritime Hall in San Francisco on Friday, November 12, 1999.

=== Second breakup and subsequent activities (2003–present) ===
Heavy metal news outlets reported in 2003 that the band had split up due to disagreements between Ian and Milano. In 2007, however, S.O.D. reconvened and released its third album, Rise of the Infidels. The album consists of previously unrecorded material and live recordings. However, Milano said that the album would be the band's final release.

In October 2011, Scott Ian was asked by UnRatd Magazine if there was any chance of another reunion, to which he replied:

"No. I think I can safely say that, yeah. It was never supposed to be any thing more than it was. As far as I'm concerned we did too much with it. It started out as a comic book strip that I drew in the studio and then turned into this record that we made, but you know, that's all that it is for me. It's the opposite of The Damned Things (a supergroup featuring Ian alongside members of Fall Out Boy and Every Time I Die), for me, it was never meant to be a real band with a schedule and making records and touring. S.O.D. was supposed to be the 'anti' of that, it was supposed to just be about having fun and never having it turn into something real where all of a sudden it's not just fun anymore – it becomes a job, it becomes a business. And I'm glad everyone around the world got to see it at least once because in '99 and 2000 we played everywhere and I don't feel the need to go out and do that again."

In December 2012, it was announced that Billy Milano and Dan Lilker had reunited in a new band called United Forces.

In July 2015, Horns Up Rocks reported that S.O.D. would reunite again in celebration of their 30th anniversary. However, bassist Dan Lilker said that there were no plans for an S.O.D. reunion, and added that Billy Milano did not "consult anybody else that played in S.O.D. He just kind of announced something."

In 2017, Lilker formed a new version of S.O.D. under the name Not S.O.D. – Fist Banging Maniacs, with Brazilian musicians João Gordo, Cléber Orsioli and Guilherme Cersosimo filling in for Milano, Ian and Benante respectively.

In April 2020, Benante posted video of himself along with Ian and Lilker on YouTube performing S.O.D. songs during the COVID-19 lockdown.

In May 2020, Benante, Ian and Lilker, along with Mike Patton on vocals, posted a video on YouTube of "Speak Spanish or Die".

In February 2025, it was announced that a Stormtroopers of Death tribute would headline the Milwaukee Metal Fest on May 16, 2025, with Scott Ian on guitar, Dan Lilker on bass, and Scott Ian's son Revel Ian on drums and Hatebreed's Jamey Jasta on vocals.

== Legacy ==
Speak English or Die is widely regarded as one of the first and most influential crossover thrash albums, and the band are regarded as pioneers of the genre along with D.R.I., Corrosion of Conformity, and Suicidal Tendencies. The band's influence extends beyond crossover; Al Jourgensen, frontman of industrial metal band Ministry, was inspired by Speak English or Die to add thrash metal to his band's music starting with 1989's The Mind Is a Terrible Thing to Taste. He adds that Speak English or Die is "one of the best records ever." The group would later cover "United Forces" for their 2012 album Relapse.

Additionally, Scott Ian once recalled that Eddie Vedder was so impacted by the album that he, "cornered me one night at a party for 25 minutes telling me this story about the first time he heard Speak English Or Die and how it affected his life."

Furthermore, songs on Speak English or Die - such as "Milk," - have been observed as containing some of the first blast beats. Drummer Charlie Benante has commented on this, saying, "The thing was something that had been around the NY hardcore scene for ages but hadn't been used for other things. The first time it really happened was on S.O.D's 'Milk' song, so I guess you could say I had a lot to do with it. Now a lot of bands are using it and doing it really well."

== Band members ==
- Scott Ian – guitars, backing vocals
- Charlie Benante – drums, additional guitar solos
- Dan Lilker – bass, backing vocals
- Billy Milano – lead vocals

== Discography ==
=== Demo albums ===
- Crab Society North (1985)

=== Studio albums ===
- Speak English or Die (1985)
- Bigger than the Devil (1999)
- Rise of the Infidels (2007)

=== Live albums ===
- Live at Budokan (1992)

=== Singles ===
- "March of the S.O.D." (1985)
- "Seasoning the Obese" (1999)

=== Other appearances ===
- From the Megavault (1985)
- Deeper into the Vault (1991)
- Crossover (1993)
- Stars on Thrash (1998)
- Suburban Open Air '99 (1999)
- Death Is Just the Beginning, Vol. 5 (1999)
- Dynamit Vol. 16 (1999)
- Nuclear Blast Soundcheck Series, Vol. 18 (1999)
- A Tribute to the Scorpions (2000)
- Death Is Just the Beginning, Vol. 6 (2000)
- New York's Hardest, Vol. 3 (2001)
- Death Is Just the Beginning, Vol. 7 (2002)

=== Videos ===
Year	Title	Label
1992	S.O.D. Live at Budokan (VHS)	Megaforce Entertainment
January 23, 2001	Kill Yourself: The Movie (DVD or VHS)	Nuclear Blast Records
September 25, 2001	Speak English or Live (DVD)	Megaforce Entertainment
July 26, 2005	20 Years of Dysfunction	Nuclear Blast Records
