= Carla Harvey =

American singer

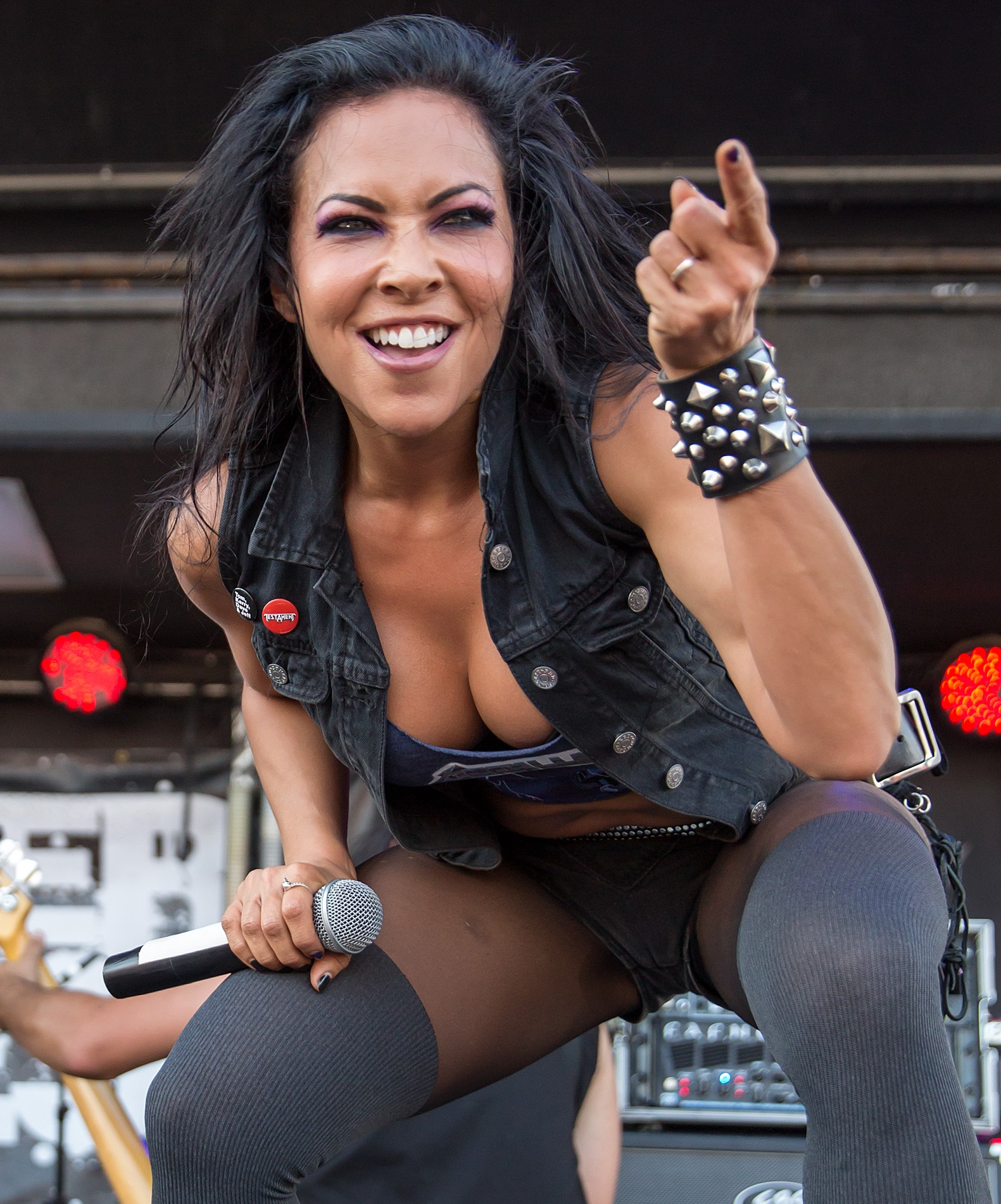
- Harvey in 2014

Background information
- Born: October 4, 1976 (age 50); Detroit, Michigan, U.S.
- Genres: Metalcore; groove metal; thrash metal; alternative metal
- Occupations: Singer; songwriter; television personality; author
- Years active: 2010–present
- Member of: Lords of Acid; Violent Hour
- Formerly of: Butcher Babies

Carla Harvey (born October 4, 1976) is an American musician, best known as a former co-vocalist of the metal band Butcher Babies. She landed her first job in Hollywood as an entertainment reporter for the Playboy Channel, and appeared on many popular network TV shows like Rules of Engagement. Harvey took a break from the entertainment world to earn a degree in Mortuary Science from California's Cypress College, and she worked as an embalmer and funeral director.

Harvey is passionate about writing. She was named a "comic book mastermind" by Hustler. Her first published comic book Butcher Babies was released with great success at San Diego Comic-Con 2011. Her first full-length novel, Death and Other Dances, was released in 2014, and a new comic series entitled Soul Sucka was released in 2015.

== Biography ==
Harvey is of Irish-Ethiopian descent through her father and of Finnish-Italian descent through her mother. She had a sister named Julia, who was born with microcephaly and died from it at a young age. Harvey attended Glenn Levey Middle School in Southfield, Michigan. As a teenager, she attended Mercy High School (all-girl private Catholic) and Harrison High School, both in Farmington Hills, Michigan. Carla also has a degree in mortuary science from California's Cypress College, was Valedictorian and earned a degree in Mortuary Business from Mid America College of Funeral Service and is a licensed funeral director and embalmer as well as a grief coach. In an interview, she said that "She hopes to one day open her own funeral home, but for now, she's enjoying life on the road with the Butcher Babies."

On July 20, 2024, Harvey announced her departure from Butcher Babies. After departing Butcher Babies in July 2024, Harvey announced the forming of her new band, The Violent Hour.

On January 3rd, 2025, Lords of Acid announced that Harvey had joined the band.

== Musical influences ==
Harvey has cited her influences as Pantera, Slayer, Metallica, Black Sabbath, Iron Maiden, Slipknot, and the Plasmatics. However, in an interview, she has stated that her main musical heroes are Slash and Jimi Hendrix. She said: "As a biracial kid growing up in the Detroit area, I got a lot of shit for loving hard rock and metal, and seeing musicians that were also African American playing the music I loved made me strong enough to say, 'Fuck you, I'm going to like what I want.'" She is also heavily influenced by horror movies such as The Texas Chain Saw Massacre, House of 1000 Corpses, and The Devil's Rejects.

== Personal life ==
In 2015, Harvey started dating Charlie Benante, the drummer of American thrash metal band Anthrax. Harvey married Benante in a ceremony officiated by Gene Simmons on October 12, 2025.

== Discography ==
=== With Butcher Babies ===
- Blonde Girls All Look the Same (Single) (2011)
- Butcher Babies (EP) (2012)
- Goliath (2013)
- Uncovered (EP) (2014)
- Take It Like a Man (2015)
- Lilith (2017)
- Eye for an Eye…/…'Till the World's Blind (2023)

=== With Lords of Acid ===
- Mundo Bizarro (2026)
