= Speak English or Die =

Studio album by Stormtroopers of Death
- Released: August 30, 1985
- Recorded: July 2–3, 1985
- Studio: Pyramid (Ithaca, New York)
- Genres: Thrash metal; crossover thrash
- Length: 28:41
- Label: Megaforce
- Producers: Alex Perialas and Scott Ian

Stormtroopers of Death chronology
Crab Society North (1985)	Speak English or Die (1985)	Live at Budokan (1992)

Speak English or Die is the debut album by the American crossover thrash band Stormtroopers of Death, released on August 30, 1985.

Parts of the songs "March of the S.O.D.", "Milano Mosh", "Chromatic Death" and "Sargent D and the S.O.D." were used for commercial breaks of MTV's Headbangers Ball in the early 1990s.

"March of the S.O.D." was the Headbangers Ball intro anthem for many years.

It is considered to be an essential release in the genre by Revolver.

== Composition ==
After Anthrax finished recording Spreading the Disease, there was still some studio time left, so members Scott Ian and Charlie Benante called some friends, practiced some songs, and recorded it all within a week.

Many point to this album – and particularly the song "Milk" – as one of the first songs to feature a blast beat, courtesy of Benante. When asked in 2009 if he invented the blast beat, Benante replied, "If you mean that I decided to sit in my room and invent it, no it wasn't like that. The thing was something that had been around the NY hardcore scene for ages but hadn't been used for other things. The first time it really happened was on S.O.D's 'Milk' song, so I guess you could say I had a lot to do with it. Now a lot of bands are using it and doing it really well."

The album had some controversy due to the lyrics, which addressed homosexuality, women and foreign cultures. Dan Lilker stated, "The lyrics were never intended to be serious, just to piss people off."

In an interview with Songfacts in 2014, when asked "If Speak English or Die came out today, do you think that because of the political correctness of today, it would go over the same?", Lilker responded, "It probably would have had a harder time just because people seem to be more uptight now. Nevertheless, it was what it was, which is saying it is what it is, but back then. And I don't regret it. Maybe minor aspects went overboard with certain lyrical things, but then again, we didn't really mean them. Perhaps if people realize that, then it's just more funny."

== Reception ==
Professional ratings
Review scores
Source	Rating
Allmusic	4.5/5 stars
Punk News	5/5 stars
Ultimate Guitar	9/10

Speak English or Die was well received and is considered one of the greatest and most influential crossover thrash albums of all time, according to sources such as Punk News and Ultimate Guitar. Allmusic gave the album 4.5 stars out of 5 and said, "S.O.D.'s Speak English or Die was an important record in the fusion of hardcore punk with thrash and speed metal".

Speak English or Die has sold over one million copies worldwide.

In 2009 the album was inducted into the Decibel Hall of Fame.

== Legacy ==
The album was re-released by Megaforce in August 1995 and a platinum edition of the album was released in February 2000.

In August 2014, Revolver placed Speak English or Die on its "14 Thrash Albums You Need to Own" list.

Al Jourgensen, frontman of industrial metal band Ministry, describes Speak English or Die as an influential album that inspired him to add thrash metal guitar riffs to his band's music starting with 1989's The Mind Is a Terrible Thing to Taste. He adds that Speak English or Die is "one of the best records ever." The group would later cover "United Forces" for their 2012 album Relapse.

Scott Ian once recalled that Eddie Vedder was a fan of the album as well, saying he "cornered me one night at a party for 25 minutes telling me this story about the first time he heard Speak English Or Die and how it affected his life."

There were also plans for a Speak English or Die tribute album featuring multiple artists during the late 1990s; however, the release never materialized.

== Track listing ==
All tracks written by S.O.D.

No.	Title	Length
1.	"March of the S.O.D." (instrumental)	1:27
2.	"Sargent D and the S.O.D."	2:23
3.	"Kill Yourself"	2:11
4.	"Milano Mosh"	1:32
5.	"Speak English or Die"	2:24
6.	"United Forces"	1:53
7.	"Chromatic Death"	0:43
8.	"Pi Alpha Nu"	1:09
9.	"Anti-Procrastination Song"	0:06
10.	"What's That Noise" (cameo appearance by producer Alex Perialas)	1:00
11.	"Freddy Krueger"	2:32
12.	"Milk"	1:54
13.	"Pre-Menstrual Princess Blues"	1:20
14.	"Pussy Whipped"	2:14
15.	"Fist Banging Mania"	2:04
16.	"No Turning Back"	0:52
17.	"Fuck the Middle East"	0:27
18.	"Douche Crew"	1:35
19.	"Hey Gordy!"	0:07
20.	"Ballad of Jimi Hendrix"	0:05
21.	"Diamonds and Rust (Extended Version)"	0:02

=== 1992 re-issue bonus track ===
22. "Ram It Up" – 1:21 (Inferno cover)

=== 2000 re-issue bonus studio tracks ===
22. "Identity" – 2:50
23. "Go" – 1:07

=== 2000 re-issue live bonus tracks recorded in Tokyo, 1999 ===
24. "March of the S.O.D."/"Sargent D and the S.O.D." – 4:25
25. "Kill Yourself" – 4:08
26. "Milano Mosh" – 2:09
27. "Speak English or Die" – 4:31
28. "Fuck the Middle East"/"Douche Crew" – 3:11
29. "Not"/"Momo"/"Taint"/"The Camel Boy"/"Diamonds and Rust"/"Anti-Procrastination Song" – 1:24
30. "Milk" – 4:08
31. "United Forces Pt. I" – 2:01
32. "United Forces Pt. II" – 2:05
33. "Ram It Up" – 1:22 (Inferno cover) (bonus studio hidden track)

=== 2015 30th anniversary edition bonus track ===
34. "Crab Society North Demos" -14:48

Comparison with bootlegs from this era showed that the live tracks were recorded live at Club Citta in Kawasaki on June 5, 1999, except for "United Forces" part I and II, that were recorded at Club Citta on June 7, 1999. S.O.D. also played on June 8, 1999, at Club Citta, completing a three-night stint at the venue.

The bonus track "Ram It Up" added in reissues was an outtake from the original album sessions that had appeared already in 1985 on the Megaforce From the Megavault compilation. The song is a cover version taken from the Tod und Wahnsinn album (1983) of the German hardcore punk band Inferno.

== Personnel ==
- Billy Milano – lead vocals
- Scott Ian – guitars, backing vocals
- Dan Lilker – bass, backing vocals
- Charlie Benante – drums, guitar solo on "United Forces," cover art
