= Scott Ian =

American guitarist (born 1963)

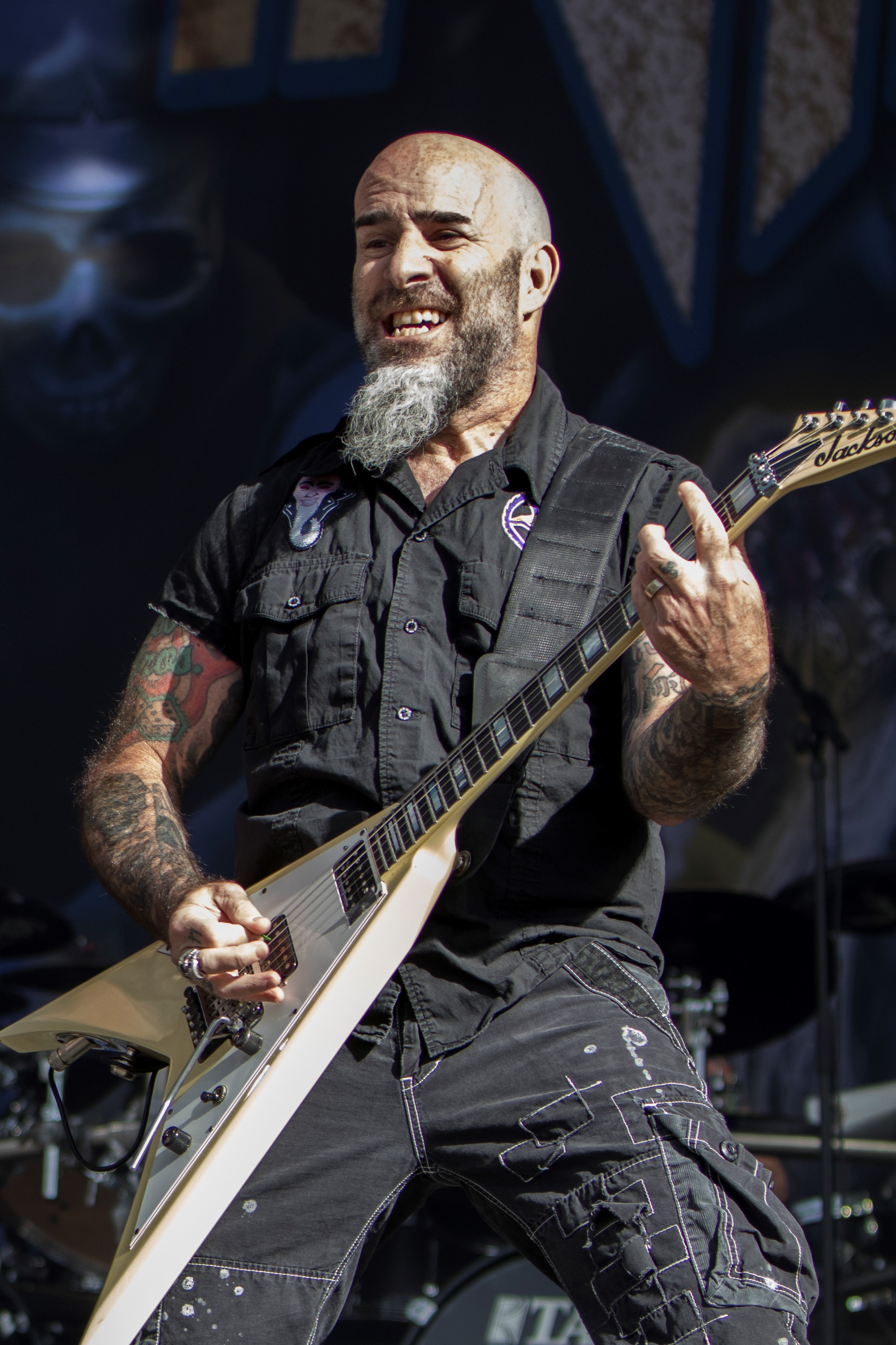
- Ian performing with Anthrax in 2019

Background information
- Born: Scott Ian Rosenfeld; December 31, 1963 (age 62); New York City, U.S.
- Genres: Thrash metal; heavy metal; crossover thrash; hardcore punk
- Occupations: Musician; songwriter
- Instrument: Guitar
- Years active: 1981–present
- Member of: Anthrax; Motor Sister; Mr. Bungle
- Formerly of: S.O.D.; Damnocracy; The Damned Things

Scott Ian (born Scott Ian Rosenfeld, December 31, 1963) is an American musician, best known as the rhythm guitarist, lyricist and co-founder of the thrash metal band Anthrax, of which he is the sole continuous member. Ian is also the guitarist, lyricist, and a founding member of the crossover thrash band Stormtroopers of Death, and is the rhythm guitarist for the metal bands the Damned Things and Mr. Bungle. He has hosted The Rock Show on VH1 and has appeared on VH1's I Love the... series, Heavy: The Story of Metal, and SuperGroup.

== Early life ==
Scott Ian Rosenfeld (his name has since been legally changed to drop his birth surname) was born to a Jewish family in the Bayside section of the New York City borough of Queens; he has a younger brother named Jason (who was the lead vocalist of Anthrax for a brief period in the early 1980s) and a half-brother named Sean. Ian attended Bayside High School, with classmates (and future Anthrax bandmates) Dan Lilker and Neil Turbin, graduating in 1981.

Witnessing Kiss live at Madison Square Garden in 1977 made a huge impact on Ian, who has been vocal about his love for the band (Ian appeared on an episode of Gene Simmons Family Jewels, in which he visited Simmons' home and spoke about the impact Kiss has had on his life). Ian went on to be influenced by British heavy metal bands such as Black Sabbath, Iron Maiden, Motörhead and Judas Priest, as well as the punk rock band Ramones. The musical style of his playing and songwriting including fast alternate picking was also largely influenced by the German metal band Accept.

Ian states that Malcolm Young, Rudolf Schenker, and Johnny Ramone were his biggest influences to pursue rhythm guitar. He learned how to play guitar by listening to AC/DC records such as Powerage and Highway to Hell, he would sit in his room and learn how to play every song on the albums.

== Career ==
=== Anthrax ===
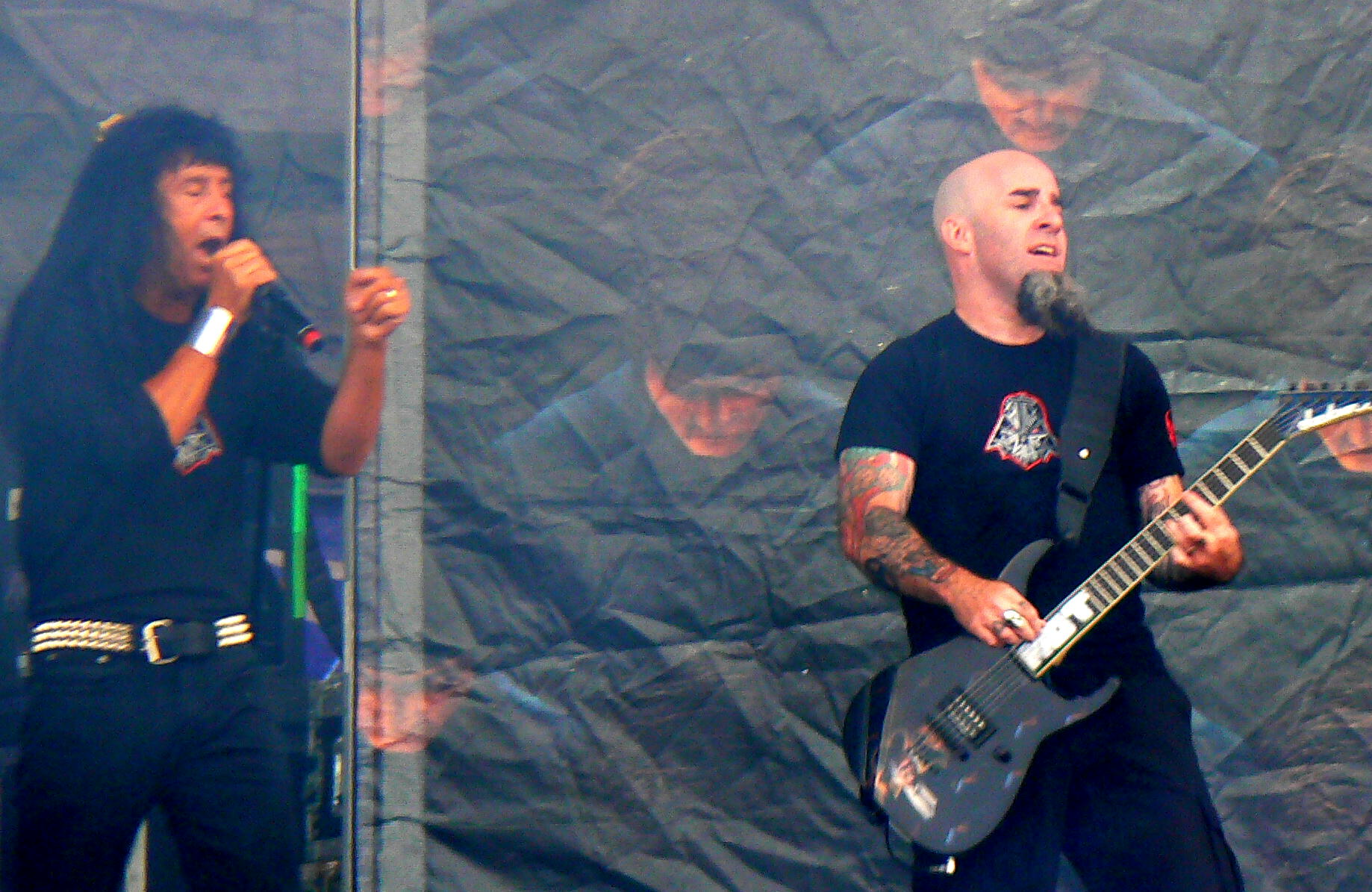
Ian (right) and Joey Belladonna performing with Anthrax in 2010

As a founding member of Anthrax, Ian helped to create thrash metal in the mid-1980s alongside Megadeth, Slayer, and Metallica. He came up with the idea to collaborate with the rap group Public Enemy, covering their song "Bring the Noise" in 1991. This has been considered a foundational recording of the rap/rock genre. In 2005, Ian was invited by Chuck D of Public Enemy to perform "Bring the Noise" with them as part of their induction into VH1's Hip Hop Honors Hall of Fame. He also joined Public Enemy on the Rock the Bells tour in 2007. During his tenure Anthrax has sold over 10 million albums worldwide and have been nominated for six Grammy Awards.

=== Stormtroopers of Death ===
In 1985, Scott Ian co-founded the crossover thrash band Stormtroopers of Death as a satirical take on hardcore punk, recruiting Anthrax drummer Charlie Benante, former Anthrax bassist Dan Lilker, and vocalist Billy Milano. After releasing one album Speak English or Die that same year the band went on a hiatus before briefly coming back from 1997 till 2002.

A Stormtroopers of Death tribute set headlined the Milwaukee Metal Fest on May 16, 2025, with Ian on guitar, Dan Lilker on bass, Ian's son Revel Ian on drums and Hatebreed's Jamey Jasta on vocals.

=== Other ventures ===
Ian began working with music television channel VH1 in 2001, when he was asked to host the program Rock Show. During his 48 episodes as host, he interviewed guests including Ozzy Osbourne, Rob Halford, Ted Nugent, Stone Temple Pilots, Megadeth, 3 Doors Down, Sevendust, Tenacious D, and the Cult. Ian was a regular commentator on various VH1 shows including the I Love the... series, 100 Most Metal Moments, Awesomely Bad Number One Songs, When Metallica Ruled the World, and episodes of VH1's Behind the Music featuring Metallica, Pantera and Anthrax. Ian was prominently featured in VH1's History of Heavy Metal. In June 2006, he starred in the VH1 reality series SuperGroup with Ted Nugent, Sebastian Bach, Jason Bonham and Evan Seinfeld.

Ian plays guitar in the group Pearl (with his wife, Pearl Aday), who toured with Velvet Revolver and Meat Loaf. Pearl's debut album was released on January 19, 2010, through Megaforce Records. Ian performed with Pearl on Jimmy Kimmel Live! on January 20, 2010.

In 2006, Ian joined the supergroup Damnocracy, however the band did not release any albums and disbanded in 2010.

In 2008, DC Comics asked Ian to write a two-issue prestige-format comics series for the character Lobo. Books one and two of Lobo: Highway to Hell were released in November and December 2009.

From 2007 to 2013, Ian hosted / cohosted the annual Kerrang! Awards.

In 2008, Ian signed with UltimateBet, the third largest internet gaming site in the world, as one of their online professional players. He joined professional poker players Phil Hellmuth and Annie Duke as one of Ultimate Bet's star pros. He won Ultimate Bet's premier Sunday 200K tournament and cashed in in 2010's WSOP main event by finishing 634th out of 6494 players.

In 2010, Ian joined the metal supergroup the Damned Things, which released their first album on December 14, 2010. On June 21, 2011, his wife gave birth to the couple's first child, thus forcing Ian to briefly depart from Anthrax's tour. Andreas Kisser of Sepultura filled in for Scott on guitar during Scott's absence.

Ian provided voice work for the Adult Swim show Metalocalypse, as the character "Some Guy Who Snuck Into Dethklok's Trunk Last Night When They Were Pretty Hammered" in the "Season III: The Dead Man" opening episode "Renovationklok", as well as providing guest voices in the episode "Tributeklok".

Ian did a spoken word tour entitled Speaking Words, starting in May 2013, in the UK.

In 2014, he and his wife joined former members of Mother Superior to form Motor Sister. They released their debut album, Ride, on March 9, 2015.

He also toured Europe and North American with a solo spoken word storytelling act called "Speaking Words" that year.

In 2015, Da Capo Press published Ian's memoir titled I'm the Man: The Story of That Guy from Anthrax.

On December 12, 2017, Ian released his book Access All Areas: Stories from a Hard Rock Life, which is a follow-up to his first autobiographical book I'm the Man, published November 24, 2015. The book features stories about his life including not only his adventures with Anthrax, but also with other musical celebrities such as Madonna and David Lee Roth.

In 2018, he toured Australia on another spoken word act called "'Spoken Word Stories by Scottie'" also known as "One Man Riot".

In 2019, he contributed the foreword to the book King's X: The Oral History by Greg Prato, published by Jawbone Press.

In 2020, Ian joined Mr. Bungle for their series of reunion shows where they performed their 1986 demo album The Raging Wrath of the Easter Bunny. He then played on the re-recording of the album which was released later that year.

== Appearances in films ==
Ian has appeared as himself in the 2003 comedy Calendar Girls and representing the character Kevin's conscience, in the 2022 American teen comedy-drama Metal Lords. Ian played a zombie in the Walking Dead appearing in the 2015 episode "Remember." In 2023, he voiced an Elite Tribunal Soldier animated musical fantasy film Metalocalypse: Army of the Doomstar.

== Personal life ==
Ian was formerly married to his high school girlfriend, Marge Ginsburg, in the 1980s; the marriage ended in divorce.

In 2011, he married singer Pearl Aday, adopted daughter of singer Meat Loaf. They have one child.

Ian is a New York Yankees fan and enjoys snowboarding. He plays poker and is an online pro at UltimateBet; he finished 637th in the 2009 World Series of Poker Main Event, taking home $21,365. He is also a Battlestar Galactica fan and has posted numerous blogs about the show, even making an appearance for the red carpet series finale; he also played guitar on the soundtrack of The Plan, a made-for-DVD Battlestar Galactica film. He is a fan of the television series Doctor Who, as seen in "The Best of the Doctor", which aired August 13, 2011, on BBC America (numbered episode 166). Ian is a fan of hip hop and rap music, particularly Public Enemy and Run-DMC. He was known to wear Public Enemy shirts while performing gigs in the late 1980s. He has also said Run-DMC came out with the same aggression that metal bands played with (that he was listening to at the time), and that Run-DMC was the group that put rap on the map.

He co-owned a hard rock bar called Dead Man's Hand in Las Vegas with Jerry Cantrell of Alice in Chains.

Ian is an avid fan of Stephen King and has collected first and limited editions of his books. A number of Anthrax's songs were inspired by King's stories such as "Among the Living" (based on The Stand), "A Skeleton In The Closet" (Apt Pupil), "Lone Justice" and "Breathing Lightning" (The Dark Tower series).

== Discography ==
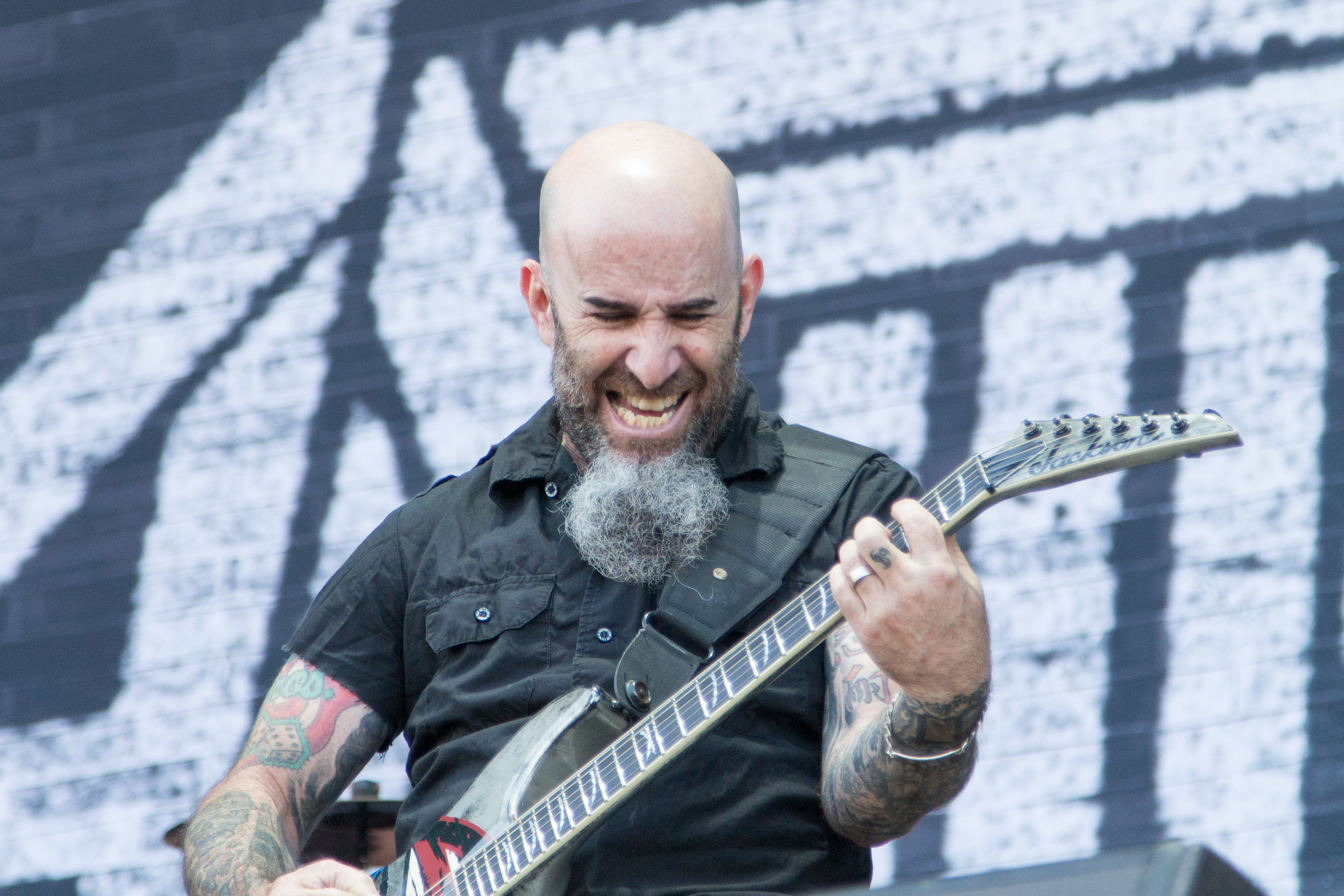
Ian at Nova Rock Festival 2014

=== With Stormtroopers of Death ===
Date of release	Title	Label	Chart positions	US sales
December 1985	Speak English or Die	Megaforce Records		
October 24, 1992	Live at Budokan	Megaforce Records		
May 22, 1999	Bigger than the Devil	Nuclear Blast Records		
August 21, 2007	Rise of the Infidels	Megaforce Records		

=== Stormtroopers of Death videos ===
Date of release	Title	Label	Chart positions	US sales
January 23, 2001	Kill Yourself: The Movie (DVD or VHS)	Nuclear Blast Records		
September 25, 2001	Speak English or Live (DVD)	Nuclear Blast Records		
July 26, 2005	20 Years of Dysfunction	Nuclear Blast Records		

=== With Mr. Bungle ===
Date of release	Title	Label	Chart positions	US sales
October 30, 2020	The Raging Wrath of the Easter Bunny Demo	Ipecac		
June 11, 2021	The Night They Came Home	Ipecac		

=== Collaborations ===
- Performed with Public Enemy during the Rock the Bells 2007 tour.
- Comedian Brian Posehn's music video "Metal By Numbers".
- Wrote the DC 2-part comic Lobo: Highway to Hell (2-part series, illustrated by Sam Kieth)
- Played guitar on "Apocalypse (Theme from The Plan)", a track on Bear McCreary's Razor/The Plan soundtrack.
- Performed guitar on "Evil Rules" by rapper Necro on his 2007 album, "Death Rap".
- Played guitar on all tracks on Pearl's "Little Immaculate White Fox" (2010).
- Played guitar on Cut-throat on Sepultura's album SepulQuarta, album of quarantine collaborations (2021).
- Played guitar on "Mustard Mucous" from Amen by Igorrr (2025).

=== Television ===
- Married... with Children 1992
- NewsRadio (as himself)
- VH1's Rock Show (as host) 1999–2002
- VH1's Hip-Hop Honors – performer along with Anthrax & Public Enemy for "Bring Tha Noise".
- VH1's Supergroup 2006
- VH1's "I Love The..." series specials
- VH1's "40 Greatest Metal Songs"
- VH1's "100 Most Metal Moments"
- VH1's "40 Least Metal Moments"
- VH1's "100 Greatest Hard Rock Songs"
- VH1's "100 Most Shocking Music Moments"
- VH1's "100 Greatest Artists of Hard Rock"
- VH1's Rock Honors Kiss. Performers: Rob Zombie (Rob Zombie, White Zombie), Scott Ian, Gilby Clarke (ex-Guns N' Roses, The Starfuckers, Rock Star Supernova), Slash (ex-Guns N' Roses, Velvet Revolver), Ace Frehley (ex-Kiss), Tommy Lee (Mötley Crüe, Rock Star Supernova).
- VH1 Classic's "Rock 'n Roll Celebrity Poker Tournament" – Scott won the tournament and played against Sully Erna (Godsmack), Vinnie Paul (ex-Pantera), Dusty Hill (ZZ Top) and Ace Frehley.
- NBC's The Celebrity Apprentice
- Metalocalypse – "RenovationKlok" (voice only)
- Metalocalypse – "TributeKlok" (voice only)
- That Metal Show – Season 4, Episode 3, along with wife Pearl Aday.
- That Metal Show – Season 8, Episode 5, along with bandmate Charlie Benante, and Dave Sabo of Skid Row.
- That Metal Show – Season 14, Episode 2, along with bandmates Charlie Benante and Frank Bello
- AMC's Talking Dead, panel member.
- The Walking Dead Webisodes: "Torn Apart", walker.
- The Walking Dead - "Remember", as a walker.
- The Nerdist Industries Blood and Guts with Scott Ian 2012

== Equipment ==
Scott Ian uses his signature Jackson guitars and signature Randall MTS Series heads and cabinets. He is known to use Dimebag Darrell tribute Deans and previously endorsed Washburn. During the mid-1980s, he used ESP guitars for a while, also getting Kirk Hammett his ESP endorsement. Scott uses a DigiTech signature Black 13 distortion pedal, and a DigiTech chorus pedal for his clean sounds. Many of his guitars have been equipped with custom made Seymour Duncan "El Diablo" pickups, but can also be seen using standard Seymour Duncan SH-4's and '59 pickups on several guitars, including his newest signature Jackson. He also recently began endorsing Evertune bridges.

In late 2009, Ian ended his endorsement with Washburn and went back to Jackson guitars. He was seen using custom made Soloist and Randy Rhoads guitars during the 2009 Sonisphere Festival. On March 27, 2010, Ian announced the production of a new signature guitar by Jackson via Twitter and YouTube. He said it would be based on his Soloist from 1987. It has a silverburst finish, a single Seymour Duncan J.B. humbucker, lightning bolt inlays, and a string-thru/tune-o-matic bridge. A dual-humbucker version with a Floyd Rose tremolo will also be released. He stated, "I am so stoked to be back with Jackson." He was seen using this guitar while playing with Brian Posehn at the Revolver Golden Gods Awards and with the Damned Things at the 2011 Download Festival.

=== Guitars ===
- Jackson Scott Ian Signature T-1000 Soloist
- Jackson custom T-1000 Randy Rhoads
- Jackson custom "NOT" Soloist
- Jackson Adrian Smith San Dimas Dinky
- Gibson Flying V (1982, Used in the studio)
- Gibson "Thunderhorse" Explorer (Used at Download Festival 2011 with the Damned Things)
- Jackson JJ1 (USA-made, Seymour Duncan JB And Jazz pickups, Alder or Korina body with maple neck)
- Jackson JJ2 (USA-Made, Seymour Duncan El-Diablo pickups and a killswitch, alder body with maple neck or mahogany body with mahogany neck)
- Jackson JJ4 (Lower-end model, Asian-Made, with Duncan Designed pickups and a killswitch)
- Jackson JJ5 (5-string Baritone)
- Jackson Custom "NOT" Telecaster
- Charvel Surfcaster (with Seymour Duncan Humbucker in the Bridge Position and the stock Chandler Lipstick pickup in the angled Neck position: Main guitar for the Sound of White Noise era)
- Jackson Randy Rhoads (1982)
- Washburn SI75TI (Used Washburn from 2004 to 2009)
- Washburn WV540VASI
- Washburn WV40VASI
- Washburn SI60MW
- Washburn SI61G
- ESP M-100FM
- ESP Custom M-II and Telecasters (1985–1989)
- ESP TE-230SI (Signature model based on Scott Ian's red ESP Telecaster in the mid-to-late 1980s. Japan only)
- Seymour Duncan J.B. pickups
- Seymour Duncan El Diablo (Scott Ian custom shop pickups)
- D'Addario .9-.42
- D'Addario & DR Strings .10-.52
- DR Strings .18-.56 (for JJ-5)
- Dunlop Tortex .88mm Picks

=== Effects ===
In Rack Case:

- Fortin Zuul Noise Gate
- MXR EVH Eddie Van Halen Phase 90
- MXR Carbon Copy Analog Delay
- MXR M-135 Smart Gate (x3)
- CAE MC402 Boost/Overdrive
- TC Electronic Corona Chorus

On Floor:

- CAE MC404 Wah
- DigiTech WH-2 Whammy
- Boss TU-3 Tuner

Other:

- BBE 462 Sonic Maximizer
- DigiTech Black 13 distortion pedal
- DigiTech XMC chorus pedal
- TC Electronic Booster+ Line Driver & Distortion
- Korg DTR-1 Tuner
- Rocktron HUSH IIC
- Samson UHF Synth 6 Wireless

=== Amplifiers ===
- EVH 5150 IIIS EL34 heads (Current main amps)
- Fender/EVH 5150III Heads (used for recording Worship Music and For All Kings, also used live occasionally)
- Randall Ultimate Nullifier UN120 (second Randall signature amp, designed by Mike Fortin)
- Randall MTS Series RM100SI signature head with signature modules (first Randall signature amp)
- Randall MTS series RM100 and RM100LB heads (With Ultra modules)
- Randall V2 400 Watt Heads (Can be seen in advertisements)
- Randall V-Max Heads (Used in 2003 before the V2 and MTS heads)
- Randall Cyclone Heads (Used from 2001 to 2003)
- Randall Warhead Heads (First amp used when Ian transitioned from Marshall to Randall)
- Randall SI412 signature speaker Cabs
- Randall NB412 Nuno Bettencourt Signature 4×12 Cabs
- Randall XL 4×12 Cabs
- Randall XL 2×12 and 1×15 Cabs
- Marshall JCM 800 2203 (Early years of Anthrax, and used for leads on "We've Come For You All". Used by both Scott and Rob Caggiano for recording Worship Music, and by Scott for For All Kings)
- Peavey 6505+ 120 Watt head
- Randall RT100 heads (Only used at the 2010 Revolver Golden Gods Awards while performing in Brian Posehn's backing band)
- Randall RT-412RC Cabs (See above)
