= Charlie Benante =

American drummer (born 1962)

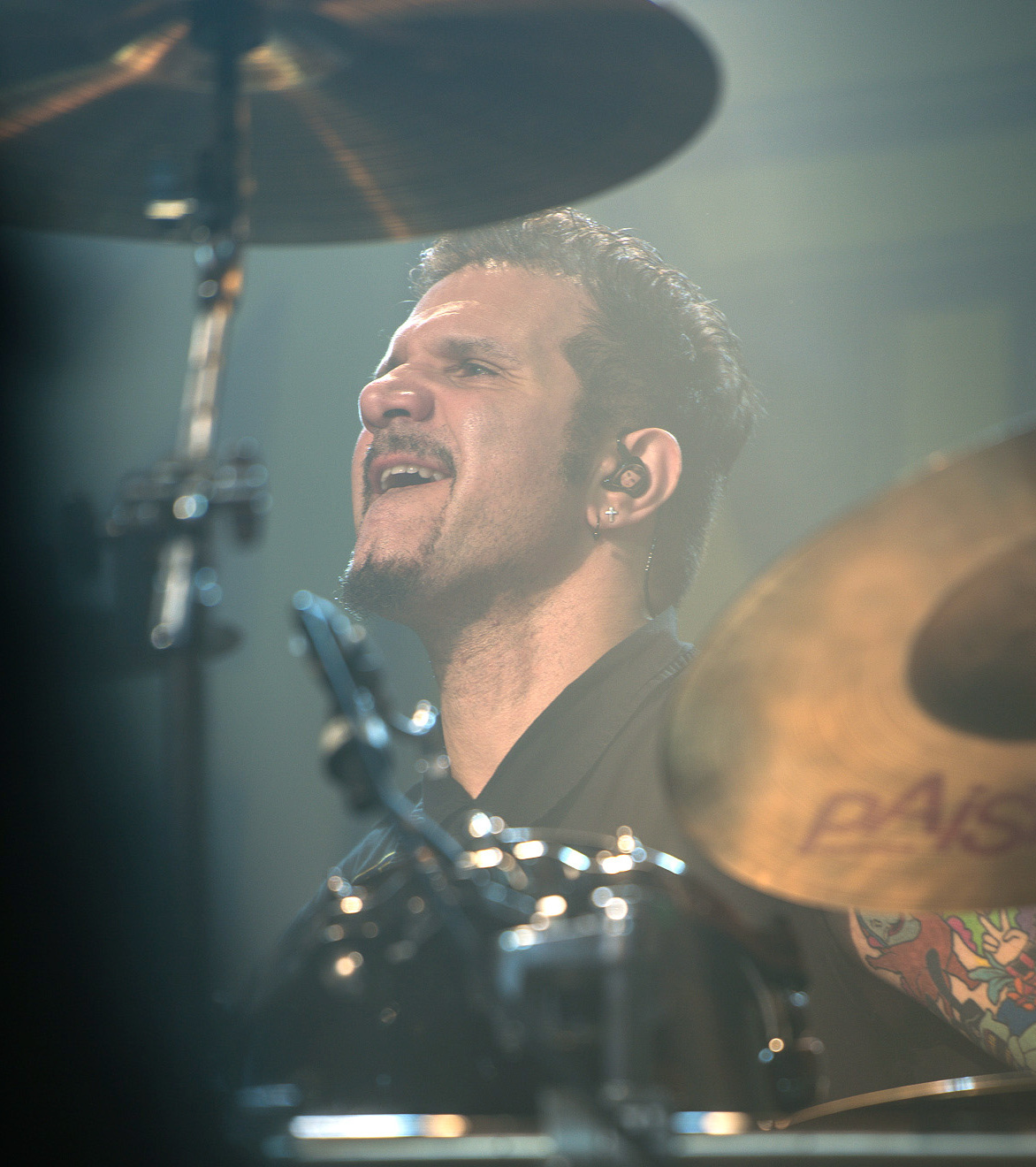
- Benante in 2017

Background information
- Born: Charles Lee Benante; November 27, 1962 (age 63); The Bronx, New York, U.S.
- Genres: Thrash metal; crossover thrash; groove metal
- Occupations: Musician; songwriter
- Instrument: Drums
- Years active: 1982–present
- Member of: Anthrax, Pantera (touring member)
- Formerly of: Stormtroopers of Death, Metal Allegiance
- Website: charliebenante.com

Charles Lee Benante (born November 27, 1962) is an American musician, best known as the drummer for thrash metal band Anthrax and crossover thrash band Stormtroopers of Death. Known as one of the pioneers of double bass drumming and credited with popularizing the blast beat technique, he is Anthrax's main composer and has released twelve studio albums with the band. He also plays guitar on occasion. Benante has toured with the reunited Pantera since 2022.

== Career ==
Benante joined Anthrax in 1983, prior to the recording of the band's debut album Fistful of Metal, and has appeared on every release by the band. He is known for having a very fast double kick technique and has been credited as one of the pioneers of double bass, as well as with popularizing the blast beat technique with thrash metal.

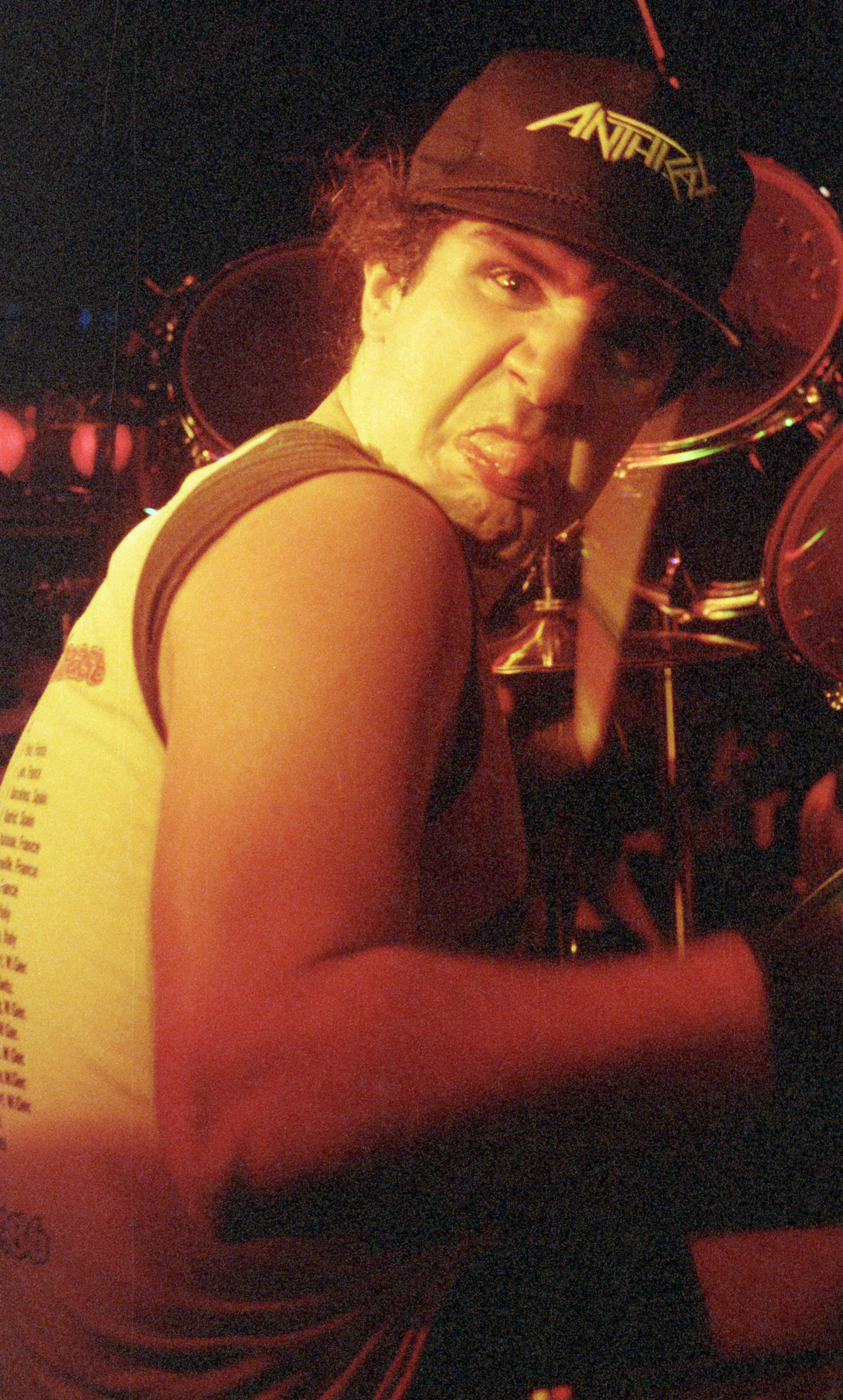
Benante with Anthrax in 1987

He is also a guitarist, having contributed lead guitar to S.O.D.'s Speak English or Die album. Along with his musician duties, Benante is also a graphic artist and has created many of Anthrax's album covers and T-shirt designs.

In 2021, Benante released a solo album entitled Silver Linings. Paul Stenning referred to the album as "a very worthy memento of attacking a crazy year with a positive outlook."

On July 14, 2022, it was announced that Benante had joined the reunited Pantera by filling in for original drummer, and his close friend, Vinnie Paul.

== Personal life ==
Benante grew up in Throggs Neck, Bronx.

Benante is a fan of the 1975 film Jaws, and owns a sizeable collection of the film's merchandise. He was featured in the documentary The Shark Is Still Working, which was included on the Jaws 2012 Blu-ray release.

Throughout the course of 2012, Benante faced several personal issues that forced him to miss several concerts with Anthrax. Early on in the year his mother died, which also resulted in Frank Bello (Benante's mother being Bello's grandmother) taking some time off during the band's tour in Argentina. Benante stepped out again during the summer's Rockstar Mayhem Fest run after suffering a "minor hand injury". Also during the summer, Benante was involved in a domestic dispute with his wife in front of his daughter which had them both arrested. Benante later missed the band's UK and European tour in order to take care of "personal stuff" according to Scott Ian. In 2013, it was announced that Benante would be sitting out Australian tour dates, also for personal reasons. Concern was raised in 2012 by MetalSucks over Benante's well-being and future with the band.

In 2020, Benante had a cameo in the music video for "Everything She Wants," a Wham!-cover performed by Alien Ant Farm.

In 2025, Benante married musician Carla Harvey.

Charlie is also a member of the 501st Legion, a world-wide group of Star Wars fans who make their own screen accurate costumes and do public appearances for charity.

== Equipment ==
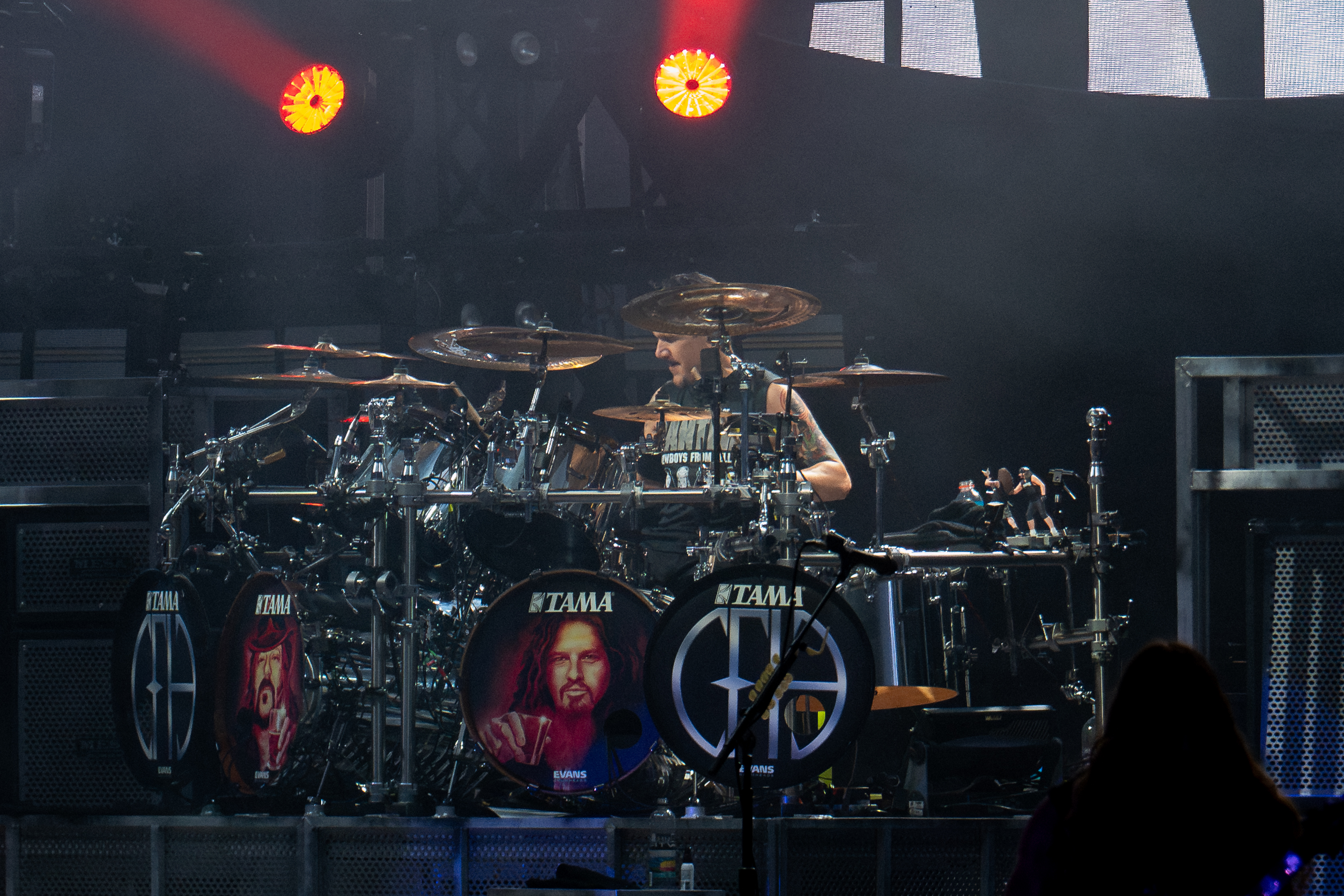
Benante with Pantera in 2023

Benante uses and endorses Tama drums and hardware, Paiste cymbals, Vic Firth sticks, Evans Drumheads, and Roland electronics.

Prior to switching to Tama's Speed Cobra pedals in 2010, Benante was one of the few drummers who used Tama's HP35 Camco chain-drive pedals, equipment he had used since 1984.

== Discography ==
=== Solo ===
Title	Release date	Label	Chart positions	US sales
Silver Linings	May 14, 2021	Megaforce Records		
Moving Pitchers (EP)	April 23, 2022	Megaforce Records		

=== Stormtroopers of Death albums ===
Title	Release date	Label	Chart positions	US sales
Speak English or Die	December 1985	Megaforce Records		
Live at Budokan [Live]	October 24, 1995	Megaforce Records		
Bigger than the Devil	May 22, 1999	Nuclear Blast Records		

=== Stormtroopers of Death videos ===
Title	Release date	Label	Chart positions	US sales
Kill Yourself: The Movie (DVD or VHS)	January 23, 2001	Nuclear Blast Records		
Speak English or Live (DVD)	September 25, 2001	Nuclear Blast Records		
20 Years of Dysfunction	July 26, 2005	Nuclear Blast Records		

=== Others ===
- Liquid Tension Experiment 2 – When the Keyboard Breaks: Live in Chicago (guest drums)
- The Violent Hour - The Violent Hour EP
