= Return of the Killer A's =

Compilation album / Best of album by Anthrax
- Released: November 23, 1999
- Genres: Thrash metal, alternative metal
- Length: 74:50
- Label: Beyond Music
- Producers: Anthrax; The Butcher Brothers; Carl Canedy; Paul Crook; Mark Dodson; Dave Jerden; Eddie Kramer

Anthrax chronology
Inside Out (1998)	Return of the Killer A's (1999)	Madhouse: The Very Best of Anthrax (2001)

Professional ratings
Review scores
Source	Rating
AllMusic	4/5 stars
Robert Christgau	(dud)
Collector's Guide to Heavy Metal	6/10
Encyclopedia of Popular Music	3/5 stars
Kerrang!	3/5 stars
The New Rolling Stone Album Guide	4/5 stars

Return of the Killer A's is a compilation / best of album by American heavy metal band Anthrax, released in 1999.

The cover of "Ball of Confusion" features Anthrax's first new recording with former lead singer Joey Belladonna since 1991, and their first with former bassist Dan Lilker since 1984. Neither one would stay with the band past that song's recording, though a tour featuring both Belladonna and then-current Anthrax singer John Bush was in the works at one point. The song is also notable because it features both Belladonna and Bush on vocals.

== Track listing ==
No.	Title	Writer(s)	Original album (date)	Length
1.	"Bring the Noise" (Public Enemy feat. Anthrax)	Carl Ridenhour, Hank Shocklee, Eric "Vietnam" Sadler, Anthrax	Attack of the Killer B's (1991)	3:26
2.	"Only"	John Bush, Scott Ian, Frank Bello, Charlie Benante	Sound of White Noise (1993)	4:56
3.	"Potter's Field" (Hypo Luxa Hermes Pan Remix)	Bush, Ian, Bello, Benante	Sound of White Noise	4:44
4.	"Ball of Confusion" (The Temptations cover)	Norman Whitfield, Barrett Strong	Previously unreleased	4:33
5.	"Crush"	Bush, Ian, Benante	Volume 8: The Threat Is Real (1998)	4:20
6.	"Room for One More"	Bush, Ian, Bello, Benante	Sound of White Noise	4:57
7.	"Inside Out"	Bush, Ian, Benante	Inside Out (1999)	5:29
8.	"Hy Pro Glo" (Hy Pro Luxa Mix)	Bush, Ian, Bello, Benante	Sound of White Noise	5:02
9.	"Fueled"	Bush, Ian, Benante	Stomp 442 (1995)	4:02
10.	"Among the Living"	Anthrax	Among the Living (1987)	5:16
11.	"Got the Time"	Joe Jackson	Persistence of Time (1990)	2:44
12.	"Indians"	Anthrax	Among the Living	5:40
13.	"Antisocial" (Trust cover)	Bernie Bonvoisin, Norbert Krief	State of Euphoria (1988)	4:24
14.	"I'm the Man" (Edited version)	Joey Belladonna, Dan Spitz, Ian, Bello, Benante, John Rooney	I'm the Man (1987)	3:02
15.	"Madhouse"	Anthrax	Spreading the Disease (1985)	4:17
16.	"I Am the Law"	Anthrax	Among the Living	5:54
17.	"Metal Thrashing Mad" (Available in some editions only)	Neil Turbin, Spitz, Ian, Danny Lilker, Benante	Fistful of Metal (1984)	2:43

The album included at least one song from all but their debut studio album, Fistful of Metal, up to the point of the disc's release in 1999. Also included is the track taken from two EPs and "Bring the Noise", a Public Enemy remix featuring Anthrax previously released on Attack of the Killer B's, the compilation of B-sides.

Two singles were released from Return of the Killer A's:

- "Crush" was released as a single off the album, appearing only with the song itself, on which it says "From the Beyond Music release Return of the Killer A's - The Best of Anthrax.
- "Ball of Confusion" was released as a single also, having the album version of the song, along with the edit.

== Personnel ==
- John Bush – lead vocals
- Dan Spitz – lead guitar
- Scott Ian – rhythm guitar, backing vocals
- Frank Bello – bass guitar, backing vocals
- Charlie Benante – drums
- Joey Belladonna - lead vocals
- Paul Crook - lead guitar
- Dan Lilker - Bass guitar on Ball Of Confusion & Metal Thrashing Mad

== Charts ==
Chart (2000)	Peak position
UK Rock & Metal Albums (Official Charts)	34
