= Madhouse: The Very Best of Anthrax =

Compilation album by Anthrax
- Released: June 26, 2001
- Recorded: 1985–1991
- Genre: Thrash metal
- Length: 61:00
- Label: Island
- Producer: Anthrax; Mark Dodson; Paul Hamingson; Eddie Kramer; Mike Ragogna

Anthrax chronology
Return of the Killer A's (1999)	Madhouse: The Very Best of Anthrax (2001)	We've Come for You All (2003)

Madhouse: The Very Best of Anthrax is the sixteenth release and second compilation album by the band Anthrax.

The album was released in 2001 by the Island Def Jam Music Group without the direct participation of any band member, unlike the 1999 release Return of the Killer A's. Such was the haphazard nature of the release that guitarist and founding member Scott Ian openly criticized Island Def Jam for what he saw as the shoddy nature of the compilation, especially the accidental inclusion of the Persistence of Time track "Time" in place of the band's hit cover version of Joe Jackson's "Got the Time", which was listed on the cover. The iTunes Music Store digital version of the album, and presumably subsequent pressings of the CD version, correct this mistake but incorrectly list "Keep It in the Family" as a live version. Metallica's James Hetfield is featured on the "I'm The Man".

Professional ratings
Review scores
Source	Rating
AllMusic	4/5 stars
Encyclopedia of Popular Music	4/5 stars
The New Rolling Stone Album Guide	3.5/5 stars

== Track listing ==
1. "Madhouse" (Anthrax) – 4:18
2. "A.I.R." (Anthrax) – 5:48
3. "Armed and Dangerous" (Neil Turbin, Scott Ian) – 5:45
4. "I Am the Law" (Anthrax, Danny Lilker) – 5:56
5. "Indians" (Anthrax) – 5:41
6. "Caught in a Mosh" (Anthrax) – 5:00
7. "I'm the Man" (Anthrax, John Rooney, Moore) – 3:04
8. "Antisocial" (Bernie Bonvoisin, Norbert Krief) – 4:27
9. "Belly of the Beast" (Anthrax) – 4:47
10. "Time" (Anthrax) – 6:55
11. "Keep It in the Family" (Anthrax) – 7:09
12. "Bring the Noise" (Anthrax, Carl Ridenhour, Hank Shocklee, Eric "Vietnam" Sadler) – 3:28

=== Reissue track listing ===
1. "Madhouse" (Anthrax) – 4:18
2. "A.I.R." (Anthrax) – 5:48
3. "Armed and Dangerous" (Neil Turbin, Scott Ian) – 5:45
4. "I Am the Law" (Anthrax, Lilker) – 5:56
5. "Indians" (Anthrax) – 5:41
6. "Caught in a Mosh" (Anthrax) – 5:00
7. "I'm the Man" featuring James Hetfield (Anthrax, Rooney, Moore) – 3:04
8. "Antisocial" (Bonvoisin, Krief) – 4:27
9. "Belly of the Beast" (Anthrax) – 4:47
10. "Got the Time" (Joe Jackson) – 2:44
11. "Keep It in the Family" (Anthrax) – 7:09
12. "Bring the Noise" (Anthrax, Ridenhour, Shocklee, Sadler) – 3:28
- Tracks 1–3 taken from Spreading the Disease.
- Tracks 4–6 taken from Among the Living.
- Track 7 taken from I'm the Man EP.
- Track 8 taken from State of Euphoria.
- Tracks 9–11 taken from Persistence of Time.
- Track 12 taken from Attack of the Killer B's.
