= Live: The Island Years =

Live album by Anthrax
- Released: April 5, 1994
- Recorded: October 19, 1991; January 28, 1992
- Venues: Irvine Meadows Amphitheatre (Irvine, CA); Electric Lady Studios (New York City)
- Genre: Thrash metal
- Length: 69:26
- Labels: Megaforce; Island
- Producers: Steve Thompson; Michael Barbiero

Anthrax chronology
Sound of White Noise (1993)	Live: The Island Years (1994)	Stomp 442 (1995)

Live: The Island Years is Anthrax's first full-length live album. The album was released in 1994 by Megaforce Worldwide/Island Entertainment. As it is a live album, there were no new singles. The album features vocalist Joey Belladonna, who had been replaced in the band two years earlier by John Bush.

Anthrax were not directly involved in the making of this album, whose release was due to remaining contractual obligations towards their previous record company, following the band's signing with Elektra. As such, the track list is cobbled from two disparate sources: the soundtrack to the band's earlier Live Noize home video, recorded at Irvine Meadows, California on October 19, 1991 (tracks one to eight), and tapes from a concert staged for college radio WSOU, recorded at the Electric Lady Studios, on January 28, 1992 (tracks nine to twelve).

The rendition of "Bring the Noise" on this album features both Anthrax and Public Enemy, and starts out with Flavor Flav doing most of his song "Too Much Posse", to a beat by Anthrax drummer Charlie Benante.

Professional ratings
Review scores
Source	Rating
AllMusic	3/5 stars
Collector's Guide to Heavy Metal	7/10
Encyclopedia of Popular Music	3/5 stars
The New Rolling Stone Album Guide	3/5 stars

== Track listing ==
All songs written by Anthrax, except where noted.

1. "Efilnikufesin (N.F.L.)" – 6:59
2. "A.I.R." – 4:35
3. "Parasite" (Ace Frehley) – 2:52
4. "Keep It in the Family" – 7:05
5. "Caught in a Mosh" – 5:26
6. "Indians" – 6:59
7. "Antisocial" (Bernie Bonvoisin, Norbert Krief) – 6:38
8. "Bring the Noise (Feat. Public Enemy)" (Anthrax, Carl Ridenhour, Hank Shocklee, Eric "Vietnam" Sadler) – 7:38
9. "I Am the Law" (Anthrax, Danny Lilker) – 6:04
10. "Metal Thrashing Mad" (Neil Turbin, Scott Ian, Lilker) – 2:46
11. "In My World" – 6:36
12. "Now It's Dark" – 5:48

== Personnel ==
Anthrax

- Joey Belladonna – lead vocals
- Dan Spitz – lead guitar, backing vocals
- Scott Ian – rhythm guitar, backing vocals
- Frank Bello – bass, backing vocals
- Charlie Benante – drums

Production

- Michael Barbiero - production, engineering, mixing
- Steve Thompson - production, mixing
