= Attack of the Killer B's =

Compilation album by Anthrax
- Released: June 25, 1991
- Recorded: 1989–1991
- Genres: Thrash metal; rap metal
- Length: 44:24
- Labels: Megaforce; Island
- Producers: Anthrax; Mark Dodson; Charlie Benante

Anthrax chronology
Persistence of Time (1990)	Attack of the Killer B's (1991)	Sound of White Noise (1993)

Professional ratings
Review scores
Source	Rating
AllMusic	4/5 stars
Robert Christgau	(dud)
Collector's Guide to Heavy Metal	7/10
Encyclopedia of Popular Music	3/5 stars
Entertainment Weekly	B
The New Rolling Stone Album Guide	3.5/5 stars

Attack of the Killer B's is a compilation album of B-sides, covers and rarities by the thrash metal band Anthrax and the band's last audio album released before vocalist John Bush replaced longtime Anthrax vocalist Joey Belladonna in 1992. The album was released in June 1991 by Megaforce Worldwide/Island Entertainment. The "B's" in the album's title refers to b-sides previously unreleased and compiled for a single release. In 1992 the album was nominated for a Grammy Award in the category Best Metal Performance.

== Album information ==
Though a collection of "B-sides", the album featured one of their biggest singles; a collaboration/cover of Public Enemy's "Bring the Noise". Attack of the Killer B's was certified gold by the RIAA. The two live tracks, "Keep It in the Family" and "Belly of the Beast", were recorded during the 1990–91 Persistence of Time tour. Also included is an updated version of their 1987 single, "I'm the Man", and three songs previously released only in Europe and Japan on the 1989 EP, Penikufesin ("Nise Fukin EP"), recorded during the State of Euphoria sessions.

Two versions of the album were released: the uncensored version contained full expletives and the song "Startin' Up a Posse", and the censored version which excluded the aforementioned track, and in place of the explicit words, a buzzing noise (like bees) is heard. The track "Startin' Up a Posse" is a tongue in cheek attack on the Parents Music Resource Center. The sample at the end of the track was taken from the final scene of the Marilyn Chambers movie "Insatiable". The compilation also includes covers of songs by Discharge, Kiss, Trust, and the surf rock staple "Pipeline", recorded by The Chantays.

The song "N.F.B. (Dallabnikufesin)" was intended to illustrate the band's disdain for power ballads, which were very fashionable in the commercial metal scene at the time, and parodies 80s glam metal power ballads. The band also covers two songs ("Milk (Ode to Billy)" and "Chromatic Death") originally recorded by Stormtroopers of Death, a mid-80s side project by Anthrax members Scott Ian, Charlie Benante, and then-bassist Dan Lilker. The "Billy" referenced in the title is S.O.D. vocalist Billy Milano.

"Bring the Noise" is a collaboration with rap group Public Enemy, making this song one of the first rap metal collaborations (albeit some years after the Aerosmith/Run DMC 1986 collaboration on "Walk This Way"), although Joey Belladonna and Dan Spitz had collaborated with Untouchable Force Organization on a song called "Lethal" in 1987 that was released as a single. "Bring the Noise" has been a live staple since Anthrax first played it on the Headbangers Ball Tour with Helloween and Exodus in 1989, and it later appeared in the videogames Tony Hawk's Pro Skater 2 and WWE SmackDown! vs. Raw.

== Track listing ==
No.	Title	Writer(s)	Length
1.	"Milk (Ode to Billy)" (S.O.D. cover)	Billy Milano, Charlie Benante, Danny Lilker, Scott Ian	3:44
2.	"Bring the Noise" (Public Enemy cover)	Carl Ridenhour, Hank Shocklee, Eric "Vietnam" Sadler, Anthrax	3:28
3.	"Keep It in the Family" (Live, Birmingham, England)	Anthrax	7:19
4.	"Startin' Up a Posse"	Anthrax	4:14
5.	"Protest and Survive" (Discharge cover)	Kevin "Cal" Morris, Roy "Rainy" Wainwright, Garry Maloney, Tony "Bones" Roberts	2:20
6.	"Chromatic Death" (S.O.D. cover)	Milano, Benante, Lilker, Ian	1:28
7.	"I'm the Man '91"	Anthrax, John Rooney	5:00
8.	"Parasite" (Kiss cover)	Ace Frehley	3:14
9.	"Pipeline" (The Chantays cover)	Bob Spickard, Brian Carman	2:00
10.	"Sects" (Trust cover)	Norbert Krief, Bernie Bonvoisin	3:06
11.	"Belly of the Beast" (Live, Birmingham, England)	Anthrax	6:01
12.	"N.F.B. (Dallabnikufesin)"	Anthrax	2:16

== Personnel ==
Anthrax

- Joey Belladonna - lead vocals, backing vocals
- Dan Spitz - lead guitar, backing vocals
- Scott Ian - rhythm guitar, backing vocals, lead vocals (third and fourth verses) on "Bring the Noise", "Protest and Survive", "Startin' Up a Posse", and "I'm the Man '91"
- Frank Bello - bass, backing vocals
- Charlie Benante - drums, lead vocals on "I'm the Man '91", sampling and drum programming on "Bring the Noise" and "I'm the Man '91", 12-string acoustic guitar on "N.F.B. (Dallabnikufesin)"

Additional musicians

- Chuck D - lead vocals (first two verses) on "Bring the Noise"
- Flavor Flav - backing vocals on "Bring the Noise"
- Mark Dodson - backing vocals on "Startin' Up a Posse"
- Ed "Parasite" Trunk - backing vocals on "Parasite"

== Charts ==
Chart (1991)	Peak position
Australian Albums (ARIA)	50
Canada Top Albums/CDs (RPM)	50
Finnish Albums (The Official Finnish Charts)	9
UK Albums (Official Charts)	13
US Billboard 200	27

== Certifications ==
Region	Certification	Certified units/sales
Canada (Music Canada)	Gold	50,000^{^}
United States (RIAA)	Gold	500,000^{^}
^{^} Shipments figures based on certification alone.
