= Répression dans l'Hexagone =

Live (Répression Dans l'Hexagone)

Live album by Trust
- Released: 1992
- Recorded: 1980
- Genre: Hard rock
- Length
- Label: Sony Music

Live (a.k.a. Répression Dans l'Hexagone) is a 1992 album by French hard rock band Trust. It was released as a single album twelve years after its recording in 1980. The album has been considered the closest thing to a greatest hits album in the Trust catalogue.

== Track listing ==
1. "Intro" (Soundcheck)
2. "Darquier" (Original version found on The Backsides [EP])
3. "Police Milice" (Original version found on Trust I)
4. "Mr Comédie" (Original version found on Répression)
5. "Fatalité" (Original version found on Répression)
6. "Préfabriqués" (Original version found on Trust I)
7. "Palace" (Original version found on Trust I)
8. "Le Matteur" (Original version found on Trust I)
9. "Les Brutes" (Original version found on Marche Ou Crève)
10. "H & D" (Original version found on Trust I)
11. "Toujours Pas Une Tune" Night Long (Original version found on Trust I)
12. "Problem Child" (Original version by AC/DC)
13. "Live Wire" (Original version by AC/DC)
14. "Bosser 8 Heures" (Original version found on Trust I)
15. "Antisocial" (Original version found on Répression)

== Personnel ==
- Bernard "Bernie" Bonvoisin - Vocals
- Norbert "Nono" Krief - Lead Guitar
- Moho Shemlek - Rhythm Guitar
- Yves "Vivi" Brusco - Bass
- Kevin Morris - Drums
