= Penikufesin =

EP by Anthrax
- Released: August 1989
- Recorded: 1988–1989
- Genre: Thrash metal
- Length: 24:38
- Label: Megaforce; Island
- Producer: Anthrax; Mark Dodson

Anthrax chronology
State of Euphoria (1988)	Penikufesin (1989)	Persistence of Time (1990)

Professional ratings
Review scores
Source	Rating
AllMusic	3/5 stars

Penikufesin is the third EP by the American thrash metal band Anthrax. Culled from the State of Euphoria sessions, it was released in August 1989 on Megaforce Records/Island Records.

== Background ==
The EP includes the songs "Now It's Dark" (from State of Euphoria), a French version of the Trust cover "Antisocial" (the English version also appeared on State of Euphoria), the classic tune "Friggin' in the Riggin'" (made famous by the Sex Pistols), "Parasite" (a Kiss cover), "Le Sects" (another Trust cover) and "Pipeline" (a surf rock instrumental recorded by the Chantays). The last three songs later appeared on Attack of the Killer B's ("Le Sects" was renamed "Sects"). "Friggin' in the Riggin'" was previously released as the B-side of the 1988 single "Make Me Laugh", while the French version of "Antisocial" had appeared on the Australian edition of State of Euphoria; this track was later released on the compilation album Anthrology: No Hit Wonders (1985–1991).

Penikufesin means "nise [nice] fukin [fucking]" EP" spelled backwards. It refers to a song entitled "Efilnikufesin (N.F.L.)" ("ni[c]e fu[c]kin' life") that appeared on Anthrax's 1987 album Among the Living, another song called "N.F.B. (Dallabnikufesin)" ("ni[c]e fu[c]kin' ballad"), which later appeared on the band's 1991 compilation album Attack of the Killer B's, also refers to that song.

== Releases ==
The album was released in August 1989 by Megaforce Records / Island Records in Europe, Japan and Australia.

Penikufesin has never been officially released in the U.S. or Canada, although Anthrax themselves have since acknowledged it as a canon release, and for a while, the EP had been listed on the discography page from their official website. The EP's tracks would resurface on the State of Euphoria reissue that is part of the Aftershock four-CD set of albums.

== Track listing ==
No.	Title	Writer(s)	Length
1.	"Now It's Dark"	Anthrax	5:34
2.	"Antisocial" (French Version)	Norbert Krief, Bernie Bonvoisin	4:26
3.	"Friggin' in the Riggin'"	Traditional, Arranged by Steve Jones/Additional lyrics by Anthrax	5:18
4.	"Parasite"	Ace Frehley	3:14
5.	"Sects"	Krief, Bonvoisin	3:06
6.	"Pipeline"	Bob Spickard, Brian Carman	3:00
Total length:			24:38

== Personnel ==
Anthrax

- Joey Belladonna – lead vocals
- Dan Spitz – lead guitar
- Scott Ian – rhythm guitar, backing vocals
- Frank Bello – bass, backing vocals
- Charlie Benante – drums

Production

- Anthrax – producer
- Mark Dodson – producer
- Jon Zazula – executive producer
- Marsha Zazula – executive producer
- Alex Perialas – associate producer, engineer
- Neil Zlozower – front cover photo
- Gene Ambo – back cover photos

== Charts ==
Chart (1989)	Peak position
Dutch Albums (Album Top 100)	51
Finnish Albums (The Official Finnish Charts)	11
