= C11H17N2O2S Na =

C11H17N2O2S Na may refer to:

- C_{11}H_{17}N_{2}O_{2}SNa, the molecular formula of sodium thiopental
- "C11H17N2O2S Na", a song by Anthrax on the album Sound of White Noise
