= Joey Belladonna =

American heavy metal singer

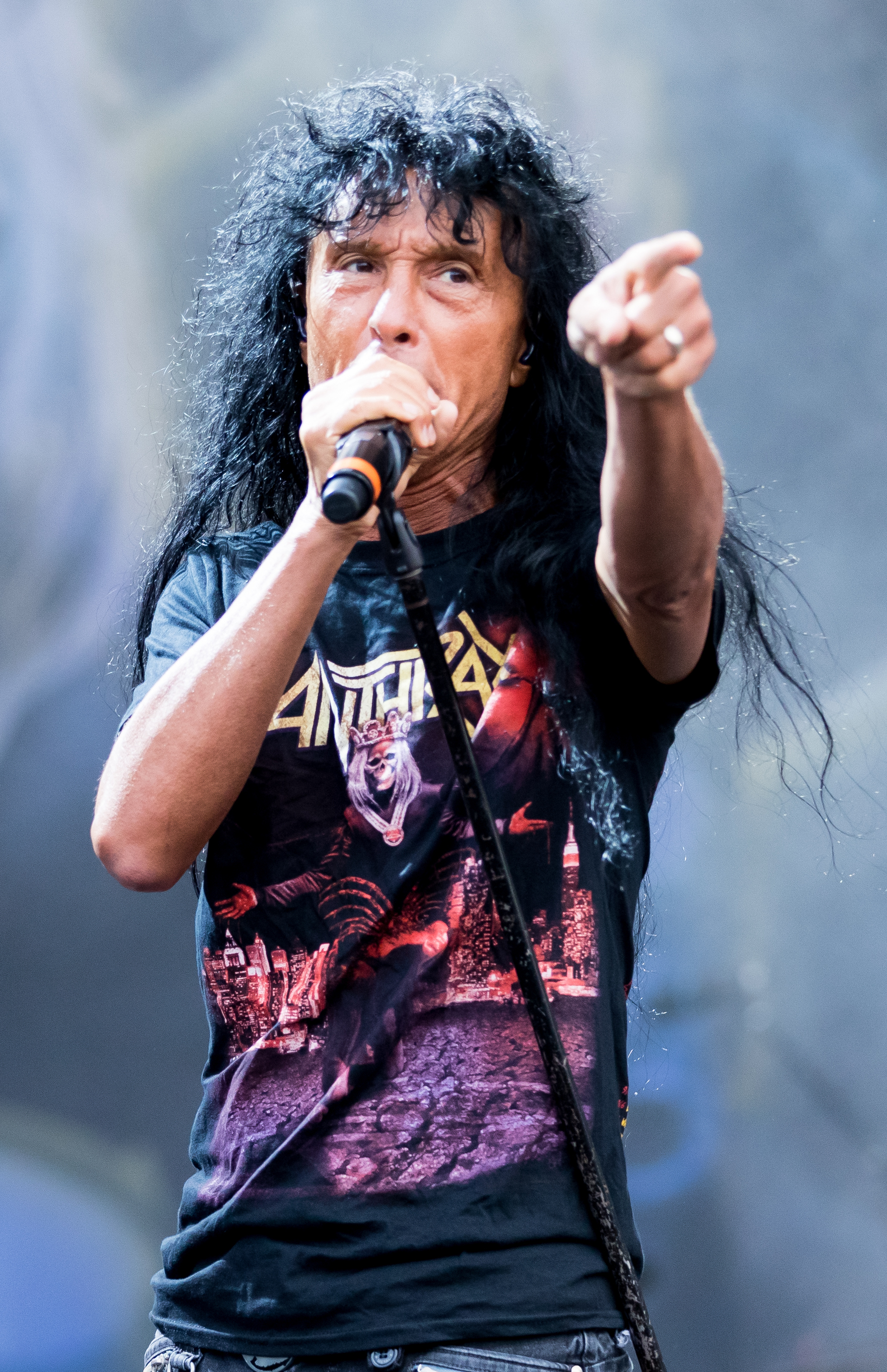
- Belladonna with Anthrax at Wacken Open Air 2019

Background information
- Born: Joseph Bellardini; October 13, 1960 (age 66); Oswego, New York, U.S.
- Genres: Heavy metal; thrash metal
- Occupation: Singer
- Years active: 1984–present
- Member of: Anthrax; Belladonna; Beyond Frontiers; Chief Big Way
- Formerly of: Bible Black
- Website: joeybelladonna.com

Joseph Belladonna (born October 13, 1960) is an American metal singer, best known as the lead vocalist and frontman for thrash metal band Anthrax during its most commercially successful period (mid-1980s to early 1990s). Appearing on albums such as Spreading the Disease, Among the Living, State of Euphoria, and Persistence of Time, his high, melodic tenor and energetic stage presence helped define the band's sound. After initially being fired from the band in 1992, he briefly reunited with the classic lineup in 2005 and has been on every Anthrax tour since 2010. Belladonna recorded further albums with the band, including Worship Music, For All Kings, and Cursum Perficio.

Outside of Anthrax, he has released solo material under the name Belladonna and performs with cover projects (including a Journey tribute band). He is a six-time Grammy nominee and was voted No. 1 metal singer two years running by Metal Forces magazine.

== Early life ==
Belladonna was born Joseph Bellardini in Oswego, New York. Belladonna began singing as a teenager in Oswego, performing at his 7th and 8th grade graduations, and later in his high school choir, which he has described as his only formal vocal experience.

== Career ==
=== Early career ===
Throughout the late 1970s and early 1980s, Belladonna fronted local and regional cover bands in upstate New York, focusing on classic rock and hard rock material by artists such as Rush, Van Halen, Triumph, Journey, and Rainbow. One of these early groups was called Blitzkrieg. These club and local gigs helped him develop the strong, melodic tenor style that later defined his work.

=== Bible Black ===
In 1983, Belladonna, still using his birth name, became the vocalist for the band Bible Black, founded by Craig Gruber and Gary Driscoll (former members of Elf and Rainbow) and Andrew "Duck" MacDonald (who later joined Blue Cheer). Belladonna's predecessors in the band were Jeff Fenholt, who later had brief stints with Black Sabbath and Joshua, and Louis Marullo, aka Eric Adams, who left to join Manowar. Belladonna recorded the songs "Deceiver" and "Midnight Dance" with Bible Black. The band never officially released an album.

=== Anthrax ===
==== Auditioning for Anthrax and Spreading the Disease (1985) ====
In early 1984, Belladonna auditioned for Anthrax after the band fired original vocalist Neil Turbin shortly after the recording of their debut album Fistful of Metal. Belladonna had never heard of the band prior to auditioning and didn’t even know what style of music the band played. Despite this he still managed to impress the band during his audition and got the job.

The Armed and Dangerous EP marked Belladonna's recording debut with Anthrax in 1985. Anthrax's second album Spreading the Disease was released in October 1985. It became the band's first album to reach the Billboard 200 peaking at number 113 and was well-received as both a technical leap forward from Fistful of Metal and as a more original effort, and remains one of the band's most highly regarded albums. With leftover studio time from these sessions, Ian, Benante and former bandmate Dan Lilker collaborated with vocalist Billy Milano to form the side project Stormtroopers of Death, and recorded the album Speak English or Die in three days. It was released in August 1985 and is now considered a pioneering crossover thrash release, featuring one of the earliest examples of a blast beat on record. Afterwards, the project was put on hold as Ian and Benante turned their focus back on Anthrax.

The US tour to support Spreading the Disease opening for Black Sabbath was canceled after four dates due to Sabbath singer Glenn Hughes' voice problems. In April 1986, Anthrax attempted its first tour of Europe beginning in Bochum, Germany, supported by Overkill and Agent Steel. The tour included a show near Chernobyl, Ukraine, immediately after the Chernobyl disaster. Later that year, Anthrax toured Europe with Metallica. The tour began on September 10 at St David's Hall and ended on September 26 in Solnahallen, Sweden. The Swedish show was Anthrax's last performance before the bus accident the following day, which killed Metallica bassist Cliff Burton.

==== Among the Living (1987), State of Euphoria (1988), and commercial success ====
The band's third studio album Among the Living was released in March 1987, and is often considered by both the band and critics to be a major breakthrough for Anthrax. Produced by Eddie Kramer, it showcased the band's humorous, experimental side and began a lyrical trend focusing on movies, politics, comic books and Stephen King novels. The album was dedicated to Cliff Burton's memory. Propelled by the singles "Indians" and "I Am the Law", the success of Among the Living not only turned Anthrax into a household name (along with the remaining "Big Four" of thrash metal–Metallica, Megadeth and Slayer), but eventually earned them one of their first certified-gold records by the RIAA. "I Am the Law", which was released as the album's second single, was backed with a rap-metal hybrid "I'm the Man" as its B-side. Anthrax further indulged its appreciation for rap by appearing on the title track of U.T.F.O.'s album, Lethal, and their worship for the genre was also attributed to Ian wearing a t-shirt of Public Enemy both on stage and for publicity photo shoots; in response, Public Enemy name-checked Anthrax in the lyrics to their 1988 single "Bring the Noise". Anthrax toured for over a year to promote Among the Living, touring Europe again with Metallica, the United States with Metal Church, Testament, D.R.I., Exodus and Celtic Frost, and supporting Kiss on their Crazy Nights tour.

Anthrax released their fourth album State of Euphoria in September 1988, and it was produced by Mark Dodson, who had previously worked with Judas Priest, U.D.O. and Metal Church. While the album was not quite as well-received as Among the Living, owing to its "rushed" finish, State of Euphoria was certified gold about five months after its release, and one of the singles "Antisocial", originally by French heavy metal band Trust, became an MTV staple as part of the rotation on Headbangers Ball. By 1989, Anthrax was starting to play at arenas as a headlining or opening act, first supporting Ozzy Osbourne on his No Rest for the Wicked tour in North America, and then headlining European tours with Living Colour, Suicidal Tendencies and King's X, and the U.S. Headbangers Ball Tour with Exodus and Helloween. Also in 1989, MTV sponsored a contest in which the winner had her home trashed by the band. This would later inspire Anthrax's 1992 appearance on the television series Married... with Children, in which the Bundys win a similar TV contest.

==== Persistence of Time (1990), Attack of the Killer B's (1991), and firing ====
Anthrax returned to the studio at the end of 1989 to work on their fifth album, again with Dodson as the producer. Released in August 1990, Persistence of Time was written and recorded during a period of turmoil for Anthrax, as Ian had recently been divorced from his first wife, and the middle of the recording session was interrupted by a fire that caused the band to lose more than $100,000 worth of gear and their rehearsal studio. The band members also claimed it was during this period that there were talks of potentially working with a different singer, a situation that Belladonna was unaware of at the time. Considered by fans to be their serious effort, Persistence of Time was darker, more technical and more progressive than the band's previous work, striking a chord with metal fans wary of Anthrax's "silly" side. The most successful single from the album was a cover of Joe Jackson's "Got the Time", which Jackson said he enjoyed. Persistence of Time was certified gold by the RIAA in early 1991, and the band toured for nearly two years to promote the album, opening for Iron Maiden on their No Prayer for the Dying tour in Europe and North America, and appearing on the Clash of the Titans tour with Megadeth, Slayer and opening act Alice in Chains. Persistence of Time also garnered the band their first Grammy Award nomination for Best Metal Performance at the 33rd Annual Grammy Awards however it lost to Metallica's cover of "Stone Cold Crazy".

In 1991, Anthrax collaborated with Public Enemy on a version of "Bring the Noise". This was a hit, and a successful tour with Public Enemy followed. Joey Belladonna has spoken positively overall about Anthrax’s collaboration with Public Enemy on "Bring the Noise", while noting he was somewhat sidelined during the initial planning. In interviews, Belladonna has said Scott Ian largely kept the idea under wraps at first. While the band was rehearsing for Persistence of Time, Ian played a riff and described it as "just something we’re working on". Shortly afterward, Chuck D and Flavor Flav showed up in the studio. Belladonna recalled "I was kinda in the dark with it all. That part of it did suck, but the outcome was great." He also noted that he had never even heard Public Enemy's original version of the song until after the collaboration was underway. He preferred singing melodic parts over rapping and contributed more as a DJ/turntablist on the track and in the video rather than delivering dense rap verses. He later described the finished song as "a cool surprise" adding that it was "strong... heavy... (with) a neat vibe, and it sure took off". Looking back, he has expressed enjoyment of the experience "I love jamming with Public Enemy... It's super cool and you can't deny the fans having so much fun with that stuff". In a 1991 interview during the joint tour, he supported the pairing saying the band "just felt the need for it" after doing the song and video, and that they wanted to mix things up beyond pure metal tours. "Bring the Noise" has been a live staple for Anthrax since they first played it in concert in 1989. The compilation Attack of the Killer B's was released in 1991, and featured three tracks from their 1989 EP Penikufesin, a new version of "I'm the Man" and a cover of "Bring the Noise" on which Ian did some vocals. The compilation earned the band their second Grammy Award nomination for Best Metal Performance at the 34th Annual Grammy Awards.

In early 1992, shortly after reportedly signing a $10 million record deal with Elektra Records and following their appearance in Married... with Children, Belladonna was fired from Anthrax over creative and stylistic differences. After firing Belladonna, the remaining members of Anthrax auditioned several vocalists including Mark Osegueda of Death Angel and Spike Xavier of Mind Over Four. However, Armored Saint vocalist John Bush was the standout favorite and had in fact been floated as a potential replacement for Belladonna a few years earlier, due to questions about his reliability stemming from drug and alcohol abuse. Guitarist Scott Ian later reflected on what led to Belladonna’s original replacement in 1992, stating "there was never anything personal with Joey it was never personal with him. It just really came down to the creative ability for the band, honestly, to move forward. And I hate that it's something that happened." After he was replaced, Belladonna spent the next decade touring in minivans playing drums and singing in cover bands.

==== Classic lineup reunion ====
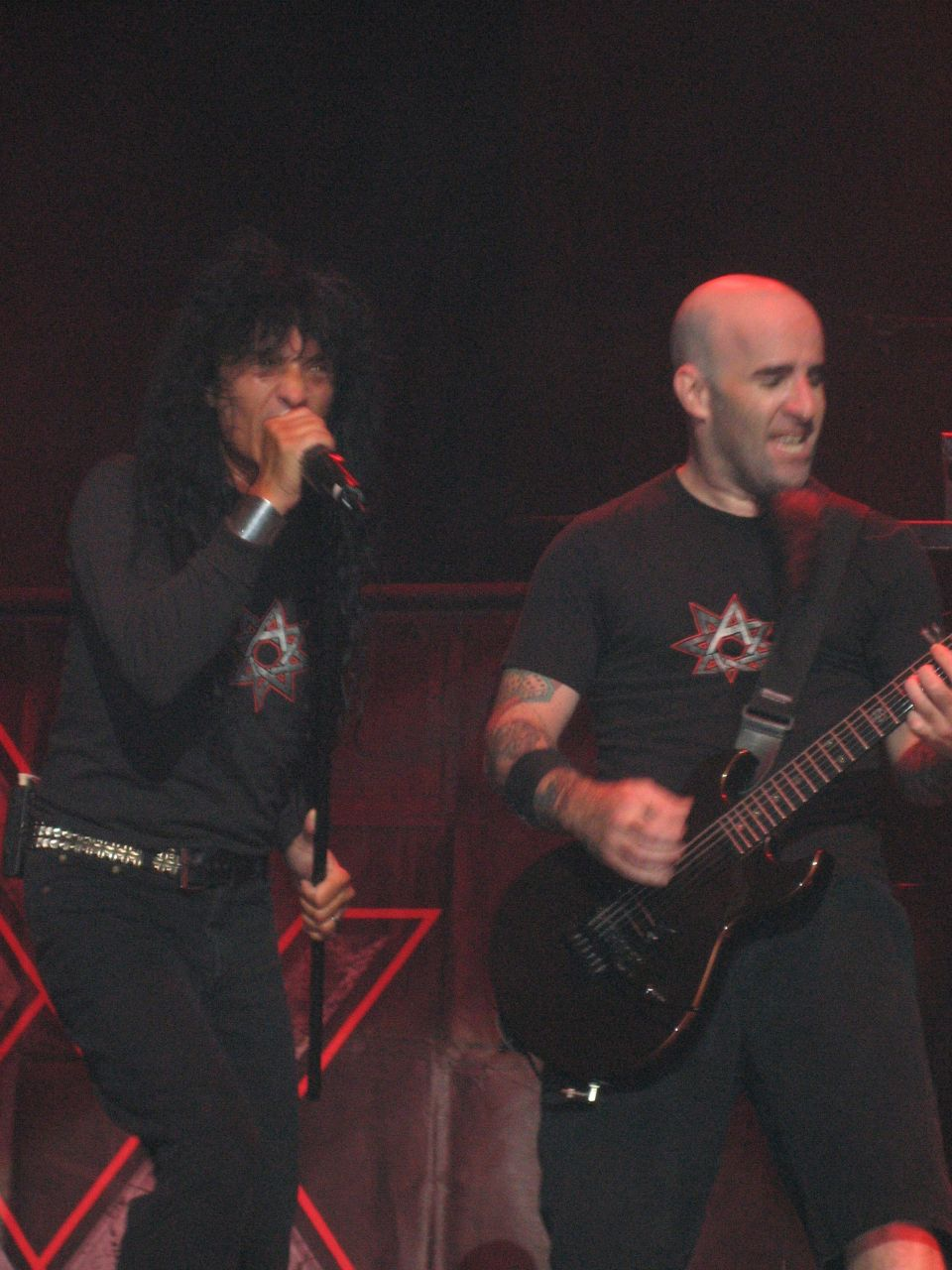
Belladonna (left) and Scott Ian performing with Anthrax in 2005

In April 2005, Anthrax announced that the "classic" lineup of Scott Ian, Charlie Benante, Dan Spitz, Joey Belladonna and Frank Bello would reform. The idea originated with drummer Charlie Benante during a European tour in the summer of 2004. He suggested reuniting the classic lineup as a special anniversary event. After the band changed management, the plan moved forward quickly. Band members later said the reunion came together easily with no pressure or arm-twisting - everyone involved wanted to do it primarily for fun and to commemorate that era of the band rather than for financial reasons. The reunion was publicly confirmed in early 2005 (a press conference and radio appearance took place around April 1). The first U.S. shows occurred at the end of April/beginning of May 2005 (starting in Detroit and Chicago). The band then undertook an extensive world tour through 2005 and into 2006, playing festivals and headline dates in North America, Europe, Australia, and elsewhere (including Download, Graspop, Sweden Rock, and others). Setlists focused heavily on classic material from the Belladonna era (Spreading the Disease, Among the Living, State of Euphoria, Persistence of Time, etc.). During the tour the band recorded the live album and DVD Alive 2 (released in 2005), which documented both the reunion performances and some behind-the-scenes footage of the members reuniting.

Although the lineup was expected to record a new album after the tour, in January 2007 Ian said that Belladonna had not agreed to a reunion. The reunion was temporary. It effectively ended in early 2007 when Belladonna and Spitz again departed. In later interviews (including comments from Charlie Benante), members reflected that while the shows were enjoyable, the 2005 reunion felt somewhat forced or done for external reasons rather than fully repairing personal relationships first-contrasting it with the more organic full-time return of Belladonna in 2010. Belladonna later found out that he had been replaced again by Dan Nelson on the internet.

==== Worship Music (2011), and For All Kings (2016) ====
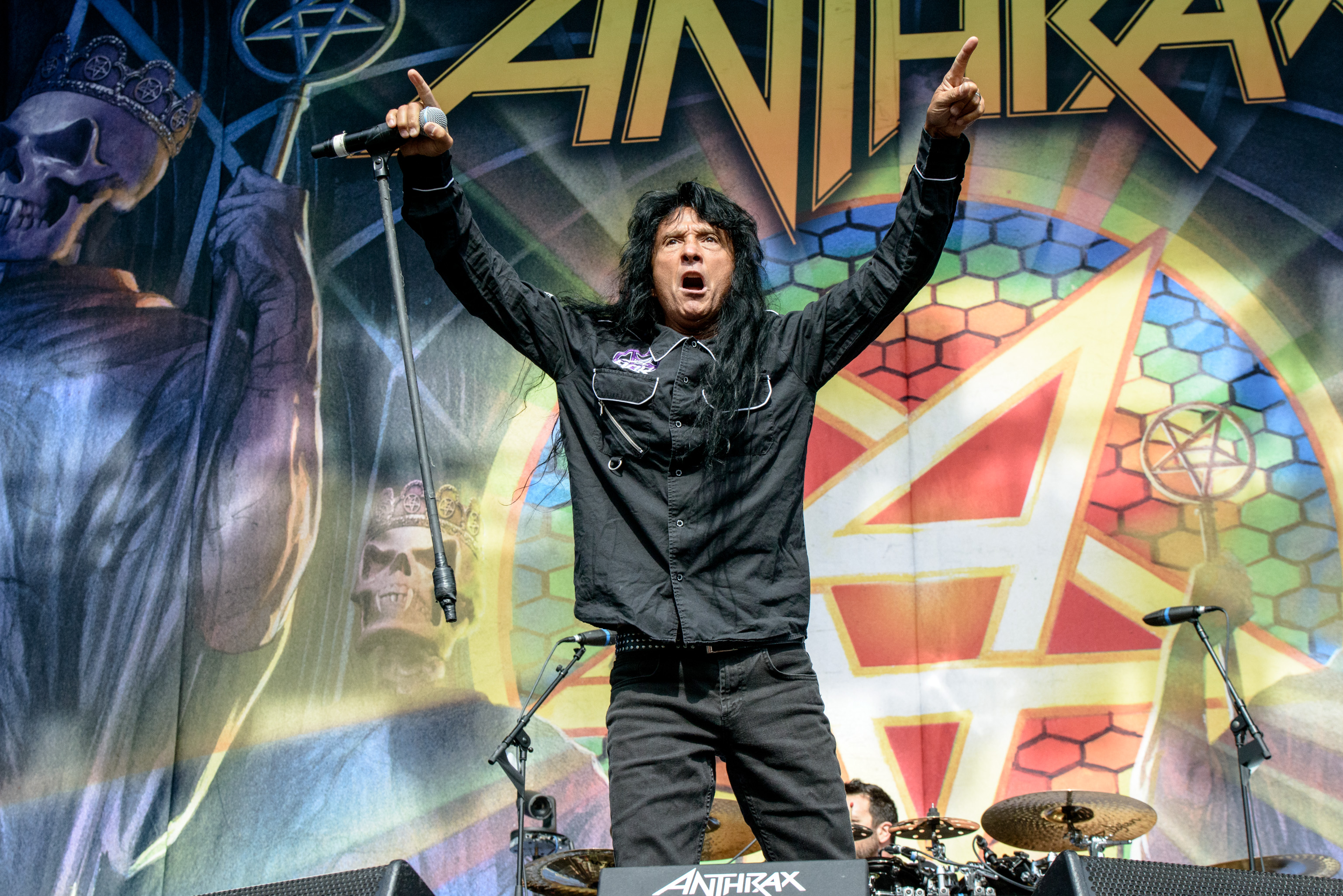
Belladonna with Anthrax in 2016

In late 2009, Anthrax confirmed their participation in several "Big Four" concerts with Metallica, Megadeth and Slayer as part of the 2010 Sonisphere Festival dates in Europe. Then vocalist John Bush decided that he did not want to commit to the band full-time, and left Anthrax for the second time. Belladonna returned to the band in early 2010 for the Sonisphere dates as well as committing to record a new studio album with the band. In June 2010 Anthrax, Metallica, Megadeth and Slayer performed on the same bill for the first time ever at seven Sonisphere shows.

In April 2011, Belladonna fronted Anthrax as they headlined in the Philippines for the first time at the annual Pulp Summer Slam with Death Angel and Hellyeah. The band also headlined the Jägermeister side stage at the Mayhem Festival of 2012, co-headlined by Slayer and Slipknot, and toured with Testament and Death Angel. In June Anthrax released the single "Fight 'Em 'Til You Can't" from the then-upcoming new album on their website as a free download to thank fans for their patience in waiting several years for new material. Worship Music was released on September 12, 2011, and debuted at No. 12 on the Billboard 200, their highest chart position since Sound of White Noise in 1993.

In March, Anthrax released the Anthems EP featuring cover versions of 1970s rock songs as well as two new versions of the song "Crawl" from Worship Music. During the Spring they headlined the Metal Alliance tour with bands such as Exodus, Municipal Waste and High on Fire serving as support. Anthrax released a live DVD, Chile on Hell in 2014 which featured the band's 2013 performance at the Teatro Caupolican in Santiago, Chile. In early 2015, the band confirmed that they had recorded new material and embarked on a tour with Volbeat.

Belladonna, with Anthrax began 2016 with a short US tour with Lamb of God and released their eleventh studio album For All Kings on February 26, 2016. The album debuted on the Billboard 200 charts at number 9, surpassing the number 12 debut of Worship Music. In March, they opened for Iron Maiden on the Latin American leg of their The Book of Souls World Tour. The band released the live album and DVD Kings Among Scotland in April 2018 which was recorded during their Glasgow, Scotland show on the For All Kings tour. Anthrax spent the summer playing festivals in Europe before embarking on a fall US and Canadian tour with Slayer and Death Angel. The band continued to tour within the next two years, embarking on The Killthrax Tour with Killswitch Engage twice (in 2017 and 2018), and along with Lamb of God, Behemoth, Testament, Napalm Death and Obituary, they supported Slayer on their final world tour from May to December 2018.

On February 1, 2017, the band embarked on the 70,000 Tons of Metal cruise. They played two sets and became the first of the "Big Four" to attend the open seas festival. During the theater set, they played a cover of Stormtroopers of Death's "March of the S.O.D." and debuted the song "Blood Eagle Wings". The band's recording of "Antisocial" was prominently featured in the 2017 movie It but was not included on its official soundtrack release.

Anthrax - alongside Testament, Corrosion of Conformity, Armored Saint, DevilDriver, John 5, Doro and Metal Church – participated in Megadeth's first-ever cruise called "Megacruise", which took place in October 2019. They resumed live activity during the summer and fall of 2021, with a livestream performance that saw the band celebrate its 40th anniversary, as well as appearances at U.S. festivals such as Aftershock and Welcome to Rockville.

==== COVID-19 hiatus and Cursum Perficio (2026) ====
Although 2021 marked the band's 40th anniversary, the planned global anniversary tour was delayed due to travel complications arising from the COVID-19 pandemic; instead, the band performed a livestream concert on July 16 of that year. The tour was delayed to 2022, with a North American leg beginning on July 16 with Black Label Society and Hatebreed as support, followed by a European tour to begin on September 27 with Municipal Waste, and then they toured North America again in January and February 2023 with Black Label Society and Exodus. The band also released the full livestream setlist as a live album under the title XL on July 15, 2022. Anthrax continued performing live within the next few years, including co-headlining a European tour with Kreator in November and December 2024, with Testament as the opening act. Original Anthrax bassist Dan Lilker performed with the band for the first time in 40 years during their spring 2024 tour of South America and at a few festival shows in the U.S., filling in for Bello, who was unable to perform due to "personal reasons".

Along with Metallica, Slayer, Pantera, Alice in Chains and Mastodon, the band served as one of the opening acts of Black Sabbath's one-off reunion show at Villa Park on July 5, 2025. This gig marked the first time in nearly fifteen years, since the "Big Four" concert series, that Anthrax had shared the stage together with both Metallica and Slayer.

After years of false starts and stops, Belladonna began recording his vocals on November 5, 2023, and production of the album continued within another two years. By mid 2025, Belladonna said that he had "maybe two or three more" songs left to record. The band announced two months later that the album would be released on September 18, 2026, with the first single "It's for the Kids" to be released on May 15.

Prior to the release of Cursum Perficio, the band (along with Exodus) opened for Megadeth on the Canadian leg of their final tour in February and March 2026, and they also supported Iron Maiden on select dates to the North American leg of their Run for Your Lives World Tour that fall.

=== Solo career ===
==== Belladonna (1995) and Spells of Fear (1998) ====
After his departure from Anthrax in 1992, Belladonna continued to make music in 'Belladonna', a solo project of which he has been the only consistent member. In the mid-1990s, Belladonna released its self-titled debut album, which was well received by both critics and fans alike. The second album, Spells of Fear, was released in 1998 and was heavily criticized for bad production and poor musicianship. Demo recordings of a third album, which was never professionally mastered, were self-released by the band in 2003. It was a return to better songwriting and musicianship and like the debut album it was well received by the fans.

When asked whether he plans to release any more solo material in the future despite having re-joined Anthrax as a full-time member, Belladonna responded with:

"Yeah definitely. I'm working on some stuff and I have almost a full record worth of material sitting right here which is very well demoed up but it is still far from done in its own way. I just keep running out of time whether someone's schedule is messed up or whatever it is happening at the time and it's unfortunate. Now of course Anthrax is back on the go so I just don't have the time to sit for hours with the material but there is definitely some cool metal here. By the time I get to do these songs I'll probably have a fresh batch of ideas and songs to put on top of those. (...) I'd like to put another record out some day, put something out that I can again call my own as I have some great ideas."

=== Other projects ===
Belladonna also plays drums and sings lead vocals in a cover band named Chief Big Way which features mainly classic rock hits from the 1970s and 80s. The band, based around Syracuse, New York, plays small neighborhood bars. He also sings in a Journey cover band called Beyond Frontiers.

In August 2025, Belladonna and his band went on a tour of Florida playing cover songs in tribute of Ronnie James Dio.

== Style and influences ==
In his youth, Joey Belladonna looked up to bands such as the Beatles, Led Zeppelin, Kansas and Rush; bands that Belladonna said created "stuff that was very intricate but yet catchy and hooky you know, with great vocals."

Belladonna is known for his powerful and operatic voice. He noted that when he first joined Anthrax the band wasn't quite his style, however after a couple of days he was able to adjust his voice to fit the music. Belladonna claims that he has never tried to be like any other singer stating "I did listen and favor a lot of musicians, just because I just love the way they do it, but I don't sound like any of 'em. I can do a lot of 'em, but I don't sound like [them]; that's just not me. When I sing my own stuff, I have my own style and it makes it recognizable."

== Legacy and awards ==
Joey Belladonna is best known as the lead vocalist of Anthrax during ther commercial peak, helping establish the band as one of the cornerstone acts of thrash metal's "Big Four".

Belladonna, with Anthrax, has been nominated for a Grammy in the Best Metal Performance category six times. He was also voted number one metal singer two years in a row by British magazine Metal Forces.

== Personal life ==
Joey Belladonna is of Italian American descent on his father’s side and has Native American (Iroquois) ancestry on his mother’s side. He has spoken about feeling a sentimental connection to his maternal heritage, though he has noted that he does not regularly practice its traditions.

He is married to Krista Belladonna. During the period after his first departure from Anthrax in the early 1990s, the couple worked together for a time in maintenance roles at a horse farm.

Belladonna has long maintained ties to upstate New York. He lived in Oswego into adulthood before later basing himself in the Syracuse area. He has generally kept a low public profile.

== Discography ==
=== Anthrax ===
- Spreading the Disease (1985)
- Among the Living (1987)
- State of Euphoria (1988)
- Persistence of Time (1990)
- Worship Music (2011)
- For All Kings (2016)
- Cursum Perficio (2026)

=== Belladonna ===
- Belladonna (1995)
- Spells of Fear (1998)
- 03 (2003)
- Artifacts I (2004)
- Artifacts 2 (2006)

== Other media ==
Joey Belladonna made his film debut as the character Sid Snyder in the 1988 horror film Pledge Night. Sid Snyder is the killer in the film who is deformed by acid as part of hazing tragedy. Belladonna only plays the pre-deformation version of the character.

In 1992, Belladonna appeared on Married... with Children along with Anthrax.
