= Parasite (song) =

Song by Kiss

from the album Hotter than Hell
- Released: October 22, 1974
- Recorded: August 1974
- Genre: Heavy metal; proto-punk; speed metal
- Length: 3:02
- Label: Casablanca Records
- Songwriter: Ace Frehley
- Producers: Kenny Kerner and Richie Wise

"Parasite" is a song by American rock band Kiss, released in 1974 on their second studio album, Hotter Than Hell. As one of the album's heaviest songs, it was performed on the following tour, but dropped from the band's setlist on the Destroyer Tour and not played again until the Revenge Tour in 1992.

== Composition ==
"Parasite" is one of three songwriting contributions from Ace Frehley on the album, the others being "Strange Ways" and "Comin’ Home." He was insecure about his singing ability, so passed that duty to Gene Simmons. Known for its simple but heavily distorted repeated broken chord riff, the song is a departure from the band's glam rock style. Loudwire writer Eduardo Rivadavia opined the song displayed "blue-collar, dare we say proto-punk, greatness," while Spectrum Culture journalist Will Pinfold called it a "proto-metal/grunge masterpiece" with a hint of groove in its fast-but-imprecise riffing. Classic Rock Music writer Todd Whitesel also described "Parasite" as "the coming of speed metal about 10 years before its actual arrival".

== Album appearances ==
- Hotter Than Hell - studio version
- Gold - studio version
- Kiss Chronicles: 3 Classic Albums - studio version
- Kiss Alive! 1975–2000 - Alive! version
- Ikons - studio version
- Kiss Alive 35 - live version

== Personnel ==
- Gene Simmons – lead vocals
- Ace Frehley – lead guitar, bass, backing vocals
- Paul Stanley – rhythm guitar (disputed), backing vocals
- Peter Criss – drums, backing vocals

== Cover versions ==
- Anthrax's version first appeared as the B-side of their 1989 single "Antisocial" and also appears on their EP Penikufesin (also from 1989). It was re-released on the 1991 compilation album Attack of the Killer B's and 1994 live album Live: The Island Years.
- Sebastian Bach covered the song on his 2004 live video Forever Wild.
- Ace Frehley recorded an updated version for his 2016 covers album, Origins, Vol. 1.
- Amphetamine Reptile recording artists Mog Stunt Team cover the song on their 1997 album King of the Retards.
