= Inside Out (EP) =

EP by Anthrax
- Released: September 26, 1998 (Japan); October 2, 1998 (UK)
- Genre: Alternative metal; groove metal
- Length: 16:14
- Label: Ignition Records
- Producer: Anthrax

Anthrax chronology
Volume 8: The Threat Is Real (1998)	Inside Out (1998)	Return of the Killer A's (1999)

Inside Out is an EP by American heavy metal band Anthrax, released in 1998 via Ignition Records, following the release of their album Volume 8: The Threat Is Real.

== Track listing ==
=== Japanese edition ===
1. "Inside Out" (John Bush, Scott Ian, Charlie Benante) – 5:35
2. "Snap / I'd Rather Be Sleeping (D.R.I. cover)" (Kurt Brecht, Spike Cassidy, John Menor, Eric Brecht) – 2:16
3. "Phantom Lord (Metallica cover)" (James Hetfield, Dave Mustaine, Lars Ulrich) – 4:30
4. "The Bends" (Radiohead cover) (Jonny Greenwood, Colin Greenwood, Ed O'Brien, Phil Selway, Thom Yorke) – 3:53

=== UK edition ===
1. "Inside Out" (Bush, Ian, Benante) – 5:33
2. "Giving the Horns" (Bush, Ian, Benante) – 3:35
3. "The Bends" (Greenwood, Greenwood, O'Brien, Selway, Yorke) – 3:52

== Personnel ==
- John Bush – lead vocals
- Scott Ian – guitar, backing vocals
- Frank Bello – bass, backing vocals
- Charlie Benante – drums, additional guitar, percussion
- Dimebag Darrell – lead guitar on "Inside Out"

== Charts ==
Chart (1998)	Peak position
UK (OCC)	95
