= Only (Anthrax song) =

Single by Anthrax

from the album Sound of White Noise
- Released: June 24, 1993
- Recorded: 1992
- Genre: Heavy metal; groove metal; grunge
- Length: 4:56
- Label: Elektra Records
- Songwriters: John Bush, Scott Ian, Frank Bello, Charlie Benante

Anthrax singles chronology
"Bring the Noise" (1991)	"Only" (1993)	"Room for One More" (1993)

Music video
- Anthrax "Only" on YouTube

"Only" is a song by American heavy metal band Anthrax off their 1993 album Sound of White Noise. It is one of band's most popular songs from the John Bush era, and has also appeared on their compilation album, Return of the Killer A's. The song is similar stylistically to that of Alice in Chains, with whom Anthrax had toured with almost 2 years prior to the single's release. Metallica frontman James Hetfield called "Only" "a perfect song".

== Personnel ==
- John Bush – lead vocals
- Dan Spitz – lead guitar
- Scott Ian – rhythm guitar, backing vocals
- Frank Bello – bass, backing vocals
- Charlie Benante – drums

== Single ==
The song was issued as a two-CD set featuring alternate color schemes of the single's artwork, one the regular color and the other would be green. It was also issued on picture disc and as a maxi single.

Track listing (part 2 of a 2-CD set)

- 1. "Only (LP Mix)"
- 2. "Auf Wiedersehen" (Cheap Trick cover)
- 3. "Noisegate"

Track listing (maxi single, picture disc, CD 1)

- 1. "Only (Radio Edit)"
- 2. "Cowboy Song" (Thin Lizzy cover)
- 3. "Sodium Pentathol"

* "Sodium Pentathol" also appears on the album Sound of White Noise and is labeled "C_{11} H_{17} N_{2} O_{2} S Na" there.

== Charts ==
Chart (1993)	Peak position
Australia (ARIA)	101
Netherlands (Single Top 100)	48
Finnish Singles (The Official Finnish Charts)	27
UK Singles (OCC)	36
US Mainstream Rock (Billboard)	26
