= Pledge Night =

1988 American slasher film

- Promotional release poster
- Directed by: Paul Ziller
- Written by: Joyce Snyder
- Produced by: Joyce Snyder
- Starring: Todd Eastland; Shannon McMahon; Joey Belladonna; Will Kempe
- Cinematography: Paul Smith
- Edited by: Paul Ziller
- Music by: Anthrax
- Production company: Scarlet Productions
- Distributed by: Shapiro-Glickenhaus Entertainment
- Release date: 1988
- Running time: 86 minutes
- Country: United States
- Language: English
- Budget: $200,000

Pledge Night is a 1988 American supernatural slasher comedy film directed and edited by Paul Ziller and written and produced by Joyce Snyder. Its plot follows a college fraternity that falls victim to the wrath of a deceased pledge named Sid, who died during a hazing gone wrong years prior. The film's soundtrack is provided by the American heavy metal band Anthrax, whose lead singer Joey Belladonna appears in the film as a young version of Sid.

== Plot ==
At Phi Up, an American college fraternity, six pledges—Bonner, Goodman, Cagle, Silvera, Bodine and Zahn—prepare themselves for Hell Week, where they will be staying within the fraternity house over a three-day period as part of their initiation. On the day before the start of hell week, Dan, an apparently unstable Phi Up member, stabs fellow brother Rex during a mental breakdown. The other brothers rush Rex to the hospital as brother Chip warns the pledges not to tell anyone else about the incident.

During the first two days of Hell Week, the pledges find themselves going through a series of increasingly painful and humiliating hazing rituals, which involves them eating live worms and raw eggs and carrying cherries with their buttcheeks, amongst other things. Meanwhile, Rex's girlfriend Wendy reveals to Bonner that the incident with Rex was actually staged, and that Dan is only pretending to be crazy in order to scare the other pledges as part of a ruse aiming to test their loyalty to the fraternity. Later, Bonner's mother arrives, asking to meet with her son in private. During their meeting, Bonner's mother reveals that, in 1969, her then-boyfriend Sidney Snyder was accidentally killed during a hazing that took place in the house that Phi Up now resides in. As part of the hazing, Sidney had to lie in a tub filled with cornflakes, coffee grounds, vinegar and soda; however, because someone accidentally put muriatic acid into the mixture, Sidney was seriously burned and quickly died from his injuries.

On the final day of Hell Week, fraternity brother J.D. takes the six pledges to the basement in order to lecture them on the supposed history of college fraternities. Meanwhile, the ghost of Sidney Snyder suddenly arrives in the frat house and murders brother Tom whilst he is alone in an upstairs bathroom. Hearing his screams, J.D. sends Chip to investigate. After finding Tom dead, Chip rushes to call the police, only to encounter Dan, who, having apparently become possessed by Sidney, laughs at Chip before killing him by stabbing him with multiple sharp objects. Dan then proceeds to kill two sorority girls who were working with Wendy in order to prepare food for the brothers and pledges.

J.D., annoyed by Dan's constant hysterical laughter, goes off on his own to confront him, only to find the bodies of Chip and one of the girls. Dan appears and knocks him unconscious before tying him to a shelf. Meanwhile, Wendy, having returned from buying groceries, also finds one of the girls' bodies before rushing into the basement to inform the pledges. Sidney's ghost then bursts from Dan's body and murders J.D. by making a cherry bomb explode in his underwear, which Wendy and the pledges all hear.

Sidney then appears in the basement and murders Cagle before killing Silvera by making his stomach explode. As the survivors try to find a way to escape, Zahn heads off by himself to call the police, but his claims regarding Sidney are dismissed and ignored. Sidney then appears and kills Zahn, and later kills both Goodman and Bodine. With Bonner and Wendy as the last remaining survivors, Sidney confronts the two of them. After Bonner reveals his name to Sidney, however, Sidney (who, throughout the film, is strongly implied to be Bonner's late father) stops and gently touches Bonner's shoulder, explaining that he only murdered the pledges and brothers to "protect" Bonner from the bad influence of the fraternity before fading away.

Some time later, Rex is shown lying in a bunk bed with another girl, to which he bemoans over how Wendy broke up with him to be with Bonner. He and the girl proceed to have sex on the top bunk, not noticing when Sidney sneaks into the room wielding a sword that J.D. had shown off during his lecture. As he positions himself underneath the two lovers, Sidney turns to the audience and laughs menacingly.

== Cast ==
- Todd Eastland as Bonner
- Shannon McMahon as Wendy
- Will Kempe as Sidney Snyder / "Acid Sid"
  - Joey Belladonna as Young Sidney
- Dennis Sullivan as Bodine
- Craig Derrick as Cagle
- David Neal Evans as Goodman
- Robert Lentini as Silvera
- James Davies as Zahn
- Lawton Paseka as J.D.
- Michael T. Henderson as Chip
- Arthur Lundquist as Dan
- Steven Christopher Young as Rex
- Tony Barbieri as Tom
- Barbara Summerville as Bonner's Mom

== Production ==
=== Development ===
The film was initially titled A Hazing in Hell.

=== Filming ===
Pledge Night was filmed at the Delta Phi fraternity house at Rutgers University in New Brunswick, New Jersey.

== Music ==
The film's soundtrack was provided by the American band Anthrax.

== Home media ==
In 2019, Pledge Night was released on Blu-ray and DVD by Vinegar Syndrome.
