= Volume 8: The Threat Is Real =

Studio album by Anthrax
- Released: July 21, 1998
- Recorded: 1998
- Studios: Krusty's Fun House, Yonkers, New York
- Genres: Groove metal; alternative metal
- Length: 63:37
- Labels: Ignition; Tommy Boy
- Producers: Anthrax; Paul Crook

Anthrax chronology
Stomp 442 (1995)	Volume 8: The Threat Is Real (1998)	Inside Out (1998)

Anthrax studio chronology
Stomp 442 (1995)	Volume 8: The Threat Is Real (1998)	We've Come for You All (2003)

Singles from Volume 8: The Threat Is Real
- 1. "Inside Out" Released: 1998; 2. "Crush" Released: 1998; 3. "Piss N Vinegar" Released: 1998; 4. "Born Again Idiot" Released: 1998

Volume 8: The Threat Is Real is the eighth studio album by American thrash metal band Anthrax. The album was released on July 21, 1998, by Ignition Records and debuted at number 118 on the Billboard 200 chart. The record was produced by the band and Paul Crook. It features the song "Crush", which appeared in the video game ATV Offroad Fury for PlayStation 2 and in the game's soundtrack. Other released singles from the album were "Inside Out", "Piss N Vinegar" and "Born Again Idiot".

"Pieces", the hidden track at the end of the album, was written by bassist Frank Bello as a tribute to his brother Anthony who was murdered outside his girlfriend's home in the Bronx on March 25, 1996, by an unidentified assailant. The track features Bello on vocals.

== Reception ==
Professional ratings
Review scores
Source	Rating
AllMusic	2.5/5 stars
Collector's Guide to Heavy Metal	7/10
Encyclopedia of Popular Music	3/5 stars
Rock Hard	9.0/10

Stephen Thomas Erlewine, in a mixed review for AllMusic, wrote that the album is a continuation of the band's "writing slump" which started with 1993's Sound of White Noise. He said that there aren't many "memorable songs" on the record, and went to call it "transitional album" leading the band to "new, uncharted territory". Stephen Thompson of The A.V. Club found the album to be "aggressive to the point of being exhausting". Martin Popoff in his Collector's Guide to Heavy Metal remarks how the band put a bit of everything in the songs, including multiple speeds, "humor scattered here and there", "big grungy guitars", "meat and potatoes riffing and roaring vocals from Bush", while "experimenting with some different textures and dynamics". The result is not just "an accessible thrash metal record", as is typical with Anthrax.

In his 2014 autobiography I'm the Man: The Story of that Guy from Anthrax, Scott Ian said "I'm still proud of the songs we wrote for Volume 8: The Threat is Real. They were really diverse and heavy, modern sounding with a crushing metal groove. 1998 is the year nu metal took over but we were definitely not a part of that scene. If anything we were old metal, so getting anyone to support us was proving difficult."

== Track listing ==
All lyrics written by Scott Ian and John Bush; all music by Charlie Benante, except where noted.

No.	Title	Music	Length
1.	"Crush"		4:21
2.	"Catharsis"	Benante, Frank Bello	4:53
3.	"Inside Out"		5:31
4.	"Piss N Vinegar"		3:12
5.	"604"	Benante, Ian	0:35
6.	"Toast to the Extras"		4:24
7.	"Born Again Idiot"		4:17
8.	"Killing Box"		3:37
9.	"Harms Way"	Benante, Ian	5:13
10.	"Hog Tied"		4:36
11.	"Big Fat"	Benante, Ian	6:01
12.	"Cupajoe"	Benante, Ian	0:46
13.	"Alpha Male"		3:05
14.	"Stealing from a Thief" (ends at 5:33, hidden track "Pieces" begins at 8:03 after 2:30 of silence)	Bello ("Pieces")	13:06
Total length:			63:37

Bonus tracks
No.	Title	Writer(s)	Length
15.	"Giving the Horns"		3:34
16.	"The Bends" (Radiohead cover)	Jonny Greenwood, Colin Greenwood, Ed O'Brien, Phil Selway, Thom Yorke	3:52
17.	"Snap/I'd Rather Be Sleeping" (Dirty Rotten Imbeciles cover)	Kurt Brecht, Spike Cassidy, John Menor, Eric Brecht	2:17
Total length:			73:20

== Credits ==
All personnel credits for Volume 8: The Threat Is Real are adapted from the album's liner notes.

Anthrax

- John Bush – vocals
- Scott Ian – guitars; whammy guitar (7); transformer scratch (8); vocals (12); whammy lead (13); guitar harmony (14); collage photos
- Frank Bello – bass; vocals on "Pieces"
- Charlie Benante – drums, guitars, acoustic guitar, percussion; tom army (1); guitar solos (2, 4); blues harp (6); Theremin (8); lead guitar, slide guitar (9); talk box (10); Tremelo guitar (11); first guitar solo (13); guitar harmony (14); art concept, collage photos

Guests musicians

- Dave Ferma – tom army (1)
- Dimebag Darrell – guitar solos (3, 7)
- Phil Anselmo – backing vocals (8)
- Paul Crook – guitar solos on (8, 10, 11, 14); co-production, engineering

Production

- Anthrax – production
- Chris Sheldon – mixing
- Phil Shatran – assistant mix engineer

Creative

- Tim Gabor – art direction & illustrations, art concept
- Mark Weiss – collage photos, individual photos
- Gene Ambo – collage photos
- Bill Philputt – collage photos
- Brian Smale – inlay band photo

== Charts ==
Chart (1998)	Peak position
German Albums (Offizielle Top 100)	43
Finnish Albums (Suomen virallinen lista)	38
Japanese Albums (Oricon)	16
UK Albums (Official Charts)	73
UK Independent Albums (Official Charts)	9
UK Rock & Metal Albums (Official Charts)	2
US Billboard 200	118
