= Répression =

Studio album by Trust
- Released: 1980
- Recorded: 1979–1980
- Genre: Hard rock; heavy metal
- Label: Epic; CBS Disques
- Producer: Trust; Dennis Weinrich

Trust chronology
Trust I (1979)	Répression (1980)	Repression (English version) (1980)

Répression is the second studio album by French hard rock/metal band Trust. It was released in 1980 (in France) and was dedicated to Bon Scott, the recently deceased lead singer of AC/DC; the English version was released to other parts of the world later in the year.

== Track listing ==
- All songs written by Bernard Bonvoisin and Norbert Krief, except "Le Mitard", lyrics by Jacques Mesrine. English version lyrics by Jimmy Pursey.

No.	Title	Length
1.	"Antisocial (Antisocial)"	5:00
2.	"Monsieur Comédie (Mister Comedy)"	3:25
3.	"Au Nom de la Race (In the Name of the Race)"	3:24
4.	"Instinct De Mort (Death Instinct)"	3:40
5.	"Passe (Walk Alone)"	3:45
6.	"Saumur (Paris is Still Burning)"	4:51
7.	"Fatalité (Pick Me Up, Pull Me Down)"	2:50
8.	"Sors Tes Griffes (Get Out Your Claws)"	4:12
9.	"Sectes (Sects)"	2:45
10.	"Le Mitard"	5:14

== Personnel ==
=== Trust ===
- Bernard Bonvoisin: Vocals
- Norbert Krief: Guitars
- Yves Brusco: Bass
- Jeannot Hanela: Drums, Percussion

=== Additional personnel ===
- Bimbo Acok: Sax on track 7

== Charts ==
Chart (1980)	Peak position
French Albums (SNEP)	2

== Certifications ==
Region	Certification	Certified units/sales
France (SNEP)	Platinum	400,000^{*}
^{*} Sales figures based on certification alone.
