= Antisocial (Trust song) =

1980 single by Trust

Single by Trust

from the album Répression
- Released: 1980
- Genre: Heavy metal
- Length: 5:11
- Label: BMG
- Songwriters: Bernie Bonvoisin; Norbert Krief

Trust singles chronology
""Fatalité"" (1980)	"Antisocial" (1980)	""Idéal"" (1983)

"Antisocial" is a song by the French hard rock band Trust, from their album Répression. The song was written by Bernie Bonvoisin and Norbert Krief.

Unusually for a heavy metal track, it was played on mainstream radio stations RTL and France Inter, helping the album sell over 800,000 copies in 1980. Evoking a dehumanised, individualistic and brutal society, the lyrics captured the social alienation of a generation disillusioned by the excesses of its elders and the 1973 oil crisis. According to rock critic Michka Assayas, "Antisocial" is "the hymn that definitely buried the Glorious Thirty".

== Anthrax version ==
"Antisocial"

Single by Anthrax

from the album State of Euphoria
- Released: 1989
- Genre: Thrash metal; speed metal
- Length: 5:41
- Label: Island
- Songwriters: Bernie Bonvoisin; Norbert Krief
- Producers: Anthrax; Mark Dodson

Anthrax singles chronology
"Make Me Laugh" (1988)	"Antisocial" (1989)	"Got the Time" (1990)

Music video
- "Antisocial" on YouTube

Professional ratings
Review scores
Source	Rating
Number One	3/5 stars

American thrash metal band Anthrax covered the song, using the alternate English lyrics, on their 1988 album State of Euphoria. Their cover of the song also appears on the second disc of their compilation album, Anthrology: No Hit Wonders (1985–1991), along with a version featuring the verses sung in French.

Track Listing (international version)

1. "Antisocial" (Trust cover)
2. "Parasite" (Kiss cover)
3. "Le Sects" (Trust cover)

Track Listing (foreign import)

1. "Antisocial" (Trust cover)
2. "Make Me Laugh"
3. "Antisocial (live)" (Trust cover)

Notes

- The artwork for the "Antisocial" single would also later be used for "Penikufesin".
- The foreign import used unique artwork, different from the international version. It showed the "NOT" Man riding on a skateboard spray-painting "Antisocial" onto the side of a wall.
- On the international single, the title of the song on the cover artwork was shown as "Anti-Social".

== Charts for Anthrax version ==
Chart (1989)	Peak position
UK Singles (Official Charts)	44
