= State of Euphoria =

Studio album by Anthrax
- Released: September 19, 1988
- Recorded: April–June 1988
- Studio: Quadradial Studios (Miami, Florida)
- Genre: Thrash metal
- Length: 52:47
- Labels: Megaforce; Island
- Producers: Anthrax; Mark Dodson; Alex Perialas; Jon Zazula; Marsha Zazula

Anthrax chronology
I'm the Man (1987)	State of Euphoria (1988)	Penikufesin (1989)

Anthrax studio chronology
Among the Living (1987)	State of Euphoria (1988)	Persistence of Time (1990)

Singles from State of Euphoria
- 1. "Make Me Laugh" Released: 1988; 2. "Antisocial" Released: March 6, 1989

State of Euphoria is the fourth studio album by the American heavy metal band Anthrax. It was released on September 19, 1988, through Megaforce/Island Records. The album was the follow-up to the band's breakthrough album, Among the Living, and proved to be even more commercially successful, but less critically acclaimed.

== Background and music ==
State of Euphoria was produced by Anthrax and Mark Dodson, with Alex Perialas engineering. Guitarist Scott Ian has been quoted as saying that the band hired Dodson to produce this album because of his work with Judas Priest and Metal Church.

The song "Misery Loves Company" is based on the Stephen King novel Misery, while "Now It's Dark" was inspired by the David Lynch film Blue Velvet, specifically the behavior of the sexually depraved, self-asphyxiating, murderous sociopath Frank Booth, played by Dennis Hopper. The song "Make Me Laugh" is critical of Jim and Tammy Fae Bakker and televangelism in general, a popular target of thrash metal bands of that time. The song specifically mentioned minutiae such as the air-conditioned doghouse and Christian amusement park. Most of the album's music was composed by drummer Charlie Benante while lyrics were composed by rhythm guitarist Scott Ian.

The back cover of the album contains a parody picture of the band drawn by Mort Drucker, a caricaturist best known for his artwork in the magazine Mad.

== Release ==
The album was released on September 19, 1988. It proved to be even more commercially successful than its predecessor, Among the Living, reaching No. 30 on the Billboard 200 chart in late 1988 and was the first time the band charted in Australia and Canada. It was certified Gold by the RIAA on February 8, 1989. The songs "Who Cares Wins", dealing with the plight of the homeless, and "Antisocial" (a cover of the song by the French band Trust) were released as singles with accompanying music videos.

== Reception ==
Professional ratings
Review scores
Source	Rating
AllMusic	2.5/5 stars
Collector's Guide to Heavy Metal	7/10
Encyclopedia of Popular Music	2/5 stars
Metal Forces	10/10
The New Rolling Stone Album Guide	3/5 stars

Critical reception for the album was mediocre upon its release. The album failed to live up to the expectations, set by the band's previous releases, Spreading the Disease, Among the Living and the I'm the Man EP.

Aside from "Be All, End All" and "Antisocial", most of the songs on State of Euphoria have not appeared on the band's live setlists since the album's accompanying tour in 1988–1989. The only songs from this album that have not been played live at least once are "Schism", "Misery Loves Company" and "13". The members of Anthrax have since spoken about their mixed opinions on State of Euphoria, and drummer Charlie Benante has been quoted as saying that the band feels the album was not finished properly.

== Touring and promotion ==
Anthrax spent nearly a year touring in support of State of Euphoria. Prior to the album's release, the band supported Iron Maiden on their Seventh Tour of a Seventh Tour in Europe, and opened for Ozzy Osbourne on his No Rest for the Wicked tour in the United States from November 1988 to January 1989. The band also opened for Metallica on their Damaged Justice tour.

Anthrax continued touring in 1989, playing six shows in the UK with Living Colour in March, and headlining the Headbangers Ball Tour (with support from Helloween and Exodus) in April–May. Following the Headbangers Ball tour, Anthrax toured Europe with Suicidal Tendencies, King's X and M.O.D., which took place in June–July 1989.

== Track listing ==
All tracks are written by Anthrax, except "Antisocial" by Bernie Bonvoisin and Norbert Krief.

Side one
No.	Title	Length
1.	"Be All, End All"	6:22
2.	"Out of Sight, Out of Mind"	5:13
3.	"Make Me Laugh"	5:41
4.	"Antisocial" (Trust cover)	4:27
5.	"Who Cares Wins"	7:35

Side two
No.	Title	Length
6.	"Now It's Dark"	5:34
7.	"Schism"	5:27
8.	"Misery Loves Company"	5:40
9.	"13"	0:49
10.	"Fīnalē"	5:47
Total length:		52:47

== Personnel ==
Anthrax

- Joey Belladonna – lead vocals
- Dan Spitz – lead guitar, backing vocals
- Scott Ian – rhythm guitar, backing vocals
- Frank Bello – bass, backing vocals
- Charlie Benante – drums

Additional musicians

- Carol Freedman – cello

Production

- Anthrax and Mark Dodson – production
- Alex Perialas – engineering, associate production
- Bridget Daly, Paul Speck – assistant engineering
- Jon Zazula and Marsha Zazula – executive production
- Don Brautigam, Mort Drucker – artwork
- Gene Ambo – photography

== Charts ==
Chart (1988–89)	Peak position
Australian Albums (ARIA)	82
Canada Top Albums/CDs (RPM)	87
Dutch Albums (Album Top 100)	57
Finnish Albums (The Official Finnish Charts)	4
German Albums (Offizielle Top 100)	15
Norwegian Albums (VG-lista)	17
Swedish Albums (Sverigetopplistan)	21
Swiss Albums (Schweizer Hitparade)	20
UK Albums (Official Charts)	12
US Billboard 200	30

Chart (2018)	Peak position
Scottish Albums (Official Charts)	100
US Indie Store Album Sales (Billboard)	22

Chart (2024)	Peak position
Greek Albums (IFPI)	59

== Certifications ==
Region	Certification	Certified units/sales
Canada (Music Canada)	Gold	50,000^{^}
United Kingdom (BPI)	Silver	60,000^{^}
United States (RIAA)	Gold	500,000^{^}
^{^} Shipments figures based on certification alone.
