= Headbangers Ball Tour =

1989 concert tour by Anthrax, Exodus and Helloween

Headbangers Ball
- Tour by Anthrax, Exodus, Helloween
- Promotional poster for the tour
- Location: North America
- Associated album: State of Euphoria; Fabulous Disaster; Keeper of the Seven Keys, Pt. 2
- Start date: April 3, 1989
- End date: May 12, 1989
- Legs: 1
- No. of shows: 30

The Headbangers Ball Tour was a North American tour presented by MTV's Headbangers Ball, which took place in April and May 1989. It was headlined by American thrash metal band Anthrax, and supported by Exodus and Helloween.

== History ==
The tour began on April 3, 1989, in Seattle, and ended on May 12, 1989, in Poughkeepsie, New York. Anthrax was promoting their platinum-selling album State of Euphoria, while Exodus and Helloween were promoting their respective albums Fabulous Disaster and Keeper of the Seven Keys, Pt. 2.

The Headbangers Ball Tour is notable for being Exodus' last tour with drummer Tom Hunting, until he rejoined the band in 1997. Due to health problems, Hunting left the band in the middle of the tour and was temporarily replaced by Vio-lence drummer Perry Strickland and then permanently by John Tempesta, who was a drum tech for Anthrax and would remain in Exodus until their breakup in 1993.

MTV and Island Records paired up for a Headbangers Ball Tour contest. The winner was Lori Gutman who lived in Kinnelon, New Jersey. Members of Anthrax and Exodus taped a spot for Headbangers Ball at the winner's home. It aired later that year. The grand prize was a 1989 Jeep Wrangler, $1,000, and some Headbangers Ball swag.

== Tour dates ==
Date	City	Country	Venue
North America
April 3, 1989	Seattle	United States	Paramount Theatre
April 4, 1989	Portland	United States	Civic Auditorium
April 6, 1989	Salt Lake City	United States	The Coliseum
April 8, 1989	Oakland	United States	Kaiser Convention Center
April 9, 1989	Long Beach	United States	Long Beach Arena
April 10, 1989	Phoenix	United States	Pride Pavilion
April 13, 1989	San Antonio	United States	Freeman Coliseum
April 14, 1989	Dallas	United States	State Fair Coliseum
April 15, 1989	Houston	United States	The Coliseum
April 16, 1989	New Orleans	United States	Lakefront Arena
April 18, 1989	Miami	United States	James L. Knight Center
April 19, 1989	Tampa	United States	The Sundome
April 20, 1989	Atlanta	United States	Civic Center
April 21, 1989	Memphis	United States	North Hall Auditorium
April 22, 1989	Louisville	United States	The Gardens
April 25, 1989	Danville	United States	David S. Palmer Arena
April 24, 1989	Dayton	United States	Hara Arena
April 26, 1989	Milwaukee	United States	The Omnibus
April 28, 1989	Chicago	United States	Aragon Ballroom
April 29, 1989	Detroit	United States	Cobo Arena
April 30, 1989	Cleveland	United States	Music Hall
May 1, 1989	Pittsburgh	United States	Syria Mosque
May 3, 1989	Upper Darby Township	United States	Tower Theater
May 4, 1989	Boston	United States	Orpheum Theatre
May 5, 1989	New York City	United States	Felt Forum
May 6, 1989	New York City	United States	Felt Forum
May 8, 1989	Troy	United States	RPI Field House
May 10, 1989	Baltimore	United States	Baltimore Arena
May 11, 1989	Springfield	United States	Springfield Civic Center
May 12, 1989	Poughkeepsie	United States	Mid-Hudson Civic Center

== Personnel ==
Anthrax:

- Joey Belladonna – lead vocals
- Dan Spitz – lead guitar, backing vocals
- Scott Ian – rhythm guitar, backing vocals
- Frank Bello – bass, backing vocals
- Charlie Benante – drums

Exodus:

- Steve "Zetro" Souza – lead vocals
- Gary Holt – guitars, backing vocals
- Rick Hunolt – guitars, backing vocals
- Rob McKillop – bass
- Tom Hunting – drums (April 3–10 shows)
- Perry Strickland – drums (filling in for Hunting on select dates)
- John Tempesta – drums (filling in for Hunting on select dates)

Helloween:

- Michael Kiske – lead vocals
- Michael Weikath – lead guitar, backing vocals
- Roland Grapow – rhythm guitar, backing vocals
- Markus Grosskopf – bass, backing vocals
- Ingo Schwichtenberg – drums
