= Stomp 442 =

Studio album by Anthrax
- Released: October 24, 1995
- Recorded: 1995
- Studio: Studio 4, Conshohocken, Pennsylvania
- Genres: Groove metal; alternative metal
- Length: 50:56
- Labels: Elektra; Warner
- Producers: Anthrax; Butcher Bros.

Anthrax chronology
Live: The Island Years (1994)	Stomp 442 (1995)	Volume 8: The Threat Is Real (1998)

Anthrax studio chronology
Sound of White Noise (1993)	Stomp 442 (1995)	Volume 8: The Threat Is Real (1998)

Singles from Stomp 442
- 1. "Fueled" Released: 1995; 2. "Nothing" Released: 1996

Stomp 442 is the seventh studio album by American heavy metal band Anthrax. It was released in 1995 by Elektra Records. The band and the Philadelphia-based Butcher Brothers produced the album, which includes the singles, "Fueled" and "Nothing". The album debuted at No. 47 on the Billboard 200 charts. The album is their last to be released by Elektra Records, as they left the label after claiming that they did not do enough to promote the album.

Stomp 442 is also Anthrax's first album without Dan Spitz on lead guitar. Though not credited as a member of the band, Paul Crook took over lead guitar duties.

== Cover art ==
The album's cover gained controversy when retailer Walmart refused to stock it in its stores, because of the naked man standing next to the giant ball of garbage.

In a 1996 interview with Tom Russell of Glasgow-based radio Clyde 1, Bruce Dickinson revealed that the original design for the cover art was done for his album Balls to Picasso – originally to be titled Laughing in the Hiding Bush – but he couldn't afford it. His album's title was changed and he drew two squares on a toilet wall for the cover.

== Critical reception ==
Professional ratings
Review scores
Source	Rating
AllMusic	2/5 stars
Christgau's Consumer Guide	(neither)
Collector's Guide to Heavy Metal	8/10
Encyclopedia of Popular Music	2/5 stars
The New Rolling Stone Album Guide	3/5 stars

AllMusic reviewer Stephen Thomas Erlewine described the album as "a generic collection of speed metal bombast". He finished his review by saying that the record is a "disheartening experience." Canadian journalist Martin Popoff labeled Stomp 442 as "a fine, responsible collection of working man's metal, if a bit of a repetition" compared to "the relatively unappreciated Sound of White Noise."

== Track listing ==
All lyrics are written by Scott Ian and John Bush, except "King Size" with Rich Ross; all music composed by Charlie Benante; all melody lines by Ian, Bush, Frank Bello and Benante; all songs arranged by Anthrax (Ian, Benante, Bello, Bush).

No.	Title	Lead guitar	Length
1.	"Random Acts of Senseless Violence"	Paul Crook	4:02
2.	"Fueled"		4:02
3.	"King Size"	Dimebag Darrell	3:58
4.	"Riding Shotgun"	Crook, Darrell	4:25
5.	"Perpetual Motion"		4:18
6.	"In a Zone"	Crook	5:06
7.	"Nothing"	Benante	4:33
8.	"American Pompeii"	Benante, Mike Tempesta	5:30
9.	"Drop the Ball"	Crook	4:59
10.	"Tester"	Benante, Ian	4:21
11.	"Bare"	Benante	5:29
Total length:			50:55

Bonus tracks (2001 remaster)
No.	Title	Writer(s)	Length
12.	"Grunt and Click"	Bush, Ian, Frank Bello, Benante	5:29
13.	"Dethroned Emperor" (Celtic Frost cover)	Tom Fischer	4:32
14.	"Celebrated Summer" (Hüsker Dü cover)	Bob Mould	4:30
15.	"Watchin' You" (Kiss cover)	Gene Simmons	3:38
Total length:			69:04

== Personnel ==
All Personnel credits for Stomp 442 are adapted from the album's liner notes.

Anthrax

- Scott Ian – rhythm guitars, assorted noises, backing vocals; feedback (4); shaker (8); floor tom hits (9); stomping (10); acoustic guitars (11)
- Charlie Benante – drums, guitars, bongos (8), chimes, floor tom hits (9), talkbox, stomping (10), E-Bow, acoustic guitars, percussion (11)
- Frank Bello – 4- and 12-string bass guitars, backing vocals; stomping (10)
- John Bush – lead vocals; stomping (10)

Guest musicians

- Paul Crook – guitar (1, 4, 6, 9); stomping (10)
- Dimebag Darrell – guitar (3, 4))
- Mike Tempesta – guitar (8)
- Zach Throne – stomping (10); guitar ("Celebrated Summer")
- Joe Nicolo – noise (4)

Production

- Butcher Bros. – production, mixing, engineering
- Anthrax – production, mixing
- Dirk Grobelny – engineering
- Ian Cross – engineering
- Mike Monterulo – assistant engineer, key man; stomping (10)
- J.J. Bottari – assistant engineer
- Chris Gately – assistant engineer
- Phil Nowlan – assistant engineer
- Manny Lecuona – editing
- Bob Ludwig – mastering

Creative

- Storm Thorgerson – cover design
- Peter Curzon – cover design
- Tony May – photography
- Rupert Truman – photography
- Kristin Callahan – band photos
- James Payton – ball
- Mark Fraser – artwork

== Charts ==
Chart (1995)	Peak position
Australian Albums (ARIA)	49
Canada Top Albums/CDs (RPM)	81
Finnish Albums (Suomen virallinen lista)	36
Japanese Albums (Oricon)	44
UK Albums (Official Charts)	77
UK Rock & Metal Albums (Official Charts)	10
US Billboard 200	47
