= Bring the Noise =

1987 single by Public Enemy

- Artwork of the UK commercial vinyl single

Single by Public Enemy

from the album It Takes a Nation of Millions to Hold Us Back and Less Than Zero
- A-side: "Are You My Woman?" (by The Black Flames) (US single)
- B-side: "Sophisticated" (UK single)
- Released: December 29, 1987
- Recorded: 1987
- Genre: Hip hop
- Length: 3:45
- Label: Def Jam
- Songwriters: Carl Ridenhour; Hank Shocklee; Eric "Vietnam" Sadler; James Brown; George Clinton
- Producer: The Bomb Squad

Public Enemy singles chronology
"Rebel Without a Pause" (1987)	"Bring the Noise" (1987)	"Don't Believe the Hype" (1988)

"Bring the Noise" is a song by the American hip hop group Public Enemy. It was included on the soundtrack of the 1987 film Less than Zero; the song was also released as a single that year. It later became the first song on the group's 1988 album, It Takes a Nation of Millions to Hold Us Back. The single reached No. 56 on the Billboard Hot R&B/Hip-Hop Songs chart.

The song's lyrics, most of which are delivered by Chuck D with interjections from Flavor Flav, include boasts of Public Enemy's prowess, an endorsement of Nation of Islam leader Louis Farrakhan, retorts to unspecified critics, and arguments for rap as a legitimate musical genre on par with rock. The lyrics also have a metrical complexity, making extensive use of meters like dactylic hexameter. The title phrase appears in the chorus. The song includes several shout-outs to fellow hip hop artists like Run-D.M.C., Eric B, LL Cool J and, unusually for a rap group, Yoko Ono, Sonny Bono and the thrash metal band Anthrax. Anthrax later collaborated with Chuck D to cover the song.

The song's production by the Bomb Squad, which exemplifies their characteristic style, features a dissonant mixture of funk samples, drum machine patterns, record scratching by DJ Terminator X, siren sound effects and other industrial noise.

Critic Robert Christgau has described the song as "postminimal rap refracted through Blood Ulmer and On the Corner, as gripping as it is abrasive, and the black militant dialogue-as-diatribe that goes with it is almost as scary as "Stones in My Passway" or "Holidays in the Sun". "Bring the Noise" was ranked No. 160 on Rolling Stone's list of the 500 greatest songs of all time.

== Samples ==
- "It's My Thing" by Marva Whitney
- "Funky Drummer", "Get Up, Get into It, Get Involved" and "Give It Up or Turnit a Loose" (remix) by James Brown
- "Get Off Your Ass and Jam" by Funkadelic
- "Fantastic Freaks at the Dixie" by DJ Grand Wizard Theodore
- "I Don't Know What This World Is Coming To" by the Soul Children
- "Assembly Line" by Commodores

The recording begins with a sample of Malcolm X's voice saying "Too black, too strong" repeatedly from his public speech at the Northern Negro Grass Roots Leadership Conference on November 10, 1963, in King Solomon Baptist Church in Detroit, Michigan entitled Message to the Grass Roots.

=== As a sample in other songs ===
"Bring the Noise" has been sampled in many other songs; among them "Much More" by De La Soul, "Here We Go Again!" by Portrait, "I Know" by Seo Taiji & Boys, and "World Wide Noise" by ClascyJitto. "Everything I Am" by Kanye West and "Here We Go Again" by Everclear all sample the Chuck D line "Here we go again". His exclamation "Now they got me in a cell" from the first verse of the song is also sampled in the Beastie Boys song "Egg Man". The track "Undisputed", from the 1999 album Rave Un2 The Joy Fantastic by Prince samples Chuck D's voice saying "Once again, back, it's the incredible" in its chorus and also features an appearance from Chuck D himself. This same sample is used on Fat Joe's album All or Nothing on the track "Safe 2 Say (The Incredible)". Rakim's 1997 single "Guess Who's Back" also uses the same sample. The game Sonic Rush samples the beginning of "Bring the Noise" in the music for the final boss battle. In addition, Ludacris' hit "How Low" samples Chuck D's "How low can you go?" line. In 2010, it was sampled by Adil Omar and DJ Solo of Soul Assassins on their single "Incredible". LL Cool J used a sample of Chuck D's line "I want bass" during the final verse on the song "The Boomin' System" from the Mama Said Knock You Out album. Also, the lines "[To save] face, how low can you go" and "[So keep] pace how slow can you go" in Linkin Park's song "Wretches and Kings" on their album A Thousand Suns (which is also produced by Rick Rubin) refer to Chuck D's line "Bass! How low can you go?". Francis Magalona's 1993 songs "Ito ang Gusto Ko" and "Meron Akong Ano" both sample "Bring the Noise".

Additionally, Public Enemy sampled the song themselves in several other songs on It Takes a Nation of Millions to Hold Us Back, including the lines "Now they got me in a cell" and "Death Row/What a brother knows" in "Black Steel in the Hour of Chaos" and the lines "Bass!" and "How low can you go?" in "Night of the Living Baseheads".

== Anthrax version ==
"Bring the Noise"

Single by Anthrax and Public Enemy

from the album Attack of the Killer B's (Anthrax album) and Apocalypse 91... The Enemy Strikes Black (Public Enemy album)
- B-side: "Keep It in the Family" (live); "I'm the Man '91"
- Released: July 9, 1991
- Genre: Rap metal
- Length: 3:34
- Label: Island
- Songwriters: Joey Belladonna; Dan Spitz; Scott Ian; Frank Bello; Charlie Benante; Carl Ridenhour; Hank Shocklee; Eric "Vietnam" Sadler
- Producers: Anthrax; Mark Dodson

Anthrax singles chronology
"In My World" (1990)	"Bring the Noise" (1991)	"Only" (1993)

Music video
- “Bring the Noise” on YouTube

Thrash metal band Anthrax recorded a version of "Bring the Noise", which sampled the vocals from the original Public Enemy recording. Chuck D has stated that upon the initial request of Anthrax, he "didn't take them wholehearted seriously", but after the collaboration was done, "it made too much sense", and it was eventually included on both the Anthrax compilation Attack of the Killer B's and as the final track on Public Enemy's own Apocalypse 91... The Enemy Strikes Black album.

The song's release was followed by a joint-tour featuring the two groups, with shows ending with both groups on stage performing the song together. Chuck D went on to say that shows on the tour were "some of the hardest" they ever experienced, and that at the start of the tour, Anthrax "commenced to destroy, slaughter and wipe the fuckin' stage" with Public Enemy as the opener, forcing the group to not only up the intensity of their set, but to innovate by having a dedicated light board operator - a first in hiphop. According to Chuck D, the show intensities eventually began to even out, and when the two bands joined on stage for "Bring the Noise", "it was shrapnel". Anthrax first played "Bring the Noise" live in 1989, two years before the Public Enemy collaboration was released, and it has been a live staple ever since.

The recording was ranked No. 12 on VH1's 2006 list of the 40 Greatest Metal Songs and is featured in the video games Die Hard Trilogy, WWE SmackDown! vs. RAW, WWE WrestleMania 21, WWE Day of Reckoning, Tony Hawk's Pro Skater 2, Tony Hawk's Pro Skater HD, Tony Hawk's Pro Skater 1 + 2 and Rock Band 4 as DLC.

The title of the Anthrax version is sometimes spelled "Bring tha Noise" or "Bring tha Noize".

=== Single track listing ===
1. "Bring the Noise" – 3:34
2. "Keep It in the Family" (live) – 7:19
3. "I'm the Man '91" – 5:56

== Charts ==
=== Public Enemy version ===
Chart (1988)	Peak position
UK Singles (Official Charts)	32
US Hot R&B/Hip-Hop Songs (Billboard)	56

=== Anthrax version ===
Chart (1991)	Peak position
New Zealand (Recorded Music NZ)	10
UK Singles (Official Charts)	14

== Remixes ==
In 2007, "Bring the Noise" was remixed by Italian house DJ Benny Benassi as well as Ferry Corsten. Benassi's remix slowed the track down, and cut off many of the lyrics. Benassi mixed two versions of the song. The Pump-kin version exemplifies a heavy melody, while the S-faction edit added more emphasis to the bassline. The S-faction version won a Grammy Award for best remixed recording at the 2008 Grammy Awards. The Pump-kin remix appeared on his album Rock 'n' Rave (2008). The song was also used for the EA Sports game, NBA Live 09. Ferry Corsten only mixed one version which was released around the same time as Benny Benassi's remixes, it was released on February 26, 2008 on iTunes.

In 2007, Gigi D'Agostino also released a track called "Quoting", a remix of the song. He made it in the style of Lento Violento, a style of Hardstyle focusing on slow and hard sound.

=== Benny Benassi ===
1. "Bring the Noise" (Pump-kin edit) – 3:37
2. "Bring the Noise" (S-faction edit) – 3:32
3. "Bring the Noise" (Pump-kin remix) – 6:38
4. "Bring the Noise" (S-faction remix) – 6:57
5. "Bring the Noise" (Pump-kin instrumental) – 6:38
6. "Bring the Noise" (S-faction instrumental) – 6:57

=== Ferry Corsten ===
1. "Bring the Noise" (radio edit)
2. "Bring the Noise" (extended mix)

=== Gigi D'Agostino (Lento Violento Man) ===
1. "Lento Violento Man" – Quoting

== Other versions ==
The alternative metal band Staind covered "Bring the Noise" with Limp Bizkit vocalist Fred Durst on the Take a Bite Outta Rhyme: A Rock Tribute to Rap 2000 compilation album. This version also appeared on the advance version of their 1999 album Dysfunction.

A remix of "Bring the Noise" titled "Bring the Noise 20XX", featuring Zakk Wylde, is a playable track in the video games Guitar Hero 5 and DJ Hero.

A traditional country version by Unholy Trio is included on the Bloodshot Records sampler "Down to the Promised Land".

An unofficial remix entitled "Bring DA Noise", (based on Led Zeppelin's – "Immigrant Song") was released for free download in 2005 by Irish radio presenter DJ Laz-e.

The 2012 video game Yakuza 5 features a track titled “Skankfunk - Vendor Pop”, which samples the ending of the Anthrax version of “Bring The Noise”, which plays during one of Tatsuo Shinada’s substories titled “Shinada’s Interview.”
