= Trust (rock band) =

French rock band

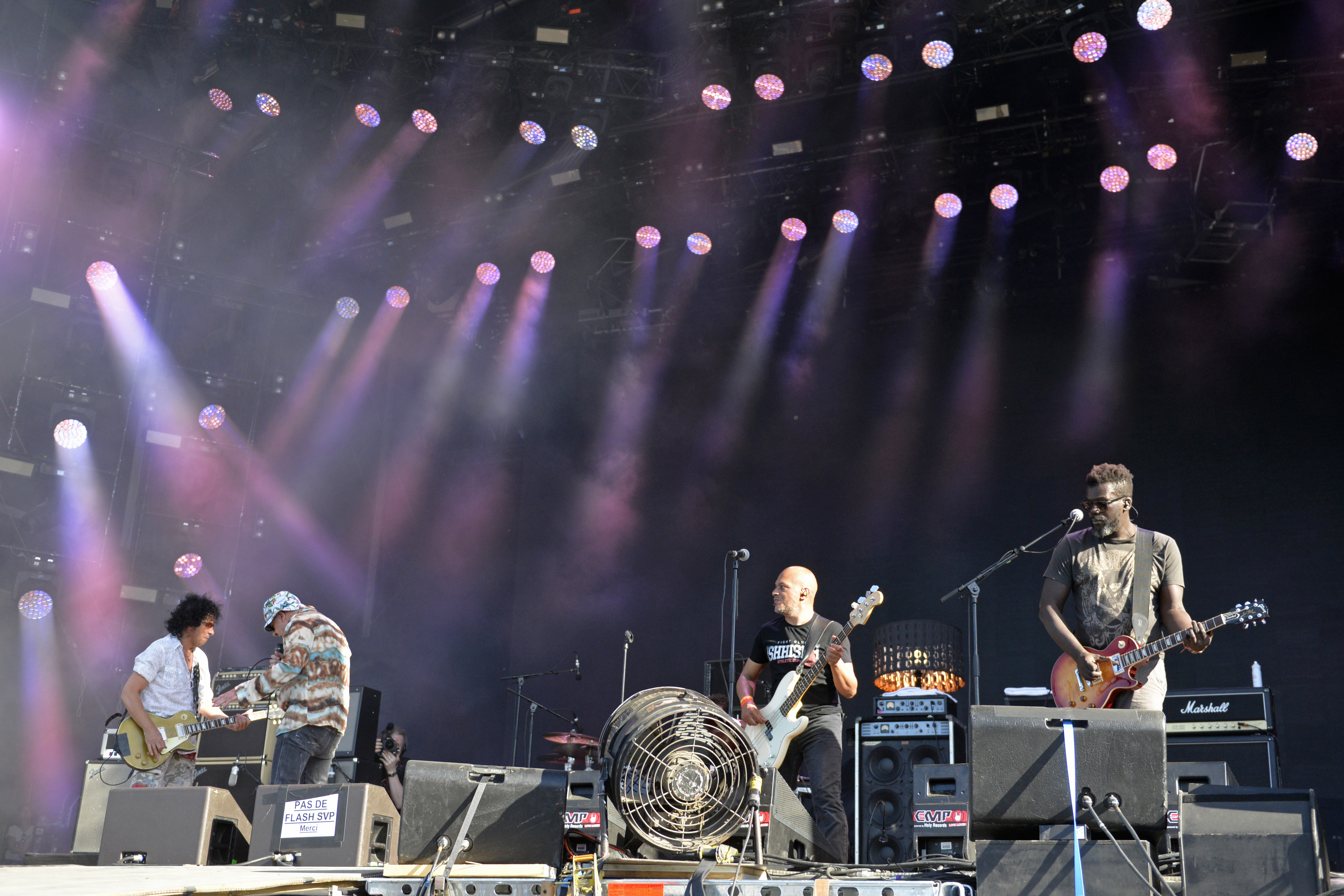
- Trust at Hellfest 2017

Background information
- Origin: Paris, France
- Genres: Hard rock; Latin rock; heavy metal
- Years active: 1977–1985, 1988, 1996–2000, 2006–2011, 2016–present
- Labels: Mercury, Verycords
- Members: Bernard "Bernie" Bonvoisin – vocals Norbert "Nono" Krief – lead guitar Ismalia "Isso" Diop – guitar Christian Dupuy – drums David Jacob – bass
- Past members: Farid Medjane – drums Yves "Vivi" Brusco – bass, guitar Deck -DJ; Fred Guillemet – bass Nicko McBrain – drums Clive Burr – drums

Trust are a French hard rock band, founded in 1977 and popular in Europe in the first half of the 1980s. They are best known for guitarist Norbert "Nono" Krief's prowess, for Bernard "Bernie" Bonvoisin's voice (reminiscent of AC/DC's Bon Scott) and for lyrics about social and political themes. The drummers Nicko McBrain and Clive Burr, each of whom is famous for having been a member of Iron Maiden, were at different times in the 1980s part of the Trust line-up. The band disbanded in 1985 and reformed in the 2000s for live shows and new recordings.

== History ==
Trust were founded in 1977 by Bernard "Bernie" Bonvoisin (vocals, lyricist), Norbert "Nono" Krief (guitar, composer), Raymond "Ray" Manna (bass) and Jean-Émile "Jeannot" Hanela (drums). The band released their first single "Prends Pas Ton Flingue" ("Don't Take Your Gun with You") in the same year. This record was re-released when the band made their first short-lived comeback in 1992.

Trust rose to fame in 1979 and 1980 with their music, which mixed hard rock influences, acerbic social and political commentary, anarchist undertones and a renegade attitude similar to that of MC5. Trust's success was also due to Krief's stature as a French guitar hero and Bonvoisin's sincere and mature lyrics, as well as his raw energy in live performances. Their 1980 hit song "Antisocial" from the album Répression criticized the frenetic, dehumanizing pace of modern life and work in large cities. "Le Mitard", from the same album, attacked what Trust claimed was an excessively repressive handling of juvenile delinquency, featuring texts from public enemy number one Jacques Mesrine and the song "Monsieur Comédie" criticizes Ayatollah Khomeini, who was in exile in France at the time, depicting him as a "torturer". To translate the songs' aggressive political messages Trust were helped on English lyrics for the Répression album by Jimmy Pursey of British punk band Sham 69. The English adaptation of the song "Antisocial", however, is pretty rough, and the lyrics are mild compared to the originals. While the first four lines in the French version translate to "You spend a lifetime working to pay for your own tombstone, You hide your face behind the newspaper, You walk like a robot in the subway corridors, Nobody cares about your presence, It's up to you to make the first step", the English version reads "You're a train ride to no importance, You're in love with hell existence, Money is all that you desire, Why don't you pack it in and retire".

Other major political songs includes "Darquier" (7" single, 1979) commenting on notorious Nazi Germany collaborator Louis Darquier de Pellepoix, "Les Brutes" (from the 1981 album Marche ou Crève) describes the savage acts done by the Warsaw Pact military forces at the Prague Spring in Czechoslovakia, "H & D" (from the 1979 album L'Élite), with "H & D" standing for "Hôpital & Débiles" ("Asylum & Psychos"), accuses the Soviet Union and its secret services (KGB) of suppressing dissent by sending political opponents to psychiatric hospitals under fake diagnoses.

The style of singer Bernie Bonvoisin was compared to that of Bon Scott from AC/DC, with whom Trust had a friendly relationship. "Ride On" by AC/DC was covered on Trust's 1979 debut album. In fact, their debut single "Prends pas ton flingue", from 1977, had a French adaption of AC/DC's "Love at First Feel" ("Paris by Night") as its B-side. The Répression dans l'Hexagone (Repression in the Hexagon) live album, recorded in 1980, featured the covers of the AC/DC songs "Problem Child" and "Live Wire". The album was released as Trust Live in 1992, twelve years after its recording by Sony Music France coinciding with AC/DC's Live album release in France. However, the band members denied using such a marketing strategy, claiming the masters they thought were lost had been found the same year by coincidence.

By 1983, after releasing three successful albums in a row and with worldwide touring, opening for Iron Maiden and others, the band came under increasing criticism for its less "incisive" sound, the use of synthesizers and the frequent changes of drummers — e.g. Nicko McBrain quit the band after Savage, the English version of Marche ou Crève (march or die) to join Iron Maiden). The former Iron Maiden drummer Clive Burr went the opposite way, before himself quitting after recording the 1983 album Trust IV (Idéal). After disappointing record sales of the latest album Rock'n'Roll, Trust disbanded in 1985, with Bonvoisin concentrating on his subsequent solo career and Krief joining the 'French Elvis' Johnny Hallyday as a lead guitarist both in the studio and live from 1985 to 1993.

Meanwhile, the band's most successful song "Antisocial" was covered (in English) in 1988 by Anthrax on their State of Euphoria album and became one of their most popular songs and videos. A year later Anthrax also recorded the French version of the song, which is featured on their 1989 EP Penikufesin. A live version of the 12" single for Anthrax's song "Make Me Laugh" features Bernie Bonvoisin on vocals together with Anthrax singer Joey Belladonna. Bolstered by a sudden worldwide interest in the band, Trust was added to the 1988 Monsters of Rock Festival in Paris. At this occasion the live album Paris by Night was recorded and released internationally by Megaforce Records, the home label of both Metallica and Anthrax. The band kept on touring in 1989 and released a stop-gap covers and outtakes album, titled En attendant (literally "while waiting"), before disbanding yet again.

Trust reunited around Krief and Bonvoisin with a new studio album Europe et haines in 1996 (literally translating to "europe and hate", while being pronounced "european" in French), signing a contract with Warner. After some touring and another live-album, Bonvoisin and Krief split over differences concerning the recording of the follow-up studio album Ni Dieu, ni maitre (Neither God nor Master), which was independently released by Krief in 2000 before being pulled from the shelves after an intervention by Bonvoisin.

In early July 2006, Trust's extended classic line-up, later upgraded by a DJ, reformed to perform a gig at the Festival des Terres Neuvas, which was later released as a live album. After a jubilee gig in 2007, 30 years after their first appearance on stage at the Paris Olympia venue, an album of all-new material, 13 à table (Thirteen at the Table) was recorded and released in September 2008.

In 2012, Bonvoisin stated that there would be no Trust reunification and also no remastered albums. However, later in the year the band was added to the Sonisphere France line-up, but cancelled soon afterward. Bonvoisin started touring in 2013 with a line-up excluding Krief under the moniker "Kollektif AK47" before disbanding again.

Since 2016 and on the occasion of their upcoming 40th anniversary 2017, Trust have been touring and recording regularly again with a, for once, stable line-up, releasing three albums of new material (all of them recorded under "live" conditions and mixed by Mike Fraser) and a box set of their first three albums, re-recorded with updated lyrics.

== Discography ==
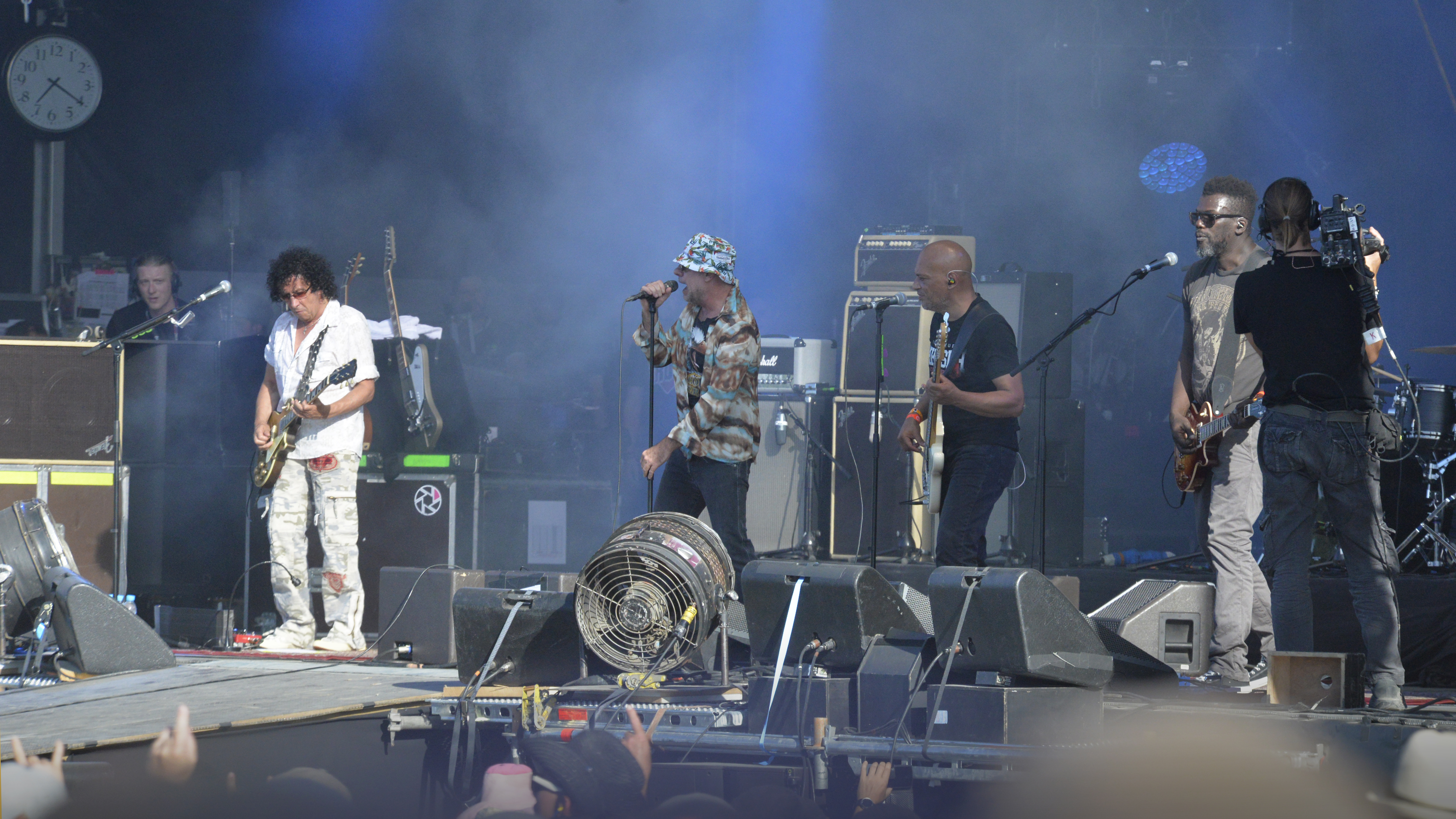
Trust at Hellfest 2017

=== Singles ===
- 1977 "Prends Pas Ton Flingue" / "Paris By Night" [SP] France

=== Albums ===
- 1979 Trust I (L'Élite) France, United Kingdom, United States, Netherlands, Japan CBS 83732
- 1980 Répression France, Germany PFC 90610 CBS
- 1980 Repression (English version of Répression) United Kingdom, United States, Netherlands, Japan, Canada S CBS 84958
- 1981 Marche Ou Crève France, Germany, Italy EPIC EPC 85238 (with Nicko McBrain on drums)
- 1982 Savage (English version of Marche Ou Crève) United Kingdom, United States, Spain, Netherlands, Portugal, Japan (with Nicko McBrain on drums)
- 1983 Trust IV (Idéal) France, Germany EPC 25666 (with Clive Burr on drums)
- 1984 Man's Trap (English version of Trust IV) United Kingdom, United States, Japan, Netherlands (with Farid Medjane on drums)
- 1984 Rock'n'Roll France, Canada
- 1988 En attendant... [EP] France, United Kingdom, United States
- 1992 Prends pas ton flingue [EP] France
- 1993 The Back Sides [EP] France EPC 473916-2
- 1996 Europe et Haines France Wea 0630-16712-2
- 2000 Ni Dieu Ni Maître France XIIIBIS Records 526 291 PM 125
- 2008 13 à table France Universal Mercury 5311096
- 2018 Dans Le Même Sang
- 2019 Fils de lutte
- 2020 ReCiDiv – Rerecordings of the first three albums with the current line-up under live conditions. Released separately or as a boxset.
- 2022 Propaganda

=== Live albums ===
- 1988 Live: Paris By Night (recorded at Bercy Sep 24/25,1988 on the Monsters of Rock tour with Iron Maiden, Anthrax, and Helloween) France, United States
- 1992 Répression dans l'Hexagone (Live) (Répression dans l'Hexagone 1980 tour) France
- 1997 A Live Tour 97 (Insurrection dans l'Hexagone tour) France
- 2000 Still A-live (German edition of A Live Tour 97, contains a bonus 6-track EP) Germany
- 2006 Soulagez-vous dans les urnes! (2006 tour, contains 3 new studio tracks) France
- 2009 A L'Olympia (2008 tour, Rockpalast 1982 gig added in the limited CD + DVD edition)France
- 2017 Hellfest 2017: Au nom de la rage tour (recorded during the Hellfest) France

=== Compilation albums ===
- 1981 Heavy Metal Soundtrack – Includes a version of "Prefabricated".
- 1997 Anti Best of France, Germany
- 2001 Les Indispensables De Trust (Original versions) France
- 2002 Les Plus Belles Chansons (Canadian edition of "Les Indispensables", original versions) Canada
- 2004 Le Meilleur Des Années CBS (Original versions) France

=== Boxed sets ===
- 1997 Trust I / Repression France, United States
- 2008 "Les Annees CBS", EU (11CD Boxset)

=== Tribute ===
- 2001 Tribute to Trust [VA] France
