= Mark Dodson (music producer) =

American record producer

- Born: 10 September 1953 (age 72); London, England
- Genres: Heavy metal; hard rock; thrash metal; glam metal; alternative metal; groove metal; funk metal
- Occupations: Record producer; audio engineer
- Years active: 1977–present

Mark Dodson (born 10 September 1953) is a British record producer and audio engineer, who mostly works with artists in the heavy metal genre. He is best known for producing albums by Anthrax, Judas Priest and Suicidal Tendencies.

== Biography ==
Dodson's musical career began in the late 1970s, engineering recordings by Advertising, Judas Priest, Joan Jett and mixing an album by Jonathan Richman's proto punk garage band, The Modern Lovers. He also worked for a number of heavy metal artists, such as Metal Church, Ozzy Osbourne, Prong, Glenn Tipton, U.D.O. and Ugly Kid Joe.

In late 1980s and early 1990s, Dodson worked with Anthrax to produce two of their albums State of Euphoria (1988) and Persistence of Time (1990) as well as the Europe-only EP Penikufesin (1989) and the compilation album Attack of the Killer B's (1991). Around 1992, Anthrax and Dodson discontinued their collaboration and the band had Dave Jerden produce their next album, Sound of White Noise (1993).

Dodson also produced the Suicidal Tendencies albums How Will I Laugh Tomorrow (1988), Controlled by Hatred/Feel Like Shit...Déjà Vu (1989) and Lights...Camera...Revolution! (1990) as well as the compilation album Still Cyco After All These Years (1993). The band parted ways with him in 1991 while they decided to move in a different musical direction for their next album, The Art of Rebellion (1992). Dodson also worked with the Infectious Grooves, a project featuring Suicidal Tendencies members, to produce their first two albums, The Plague That Makes Your Booty Move (1991) and Sarsippius' Ark (1993). Dodson also produced the Electric Love Hogs only release in 1992. Tommy Lee Co-produced two tracks on this album with Dodson. Dodson also produced Scottish band The Almighty's 1993 album Powertrippin'.

== Works ==
Production/Engineering/Mixing/Arranging

- Roger Daltrey - Ride a Rock Horse (1975)
- Steve Gibbons - Caught in the Act (1977)
- Judas Priest - Sin After Sin (1977)
- Intergalactic Touring Band - Intergalactic Touring Band (1977)
- The Rubinoos - The Rubinoos (1977)
- Advertising - Jingles (1978)
- The Modern Lovers - Live (1978)
- Tyla Gang - Moonproof (1978)
- The Rubinoos - Back to the Drawing Board (1979)
- Tyla Gang - Just Popped Out (1980)
- Joan Jett - Bad Reputation (1981)
- Bow Wow Wow - I Want Candy (1982)
- Judas Priest - Defenders of the Faith (1984)
- John Parr - John Parr (1984)
- Ángeles del Infierno - Pacto con el Diablo (1984)
- Loverboy - Lovin' Every Minute of It (1985)
- Rough Cutt - Rough Cutt (1985)
- Metal Church - The Dark (1986)
- U.D.O. - Animal House (1987)
- Deathwish - At the Edge of Damnation (1987)
- Ángeles del Infierno - Lo Mejor de Los Angeles del Infierno (1987)
- Some Kind of Wonderful Original Soundtrack (1987)
- Suicidal Tendencies - How Will I Laugh Tomorrow When I Can't Even Smile Today (1988)
- U.D.O. - Mean Machine (1988)
- Anthrax - State of Euphoria (1988)
- Loverboy - Big Ones (1989)
- Lord Tracy - Deaf Gods of Babylon (1989)
- Accept - Eat the Heat (1989)
- Prong - Beg to Differ (1990)
- Suicidal Tendencies - Lights...Camera...Revolution! (1990)
- Anthrax - Persistence of Time (1990)
- Stéphane Grappelli - Something Old Something New (1990)
- Anthrax - Attack of the Killer B's (1991)
- Anthrax - N.F.V.: Oidivnikufesin (1991)
- Prong - Prove You Wrong (1991)
- Shooting Gallery - Shooting Gallery (1991)
- Metal Church - The Human Factor (1991)
- Infectious Grooves - The Plague That Makes Your Booty Move (1991)
- Ugly Kid Joe - America's Least Wanted (1992)
- Electric Love Hogs - Electric Love Hogs (1992)
- The Iron City Houserockers - Pumping Iron & Sweating Steel: The Best of the Iron City Houserockers (1992)
- Prong - Whose Fist Is This Anyway? (1992)
- Bakers Pink - Bakers Pink (1993)
- The Wildhearts - Earth vs the Wildhearts (1993)
- Now That's What I Call Music! 24 [UK] (1993)
- The Almighty - Powertrippin' (1993)
- Infectious Grooves - Sarsippius' Ark (1993)
- Suicidal Tendencies - Still Cyco After All These Years (1993)
- Joan Jett / Joan Jett & the Blackhearts - Flashback (1994)
- The Rubinoos - Garage Sale (1994)
- Shootyz Groove - Jammin' in Vicious Environments (1994)
- Loverboy - Loverboy Classics: Their Greatest Hits (1994)
- The Nixons - Foma (1995)
- The Nixons - Happy Song (1995)
- The Wildhearts - P.H.U.Q. (1995)
- Hi-Octane Hard-Driving Hits for the Roadious (1996)
- Varga - Oxygen (1996)
- Bow Wow Wow - The Best of Bow Wow Wow [RCA] (1996)
- Glenn Tipton - Baptizm of Fire (1997)
- Before X (1997)
- Joan Jett / Joan Jett & the Blackhearts - Fit to Be Tied: Great Hits by Joan Jett and the Blackhearts (1997)
- Roger Daltrey - Martyrs & Madmen: The Best of Roger Daltrey (1997)
- Suicidal Tendencies - Prime Cuts (1997)
- The Wildhearts - The Best of the Wildhearts (1997)
- New Model Army - Strange Brotherhood (1998)
- Ugly Kid Joe - The Very Best of Ugly Kid Joe: As Ugly as It Gets (1998)
- U.D.O. - Best of U.D.O. (1999)
- Anthrax - Return of the Killer A's: The Best of Anthrax (1999)
- Suicidal Tendencies - FNG (2000)
- Laguna Tunes (2000)
- Plácido Domingo - Songs of Love (2000)
- Public Enemy - 20th Century Masters - The Millennium Collection: The Best of Public Enemy (2001)
- Cocobat - Ghost Tree Giant (2001)
- Anthrax - Madhouse: The Very Best of Anthrax (2001)
- Matchbox Twenty - More Than You Think You Are (2002)
- Ugly Kid Joe - The Collection (2002)
- Anthrax - Universal Masters Collection (2002)
- Sean Tyla - Just Popped Out/Redneck in Babylon (2003)
- Rock vs. Rap (2004)
- Anthrax - Anthrology: No Hit Wonders (1985-1991) (2005)
- Anthrax - Anthrology: No Hit Wonders 1985-1991 [DVD] (2005)
- Ozzy Osbourne - Prince of Darkness (2005)
- Glenn Tipton - Edge of the World (2006)
- Loverboy - Keep It Up/Lovin' Every Minute of It (2006)
- We Are the '80s (2006)
- The Rubinoos - Everything You Always Wanted to Know About (2007)
- OutReach - False Statements From A Pretty Mouth (2007)
- Heavy Metal [Rhino Box Set] (2007)
- U.D.O. - Metallized: The Best of U.D.O. (2007)
- Metal Church - Rhino Hi-Five: Metal Church (2007)
- Judas Priest - Collections (2008)
- Judas Priest - Original Album Classics (2008)
- Loverboy - Steel Box Collection - Greatest Hits (2008)
- Joan Jett / Joan Jett & the Blackhearts - Greatest Hits [Blackheart] (2010)
- Suicidal Tendencies - Playlist: The Very Best of Suicidal Tendencies (2010)
- Judas Priest - Hell Bent for Leather/Defenders of the Faith (2012)
- Anthrax - Icon (2012)
- Prong - Playlist: The Very Best of Prong (2012)
- Steve Gibbons / Steve Gibbons Band - Street Parade/Saints & Sinners (2012)
- Judas Priest - The Complete Albums Collection (2012)
- Joan Jett / Joan Jett & the Blackhearts - Greatest Hits [Liberator] (2013)
- Joan Jett / Joan Jett & the Blackhearts - Greatest Hits [Sony] (2014)
- Joan Jett - Bad Reputation [Music From the Original Motion Picture] (2018)
