= Persistence of Time =

Studio album by Anthrax
- Released: August 21, 1990
- Recorded: December 1989 – February 1990
- Studios: A&M and Conway (Hollywood, California); Soundtrack (New York City)
- Genre: Thrash metal
- Length: 58:40
- Labels: Megaforce; Island
- Producers: Anthrax; Mark Dodson

Anthrax chronology
| Penikufesin (1989) | Persistence of Time (1990) | Attack of the Killer B's (1991) |

Anthrax studio chronology
| State of Euphoria (1988) | Persistence of Time (1990) | Sound of White Noise (1993) |

Singles from Persistence of Time
- 1. "Got the Time" Released: 1990; 2. "In My World" Released: 1990; 3. "Belly of the Beast" Released: 1990

Persistence of Time is the fifth studio album by the American thrash metal band Anthrax. It was released on August 21, 1990, through Megaforce Worldwide/Island Records and was nominated in 1991 for a Grammy Award in the Best Metal Performance category.

The album included the singles, "Got the Time" (a Joe Jackson cover) and "In My World" (which was performed by the band on the Married... with Children episode, "My Dinner with Anthrax"). Persistence of Time was the last full Anthrax album to feature vocalist Joey Belladonna until 2011's Worship Music.

== Album information ==
Anthrax returned to the studio in the fall of 1989 with Mark Dodson (who produced the previous album, State of Euphoria) to start work on their fifth album. Recording of the album was difficult, with a large structure fire causing the band to lose more than $100,000 worth of gear and their rehearsal studio in Yonkers, New York on January 24, 1990. Following this disaster, the band moved to a different studio in late February of that year to finish work on the album.

The album's tone is decidedly more contemplative and mature than the bulk of Anthrax's previous work. Abandoning the humor and comic book references which were common on their previous albums, the lyrical focus of Persistence of Time is the need for tolerance and peace. Reaction to Persistence of Time was mixed, with critics and fans alternately panning and praising this darker sound. The band also introduced a progressive side of the music which had not been present in their earlier work, while also placing a reduced emphasis on typical thrash metal elements such as fast tempo and aggression.

This is the last full studio album to feature Joey Belladonna on vocals before John Bush took over vocal duties. Belladonna appeared on several songs on the 1991 EP Attack of the Killer B's before splitting acrimoniously from the band in 1992. He returned to the band in June 2010 to record the album Worship Music, which was released in 2011.

The introduction to the album's sixth track "Intro to Reality" featured dialogue from an episode of The Twilight Zone called "Deaths-Head Revisited". "Keep It in the Family", "In My World", and "Belly of the Beast" were later re-recorded with the John Bush/Rob Caggiano line-up for the album The Greater of Two Evils.

== Reception ==
Professional ratings
Review scores
| Source | Rating |
|---|---|
| AllMusic | 4/5 stars |
| The Collector's Guide to Heavy Metal | 7/10 |
| The Encyclopedia of Popular Music | 4/5 stars |
| Kerrang! | 4/5 stars |
| (The New) Rolling Stone Album Guide | 3.5/5 stars |
| Select | 4/5 medals |
| Sputnikmusic | 4/5 |

Persistence of Time's highest position on the Billboard 200 chart was No. 24. It was certified gold by the RIAA on January 17, 1991.

Steve Huey of AllMusic gave the album a favorable review, saying that it "rivals Among the Living as Anthrax's best album". "The more cartoonish side of the band" is substituted by a "dark, uncompromising examination of society's dirty underbelly", which makes Persistence of Time "their most lyrically consistent album". Kim Neely of the American magazine Rolling Stone underlines the social tone of the lyrics and describes Persistence of Time as "a foray into the dreary, gray bowels of urban hell", praising singer Joey Belladonna for "railing against every societal ill known to city-bred man". He concludes saying that the album "ain't the most uplifting thing to listen to, but it's real." A similar concept was explained by a review by The New York Times of November 18, 1990, which said that "the music carries the exhilaration of a desperate struggle." Canadian journalist Martin Popoff praised the "admirable Prong/Pantera/Metallica '90s minimalism at work here", but found "the overall effect just so dense and relentless that it just wears you out by hangover's end." Loudwire ranked the album #25 on their list "Top 90 Hard Rock + Metal Albums of the 90's".

== Track listing ==
All tracks are written by Anthrax except "Got the Time" by Joe Jackson.

Side one
| No. | Title | Length |
|---|---|---|
| 1. | "Time" | 6:55 |
| 2. | "Blood" | 7:13 |
| 3. | "Keep It in the Family" | 7:08 |
| 4. | "In My World" | 6:25 |
| 5. | "Gridlock" | 5:17 |

Side two
| No. | Title | Length |
|---|---|---|
| 6. | "Intro to Reality" (instrumental) | 3:23 |
| 7. | "Belly of the Beast" | 4:47 |
| 8. | "Got the Time" (Joe Jackson cover) | 2:44 |
| 9. | "H8 Red" | 5:04 |
| 10. | "One Man Stands" | 5:38 |
| 11. | "Discharge" | 4:12 |
| Total length: | | 58:40 |

Japanese edition bonus track
| No. | Title | Writer(s) | Length |
|---|---|---|---|
| 11. | "Protest and Survive" (Discharge cover) | Garry Maloney, Tony "Bones" Roberts, Roy "Rainy" Wainwright, Kelvin "Cal" Morris | 2:22 |
| 12. | "Discharge" | | 4:12 |
| 13. | "'Backwards Message Quiz'" (Spoken track by Charlie Benante played in reverse; set up a quiz mentioned in the Japanese-language booklet. Removed from 2007 and all future reprints of the Japanese CD.) | | 0:13 |
| Total length: | | | 61:15 |

== Personnel ==
Anthrax

- Joey Belladonna – lead vocals
- Dan Spitz – lead guitar, backing vocals, rhythm guitar ("Got The Time")
- Scott Ian – rhythm guitar, backing vocals, lead guitar ("Intro To Reality" (intro harmony), "Got The Time")
- Frank Bello – bass, backing vocals
- Charlie Benante – drums, lead guitar ("Intro to Reality" (intro harmony) )

Production

- Anthrax – producer, liner notes
- Mark Dodson – producer, basic tracks engineer
- Steve Thompson, Michael Barbiero – mixing at Electric Lady Studios, New York
- Greg Goldman, Brian Schueble, Marnie Bryant, Ed Korengo – assistant engineers
- Bob Ludwig – mastering at Masterdisk, New York
- Jon and Marsha Zazula – executive producers
- Don Brautigam – artwork
- Waring Abbott – photography

== Charts ==
| Chart (1990–91) | Peak position |
|---|---|
| Australian Albums (ARIA) | 30 |
| Dutch Albums (Album Top 100) | 45 |
| Finnish Albums (The Official Finnish Charts) | 10 |
| German Albums (Offizielle Top 100) | 35 |
| Japanese Albums (Oricon) | 42 |
| New Zealand Albums (RMNZ) | 4 |
| Norwegian Albums (VG-lista) | 15 |
| Swedish Albums (Sverigetopplistan) | 46 |
| UK Albums (Official Charts) | 13 |
| US Billboard 200 | 24 |

| Chart (2020) | Peak position |
|---|---|
| Scottish Albums (Official Charts) | 86 |
| UK Independent Albums (Official Charts) | 27 |

== Certifications ==
| Region | Certification | Certified units/sales |
|---|---|---|
| United States (RIAA) | Gold | 500,000^{^} |
^{^} Shipments figures based on certification alone.
