= Sound of White Noise =

Studio album by Anthrax
- Released: May 25, 1993
- Studios: Henson (Hollywood); Cherokee (Hollywood); Eldorado (Hollywood)
- Genres: Alternative metal; heavy metal; groove metal; grunge
- Length: 56:56
- Label: Elektra
- Producers: Dave Jerden; Anthrax

Anthrax chronology
Attack of the Killer B's (1991)	Sound of White Noise (1993)	Live: The Island Years (1994)

Anthrax studio chronology
Persistence of Time (1990)	Sound of White Noise (1993)	Stomp 442 (1995)

Singles from Sound of White Noise
- 1. "Only" Released: June 24, 1993; 2. "Room for One More" Released: 1993; 3. "Black Lodge" Released: August 19, 1993; 4. "Hy Pro Glo" Released: 1994

Sound of White Noise is the sixth studio album by American heavy metal band Anthrax, released on May 25, 1993, by Elektra Records. It was the band's first album to feature vocalist John Bush, who replaced longtime frontman Joey Belladonna in 1992, and the last studio album with longtime lead guitarist Dan Spitz. Sound of White Noise saw Anthrax move away from their previous thrash metal sound in favor of a slower style.

== Production and musical style ==
The album was produced by the band and Dave Jerden. Jerden was known for producing the likes of Alice in Chains and Jane's Addiction and also previously produced Symbol of Salvation for John Bush's previous band, Armored Saint.

With the departure of lead vocalist Joey Belladonna, the album marked a significant revision in the band's sound. Their earlier fast-paced thrash metal style was de-emphasized, with a new focus on relatively slower tempos and hints of alternative rock, grunge, and groove metal.

Sound of White Noise includes the singles "Only", "Room for One More", "Black Lodge" and "Hy Pro Glo". During the recording of the album, the band also recorded the songs "Poison My Eyes" and a cover of the Smiths song "London" (both would be featured on film soundtracks for Last Action Hero and Airheads, respectively).

== Reception ==
Professional ratings
Review scores
Source	Rating
AllMusic	3/5 stars
Collector's Guide to Heavy Metal	10/10
Encyclopedia of Popular Music	4/5 stars
The New Rolling Stone Album Guide	3/5 stars
Rolling Stone	4/5 stars

Dave Connolly reviewed the album on behalf of AllMusic and called it "surprisingly melodic" but "predictably pummeling" and the music "relentless". He commends the overall quality of the songs on the album before settling on "Only" as the best overall, but calls out several other tracks for praise as well. Rock journalist Martin Popoff praised the performance of new singer John Bush and the production by Dave Jerden and defined the album's music "top-flight, state-of-the-art metal, fortified by the band's usual societal concerns, here elevated to eloquent outrage at man's crumbling morality." Spin critic John Wiederhorn described the album as "a good typical heavy-metal record." Nevertheless, he also noted that the album "doesn't wander beyond the sound of its dark, moody intros and tuneful, galloping rhythms." Tom Sinclair of Rolling Stone described the album as "a powerful comeback from a group that never went away."

Among the album's songs, "Only" has received particular attention; Metallica frontman James Hetfield is said to have referred to "Only" as a "perfect song".

== Commercial performance ==
The album debuted at No. 7 on the Billboard 200 charts, selling 62,000 copies in its first week. It is Anthrax's highest ever chart position. It sold 40,000 more copies in its second week. Sound of White Noise was certified gold by the RIAA on July 13, 1993.

As of 2002, the album had sold 511,284 copies in the US.

The singles "Only" and "Black Lodge" charted at No. 26 and No. 38, respectively, on Billboard's Album Rock Tracks chart. In the UK, "Only" and "Black Lodge" charted at No. 36 and No. 53, respectively.

== Track listing ==
All music and lyrics by Charlie Benante, Scott Ian and John Bush, except where noted; all melody lines by Bush, Frank Bello, and Ian; all songs arranged by Anthrax (Ian, Benante, Bello, Bush, and Dan Spitz).

No.	Title	Music	Length
1.	"Potters Field"		5:00
2.	"Only"		4:56
3.	"Room for One More"		4:54
4.	"Packaged Rebellion"		6:18
5.	"Hy Pro Glo"		4:30
6.	"Invisible"	Benante, Ian, Bush, Bello	6:09
7.	"1000 Points of Hate"		5:00
8.	"Black Lodge"	Benante, Ian, Bush, Angelo Badalamenti	5:24
9.	"C_{11} H_{17} N_{2} O_{2} S Na" (also known as "Sodium Pentathol")		4:24
10.	"Burst"	Benante, Ian, Bush, Bello	3:35
11.	"This Is Not an Exit"		6:49
Total length:			56:56

Bonus tracks (2001 remaster)
No.	Title	Writer(s)	Length
12.	"Auf Wiedersehen" (Cheap Trick cover)	Rick Nielsen, Tom Petersson	3:33
13.	"Cowboy Song" (Thin Lizzy cover)	Phil Lynott, Brian Downey	5:06
14.	"London" (The Smiths cover)	Morrissey, Johnny Marr	2:54
15.	"Black Lodge" ((Strings Mix))	Benante, Ian, Bush, Badalamenti	5:21
Total length:			73:50

Bonus CD (Japanese edition)
No.	Title	Writer(s)	Length
1.	"Noisegate"	Anthrax	4:25
2.	"Cowboy Song" (Thin Lizzy cover)	Phil Lynott, Brian Downey	5:06
3.	"Auf Wiedersehen" (Cheap Trick cover)	Rick Nielsen, Tom Petersson	3:33
4.	"Looking Down the Barrel of a Gun" (Beastie Boys cover)	Michael Diamond, Adam Horovitz, John King, Adam Yauch, Matt Dike, Mike Simpson	3:09
Total length:			73:09

== Personnel ==
All personnel credits for Sound of White Noise are adapted from the album's liner notes.

Anthrax

- Scott Ian – rhythm guitar, 6-string bass, backing vocals; sound effects; all guitars ("Black Lodge"); lead guitar ("Burst")
- Charlie Benante – drums; sound effects; second harmony lead guitar ("Black Lodge"); artwork and photo concept
- Dan Spitz – lead guitar (except "Black Lodge" and "Burst"); rhythm guitar ("Burst")
- Frank Bello – 4, 6, and 12-string bass guitars, backing vocals
- John Bush – lead vocals

Additional musicians

- Vincent Bell – tremolo guitar parts and additional guitar ("Black Lodge")
- Angelo Badalamenti – synthesizers, orchestration and arrangement of synthesizers, and additional guitars ("Black Lodge")
- Kenny Landrum – synthesizers ("Black Lodge")
- Terminator X – scratching ("1000 Points of Hate")

Production

- Dave Jerden – production, mixing
- Anthrax – production
- Bryan Carlstrom – engineering
- Ed Korengo – assistant engineer
- Mike Baumgartner – assistant engineer
- Annette Cisneros – assistant engineer
- Scott Ralston – assistant engineer
- Jennifer Monnar – assistant mixing engineer
- Mike Tempesta – key man
- Eddy Schreyer – mastering

Creative

- Paul Elledge – artwork and photo concepts
- Mark Fox – icons
- Black Dog – icons
- Robin Lynch – art dircetion
- Reiner Design Consultants, Inc. – design

== Charts ==
Chart (1993)	Peak position
Australian Albums (ARIA)	30
Canadian Albums (The Record)	10
Dutch Albums (Album Top 100)	52
Finnish Albums (The Official Finnish Charts)	9
German Albums (Offizielle Top 100)	35
Japanese Albums (Oricon)	12
New Zealand Albums (RMNZ)	46
Swedish Albums (Sverigetopplistan)	21
Swiss Albums (Schweizer Hitparade)	40
UK Albums (Official Charts)	14
US Billboard 200	7

== Certifications ==
Region	Certification	Certified units/sales
Canada (Music Canada)	Gold	50,000^{^}
United States (RIAA)	Gold	500,000^
^{^} Shipments figures based on certification alone.
