= Bernie Bonvoisin =

French hard rock singer and director

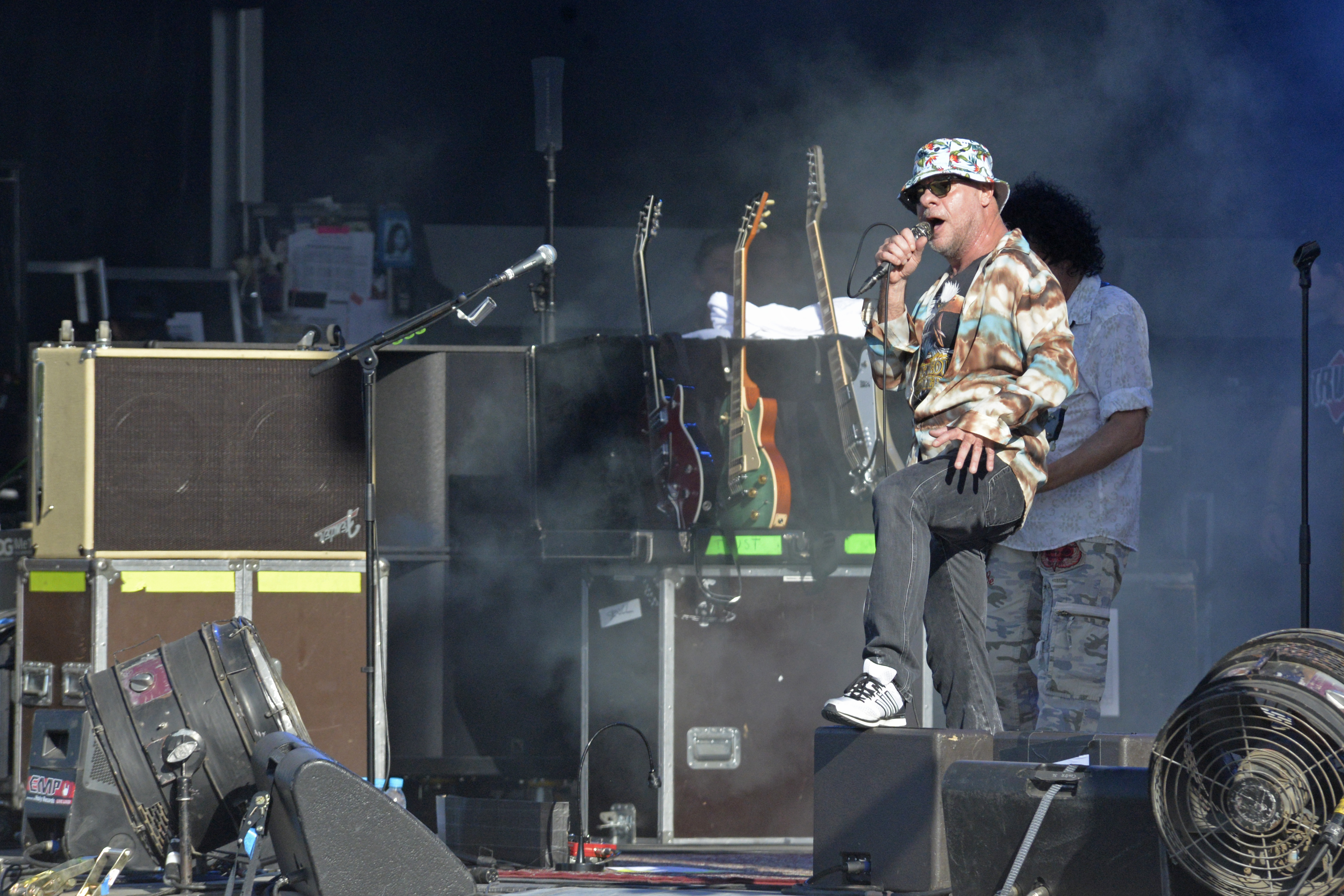
Bernie Bonvoisin

Bernard Bonvoisin (French: [bɛʁnaʁ bɔ̃vwazɛ̃]; born 9 July 1956, Nanterre), known as Bernie Bonvoisin, is a French hard rock singer and film director. He is best known for having been the singer of Trust.

He was one of the best friends of Bon Scott, the singer of AC/DC, and together they recorded the song "Ride On" which was one of the last songs by Bon Scott.
