= Norbert Krief =

French guitarist (born 1956)

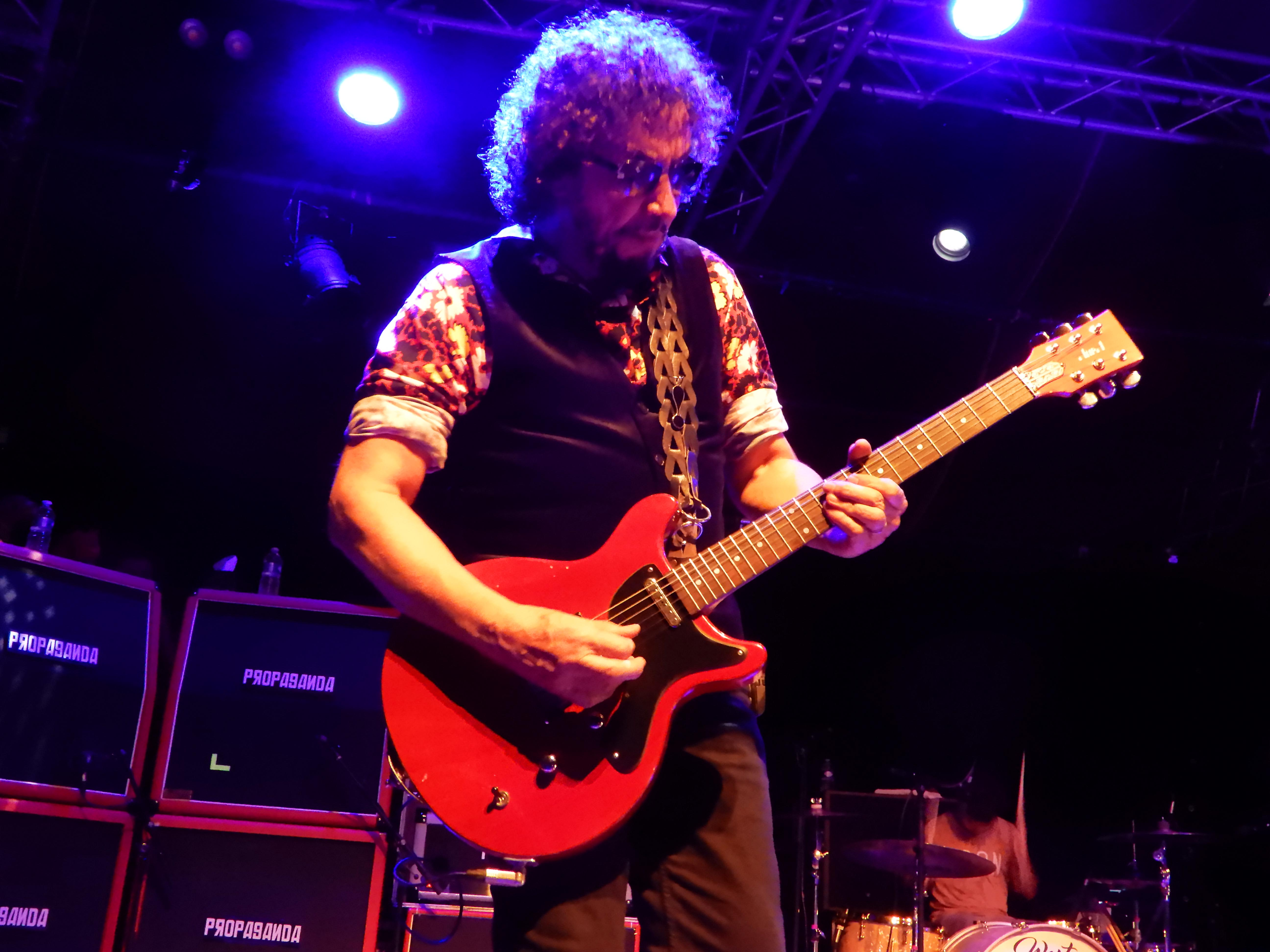
- Norbert Krief in 2022

Background information
- Also known as: Nono Krief
- Born: Norbert Albert Krief; 17 July 1956 (age 69); Tunis, Kingdom of Tunisia
- Origin: Paris, France
- Genres: Rock; blues; hard rock; pop rock; heavy metal
- Instrument: Electric guitar
- Website: nkrief.com

Norbert Albert Krief (French: [nɔʁbɛʁ albɛʁ kʁijɛf]; born 17 July 1956), often known as Nono, is a French rock guitarist.

Krief was the guitarist of hard rock bands such like Shakin' Street and Trust. He later worked as lead guitarist for Johnny Hallyday and Fabienne Shine among a variety of other collaborations.
