= Aftermath =

Aftermath may refer to:

== Companies ==
- Aftermath (comics), an imprint of Devil's Due Publishing
- Aftermath Entertainment, an American record label founded by Dr. Dre
- Aftermath Media, an American multimedia company
- Aftermath Services, an American crime-scene cleanup company
- Aftermath (website), a video game website and blog founded in 2023

== Film and television ==
=== Films ===
- Aftermath (1914 film), an American lost silent film
- Aftermath (1927 film), a German silent film
- Aftermath (1990 film) or Crash: The Mystery of Flight 1501, an American television film
- Aftermath (1994 film), a Spanish short horror film by Nacho Cerdà
- Aftermath (2001 film), a television movie starring Meredith Baxter
- Aftermath (2002 film), starring Sean Young
- Aftermath (2004 film), a Danish film
- Aftermath (2012 film), a Polish thriller and drama
- Aftermath (2013 film), starring Anthony Michael Hall
- Aftermath (2014 film), an apocalyptic thriller by Peter Engert
- Aftermath (2017 film), starring Arnold Schwarzenegger
- Aftermath (2021 film), starring Ashley Greene
- Aftermath (2024 American film), an action film
- Aftermath (2024 Hungarian film), starring Eric Roberts and Sally Kirkland
- Aftermath: Population Zero, a 2008 Canadian television documentary film
- Aftermath: The Remnants of War, a 2001 Canadian documentary
- Aftermath: A Test of Love, a 1991 television movie about the Hi-Fi murders
- The Aftermath (1914 film), a silent film starring Harry von Meter
- The Aftermath (1982 film), a science fiction film starring Sid Haig
- The Aftermath (2019 film), starring Keira Knightley

=== Television ===
==== Series ====
- Aftermath (2010 TV series), a Canadian documentary series
- Aftermath (South Korean TV series), a South Korean web series
- Aftermath (2016 TV series), a Canadian drama series
- Aftermath with William Shatner, a 2010–2011 American series
- Tsunami: The Aftermath, a 2006 American miniseries

==== Episodes ====
- "Aftermath" (Blake's 7)
- "Aftermath" (Daredevil)
- "Aftermath" (DCI Banks)
- "Aftermath" (The Good Doctor)
- "Aftermath" (McLeod's Daughters)
- "Aftermath" (Scream)
- "Aftermath" (Star Wars: The Bad Batch)
- "Aftermath" (Stargate Universe)
- "Aftermath" (Superstore)
- "The Aftermath" (30 Rock)
- "The Aftermath" (Dynasty 1985)
- "The Aftermath" (Dynasty 1987)
- "The Aftermath" (Dynasty 2021)
- "The Aftermath" (The Jacksons: A Family Dynasty)
- "The Aftermath" (The Legend of Korra)
- "The Aftermath" (The O.C.)
- "The Aftermath" (Saved by the Bell)

== Games ==
- Aftermath, a 2012 DLC for Battlefield 3
- Aftermath!, a 1981 science fiction role-playing game
- Half-Life 2: Aftermath or Half-Life 2: Episode One, a 2006 first-person shooter video game
- The Aftermath, a 1997 expansion pack for Command & Conquer: Red Alert
- UFO: Aftermath, a 2003 real-time strategy and tactics video game

== Literature ==
=== Fiction ===
- Aftermath (Burton novel), 1997, by LeVar Burton
- Aftermath (Robinson novel), 2001, by Peter Robinson
- Aftermath, a 2009 novel by Scott Campbell
- Aftermath, a 1998 Supernova Alpha novel by Charles Sheffield
- Star Wars: Aftermath trilogy, a 2015–2017 novel series by Chuck Wendig
- The Aftermath (novella), an unpublished novella by Stephen King
- The Aftermath, a 2007 novel in the Grand Tour series by Ben Bova
- The Aftermath, a 2013 novel by Rhidian Brook
- Aftermath, a 2021 novel by Preti Taneja
- The Aftermath, a 2021 Witch Creek Road Season 2 storyline by Garth Matthams and Kenan Halilović

=== Nonfiction ===
- Aftermath: On Marriage and Separation, a 2012 memoir by Rachel Cusk
- Aftermath: World Trade Center Archive, a 2006 book of photographs and text by Joel Meyerowitz
- Aftermath: Life in the Fallout of the Third Reich, 1945–1955, a book by Harald Jähner
- Aftermath: The Remnants of War, a 1996 book by Donovan Webster
- Aftermath: Violence and the Remaking of a Self, a 2002 book by Susan Brison
- The Aftermath, a volume of The World Crisis, Winston Churchill's account of the First World War

=== Other literature ===
- Aftermath, an 1873 collection of poetry by Henry Wadsworth Longfellow

== Music ==
=== Bands ===
- Aftermath (American band), a Chicago thrash band formed in 1985
- Aftermath (Bangladeshi band), a Dhaka alternative grunge rock band formed in 2007
- The Aftermath (Russian duo), a Russian singer-songwriter duo formed in 2004
- The Aftermath (Irish band), a mod/pop band formed in 2006

=== Albums ===
- Aftermath (Amy Lee soundtrack), from the film War Story, 2014
- Aftermath (Axenstar album), 2011
- Aftermath (Battery album) or the title song, 1998
- Aftermath (Fever Fever album) or the title song, 2014
- Aftermath (Hillsong United album) or the title song, 2011
- Aftermath (Rolling Stones album), 1966
- Aftermath, by Axenstar, 2011
- Aftermath, by Elizabeth Cook, 2020
- The Aftermath (Bonded by Blood album) or the title song, 2012
- The Aftermath (Da Youngsta's album) or the title song, 1993
- The Aftermath (Dystopia album), 1999
- The Aftermath (Jonathan Coulton album), 2009
- The Aftermath (Midnattsol album) or the title song, 2018
- The Aftermath, by Kashmir, 2005
- The Aftermath, by Wade Forster, 2026
- Dr. Dre Presents: The Aftermath or the title song, 1996

=== Songs ===
- "Aftermath" (Adam Lambert song), 2011
- "Aftermath" (Muse song), 2016
- "Aftermath" (R.E.M. song), 2004
- "Aftermath" (Tricky song), 1995
- "Aftermath", byAd Infinitum from Abyss, 2024
- "Aftermath", by The Black Dahlia Murder from Servitude, 2024
- "Aftermath", by Candlemass from Chapter VI, 1992
- "Aftermath", by Caravan Palace from Robot Face, 2015
- "Aftermath", by Coldrain from Fateless, 2017
- "Aftermath", by Crown the Empire from Retrograde, 2016
- "Aftermath", by Edge of Sanity from Crimson II, 2003
- "Aftermath", by The Ghost Inside from The Ghost Inside, 2020
- "Aftermath", by Gothminister from Pandemonium II: The Battle of the Underworlds, 2024
- "Aftermath", by Joe Budden from Mood Muzik 4: A Turn 4 the Worst, 2010
- "Aftermath", by Killswitch Engage from This Consequence, 2025
- "Aftermath", by Kiuas from Lustdriven, 2010
- "Aftermath", by Nightmares on Wax from A Word of Science: The First and Final Chapter, 1991
- "Aftermath", by Persuader from The Fiction Maze, 2014
- "Aftermath", by Phish from Phish, 1986
- "Aftermath", by the Rolling Stones, 1965
- "Aftermath", by Rolo Tomassi from Time Will Die and Love Will Bury It, 2018
- "Aftermath", a section of the Rush song "By-Tor and the Snow Dog" from Fly by Night, 1975
- "Aftermath", by Sonic Syndicate from Only Inhuman, 2007
- "Aftermath", by Strapping Young Lad from Strapping Young Lad, 2003
- "Aftermath", by SZA from S, 2013
- "Aftermath", by War of Ages from Pride of the Wicked, 2006
- "Aftermath", by Yngwie Malmsteen from I Can't Wait, 1994
- "Aftermath (Here We Go)", by Dave Audé, 2014
- "The Aftermath", by Bob Seger and the Silver Bullet Band from Like a Rock, 1986
- "The Aftermath", by Despised Icon from Beast, 2016
- "The Aftermath", by Iron Maiden from The X Factor, 1995
- "The Aftermath", by Kashmir from Zitilites, 2003
- "The Aftermath", by Origin from Antithesis, 2008
- "The Aftermath", by Wolves at the Gate from Types & Shadows, 2016
- "The Aftermath (The Guillotine III)", by Escape the Fate from Escape the Fate, 2010

== Other uses ==
- The Aftermath, a season of the Discordian calendar

== See also ==
- AfterMASH, an American sitcom
