= To Live A Lie =

American Independent record label based in Raleigh, North Carolina

- Founded: 2005
- Founder: Will Butler
- Genre: Rock, Powerviolence
- Country of origin: United States
- Location: Raleigh, North Carolina
- Official website: www.tolivealie.com

To Live A Lie is an American Independent record label, based in Raleigh, North Carolina, founded in 2005 by Will Butler.

The label has released albums by bands such as Magrudergrind, ACxDC, Agathocles, Godstomper, WVRM, Unholy Grave, XBRAINIAX, Despise You, Suffering Luna and Backslider. Some of the artists, who recorded for the label include Assholeparade, Torch Runner, Funeral Chic, Nashgul and Sex Prisoner.

== History ==
The record label was founded in 2005 and it debuted in August 2005, with a split 7-inch featuring California's Godstomper and Maryland's Magrudergrind.

In January 2014, the company organized its inaugural festival, To Live A Lie Records Fest in Raleigh, which was also attended by Sex Prisoner and Assholeparade.

In 2020, the label started to be the exclusive mailorder of 625 Thrashcore.

In December 2021, the label helped set up and host two memorial shows for John Rivera from Headfirst Records/Punks On Paper alongside 533 Uprisings, Paul Genet, Bitter Melody Records, and Caroline Weiss .

== Notable artists ==
- Agathocles
- Amps for Christ
- Assholeparade
- ACxDC
- Bastard Noise
- Beartrap
- Despise You
- Dry Socket
- Gasp
- Gel
- Magrudergrind
- Sex Prisoner
- Suffering Luna
- Spy
- Torch Runner
- Pig City
- Regional Justice Center
- Unholy Grave
- Venomous Concept
- Violencia
- XBRAINIAX

== Discography ==
| Year | Albums(s) | Artist(s) |
|---|---|---|
| 2005 | A Killer Combo | Godstomper, Magrudergrind |
| 2005 | Rhino Charge | Rhino Charge |
| 2005 | Sixty Two Trax Of Thrash | Magrudergrind |
| 2006 | Sick Life / Gate To Unholy Grave | Archagathus, Unholy Grave |
| 2006 | Split | I Object, F.P.O. |
| 2006 | Example | AxRxMx*, Final Draft |
| 2006 | Skate Attack! - Vol. 1 | Various |
| 2006 | Four Bands To Drain Your Pool | Badeatinghabits, NoComply, A.N.S., Rat Byte |
| 2006 | Are You Okay? | XBRAINIAX, NoComply |
| 2006 | Terminal Youth | Terminal Youth |
| 2006 | First Lesson | l.e.ä.r.n. |
| 2007 | Mehkago N.T. | Mehkago N.T. |
| 2007 | Crazed Development | Athrenody |
| 2007 | Alexandra's End / Mincing The Fascist | Agathocles, SMG |
| 2007 | War, Hate, & Misery | Bloody Phoenix |
| 2007 | Back To Hatevolution | Proletar |
| 2008 | Final Draft | Final Draft |
| 2008 | 2003 - 2007 Recordings | F.P.O. |
| 2008 | TLAL Three Year Sampler | Various |
| 2008 | Kakistocracy / Nux Vomica | Kakistocracy, Nux Vomica |
| 2008 | Slaughter-Extinction / Ucuz Can Pazarı | Archagathus, Sakatat |
| 2008 | Mesrine / P.L.F.* | Mesrine, P.L.F. |
| 2009 | Party By The Slice / ¡Malparido! | Party By The Slice, ¡Malparido! |
| 2009 | A Product Of Six Cents II | Various |
| 2009 | An International Grindcore Gathering Illegal Grinding | Various |
| 2009 | Hail Fastcore | XBRAINIAX |
| 2009 | Show Us The Meaning Of Haste | Hummingbird Of Death |
| 2009 | Deathrats | Deathrats |
| 2009 | To Live A Lie Records 2010 Sampler | Various |
| 2009 | Arctic Choke | Arctic Choke |
| 2009 | Split | Mondo Gecko, D9 |
| 2010 | To Live A Lie Records 2010 Sampler | Various |
| 2010 | Demo | Disciples Of Christ |
| 2011 | To Live A Lie Expanding Sampler | Various |
| 2011 | To Live A Lie Records 2012 Sampler | Various |
| 2011 | The Amazing End Of Everything | Don Garnelli |
| 2011 | A Painful Split | Capitalist Casualties, No Comply |
| 2012 | Committed To The Ground | Torch Runner |
| 2012 | Sleep Eradication | Beartrap |
| 2012 | Six Brew Bantha | Six Brew Bantha |
| 2012 | Blood Filled Bong | Suffering Luna |
| 2012 | Catheter / MassGrave | Catheter, MassGrave |
| 2013 | Planet Of Pestilence | Mindless |
| 2013 | Childhater | Total Fucking Destruction |
| 2013 | Antichrist Demoncore / Magnum Force / Sex Prisoner | Antichrist Demoncore, Magnum Force, Sex Prisoner |
| 2013 | Make 'Em Suffer | The Kill |
| 2013 | Last Words | Last Words |
| 2013 | Eschaton | Seasick |
| 2013 | Abuse | Abuse |
| 2013 | Suppression / NoComply | Suppression, NoComply |
| 2014 | Discography 03-13 | Antichrist Demoncore |
| 2014 | To Live A Lie - Volume II | Various |
| 2014 | Cave State | Cave State |
| 2014 | Weltschmerz | Chest Pain |
| 2014 | Chula Violence | Impulse |
| 2014 | Vermin Prolificus | Fistula |
| 2014 | Intravenously Commodified | Six Brew Bantha |
| 2015 | Sin Without Doubt | Holder's Scar |
| 2015 | Grind In The Mind | The Afternoon Gentlemen |
| 2015 | Fiction Monger | ACxDC |
| 2015 | Postcard | ACxDC |
| 2016 | 2008-2013 | Backslider |
| 2016 | Demo 2009 | Sex Prisoner |
| 2016 | Backbreaker | Impulse |
| 2016 | Hatred Swarm | Funeral Chic |
| 2016 | Softcore | Sick Shit |
| 2016 | The Primate's Advantage | Chest Pain |
| 2016 | Savage / Loathing | Loathing, Savage |
| 2016 | Triac / Sick/Tired | Triac, Sick, Tired |
| 2016 | Heartache | WVRM |
| 2016 | Cárcava | Nashgul |
| 2016 | Ulterior Motives | Lowhangers |
| 2016 | Life Of Crime | Goolagoon |
| 2017 | Split | Beartrap, Hummingbird Of Death |
| 2017 | Deadbeat / BOAK | Deadbeat, BOAK |
| 2017 | Cave State / Concussive | Cave State, Concussive |
| 2017 | Death Dealer | Flash Out |
| 2017 | Sex Prisoner / Harm Done | Sex Prisoner, Harm Done |
| 2017 | Kill Them...All | The Kill |
| 2017 | Deconstruct | Oxidant |
| 2017 | Burnout | Burnout |
| 2017 | Despise You / Coke Bust | Despise You, Coke Bust |
| 2017 | 2009 - 2016 | Magnum Force |
| 2017 | Fluoride | Fluoride |
| 2017 | The Cocaine Wars 1974-1989 | Crom |
| 2017 | Hot Summerian Nights | Crom |
| 2017 | Forbidden Techniques | Hummingbird Of Death |
| 2017 | Can You Hear The Wind Howl | WVRM |
| 2017 | Marxbros & Travølta | Marxbros, Travølta |
| 2017 | Sore For Days Demo 96 | Gasp |
| 2017 | Impediment | Sidetracked |
| 2017 | Demo | Faim |
| 2018 | Demolition | Realize |
| 2018 | Antichrist Demoncore / Goolagoon | Antichrist Demoncore, Goolagoon |
| 2018 | Blight | Sixbrewbantha |
| 2018 | World Of Inconvenience | Regional Justice Center |
| 2018 | Roman Numeral One | Bruised Ego |
| 2018 | The Undeserving Cassette | God's America |
| 2018 | To Live A Lie Volume III | Various |
| 2018 | Split | Reeking Cross, Escuela |
| 2018 | Third | MOOM |
| 2018 | Silenced | Tired Of Everything |
| 2018 | Agathocles / Slund | Agathocles, Slund |
| 2018 | Primal Code | Burnout |
| 2019 | Terminal Decline | Pig City |
| 2019 | One Party System | Neckbeard Deathcamp, Terminal Nation |
| 2019 | Disentanglement | Fluoride |
| 2019 | Hollowed Out | Sidetracked |
| 2019 | Humans Are Actual Pain | Beyond Pain |
| 2019 | Future Shocks | Glue Traps |
| 2019 | Painmaker | Brainxtoilet |
| 2019 | Old Man | Calques |
| 2019 | Ugly | Betrayal |
| 2019 | Needle | Needle |
| 2019 | Crypt Hammer | Crypt Hammer |
| 2019 | Last Laugh | No/Más |
| 2019 | Demo II | Regional Justice Center |
| 2019 | No Light Below | Joy |
| 2019 | Split | Slund, Sick Shit |
| 2019 | A Demonstration of Mankind's Supremacy | Mediated Form |
| 2019 | Don't Remember Me For This | Timelost |
| 2019 | In Tinnitus We Crust | Travølta |
| 2019 | The First Two Years | World Peace |
| 2020 | Surge | Bas Rotten |
| 2020 | Stardonas | Gasp |
| 2020 | Hindsight | Life's Torment |
| 2020 | 2009-2019: 10 Años de Poderviolencia | Chulo |
| 2020 | 4-Way Split | Neckbeard Deathcamp, Closet Witch, Racetraitor, Haggathorn |
| 2020 | Definition Of Insanity | Human Obliteration |
| 2020 | Split | Sidetracked, Suppression |
| 2020 | Indoctrination | Escuela Grind |
| 2020 | Internal Bleeding | No Question |
| 2020 | Gel | Gel |
| 2020 | Life Is Pain Life Is Shit | Livid |
| 2020 | Gentrified Swamp | Leachate |
| 2020 | Behind The Blade | Tired Of Everything |
| 2020 | Demo 2020 | Fading Signal |
| 2020 | The Oracles Of Death | Antichrist Demoncore |
| 2020 | Split | Sidetracked, The Seeker |
| 2020 | Satan Is King | Antichrist Demoncore |
| 2020 | Uniform Repression | Peace Test |
| 2020 | Split | Fuck On The Beach, Endless Swarm |
| 2020 | Very Best Of Antichrist Demoncore | Antichrist Demoncore |
| 2020 | Shitstormtrooper | Shitstormtrooper |
| 2020 | Service Weapon | Spy |
| 2020 | Chaos In Tejas 2011 | Capitalist Casualties |
| 2020 | Dweller | Sidetracked |
| 2020 | Split | Fuck On The Beach, Noise Nihilist |
| 2021 | Despair Anthems | Executioner's Mask |
| 2021 | Split | Knoll, Autolith |
| 2021 | Habitual Offender | Spy |
| 2021 | Split | Trappist, Hetze |
| 2021 | Sincere Flattery Vol. 1 | Various |
| 2021 | Sincere Flattery Vol. 2 | Various |
| 2021 | Drome Triler Of Puzzle Zoo People | Gasp |
| 2021 | The Crossroads Of Agony / Cliff Parade | Bastard Noise, Amps for Christ |
| 2021 | Shiver | Dry Socket |
| 2021 | The Future Is Yours | Death Toll 80k |
| 2021 | Gushing Interest | Timelost |
| 2021 | Subservient | Con Artist |
| 2021 | Scag | Scag |
| 2021 | Atropello | Campaña Del Terror |
| 2021 | Split | Antichrist Demoncore, Pig City |
| 2021 | Post-Human Godhood | Cryptic Void |
| 2021 | tinge. | Ixias |
| 2021 | West Side Horizons | Despise You |
| 2022 | East Coast Powerviolence | NoComply |
| 2022 | Under Attack | Under Attack |
| 2022 | Greyhound | Greyhound |
| 2022 | Global Grindcore Alliance Vol 2.0 | Chulo |
| 2022 | Cry Now, Cry Later | Eärthdögs |
| 2022 | Glory Be To The Bomb | Obsolete Man |
| 2022 | Bleak Future / Voglio Un Po | Life's Torment, God's America |
| 2022 | Backlash / Grateful | Life's Torment, Ugly |
| 2022 | Split | No Comply, Sidetracked |
| 2022 | Pry | Peace Test |
| 2022 | Power To The People | Herida Profunda |
| 2022 | The Second Raid | Houkago Grind Time |
| 2022 | To The Max | No Comply, They Live |
| 2022 | Psychic Rot | Backslider |
| 2022 | The Rain In Endless Fall | Prayer For Cleansing |
| 2022 | Post Collapse Cannibal Fantasy | Deliriant Nerve |
| 2022 | Cortadas | Corvo |
| 2022 | Split | Teething, Nashgul |
| 2022 | The Kids Are Alright | Venomous Concept, Under Attack |
| 2022 | Organic | Rot |
| 2022 | Arahant | Hogg |
| 2022 | ばすこ | Basuko |
| 2023 | Night People | Endorphins Lost |
| 2023 | Dragged | Dragged |
| 2023 | The Cocaine Wars 1974-1989 Remastered | Crom |

== See also ==
- List of record labels
- List of independent record labels
