= The Aftermath (Dystopia album) =

Studio album by Dystopia
- Released: 1999
- Recorded: 1995–98
- Genre: Sludge metal; crust punk
- Length: 44:27
- Label: Life Is Abuse

Dystopia chronology
Backstabber (1997)	The Aftermath (1999)	Dystopia (2008)

Professional ratings
Review scores
Source	Rating
Allmusic	3/5 stars

The Aftermath is the second album by American crust punk/sludge metal band Dystopia. It was originally released in 1999 as a four-track LP on Life Is Abuse Records, and as a 13-track CD featuring additional songs from their splits with Skaven and Suffering Luna, the Backstabber EP, and one unreleased cover, on Life Is Abuse Records, Misanthropic Records and Crawlspace Records. The final song, "Cosmetic Plague", begins near the end of track 12, and is a Rudimentary Peni cover. The LP version contains tracks 1–4 on side A and has an etching on side B.

== Track listing ==
No.	Title	Length
1.	"Population Birth Control"	5:48
2.	"Father's Gun"	2:26
3.	"Self Defeating Prophecy"	5:21
4.	"Sleep"	6:05
5.	"Socialized Death Sentence"	3:09
6.	"Backstabber"	2:12
7.	"They Live"	2:39
8.	"Anger Brought by Disease"	2:51
9.	"Jarhead Fertilizer"	3:44
10.	"Taste Your Own Medicine"	1:50
11.	"Instrumental"	3:12
12.	"Diary of a Battered Child"	4:02
13.	"Cosmetic Plague (Rudimentary Peni cover, hidden track)"	1:02
Total length:		44:27

=== Notes ===
- Tracks 1–4 originally appeared on the vinyl version of The Aftermath.
- Tracks 5–7 originally appeared on the Backstabber EP.
- Tracks 8–11 originally appeared on the split with Skaven.
- Track 12 originally appeared on the split with Suffering Luna.
- Track 4 is a re-recorded song, the original appeared on Dystopia's split with Grief.

== Personnel ==
- Todd Kiessling – bass
- Anthony "Dino" Sommese – vocals, drums
- Matt "Mauz" Parrilo – guitar, vocals, typography, artwork
- Steve McCurry – album cover
