= Dystopia (disambiguation) =

A dystopia is a community or society that is in some important way undesirable or frightening.

Dystopia may also refer to:

- Dystopia (video game), a 2005 Source Game Engine modification
- Dystopia (band), a sludge metal/crust punk band
- Dystopia (Babes in Toyland album) (1994)
- Dystopia (Beneath the Massacre album) (2008)
- Dystopia (Dystopia album) (2008)
- Dystopia (Iced Earth album) (2011) or its title track
- Dystopia (Megadeth album) (2016)
- Dystopia (Midnight Juggernauts album) (2007) or its title track
- Dystopia (song), a song by Megadeth,
- "Dystopia", a song by Kreator from Enemy of God
- Dystopia (TV series), a 2019 live action web series

== See also ==
- Dystopia canthorum
