= Human = Garbage =

Studio album by Dystopia
- Released: 1994
- Recorded: September–December, 1992; February 1994
- Genres: Sludge metal; crust punk
- Length: 27:01; 72:18 (CD)
- Labels: Life is Abuse, Common Cause, Misanthropic Records
- Producers: Jim Barnes, Dystopia

Dystopia chronology
| Dystopia / Embittered (1992) | Human = Garbage (1994) | Dystopia / Suffering Luna (1995) |

Professional ratings
Review scores
| Source | Rating |
|---|---|
| BraveWords | 9.0/10 stars |
| Pitchfork | favorable |
| Punknews.org | 4.5/5 stars |

Human = Garbage is the debut studio album by the American band Dystopia, released originally as a 12-inch EP through Life is Abuse, Common Cause, and Misanthropic Records. The record was later reissued on CD format containing a set of bonus tracks taken from the band’s 1992 demo tape, when they were a 4-piece band. They recorded 7 songs in 1992 with Dan Kaufman as their lead vocalist, and titled it as “Live In The Studio Demo,” and released two versions of it with different artwork / design. As of 1994, Kaufman was no longer part of Dystopia, and so a 3-piece band they remained until they split.

The five tracks from the original EP were recorded throughout February 1994, the first session starting at a mere three hours after bassist Todd Kiessling was bailed out of jail. According to Kiessling, he was arrested for trying to purchase an item with counterfeit money. He was, however, unaware of the currency's dubious status at the time of arrest. According to the liner notes of the CD edition of the record, all of the artwork was composed of various pictures and magazines that the band found in abandoned stacks of printed material in alleyways, trash cans and/or dumpsters.

The CD edition of the album (released in 1998/1999) was reissued on vinyl formats in 2014. At that time, the album was pressed on double vinyl through Tankcrimes.

== Track listing ==
| No. | Title | Length |
|---|---|---|
| 1. | "Stress Builds Character" | 5:49 |
| 2. | "Hands That Mold" | 6:12 |
| 3. | "Sanctity" | 6:08 |
| 4. | "Ignorance of Pride" | 3:24 |
| 5. | "Love/Hate" | 4:41 |

CD edition bonus tracks
| No. | Title | Taken from | Length |
|---|---|---|---|
| 6. | "The Middle" | split LP with Embittered | 1:40 |
| 7. | "Slave Chains" | split LP with Embittered | 2:36 |
| 8. | "Ruptured Silence" | split LP with Embittered | 4:19 |
| 9. | "Green Destroyed" | split LP with Embittered | 2:28 |
| 10. | "Broken Shell" | previously unreleased | 3:01 |
| 11. | "Weed of Wisdom" | split LP with Embittered | 4:26 |
| 12. | "Sleep" (contains hidden track) | split 7-inch with Grief | 27:34 |

== Personnel ==
=== Dystopia ===
- Todd Kiessling - bass
- Anthony "Dino" Sommese - vocals, drums
- Matt "Mauz" Parrilo - guitar, vocals, typography, artwork

=== Other personnel ===
- Dan Kaufman - vocals (tracks 6 through 12)
- Michael Nicoles - photography
- Robert Vandoran - photography
- Jim Barnes - production
- Michael Perniski - typography
- Vomet BDF - artwork, typography
