= Chapter VIII =

Studio album by Axenstar
- Released: 1 December 2023
- Studios: Axenstar Studios; Studio Underground, Västerås, Sweden; Bilda Studion in Söderhamn, Gävleborg, Sweden
- Genre: Power metal
- Length: 45:23
- Label: Inner Wound Recordings

Axenstar chronology
End of All Hope (2019)	Chapter VIII (2023)

Professional ratings
Review scores
Source	Rating
Metal.de	6/10
Metal Temple	8/10
Powermetal.de	7/10
Rock Hard	7.5/10
Scream Magazine	3/6
Metal Hammer Germany	3.5/7

Chapter VIII is the eighth studio album by power metal band Axenstar. It was released on 1 December 2023 via Inner Wound Recordings. Production of the album was marred with difficulties including the COVID-19 pandemic and their drummer Hampus Fasth leaving the band two months after the release of their previous album End of All Hope. Fasth was replaced by Morgana Lefay drummer Pelle Åkerlind. Music videos were released for "Heavenly Symphony" and "The Flame of Victory".

== Track listing ==
1. "Heavenly Symphony" - 4:44
2. "Through the Fire and Brimstone" - 5:11
3. "The Great Deceiver" - 4:32
4. "Enchanted Lands" - 2:41
5. "The Flame of Victory" - 4:12
6. "No Surrender" - 3:42
7. "Holy Land" - 6:01
8. "Eye for an Eye" - 5:15
9. "The War Within" - 5:00
10. "Life Eternal" - 4:05

== Personnel ==
- Magnus Winterwild - vocals, bass, keyboards
- Joakim Jonsson - guitars
- Jens Klovegård - guitars
- Pelle Åkerlind - drums
