= LeVar Burton =

American actor, director, and television host (born 1957)

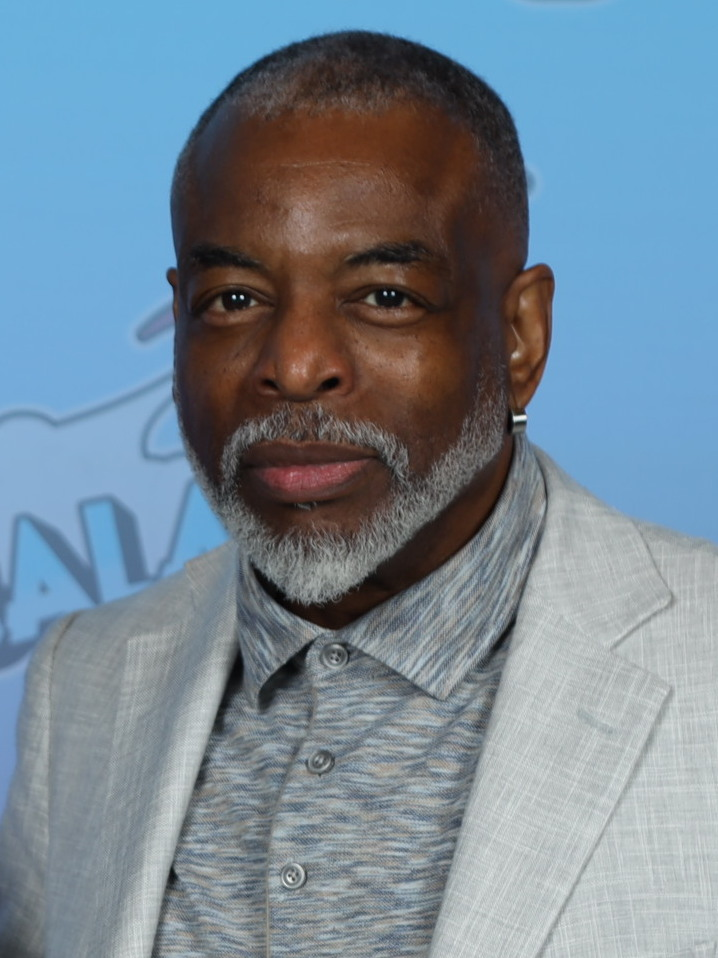
- Burton at the 2023 GalaxyCon Raleigh
- Born: Levardis Robert Martyn Burton; February 16, 1957 (age 69); Landstuhl, West Germany
- Citizenship: United States
- Education: University of Southern California
- Occupations: Actor, television host, director, author
- Years active: 1976–present
- Spouse: Stephanie Cozart (m. 1992)
- Children: 2, including Mica
- Awards: See Awards
- Website: levarburton.com

Levardis Robert Martyn Burton (born February 16, 1957) is an American actor, director, and television host. He played Geordi La Forge in Star Trek: The Next Generation (1987–1994) and Kunta Kinte in the ABC miniseries Roots (1977), and was the host of the PBS Kids educational television series Reading Rainbow for 23 years (1983–2006). Burton received 12 Daytime Emmy Awards and a Peabody Award as host and executive producer of Reading Rainbow.

His other roles include Cap Jackson in Looking for Mr. Goodbar (1977), Donald Lang in Dummy (1979), Tommy Price in The Hunter (1980), which earned him an NAACP Image Award for Outstanding Actor in a Motion Picture, and Martin Luther King Jr. in Ali (2001). Burton received the Grammy Award for Best Spoken Word Album at the 42nd Annual Grammy Awards for his narration of the book The Autobiography of Martin Luther King Jr. In 1990, he was honored for his accomplishments in television with a star on the Hollywood Walk of Fame.

From 2017 until 2024, Burton created and hosted the podcast LeVar Burton Reads, which has been described as "Reading Rainbow for adults". Since October 2024, Burton has hosted the Trivial Pursuit game show on The CW.

== Early life ==
Burton was born as Levardis Robert Burton Jr. on February 16, 1957, in Landstuhl, West Germany. His mother, Erma Gene (née Ward), was a social worker, administrator, and educator. Burton and his two sisters were raised by his mother in Sacramento, California, United States.

Burton's father, also named LeVar, was a photographer for the U.S. Army Signal Corps stationed at Landstuhl at the time of his son's birth. His paternal grandparents were both educators in rural Arkansas. His great-great grandfather, Hal B. Burton, was an African-American state legislator in Arkansas after the Reconstruction era that enfranchised African Americans in the South after the American Civil War; he was elected to represent Jefferson County in 1887.

Burton went by the name Bob Burton from 1st grade until he entered college. Then, in an effort to manifest fame, he decided to be called LeVar because it rhymes with "star".

Burton was raised Catholic. Upon his confirmation in the church, he took on Martyn and dropped Jr. as a part of his name. As a teen, Burton entered St. Pius X Minor Seminary in Galt, California, intending to become a priest. At the age of 17, questioning the Catholic faith, he changed his vocation to acting. At the age of 19, while an undergraduate at the University of Southern California, he received a starring role in the 1977 television miniseries Roots.

== Career ==
=== Early work ===
Burton made his acting debut in 1977 with Almos' a Man, a television film based on the Richard Wright short story, "The Man Who Was Almost a Man", in which Burton stars alongside Madge Sinclair. He also played Cap Jackson in Looking for Mr. Goodbar (1977), Donald Lang in Dummy (1979), and Tommy Price in The Hunter (1980), which earned him an NAACP Image Award for Outstanding Actor in a Motion Picture. In the late 1970s, Burton accepted an invitation to host Rebop, a multicultural television series designed for young people aged 9–15, produced by WGBH for PBS.

=== Roots ===
Burton's breakthrough role was as the young Kunta Kinte in the ABC miniseries Roots (1977), based on the novel of the same name by Alex Haley. Burton has described his first day playing Kunta as the start of his professional career. As a result of his performance, he was nominated for an Emmy in the Outstanding Lead Actor for a Single Appearance in a Drama or Comedy Series category.

He reprised the role of Kunta Kinte in the 1988 television film Roots: The Gift. When asked about the societal influence of Roots, Burton is quoted as saying: "It expanded the consciousness of people. Blacks and whites began to see each other as human beings, not as stereotypes. And if you throw a pebble into the pond, you're going to get ripples. I think the only constant is change, and it's always slow. Anything that happens overnight is lacking in foundation. Roots is part of a changing trend, and it's still being played out."

=== Reading Rainbow ===
Burton was the host and executive producer of Reading Rainbow starting in 1983 for PBS. The series ran for 23 seasons.

After Reading Rainbow went off the air in 2006, Burton and his business partner, Mark Wolfe, acquired the global rights to the brand and formed RRKIDZ, a new media company for children. Reading Rainbow was reimagined as an all new application for the iPad in 2012, and was an immediate success, becoming the number-one educational application within 36 hours. At RRKIDZ, Burton serves as co-founder and curator-in-chief, ensuring that the projects produced under the banner meet the high expectations and trust of the Reading Rainbow brand.

On May 28, 2014, Burton and numerous coworkers from other past works started a Kickstarter campaign project to bring back Reading Rainbow. To keep with the changing formats to which young children are exposed, his efforts are being directed at making this new program web based, following the success of the tablet application he helped create in recent years. His desire is to have the new Reading Rainbow be integrated into the classrooms of elementary schools across the country, and for schools in need to have free access. The Kickstarter campaign has since raised more than $5 million, reaching triple its goal in only three days.

In 2017, Burton was sued by the public broadcasting company WNED-TV for alleged copyright infringement for use of the Reading Rainbow brand in marketing the new iPad app and other online media. RRKIDZ later became known as LeVar Burton Kids and the iPad app, Skybrary.

=== Star Trek: The Next Generation ===
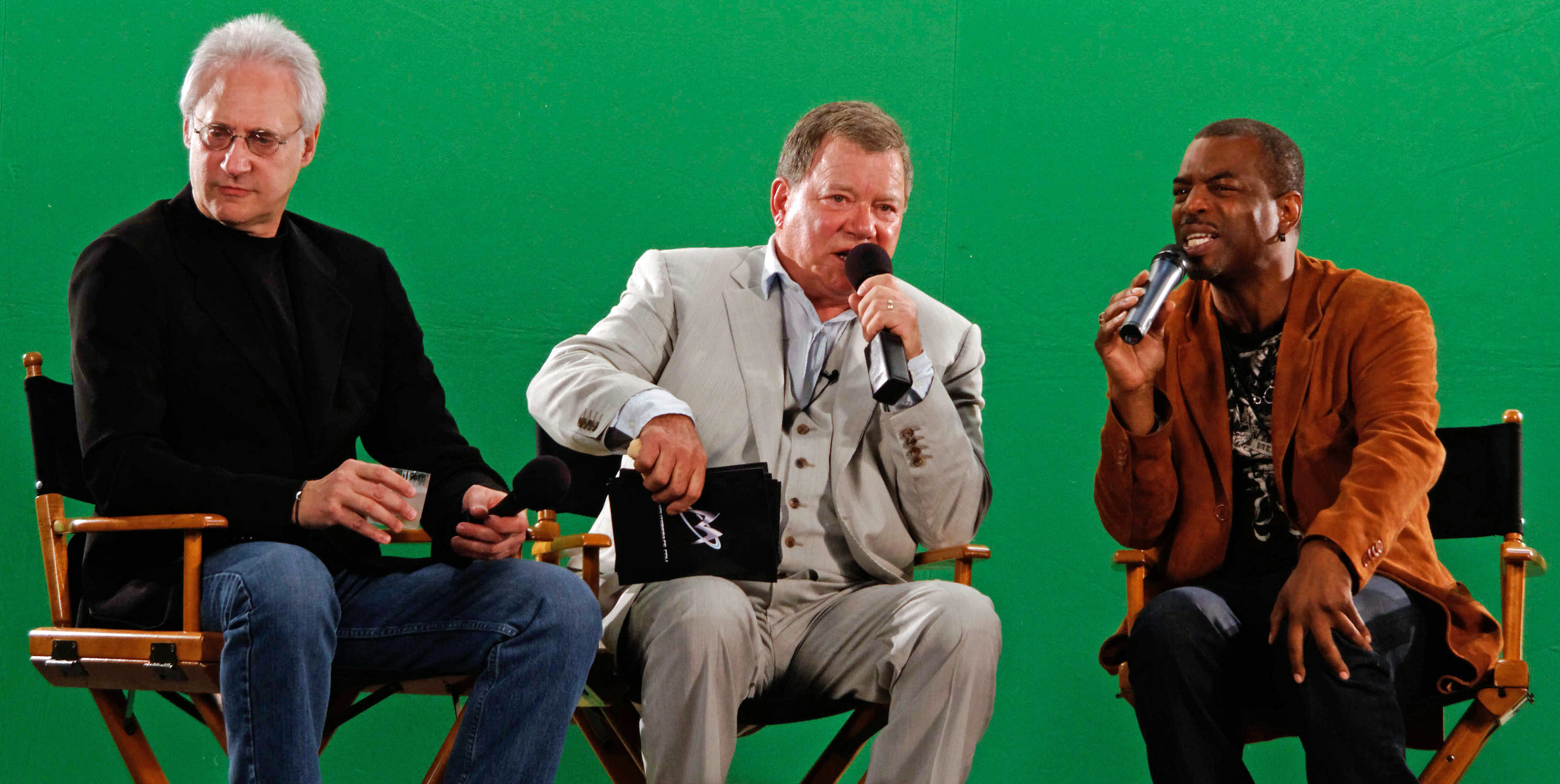
Burton with Brent Spiner and William Shatner in July 2010

In 1986, Gene Roddenberry approached Burton with the role of Lieutenant Junior Grade Geordi La Forge in the Star Trek: The Next Generation television series. The character is blind but is granted "sight" through the use of a prosthetic device called a VISOR worn over his eyes. La Forge began as the USS Enterprise's helmsman, and as of the show's second season, had become its chief engineer. At the time, Burton was considerably better known than Patrick Stewart in the United States, due to his roles in Roots and Reading Rainbow. When the show premiered, the Associated Press stated that Burton's role was essentially the "new Spock". In a 2019 interview, Burton laughed in disbelief at the idea, stating "that speculation never came to fruition." Burton also portrayed La Forge in the subsequent feature films based on Star Trek: The Next Generation, from Star Trek Generations (1994) to Star Trek: Nemesis (2002). He directed two episodes of Star Trek: The Next Generation and several episodes of Star Trek: Deep Space Nine, Star Trek: Voyager, and Star Trek: Enterprise. He reprised the role of La Forge in the third and final season of Star Trek: Picard (2023).

=== Podcast: LeVar Burton Reads ===
In 2017, Burton began a podcast, LeVar Burton Reads. Each 30-45-minute episode features Burton reading a piece of short fiction and sharing his thoughts on it. In 2020, during the COVID-19 pandemic, he continued to read on his podcast and also gave live readings three times a week during a Twitter livestream focused at different times to different children, young adults, and adult audiences.

In reviews, the podcast is often described as "Reading Rainbow for adults". Since its launch, LeVar Burton Reads has won favorable reviews, in The New Yorker and elsewhere and numerous awards, including the 2023 Webby Award for Best Art and Culture Podcast. Burton's five-word Webby acceptance speech was: "Be a better person. Read."

In 2023, Burton launched a second podcast, this time for children, called Sound Detectives.

=== Trivial Pursuit ===
On October 3, 2024, Burton began hosting a revival of the game show Trivial Pursuit on The CW. A second season is expected to premiere in 2026.

=== Other appearances ===
On television, Burton played a visitor to Fantasy Island, guest starred on The Love Boat, was a participant in Battle of the Network Stars, and a guest of The Muppet Show's televised premiere party for the release of The Muppet Movie. He was also a frequent guest on several game shows, including a celebrity guest on the Dick Clark-hosted $25,000 and $100,000 Pyramids, from 1982 until 1988.

Burton also appeared in several television movies. He portrayed Detroit Tiger Ron LeFlore in One in a Million: The Ron LeFlore Story (1978), helped dramatize the last days of Jim Jones's suicide cult in Guyana in Guyana Tragedy: The Story of Jim Jones (1980), appeared in the Jesse Owens biographical film The Jesse Owens Story (1984), and was in the nine-year-old Booker T. Washington biographical film Booker (1984).

In 1986, he appeared in the music video for the song "Word Up!" by the funk/R&B group Cameo.

In 1987, Burton played Dave Robinson, a journalist (sports writer), in the third season of Murder, She Wrote, episode 16 – "Death Takes a Dive", starring Angela Lansbury as Jessica Fletcher.

In 1992, a clip of Burton's voice was sampled by DC Talk for the track "Time is..." on their album Free at Last. The sample is at the very end of the song, in which Burton can be heard saying: "Whoa, wait a minute." He has also lent his voice to several animated projects, including Kwame in the cartoon series Captain Planet and the Planeteers (1990–1993) and The New Adventures of Captain Planet (1993–1996), Our Friend, Martin (1999), Family Guy, Batman: The Animated Series and Gargoyles. Burton is on the audio version of books such as The Watsons Go to Birmingham: 1963 by Christopher Paul Curtis. Burton has been cast as voice actor for Black Lightning in Superman/Batman: Public Enemies DVD.

In the 2000s, Burton made appearances in such sitcoms as Becker. He also portrayed Martin Luther King Jr. in the 2001 film Ali.

In 2001, Burton also was the strongest link in the special Star Trek episode of The Weakest Link. He defeated his final opponent Robert Picardo and won $167,500 for his charity, Junior Achievement of Southern California, a record for the show at that time and the largest amount won in any Celebrity Edition of the show (it was later surpassed by a $188,500 win in a "Tournament of Losers" episode).

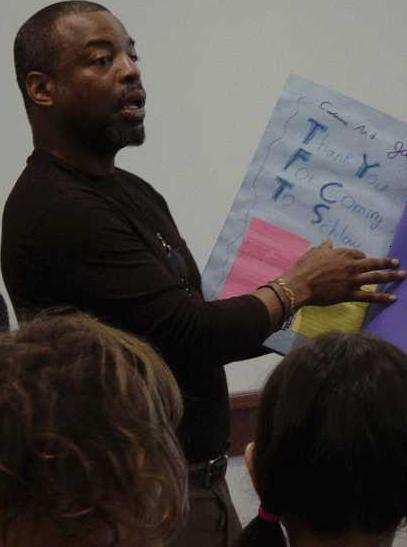
Burton at the Schlow Centre Region Library, January 29, 2007

Burton is the host and executive producer of a documentary titled The Science of Peace, which was in production as of 2007. It investigates the science and technology aimed at enabling world peace, sometimes called peace science. The film explores some of the concepts of shared noetic consciousness, having been sponsored in part by the Institute of Noetic Sciences.

He appeared in an April Fool's 2009 episode of Smosh pretending to have taken over the channel and making various edits at popular Smosh videos.

He makes occasional appearances on This Week in Tech, where he is a self-proclaimed "nerd", and also participated in the Consumer Electronics Show 2010.

In 2010, Burton made an appearance on Tim and Eric Awesome Show, Great Job! as the ghost of himself in the episode "Greene Machine". In February 2011, he made an appearance as himself on NBC's Community in the episode "Intermediate Documentary Filmmaking", and then again in January 2014's "Geothermal Escapism".

Burton has appeared as a fictionalized, humorous version of himself on The Big Bang Theory, first appearing in the episode "The Toast Derivation", in which he almost attends a party thrown by Sheldon (before swearing off Twitter), in November 2012 in the episode "The Habitation Configuration", in which he appears on "Fun With Flags" in exchange for lunch and gas money, and again in the November 2014 episode "The Champagne Reflection", in which he returns for the 232nd episode of "Fun With Flags" in exchange for Sheldon deleting his contact details.

In 2012, he had a recurring role as dean Paul Haley on the TNT series Perception. For the second season (2013), he became part of the regular cast.

In 2014, he had a guest appearance in an introduction section for the 200th episode of Achievement Hunter's show, Achievement Hunter Weekly Update (AHWU). In May 2014, he appeared as a guest on the YouTube channel SciShow, explaining the science behind double, tertiary, and quaternary rainbows. Late in 2014, he had another guest appearance on a 24-hour Extra Life, a fundraising organization for Children's Miracle Network hospitals, stream by Rooster Teeth. Burton has also taped a recycling field trip for YouTube.

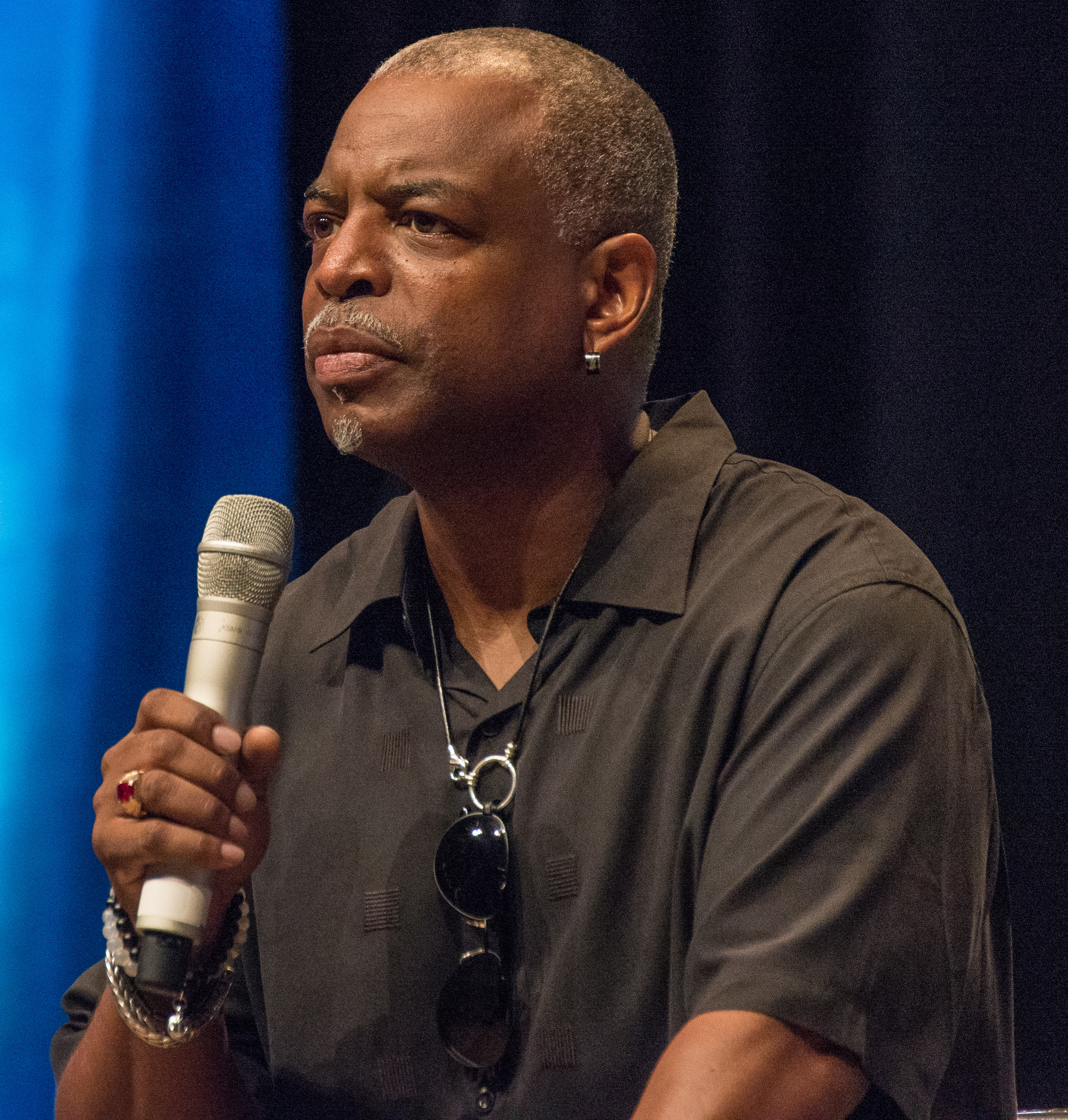
Burton in 2017

In November 2020, he appeared as himself on The Eric Andre Show. His segment was a callback to Lance Reddick's interview (2013) in which he mentioned LeVar by name and dressed as an amalgam of Kunta Kinte and Geordi La Forge.

Burton served as a guest host on Jeopardy! from July 26 to 30, 2021. This came after a petition asking the show's producers to select him was signed by more than 250,000 fans. The ratings during his appearance were below average due to tapering audience curiosity and forced viewership competition with NBC's coverage of the 2020 Summer Olympics in Tokyo, which trampled syndicated shows across the board. He has been very critical of the show's guest host process, stating that the show's then executive producer Mike Richards expressed disbelief about Burton wanting the job. According to Burton, Richards also claimed to have no interest in hosting the show himself even though this was disproven by later events. However, he would later say that the experience taught him that there is a "perfect nature of all things".

In June 2022, Burton hosted the 94th Scripps National Spelling Bee.

Burton also teaches the "Power of Storytelling" in the MasterClass.

=== Directing ===
Throughout the 1990s and early 2000s, Burton directed episodes for each of the various Star Trek series then in production. He has directed more Star Trek episodes than any other former regular cast member.

He has also directed episodes of Charmed, JAG, Las Vegas, Scorpion, and Soul Food: The Series, as well as the miniseries Miracle's Boys and the biopic The Tiger Woods Story. He also directed the 1999 Disney Channel Original Movie Smart House starring Katey Sagal, Kevin Kilner and Jessica Steen. In August 2020, it was revealed that Burton will sit in the director's chair for Two-Front War from Lou Reda Productions, a multi-perspective docuseries will give "an emotionally raw look at the connection between the fight for civil rights in America and the struggle for equality of Black soldiers in Vietnam".

His first theatrical film direction was Blizzard (2003), for which he received a "Best of Fest" award from the Chicago International Children's Film Festival, and a Genie Award nomination for his work on the film's theme song, "Center of My Heart".

For the Directors Guild of America, Burton was an alternate board director in 2000, elected to the board of directors in 2005 and re-elected in 2007.

For his commitment to public service, Burton was awarded the Common Wealth Award of Distinguished Service in 2023.

=== Advocacy ===
LeVar Burton has engaged in advocacy work on multiple causes including literacy, book censorship, and AIDS research. He has served on the board of directors for the AIDS Research Alliance, a non-profit, medical research organization dedicated to finding a cure for AIDS, since 2012. In 2023, he led the American Library Association's Banned Books Week as an honorary chair and organized signature campaign, Artists Against Book Bans. He also served as the executive producer for the documentary, The Right to Read, a film focused on promoting literacy as a civil-rights issue.

== Personal life ==
LeVar Burton married Stephanie Cozart, a professional make-up artist, on October 3, 1992. Burton has two children, including Mica Burton. The family lives in Sherman Oaks, California.

Burton does not identify with any religion, saying: "I walked away from the seminary, I walked away from Catholicism, I walked away from organized religion because I felt that there was more for me to explore in the world, and that I could do that without adhering to one specific belief system or another."

In 2016, Burton was one of the five inaugural honorees to the Sacramento Walk of Stars. In 2019, Councilmember Larry Carr, representing the Meadowview neighborhood, led the renaming of Richfield Park to LeVar Burton Park in his honor. The park is in the Meadowview neighborhood, near the house where Burton and his sisters grew up.

In 2024, while on the show Finding Your Roots, Burton discovered that he has a white, Confederate great-great-grandfather.

== Books ==
- Aftermath, 1997, ISBN 0-446-67960-7
- The Rhino Who Swallowed a Storm, 2014, ISBN 0-990-53950-4
- A Kids Book About Imagination, 2021, ISBN 978-1-953955-44-9
- Take My Word for It, 2026, ISBN 979-8217198276

== Awards and nominations ==
=== Emmy Awards ===
The Emmy Awards are presented annually by several divisions of the National Academy of Television Arts and Sciences to honor artistic and technical merit in the television industry. Burton has won 12 competitive awards from 33 nominations, as well as a Lifetime Achievement award.

| Year | Award | Nominated work | Result |
Children's and Family Emmy Awards
| 2022 | Lifetime Achievement Award | Himself | Honored |
Daytime Emmy Awards
| 1986 | Outstanding Performer in Children's Programming | Reading Rainbow | Nominated |
| 1987 | Outstanding Performer in Children's Programming | Reading Rainbow | Nominated |
| 1989 | Outstanding Children's Series | Reading Rainbow | Nominated |
| 1990 | Outstanding Children's Series | Reading Rainbow | Won |
| 1990 | Outstanding Performer in a Children's Series | Reading Rainbow | Nominated |
| 1991 | Outstanding Performer in a Children's Series | Reading Rainbow | Nominated |
| 1991 | Outstanding Children's Series | Reading Rainbow | Nominated |
| 1992 | Outstanding Children's Series | Reading Rainbow | Nominated |
| 1992 | Outstanding Performer in a Children's Series | Reading Rainbow | Nominated |
| 1993 | Outstanding Performer in a Children's Series | Reading Rainbow | Nominated |
| 1993 | Outstanding Children's Series | Reading Rainbow | Won |
| 1994 | Outstanding Children's Series | Reading Rainbow | Nominated |
| 1994 | Outstanding Performer in a Children's Series | Reading Rainbow | Nominated |
| 1995 | Outstanding Performer in a Children's Series | Reading Rainbow | Nominated |
| 1995 | Outstanding Children's Series | Reading Rainbow | Nominated |
| 1996 | Outstanding Children's Series | Reading Rainbow | Won |
| 1996 | Outstanding Performer in a Children's Series | Reading Rainbow | Nominated |
| 1997 | Outstanding Performer in a Children's Series | Reading Rainbow | Nominated |
| 1997 | Outstanding Children's Series | Reading Rainbow | Won |
| 1998 | Outstanding Children's Series | Reading Rainbow | Won |
| 1998 | Outstanding Performer in a Children's Series | Reading Rainbow | Nominated |
| 1999 | Outstanding Performer in a Children's Series | Reading Rainbow | Nominated |
| 1999 | Outstanding Children's Series | Reading Rainbow | Nominated |
| 2001 | Outstanding Children's Series | Reading Rainbow | Won |
| 2001 | Outstanding Performer in a Children's Series | Reading Rainbow | Won |
| 2002 | Outstanding Performer in a Children's Series | Reading Rainbow | Won |
| 2002 | Outstanding Children's Series | Reading Rainbow | Won |
| 2003 | Outstanding Children's Series | Reading Rainbow | Won |
| 2003 | Outstanding Performer in a Children's Series | Reading Rainbow | Nominated |
| 2005 | Outstanding Performer in a Children's Series | Reading Rainbow | Nominated |
| 2005 | Outstanding Children's Series | Reading Rainbow | Won |
| 2007 | Outstanding Children's Series | Reading Rainbow | Won |
| 2007 | Outstanding Performer in a Children's Series | Reading Rainbow | Nominated |
Primetime Emmy Awards
| 1977 | Outstanding Lead Actor for a Single Appearance in a Drama or Comedy Series | Roots | Nominated |
| 1996 | Outstanding Children's Program | LeVar Burton Presents — A Reading Rainbow Special: Act Against Violence | Nominated |
| 2016 | Outstanding Limited Series | Roots | Nominated |

=== Grammy Awards ===
The Grammy Awards are awarded annually by the National Academy of Recording Arts and Sciences. Burton has won 1 award from 3 nominations.

| Year | Award | Nominated work | Result |
|---|---|---|---|
| 1994 | Best Spoken Word or Non-Musical Album | Miles: The Autobiography | Nominated |
| 2000 | Best Spoken Word Album | The Autobiography of Martin Luther King, Jr. | Won |
| 2022 | Best Spoken Word Album (Includes Poetry, Audio Books & Storytelling) | Aftermath | Nominated |

=== NAACP Image Awards ===
The NAACP Image Awards are awarded annually by the National Association for the Advancement of Colored People (NAACP). Burton has won 5 awards from 8 nominations.

| Year | Award | Nominated work | Result |
|---|---|---|---|
| 1994 | Outstanding Performer in a Children's Series and Outstanding Youth or Children's Series/Special | Reading Rainbow | Won |
| 1996 | Outstanding Performer in a Children's Series and Outstanding Youth or Children's Series/Special | Reading Rainbow | Won |
| 1998 | Outstanding Performer in a Children's Series and Outstanding Youth or Children's Series/Special | Reading Rainbow | Nominated |
| 1999 | Outstanding Performer in a Children's Series and Outstanding Youth or Children's Series/Special | Reading Rainbow | Won |
| 2001 | Outstanding Performer in a Children's Series and Outstanding Youth or Children's Series/Special | Reading Rainbow | Nominated |
| 2002 | Outstanding Performer in a Children's Series and Outstanding Youth or Children's Series/Special | Reading Rainbow | Won |
| 2003 | Outstanding Performer in a Children's Series and Outstanding Youth or Children's Series/Special | Reading Rainbow | Won |
| 2005 | Outstanding Performer in a Children's Series and Outstanding Youth or Children's Series/Special | Reading Rainbow | Nominated |

=== Peabody Awards ===
The Peabody Awards are awarded annually to honor what are described as the most powerful, enlightening, and invigorating stories in all of television, radio, and online media. Burton has won 1 award.

| Year | Nominated work | Result |
|---|---|---|
| 1992 | Reading Rainbow: "The Wall" | Won |

=== Miscellaneous awards and honors ===
| Organization | Year | Award | Nominated work | Result |
|---|---|---|---|---|
| Audie Award | 2003 | Audie Award for Inspirational or Spiritual Title | Conversations with God for Teens | Won |
| Audie Award | 2010 | Audiobook of the Year | Nelson Mandela's Favorite African Folktales | Won |
| Audie Award | 2010 | Multi-Voiced Performance | Nelson Mandela's Favorite African Folktales | Won |
| Audie Award | 2012 | Audie Award for Original Work | METAtropolis: Cascadia | Won |
| Black Reel Award | 2006 | Best Director-Television | Miracle's Boys | Nominated |
| Chicago International Children's Film Festival | 2004 | Best of Fest | Blizzard | Won |
| Genie Award | 2004 | Best Achievement in Music-Original Song | Blizzard | Nominated |
| Hollywood Walk of Fame | 1990 | Star at 7030 Hollywood Boulevard for television achievement | Himself | Honored |
| Ignyte Awards | 2020 | Ember Award | Himself | Won |
| National Humanities Medal | 2023 | For literacy work | Himself | Honored |
| Saturn Awards | 2024 | Lifetime Achievement Award | The Cast of Star Trek: The Next Generation (Note: "The Lifetime Achievement Award is usually presented to an individual for their contributions to genre entertainment. Top luminaries like Stan Lee and Leonard Nimoy, Mr. Spock himself, have received this top honor. It's not new, but we extended this award to cover the entire cast of Star Trek: The Next Generation, due to its continued influence on the face of general television. It was originally doomed to failure since it was following in the footsteps of the original Star Trek, yet it carved its own identity, and its diverse cast was light years ahead of its time!" —Academy of Science Fiction, Fantasy and Horror Films) | Honored |
| Shorty Impact Awards | 2024 | Changemaker of the Year | Himself | Won |
| Television Critics Association Award | 2003 | Outstanding Achievement in Children's Programming | Reading Rainbow | Won |
