= The Man Who Was Almost a Man =

Short story

Eight Men
- First edition of Eight Men
- Author: Richard Wright
- Publisher: World Publishing Co.
- Publication date: 1961

"The Man Who Was Almost a Man," also known as "Almos' a Man," is a short story by Richard Wright. It was originally published in 1940 in Harper's Bazaar magazine, and again in 1961 as part of Wright's compilation Eight Men. The story centers on Dave, a 17-year-old young African-American farm worker who is struggling to declare his identity in the atmosphere of the rural South. The story was adapted into a movie in 1977, under the same name, "Almos' a Man," directed by Stan Lathan and starring LeVar Burton.

== Plot summary ==
The story begins with the protagonist, Dave Saunders, walking home from his job in a cattle farm, irritated with the way he's been treated. He decides to purchase a gun to prove to his co-workers that he is an adult. Instead of going home, he asks to look at the Sears Roebuck catalogue in a local store. The store owner, Fat Joe, asks Dave what he is planning on buying, a question Dave is reluctant to answer. Joe promises not to share, and Dave tells him he's looking to purchase a cannonball; Joe states that Dave "ain’t nothing but a boy," and that he does not need a gun, but if he's going to buy one, he might as well buy it from him and not from some catalogue. Joe offers to sell Dave a left-hand Wheeler for a low price. With interest aroused Dave leaves the store vowing to come return later.

His mother awaits him at home, annoyed at his late arrival. Throughout dinner, Dave is so infatuated with the catalogue that he does not touch the food in front of him or listen to his father. He decides to ask his mother for the money for the gun as his father is likely to turn him down.

Dave asks her after dinner, and she responds by saying, "[G]it outta here! Don yuh talk t' me bout no gun! Yuh a fool!" Dave persuades her, stating he will surrender it to his father. Mrs. Saunders gives Dave the two dollars, making him promise he will bring it straight home and turn it over to her.

Dave purchases the pistol from Joe and, on his way home, stops in the field to play with the gun. When he arrives at his house, he breaks his promise and does not surrender the gun. Dave awakens later in the night and, with the gun in his hands, thinks to himself that he now has the power to "kill anybody, black or white." He leaves the house early so he can go unnoticed and keep the gun.

Dave arrives at work early, so Mr. Hawkins tells him to hook up Jenny, the mule, and go plow the fields near the woods. Dave plans to use his time away to practice with the gun. When he gets out to the woods, Dave takes his first shot. The gun's kickback scares off the mule; however, he realizes Jenny has been shot, and the mule soon dies.

That night, Jenny's body is found and, when questioned, Dave lies about the incident. His mother insists Dave tell the truth. In tears, Dave confesses before lying again, claiming to have thrown the gun in a river. While Mr. Hawkins is understanding, he expects Dave to pay back the price of the mule over time.

Annoyed at everyone still viewing him as a child, he retrieves and fires it until empty. He approaches a train, hopping into with the hope this will at last prove he is indeed a man.

== Characters ==
- Dave Saunders (protagonist): Dave Saunders, a young African American male, is trapped in adolescence, struggling to have those around him view him as grown.
- Fat Joe: Fat Joe owns the local store where he agrees to sell a gun to Dave.
- Mr. Saunders (Pa): Mr. Saunders serves as a "phantom figure" but when present in the story acts as the stern disciplinary of the family.
- Mrs. Saunders (Ma): Unlike her husband, Mrs. Saunders is understanding and less demanding, often giving into Dave's propositions.
- Jim Hawkins: Jim employs Dave and owns the plantation that he works on. After the death of his mule, Hawkins shows understanding and compassion towards the young Dave while still expecting repayment.
- Jenny: Jenny the mule, owned by Jim Hawkins, works alongside Dave in the fields of the plantation before accidentally being killed by Dave.

== Symbolism ==
The Gun

For Dave, the gun serves as a symbol in many ways: it gives power or control, while bestowing its wielder with perceived independence, maturity, and masculinity. Readers may recognize the gun as a symbol of Dave's struggle, and subsequent failure, to achieve his aspirations.
