= Perpetual Twilight =

Studio album by Axenstar
- Released: 7 October 2002
- Recorded: 2002
- Genre: Power metal
- Length: 48:40
- Label: Arise Records

Axenstar chronology
Perpetual Twilight (2002)	Far from Heaven (2003)

Professional ratings
Review scores
Source	Rating
Metal Centre	6.5/10
Metal Reviews	75/100
Metal Storm	8/10
Metalfan.nl	72/100
Rock Hard	7.5/10

Perpetual Twilight is the debut studio album by power metal band Axenstar, released on 7 October 2002.

== Track listing ==
1. "All I Could Ever Be" - 4:34
2. "The Cross We Bear" - 5:41
3. "King of Tragedy" - 5:34
4. "Scars" - 5:06
5. "Enchantment" - 4:42
6. "New Revelations" - 7:12
7. "Secrets Revealed" - 3:12
8. "Confess Thy Sins" - 4:08
9. "Perpetual Twilight" - 8:31

== Personnel ==
- Magnus Winterwild - vocals, keyboards
- Thomas Eriksson - guitars
- Peppe Johansson - guitars
- Magnus Ek - bass
- Pontus Jansson - drums
