= Doomed to Fail =

2020 music history book

- Author: J.J. Anselmi
- Genre: Music history
- Publisher: Rare Bird Books
- Publication date: 2020

Doomed to Fail: The Incredibly Loud History of Doom, Sludge, and Post-Metal is a music history book written by former Invisible Oranges contributor J.J. Anselmi detailing the history of doom metal, post-metal and sludge metal. It was published by Rare Bird Books in 2020.

== Background and writing ==
Author J.J. Anselmi stated that he initially had the idea to write a music history book about doom metal, sludge metal and post-metal in 2016. He said he felt the book's existence was justified since there had been books written about styles such as death metal, grindcore and black metal. He said, "There are so many unique people with amazing stories who play doom, sludge, and post-metal, so it only made sense to me to try to put them together and pinpoint both similarities and differences between the styles." He also expressed an appreciation for music history books such as Choosing Death, Lords of Chaos and American Hardcore.

== Critical reception ==
Andrew Rothmund of Invisible Oranges, a publication for which Anselmi previously wrote, praised the book's accessibility and said it was "well-researched [and] well-written". He continued: "Anselmi always had a sharp pen when writing for us, and I had no doubt in my mind that he’d excel at something long-format like an entire goddamn book. Credit is surely owed for the passion and dedication it takes to commit to an entire book, but Anselmi’s writing here flows and feels effortless, allowing for an easy ready that’s informative and definitely not draining or dry."
