= The Final Requiem =

Studio album by Axenstar
- Released: September 12, 2006
- Recorded: April-May 2006
- Studios: Studio Underground, Västerås, Sweden
- Genre: Power metal
- Length: 46:15
- Labels: Massacre Records, King Records (Japan), Locomotive Music (US and Mexico), Sound Pollution (Sweden)

Axenstar chronology
The Inquisition (2005)	The Final Requiem (2006)	Aftermath (2011)

Professional ratings
Review scores
Source	Rating
Metalfan.nl	78/100
Powermetal.de	
Rock Hard	7.5/10
Scream Magazine	4/6
Vampster	

The Final Requiem is the fourth studio album released by power metal band Axenstar. It was recorded April to May 2006 in Studio Underground. This album has been released in Europe on September 8, 2006 and Japan on October 23. It was also released in America and Mexico. Axenstar had changed labels from Arise to Massacre Records in 2005, prior to releasing The Final Requiem. It is their last album with bassist Magnus Ek and drummer Pontus Jansson.

== Track listing ==
1. "The Final Requiem" - 3:53
2. "Condemnation" - 4:03
3. "The Divine" - 4:19
4. "Edge of the World" - 5:19
5. "Thirteen" - 4:41
6. "The Hide" - 4:59
7. "Underworld" - 5:46
8. "Spirit" - 4:07
9. "Pagan Ritual" - 3:56
10. "Seeds of Evil" - 4:37
11. "End of the Line" - 3:59
12. "Beyond the Lies" - 4:48
13. "The Storm" (Japan Bonus Track) - 5:02

== Personnel ==
- Magnus Winterwild - vocals, keyboards
- Joakim Jonsson - guitars
- Magnus Ek - bass guitar
- Pontus Jansson - drums
