= End of All Hope (album) =

Studio album by Axenstar
- Released: 26 April 2019
- Studios: Axenstar Studios; Studio Underground, Västerås, Sweden
- Genre: Power metal
- Length: 51:00
- Label: Ram It Down Records

Axenstar chronology
Where Dreams Are Forgotten (2016)	End of All Hope (2019)	Chapter VIII (2023)

Professional ratings
Review scores
Source	Rating
Metal Temple	9/10
Powermetal.de	7/10
Rock Hard	7.5/10
Metal Hammer Germany	3/7
Heavymetal.dk	3/10

End of All Hope is the seventh studio album released by power metal band Axenstar. It was released on 26 April 2019, via Ram It Down Records. A music video was released for the track "The Unholy".

== Track listing ==
1. "Legions" - 3:50
2. "King of Fools" - 5:41
3. "The Unholy" - 4:02
4. "Honor and Victory" - 4:51
5. "A Moment in Time" - 6:41
6. "My Kingdom Come" - 5:20
7. "The Dark Age" - 4:27
8. "Mistress of Agony" - 5:00
9. "Time Is No Healer" - 4:36
10. "Of Pain and Misery" - 6:32

== Personnel ==
- Magnus Winterwild - vocals, bass, keyboards
- Joakim Jonsson - guitars
- Jens Klovegård - guitars
- Hampus Fasth - drums
