= Where Dreams Are Forgotten =

Studio album by Axenstar
- Released: 28 November 2014
- Studios: Studio Underground, Västerås, Sweden
- Genre: Power metal
- Length: 50:15
- Label: Inner Wound Recordings
- Producers: Axenstar and Pelle Saether

Axenstar chronology
Aftermath (2011)	Where Dreams Are Forgotten (2014)	End of All Hope (2019)

Professional ratings
Review scores
Source	Rating
Eternal Terror	5.5/6
Metal Storm	7.5/10
Metal.de	7/10
Metalfan.nl	66/100
Powermetal.de	7.5/10
Rock Hard	6.5/10
Scream Magazine	4/6

Where Dreams Are Forgotten is the sixth studio album released by power metal band Axenstar. It was recorded at Studio Underground which was previously used for the Aftermath album. The album was released on November 28, 2014, via Inner Wound Recordings.

== Track listing ==
1. "Fear" - 4:27
2. "Inside the Maze" - 4:33
3. "My Sacrifice" - 4:02
4. "Curse of the Tyrant" - 4:21
5. "The Return" - 3:31
6. "Demise" - 4:11
7. "Annihilation" - 5:10
8. "Greed" - 4:26
9. "The Reaper" - 4:44
10. "This False Imagery" - 4:49
11. "Sweet Farewell" - 6:04

== Personnel ==
- Magnus Winterwild - vocals, bass, keyboards
- Joakim Jonsson - guitars
- Jens Klovegård - guitars
- Adam Lindberg - drums
