= Prayer for Cleansing =

American metalcore band

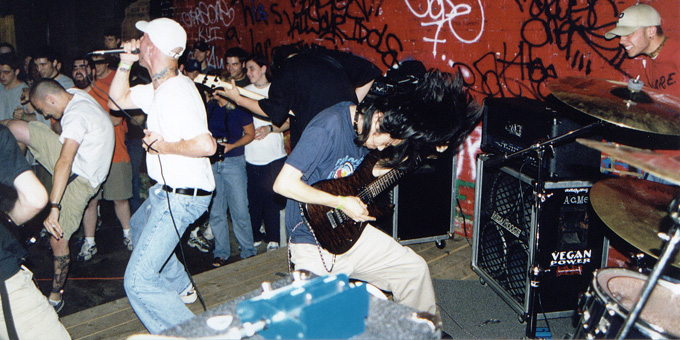

Background information
- Origin: North Carolina, U.S.
- Genres: Metalcore; death metal; black metal
- Years active: 1996–2000, 2001, 2003–2004, 2022–present
- Label: Tribunal
- Spinoffs: Between the Buried and Me
- Members: David Anthem; Paul Waggoner; Will Goodyear; Marc Duncan; Dennis Lamb
- Past members: Tommy Rogers; James Chang

Prayer for Cleansing is an American metalcore band from Raleigh, North Carolina. The band's extreme metal (death/black metal) influences were prominent compared to other metalcore bands at the time. The group was a starting point for three members of Between the Buried and Me (Paul Waggoner, Will Goodyear, and Tommy Giles Rogers).

== Biography ==
The band formed in 1996, consisting of David Anthem (vocals), Paul Waggoner (guitar), Dennis Lamb (guitar), Will Goodyear (drums) and Marc Duncan (bass). They through numerous member changes until 1997. In 1999, they signed to Tribunal Records, releasing their first and most popular album, Rain in Endless Fall. Shortly before the album's release, Lamb left the band and was replaced with James Chang of Undying and, later, Tommy Rogers. In 2000, the band broke up after crashing their touring van. The band performed two reunion shows, the first on March 13, 2004, at the Tremont Music Hall in Charlotte, North Carolina in front of nearly one thousand fans from as far away as Mexico. The second show was at the 2004 Hellfest music festival, in Elizabeth, New Jersey.

Prayer for Cleansing released a re-mixed and re-mastered version of The Rain in Endless Fall on Tribunal Records in 2003, including new artwork. In 2004, Prayer for Cleansing's second album, The Tragedy, was released as a joint label CD/7" by Southern Empire Records, Surprise Attack Records, and War Torn Records. The Tragedy featured three re-recorded songs previously unavailable on an official release (though all three were available in mp3 form), including their cover of The Cranberries song "Salvation". Southern Empire Records was founded in 2004 by David Anthem and ex-Undying bassist and roadie, Jonathan Raine and Chris Gannon. In 2004, straight-edge distributor Seventh Dagger Records released The Rain in Endless Fall on vinyl. The band remains inactive since then.

=== Later projects ===
Tommy Rogers, Paul Waggoner, Marc Duncan, and Will Goodyear went on to play in Raleigh, North Carolina progressive metal band Between the Buried and Me (Duncan left before recording anything and Goodyear left after their first album). Rogers and Waggoner were live members of Undying, playing drums and guitar, respectively. Rogers also sang for Tribunal Records label mates From Here On. Lamb went on to play guitar for Azazel, also a Tribunal Records band (with future Between the Buried and Me members Jason King and Nick Fletcher) and has recorded with Austrian band Der Blutharsch. David Anthem runs a vegan coffee shop in Philadelphia, The Grindcore House.

=== Reunion shows ===
The band announced they would play a one-off benefit show featuring their Rain in Endless Fall lineup on December 18, 2022 in memory of John Rivera and to benefit his family. Another band reforming for the concert is Undying, one of ex-rhythm guitarists James Chang and Tommy Rogers' former bands. The band reissued a remaster of the original mix of their album on vinyl by To Live A Lie Records in late 2022/early 2023. The band played the annual This Is Hardcore festival at the Franklin Music Hall in Philadelphia, Pennsylvania on August 6, 2023.

== Band members ==
=== Current ===
- Will Goodyear – drums, keyboards, additional clean vocals (1997–2000, 2003–2004, 2022–present)
- Paul Waggoner – lead guitar (1997–2000, 2003–2004, 2022–present)
- Dave Anthem – vocals (1997–2000, 2003–2004, 2022–present)
- Dennis Lamb – rhythm guitar (1997–1999, 2022–present)
- Marc Duncan – bass guitar (1997–2000, 2022–present)

=== Former ===
- Tommy Rogers – rhythm guitar (1999–2000, 2003–2004)
- Jimmy Chang – rhythm guitar (1999), bass guitar (2003–2004)

== Discography ==
=== Rain in Endless Fall ===
Rain in Endless Fall

Studio album by Prayer for Cleansing
- Released: June 2, 1999; September 2, 2003 (remastered)
- Recorded: February – May 1999
- Studios: Grooveworks Recording Studios, Torrance, California
- Genres: Metalcore; death metal; black metal
- Length: 37:38
- Label: Tribunal
- Producer: Matthew H. Rudzinski

Professional ratings
Review scores
Source	Rating
AllMusic	2.5/5 stars

==== Track listing ====
No.	Title	Length
1.	"A Dozen Black Roses"	1:32
2.	"Feinbhas a Ghabhail"	4:23
3.	"Winter's Gloom"	1:17
4.	"A Dead Soul Born"	5:19
5.	"Sonnet"	4:35
6.	"Violent Waves"	5:31
7.	"Destiny of Culture"	5:02
8.	"Chalice of Repentance"	3:16
9.	"Bael Na Mblath"	5:17
10.	"Sleep Eternal"	1:26
Total length:		37:38

==== Personnel ====
Prayer for Cleansing

- David Anthem – vocals
- Paul Waggoner – guitars
- Dennis Lamb – guitars
- Mark Duncan – bass
- Will Goodyear – drums, piano, clean vocals on "Feinbhas a Ghabhail"

Additional personnel

- Lenny Watts – backing vocals (tracks 2 and 4)
- Ian Schreier – recording, mixing
- Jamie King – digital editing, mixing (2003 remix/remaster)
- Abbadon Graphicworks – layout and design (CD)
- Jacob Bigham – layout and design (2003 remaster CD)
- Justin Pope – layout and design (Seventh Dagger vinyl)
- Matthew H. Rudzinski – production, mixing (2003 remix/remaster)

=== The Tragedy (EP) ===
The Tragedy

EP by Prayer for Cleansing
- Released: July 2004
- Recorded: April 23 and 24, 2004
- Studios: Basement Studios, Winston-Salem, North Carolina
- Genres: Metalcore; death metal; black metal
- Length: 11:00
- Labels: Surprise Attack; War Torn; Southern Empire
- Producer: Jamie King

==== Track listing ====
No.	Title	Length
1.	"The Closet"	4:11
2.	"When the Sun Kisses the Morning"	3:58
3.	"Salvation" (The Cranberries cover)	2:51
Total length:		11:00

==== Personnel ====
Prayer for Cleansing

- David Anthem – vocals
- Paul Waggoner – guitars
- Thomas Rogers – guitars
- James Chang – bass
- Will Goodyear – drums, clean vocals on "Salvation"

Additional personnel

- Jamie King – recording, mixing
