= Fever Fever (band) =

American music band

- Origin: Grove City, Ohio
- Genres: alternative rock, indie rock, indie folk
- Years active: 2005–present
- Labels: Slospeak
- Members: Drew Murfin; Wes Black; Andrew Bashaw; Zack Taylor
- Website: feverfeverband.com

Fever Fever, is an American alternative music band. They come from Grove City, Ohio. The band started making music in 2005. Their membership is Drew Murfin, Wes Black, Andrew Bashaw, and Zack Taylor. The band released three extended plays while they were independent from a label; Fever Fever in 2008, Kingdom in 2012, and Native Color in 2013. They released an album, LoveQuest independently in 2009. Their first studio album, Aftermath was released by Slospeak Records, in 2014.

== Background ==
Fever Fever is an alternative indie band from Grove City, Ohio. Their current members are lead vocalist and guitarist Drew Murfin, multi-instrumentalist Wes Black, bassist Andrew Bashaw, and drummer and background vocalist Zack Taylor.

== Music history ==
The band commenced as a musical entity in 2005, with their first release Fever Fever, an extended play, that was independently released in 2008. Their second release, an album LoveQuest, was released independently the next year. They released two more extended plays, Kingdom in 2012, and Native Color in 2013. Their first studio album, Aftermath, was released on September 16, 2014, from Slospeak Records. They released two singles from this album to Christian rock radio stations, where Billboard magazine reports "Hypnotized" peaked at No. 7, and their current single "Aftermath" has charted at No. 30.

== Members ==
Current members

- Drew Murfin – lead vocals, guitar
- Wes Black – multi-instrumentalist
- Andrew Bashaw – bass
- Zack Taylor – drums

Past members

- Josh Baker – keyboard, vocals
- Vince Gaietto – bass, vocals
- Sam Smith – drums, vocals

== Discography ==
Studio albums

- Aftermath (September 16, 2014, Slospeak)

Independent albums

- LoveQuest (2009)

Independent EPs

- Fever Fever (2008)
- Kingdom (2012)
- Native Color (2013)

Singles

Year	Single	Chart Positions
Year	Single	US Chr Rock
2015	"Hypnotized"	7
2015	"Aftermath"	30
