= Dystopia (Dystopia album) =

Studio album by Dystopia
- Released: February 2008
- Recorded: 2004–2005
- Studio: Louder Studios (Grass Valley, California)
- Genre: Sludge metal; crust punk
- Length: 32:46
- Label: Life is Abuse
- Producer: Tim Green

Dystopia chronology
The Aftermath (1999)	Dystopia (2008)

Professional ratings
Review scores
Source	Rating
Punknews.org	3/5 stars

Dystopia is the third and final studio album by the American crust punk/sludge metal band Dystopia. It was recorded sporadically between 2004 and 2005, though the album's release wouldn't occur until February 2008 via Life Is Abuse, shortly after the band had already split up.

== Track listing ==
No.	Title	Length
1.	"Now and Forever"	7:44
2.	"Control All Delete"	1:54
3.	"Leaning with Intent to Fall"	5:32
4.	"The Growing Minority"	1:49
5.	"Illusion of Love" (Carcinogen cover)	3:01
6.	"Number One Hypocrite"	4:24
7.	"My Meds Aren't Working"	3:59
8.	Untitled (CD bonus track)	4:23

== Personnel ==
=== Dystopia ===
- Todd Kiessling - bass
- Anthony "Dino" Sommese - vocals, drums
- Matt "Mauz" Parrillo - guitar, vocals, artwork (front cover photo collage), sampler

=== Production and additional staff ===
- Tim Green - recording
- Tardon Featherhead - mastering
- Hans-Jürgen Burkard - photography (cage of men)
- Lord Snowdon - photography (coffin)
- Nicolas Lampert - artwork (bored to death collage)
- Ajana - artwork (bush blood)
- Abhor KUK, Mourn, Vomit BDF - lettering
