= Far from Heaven (album) =

Studio album by Axenstar
- Released: 10 November 2003
- Recorded: May 2003
- Studios: Studio Underground, Västerås, Sweden
- Genre: Power metal
- Length: 46:06
- Label: Arise Records

Axenstar chronology
Perpetual Twilight (2002)	Far from Heaven (2003)	The Inquisition (2005)

Professional ratings
Review scores
Source	Rating
Metal Storm	9.5/10
Metalfan.nl	68/100
Rock Hard	9/10
Scream Magazine	4/6

Far from Heaven is the second studio album by power metal band Axenstar, released on 10 November 2003.

== Track listing ==
1. "The Descending (Intro)" - 1:05
2. "Infernal Angel" - 4:16
3. "Blind Leading the Blind" - 4:41
4. "Don't Hide Your Eyes" - 5:12
5. "Far from Heaven" - 6:56
6. "Abandoned" - 5:19
7. "Children Forlorn" - 4:12
8. "Death Denied" - 4:31
9. "Blackout" - 4:59
10. "Northern Sky" - 4:55

== Personnel ==
- Magnus Winterwild - vocals, keyboards
- Thomas Eriksson - guitars
- Peppe Johansson - guitars
- Magnus Ek - bass
- Pontus Jansson - drums
