= The Inquisition (Axenstar album) =

Studio album by Axenstar
- Released: 6 May 2005
- Recorded: January 2005
- Studios: Studio Underground, Västerås, Sweden
- Genre: Power metal
- Length: 43:03
- Label: Arise Records

Axenstar chronology
Far from Heaven (2003)	The Inquisition (2005)	The Final Requiem (2006)

Professional ratings
Review scores
Source	Rating
Metal Covenant	7.5/10
Metal Storm	8/10
Metal Temple	6/10
Rock Hard	7.5/10
Scream Magazine	4/6

The Inquisition is the third studio album by power metal band Axenstar, released on 6 May 2005.

== Track listing ==
1. "The Fallen One" - 3:53
2. "Under Black Wings" - 5:41
3. "Salvation" - 3:59
4. "Inside Your Mind" - 5:46
5. "Daydreamer" - 4:32
6. "Drifting" - 2:27
7. "The Burning" - 7:16
8. "Run or Hide" - 4:59
9. "The Sands of Time" - 4:30

== Personnel ==
- Magnus Winterwild - vocals, keyboards
- Thomas Eriksson - guitars
- Peppe Johansson - guitars
- Magnus Ek - bass
- Pontus Jansson - drums
