= Aftermath (Axenstar album) =

Studio album by Axenstar
- Released: 7 January 2011
- Studios: Studio Underground, Västerås, Sweden
- Genre: Power metal
- Length: 46:06
- Label: Rock It Up Records / Ice Warrior Records

Axenstar chronology
| The Final Requiem (2006) | Aftermath (2011) | Where Dreams Are Forgotten (2014) |

Professional ratings
Review scores
| Source | Rating |
|---|---|
| Eternal Terror | 5/6 |
| Metalfan.nl | 65/100 |
| Rock Hard | 7.5/10 |

Aftermath is the fifth studio album released by power metal band Axenstar. It was recorded in Studio Underground. This album has been released on 7 January 2011. The album title was revealed on 14 June 2010, and the cover artwork was unveiled on 14 November 2010. A music video was made for the title track, released one day before the album, on 6 January 2011.

== Track listing ==
1. "Dogs of War" - 5:12
2. "The Escape" - 3:47
3. "Tears of the Sun" - 3:21
4. "Agony" - 5:17
5. "Aftermath" - 3:49
6. "The New Breed" - 4:50
7. "Dead Kingdom" - 4:51
8. "Until Your Dying Breath" - 5:06
9. "Signs of a Lie" - 4:27
10. "Forever the Pain" - 5:26
11. "Bad Blood" (Bonus Track) - 4:07

== Personnel ==
- Magnus Winterwild - vocals, bass
- Joakim Jonsson - guitar
- Jens Klovegård - guitar
- Adam Lindberg - drums
