= Dystopia (band) =

American sludge metal/punk band

- Origin: Orange County, California, U.S.
- Genres: Sludge metal, crust punk
- Years active: 1991–2008
- Labels: Life Is Abuse, Tankcrimes, Misanthropic, Common Cause, Pessimiser, Theologian
- Past members: Dino Sommese; Todd Kiessling; Matt Parrillo; Dan Kaufman; Phil Martinez
- Website: lifeisabuse.com

Dystopia was an American crust punk/sludge metal band that formed in Orange County, California in 1991.

== Musical style ==
Dystopia made use of bleak, misanthropic imagery in its presentation. The band's lyrics often dealt with human emotions and social or political issues such as environmentalism, racial equality, substance abuse, and animal rights.

== Previous members ==
- Todd Kiessling – bass (Confrontation, Mange, Agrimony, Kontraklasse, Sour Vein, Screaming Fetus, Sex Powers)
- Matt "Mauz" Parrillo – guitar, vocals, samples (Cantankerous, Mindrot, Medication Time, Nigel Pepper Cock, Drain the Sky, John the Baker and the Malnourished, Kicker, Tension Span)
- Anthony "Dino" Sommese – drums, vocals (Carcinogen, Ghoul, Asunder, Lachrymose, Insidious, Noothgrush, Deadform)
- Dan Kaufman – vocals (1991–1993) (Mindrot, Eyes of Fire, Destroy Judas)
- Phil Martinez – drums (1991) (Phobia, Apocalypse)

== Discography ==
Studio Album

- Human = Garbage 12-inch (1994, Life Is Abuse/Misanthropic Records)
- The Aftermath 12-inch (1999, Life Is Abuse/Misanthropic Records)
- Dystopia CD/LP (2008 Life Is Abuse)

EPs

- Backstabber 7-inch (1997, Life Is Abuse/Misanthropic Records/Common Cause

Live Albums

- Live in the Studio demo tape (1992, self-released)

Splits

- Dystopia/Grief 7-inch (1993 Life Is Abuse/Misanthropic Records)
- Dystopia/Embittered 12-inch (1993 Life Is Abuse/Misanthropic Records)
- Dystopia/Suffering Luna 7-inch (1995 Life Is Abuse/Misanthropic Records)
- Dystopia/Skaven 12-inch (1996 Life Is Abuse/Misanthropic Records)
- Twin Threat to Your Sanity[Bongzilla/Noothgrush/Corrupted/Dystopia] 2-7"(2001 Bad People Records)

Compilation appearances

- "Anger Brought by Disease" on Cry Now Cry Later Vol. 2 2×7″ (1995 Pessimiser Records)
- "Backstabber" (live) on Fiesta Comes Alive LP/CD (1997 Slap-A-Ham Records)
- "Backstabber" on Reality Part Two LP/CD (1997 Deep Six Records)
- "Cosmetic Plague (Rudimentary Peni)" on Whispers 2xLP/CD (1997 Skuld Records)
- "Anger Brought by Disease" on Cry Now Cry Later Vol. 1 & 2 CD (1998 Pessimiser Records)
- "Diary of a Battered Child" on Twin Threat to Your Sanity 2×7″ (2001 Bad People Records/Riotous Assembly Records)
- "Stress Builds Character" on Hymns For The Hearing Impaired CD (1999 Bad People Records)
