= AC×DC =

American hardcore punk band

- Also known as: Antichrist Demoncore
- Origin: Los Angeles, California, U.S.
- Genres: Powerviolence; hardcore punk; bandana thrash
- Years active: 2003–present
- Labels: To Live A Lie, Melotov, Prosthetic
- Members: Sergio Amalfitano; Ryan Corbett; Eddie Oropeza; Jorge Luis Herrera

AC×DC (also known as Antichrist Demoncore) is an American powerviolence band that formed in Los Angeles, California in 2003. The band consists of vocalist Sergio Amalfitano, guitarist Eddie Oropeza and bassist Ryan Corbett and drummer Jorge Luis Herrera. The band's musical style has been mainly labeled as powerviolence and hardcore punk with influences from grindcore, D-beat, crust punk and death metal. The band's aesthetic has been described as "a strange blend of veganism, straight edge and Satanism."

== History ==
The band was formed in 2003 when the members were still in high school. Vocalist Sergio Amalfitano was invited to play in the band by an early guitarist, whom according to Amalfitano planned to form "a Spazz-type band, where the lyrics talk about Ninja Turtles and stuff." The band has generated controversy with some of their recordings, including He Had It Comin' EP (2005), which features a Vietnamese cop shooting a crucified Christ on cover. After entering a hiatus, original members Amalfitano and Jeff Aldape reformed AC×DC with a new line-up in 2010.

The band released its full-length debut album, Antichrist Demoncore in 2014. The album was produced by Taylor Young, who is known for his work for Nails and Twitching Tongues, and mastered by From Ashes Rise and The Cooters member Brad Boatright.

In June 2015, the band announced that it recorded 14 songs for new records and splits.

In 2017 the band took a year long hiatus. ACxDC returned from their hiatus with new guitarist Eddie Oropeza to do some international touring in 2019.

The band announced their release of a sophomore album entitled Satan Is King (an ode to Kanye West's album Jesus Is King) which became available on May 15, 2020 on Prosthetic Records. It features the singles, Satan Is King, and Copsucker.

On March 18, 2024, the band revealed their third album, G.O.A.T., would be released on April 25, and released a single from the album titled "Thot Police".

== Members ==
Current members

- Sergio Amalfitano — vocals
- Eddie Oropeza — guitars
- Ryan Corbett — bass
- Jorge Luis Herrera — drums

Former members

- Aldo Felix — guitars
- José López — guitars
- Pablo Ortiz — guitars
- Jeff Aldape — bass
- J.C. Solis — drums

== Discography ==
Studio albums

- Antichrist Demoncore (2014)
- Satan Is King (2020)
- G.O.A.T. (2024)

EPs

- He Had It Coming (2005)
- The Second Coming (2012)
- Postcard Flexi (2015)
- The Oracles of Death (2016)

Splits

- "Give Up Give In Quit!" - Double 7" Split with No Noise! (2005)
- "10" Split with Magnum Force and Sex Prisoner" (2013)
- "Split 7" with To The Point" (2013)
- "Split 7" with Disparo (2016)
- "Discography" - CD-R Split with Max Ward and Asshole Assassination Squad (release year unknown, given by the band when purchasing a shirt)
- Split with Pig City (2020)

Live albums

- TBFH Live Session (2012)
- Beast Coast Tour Tape 2015 (2015)

Demos

- Jack Trippin Demo (2004)
- Live Noise/Demos/Unreleased (2011)

Compilation albums

- A Sign Of Impending Doom (2005)
- Take Your Cross Off And Join The Crowd (2012)
- Discography 03-13 (2014)
- He Had It Coming/The Second Coming (2014)
