= J. J. Anselmi =

American writer and musician

J.J. Anselmi (born 1985) is an American writer and musician. He is the author of the novel The Dirt in Our Skin, as well as three works of nonfiction: Out Here on Our Own: An Oral History of an American Boomtown; Doomed to Fail: The Incredibly Loud History of Doom, Sludge, and Post-Metal; and Heavy: A Memoir of Wyoming, BMX, Drugs, and Heavy Fucking Music. Anselmi's work has been featured in major publications such as VICE and The A.V. Club. He was hired by Sepultura to write the liner notes for the band's 2017 reissue of the classic album, Chaos A.D.

In addition to his career as an author, Anselmi is an active metal musician.

== Life and career ==
J.J. Anselmi was born in Rock Springs, Wyoming in 1985. After graduating from high school in 2004, he dropped out of college. Two years later, he returned to school and earned his BA in English from the University of Colorado, Denver in 2010, and his MFA in Creative Nonfiction from California State University, Fresno in 2014. Anselmi's music writing has appeared in Revolver, Decibel, VICE, The A.V. Club, CVLT Nation, and Invisible Oranges. In addition to heavy metal, Anselmi is known for writing about the high suicide rate in Wyoming, BMX subculture, tattoo removal, and self-destruction. As a drummer, Anselmi has played in In the Company of Serpents, Former Worlds, and Drainage.

== Bibliography ==
- The Dirt in Our Skin: A Novel (February 2024)
- Out Here on Our Own: An Oral History of an American Boomtown (October 2022)
- Doomed to Fail: The Incredibly Loud History of Doom, Sludge, and Post-Metal (2020)
- Heavy: A Memoir of Wyoming, BMX, Drugs, and Heavy Fucking Music (2016)

== Discography ==
- In the Company of Serpents, Self-titled (2011)

Photos of Eve IX - XVI (2017)

- Drainage, The Younger // Older You (2019)
- Former Worlds, Iterations of Time (2020)
- Glut, Glut (2023)
