= Susan Brison =

American philosopher

Philosophical work
- Institutions: Dartmouth College, New York University, Tufts University, Princeton University
- Main interests: Anti-individualism, mental representation, free speech theory, sexual violence

Susan Brison is Professor of Philosophy and Eunice and Julian Cohen Professor for the Study of Ethics and Human Values at Dartmouth College, where she also teaches in the Program in Women's, Gender, and Sexuality Studies. For the 2016–17 academic year, she was the Laurance S. Rockefeller Visiting Professor for Distinguished Teaching at Princeton University. She has also held visiting appointments at New York University, Tufts University, and Princeton University. Brison's work has succeeded in increasing the amount of attention that philosophy, as a field, pays to issues of rape and domestic violence.

== Education and career ==
Brison graduated from the University of California, Santa Cruz with a bachelor's degree in philosophy, and went on to receive both a master's degree and a PhD from the University of Toronto. She has also previously been a member of the Institute for Advanced Study, an independent postgraduate institution in New Jersey.

== Research areas ==
Brison's work has covered a wide variety of areas including mental representation, free speech theory, sexual violence, and other issues in social, feminist, political, and legal philosophy. Most of her work is tied together by the common theme of anti-individualism. Brison is a politically engaged philosopher, and focuses on connecting her theory work with people's lived experiences, and looks for topics where she can use her analytic philosophic training to advance social justice. Brison also holds a much more limited view of the bounds of free speech than many of her contemporaries do, arguing that free speech can justifiably be limited.

== Publications ==
Brison has written a number of articles in peer-reviewed journals and in anthologies, including pieces in Ethics, Nomos, and Legal Theory.

Brison has written one book, Aftermath, and co-edited a volume, Contemporary Perspectives On Constitutional Interpretation. She is also co-authoring a forthcoming book called Debating Pornography, which talks about internal divisions in feminism that appeared in the 1970s and continue to this day about how best to approach the subject of pornography. Aftermath has been widely lauded, with Mimi Wesson describing Aftermath, writing in The Women's Review of Books, as a "lovely and inspiring volume." Her husband also wrote an account that was published in 2026.

=== Aftermath: Violence and the Remaking of a Self ===
Brison published Aftermath: Violence and the Remaking of a Self with the Princeton University Press in 2002. The book uses the personal lens of her own experience of being violently raped to examine the effects of sexual violence on identity, discussing the initial disintegration of identity that occurs with severe personal trauma and its subsequent reconstruction. While speaking of her lived experience, Brison argues that narratively understanding one's experience of rape can significantly help a survivor recover from harm. Aftermath has been described as Brison's attempt to rejoin two major parts of her life: she is a woman who has been sexually assaulted and also an analytic philosopher.

== Private life ==
Brison's marriage to Thomas Trezise survived her attack, rape and attempted murder. Her husband stayed by her during her recovery and they went on to have a child four years after the attack. With Brison's encouragement her husband wrote "Beginning Again " which was published in October 2026.

=== Anthology chapters ===
- Brison, Susan (2005), "Outliving oneself", in Cudd, Ann E.; Andreasen, Robin O. (eds.), Feminist theory: a philosophical anthology, Oxford, UK Malden, Massachusetts: Blackwell Publishing, pp. 365–376, ISBN 9781405116619.
