= Aftermath (Fever Fever album) =

Studio album by Fever Fever
- Released: September 16, 2014
- Genre: Christian rock, alternative rock, indie rock, indie folk
- Length: 37:45
- Label: Slospeak

Aftermath is the first studio album and a popular album from Fever Fever. Slospeak Records released the album on September 16, 2014.

== Critical reception ==
Professional ratings
Review scores
Source	Rating
Highlight Magazine	4/5 stars
Jesus Freak Hideout	4/5 stars

Awarding the album four stars from Jesus Freak Hideout, Scott Fryberger states, "Fever Fever have truly delivered a fine product for their first label release. Aftermath contains many treasures, and it's an album you may go back to quite often thanks to its superbly-written instrumentation and catchy pop hooks." Roger Gelwicks, rating the album four stars at Jesus Freak Hideout, writes, "Aftermath pays off as one of the finest debuts this year". Giving the album four stars for Highlight Magazine, Geoff Burns describes, "While Aftermath is only the first album from Fever Fever, the band demonstrates what they want to sound like and don’t have a problem in doing so."

== Track listing ==
No.	Title	Length
1.	"Aftermath" (featuring Stephanie Lauren)	3:19
2.	"Blue"	4:20
3.	"Hypnotized"	2:39
4.	"Sea Meets Earth"	3:40
5.	"Windward"	1:57
6.	"Fingertips"	3:31
7.	"Hope Is a Child's Toy"	3:43
8.	"Beautiful Dream"	5:51
9.	"Madness"	3:37
10.	"Line in the Sand"	3:14
11.	"Inceptiones Novae"	1:16
12.	"Collapse"	3:44
Total length:		37:45
