= Suffering Luna =

American hardcore punk band

- Origin: Los Angeles, California, United States
- Genres: Powerviolence, crust punk, sludge metal, post-hardcore, psychedelia, noise
- Years active: 1990–present
- Labels: Pessimiser, Life is Abuse, Misanthropic, Deep Six, To Live a Lie, King of the Monsters Records, Here and Now! Records - Italy
- Members: Messee; Sean Socco; Patrick Palma; Mathias Alderaan Derecha; Dustin Johnson
- Website: www.sufferingluna.com

Suffering Luna is an American hardcore punk band based in Los Angeles, California, United States. They are notable for their early contributions to the punk subgenre known as powerviolence and their split releases with Dystopia and Gasp. The band has existed since the early 1990s. Their music is a blend of crust and powerviolence with neo-psychedelia and noise. The inclusion of noise in their sound has led to comparisons with fellow pioneering powerviolence band Man is the Bastard/Bastard Noise.

== Personnel ==
=== Current lineup ===
- "Messee" – vocals
- Sean Socco (Scalplock, Our Scars are Gifts, Ouroboros is Broken, Cryptids) – guitar, vocals, electronics
- Patrick Palma (Magnolia Thunderpussy, Melic Sub Rosa, Pipsqueak, M.K.Davis, Ouroboros is Broken, Cryptids, Research Inc.) – drums
- Mathias Alderaan Derecha (Spirit of Hate, Cave State, Fractured, PRION) – bass, electronics
- Dustin Johnston (Actuary, To the Point, Fractured, Spirit of Hate) - electronics

=== Former members ===
- Mitch Brown (Gasp) – drums, electronics
- Joe Lara – guitar
- "Taz" – bass, vocals
- Fivel Perez (Runamuck) - bass, vocals
- "Junior" – drums
- Sean Cole (F.Y.P., Toys That Kill) – drums

== Discography ==
=== Albums ===
- Self Titled CD/LP (2011 To Live a Lie Records)

=== EPs ===
- Blood Filled Bong Cassette (2012 To Live a Lie Records)

=== Splits ===
- Suffering Luna/Dystopia 7" (1995 Pessimiser Records, reissued on Life Is Abuse/Misanthropic Records)
- Suffering Luna/Gasp LP (1996 Deep Six Records)
- Suffering Luna/Suffer the Storm LP (2014 King of the Monsters Records)
- Suffering Luna/Column of Heaven LP (2016 Nerve Altar Records)
- Suffering Luna/Chest Pain 7" (2021 Here and Now! Records - Italy)
