= Axenstar =

Swedish metal band

- Also known as: Powerage (1998–2001)
- Origin: Västerås, Sweden
- Genres: Power metal
- Years active: 1998–present
- Labels: Inner Wound, Rock It Up, Massacre, Arise
- Members: Magnus "Winterwild" Eriksson; Joakim Jonsson; Jens Klovegård; Adam Lindberg
- Past members: Henrik Sedell; Thomas Ohlsson; Mr. Eddie; Johan Burman; Magnus Söderman; Thomas Eriksson; Peter "Peppe" Johansson; Magnus Ek; Pontus Jansson
- Website: http://www.axenstar.com

Axenstar is a Swedish power metal band from Västerås, founded in 1998 by Peppe Johansson and Magnus Ek. The band was originally called "Powerage" before changing their name in 2001. They released their first three albums, Perpetual Twilight, Far from Heaven, and The Inquisition, via Arise Records. They have since released five more albums, their latest one being Chapter VIII.

== Band members ==
=== Current ===
- Magnus Winterwild - vocals, keyboards (1999–present), bass (2008–present), rhythm guitar (2005–2008)
- Joakim Jonsson - lead guitar (2005–present, also in Skyfire)
- Jens Klovegård - rhythm guitar (2008–present)
- Pelle Åkerlind - drums (2023-present)

=== Former ===
- Mr. Eddie - vocals (1998–1999)
- Johan Burman - drums (1998–1999)
- Magnus Söderman - lead guitar (1998–1999)
- Thomas Eriksson - lead guitar (1999–2005)
- Peter "Peppe" Johansson - rhythm guitar (1998–2005)
- Magnus Ek - bass (1998–2006)
- Pontus Jansson - drums (1999–2006)
- Thomas Ohlsson - drums (2006–2008)
- Henrik Sedell - bass (2006–2008)
- Adam Lindberg - drums (2008–2018)
- Hampus Fasth - drums (2018–2019)

== Discography ==
=== Studio albums ===
- Perpetual Twilight (2002)
- Far from Heaven (2003)
- The Inquisition (2005)
- The Final Requiem (2006)
- Aftermath (2011)
- Where Dreams Are Forgotten (2014)
- End of All Hope (2019)
- Chapter VIII (2023)

=== EPs/demos ===
- The Beginning (as Powerage) (2000)
- Promo 2001 (2001)
