= Antichrist Demoncore =

Studio album by AC×DC
- Released: June 2014
- Genre: Powerviolence
- Length: 20:05
- Label: Melotov Records
- Producer: Taylor Young

AC×DC chronology
The Second Coming (2012)	Antichrist Demoncore (2014)

Professional ratings
Review scores
Source	Rating
Metal Injection	9/10 stars

Antichrist Demoncore is the first full-length studio album by American powerviolence band AC×DC, released in June 2014 through Melotov Records.

== Track listing ==
1. "Destroy//Create" – 1:04
2. "Misled" – 0:51
3. "Paid in Full" – 1:28
4. "Vegangelical" – 1:11
5. "Holmes" – 0:35
6. "Overstimulated" – 1:17
7. "Cheap Punks" – 0:41
8. "Hipler Youth" – 1:03
9. "Savior Complexxx" – 0:47
10. "Endless Failure" – 1:52
11. "Blood" – 0:54
12. "Dead Cops" – 1:04
13. "Keep Sweet" – 1:08
14. "Lifeless" – 0:36
15. "Filicide" – 1:55
16. "Give Up" – 3:37
