= Assholeparade =

American hardcore band

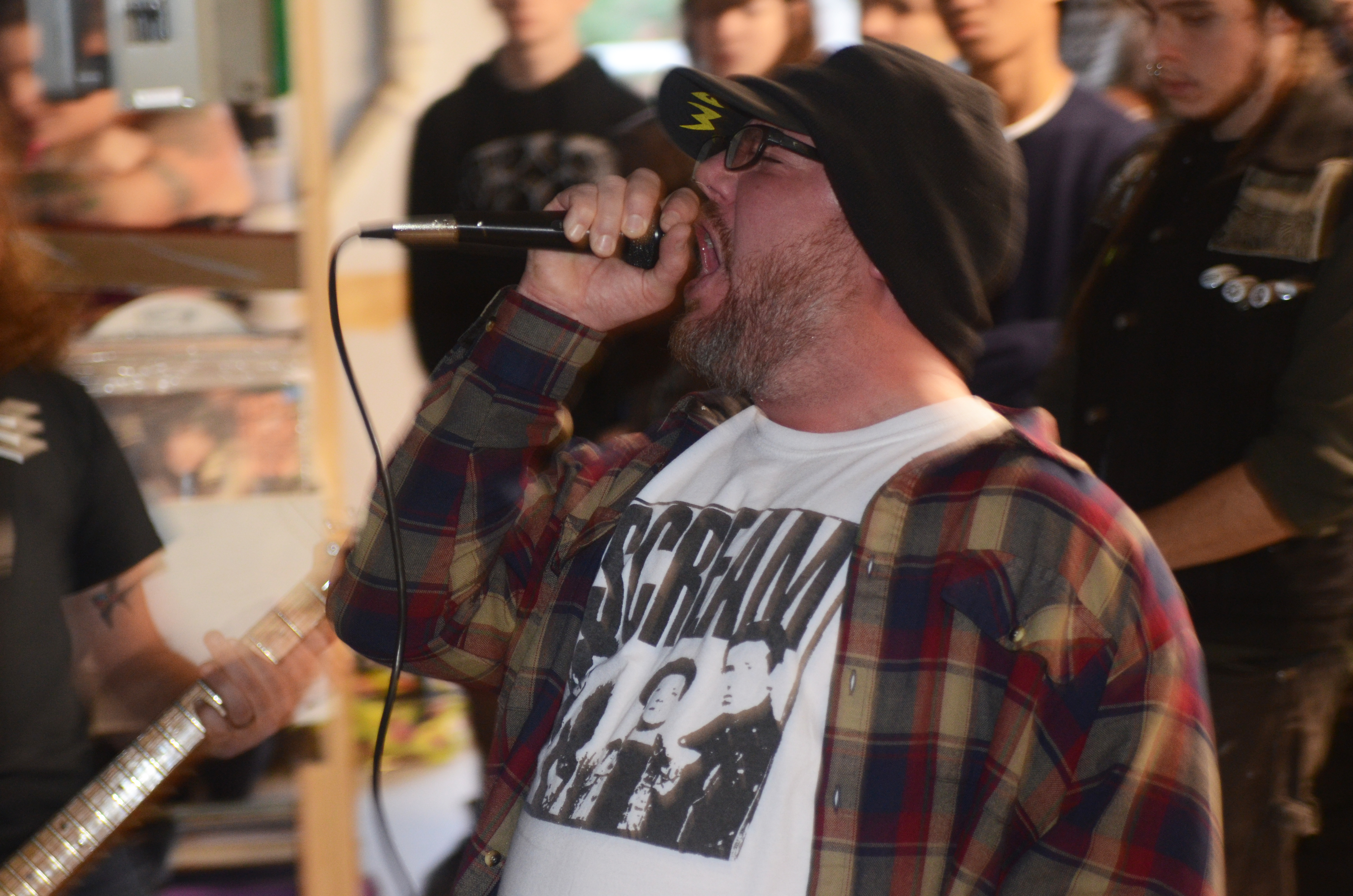
- Live January 12, 2014, in Raleigh, North Carolina

Background information
- Origin: Gainesville, Florida
- Genres: Hardcore
- Years active: 1995–present
- Label: No Idea Records
- Members: Travis Ginn; Jon Weisburg; Matt Sweeting; Travis Johnson; Tony Marquez

Assholeparade is a hardcore band from Gainesville, Florida. They have released two LPs and an EP for No Idea Records, as well as some compilation appearances. They have short aggressive songs. Only two of Assholeparade's original members are left in its current 5-piece setup.

== Members ==
- Travis Ginn (vocals) - 1995–present
- Jon Weisburg (drums) - 1995–present
- Matt Sweeting (Guitar) - 1998–present
- Tony Marquez (Guitar) - 2004–present
- Edward Dimarco (Bass guitar) - 2009–present

== Past members ==
- Brian Johnson (Guitar) - 1995 - 2004
- Chris Campisi (Bass guitar) - 1995 - 1996
- Travis Johnson (Bass) - 1996 - 2002
- Drew DeMiao (Guitar) - 1997 - 1998
- D-Ron (Bass guitar) - 2002–2009
- Edward Dimarco (Bass guitar) - 2009–2024

== Discography ==
- Assholeparade/Ansojuan Split 7-inch (Independent Release, 1996)
- Assholeparade ST 7-inch (Kurt and Jason, 1997)
- Palatka/Assholeparade Split LP (Coalition Records, 1997)
- LHIGHVE 8" EP (Deep Six Records, 1998)
- Student Ghetto Violence LP / CD (No Idea Records, 1999; reissued as tour edition LP on No Idea Records, 2007)
- Say Goodbye 7-inch EP (No Idea Records, 2005)
- Embers LP / CD (No Idea Records, 2006)
- Welcome Fucking Home 7-inch (No Idea Records, 2009)
- Live in Rostock 10-inch (To Live A Lie Records, 2011)
- Assholeparade/Slight Slappers Split LP (No Idea Records, 2011)
- Demo 2020 Cassette (Belladonna, 2020)

== Compilation appearances ==
- Various Artists, Southeast Hardcore, F*ck Yeah!! 7-inch (Kurt and Jason, 1997 )
- Various Artists, Possessed To Skate CD/Vinyl (625 Thrashcore, Pessimer Records, Theologian Records, 1997 )
- Various Artists, No Idea 100: Redefiling Music CD (No Idea Records, 2001)
- Various Artists, Sight And Sound: The History Of The Future video (No Idea Records, 2001)
- Various Artists, A Product Of Six Cents II CD (A Product Of Six Cents, To Live A Lie Records, 2009)
- Various Artists, To Live A Lie Records 2010 Sampler CD (To Live A Lie Records, 2010)
