= Aftermath (Bangladeshi band) =

Bangladeshi alternative rock band

Aftermath আফটারম্যাথ
- Origin: Dhaka, Bangladesh
- Genres: Alternative rock, Grunge
- Years active: 2007–present
- Label: Independent
- Members: Faheem Hossain; Sakib; Navid Iftekhar Chowdhury; Muntasir; Fasihuddin Ahmed Itmam
- Past members: Saikat; Asif; Sondhi; Brenton

Aftermath (Bengali: আফটারম্যাথ) is a Bangladeshi alternative grunge rock band formed in Dhaka, Bangladesh on 23 November 2007. The band released their debut single, "Surjopekkha," in 2008 and released their debut studio album, Jed, in March 2021.

== History ==
In 2007, Aftermath was formed in Dhaka by guitarist Faheem Hossain, drummer Sakib, and bassist Saikat while pursuing their higher secondary education. In 2008, the band released its debut track, "Surjopekkha," followed by "Matir Roud" in 2009. Navid Iftekhar Chowdhury officially joined the band as lead vocalist in 2009. During this early period, the group released another single titled "Moho" but faced lineup instability, as early members Sondhi, Saikat, and Brenton departed due to personal and professional reasons. Consequently, Aftermath operated as a trio consisting of Faheem, Sakib, and Navid for an extended period.

In 2014, Aftermath's lineup stabilized with the addition of bassist Muntasir and guitarist Asif, both previously of the band Distorted. Beginning in 2015, the group established a regular weekly practice routine at a studio named Funkadelic, which the members credited with refining their compositional chemistry and sound. In 2018, Aftermath became one of the co-founding acts of "The Art of Rock," a local concert series launched to promote unfiltered Bangladeshi rock music.

In March 2021. Aftermath released of its debut studio album, Jed. After the album's release, guitarist Fasihuddin Ahmed Itmam, who was also a former member of the band Owned, joined Aftermath's official lineup.

On 26 and 27 August 2022, the band performed at the fourth edition of "The Art of Rock" concert series held at the Liberation War Museum in Dhaka. On 14 July 2023, the band performed at "Dhaka Summer Con," a three-day pop culture festival held at the International Convention City Bashundhara. On 22 July 2023, Aftermath made their international debut at the 5th Moitree Concert held at Rabindra Bhavan in Kolkata, India, following previous visa delays that had postponed their appearance the prior year. In August 2024, Aftermath participated in the "Rishka Aid Concert", a flood relief charity event held at Justice Shahabuddin Ahmed Park in Dhaka, though the event was cut short due to security concerns. On 21 December 2024, the band performed at the Bangladesh Army Stadium for the first time as part of the "Echoes of Revolution" charity concert organized by the "Spirits of July" platform to raise funds for the July Shaheed Smrity Foundation.

== Band Members ==
=== Current members ===
- Faheem Hossain – guitar (2007–present)
- Sakib – drums (2007–present)
- Navid Iftekhar Chowdhury – lead vocals (2009–present)
- Muntasir – bass, backing vocals (2014–present)
- Fasihuddin Ahmed Itmam – guitars, backing vocals (2021–present)

=== Past members ===
- Saikat – bass (2007–2010)
- Asif – guitar (2014–2021)
- Sondhi
- Brenton

== Discography ==
=== Studio albums ===
- Jed (2020)

=== Singles ===
- Surjopekkha
- Moho
- Biplobir
