= Aftermath (Burton novel) =

1997 novel by LeVar Burton

Aftermath is a 1997 novel written by LeVar Burton.

== Plot summary ==
Aftermath is a novel in which the story begins with the assassination of America's first Black president, coinciding with a devastating earthquake in the nation's heartland. Chaos and conflict follow in its wake.

== Reception ==
Aftermath was reviewed in Arcane magazine, which stated that "Strife ensues, but good will have its day. Have you ever read The Stand?"

== Reviews ==
- Review by Graham Andrews (1998) in Vector 199
