= Harald Jähner =

German journalist and author

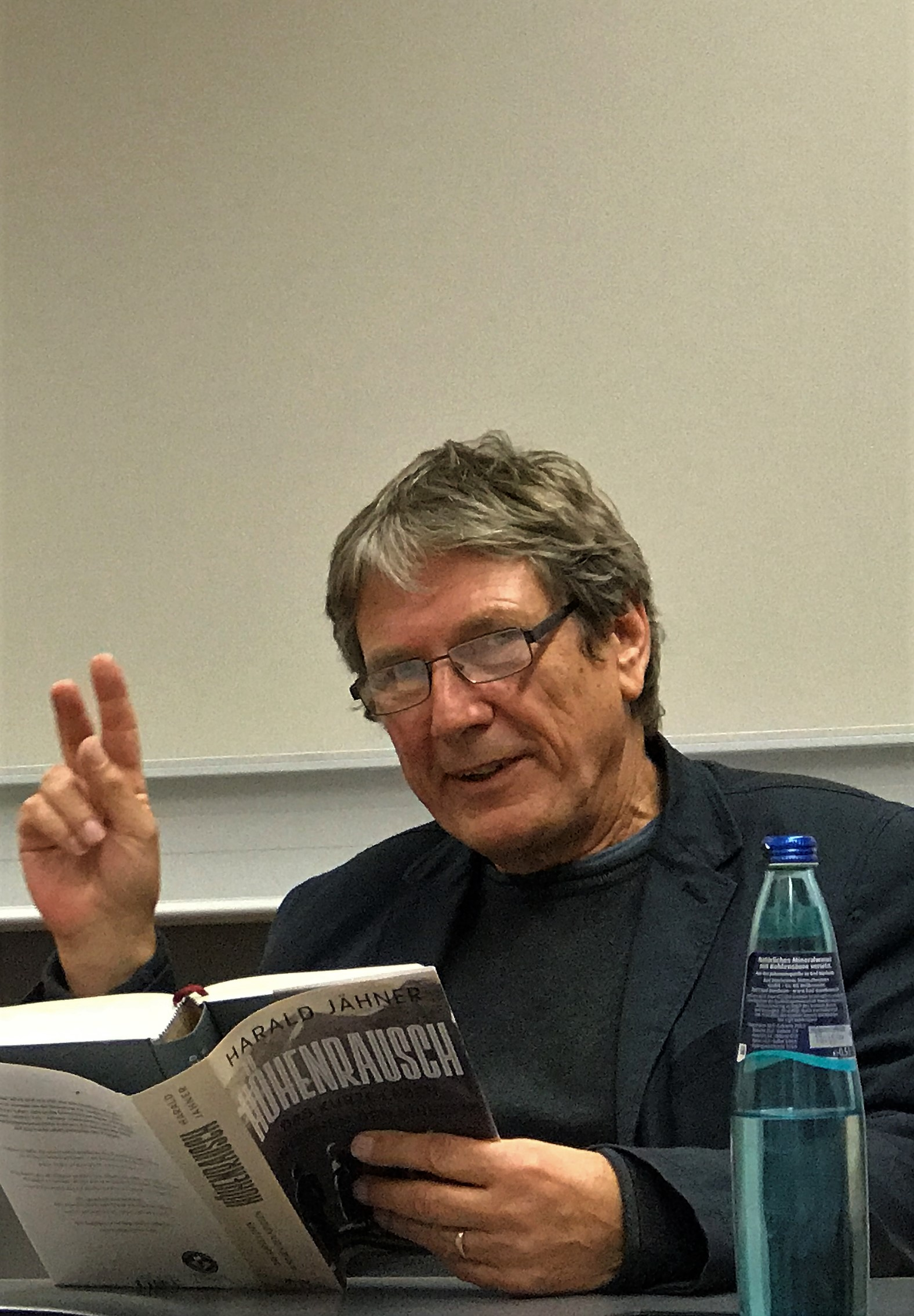
- Harald Jähner in Freiburg (2022)
- Born: 26 March 1953 (age 73); Duisburg, Germany
- Occupation: Professor of cultural journalism at the Berlin University of the Arts
- Years active: 2011–present

Harald Jähner (born March 26, 1953) is a German journalist and author. Since 2011 he has been an honorary professor of cultural journalism at the Berlin University of the Arts.

== Biography ==
Jähner studied literature, history and art history in Freiburg and completed his doctorate in Berlin. After graduation, he worked as a freelance journalist. For several years Jähner was head of the communication department of the House of World Cultures in Berlin. At the same time from 1994 to 1997 he wrote as a freelance literary critic for the Frankfurter Allgemeine Zeitung. He then worked as an editor at the Berliner Zeitung, where he headed the Feuilleton department from 2003 to 2015. Since 2011, Jähner has been honorary professor of cultural journalism at Berlin University of the Arts. In 2019, Jähner published Wolfszeit, a consideration of German life in the post-war decade 1945–1955, published by Rowohlt Berlin.

== Awards ==
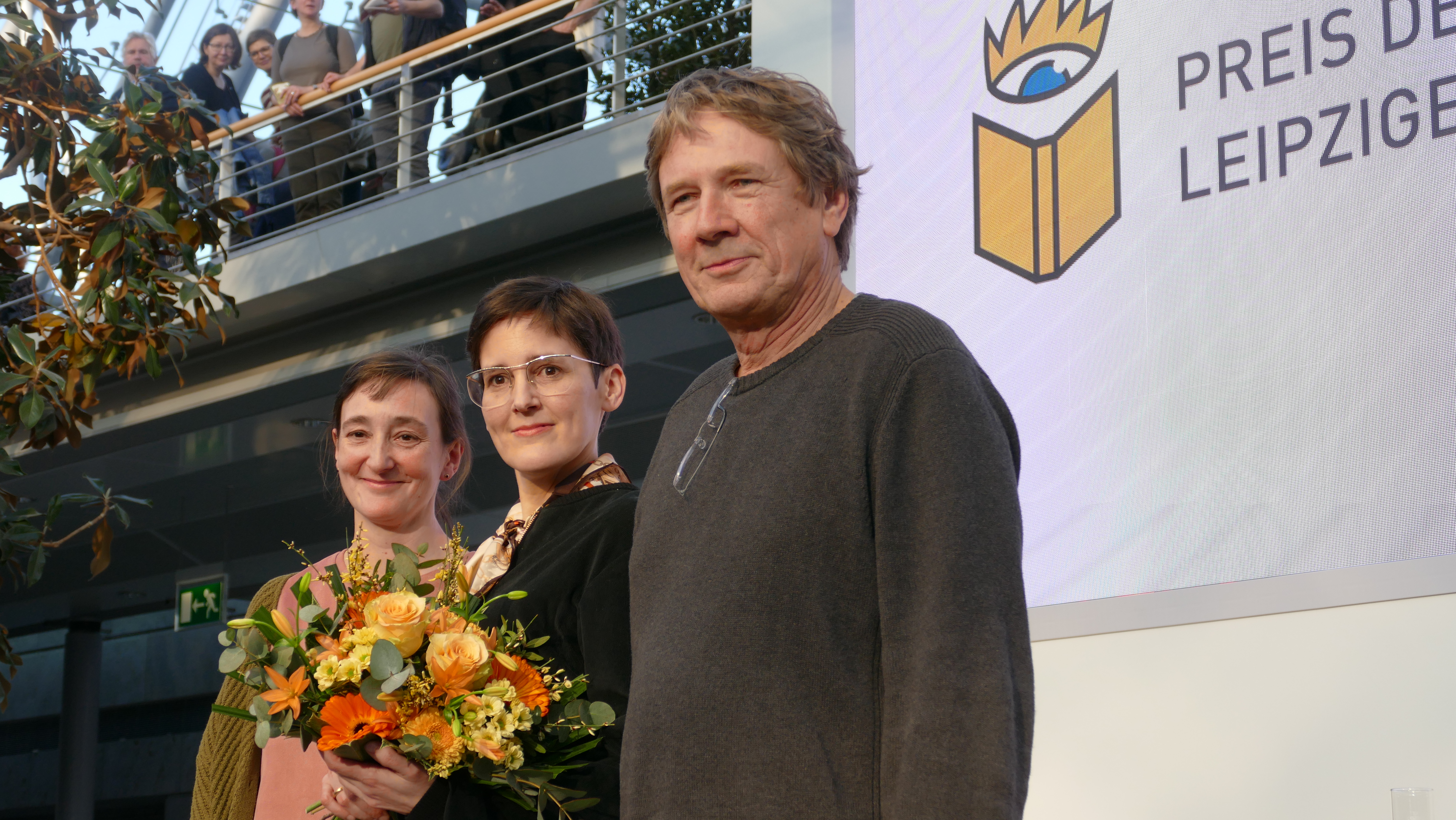
Prize of the Leipzig Book Fair 2019 – The winners from left: Eva Ruth Wenne (translation), Anke Stelling (fiction) and Harald Jähner (non-fiction book)

In 2019, Jähner won the Leipzig Book Fair Prize for Wolfszeit (Category: Non-fiction book / Essay writing)

== Bibliography ==
- Wolfszeit, Rowohlt Berlin, Berlin 2019, ISBN 978-3-7371-0013-7. English title Aftermath.
- Aftermath: Life in the Fallout of the Third Reich, 1945–1955 - Translated from German by Shaun Whiteside.
- Erzählter, montierter, soufflierter Text. Zur Konstruktion des Romans "Berlin Alexanderplatz" von Alfred Döblin, Verlag Peter Lang, Frankfurt am Main 1984, ISBN 978-3-8204-5276-1.
- Herausgegeben gemeinsam mit Krista Tebbe: Alfred Döblin zum Beispiel. Stadt und Literatur., Elefanten Press, Berlin 1987, ISBN 978-3-8852-0238-7.
- Vertigo: The Rise and Fall of Weimar Germany, WH Allen, London 2022, ISBN 9780753559963.
