= The Aftermath (Russian duo) =

Ingush singer-songwriter duo

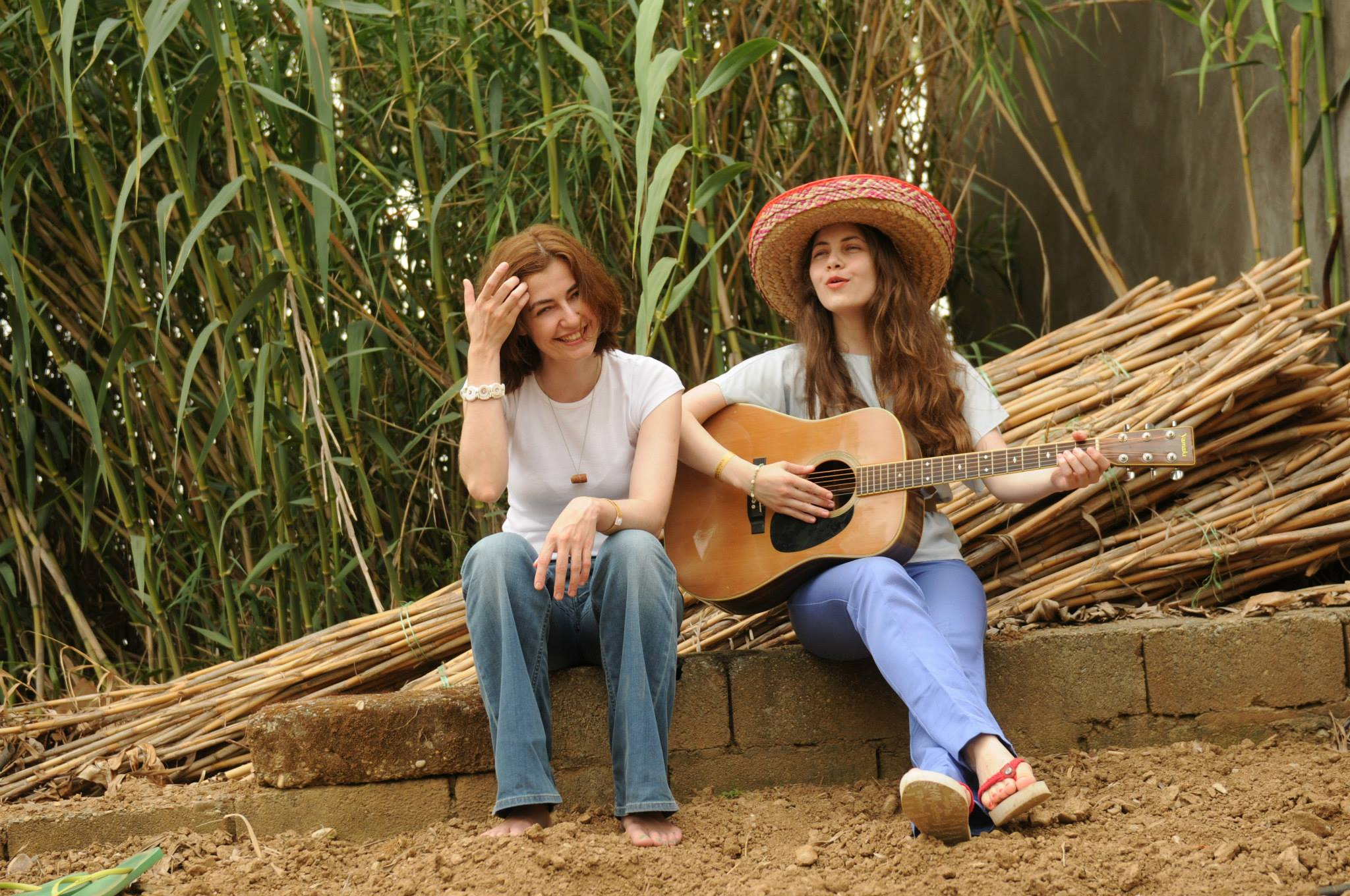

Background information
- Origin: Ingushetia, Russia
- Genres: Blues, folk, rhythm & blues, jazz, rock
- Years active: 2004–present
- Members: Fatima Matieva; Taita Matieva

The Aftermath is an Ingush singer-songwriter duo formed in 2004 by sisters Fatima Matieva and Taita Matieva, based in Moscow, Russia. They were born and grew up in Grozny, Chechen Republic.

In 2006 the 1st album, I Follow Song, consisting of 14 songs of the sisters, was released in Russia.

In 2012 the 2nd album, Charming October, came out as an insert and with the duo's interview in the music magazine Stereo&Video. All 12 songs in the album are written and composed by the sisters. The release received many acknowledgements and reviews around Russia.

On 21 November 2018 the 3rd album, The Fugitive Kind, was released by Butman Music Records. The world-famous jazz musicians Igor Butman and Arkady Shilkloper participated in the recording of the album. All 13 songs in the album are again fully original written by Fatima and Taita.

The sisters' music is highly acclaimed by the music critic Artemy Troitsky.

== Members ==
- Fatima Matieva – vocals, keyboards, words and music
- Taita Matieva – vocals, guitar, words and music

== Discography ==
=== Albums ===
- 2018: The Fugitive Kind
- 2012: Charming October
- 2006: I Follow Song

=== Singles ===
- 2011: "Santa Claus"
