= Grief (band) =

American sludge metal band

- Origin: Boston, Massachusetts, U.S.
- Genres: Sludge metal; doom metal
- Years active: 1991–2001; 2005–2006; 2008–2009
- Labels: Grievance; Century Media; Southern Lord; Pessimiser; Theologian; HG Fact
- Spinoff of: Disrupt
- Members: Jeff Hayward; Eric C. Harrison; John Heidenrich; Ray McCaffrey
- Past members: Pete Donovan; Terry Savastano; Rick Johnson; Randy Odierno; Steve Nelson; Chuck Conlon

Grief was an American sludge metal band based in Boston, Massachusetts.

== History ==
Grief was founded in 1991 by Disrupt guitarist Terry Savastano and Unleashed Anger drummer Pete Donovan. Randy Odierno (who later switched to bass and eventually left to join Bane of Existence) and Jeff Hayward joined shortly thereafter. They disbanded in 2001 mainly due to drummer problems - something that was an ongoing problem for the band from the start. They also cited what they called a "hostile environment for doom metal bands". They reunited briefly in July 2005 to play a cluster of reunion shows.

The band had several 7"s including one with Dystopia and Corrupted each. A compilation album called Turbulent Times appeared in 2002 through Southern Lord. The group reunited for one show at the first annual New England Grind And Doom Fest on July 17, 2005 at The Middle East Cafe in Cambridge, MA. They were so excited by the response to this show that they began booking others, and they toured intermittently throughout 2005 and 2006.

In 2005, the band played shows through in venues including The Ace of Clubs and The Knitting Factory in New York, The Khyber in Philadelphia, O'Brien's in Allston/Brighton, MA, The Living Room in Providence, RI, and Cherry St. Station in CT.

In 2006, Southern Lord Records released a full-length live album called Alive which featured their performance at the Middle East in November 2005.

Grief's final appearance was at Emissions from the Monolith 8, a sludge/doom festival that took place in Ohio, May 2006.

The Hartford Advocate wrote the following about their December 3, 2005 date at Cherry St. Station in CT:

Since 1991, these Massholes have been writing songs about a distinctly New England flavor of depression and isolation. Jeff Hayward's throat-shredding vocals often seem more hardcore than metal; indeed, almost 15 years later, it's possible to see Grief as one of a handful of seminal NE bands who initiated the merger between hardcore and metal. However, unlike some of those bands, Grief still sounds both relevant and entertaining.

The band re-formed in 2008 and toured the United States and Europe, but they soon disbanded again in March 2009.

In 2012, Savastano formed the idea of reuniting Grief as Come to Grief, after the seminal 1994 album. Their name was changed in 2014 and followed by a headlining appearance in Oakland, California's Deadfest 2015.

Members of the band have gone on to play in many other bands since the dissolution of Grief including Consume, Deathraid, Disrupt, State of Fear, Unleashed Anger, Goff, Demonic Death Preachers, Effects of Alcohol, Noosebomb, Abhorred, Z28, and Chicken Chest and the Bird Boys, Dread, and Oxblood Forge.

== Members ==
=== Final lineup ===
- Jeff Hayward – vocals, guitar (1991–2001, 2005–2009)
- John Heidenrich – guitar, vocals (2005–2009)
- Eric C. Harrison – bass, vocals, artwork (1996–2001, 2005–2009)
- Ray McCaffrey – drums, percussion (2005–2009)

=== Former members ===
- Randy Odierno – bass (1991–1996), drums (1996–1998)
- Jay Stiles – guitar (1991–1993)
- Terry Savastano – guitar (1991–2000, 2005)
- Pete Donovan – drums (1991–1993)
- Rick Johnson – drums (1993–1996, 2000)
- Steve Nelson – guitar (1994–1995)
- Chuck Conlon – drums (1998–2000)

== Discography ==
=== Studio albums ===
Year	Title	Type	Label
1992	Depression	EP	Grievance Records
1993	Dismal	Studio album	Common Cause
1994	Come to Grief	Studio album	Vacuum Records / Century Media
1996	Miserably Ever After	Studio album	Theologian Records
1998	Torso	Studio album	Pessimiser Records
2000	... And Man Will Become the Hunted	Studio album	Pessimiser Records

=== Split singles ===
Year	Title	Split with	Label
1993	"Lifeless"	Dystopia	Life Is Abuse/Misanthropic
1993	"Falling Apart"	13	Grievance Records
1994	"Pessimiser"	16	Theologian/Pessimiser
1995	"My Dilemma"	Corrupted	HG Fact
1995	"Green Vegetable Matter"	Soilent Green	Pessimiser Records
1998	"Bored"	16	Theologian/Pessimiser

=== Compilation and live albums ===
- 2002: Turbulent Times (Southern Lord Records)
- 2006: Alive (Southern Lord Records)
- 2008: Euro Tour (Alerta Antifascista)
