= Sludge metal =

Genre of heavy metal music

- Other names: Sludge; sludge doom
- Stylistic origins: Hardcore punk; doom metal
- Cultural origins: Mid-1980s, California, Washington and Louisiana
- Derivative forms: Post-metal

Subgenres
- Sludgecore

Regional scenes
- Georgia; Louisiana

Local scenes
- New Orleans; Seattle

Other topics
- Beatdown hardcore; crust punk; groove metal; Southern rock; stoner rock

Sludge metal (also known as sludge doom or simply sludge) is an extreme subgenre of heavy metal music that combines elements of doom metal and hardcore punk. The genre generally includes slow tempos, down-tuned guitars and nihilistic lyrics discussing poverty, drug addiction and pollution.

The sound of sludge metal has its origins in California hardcore punk bands in the early-to-mid-1980s like Black Flag, Flipper and Fang, who began slowing their tempos and embracing the influence of Black Sabbath. This sound was expanded upon by the Melvins towards the end of the decade and the bands they influenced in both the Seattle grunge scene, and in Louisiana with Eyehategod, Crowbar and Acid Bath. In the 1990s and 2000s, the sound of sludge diversified: bands including Neurosis, Isis and Cult of Luna helped to pioneer post-metal, while Baroness and Mastodon fused the genre with progressive metal, while Dystopia did so with crust punk and Grief with anarcho-punk.

== Characteristics ==
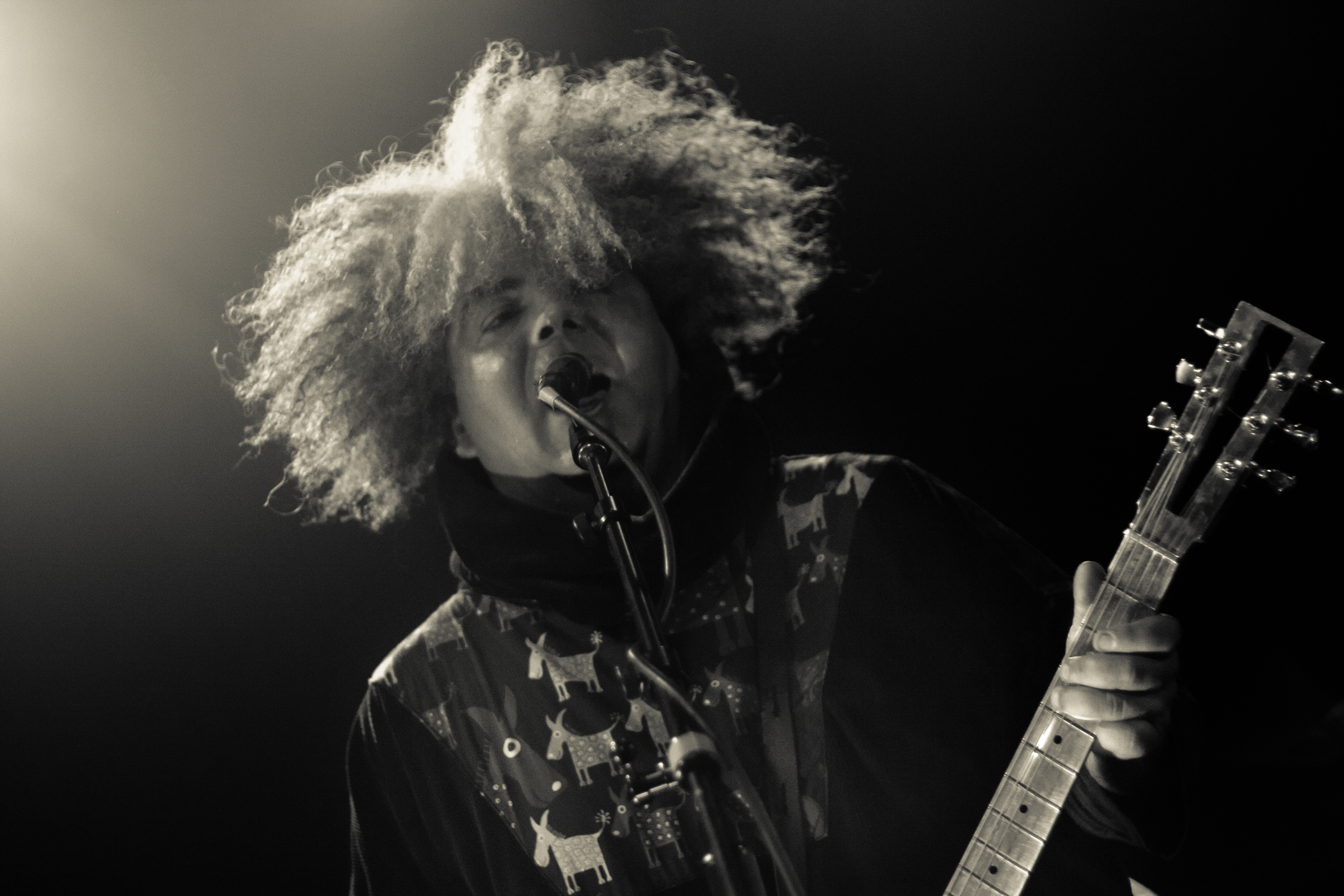
The Melvins were one of the earliest and most influential sludge metal bands.

Alex Deller of Metal Hammer describes sludge metal as a "mutant cousin to both doom and stoner metal", incorporating the "misery of the former and the prodigious narcotic consumption of the latter while spewing nihilism, self loathing and frenzied punk rock aggression into the vomitous mix." He also described the style as "arguably the biggest, ugliest mutt" of the extreme metal subgenres.

The key characteristics of sludge metal are a slow tempo combined with down-tuned, heavily distorted guitars. However, some bands do make use of tempo changes into faster sections. The key element that differentiates sludge from other doom metal derived styles is its influence from hardcore punk, particularly the genre's use of high aggression and screamed vocals, though the genre can include sung vocals. Many sludge bands also make use of elements of industrial music, southern rock and blues. Bandcamp Daily writer Noah Berlatsky described the genre as "visceral and ugly".

Sludge metal's lyrics explore real-world themes, while often also making light of the darkness of these topics. Drug addiction is a common theme, while discussion of poverty and pollution are also prevalent.

Sludge bands who lean more towards hardcore are sometimes called sludgecore by music historians including Garry Sharpe-Young and David Pearson. New Orleans is the birthplace of the sludgecore movement, with Eyehategod being this style's frontrunner. More recently, sludgecore bands like the Abominable Iron Sloth, Admiral Angry and Black Sheep Wall have emerged.

== History ==
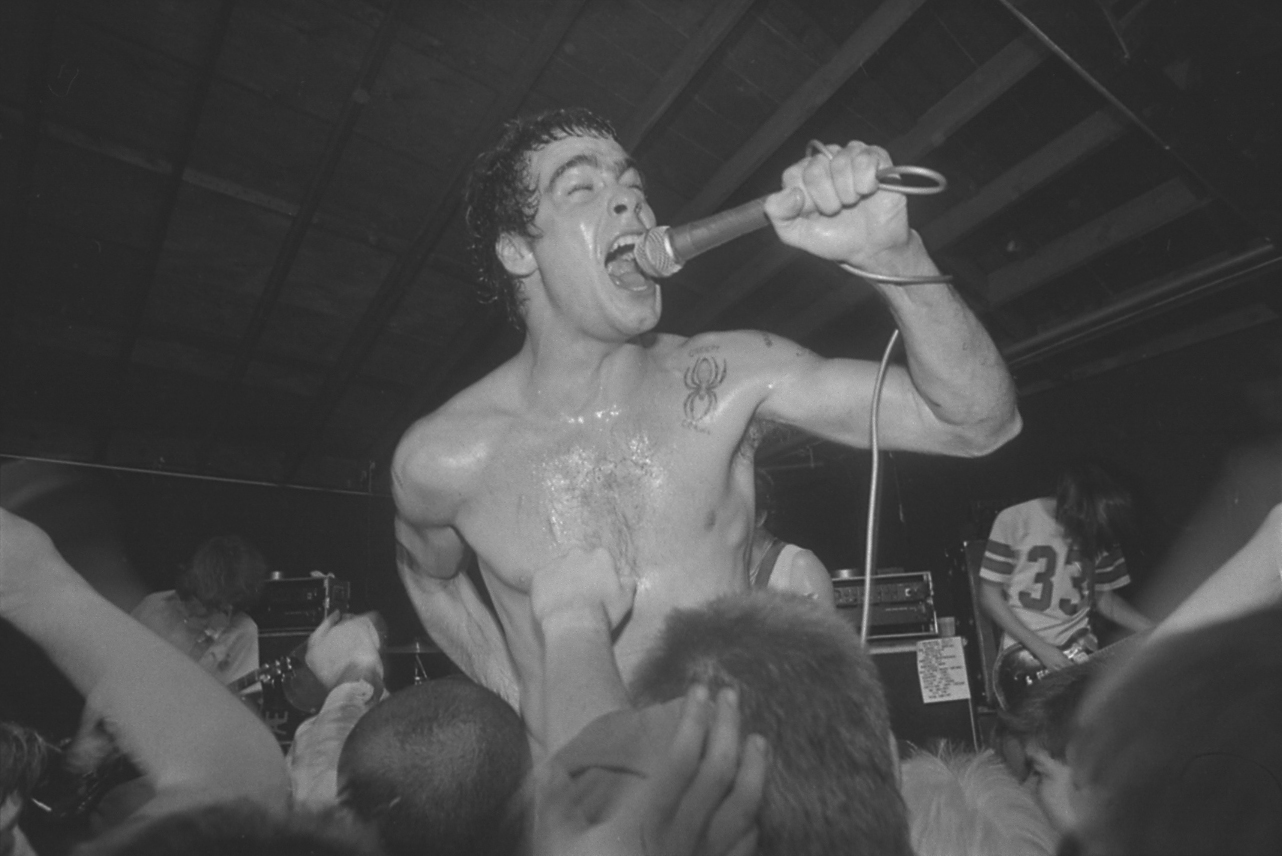
The B-side of Black Flag's My War (1984) featured some of the earliest sludge metal tracks.

Since its inception in the late 1970s, the sound of hardcore punk was primarily defined by its high tempos. However, by the early-to-mid-1980s, a crop of bands, particularly California groups Black Flag, Fang and Flipper, began to play slower tempos as a way of antagonizing many in the scene. As early as 1982, Flipper's Album – Generic Flipper made use of dirgey, low tempos and expansive song lengths in the case of "(I Saw You) Shine", to create what, in his book Monolithic Undertow In Search of Sonic Oblivion, writer Harry Sword credited as the "genesis of sludge metal". Furthermore, Los Angeles band Saint Vitus, one of the forefront groups in the still emerging doom metal genre, released their self-titled debut album through SST Records in 1984. The album's title track, merged the band's usual doom metal style with elements of punk to create a mid-tempo hardcore track which writer J. J. Anselmi described as "the first sludge metal song on record". However, it was the three track B-side of Black Flag's My War (1984) and its embrace of Black Sabbath influence, that is generally accredited as beginning the sludge metal genre.

Early on My War's influence took a particular hold on Seattle, Washington's burgeoning grunge scene, inspiring some of the scene's earliest bands like 10 Minute Warning and the U-Men. The Melvins, formed in Montesano, Washington in 1983, were one of the most prominent bands in the scene to embrace the influence of both My War and Album – Generic Flipper, and would go on to be described by publications such as Revolver as the band that "invented sludge". Beginning their career by playing hardcore, the band began playing "slow and heavy riffs" after seeing Black Flag in Seattle in 1984, to form a dirge-like music that inspired much of the subsequent sludge and grunge bands. The grunge scene became sludge's most commercially successful moment, with groups like Soundgarden and Nirvana achieving widespread mainstream success in the early 1990s, playing music that merged the genre with alternative rock.

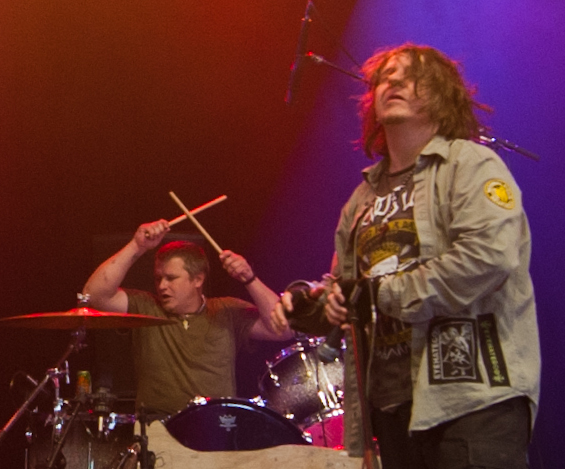
Eyehategod are one of the defining bands in the New Orleans sludge metal scene.

By the 1990s, Louisiana developed one of the largest and most influential sludge metal scenes, with bands like Acid Bath, Crowbar and Eyehategod. Eyehategod were one of the first sludge bands to form in the state at a time when the majority of local bands were fast. The band purposefully rebelled against this, embracing the influence of Black Sabbath and Black Flag, as a means to antagonize their peers. In the following years, Eyehategod became one of the defining and most influential bands in the genre: their second album Take as Needed for Pain (1993), inspired a multitude of bands to form or change sounds; and Eyehategod's members would go on to be a part of other defining New Orleans sludge bands including Soilent Green, Crowbar and Down. In a 2009 interview with Decibel magazine, Down vocalist Phil Anselmo stated "Back in those days, everything in the underground was fast, fast, fast. It was the rule of the day...But when the Melvins came out with their first record, Gluey Porch Treatments, it really broke the mold, especially in New Orleans. People began to appreciate playing slower."

The 924 Gilman Street punk scene in Berkeley, California produced a sizeable sludge metal scene in the late 1980s and into the 1990s, which included Neurosis and Noothgrush. Neurosis' transition from playing hardcore to a droning, ambient and progressive style of sludge metal helped pioneer the post-metal genre, then joined by Boston's Isis and Umeå's Cult of Luna in the following years. Around the same time, Orange County, California's Dystopia released their debut album Human = Garbage which merged sludge metal with influences from crust punk and grindcore, while Boston's Grief did the same with anarcho-punk. In the United Kingdom, both Fudge Tunnel and Iron Monkey were prominent bands in the 1990s who embraced the influence of the Melvins and nascent sound of sludge.

Damad formed in 1991 in Savannah, Georgia, releasing two studio albums Rise and Fall (1997) and Burning Cold (2000) which showcased both sludge and grindcore influenced punk. Damad's influence led to Savannah developing a significant sludge metal scene in the 2000s which included Baroness, Black Tusk and Kylesa. Bands in the scenes' equal parts influence from punk, metal and rock led to writers like J.J. Anselmi referencing a "Savannah sound". Baroness' progressive take on the style, which also incorporated elements alternative rock gained significant commercial success in the 2010s. Mastodon from Atlanta similarly merged the genre with progressive elements. The band's first two albums Remission (2002) and Leviathan (2004) were cited by Kerrang! as two of the most important sludge metal albums of all time, however as the band progressed, they became increasingly indebted to progressive metal and less to sludge.

== See also ==
- List of sludge metal bands
- Crust punk
- Doomed to Fail, a music history book about sludge metal and similar styles

== Publications ==
- Bukszpan, Daniel (2012). The Encyclopedia of Heavy Metal. Sterling, New York. ISBN 978-1402792304.
