= Pig Destroyer discography =

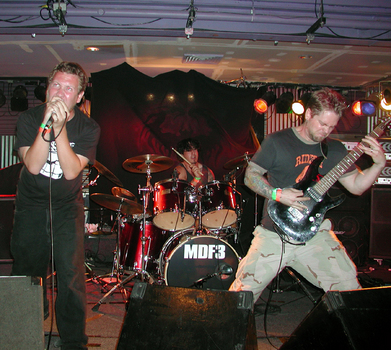
- Pig Destroyer at Maryland Deathfest in 2005.
- Studio albums: 6
- EPs: 4
- Compilation albums: 2
- Singles: 2
- Splits: 5

The discography of Pig Destroyer, an American grindcore band. The discography consists of six studio albums, two compilation albums, five extended plays (EPs), and five split albums.

== Albums ==
=== Studio albums ===
| Year | Album details |
|---|---|
| 1998 | Explosions in Ward 6: Released: May 15, 1998; Label: Clean Plate Records, Reservoir |
| 2001 | Prowler in the Yard: Released: July 24, 2001; Label: Relapse |
| 2004 | Terrifyer: Released: October 12, 2004; Label: Relapse |
| 2007 | Phantom Limb: Released: June 12, 2007; Label: Relapse |
| 2012 | Book Burner: Released: October 22, 2012; Label: Relapse |
| 2018 | Head Cage: Released: September 7, 2018; Label: Relapse |

=== Live albums ===
| Year | Album details |
|---|---|
| 2021 | Pornographers of Sound: Live in NYC: Released: June 11, 2021; Label: Relapse |

=== Compilation albums ===
| Year | Album details |
|---|---|
| 2000 | 38 Counts of Battery: Released: November 28, 2000; Label: Relapse |
| 2004 | Painter of Dead Girls: Released: January 27, 2004; Label: Robotic Empire |

=== Extended Plays ===
| Year | Album details |
|---|---|
| 1997 | Demo: Released: 1997; Label: Self-Release |
| 2000 | 7" Picture Disc: Released: Early 2000; Label: Reptillian |
| 2008 | Natasha: Released: November 11, 2008; Label: Relapse |
| 2012 | Blind, Deaf, and Bleeding: Released: 2012; Label: Relapse |
| 2013 | 7" Flexi Disc: Released: January 19, 2013; Label: Decibel Flexi Series |
| 2013 | Mass & Volume: Released: March 5, 2013; Label: Relapse |
| 2020 | The Octagonal Stairway: Released: August 28, 2020; Label: Relapse |

=== Split albums ===
| Year | Album details |
|---|---|
| 1997 | Orchid / Pig Destroyer: Released: November, 1997; Label: Amendment; Split with: Orchid |
| 1999 | Pig Destroyer / Gnob: Released: October, 1999; Label: Robotic Empire; Split with: Gnob |
| 2000 | Isis / Pig Destroyer: Released: July, 2000; Label: Relapse; Split with: Isis |
| 2002 | Benümb / Pig Destroyer: Released: February 19, 2002; Label: Robotic Empire; Split with: Benümb |
| 2007 | Pig Destroyer / Coldworker / Antigama: Released: May, 2007; Label: Relapse; Split with: Coldworker and Antigama |

== Songs ==
=== Singles ===
| Year | Album details |
|---|---|
| 2013 | "The Octagonal Stairway": Released: September 3, 2013; Label: Williams Street Records |
| 2019 | "The Cavalry": Released: March 1, 2019; Label: Decibel Flexi Series |
| 2019 | "Cameraman": Released: March 20, 2019; Label: Williams Street Records |

== Guest appearances ==
List of non-single guest appearances, showing year released and album name
| Year | Song | Album |
|---|---|---|
| 2000 | Delusional Supremacy | Contaminated 3.0 |
| 2003 | "Mapplethorpe Grey" | Contaminated 5.0 |
| 2004 | "Terrifyer" | Contaminated, Vol. 6 |
| 2004 | "Blonde Prostitute" | BMA vs Metal Blade vs Robotic Empire: Sampler 2004 |
| 2005 | "Gravedancer" | Contaminated: Relapse Records Sampler, Vol. 7 |
| 2005 | "Gravedancer" | Relapse Records Extreme Music Sampler |
| 2005 | "Claude" | We Reach: The Music of the Melvins |
| 2008 | "Scarlet Hourglass" & "Cheerleader Corpses" | Grind Your Mind – A History of Grindcore |

== Videos ==
=== Music videos ===
| Year | Song | Director | Album |
|---|---|---|---|
| 2001 | Piss Angel | Kenneth Thibault & Nathaniel Baruch | Prowler In The Yard |
| 2004 | "Gravedancer" | Vladimir Lik | Terrifyer |
| 2007 | "Loathsome" | Dave Brodsky | Phantom Limb |
| 2012 | "The Diplomat" | Phil Mucci | Book Burner |
| 2018 | "Army of Cops" | Dave Brodsky | Head Cage |
| 2018 | "The Torture Fields" | Frank Huang | Head Cage |
| 2018 | "Mt. Skull" | Joe Stakun | Head Cage |
| 2020 | "The Cavalry" | Frank Huang | The Octagonal Stairway |
