= Book Burner =

Studio album by Pig Destroyer
- Released: October 22, 2012
- Recorded: Visceral Sound Studios
- Genre: Grindcore
- Length: 31:42
- Label: Relapse
- Producer: Scott Hull

Pig Destroyer chronology
Natasha (2008)	Book Burner (2012)	Mass & Volume (2013)

Book Burner is the fifth studio album by American grindcore band Pig Destroyer. It was released on October 22, 2012, through Relapse Records. The deluxe edition includes a short story by J.R. Hayes entitled "The Atheist" and an EP of hardcore punk covers. Vocalist J.R. Hayes stated that the band's only goal for Book Burner was "fast/brutal" and expressed happiness over the abundance of songs on the album with shorter lengths. Guitarist Scott Hull also affirmed that the band's goal was "shorter grind" on Book Burner in contrast with the preceding full-length album, Phantom Limb.

== Background ==
There was a five-year gap between Book Burner and its predecessor, Phantom Limb. Guitarist Scott Hull explained that "there was a lot of adversity that we had to go through to get this record done", which explained the delay: "A lot of changing, of breaking down and rebuilding the equipment and the places that we used and the people we worked with, the approach that we follow to come up with the material. Just getting the goddamn CD done was a whole ordeal."

During this time, drummer Brian Harvey was replaced by Adam Jarvis. Vocalist J.R. Hayes remarked that the band's relationship with Harvey had "run its course" such that he "wasn't prepared to continue with the status quo". Hull described Harvey as "checking out mentally" and "cancelling a lot of practices and not showing up and not really practicing on his own", which led to the band determining near the end of 2010 that "it wasn't going to work out...That's when some blowout happened and he was left to go on his own path".

Hayes noted that the span of time between albums was due to the band being in "upheaval...There was a time when I wasn't sure if the band would go on or not. It took us a while to put ourselves back together." Hull attributed the band's back-to-basics approach to the addition of Jarvis: "Getting a new drummer...inspired us to go back to a shorter, faster and louder demo that we prided ourselves in early on." Prior to Jarvis joining the band, Pig Destroyer had rehearsed with Dave Witte several times before an injury and touring commitments with Municipal Waste led him to step aside.

Hull explained that the internal turmoil, particularly the drummer situation, had an impact upon the songwriting for Book Burner:

It's been a process to get this material written over the course of now three different drummers. The writing process started before Brian ever left the band. There are songs written when Brian was in the band, songs written when Dave was in the band and there were songs written of course, when Adam joined the band. So they're all written to the different strengths of three different drummers. In fact, most of my drum machine demos are intended as a rough sketch but to Adam's credit he really came in and just learned the drum lines verbatim, which blew me away because I wasn't expecting that.

Book Burner was also written as a reaction to Phantom Limb, which Scott Hull described as "really written as kind of an experiment to explore longer songs and song structures, things that were catchier and thrashier and that had repeats and structures that were pretty standard." Hull revealed that this approach was driven, in part, by Harvey's changing musical interests: "towards the end, it was very difficult to do anything like that [short, fast songs], it was easier to do the mid-pace stuff. But with Adam, we got really inspired to go back to those roots where we just wanted to blast and play really super fast the whole time, so there's a lot of that on Book Burner. It wasn't like we felt like we needed to go back to Prowler in the Yard or Terrifyer intentionally, we just felt like, 'Hey, we can do this again now!'"

== Concept ==
Similar to Phantom Limb, Hayes opted to avoid imparting "as much of an overall theme" to Book Burner "because I think people become too focused on that. And I just want to make it more about individual pieces". However, Hayes did concede that there were links between the individual songs on the album, some of which he was "not even conscious of...[until] other people...basically tell me what the concept is, and what the themes are, and I might not have even been aware of that until somebody says it."

Hayes explained that "Book Burner", the song from which the album drew its title, was based on Julius Caesar's quote, "Men freely believe what they wish." For Hayes, the quote represented:

The way the world works now. There's so much information, which you'd think is a good thing, but now it can be hard to decide what's true and what people actually believe and why they believe it. Empirical evidence only matters if people allow it to matter to them. So I felt like you don't even have to burn the book: people don't even read them. People are being pulled in so many different directions by so many different ideas that, even for myself, it's extremely hard to even know what the truth is. It used to be that if you sought the truth, you would do it in books. Nowadays, there are so many things assaulting you at the same time, that you just have to choose.

== Recording and production ==
Prior to recording Book Burner, Pig Destroyer built their own studio, Visceral Sound. As Blake Harrison, who plays electronic instruments for the band, explained, the band "all had a hand in building it" after getting kicked out of their practice space (a basement in former drummer Brian Harvey's parents' house) several years earlier. Scott Hull explained that the time spent building and moving into a new studio, which also served as the band's new practice space, attracted "a big liability of falling into a kind of a slump. So when we finally got back to where we were practicing in the new place, we were out of practice, trying to get back into fighting shape for new material, let alone the old setlist material. It was very laborious. It felt like we were dragging an anchor behind us the whole time".

The album was also informed by the band's experience at a third-party studio for the recording of Phantom Limb, which caused Harrison to remark that "I'm not gonna name any names, but Scott mixed Phantom Limb, and it was because the people we were working with didn't really 'get' what we were trying to do". Hull elaborated that "we wanted to maintain control over getting the sounds and our environment and stuff so in that sense it was a lot easier for us to record here having built the studio, having the equipment and making sure that everything sounded the way it needed to sound". Hull explained his goal in producing the album:

I wanted something that was very, very natural sounding. Not unproduced, but just very, very natural, sort of like the early Black Flag records or the early Melvins records; something that was just very honest and you can hear what the drummer's doing, you can hear what the guitar player's doing, and not oversaturate it with a huge wall of guitars. I just kind of wanted it to be rather 'bare bones' and let the music speak for itself in the performances as well. I wanted it to sound good and clean, somewhat, but I also didn't want to overproduce it by putting in a bunch of triggers and stuff like that.

== Deluxe edition ==
In addition to the album, a seven-song EP composed of covers entitled Blind, Deaf & Bleeding, and a short story entitled "The Atheist" were included in deluxe versions of Book Burner. The Blind, Deaf & Bleeding EP focused on American hardcore songs from the 1980s, such as Black Flag and Circle Jerks. The story, written by Hayes, was described by the author as "only very loosely" based on the album concept, as he "didn't want to tie it in too much, since the story was only going to be included with the deluxe version". Instead, Hayes suggested, "there are a couple peripheral tie-ins" between the book and the album, including the appearance of the phrase "book burner" in both. "You might say the philosophical ideas of mental independence and fighting for your right to think for yourself are also tied to the record", Hayes explained. Hayes summarized the plot for "The Atheist" as being "about a guy who grew up as a Christian and in early adulthood decides he didn't want to be a Christian. He becomes a biology teacher. Then the U.S. descends into a theocracy and becomes very fascist. Everyone converts and he's like 'fuck it.' He abandons his wife and society and lives in the woods like a crazy person." In the "thanks" portion of the liner notes, Hayes dedicates "The Atheist" to author Christopher Hitchens.

== Reception ==
Professional ratings
Aggregate scores
Source	Rating
Metacritic	86/100
Review scores
Source	Rating
AllMusic	4.5/5 stars
Blabbermouth.net	9.5/10
Consequence of Sound	4.5/5 stars
Exclaim!	9/10
Loudwire	4.5/5 stars
MetalSucks	5/5 stars
The Music	3.5/5 stars
Pitchfork	8.0/10
PopMatters	9/10
Slant Magazine	3/5 stars

The album received "universal acclaim" according to Metacritic. Denise Falzon praised Book Burner in Exclaim! for going "back to basics with whiplash-fast tracks" with a streamlined approach that "manage[s] to surpass expectations with a less-is-more approach that results in a thoroughly mind-blowing record." Writing for Pitchfork, Jess Harvell described the album as "utterly ugly, thoroughly alienating stuff that doesn't give half a shit if you can stomach its musical and spiritual violence" and noted that it was "less user-friendly than Phantom Limb". Ray Van Horn Jr. wrote for Blabbermouth.net that Book Burner was "perhaps the most metal album of 2012" and drew attention to the band's "gauntlet of blitzing grind and thrash modes" while noting the band's approach resembled the "old days of hardcore only with the benefit of modern technology". Loudwire's Graham Hartmann suggested that the album was "essential listening" that "continues to deliver the calculated punishment of the band's previous albums, leaving fans as battered, yet willing victims." Describing the album as a "frenzied testament to guitar-based violence", Gregory Heaney praised Book Burner for its sonic clarity, "allowing each gloriously destructive riff to come through crystal clear rather than getting lost in the pummeling drums stampede" and "giving listeners the opportunity to not just feel the bottomless wells of aggression and unfiltered anger that Pig Destroyer channel into their music, but to actually hear and appreciate how technical they are." Comparing Book Burner to Phantom Limb, Craig Hayes of Popmatters observed that the former is more "stripped down" yet "equally masterful" in its songwriting, ultimately "propel[ling] an already lauded band into the realms of the truly legendary."

A more critical tack was taken by Yorgo Douramacos of Slant Magazine, who described the album as "ugly, abrasive, and entirely unpleasant" and questioned whether the album concept was supported by the musical approach: "It's perfectly legitimate that the members of Pig Destroyer should fear censorship and the loss of civil liberties, but can savagery in art ever be an effective antidote to a savage world?"

== In popular culture ==
"The Diplomat" was featured on the season three finale of American sitcom Workaholics. The song was featured during a scene that was described as "a huge rat-killing spree".

== Track listing ==
Book Burner track listing
No.	Title	Length
1.	"Sis"	1:14
2.	"The American's Head"	0:48
3.	"The Underground Man"	0:31
4.	"Eve"	1:14
5.	"The Diplomat"	2:56
6.	"All Seeing Eye"	0:42
7.	"Valley of the Geysers"	2:19
8.	"Book Burner"	0:40
9.	"Machiavellian"	1:12
10.	"Baltimore Strangler"	3:18
11.	"White Lady"	1:25
12.	"The Bug"	3:05
13.	"Iron Drunk"	1:43
14.	"Burning Palm"	1:52
15.	"Dirty Knife"	1:13
16.	"Totaled"	0:42
17.	"Kamikaze Heart"	1:35
18.	"King of Clubs"	1:05
19.	"Permanent Funeral"	4:08
Total length:		31:42

Deluxe Edition bonus tracks (Blind, Deaf and Bleeding EP)
No.	Title	Length
1.	"Depression" (Black Flag cover)	2:18
2.	"Wolfsblood" (Misfits cover)	1:12
3.	"Lights Out" (Angry Samoans cover)	0:51
4.	"Can't Tell No One" (Negative Approach cover)	1:15
5.	"Deny Everything" (Circle Jerks cover)	0:22
6.	"Betray" (Minor Threat cover)	2:58
7.	"Who Are You?" (Void cover) / "Underage" (unlisted Poison Idea cover)	2:21
Total length:		11:18

== Personnel ==
=== Pig Destroyer ===
- J.R. Hayes – vocals
- Scott Hull – guitar, noises
- Adam Jarvis – drums
- Blake Harrison – noises, vocals

=== Additional musicians ===
- Jason Netherton (Misery Index) – vocals ("The Diplomat")
- Richard Johnson (Agoraphobic Nosebleed) – vocals ("The Underground Man")
- Katherine Katz (Agoraphobic Nosebleed) – vocals ("Eve", "The Bug")
