= Siege (band) =

American hardcore punk band

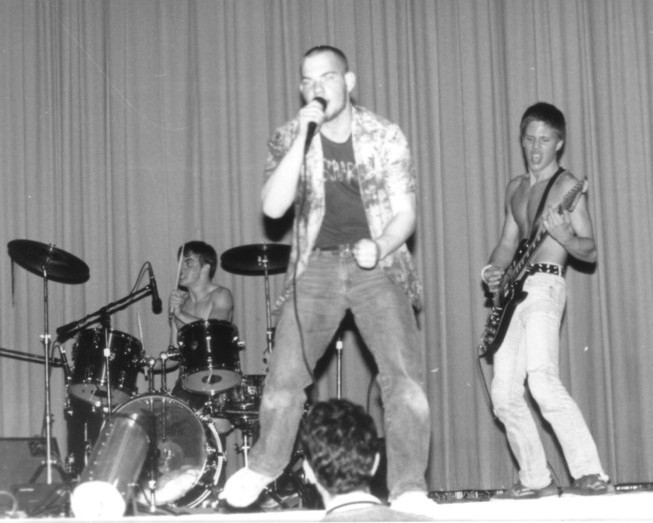
- Siege at their high school's 'Battle of the Bands' in 1984. Left to right: Rob Williams, Kevin Mahoney, and Kurt Habelt.

Background information
- Origin: Weymouth, Massachusetts, U.S.
- Genres: Hardcore punk; thrashcore; powerviolence
- Years active: 1981–1985, 1991–1992, 2016–2024
- Labels: Deranged, Deep Six, Relapse, PATAC
- Past members: Kurt Habelt; Rob Williams; Hank McNamee; Kevin Mahoney; Seth Putnam; Chris Leamy; Mark Fields; Ben Barnett; Paul Kraynak; Alex Smith

Siege was an American hardcore punk band from Weymouth, Massachusetts. Formed in 1981, they were active in the Boston hardcore scene from 1984 to 1985, and reunited briefly in 1991. Drummer Rob Williams and guitarist Kurt Habelt led reunion performances between 2016 and 2024.

In its original incarnation, Siege paired extremely fast tempos with vocalist Kevin Mahoney's screeches and growls in their intense style of hardcore. Though little known at the time, the band has posthumously become revered by punk and heavy metal fans worldwide and is now regarded as one of the pioneers of the grindcore and powerviolence subgenres.

== History ==
=== Formation, early years (1981–1984) ===
Then teenagers, the members of what would become Siege began playing together in 1981 in Weymouth. Guitarist Kurt Habelt, bassist Hank McNamee, and drummer Rob Williams rehearsed together informally during this time. They completed Siege's classic lineup in 1983, recruiting vocalist and occasional saxophonist Kevin Mahoney from nearby Braintree.

Self-described as a "second wave" punk band, they cited hardcore punk and new wave of British heavy metal bands, as well as the desire to play faster than their predecessors, as formative influences on their sound. Siege's first official show was at a Battle of the Bands in early 1984 at Weymouth North High School. They were disqualified for obscenities and McNamee's smashing of his bass onstage.

=== Radiobeat sessions, breakup (1984–1985) ===
Siege recorded a six-song demo tape at Radiobeat Records in Kenmore Square on February 6, 1984. The demo was produced by Lou Giordano, the producer of records by Hüsker Dü, Negative FX, SS Decontrol, Goo Goo Dolls, and many others. It would later be extensively bootlegged. In October 1984 the band recorded three more songs at Radiobeat with Giordano for Pushead's classic 1985 hardcore compilation Cleanse the Bacteria. Those 3 songs were Siege's only official original release.

Giordano later recalled those sessions:

The way our studio operated was that anything that comes in – there's no value judgments made about the music. We just record it. Still, one of the things that I guess was cool about being a staff engineer is that I wouldn't have sought out a band like that. I wasn't philosophically into anything that they were doing, but they were all good musicians – you would have to be to stay together at the speeds they were playing at. So there was that aspect of it, and just the whole pushing the envelope thing. It sounds like it's just gonna completely break apart going 700 miles through the sky and then all of a sudden everything just comes right together again.

And they were some of the most unassuming, laid-back people to ever work with. I mean, they had no attitude at all. They just came in and they were just really polite and very thankful, and then when they turned on the amps and made that noise, it was just unbelievable that it was coming from them.

Despite their proximity to Boston, Siege did not fit into Boston's crew-dominated straight edge hardcore scene, and performed most of their gigs farther away in Western Massachusetts, Connecticut, and Rhode Island. They played in Greenfield with local hardcore bands DYS, Cancerous Growth, The Freeze, B.I.U, Outpatients, and Deep Wound, out of state at the Living Room in Providence, and at Anthrax in Stamford.

In 1985, Siege was scheduled to play their first show in New York City at CBGB with The Necros. Mahoney did not show up for the gig, and Siege disbanded shortly thereafter.

=== Reunion (1991–1992) ===
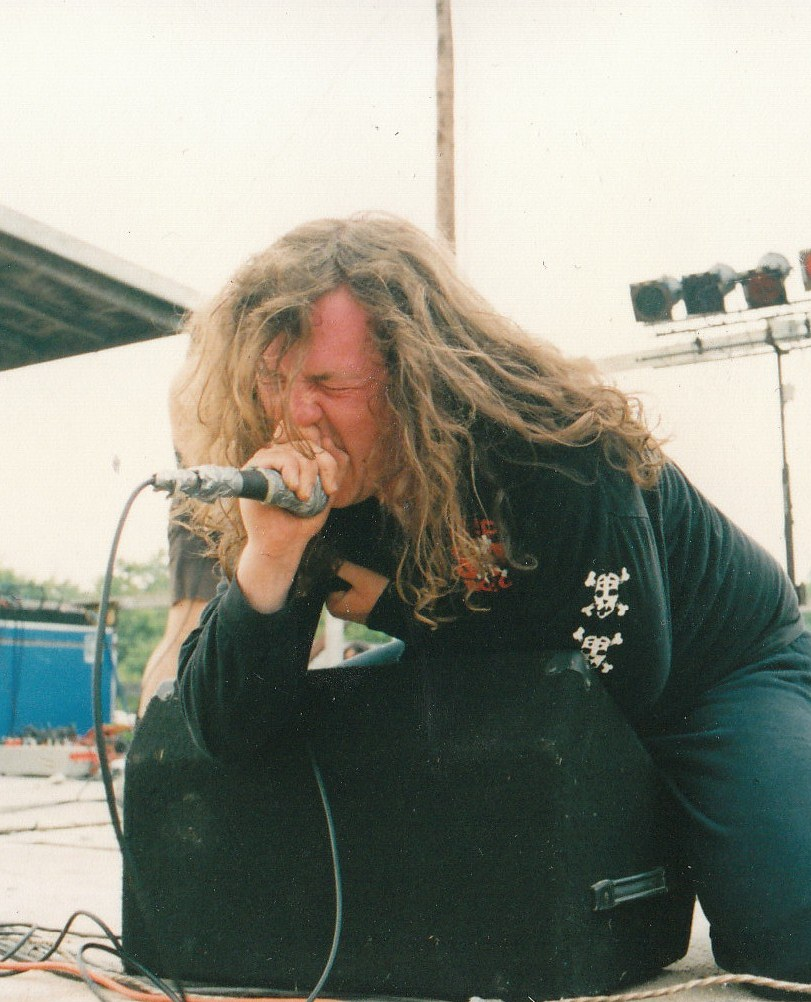
Anal Cunt vocalist Seth Putnam fronted the band during their brief 1991 reunion.

Siege reformed briefly in 1991 with Anal Cunt vocalist Seth Putnam replacing Mahoney. They recorded a four-song demo that was believed to be lost due to the master reel being damaged. McNamee left the band after their first show in April of 1992 and was replaced by Alex Smith, and they played one show with the bands Sloppy Seconds and Toe Tag before disbanding in August 1992. Williams later called the 1990s lineup a "false-start" reunion.

=== Post-breakup and legacy ===
Despite writing a mere 20 minutes of music and never playing outside of New England, Siege became highly influential. Their tracks on Cleanse the Bacteria exposed them to wide audiences, including Lars Ulrich of Metallica, who described them as the fastest band he had ever heard. Numerous pioneering bands establishing the death metal and grindcore subgenres in the 1980s cited Siege as a formative influence, including British groups Carcass and Napalm Death. Their demo became a highly sought-after bootleg in collector circuits.

Relapse Records officially released Siege's demo and compilation tracks in 1994 as the Drop Dead CD. The same material was released on 12-inch vinyl in 2004 by Deep Six Records. Two separate additional reissues of the original Siege material issued on LP in 2006 and 2009 by the Deep Six label contained an additional three tracks, "Two-Faced", "Trained To Kill", and "Questions Behind The Wall", recorded during Radiobeat sessions.

The 1991 recording was unreleased for many years. The track "Cameras" was eventually issued on the 13 Bands Who Think You're Gay compilation LP released by Putnam in 2004. The additional three tracks—"Death & Taxes", "New World Order" and "Disregard"—were thought to be lost before being rediscovered on cassette in 2014. The four songs were released on PATAC Records as the "Lost Session '91" 7-inch later that year.

Williams remained musically active and formed the band Nightstick, which additionally featured Putnam and Habelt at times. Williams and Mahoney also played together in The Spoils, who released the ...To the Victor LP in 2007. Putnam died of a suspected heart attack on July 11, 2011, while Mahoney died on October 14 that year after an extended battle with diabetes.

Williams occasionally performed Siege material live with the Providence band Dropdead, including at Mayland Death Fest in 2014. A performance in Cambridge, Massachusetts in February 2015 was billed as their final live collaboration.

=== Live reunion performances (2016–2024) ===
In 2016, Williams and Habelt gathered an ensemble of musicians to play Siege's classic material live. This live group was completed by vocalist Mark Fields, second guitarist Chris Leamy (bandleader of Brian Famine, and a member of Japanese Torture Comedy Hour with Pig Destroyer guitarist Scott Hull), and bassist Paul Kraynak. They played their first show in Providence with headliners Infest.

Leamy switched to bass to replace Kraynak in 2017, and second guitarist Ben Barnett from Dropdead joined later that year. Performances included guest saxophone players such as John Zorn, Ernie Kim, "Party" Marty Phillips, and John “Westy” Weston. The band played a show at the Midway Cafe in Boston September 2022, prior to playing the London hardcore festival Chimpyfest. They played further dates in 2023 and, without Barnett, in 2024.

== Covers ==
- Napalm Death covered "Walls" on their second John Peel session and "Conform" on Leaders Not Followers: Part 2.
- Disrupt covered "Cold War" on their 1992 live EP Smash Divisions.
- Witch Hunt covered "Conform" on their Crucial Chaos Sessions.
- Lycanthrophy covered "Conform" on their split with Say Why.
- Anal Cunt included a section of "New World Order" in the Siege medley on their album Morbid Florist in 1993.
- Exhumed covered "Drop Dead" on their covers album Garbage Daze Re-Regurgitated.
- Williams's sludge metal band Nightstick covered "New World Order" as "The Pentagon" in 1998.
- Mr. Bungle covered "Cold War" on their 1995 and 2023 tours.
- Ripcord covered "Starvation" on their Harvest Hardcore EP as well as a live cover of "Walls" featuring vocals by Lee Dorian on their Live At Parkhof Alkmaar Holland - 18/09/1988 album.
- Intense Degree covered "Conform" on the Manic Ears North Atlantic Noise Attack compilation.
- Heresy recorded "Conform" during the sessions yielding the Face Up To It! LP, and the outtake later appeared on the Voice Your Opinion discography CD.
- Rat Lord (no) covered "Starvation" on the B-side for their "Destroy" single in 2021
- Water Torture covered "Walls" on their split with Corrupt Bastards.
- Pillage covered "Starvation" on their 2013 demo 7-inch.
- Voltifobia covered "Drop Dead" on their split tape with Agathocles.
- Extreme Smoke 57 covered Conform on their first split 7-inch with The Sexorcist in 1991.

== Band members ==
Classic lineup

- Kurt Habelt – guitar (1981–1985, 1991–1992, 2016–2024)
- Rob Williams – drums (1981–1985, 1991–1992, 2016–2024)
- Hank McNamee – bass (1981–1985, 1991–1992)
- Kevin Mahoney – vocals, saxophone (1983–1985; died 2011)

Later members

- Seth Putnam – vocals (1991–1992; died 2011)
- Alex Smith – bass (1992)
- Mark Fields – vocals (2016–2024)
- Chris Leamy – guitar (2016–2017), bass (2017–2024)
- Paul Kraynak – bass (2016–2017)
- Ben Barnett – guitar (2018–2023)

Timeline

== Discography ==
Demos

- Drop Dead (1984) (cassette, self-released)

Albums

- Drop Dead (1994) (CD, Relapse Records) (Demo '84 + Cleanse the Bacteria compilation tracks)

EPs

- "Lost Session '91" (2014) (7-inch, PATAC Records)

Compilation appearances

- Cleanse the Bacteria (1985) (12-inch, Pusmort Records) (3 tracks - "Sad But True", "Cold War", and "Walls")
- 13 Bands Who Think You're Gay (2004) (12-inch, Menace to Sobriety Records) (1 track - "Cameras")
