= Everyone Should Be Killed =

Studio album by Anal Cunt
- Released: May 24, 1994
- Recorded: Iguana Studios, Weymouth, Massachusetts, March 1993 – late 1993
- Genre: Grindcore
- Length: 58:11
- Label: Earache
- Producer: Tina Morrisey, A.C.

Anal Cunt chronology
Breaking the Law (1993)	Everyone Should Be Killed (1994)	Old Stuff, Part Two (1994)

Alternative cover
- European and Japanese cover

Professional ratings
Review scores
Source	Rating
Allmusic	1.5/5 stars

Everyone Should Be Killed is the debut full-length studio album by American grindcore band Anal Cunt, released by Earache Records on May 24, 1994. It was the only studio album the band recorded with Fred Ordonez on guitar, as he was dismissed from the band during the recording of the album. Seth Putnam was the second guitar player on the songs recorded after Ordonez was dismissed. He went on to record guitar overdubs on every Earache album with the exception of Top 40 Hits and It Just Gets Worse.

== Track listing ==
No.	Title	Writer(s)	Length
1.	"Some Songs"	Anal Cunt	0:37
2.	"Some More Songs"	Anal Cunt	0:49
3.	"Blur Including New H.C. Song"	Anal Cunt	1:16
4.	"Even More Songs"	Anal Cunt	0:34
5.	"Tim"	Anal Cunt	0:41
6.	"Judge"	Anal Cunt	0:43
7.	"Spin Cycle"	Anal Cunt	0:29
8.	"Song #8"	Seth Putnam	2:09
9.	"Pavorotti"	Anal Cunt	0:52
10.	"Unbelievable" (EMF cover)	EMF	0:42
11.	"Music Sucks"	Anal Cunt	0:25
12.	"Newest H.C. Song #1"	Salmon Patties, Putnam	0:13
13.	"Chiffon and Chips"	Anal Cunt	0:49
14.	"Guy Smiley"	Anal Cunt	0:59
15.	"Seth"	Anal Cunt	0:52
16.	""I'm Not Allowed to Like A.C. Any More Since They Signed to Earache Records""	Putnam	1:21
17.	"A. Ex. A Blur"	Anal Cunt	0:41
18.	"G.M.O.T.R."	Anal Cunt	0:51
19.	"I'm Wicked Underground"	Anal Cunt	0:34
20.	"Blur Including G"	Anal Cunt	1:02
21.	"Shut Up Mike"	Anal Cunt	0:19
22.	"Abomination of Unnecessarily Augmented Composition Monickers"	Anal Cunt	0:49
23.	"Radio Hit"	Putnam	1:04
24.	"Loser"	Anal Cunt	0:55
25.	"When I Think of True Punk Rock Bands, I Think of Nirvana and the Melvins"	Anal Cunt	1:31
26.	"Eddy Grant" (Covers of "Electric Avenue" and "I Don't Wanna Dance" by Eddy Grant)	Eddy Grant	0:47
27.	"MTV Is My Source for New Music"	Anal Cunt	1:05
28.	"Song Titles Are Fucking Stupid"	Anal Cunt	0:33
29.	"Having to Make Up Song Titles Sucks"	Anal Cunt	1:03
30.	""Well You Know, Mean Gene...""	Anal Cunt	0:51
31.	"Song #5"	Putnam	5:36
32.	"Iron Funeral"	Anal Cunt	2:00
33.	"Chapel of Gristle"	Anal Cunt	0:48
34.	"Hell Bent for Leatherman"	Anal Cunt	0:43
35.	"Alcoholic"	Putnam	2:43
36.	"Chump Change"	Anal Cunt	0:30
37.	"Slow Song from Split 7""	Anal Cunt	1:40
38.	"Les Binks' Hairstyle"	Anal Cunt	0:57
39.	"Newest H.C. Song #2"	Anal Cunt	0:19
40.	"Greatful Dead"	Putnam	1:20
41.	"Aging Disgracefully"	Anal Cunt	1:06
42.	"Brutally Morbid Axe of Satan"	Anal Cunt	0:20
43.	"Surfer"	Anal Cunt	0:59
44.	"You Must Be Wicked Underground If You Own This"	Anal Cunt	1:05
45.	"Choke Edge"	Jack Kelly	1:06
46.	"Otis Sistrunk"	Putnam	0:37
47.	"Russty Knoife"	Anal Cunt	0:37
48.	"Fred Bash"	Anal Cunt	0:12
49.	"Guess Which 10 of These Are Actual Song Titles"	Anal Cunt	0:46
50.	"Our Band Is Wicked Sick (We Have the Flu)"	Anal Cunt	0:32
51.	"Guy le Fleur"	Putnam	1:39
52.	"Song #3"	Anal Cunt	1:04
53.	"Empire Sandwich Shop"	Anal Cunt	0:33
54.	"Morrissey"	Anal Cunt	0:41
55.	"Selling Out By Having Song Titles on His Album"	Anal Cunt	0:38
56.	"Grindcore Is Very Terrifying"	Putnam	0:29
57.	"Song #6"	Anal Cunt	2:53
58.	"Guy Lombardo"	Anal Cunt	0:42
Total length:			58:11

== Personnel ==
Musicians

- Tim Morse - drums
- Fred Ordonez - guitar (tracks: 8, 16, 31, 35, 40, 46, 51, 57)
- John Kozik - guitar (tracks: 1 to 7, 9 to 15, 17 to 30, 32 to 34, 36 to 39, 41 to 45, 47 to 50, 52 to 56, 58)
- Seth Putnam - vocals, guitar

Additional personnel

- Tina Morrisey – production
- Bruce Freisinger – production
- Yasuhiro Koketsu – photography
- Rob Williams – On album cover
- Chris Joyce – On album cover
