= Drop Dead (album) =

- 1994 Relapse release

Studio album by Siege
- Released: 1984
- Recorded: February 6, 1984; Radiobeat Studios
- Genre: Hardcore punk; powerviolence; thrashcore
- Length: 12:41 (original release); 17:02 (1994 and 2004 reissues); 20:27 (2006 reissue); 20:04 (2009 reissue); 24:54 (30th anniversary edition)
- Label: Relapse, Deep Six
- Producer: Lou Giordano

Alternative Cover
- 2004 Deep Six release

Drop Dead is an album by American hardcore punk band Siege released in 1984. It is the only album the band ever released. The original "album" was a self-released demo cassette with six songs recorded at Radiobeat studios in Boston and produced by Lou Giordano. There were also three songs recorded for Pushead's Cleanse the Bacteria hardcore compilation. When the album was finally given a proper (i.e., non-bootleg) release on CD by Relapse Records in 1994, the three Cleanse the Bacteria tracks were added to the original six demo tape songs.

Deep Six Records then re-released the album on 12" vinyl in 2004, with the identical track list to the Relapse reissue, being the original six songs with the same three compilation tracks added.

These nine tracks, plus four more that remained unreleased at the time, were the only things recorded by Siege until they reformed in 1991 with Seth Putnam of Anal Cunt on lead vocals and recorded a demo tape from which one song, "Cameras", was released in 2004 on the 13 Bands Who Think You're Gay compilation album. A total of four songs were recorded in this session, the final three of which did not appear until their release in 2014 as the Lost Session '91 7" on Patac Records.

However, two separate additional reissues of the original Siege material done on LP in 2006 and 2009 by the Deep Six record label contained an additional three tracks, "Two-Faced", "Trained to Kill", and "Questions Behind the Wall". These tracks are unreleased tracks from the original Drop Dead sessions from 1984. In 2015, Deep Six reissued the album on LP, CD, and cassette, including all three bonus tracks plus a new track from the original sessions, "F-Minus".

In 2019, the album was reissued as Drop Dead: The Complete Discography, containing the original EP, the Cleanse the Bacteria tracks, the four outtakes, the Lost Session '91 tracks and a new recording of "Grim Reaper" from 2016. In 2023, it was repressed with the 2016 recording of "Grim Reaper" replaced by a newer recording from 2022.

== Track listings ==
All songs written by Siege.

Original 1984 release

1. "Drop Dead" – 1:08
2. "Conform" – 2:33
3. "Life of Hate" – 0:28
4. "Starvation" – 0:47
5. "Armageddon" – 0:26
6. "Grim Reaper" – 7:23

1994 Relapse re-issue, 2004 Deep Six reissue

1. "Drop Dead" – 1:08
2. "Conform" – 2:33
3. "Life of Hate" – 0:28
4. "Starvation" – 0:47
5. "Armageddon" – 0:26
6. "Walls" – 1:20
7. "Sad but True" – 1:17
8. "Cold War" – 1:36
9. "Grim Reaper" – 7:23
- Tracks 1–5 & 9 from the original Drop Dead demo cassette, recorded at Radiobeat in Boston, February 6, 1984.
- Tracks 6–8 originally from the Cleanse the Bacteria compilation album, recorded at Radiobeat in Boston, October 26, 1984.

2006 Deep Six reissue

1. "Drop Dead" – 1:08
2. "Conform" – 2:33
3. "Life of Hate" – 0:28
4. "Starvation" – 0:47
5. "Armageddon" – 0:26
6. "Walls" – 1:20
7. "Sad but True" – 1:17
8. "Cold War" – 1:36
9. "Two-Faced" – 2:41
10. "Trained to Kill" – 0:33
11. "Grim Reaper" – 7:23
- Tracks 1–5 & 11 from the original Drop Dead demo cassette.
- Tracks 6–8 originally from the Cleanse the Bacteria compilation album.
- Track 9 & 10 previously unreleased from original 1984 studio session.

2009 Deep Six reissue

1. "Drop Dead" – 1:08
2. "Conform" – 2:33
3. "Life of Hate" – 0:28
4. "Starvation" – 0:47
5. "Armageddon" – 0:26
6. "Walls" – 1:20
7. "Sad but True" – 1:17
8. "Cold War" – 1:36
9. "Questions Behind The Wall" – 2:50
10. "Grim Reaper" – 7:23
- Tracks 1–5 & 10 from the original Drop Dead demo cassette.
- Tracks 6–8 originally from the Cleanse the Bacteria compilation album.
- Track 9 previously unreleased from original 1984 studio session.

2015 Deep Six reissue (30th anniversary edition)

1. "Drop Dead" – 1:08
2. "Conform" – 2:33
3. "Life of Hate" – 0:28
4. "Starvation" – 0:47
5. "Armageddon" – 0:26
6. "Grim Reaper" – 7:23
7. "Sad but True" – 1:17
8. "Walls" – 1:20
9. "Cold War" – 1:36
10. "Two-Faced" – 2:41
11. "Trained to Kill" – 0:33
12. "Questions Behind the Wall" – 2:50
13. "F-Minus" – 1:26
- Tracks 1–6 from the original Drop Dead demo cassette.
- Tracks 7–9 originally from the Cleanse the Bacteria compilation album.
- Tracks 10–13 previously unreleased from original 1984 studio session.
- On the LP release, tracks 1–5 and 7–13 were on the A-side, with "Grim Reaper" on the B-side.

== Personnel ==
- Kurt Habelt – guitar
- Rob Williams – drums
- Hank McNamee – bass
- Kevin Mahoney – vocals, saxophone
