= In the Name of Metal =

In the Name of Metal may refer to:

- In the Name of Metal, a 1986 album by Executioner
- In the Name of Metal, a 2012 album by Bloodbound
