= Mass & Volume =

EP by Pig Destroyer
- Released: March 5th, 2013 (Digital); October 14th, 2014 (Physical)
- Recorded: December 2006
- Studio: Omega Studios
- Genres: Sludge metal, drone metal, doom metal
- Length: 25:40
- Label: Relapse

Pig Destroyer chronology
Book Burner (2012)	Mass & Volume (2013)	Head Cage (2018)

Mass & Volume is an EP by American grindcore band Pig Destroyer which was released on March 5, 2013 as a digital release and October 14, 2014 as a physical release through Relapse Records. The EP was written and recorded during the final day of the Phantom Limb sessions. It is dedicated to the memory of Pat Egan, a member of the Relapse Records family who died on February 18, 2013. All proceeds from the sale of the record were donated to Egan's daughter's college fund.

== Track listing ==
No.	Title	Length
1.	"Mass & Volume"	19:05
2.	"Red Tar"	6:35
Total length:		25:40

== Personnel ==
Pig Destroyer

- J.R. Hayes – vocals
- Blake Harrison – bass
- Scott Hull – guitar, additional instrumentation
- Brian Harvey – drums

Production

- Shannon Follin – recording
- Scotty O'Toole – recording
- Arik Roper – cover
- Orion Landau – artwork
- Josh Sisk – photography
