= Anal Cunt discography =

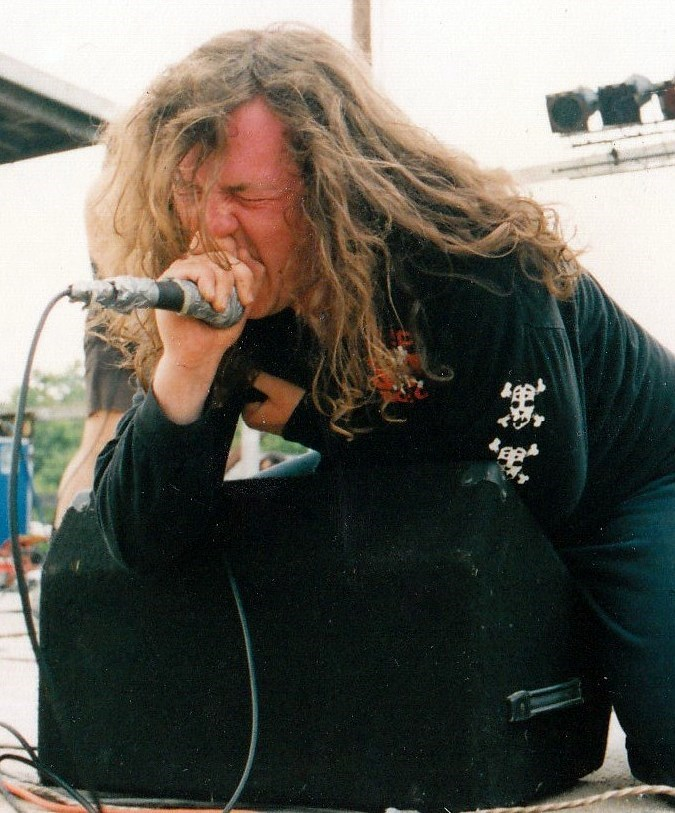
- Vocalist Seth Putnam
- Studio albums: 8
- Live albums: 1
- Compilation albums: 5
- Extended plays: 11
- Split EPs: 8

Anal Cunt was an American grindcore band from Newton, Massachusetts. Formed in 1988, their discography consists of eight studio albums, one live album, five compilation albums, eleven extended plays (EPs) and eight split EPs. Anal Cunt disbanded in 2011 due to the death of frontman Seth Putnam.

== Albums ==
=== Studio albums ===
List of studio albums
Title	Release details
Everyone Should Be Killed	Released: May 24, 1994; Label: Earache; Formats: CD, LP, CS
Top 40 Hits	Released: March 7, 1995; Label: Earache; Formats: CD, LP, CS
40 More Reasons to Hate Us	Released: March 26, 1996; Label: Earache; Formats: CD, CS
I Like It When You Die	Released: February 11, 1997; Label: Earache; Format: CD
Picnic of Love	Released: July 21, 1998; Label: Off the Records; Format: CD, LP
It Just Gets Worse	Released: November 9, 1999; Label: Earache; Format: CD
110 Song CD	Released: November 20, 2008; Label: Wicked Sick; Formats: CD, LP
Fuckin' A	Released: August 10, 2010; Label: PATAC; Format: CD

=== Compilation albums ===
List of compilation albums
Title	Release details
Fast Boston HC (also Greatest Hits Volume One)	Released: 1991; Label: Ecocentric; Format: CD
Old Stuff – Part Two	Released: 1994; Label: Devour; Format: CD
The Early Years 1988–1991	Released: 2000; Label: Artemis; Format: 2CD
Defenders of the Hate	Released: 2007; Label: Menace to Sobriety, Wicked Sick Records (digital); Format: CD; Note: not to be confused with the 2001 7-inch EP of the same name
Old Stuff – Part 3	Released: July 24, 2008; Label: Wicked Sick, Limited Appeal (vinyl); Format: CD
Wicked Dead: Demos and Early Fucked Up Shit (bootleg)	Released: 2012; Label: Gay Metal; Format: LP

== Extended plays ==
=== Solo EPs ===
List of solo extended plays
Title	Release details
88 Song E.P.	Released: 1989; Label: Wicked Sick; Format: 7-inch vinyl
5643 Song EP	Released: 1989; Label: Stridecore; Format: 7-inch vinyl
Another E.P.!	Released: 1990; Label: TNT & Records; Format: 7-inch vinyl
Live EP	Released: 1991; Label: Psycho Mania; Format: 7-inch vinyl
Unplugged	Released: 1991; Label: Psycho Mania; Format: 7-inch vinyl
Morbid Florist	Released: September 23, 1993; Label: Relapse; Format: 7-inch vinyl, CD
Breaking the Law	Released: 1993; Label: Bostons Finest; Format: 7-inch vinyl
Defenders of the Hate	Released: 2001; Label: Menace to Sobriety; Format: 7-inch vinyl, CD
Howard Is Bald	Released: 2001; Label: none (self-released); Format: 7-inch vinyl
Very Rare Rehearsal from February 1989	Released: March 1, 2002; Label: Shipman; Format: CD
Wearing Out Our Welcome	Released: August 2011; Label: Limited Appeal; Format: 12-inch vinyl

=== Split EPs ===
List of split extended plays
Title	Release details
We'll Just Have to Acclimatize Ourselves to the Post-Nuclear Area (with Seven Minutes of Nausea)	Released: 1989; Label: TNT & Records; Format: 7-inch vinyl
Good Bye, the Legends (with Patareni)	Released: 1990; Label: Falšanja Kol'ko'š; Format: 7-inch vinyl
Another Split EP (with Meat Shits)	Released: 1991; Label: Wicked Sick; Format: 7-inch vinyl
Split (with Psycho)	Released: 1991; Label: Ax/ction; Format: 7-inch vinyl
In These Black Days: A Tribute to Black Sabbath (Vol. I) (with Eyehategod)	Released: 1997; Label: Hydra Head; Format: 7-inch vinyl
Live in N.Y.C./Live in L.A. (with Insult)	Released: 1999; Label: Wicked Sick; Format: CD
Split EP (with The Raunchous Brothers)	Released: 2000; Label: Menace to Sobriety; Format: 7-inch vinyl
Split EP with Flächenbrand (with Flächenbrand)	Released: 2001; Label: Regurgitated Semen; Format: 7-inch vinyl

== Other appearances ==
List of other appearances
Title	Year	Release
Untitled songs	1992	Apocalyptic Convulsions
Untitled songs	1992	Masters of Noise
"You're Gonna Need Someone on Your Side"	1996	The World Still Won't Listen: A Tribute to the Smiths
"Religious Vomit"	1998	What Were We Fighting For? A Dead Kennedys Tribute
"Olde Tyme Hardcore"	1999	Boston Drops the Gloves: A Tribute to Slapshot
"I Hate Jed Davis, He Sucks and He's Gay"	1999	Everyone Wants to Be Like Jed: A Tribute to Jed Davis
"I'm Glad I'm Not a Girl"	2000	We're Not the Meatmen, But We Still Suck: A Tribute to the Meatmen
"The Great Southern Trendkill"	2000	Panther: A Tribute to Pantera
"Beating up Hippies for their Drugs at a Phish Concert"	2000	Thrash of the Titans
"Fred Shitbreath"	2000	Thrash of the Titans
"You Quit Doing Heroin (Pussy)"	2000	Thrash of the Titans
"2 Turds and a Golfball"	2002	2 Turds and a Golfball
"Ha Ha Holocaust"	2004	13 Bands Who Think You're Gay
"We're Not 'in da House' You Fucking Wigger"	2004	13 Bands Who Think You're Gay
