= Natasha (EP) =

EP by Pig Destroyer
- Released: November 11, 2008
- Recorded: 2004
- Genres: Experimental, sludge metal, drone, doom metal, dark ambient
- Length: 37:55
- Label: Relapse
- Producer: Scott Hull

Pig Destroyer chronology
Phantom Limb (2007)	Natasha (2008)	Book Burner (2012)

Professional ratings
Review scores
Source	Rating
Allmusic	2/5 stars
Collector's Guide to Heavy Metal	8/10
Rock Sound	8/10
Sputnikmusic	3.5/5

Natasha is an EP by Pig Destroyer, released in 2008 by Relapse Records. It consists of a single, unbroken song originally included on special editions of Terrifyer (2004) in DVD-Audio format.

Unlike Pig Destroyer's earlier grindcore material, Natasha showcases the band playing in a sludge/doom style. The EP acts as a continuation and coda of the lyrical concept presented on Terrifyer.

== Track listing ==
1. "Natasha" – 37:55 (Scott Hull, J. R. Hayes)

== Personnel ==
- Scott Hull – guitar, production, recording, engineering, mixing, mastering
- J.R. Hayes – vocals
- Blake Harrison – sampling, ambience, noise
- Brian Harvey – drums
