= Paul Booth (tattoo artist) =

American artist

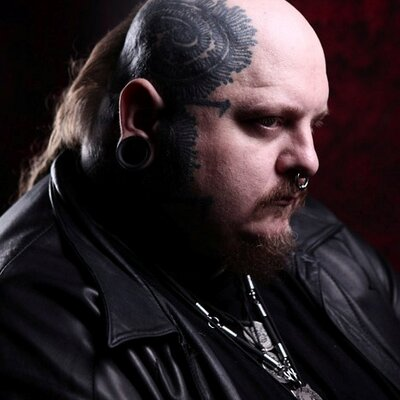
- Born: 1967 (age 58–59)
- Known for: Tattoo artist
- Website: www.lastrites.tv

Paul Booth (born in 1967 in Boonton, New Jersey) is an American tattoo artist, sculptor, painter, filmmaker and musician living in New York City. He is known for his use of black and gray ink tattoo work depicting dark surrealism styled pieces. He has gained celebrity clientele, which include members of metal bands such as Slipknot, Mudvayne, Slayer, Pantera, Soulfly, Biohazard, Limp Bizkit, Deftones, Cradle of Filth, Chimaira, Sevendust, Dimmu Borgir, Coal Chamber, Pig Destroyer and Sepultura.

== Last Rites Tattoo Theater & Art Gallery ==
In 1996, Booth opened Last Rites Tattoo Theatre in New York City. The gallery relocated from Hudson Yards to the Garment District in 2015, which was documented in the 'Paul Booth's Last Rites Volume 1' DVD. The new location was Booth's second gallery and was called the Booth Gallery.

Last Rites Tattoo Theater closed its doors in May of 2020, citing economic distress due to the COVID-19 pandemic.

== The Art Fusion Experiment ==
In the year 2000, Paul Booth was a co-founder of a charitable international art organization known as Art Fusion Experiment (AFE).
