= Prowler in the Yard =

Studio album by Pig Destroyer
- Released: July 24, 2001
- Recorded: August 2000 – March 2001 in Brian Harvey's basement
- Genre: Grindcore
- Length: 36:31
- Label: Relapse
- Producer: Scott Hull

Pig Destroyer chronology
38 Counts of Battery (2000)	Prowler in the Yard (2001)	Benümb / Pig Destroyer (2002)

Prowler in the Yard is the second studio album by American grindcore band Pig Destroyer. It was released on July 24, 2001, by Relapse Records. The album follows a dark and twisted story of love, obsession, and gore. The booklet also features an extra page of prose about the protagonist and "Jennifer". It is now regarded by many as one of the best grindcore releases of all time, namely for ballad-style lyrics, technical ability, unique and catchy guitar riffs and relentless drumming.

== Production ==
The album was recorded between August 2000 and March 2001 on an 8-track in drummer Brian Harvey's basement. Both the opening and closing tracks use a slightly altered rendition of Microsoft SAM.

In the updated 2015 liner notes, front man JR Hayes explained his mental state at the time of writing the album as "...a period of transition, moving from couch to couch in a haze of irresponsible drug use relying on the kindness of strangers." Hayes also mentioned how he had recently broken up with his then girlfriend, leading to him spiralling into a pit of obsession for the next two years.

"This is a record about that obsession. A record about self loathing, depression, anxiety, desperation, loneliness and revenge, with a pathological fixation on pornography and aesthetic beauty." "Songs like 'Cheerleader Corpses' and 'Heart And Crossbones' were my paradoxical attempts to worship and hate someone at the same time. They were me coming to grips with the fact that something beautiful had ended and would never return. However much I loved her, that's how much I despised myself, how much I tortured myself."

After being impressed by the artwork of tattoo artist Paul Booth, guitarist Scott Hull met up with him and requested he do the cover. Hull provided Booth with an idea of what the cover would entail, later recounting:

"...and I kinda had it in my head, there was somebody who was at a complete breaking point, who's sort of falling apart, and he's decided that he's gonna dismantle himself and sort of re-arrange himself in kind of a way that he's trying to get control over his own psychological disintegration by taking his own physicality and re-organising it in a kind of way."

Hull also stated that he drew inspiration from the 'freakout' scene from 'Pink Floyd's The Wall', namely how he "re-arranges the little cigarette butts, he's sort of taking control over the chaos that he's kind of caused".

== Artwork ==
Joe DiVita of Loudwire said: "What this album artwork first brings to mind now is undoubtedly the movie Saw. Well, Prowler in the Yard predates the movie by three years, so this isn't just copying the movie's idea. This Pig Destroyer album cover is disturbing in so many ways. A maniacal man is wielding a hacksaw and has already put it to use to others as well as himself. He has sawn off his left hand, right foot, and somehow through the femur on his left leg. The expression on his face looks like he is rather pleased with his work thus far, but may not be done employing the hacksaw just yet."

In an interview with Kerrang!, Hull noted that Bobby Steele of Misfits and The Undead is featured as the person on the front cover, as he was a personal friend of Paul Booth.

== Track listing ==
All lyrics are written by J. R. Hayes.

No.	Title	Length
1.	"Jennifer"	1:21
2.	"Cheerleader Corpses"	0:35
3.	"Scatology Homework"	0:49
4.	"Trojan Whore"	1:35
5.	"Ghost of a Bullet"	0:20
6.	"Heart and Crossbones"	0:48
7.	"Strangled with a Halo"	1:25
8.	"Intimate Slavery"	1:05
9.	"Mapplethorpe Grey"	1:21
10.	"Evacuating Heaven"	0:16
11.	"Tickets to the Car Crash"	0:39
12.	"Naked Trees"	1:46
13.	"Sheet Metal Girl"	1:09
14.	"Preacher Crawling"	1:29
15.	"Pornographic Memory"	0:57
16.	"Murder Blossom"	0:18
17.	"Body Scout"	1:01
18.	"Snuff Film at Eleven"	1:10
19.	"Hyperviolet"	3:28
20.	"Starbelly"	5:03
21.	"Junkyard God"	1:59
22.	"Piss Angel"	7:57
Total length:		36:31

== Personnel ==
=== Pig Destroyer ===
- Brian Harvey – drums
- J. R. Hayes – vocals
- Scott Hull – guitars

=== Production ===
- Paul Booth – cover art
- Matthew F. Jacobson – executive production
- Scott Kinkade – photography
- Jonathan Canady – design

== Reception ==
Professional ratings
Review scores
Source	Rating
AllMusic	4/5 stars
Collector's Guide to Heavy Metal	7/10
Sputnikmusic	4.5/5

Upon release, the album was praised by both critics and fans alike. In March 2009, Terrorizer named the album the third best American grindcore release of all time. On June 25, 2013, Decibel inducted it as their 102nd entry into their Hall of Fame

== Release history ==
In July 2015, Relapse Records announced that they would be reissuing Prowler in the Yard with remixed and remastered audio, a variety of 2CD and vinyl formats, and exclusive content including photos, liner notes, and an unreleased track.

The 2015 remix omits "Evacuating Heaven". Scott Hull explains in the liner notes that an entire vocal track was missing from the archives during the remixing process; instead of re-recording vocals, the band decided to omit the song altogether. Additionally, the Jennifer epilogue that was at the end of "Piss Angel" was given its own track ID, separating it from the previous song.
