= Psychomania Records =

- Founded: 1984
- Genre: Grindcore, noise
- Country of origin: UK
- Location: Scotland

Psychomania Records was a Scottish record label. They specialized in a brand of noise-infused grindcore, that has become synonymous with the label itself. The label put out releases from The Gerogerigegege, Cripple Bastards, Extreme Smoke, Anal Cunt, Scrawl, Patareni, Crucifix, Meat Shits, Seduce and others.

== See also ==
- List of record labels
