= Picnic of Love =

Studio album by Anal Cunt
- Released: July 21, 1998
- Recorded: December 1997 at Spindrift Studios
- Genres: Acoustic rock; comedy music
- Length: 31:39
- Label: Off the Records

Anal Cunt chronology
I Like It When You Die (1997)	Picnic of Love (1998)	It Just Gets Worse (1999)

Professional ratings
Review scores
Source	Rating
Allmusic	1.5/5 stars

Picnic of Love is the fifth album by Anal Cunt. It was released on July 21, 1998 through Off the Records.

== Music and lyrics ==
The album was released as a joke and a parody of love songs, as well as of the band itself. The album is characterized by the opposite of everything that the band represents. While the normal Anal Cunt album consists of 40 to 50 tracks, mainly under a minute in length, Picnic of Love contains only eleven comparatively long tracks. The downtuned distorted guitars, rapid drumming and screeched vocals of other Anal Cunt albums is replaced by soft acoustic guitar and vocalist Seth Putnam singing in gentle falsetto. The most apparent change is the lyrical content: all of the songs are about inoffensive, sweet subjects as opposed to the band's more typical deliberately offensive or provocative lyrics.

Allmusic's review of the album erroneously claims that Picnic of Love "is a collection of ballads that never ceases to have a tragic and violent ending by the end of each song", but none of the songs actually do feature a climax in this manner. The entire album is almost completely devoid of screamed vocals, with the latter half of the final track, "In My Heart There's a Star Named After You" being the only exception.

== Track listing ==
No.	Title	Length
1.	"Picnic of Love"	2:17
2.	"I Respect Your Feelings as a Woman and a Human"	2:04
3.	"I Wanna Grow Old with You"	2:51
4.	"Saving Ourselves for Marriage"	3:07
5.	"Greed Is Something We Don't Need"	3:13
6.	"I'm Not That Kind of Boy"	2:38
7.	"I Couldn't Afford to Buy You a Present (So I Wrote You This Song)"	3:27
8.	"I'd Love to Have Your Daughter's Hand in Marriage"	1:51
9.	"My Woman, My Lover, My Friend"	3:29
10.	"Waterfall Wishes"	3:16
11.	"In My Heart There's a Star Named After You"	3:27

== Personnel ==
- "Sensitive" Seth Putnam – vocals, mixing
- Allison Dunn – vocals (1, 5)
- "Gentle" Josh Martin – acoustic guitar
- Mike Livingston – recording, engineering, mixing
