= 38 Counts of Battery =

Compilation album by Pig Destroyer
- Released: November 28, 2000
- Recorded: 1997–2000
- Genre: Grindcore
- Length: 39:59
- Label: Relapse

Pig Destroyer chronology
| Isis / Pig Destroyer split (2000) | 38 Counts of Battery (2000) | Prowler in the Yard (2001) |

Professional ratings
Review scores
| Source | Rating |
|---|---|
| Chronicles of Chaos | 9/10 stars |
| Exclaim! | favorable |

38 Counts of Battery is a compilation album by the grindcore band Pig Destroyer, which was released on November 28, 2000 through Relapse Records as part of their Underground series of albums and reissues. The recording collects nearly every release the band issued up to this point in time, including their debut Explosions in Ward 6 album, their splits with Orchid and Isis, and their 1997 demo tape.

== Track list ==
All tracks are written by J. R. Hayes, except where noted.

| No. | Title | Length |
|---|---|---|
| 1. | "Deflower" | 0:28 |
| 2. | "Tentacle" | 0:52 |
| 3. | "Yellow Line Transfer" | 1:03 |
| 4. | "Under the Fingernails" | 0:43 |
| 5. | "Elfin" | 0:32 |
| 6. | "Unwitting Valentine" | 0:29 |
| 7. | "Oven" (Melvins Cover) | 1:20 |
| 8. | "Three Second Apocalypse" | 0:40 |
| 9. | "Treblinka" | 0:50 |
| 10. | "Fingers in the Throat" | 0:37 |
| 11. | "My Fellow Vermin" | 0:41 |
| 12. | "Endgame" | 0:41 |
| 13. | "One Funeral Too Many" | 0:52 |
| 14. | "Higher Forms of Pornography" | 0:55 |
| 15. | "Honeymoon" | 0:37 |
| 16. | "Alcatraz Metaphors" | 0:27 |
| 17. | "Flesh Upon Gear" | 1:05 |
| 18. | "Pixie" | 6:06 |
| 19. | "Genital Grinder/Regurgitation of Giblets" (Carcass Cover) | 2:38 |
| 20. | "Exhume to Consume" (Carcass Cover) | 3:35 |
| 21. | "Burning of Sodom" (Dark Angel Cover) | 2:39 |
| 22. | "Delusional Supremacy" | 0:24 |
| 23. | "Alcatraz Metaphors" | 0:30 |
| 24. | "Treblinka" | 0:23 |
| 25. | "Seven and Thirteen" | 0:21 |
| 26. | "Scouring the Wreckage" | 0:45 |
| 27. | "Torquemada" | 0:34 |
| 28. | "Frailty in Numbers" | 0:47 |
| 29. | "Suicide Through Decay" | 1:01 |
| 30. | "Dark Satellites" (Demo) | 0:35 |
| 31. | "Seven and Thirteen" (Demo) | 0:22 |
| 32. | "Flag Burner" (Demo) | 2:28 |
| 33. | "Delusional Supremacy" (Demo) | 0:26 |
| 34. | "Martyr to the Plague" (Demo) | 0:27 |
| 35. | "Ruination" (Demo) | 0:25 |
| 36. | "Synthetic Utopia" (Demo) | 0:40 |
| 37. | "Monolith" (Demo) | 0:34 |
| 38. | "Frailty in Numbers" (Demo) | 1:11 |

== Personnel ==
- J. R. Hayes – vocals
- Scott Hull – guitars
- Brian Harvey – drums (tracks 1–21)
- John Evans – drums (tracks 22–38)
