= Head Cage =

Studio album by Pig Destroyer
- Released: September 7, 2018
- Recorded: December 2017 – February 2018
- Studio: Visceral Sound Studios (Bethesda, Maryland, United States)
- Genre: Metalcore, grindcore
- Length: 30:55
- Label: Relapse
- Producer: Scott Hull

Pig Destroyer chronology
Mass & Volume (2013)	Head Cage (2018)	the octagonal stairway (2020)

Singles from Head Cage
- 1. "Army of Cops" Released: July 10, 2018

Professional ratings
Aggregate scores
Source	Rating
Metacritic	79/100
Review scores
Source	Rating
AllMusic	3.5/5 stars
Consequence of Sound	7.5/10
Exclaim!	9/10
MetalSucks	5/5 stars
Pitchfork	8.1/10
Sputnikmusic	8/10
Metal Storm	8.0/10

Head Cage is the sixth studio album by American grindcore band Pig Destroyer. The album was released on September 7, 2018, through Relapse Records. The album features vocal cameos from Richard Johnson and Kat Katz from Agoraphobic Nosebleed, along with Dylan Walker from Full of Hell.

The band commented in an official description of Head Cage:

"Across twelve tracks, Pig Destroyer weave together harrowing tales of philosophical dualities, touching on mortality and depression, fear and violence, and the darkest complexities of the human condition, all told through the distorted lens of delightfully transgressive vocalist/lyricist JR Hayes."

== Background ==
It is the band's only album with bassist John Jarvis in their line-up, and the last to feature Blake Harrison, who would leave in 2022 and die in 2024. MetalSucks called the album an "immediate frontrunner for the best metal album of 2018." The band released a teaser for the album on June 27, 2018.

== Reception ==
=== Accolades ===
Publication	Accolade	Rank	Ref.
Decibel	Decibel's Top 40 Albums of 2018	10	

== Track listing ==
All lyrics are written by J. R. Hayes; all music is composed by Scott Hull.

No.	Title	Length
1.	"Tunnel Under the Tracks"	1:21
2.	"Dark Train"	1:11
3.	"Army of Cops"	3:18
4.	"Circle River"	2:45
5.	"The Torture Fields"	2:55
6.	"Terminal Itch"	1:13
7.	"Concrete Beast"	3:21
8.	"The Adventures of Jason and JR"	2:12
9.	"Mt. Skull"	1:37
10.	"Trap Door Man"	1:15
11.	"The Last Song"	2:40
12.	"House of Snakes"	7:07
Total length:		30:55

== Personnel ==
=== Pig Destroyer ===
- J. R. Hayes – lead vocals
- Scott Hull – guitars
- John Jarvis – bass, gang vocals
- Blake Harrison – noise, samples, gang vocals
- Adam Jarvis – drums, gang vocals

=== Additional musicians ===
- Richard Johnson − guest vocals (track 3), gang vocals
- Kat Katz − guest vocals (tracks 6, 7)
- Jason Hodges − guest vocals (track 8)
- Dylan Walker − noise (track 11)
- Aaron "Baron" Kirkpatrick − gang vocals

=== Production ===
- Scott Hull − recording
- Will Putney − mixing, mastering
- Mark McCoy − artwork, layout
- Mark Valentino − photography

== Charts ==
Chart (2018)	Peak position
Belgian Albums (Ultratop Flanders)	146
Scottish Albums (OCC)	100
