= Painter of Dead Girls =

Compilation album by Pig Destroyer
- Released: January 27, 2004
- Recorded: 1999–2003
- Genre: Grindcore
- Length: 19:49
- Label: Robotic Empire

Pig Destroyer chronology
Benümb / Pig Destroyer split (2002)	Painter of Dead Girls (2004)	Terrifyer (2004)

Professional ratings
Review scores
Source	Rating
AllMusic	3/5 stars
Metal Invader	4/5 stars

Painter of Dead Girls is a compilation album by the grindcore band Pig Destroyer. It features songs from their Gnob and Benümb splits as well as a cover of the Helmet song "In the Meantime". J. R. Hayes once said that he did not remember the lyrics to the first seven tracks, and that he could not decipher them. Said lyrics have now been found and are available online . The cover art was done by Chris Taylor of Pg. 99.

The iTunes version of Painter excludes the three cover songs.

== Track listing ==
All lyrics written by J. R. Hayes. All music written by Scott Hull, except where noted.

1. "Hymn" – 1:37
2. "Taskmaster" – 0:45
3. "Black Centipede" – 0:30
4. "Immune to Life" – 0:28
5. "Fuck You Up and Get High" (Dwarves cover) – 0:33
6. "Contagion" – 0:16
7. "Blank Dice" – 0:27
8. "Blonde Prostitute" – 0:55
9. "Patterns of Failure" – 1:25
10. "Rejection Fetish" – 1:38
11. "Dark Satellites" – 0:51
12. "Purity Undone" – 0:34
13. "Forgotten Child" – 1:31
14. "White Sand" – 0:27
15. "Painter of Dead Girls" – 0:49
16. "Down in the Streets" (The Stooges cover) – 3:45
17. "In the Meantime" (Helmet cover) – 3:01

== Personnel ==
- J. R. Hayes – vocals
- Scott Hull – guitar
- Brian Harvey – drums
- Chris Taylor – artwork
