= Top 40 Hits =

Studio album by Anal Cunt
- Released: March 7, 1995
- Recorded: 1994
- Studios: Iguana Studios, Weymouth, Massachusetts
- Genre: Grindcore
- Length: 39:13
- Label: Earache
- Producers: Tina Morrissey & A.C.

Anal Cunt chronology
Howard Is Bald (1995)	Top 40 Hits (1995)	40 More Reasons to Hate Us (1996)

Singles from Top 40 Hits
- 1. "Stayin' Alive (Oi! Version)" Released: 1994

Professional ratings
Review scores
Source	Rating
AllMusic	1.5/5 stars
Collector's Guide to Heavy Metal	3/10
Guitar World	4/5 stars

Top 40 Hits is the second full-length album by Anal Cunt, released in 1995 on CD and cassette by Earache Records.

The cover of this album is a parody of the compilation albums released in the 1970s by TV advertising company K-Tel.

The album was recorded in 1994 as part of the band's attempt to move from playing noisegrind to playing fast hardcore songs, although the album contains both styles. There are also numerous cover songs on the album including those of Rupert Holmes's "Escape (The Pina Colada Song)", The Guess Who's "American Woman", Elton John's "I'm Still Standing", The A-Team theme song, and a cover of the Bee Gees song "Stayin' Alive". Their "Oi! version" of this song was also released as a promotional single before the album was released. Additionally, the song "Lenny's in My Neighborhood" parodies the Body Count song "There Goes the Neighborhood" both lyrically and musically. Seth Putnam said on his old website that he never got the sound he wanted with this album because it was recorded in an ADAT studio instead of an analog studio.

== Track listing ==
No.	Title	Writer(s)	Length
1.	"Some Hits"	Anal Cunt	1:18
2.	"Some More Hits"	Anal Cunt	0:45
3.	"Pepe, the Gay Waiter"	Seth Putnam	0:38
4.	"Even More Hits"	Anal Cunt	0:49
5.	"M.J.C."	Anal Cunt	1:27
6.	"Flower Shop Guy"	Putnam	0:51
7.	"Living Colour Is My Favorite Black Metal Band"	Anal Cunt	0:49
8.	"Lenny's in My Neighborhood"	Anal Cunt	0:40
9.	"Stayin' Alive (Oi! Version)"	The Bee Gees, arranged by Anal Cunt	1:23
10.	"Benchpressing the Effects on Kevin Sharp's Vocals"	Anal Cunt	0:38
11.	"Josue"	Anal Cunt	0:11
12.	"Delicious Face Style"	Putnam	2:01
13.	"#19 to Go"	Putnam	0:16
14.	"'Stealing Seth's Ideas': The New Book by Jon Chang"	Anal Cunt	1:06
15.	"Morbid Dead Guy"	Putnam	1:00
16.	"Believe in the King"	Anal Cunt	0:57
17.	"Don't Call Japanese Hardcore Jap Core"	Putnam	0:35
18.	"Shut Up Mike (Part 2)"	Bratface, Anal Cunt	0:33
19.	"Hey, Aren't You Gary Spivey?"	Anal Cunt	0:43
20.	"Breastfeeding Jm J. Bullock's Toenail Collection"	Putnam	4:49
21.	"Fore Play with a Tree Shredder"	Putnam	0:50
22.	"2 Down, 5 to Go"	Anal Cunt	0:31
23.	"I Liked Earache Better When Dig Answered the Phone"	Anal Cunt	0:29
24.	"Brain Dead"	Kozik, Putnam	1:34
25.	"Newest H.C. Song #3"	Habelt, Patties, Putnam	0:25
26.	"The Sultry Ways of Steve Berger"	Anal Cunt	0:52
27.	"Escape (The Pina Colada Song)" (Rupert Holmes cover)	Rupert Holmes, arranged by Anal Cunt	1:00
28.	"Lives Ruined by Music"	Putnam	2:12
29.	"Still a Freshman After All These Years"	Anal Cunt	0:47
30.	"I'm Still Standing" (Elton John cover)	Elton John and Bernie Taupin, arranged by Anal Cunt	0:10
31.	"Art Fag"	Kraynak, Putnam	0:48
32.	"John"	Anal Cunt	0:37
33.	"Newest H.C. Song #4"	Putnam	0:15
34.	"Song #9"	Putnam	1:33
35.	"Cleft Palate"	Anal Cunt	0:18
36.	"Theme from The A-Team"	Some Guy	0:46
37.	"Old Lady Across the Hall with No Life"	Anal Cunt	1:06
38.	"Shut Up, Paul"	Anal Cunt	0:23
39.	"Lazy Eye (Once a Hank, Always a Hank)"	Anal Cunt	1:03
40.	"American Woman" (The Guess Who cover)	Randy Bachman, Burton Cummings, Jim Kale, Garry Peterson	2:05

== Personnel ==
Musicians

- Tim Morse – drums
- John Kozik – guitar
- Paul Kraynak – guitar
- Seth Putnam – vocals

Additional personnel

- Tina Morrisey – production
- Bruce Freisinger – production
