= Anal Cunt =

American grindcore band

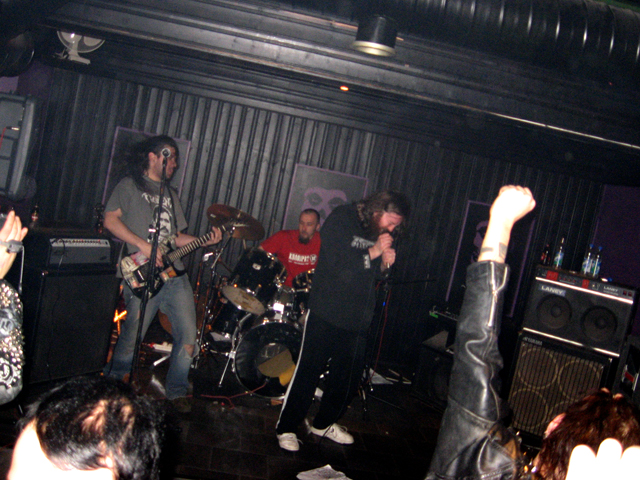
- Anal Cunt performing in Finland in 2007

Background information
- Also known as: AxCx; A.C.
- Origin: Newton, Massachusetts, U.S.
- Genre: Grindcore
- Years active: 1988–1990; 1991–2001; 2003–2011
- Labels: Relapse; Earache; Psychomania; Devour; Conquest; Menace to Sobriety; Wicked Sick; Limited Appeal; Patac
- Past members: Seth Putnam; Tim Morse; Josh Martin; Fred Ordonez; Paul Kraynak; Scott Hull; John Kozik; John Gillis; Nate Linehan; Mike Mahan; Florian Mahler

Anal Cunt, also called AxCx and A.C., was an American grindcore band that formed in Newton, Massachusetts, in 1988. From its inception, the band underwent a number of line-up changes and never had a bassist. The band, known for its flippant and noisy musical style as well as controversial lyrics, released eight full-length studio albums in addition to a number of compilations and extended plays. Anal Cunt disbanded in 2011 after the group's founder and frontman, Seth Putnam, died of a suspected heart attack.

The band is often referred to by their initials A.C. (often written as AxCx) due to the offensive nature of their name and censorship limits on some radio and publications, and many of their album covers simply display the initials A.C. However, the band managed to subvert even this abbreviation by drawing these letters in a manner resembling an anus and a vulva, which can be seen on most of their albums.

Putnam originally formed the band as a joke, and they intended to only record one demo and do one show; however, they were active up to 2011, despite several brief break-ups. The group's early material contained no pre-written lyrics or music and instead relied on improvised, loud, fast, unintelligible screaming. The band gradually incorporate more riffs and pre-written lyrics into their songs, as well as earned the reputation for being intentionally outrageous and obscene. 2010 and 2011 saw the release of their final two albums: a "cock rock" album titled Fuckin' A, and an album similar to their older material called Wearing Out Our Welcome.

== History ==
=== Formation in 1988 ===
Anal Cunt was founded on March 1, 1988 in Newton, Massachusetts (a city adjacent to Boston) by Seth Putnam, who had previously been a member of bands such as Executioner and Satan's Warriors. The name "Anal Cunt" came from Putnam's attempt "to get the most offensive, stupid, dumb, etc. name possible". A common misconception is that the band is named after the song "Anal Cunt" by GG Allin, but in fact Allin's song was written years after the band had started. The band did, however, later in their career render tribute to him by recording a version of "I'll Slice Your Fucking Throat (If You Fuck with Me)", originally recorded by Allin and the Murder Junkies.

Originally, the band was to produce a form of 'anti-music', without rhythm, beats, riffs, lyrics, song titles or any other of the normal features of a band, an approach exemplified by the 5643 Song EP.

=== Early performances and recordings and brief breakup (1988–1992) ===
The band's first performance was a rehearsal in 1988 at Putnam's mother's house in front of some family members, namely his mother, his two little brothers and his grandmother, as well as some of his mother's friends. Several other small performances followed, in various basements and living rooms, before their first public show live over the radio at Brandeis University, with Anal Cunt being the latest in the long line of Putnam's bands who had performed in this way. This was scheduled to be the band's first and last show. Putnam invited future member Fred Ordonez, from the band Shit Scum, to the show, but he failed to turn up. As a result, it was arranged for the two bands (Anal Cunt and Shit Scum) to play a concert together so Ordonez could see Putnam's band, and a further show was arranged at Shit Scum's rented practice warehouse. The first demo was recorded on a four-track in April in his mother's attic but this has never been mixed, released, or heard by anyone outside of the band members themselves.

After a few more shows, the band decided to attempt a U.S. tour, in August 1988, a few days before which they recorded their 47 Song Demo, which was later re-released on a compilation of the bands' material from the early years. They recorded their 88 Song EP later that year and after its release, a number of record labels started showing interest in the band, including Earache Records, with whom they would later sign a contract.

A few releases later, Earache Records again made an offer to the band, this time to license the 5643 Song EP for a European pressing (and later to buy the whole pressing), but Anal Cunt continued to turn down such offers. This was also the point where the band decided they had done as much as they could and decided to split up, after releasing Another EP and completing their first European tour. This tour was in April, and recordings from this tour are numerous, appearing on the compilations Fast Boston HC The Early Years and the bootlegs Harmonized Noise and the Anal Cunt/Patareni split.

Following appearances in a few other bands, including (recently reformed) George H. Brown (a blues rock act whose song "Foreplay with a Tree Shredder" would later be recorded by Anal Cunt for the album Top 40 Hits), From Sloth to Anger, and Post Mortem, Seth Putnam and Tim Morse decided to reform Anal Cunt on March 1, 1991, exactly three years after they had initially formed.

After the band's reformation, they decided they wanted to change their style to avoid getting bored again. The guitarist for the new, slightly more musical, Anal Cunt was originally supposed to be future member Paul Kraynak but ended up being Fred Ordonez, an ex-boxer. Some more EPs followed, including the world's first acoustic noisecore record, the Unplugged EP, before Putnam finally decided to introduce some elements of "real songs" into the band's material. Seth Putnam and Tim Morse tried out this idea in a six-song session in 1992, just before Putnam successfully auditioned for the reformed thrashcore band Siege, but it was a while before the plans were fully realized.

Later that year, Anal Cunt decided on another European tour. Despite the fact that Tim Morse pulled out at the last minute, the tour still went ahead, with the band deciding to find a drummer while they were touring. The two drummers who auditioned were not fast enough for the band, so Anal Cunt decided to have them both playing the same drum kit at the same time for the beginning of the tour, before resorting to just using the faster of the two. Most of the shows consisted of Putnam and Ordonez going into the crowd, punching people and destroying equipment, not only because of drunkenness but to conceal the fact that the drummer did not know their songs very well. This was also the tour that saw Putnam joining Fear of God on-stage as their drummer for one show and Putnam and Ordonez recording with Seven Minutes of Nausea.

On returning to the U.S., Anal Cunt decided to get a second guitarist who could carry on playing with the drummer during the violence and shouting. The choice was John Kozik, and with him came a new era of the band.

=== Sign to Earache (1993–2000) ===
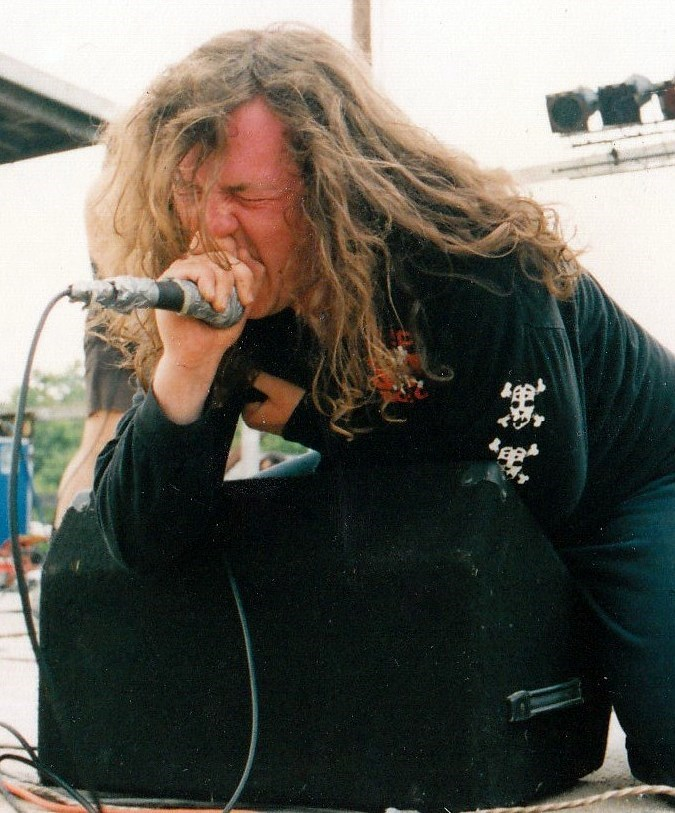
Vocalist Seth Putnam performing with Anal Cunt at the 1993 Relapse Festival

Although Anal Cunt had released a lot of material, their records were mostly out of print and hard to find, so they got in contact with Earache Records, which had previously shown an interest in the band. Anal Cunt wanted a label that would not only keep their records in stock but also pay for their tours, as the band at the time was operating essentially at a loss. Earache replied to Anal Cunt, asking to hear some new material. The band thereupon went into a studio in September to record what would later be released on Relapse Records as Morbid Florist. Fred Ordonez briefly quit, but was invited to rejoin after unsuccessful searches for a replacement and Earache Records decided to sign them.

Anal Cunt started recording their first album on the label, Everyone Should Be Killed, in March 1993. Soon afterwards, Ordonez was kicked out of the band for good and was replaced by Paul Kraynak. Recording was put on hold for a short West Coast tour in mid-1993, after which Kraynak too quit the band. This was also the tour when Putnam got arrested for hitting a woman in the face with a microphone in San Francisco during a show that, along with another show from earlier that year in Massachusetts, is documented on the EP Breaking the Law.

After some searching for a replacement for Kraynak, Anal Cunt decided to just stick with one guitarist, John Kozik. Following the release of Everyone Should Be Killed in 1994, the band did more tours, one in Europe and one immediately afterwards in the United States. The European tour encompassed Germany, Belgium, Spain and Austria, and Anal Cunt were supported by W.B.I. and the Necrophiliacs; on the American tour, they were joined by Incantation, Morpheus Descends, Afterlife and Gutted.

The transition from noise-style to fast-hardcore-style songs began in the fall of that year with the recording of their next album Top 40 Hits, which featured the single "Stayin' Alive (Oi! Version)".

Anal Cunt toured America again, and in June toured Japan for the first time. After this, Kozik was replaced by Scott Hull, of Pig Destroyer and Agoraphobic Nosebleed fame. With this line-up (or variations on it), the album 40 More Reasons to Hate Us was recorded. This album marked another change in the band's direction, with lyrics – and insults – being included in their songs for the first time.

Another two-week long tour with Eyehategod followed, but Hull refused to tour and was temporarily replaced by a returning Kozik after 3 shows and 10 months with the band. After this tour, the band was again close to breaking up (for the second time), but instead decided to shuffle the line-up once more. The problem seemed to be with Tim Morse, so he was kicked out of the band. Seth Putnam was now the only surviving original member of Anal Cunt.

The band was briefly on hiatus while Putnam put together a new line-up. The only thing they recorded during this time was the song "You're Gonna Need Someone On Your Side", for the Smiths tribute album The World Still Won't Listen, and the song "Two Turds and a Golf Ball" for the compilation CD of the same name, with Hull on guitar and Putnam performing drums and vocals. During this period, Putnam also did backing vocals for Pantera's The Great Southern Trendkill in New Orleans, and lead vocals for an Eyehategod show.

In January 1996, Putnam hired a new guitarist, Josh Martin. Martin was a student at New York University in 1994–1995, when Anal Cunt used to play in New York a lot, and they had become good friends. Indeed, this was a friendship that would continue, as Putnam and Martin would join forces later in Adolf Satan and acoustic black-metal band Impaled Northern Moonforest. Martin moved to Boston following his graduation, and was appointed by Putnam as the new Anal Cunt guitarist. After trying out a lot of drummers, they hired Nate Linehan. Martin wanted to join the band sooner but he was about to start his senior year of college and wasn't going to graduate until Spring

Yet another tour followed, this time with Incantation and Mortician. Anal Cunt then released their next full-length release, I Like It When You Die, which they had recorded prior to the tour. This album was essentially a collection of insults and featured the songs "You're Gay" and "Technology's Gay", as well as a guest appearance from Kyle Severn from Incantation. A lot of the songs refer to things being "gay", as this was a common slang word in Massachusetts and in junior-high schools across the United States at the time.

Following the tour, Linehan left the band and again activities were put on hold. Even so, Putnam and Martin recorded a few songs for a Black Sabbath tribute, In These Black Days Volume 1, which was a split with Eyehategod and featured Putnam on drums. A few months later, Putnam and Martin asked Linehan to rejoin the band and he agreed.

Another two tours later (the first in America with Murder One, the second in Japan), Anal Cunt recorded what would be their last album on Earache Records, It Just Gets Worse, which was released at the end of their 1999 European tour with Flächenbrand. The album was surrounded by much controversy: the label changed some of the song titles for legal reasons and also censored the lyrics to two of the songs.

In May 2000, Anal Cunt were dropped from Earache Records due to distributor problems.

=== Second breakup, reformation, and 20th anniversary (2000–2009) ===
Despite being dropped by their label (although Earache did later make them an offer to come back, which they turned down) and Linehan leaving again in September 1999, Anal Cunt continued on, now with John Gillis on drums. Some more touring and a few releases followed, such as the Defenders of the Hate EP and a split 7-inch with Flachenbrand (who had opened for AC on their 1999 German tour). There was also a Defenders of the Hate tour in 2001, featuring two legs: one to California and back in June, and one to Texas and back in September. The band released a limited tour edition of the record as part of the tour. Anal Cunt issued an official press release at the end of December 2001 saying that they had broken up again. This time, the band seemed to have permanently disbanded, with only a few compilation tracks and the Very Rare Rehearsal from February 1989 CD being released.

During a show in 2000 in Providence, Rhode Island, Dropdead opened for Anal Cunt, but when Anal Cunt took the stage, Putnam began insulting Bob Otis from Dropdead, and eventually the audience, throwing out racial slurs and performing Nazi salutes; Otis eventually got on stage and knocked Putnam off the stage, and a fight broke out.

In March, 2003 they did two 15-year anniversary shows. Mike Mahan came back on guitar but Florian Mahler played drums at those shows instead of original drummer Tim Morse. They did stuff from the 1988–1990 band period.

Anal Cunt reformed in August 2003 with the lineup of Putnam, Martin and Linehan. However, after one practice, Martin was forced to leave the band, due to him going to jail. Putnam brought John Kozik back to replace him. After a few gigs in late 2003 (including one opening for Superjoint Ritual) and a short Japan tour in January 2004 with Napalm Death, Nasum, and Pig Destroyer, Linehan left the band yet again. He was again replaced by John Gillis.

In October 2004, Putnam went into a coma for nearly a month as a result of a drug overdose. Initially reported as a sleeping pill overdose for legal reasons, he later claimed it was a combination of alcohol, crack, heroin, and a bottle of sleeping pills. Doctors thought that even if he survived, he would suffer permanent serious brain damage and were intending to "pull the plug", before Putnam's mother intervened. Even after coming out of the coma, Putnam was now paralyzed and had sustained severe nerve damage, needing months of physical therapy to recover. For the first show that Anal Cunt played following this coma (with Eyehategod), Putnam had to remain seated in a chair throughout. Putnam said he would continue to play songs such as "You're in a Coma" and had promised that the band would release new material.

After a festival appearance in Norway in 2006, at which Putnam completely passed out on stage and was unconscious for the entire gig, both Kozik and Gillis quit the band. Martin (now out of jail) soon returned to the band and got Linehan to return as well. Anal Cunt released the Defenders of the Hate full-length CD in 2007, which featured bonus out-of-print tracks, such as those from the 13 Bands Who Think You're Gay and Thrash of the Titans compilations, as well as the tracks from the split with Flächenbrand. Other releases that had been promised included a sequel to Picnic of Love (Picnic of Love II) and an Anal Cunt/Gay Bar split, featuring unreleased Anal Cunt material from the Putnam/Martin/Linehan era on one side and a recording of Seth Putnam in a gay bar on the other. These albums were never recorded. The Defenders of the Hate re-release sparked another tour in March 2007 which included an appearance at the Los Angeles Murderfest Version 3.0 on March 24, 2007. with Accused, Brutal Truth, Pig Destroyer, and others, and a UK festival appearance later that year.

2008 was the 20th anniversary of the band, so Putnam celebrated it with several original lineup reunion shows with Tim Morse and Mike Mahan. By this point Linehan had yet again left the band, and Martin was again in jail. They played shows in Boston, Texas, and the West Coast. On November 17, 2008, the original Anal Cunt line-up (Seth Putnam, Mike Mahan, and Tim Morse) finished recording their 110 Song CD. The album was made as a celebration of the band's 20-year anniversary. The album's musical style is the same as Anal Cunt's early noisecore style.

After the original lineup reunion was over, Morse decided to stay on as the permanent drummer. Martin also returned. In early 2009 the Old Stuff Part 3 CD was released, featuring all the non-Earache tracks recorded by the Putnam, Martin and Linehan lineup in the 1990s. This sparked another round of touring. In 2009 AC played all over the US, plus a short tour of Norway in October. Also in 2009, Anal Cunt recorded their next two albums.

=== New material, Putnam's death, and permanent dissolution (2010–2011) ===
In April 2010, Putnam announced that the new album was almost completed. The album was delayed due to Josh Martin being in jail (for a third time). The lead guitar tracks were recorded when he was released. On May 11, 2010, Putnam announced that the band decided to split the new recording into two albums. The "cock rock songs" would be released on an album called Fuckin' A in a style similar to that of Mötley Crüe's debut Too Fast for Love, and the noisegrind songs would be released on an album called Wearing Out Our Welcome, which would also feature backing vocals from members of the Raunchous Brothers, Vaginal Jesus, and Mudoven. On June 22, 2010, Putnam completed Fuckin' A. The songs "Fuck Yeah" and "Cranking My Band's Demo on a Box at the Beach" were released on MySpace Music. On June 24, 2010, Seth Putnam announced on the Anal Cunt Myspace blog that guitarist Josh Martin "is out of A.C.". Putnam continued by stating that the band would play and record as a two-piece outfit. Fuckin' A was released on January 11, 2011. At the same time, it was announced that Josh Martin was once again back in Anal Cunt, after only two shows performed as a two-piece. In April 2011 Anal Cunt embarked on what would be their final tour. The last show was on April 30, 2011, in Cleveland.

On June 11, 2011, the band's frontman and founder Seth Putnam died of a suspected heart attack, ending the band.

A compilation CD of obscure Anal Cunt releases was announced in 2009 and was planned to be released by Wicked Sick Records (Seth Putnam's label). In October 2011 it was announced to be a two-CD set entitled The Old Testament. It is a re-release of The Early Years 1988–1991 with a new cover, liner notes penned by Putnam, the band's first demo (which was never before heard by anyone outside Anal Cunt and two girls that visited Putnam's house and were in the room when the recording was made), and tracks from Anal Cunt's final rehearsal session in 1991. It was released in November 2011 by Relapse Records.

Former guitarist Josh Martin died on May 28, 2018, after accidentally falling off an escalator and hitting his head on a table at the Providence Place mall in Rhode Island.

In 2020, Morse and Ordonez formed Burt Bacharach, a grindcore duo with a similar style to early AxCx but with radical left-wing lyrics.

== Artistry ==
=== Musical style and classification ===
Anal Cunt has been categorized as grindcore, noisecore, noisegrind and hardcore.

=== Lyrical themes ===
Anal Cunt were often cited as having common lyrical themes that include misogyny, homophobia, Nazism, antisemitism, racism, politics, criticism of popular culture, and ridicule of the unfortunate, although this has not always been the case. Many of these songs included insults and/or targets, either general or specific to one person; examples include African Americans, Jewish people, homosexuals, foreigners, victims of HIV/AIDS, rape, suicide, homicide, and child abuse, school students, musicians, actors, and the citizens of Allston.

The album I Like It When You Die developed the idea of containing insults in their songs, with a recurring song title being "X Is Gay", with examples including "You're Gay", "Technology's Gay", "Recycling Is Gay", "The Internet Is Gay", "Windchimes Are Gay" and even "The Word 'Homophobic' Is Gay". Another recurring song title is "You X", with examples including "You Own a Store", "You Live in a Houseboat", "You Are an Orphan", "You Go to Art School", and "You Keep a Diary". The band even parodied this theme with the songs "You (Fill in the Blank)" and "I'm in Anal Cunt".

The 1999 album It Just Gets Worse took the idea of intentional offense a step further with more extreme examples of racism and sexism. Examples include "You're Pregnant So I Kicked You in the Stomach", "I Lit Your Baby on Fire" and "Women: Nature's Punching Bag". The lyrics to two of the songs on this album were altered, and one of the songs on this album had its name changed from "Conor Clapton Committed Suicide Because His Father Sucks" to "Your Kid Committed Suicide Because You Suck", because they were working for a record label in Britain, where libel laws are very stringent. Another song on the album called "Easy E Got Aids from F Mercury" contains the lyrics "Now Freddie's dead and he's in heaven; at his wake you ate watermelon". The album's lyric sheet is also sometimes censored with a mock "Parental Advisory: Explicit Content" sticker that says "Anal Cunt: Fucking Offensive"; it's placed 7 times on the sheet. Similarly, on the album cover there's another mock sticker that says "Parental Advisory: AC Lyrics".

It was also on It Just Gets Worse that the band began to include references to the Holocaust in their songs, including "I Sent Concentration Camp Footage to America's Funniest Home Videos", "Body by Auschwitz" and "Hitler Was a Sensitive Man". This theme of seemingly glorifying Adolf Hitler and his actions continued on their subsequent EPs, with songs such as "I'm Hitler", "I Went Back in Time and Voted for Hitler" and "Ha Ha Holocaust".

Another common lyrical theme in the band's material was that of insulting other bands, or music in general. Such examples include the song titles "Rancid Sucks (and The Clash Sucked Too)", "Limp Bizkit Think They're Black, but They're Just Gay", "Anyone Who Likes the Dillinger Escape Plan Is a Faggot" and "311 Sucks".

Next to this offensive material, some of their other songs were deliberately much more light-hearted, which was done to self-parody. This includes the satirical Picnic of Love album, and also covers of songs completely different from their style including "Can't Touch This", "Stayin' Alive", "Escape", "Electric Avenue", "The Theme From Three's Company", "You're Gonna Need Someone on Your Side", "Hungry Hungry Hippos", and "Just the Two of Us", as well as their karaoke rendition of the Steve Miller Band song "Abracadabra" (intended to be a "cover" of "Sabbra Cadabra" by Black Sabbath). On their "Another E.P" 7 inch they covered "Goon" by Goon and Riverbottom Nightmare Band from The Muppets. They also played snippets of "Why Not Try Suicide" by P.T.L Klub, "Religious Vomit" by Dead Kennedys, "Breaking The Law" by Judas Priest and had even covered Pantera's titular first track on The Great Southern Trendkill in one of their later EPs.

Critic Steve Huey called their album Morbid Florist "barely listenable". Seth Putnam admitted that he had sent copies of the band's work to publications because he knew it would get negative reviews from authors.

== Legacy ==
Following the death of vocalist Seth Putnam in 2011 Tom Breihan of Pitchfork wrote on the band stating "Anal Cunt became notorious for their brief, throat-shred songs, their confrontational live shows, their constantly-shifting lineups, and, more than anything else, their song titles, almost all of which were intentionally offensive to ridiculous degrees." Pantera has cited Anal Cunt as one of their influences.

In Q magazine's 2005 book The Greatest Rock & Pop Miscellany Ever!, Anal Cunt was included in a list of "25 Band Names That Should Have Stayed on the Drawing Board". In 2021, Mike Rampton of Kerrang named Anal Cunt as the "most offensive band name of all time."

In 2013 a tribute album titled Defenders of the Noise - A Tribute to Anal Cunt was released and features Anal Cunt covers by 26 different grindcore bands.

In 2014 Phil Anselmo in collaboration with Child Bite released a 5-inch EP called Morbid Hits which includes covers of five Anal Cunt songs from Morbid Florist EP.

== Band members ==
=== Final lineup ===
- Seth Putnam – vocals, guitars (1988–1990, 1991–2001, 2003–2011; died 2011)
- Tim Morse – drums, backing vocals (1988–1990, 1991–1996, 2008–2011)
- Josh Martin – guitars, backing vocals (1996–2001, 2003, 2006–2011; died 2018)

=== Previous members ===
- Mike Mahan – guitars (1988–1990, 1998, 2003, 2008)
- Fred Ordonez – guitars (1991–1992, 1992–1993)
- John Kozik – guitars (1992–1995, 1995, 2003–2006)
- Paul Kraynak – guitars (1993, 1995)
- Scott Hull – guitars (1995)
- Nate Linehan – drums (1996–1999, 2003–2004, 2006–2007)
- John Gillis – drums (1999–2001, 2004–2006)
- Florian Mahler – drums (2003)

== Discography ==
- Everyone Should Be Killed (1994)
- Top 40 Hits (1995)
- 40 More Reasons to Hate Us (1996)
- I Like It When You Die (1997)
- Picnic of Love (1998)
- It Just Gets Worse (1999)
- Defenders of the Hate (2001)
- 110 Song CD (2008)
- Fuckin' A (2010)
- Wearing Out Our Welcome (2011)
