= Terrifyer =

Studio album by Pig Destroyer
- Released: October 12, 2004
- Recorded: August 2002 – July 2004
- Studios: Brian Harvey's home Visceralsound (Bethesda, Maryland)
- Genre: Grindcore
- Length: 32:16
- Label: Relapse
- Producer: Scott Hull

Pig Destroyer chronology
| Painter of Dead Girls (2004) | Terrifyer (2004) | Pig Destroyer / Coldworker / Antigama split (2007) |

Professional ratings
Review scores
| Source | Rating |
|---|---|
| AllMusic | 4.5/5 stars |
| Collector's Guide to Heavy Metal | 8/10 |
| Lambgoat | 9/10 stars |
| PopMatters | positive |
| Punknews.org | 4/5 stars |

Terrifyer is the third studio album by American grindcore band Pig Destroyer. It was released in 2004 by Relapse Records. The album deals with feelings of limerence, lust, and obsession with an unnamed woman that the narrator claims is responsible for his suffering.

The album includes a second disc recorded in DVD-Audio and mixed with 5.1 surround sound. The disc contains the band's near-40 minute sludge metal song "Natasha". The Japanese release of Terrifyer includes four bonus tracks and "Natasha" as a second CD instead of a DVD. "Natasha" was reissued on a regular CD as a separate release in 2008. The album booklet features a six-page story of how Natasha became the "Terrifyer". Some copies of Terrifyer were released with a slip of paper on the cover to hide the artwork.

In 2017, Rolling Stone ranked Terrifyer as 88th on their list of "The 100 Greatest Metal Albums of All Time". "Gravedancer" appeared on the Tony Hawk's American Wasteland soundtrack as a cut down version, cutting the sample at the end.

== Track listing ==
All lyrics are written by J. R. Hayes.

Disc one
| No. | Title | Length |
|---|---|---|
| 1. | "Intro" | 0:41 |
| 2. | "Pretty in Casts" | 1:16 |
| 3. | "Boy Constrictor" | 0:58 |
| 4. | "Scarlet Hourglass" | 0:57 |
| 5. | "Thumbsucker" | 1:33 |
| 6. | "Gravedancer" | 3:01 |
| 7. | "Lost Cause" | 0:54 |
| 8. | "Sourheart" | 0:53 |
| 9. | "Towering Flesh" | 3:35 |
| 10. | "Song of Filth" | 0:41 |
| 11. | "Verminess" | 1:16 |
| 12. | "Torture Ballad" | 1:21 |
| 13. | "Restraining Order Blues" | 1:32 |
| 14. | "Carrion Fairy" | 2:30 |
| 15. | "Downpour Girl" | 1:30 |
| 16. | "Soft Assassin" | 1:27 |
| 17. | "Dead Carnations" | 1:30 |
| 18. | "Crippled Horses" | 1:34 |
| 19. | "The Gentleman" | 1:23 |
| 20. | "Crawl of Time" | 1:30 |
| 21. | "Terrifyer" | 2:12 |
| 22. | "Dress in Gasoline" (Japanese bonus track) | 1:56 |
| 23. | "The Cutting Room" (Japanese bonus track) | 0:51 |
| 24. | "Blurface" (Japanese bonus track) | 0:48 |
| 25. | "Doomspell" (Japanese bonus track) | 2:18 |

Disc two (Japanese version)
| No. | Title | Length |
|---|---|---|
| 1. | "Natasha" | 37:55 |

DVD
| No. | Title | Length |
|---|---|---|
| 1. | "Natasha" (DVD-Audio) | 37:55 |

== Accolades ==
| Publication | Accolade | Rank | Ref. |
|---|---|---|---|
| Kerrang! | Kerrang! Albums Of The Year 2004 | 15 | |
| Loudwire | 10 Best Metal Albums of 2004 | 8 | |
| Loudwire | Top 100 Hard Rock and Heavy Metal Albums of the 21st Century | 51 | |
| Loudwire | Top 25 Extreme Metal Albums of All Time | 25 | |
| Rolling Stone | The 100 Greatest Metal Albums of All Time | 88 | |
| Treblezine | Treble's Top 100 Metal Albums | 46 | |

== Personnel ==
- Brian Harvey – drums
- J. R. Hayes – vocals, design
- Scott Hull – guitars, bass ("Natasha"), engineering, production, mastering
- Matthew Mills – solo ("Towering Flesh")
- Richard "Grindfather" Johnson – vocals ("Crawl of Time")
- Katherine Katz – vocals ("Lost Cause")
- Chris Taylor – art
- Jonathan Canady – design
- Matthew F. Jacobson – executive production
