= It Just Gets Worse =

Studio album by Anal Cunt
- Released: November 9, 1999
- Recorded: August 1998 – August 1999
- Genre: Grindcore
- Length: 32:15
- Label: Earache

Anal Cunt chronology
Picnic of Love (1998)	It Just Gets Worse (1999)	Live in N.Y.C. (1999)

Professional ratings
Review scores
Source	Rating
Allmusic	2.5/5 stars
Metal Underground	3/5 stars

It Just Gets Worse is the sixth album by the grindcore band Anal Cunt, released on November 9, 1999, on Earache Records.

== Background ==
The album was recorded between August 1998 and August 1999 (except tracks 38 and 39 which were recorded and mixed in August 1997), although the majority of it was recorded after the band's 1998 tour in Japan. The guitar and drums were recorded on a 4-track at Anal Cunt's practice space and the vocals were recorded on a PA in the studio, where vocalist Seth Putnam mixed it. The album was then released after their 1999 European tour with the band Flächenbrand and was the last of the band's albums released under the Earache label which they got dropped from in May 2000. "Your Kid Committed Suicide Because You Suck" was originally titled "Conor Clapton Committed Suicide Because His Father Sucks". "Chris Barnes Is a Pussy" was based on an alleged incident that involved Putnam being attacked by Six Feet Under's roadies, while their vocalist Chris Barnes fled to his tour bus after a scuffle between the two.

== Track listing ==
No.	Title	Writer(s)	Length
1.	"I Became a Counselor So I Could Tell Rape Victims They Asked for It"	Linehan, Martin, Putnam	0:43
2.	"Easy E Got A.I.D.S. from F. Mercury"	Martin, Putnam	0:42
3.	"I Like Drugs and Child Abuse"	Martin, Putnam	0:22
4.	"Laughing While Leonard Peltier Gets Raped in Prison"	Martin, Putnam	0:41
5.	"I Convinced You to Beat Your Wife on a Daily Basis"	Putnam	0:51
6.	"I Sent Concentration Camp Footage to America's Funniest Home Videos"	Martin, Putnam	0:34
7.	"Rancid Sucks (And The Clash Sucked Too)"	Martin, Putnam	0:40
8.	"I Paid J. Howell to Rape You"	Martin, Putnam	1:44
9.	"I Pushed Your Wife in Front of the Subway"	Martin, Putnam	0:46
10.	"Extreme Noise Terror Are Afraid of Us"	Martin, Putnam	0:29
11.	"You Rollerblading Faggot"	Putnam	0:31
12.	"I Sent a Thank You Card to the Guy Who Raped You"	Putnam	0:29
13.	"I Lit Your Baby on Fire"	Putnam	1:56
14.	"Body by Auschwitz"	Coughlin, Martin, Putnam	1:02
15.	"I Intentionally Ran Over Your Dog"	Martin, Putnam	0:30
16.	"Sweatshops Are Cool"	Martin, Putnam	0:47
17.	"Women: Nature's Punching Bag"	Martin, Putnam	0:57
18.	"I Snuck a Retard into a Sperm Bank"	Putnam	0:30
19.	"Your Kid Committed Suicide Because You Suck"	Putnam	1:02
20.	"I Ate Your Horse"	Martin, Putnam	0:50
21.	"Hitler Was a Sensitive Man"	Martin, Putnam	0:49
22.	"You Robbed a Sperm Bank Because You're a Cum Guzzling Fag"	Martin, Putnam	0:28
23.	"I Made Your Kid Get AIDS So You Could Watch It Die"	Putnam	0:53
24.	"I Fucked Your Wife"	Martin, Putnam	0:40
25.	"Into the Oven"	Putnam	1:42
26.	"I Gave NAMBLA Pictures of Your Kid"	Martin, Putnam	0:52
27.	"The Only Reason Men Talk to You Is Because They Want to Get Laid, You Stupid Fucking Cunt"	Martin, Putnam	1:02
28.	"I Made Fun of You Because Your Kid Just Died"	Martin, Putnam	0:28
29.	"Domestic Violence Is Really, Really, Really Funny"	Putnam	0:42
30.	"Dictators Are Cool"	Martin, Putnam	0:35
31.	"Deadbeat Dads Are Cool"	Putnam	0:43
32.	"I'm Really Excited About the Upcoming David Buskin Concert"	Martin, Putnam	0:45
33.	"Being Ignorant Is Awesome"	Putnam	1:03
34.	"You're Pregnant, So I Kicked You in the Stomach"	Martin, Putnam	0:28
35.	"Chris Barnes Is a Pussy"	Martin, Putnam	1:04
36.	"Tim Is Gay"	Martin, Putnam	1:30
37.	"BT/AC"	Anal Cunt	0:41
38.	"I Sold Your Dog to a Chinese Restaurant"	Putnam	0:49
39.	"I Got an Office Job for the Sole Purpose of Sexually Harassing Women"	Martin, Putnam	0:58

== Personnel ==
Anal Cunt

- Seth Putnam – vocals
- Josh Martin – guitar
- Nate Linehan – drums, backing vocals (39)

Additional musicians

- Choke (Slapshot) – backing vocals (1–3, 5, 7, 8, 9, 13, 16, 18, 19, 21–24, 26–29, 31, 34, 36)
- Anal Cunt Gestapo – backing vocals (5, 21, 35, 36)
