= Kevin Mahoney =

American singer

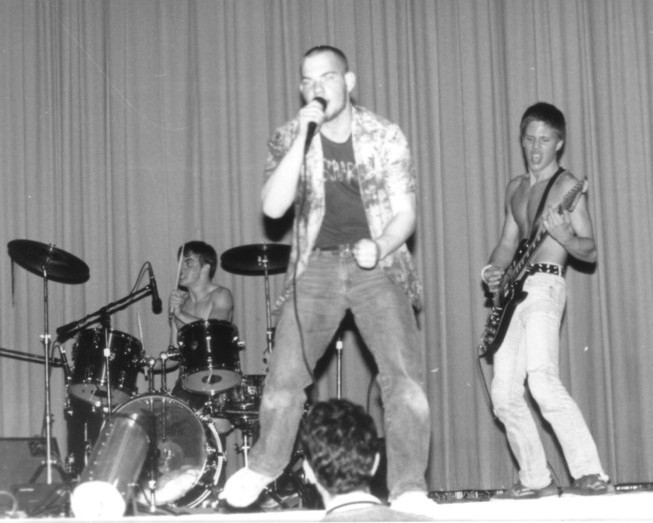
- Mahoney (center) with Siege bandmates in 1984

Background information
- Born: Kevin J. Mahoney; September 6, 1965; Massachusetts, United States
- Died: October 14, 2011 (aged 46) Stoughton, Massachusetts, United States
- Genres: Hardcore punk, grindcore, powerviolence
- Occupation: Musician
- Instruments: Vocals, saxophone
- Years active: 1981–1985, 2006–2008
- Labels: Relapse Records, Deep Six Records

Kevin J. Mahoney (September 6, 1965 – October 14, 2011) was an American singer. He is best remembered as the vocalist of Siege, a pioneering Massachusetts-based hardcore punk band whose speed and discord influenced the formation of the grindcore and powerviolence subgenres of punk rock and heavy metal. Mahoney's incongruous lead vocal style also influenced the development of these genres.

Mahoney was a member of Siege from 1983 to 1985, their main productive years. He also led the group The Spoils with Siege drummer Rob Williams from 2006 to 2008.

== Biography ==
=== Early years ===
Mahoney grew up in Braintree, Massachusetts. He had two sisters, Keren and Kathy, the latter his twin. Keren's husband Rick Jones was a member of the Boston-area hardcore punk band Jerry's Kids, an influential early Boston hardcore group. Prior to joining Siege, Mahoney played in a ska band.

=== Siege ===
In 1983, Mahoney joined guitarist Kurt Habelt, drummer Rob Williams, and bassist Hank McNamee, all from nearby Weymouth, to form Siege. Siege played an extreme style of hardcore punk, combining exceptionally fast tempos with Mahoney's screeching and howling vocals. In addition to serving as the band's lead vocalist, Mahoney occasionally played saxophone with the group, creating an additional layer of noisy texture in the band's chaotic sound. Siege recorded a demo cassette and three tracks released on the Cleanse the Bacteria compilation, and performed throughout New England over the next few years. They disbanded in 1985 when Mahoney failed to attend their first gig in New York City, which was subsequently canceled.

Although the band wrote only 20 minutes of music and never played outside of New England, they achieved significant posthumous fame. The group is now cited as a catalyst of the grindcore and powerviolence genres, and has influenced such noteworthy bands as Napalm Death, Carcass, and Dropdead. After years of being bootlegged, their recorded output was officially released by Relapse Records as the Drop Dead album in 1994.

=== Later activity, The Spoils ===
Mahoney did not participate in the brief Siege reunion in 1991. He began working in information technology in the Brigham and Women's Hospital in Boston in 1992, and remained there for over a decade. He later worked in a similar capacity at the Boston Children's Hospital. He also was active in theater in Cambridge.

He and Williams later formed the punk band The Spoils along with Cotie Cowgill of Williams's post-Siege band Nightstick and several other musicians. The group's sole release was the album ...To the Victor on Deep Six Records in 2008. They disbanded shortly after the album was issued.

Mahoney was also an accomplished playwright and poet. His play The Day God Moved to Scotland premiered with Catbox Cabaret at The Cantab Lounge Downstairs in 1993. He would spend the next couple of years as one of their principle playwrights eventually stepping on the stage as an actor in the titular role in Doug O'Keefe's Sparky. As Catbox moved on from Boston, Kevin became a fixture at the Boston Poetry Slam which also began at The Cantab Lounge.

=== Death ===
Mahoney died suddenly on October 14, 2011, due to complications of diabetes mellitus. He was living in Stoughton, Massachusetts at the time. Numerous prominent heavy metal and punk rock musicians mourned his death in the media, including members of Napalm Death, Agoraphobic Nosebleed, Eyehategod, and Soilent Green.
