= Phantom Limb (album) =

Studio album by Pig Destroyer
- Released: June 12, 2007
- Recorded: Omega Studios In Rockville, Maryland
- Genre: Deathgrind
- Length: 38:45
- Label: Relapse
- Producer: Scott Hull

Pig Destroyer chronology
Pig Destroyer / Coldworker / Antigama split (2007)	Phantom Limb (2007)	Natasha (2008)

Professional ratings
Review scores
Source	Rating
About.com	4.5/5 stars
Allmusic	4.5/5 stars
Collector's Guide to Heavy Metal	9/10
Decibel Magazine	favorable
Lambgoat	9/10
Pitchfork	8.6/10
Punknews.org	4.5/5 stars

Phantom Limb is the fourth studio album by the band Pig Destroyer, released on June 12, 2007 in the United States and June 18 in the rest of the world. The album was released on CD and LP. Vocalist JR Hayes said the 14 songs are "the most deranged metal songs we could come up with". The album cover art was done by John Baizley.

== Track listing ==
All lyrics are written by J. R. Hayes.

No.	Title	Length
1.	"Rotten Yellow"	1:40
2.	"Jupiter’s Eye"	1:29
3.	"Deathtripper"	1:04
4.	"Thought Crime Spree"	2:17
5.	"Cemetery Road"	0:50
6.	"Lesser Animal"	1:12
7.	"Phantom Limb"	1:38
8.	"Loathsome"	4:04
9.	"Heathen Temple"	3:30
10.	"4th Degree Burns"	1:28
11.	"Alexandria"	3:03
12.	"Girl in the Slayer Jacket"	3:26
13.	"Waist Deep in Ash"	2:36
14.	"The Machete Twins"	3:02
15.	Untitled	7:26
Total length:		38:45

== Personnel ==
Pig Destroyer

- J. R. Hayes – vocals
- Scott Hull – guitar, mixing, production
- Brian Harvey – drums
- Blake Harrison – samples, ambience

Production

- Matthew F. Jacobson – executive producer
- Orion Landau – artwork, design
- John Baizley – cover art
- Shannon Follin – engineer
