= Executioner (band) =

American thrash metal band

- Origin: Boston, Massachusetts, U.S.
- Genres: Thrash metal
- Years active: 1984–1990
- Labels: New Renaissance Records
- Past members: Marc Johnson; Dan Scannell; Seth Putnam; Ari Vainio; Tommy Flynn

Executioner was an American thrash metal band from Boston, Massachusetts, that was active from 1984 to 1990.

== History ==
Executioner was formed in 1984 by guitarist/vocalist Marc Johnson, bassist/vocalist Ari Vainio, and drummer Dan Scannell. Their track "Victims of Evil" was included on the New Renaissance Records' compilation album, Speed Metal Hell, in 1985. They were then signed to New Renaissance Records and recorded material throughout 1985, which was then collectively released as their debut album, In the Name of Metal in 1986.

In the band's early years, Executioner played many concerts in the Boston, Massachusetts-area. Marc Johnson promoted a number of shows at the YWCA Hall where the band played with local Punk and Heavy metal acts, including GangGreen, The Freeze, and Straw Dogs (aka, The F.U.'s), as well as bands from out-of-town, including Scream, Corrosion of Conformity, and Verbal Assault. Executioner also performed at local clubs where the band opened for Megadeth and Manowar.

In the summer of 1986, the band toured to support the In the Name of Metal release with Seth Putnam as a roadie, but the strain of touring on a low budget forced the band to abruptly end the tour in Texas, cancelling all remaining shows. Soon after, Ari Vainio left the band.

Greg Dellaria briefly joined the band and the lineup played a number of dates throughout the northeast with California Alternative Group, Dr. Know. Later that year, Dellaria left the band and was replaced by Seth Putnam. In early 1987, the band recorded the Break the Silence album. They went on a successful nationwide tour in support of Break the Silence and played with bands such as The Accüsed, Voivod, Kreator, Nuclear Assault, St. Vitus, Dream Death, The Mentors, and Dirty Rotten Imbeciles.

In May 1988, Putnam left the band and was replaced very briefly by Eric Harrison. The band never played live with Harrison, but Harrison did create the band's final logo, as later seen on the 1999 release The Storm After the Calm.

Harrison was succeeded by Tommy Flynn. The lineup played shows in Worcester, Massachusetts, and became internationally-known by bringing the show to Montreal, Canada. With Flynn, Executioner recorded material throughout 1988, and most of 1989. But, shortly after the material was mixed, the band broke up. Had Executioner not broken up, the material would have been organized into an album entitled In Cold Blood and released in 1990.

In 1999, a CD called The Storm After the Calm, containing the tracks from the sessions in 1988 and 1989, as well as four live tracks, was posthumously released.

In 2013, In the Name of Metal was reissued on CD by Old Metal Records, run by King Fowley, from the group Deceased, with bonus tracks including "Final Destruction" (previously only available on the cassette version of the original release), the original recording of "Victims of Evil", and a live record of AC/DC's "Walk All Over You" from The Storm After the Calm. Later that year, Old Metal Records released Break the Silence on CD without any bonus material.

== Discography ==
- In the Name of Metal (1986)
- Break the Silence (1987)
- The Storm after the Calm (1999)
