= Pig Destroyer =

American grindcore band

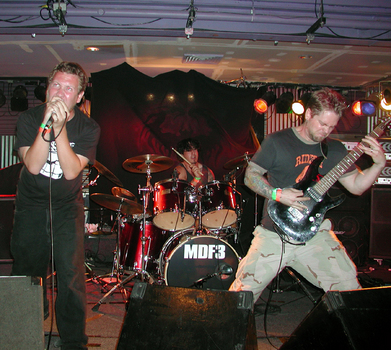
- Pig Destroyer in 2005. Left to right: J. R. Hayes, Brian Harvey, Scott Hull.

Background information
- Origin: Alexandria, Virginia, U.S.
- Genres: Grindcore; deathgrind
- Years active: 1997–present
- Label: Relapse
- Members: J. R. Hayes; Scott Hull; Adam Jarvis; Travis Stone; Alex Cha
- Past members: John Evans; Donna Parker; Jessica Rylan; Brian Harvey; John Jarvis; Blake Harrison
- Website: pig-destroyer.com

Pig Destroyer is an American grindcore band formed in 1997 in Alexandria, Virginia. The band was formed by vocalist J. R. Hayes, guitarist Scott Hull and drummer John Evans. Pig Destroyer is one of the most well-known grindcore bands due to Hayes' poetic lyrics, Hull's incorporation of thrash metal, doom metal and punk influences in songwriting, and Harvey's technical drum work.

== History ==
The band formed in 1997 after the break-up of a short-lived political hardcore band, Treblinka, with 2 former members of said band, vocalist J. R. Hayes (Enemy Soil), guitarist Scott Hull (Agoraphobic Nosebleed, Japanese Torture Comedy Hour, ex-Anal Cunt), and drummer John Evans, who left the band for an unspecified school not long after the band's formation. After the departure of Evans, he was soon replaced by Brian Harvey.

In an interview, Scott Hull claims that they picked the band name on the criteria that it was insulting, yet somewhat more creative than the name of his last band, Anal Cunt. Deciding that "Cop Killer" or "Cop Destroyer" would be tactless, they eventually settled on "Pig Destroyer" ("pig" being a pejorative American slang term for the police). Derived from a non-musical source as extreme as the band's sound, Pig Destroyer's easily identifiable logo was created using a graphic from ANSWER Me! magazine as a template. Relapse Records signed the band and issued a split 7-inch with Isis on the label's Singles Series. 38 Counts of Battery was a complete discography of Pig Destroyer releases up to the year 2000, which included split records with Gnob and influential screamo act Orchid, as well as their debut album, Explosions in Ward 6, and the demo that secured their record deal.

Prowler in the Yard, released in 2001, was the first of the band's records to really break through to what could contextually be considered the "mainstream". Garnering rave reviews from popular press such as Kerrang! and Terrorizer, the record earned Pig Destroyer headlining slots at the 2002 New England Metal and Hardcore Festival and the 2002 Relapse Records CMJ Showcase, as well as a high placing at 2003's Relapse Contamination Fest alongside scene legends High on Fire and The Dillinger Escape Plan (documented on the Relapse Contamination Fest DVD).

2004's Terrifyer boasted a much clearer sound than Prowler in the Yard or 38 Counts of Battery, as well as lyrics and prose from Hayes. The record came with an accompanying DVD soundscape entitled "Natasha", which was intended to be listened to in surround sound (although a more recent Japanese edition of the album has "Natasha" as an ordinary CD with four bonus tracks). Session guitarist Matthew Kevin Mills, Hull's former guitar teacher, recorded the lead guitar parts in the song "Towering Flesh".

A compilation of tracks from the split EPs with Gnob and Benümb is also available, entitled Painter of Dead Girls. The album features alternative versions of older songs from the 38 Counts era (such as "Dark Satellites"), a series of new songs (such as "Rejection Fetish" and "Forgotten Child"), and covers of bands who could be considered an influence (such as The Stooges and Helmet).

In late 2006, Blake Harrison officially joined Pig Destroyer as sound designer providing samples and noise. He had previously helped the band with merch on the Grind Over UK tour in early 2004.

2007 saw the release of album Phantom Limb via Relapse Records, complete with album artwork designed by John Baizley (Baroness, Torche).

In 2011, Harvey was replaced by Misery Index drummer Adam Jarvis. Prior to Jarvis joining the band, Pig Destroyer had rehearsed with Dave Witte several times before an injury and touring commitments with Municipal Waste led him to step aside.

Book Burner was released on October 22, 2012. Pig Destroyer headlined the Terrorizer stage at the Damnation Festival in Leeds in November 2012, which marked their first United Kingdom show in eight years.

In March 2013, Pig Destroyer released an EP titled Mass & Volume via Bandcamp. Recorded at the end of the Phantom Limb sessions, this EP was released as part of a charity effort to benefit the family of recently deceased Relapse Records employee Pat Egen. In September 2013, Adult Swim released the song "The Octagonal Stairway" as part of the 2013 Adult Swim Singles Series.

In October 2013, Adam Jarvis's cousin John Jarvis joined Pig Destroyer as the band's first bass player. In 2014, "The Diplomat" was featured prominently in the season finale of Comedy Central's TV show Workaholics. In 2015, Relapse announced a deluxe reissue of the band's 2001 album Prowler In The Yard, which featured a remixed & remastered version of the album in various limited formats.

At least seven official promotional videos have been made of Pig Destroyer songs: "Piss Angel", from Prowler in the Yard; "Gravedancer", from Terrifyer; "Loathsome", from Phantom Limb; "The Diplomat", from Book Burner; "Army of Cops", "The Torture Fields", and "Mt. Skull" from Head Cage. The first three have aired on MTV2's Headbangers Ball, with each video seeing more airplay than the one that was released before it. The video for "Piss Angel" debuted on the show on August 14, 2004, and was directed by Kenneth Thibault and Nathaniel Baruch. The video for "Gravedancer" was directed by Vladimir Lik and released in 2007. The video for "Loathsome" was directed by David Brodsky and debuted in late 2007. The video for "The Diplomat" was directed by Phil Mucci and released on October 26, 2012. The video for "Army of Cops" was released on July 10, 2018. David Brodsky returned to direct the video. It was followed by the releases of "The Torture Fields" directed by Frank Huang, and "Mt. Skull".

In early 2019 John Jarvis was dismissed from the band and replaced with Lody Kong guitarist Travis Stone.

In August 2020, Pig Destroyer released The Octagonal Stairway. Pornographers of Sound was released in June 2021.

In 2022, sound designer Blake Harrison left the band and was replaced by Alex Cha in 2023.

On March 10, 2024, Harrison died from sudden pneumonia and heart attack due to complications of his battle with melanoma.

== Influences ==
Scott Hull has mentioned artist Matthew Barney, author Dennis Cooper, and noise musicians Whitehouse as influencing his music. Pig Destroyer is inspired by thrash metal such as Dark Angel and Slayer, the sludge metal of The Melvins, and American grindcore as practiced by Brutal Truth. Some releases are influenced by the metalcore subgenre, specifically Prowler in the Yard and Head Cage.

== Members ==
=== Current ===
- J. R. Hayes – lead vocals (1997–present)
- Scott Hull – guitars (1997–present)
- Adam Jarvis – drums (2011–present)
- Travis Stone – bass, backing vocals (2019–present)
- Alex Cha – noise, samples, backing vocals (2023–present)

=== Former ===
- John Evans – drums (1997–1998)
- Brian Harvey – drums (1998–2011)
- John Jarvis – bass (2013–2019)
- Blake Harrison – noise, samples, backing vocals (2006–2022; died 2024)

=== Live musicians ===
- Donna Parker – noise, samples (2006)
- Jessica Rylan – noise, samples (2006)

== Discography ==
=== Studio albums ===
- Explosions in Ward 6 (1998)
- Prowler in the Yard (2001)
- Terrifyer (2004)
- Phantom Limb (2007)
- Book Burner (2012)
- Head Cage (2018)

=== Split albums ===
- Orchid / Pig Destroyer (1997)
- Pig Destroyer / Gnob (1999)
- Isis / Pig Destroyer (2000)
- Benümb / Pig Destroyer (2002)
- Pig Destroyer / Coldworker / Antigama (2007)

=== Extended plays ===
- Demo (1997)
- 7" Picture Disc (2000)
- Natasha (2008)
- Blind, Deaf, and Bleeding (2012)
- 7" Flexi Disc (2013)
- Mass & Volume (2013)
- The Octagonal Stairway (2020)

=== Compilations ===
- 38 Counts of Battery (2000)
- Painter of Dead Girls (2004)
