= Seth Putnam =

American musician (1968–2011)

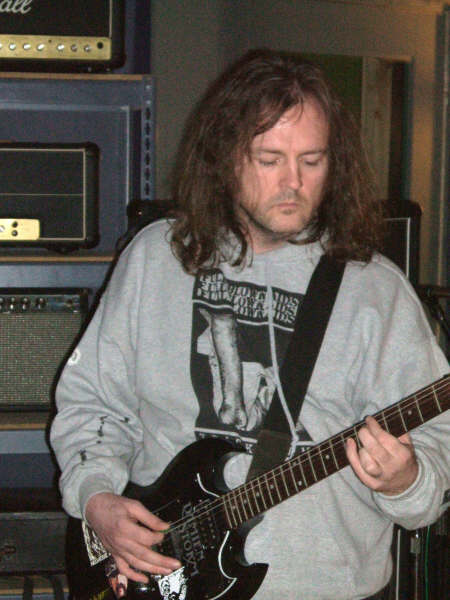
- Putnam in 2007

Background information
- Born: Seth Edward Putnam; May 15, 1968; Newton, Massachusetts, U.S.
- Died: June 11, 2011 (aged 43) Newton, Massachusetts, U.S.
- Genres: Noisegrind; grindcore; sludge metal; thrash metal; hardcore punk; shock rock
- Occupation: Musician
- Instruments: Vocals; guitar; bass; drums
- Years active: 1986–2011
- Labels: Wicked Sick; Limited Appeal; Stridecore
- Formerly of: Anal Cunt; Angry Hate; Executioner; Full Blown AIDS; Impaled Northern Moonforest; Shit Scum; The Death's Head Quartet; Upsidedown Cross; Vaginal Jesus; You're Fired

Seth Edward Putnam (May 15, 1968 – June 11, 2011) was an American musician best known as the founder, frontman and sole consistent member of grindcore band Anal Cunt. His work was known for his high-pitched screamed vocals, with lyrics meant to shock or blaspheme. Throughout his career, Putnam was also involved in numerous side projects.

== Biography ==
=== Early years ===
Seth Edward Putnam was born on May 15, 1968, in Newton, Massachusetts, to Edward R. Putnam and Barbara Ann Donohue. Putnam was married to his first wife, Alison Dunn, from December 1998 through June 2001. He married Julie, his second wife, on May 17, 2008. They remained married until his death. From 1986 to 1988, Putnam played bass in the thrash metal band Executioner. He was also in a band called Satan's Warriors for a brief period of time. Putnam also owned his own record label called "Wicked Sick Records", and had a subsidiary label called "Stridecore Records" that only had one release which was Anal Cunt's The 5,643 Song EP.

=== Anal Cunt ===
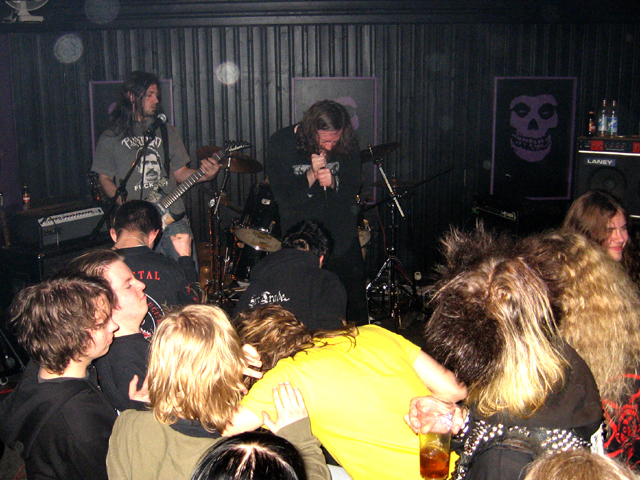
Putnam performing with Anal Cunt in 2007

After leaving Executioner Putnam then had the idea to start a 'noise/blurcore' band and went on to record a demo in his mother's attic. His band Anal Cunt was then formed on March 1, 1988, Putnam later stated he came up with the band's name by choosing the two stupidest words to combine together to form a band name. When Putnam started the band he initially wanted to just release one demo tape however the band ended up turning into something bigger.

The band's first performance was a rehearsal in 1988 at Putnam's mother's house in front of some family members, namely his mother, his two little brothers and his grandmother, as well as some of his mother's friends. The group eventually started touring and released their 47 Song Demo and 88 song demo. Throughout Putnam’s tenure in the band Anal Cunt released multiple albums and EPS. They also toured worldwide, went through numerous lineup changes and disbanded twice.

==== Drug overdoses and coma ====
On October 12, 2004, Putnam was hospitalized after ingesting a cocktail of crack cocaine, alcohol, heroin, and two months' worth of Ambien sleeping pills. It has been reported that he spent the previous day contemplating suicide, though exact circumstances surrounding the drug overdose are vague. He was sent to Spaulding Rehab before he woke up from his coma.

Anal Cunt's 1997 album I Like It When You Die contained the track "You're in a Coma". Putnam's reaction to the resulting irony of being in a coma was published in the Boston Phoenix: "Actually, it turned out it was just as gay as the song I wrote nine years ago – being in a coma was just as fuckin' stupid as I wrote it was." Anal Cunt kept performing "You're in a Coma" during live shows after Putnam's coma, with Putnam sharing anecdotes with the audience before the song.

Prior to his 2004 coma, Putnam overdosed on heroin in 1998. In a 2007 interview, he said: "In 1998 I was dead for 10 minutes from a heroin overdose. The EMT's used that stuff to revive people and it didn't work. They tried it a second time for the hell of it and it worked. All I remember was waking up in my kitchen having no idea where I was. On the way to the hospital, the EMT told me I was probably going to have brain damage the rest of my life. By the time I got to the hospital I was completely back to normal though. I didn't see any 'mystic visions' or anything that time either." Putnam still continued to drink and use heroin following his coma, but not the same extent that he had prior to the coma.

=== Death ===
On June 11, 2011, Putnam died of a suspected heart attack at the age of 43. He is buried at Newton Cemetery in Newton, Massachusetts.

Following his death many tributes were made in Putnam's honor from fellow musicians such as Mike Williams, Scott Hull of Pig Destroyer and Steve Austin of Today is the Day. Philip Anselmo of Pantera stated:

I knew Seth pretty fucking well back in ’90’s… He was hilarious, and an extremist. Seth had a bizarre, absurd sense of humor that pissed a lot of people off, but the way Seth saw it, that’s what they were, just “a lot of pissed-off people. I got his humor like the back of my fist. And truthfully, the dude was unbelievably creative and thrived within his little realm. What I mean by that “little realm” is, that aside from a handful of bands, Seth didn’t give a shit about the majority, and that included all of my bands.

== Personality ==
Despite his shock humor and turbulent lifestyle, Putnam was often described by fans and peers as a warm, intelligent, and sensitive person. Putnam saw himself as a comedian and used music as an outlet. Following his death in 2011, The Guardian dubbed Putnam "the GG Allin of grindcore".

In school, classmates who knew Putnam described him as intelligent and stern, but unmotivated, apathetic and often an underwhelming student. Putnam skipped a grade in school and became a very bright student, tutoring his classmates. In his own words, Putnam often blamed brutal fights with Catholic school nuns for helping to shape his cynical personality. When he reached high school, he had lost interest in excelling in education or academics, becoming more of a slacker and underachiever. By the time he had graduated school, Putnam had left the Catholic religion in which he was raised. After graduating from Newton North High School in 1985, Putnam showed no interest in attending college or university.

Putnam also made up his own religion when he was a child. He stated his all-time favorite bands were Negative Approach and The Village People, and that his favorite movie was The Bad Bunch. He also stated that he didn’t pay attention to any music that was made after 1985.

The 2018 grindcore documentary Slave to the Grind explores Putnam in detail, with his peers expressing the duality of his nature: former bandmates Tim Morse and Scott Hull describe Putnam often being personable and relaxed, but Hull also notes that he'd often get arrested causing trouble on the street. Discordance Axis singer Jon Chang notes that he was really close to Putnam for years, but describes him as a "really disturbed guy" and a "backstabbing piece of shit at the end of his life". Chang also recounted an incident after a show when Putnam introduced his mother to Chang, he remarked that they had met earlier when he pulled Putnam's mother out from the show's moshpit, causing Putnam to become aggressive and threaten Chang, much to the confusion of everyone present. Putnam was also good friends with Pantera frontman Philip Anselmo. Anselmo used to get Anal Cunt to open for Pantera whenever they went through Boston. Anal Cunt opened for Pantera three times. Putnam recorded backing vocals for Pantera's album The Great Southern Trendkill. Putnam also released a medley of the Pantera songs The Great Southern Trendkill and Rock the World for the Anal Cunt album The Old Stuff Part 3. Putnam referenced Pantera in the song Loudest Stereo. There is also footage of Putnam singing "Suicide Note Part II" with Anselmo at a show in 1998.

In 2019, Brutal Truth and Venomous Concept vocalist Kevin Sharp did an interview with Metal Underground and talked about a conversation he had with Seth after his coma. He also said that Putnam was an "encyclopedia of music".

According to Eyehategod vocalist Mike Williams, Putnam was a normal guy off-stage and very quiet and soft-spoken. Williams also stated that he used to call Putnam, whom he had known since 1988, long distance from the Chevron gas station that he worked at, so that all his calls would be charged to Chevron.

== Feuds and incidents ==
=== Chris Barnes ===
In 1996, Putnam attended a Six Feet Under show to recruit a new drummer for Anal Cunt. During Six Feet Under’s set Putnam began to heckle vocalist Chris Barnes. Following the show, Barnes grabbed Putnam by the shirt resulting in him challenging Barnes to a fight outside the venue. According to Putnam as he was exiting the venue he was jumped by Six Feet Under’s roadies, and was thrown out of the venue. Putnam later released the song "Chris Barnes Is a Pussy" as retaliation to the incident.

Despite the feud between the two Putnam later stated in 2003, that he became a fan of Six Feet Under’s music because they are "one of the funniest bands in the world."

=== Hatebreed incident ===
Anal Cunt were booked to play at the second New England Metal and Hardcore Festival in 2000. Misfits headlined the main stage, Anal Cunt headlined the second stage and Hatebreed headlined the Commercial Street Cafe. Problems arose when the Hatebreed set was shut down due to problems with the sound system, so security moved Hatebreed to Anal Cunt's stage, and set them up to play before them. This apparently upset the audience that were expecting to see Anal Cunt, and according to Josh Martin, vocalist Jamey Jasta got angry and called the crowd a bunch of "washed up metalheads" and allegedly claimed that Hatebreed were more popular and sold more records than Anal Cunt. Putnam and Martin were at the bar next door not knowing what was going on, but returned by the time the Hatebreed set was over to see that Putnam was yelled at by Jasta. A melee then ensued. Martin, who owned a VHS tape of the fight (which ended up getting lost), claimed that Putnam was standing 20 feet away watching the melee ensue. Putnam was arrested by the end of the night, along with his wife.

In February 2021, Jamey Jasta interviewed Jimmy Bower from Eyehategod on his podcast "The Jasta Show". Jasta mentioned a story where Putnam requested a mop to make sure the stage was clean because people were skating on it and eventually ended up attacking the audience with it instead. He also said he used to distribute Anal Cunt's albums and book their shows. Bower told stories of Putnam using a fire extinguisher on stage and getting foam all over Eyehategod's gear.

In 2008, interview with the BrooklynVegan Putnam stated he would have liked to meet both Barnes and Jasta "so [he] can beat the living shit out of both of their little pussy asses."

=== Dropdead ===
Putnam invited members of the band Dropdead to an Anal Cunt show on October 31, 2000. During the set, Putnam mocked Dropdead's lyrics before turning his attention to the audience. In response, Dropdead vocalist Bob Otis pushed Putnam off the stage, prompting a fight that was ultimately broken up by police. Putnam later stated that the feud had been resolved after he spoke with Dropdead guitarist Ben Barnett.

== Side projects and former bands ==
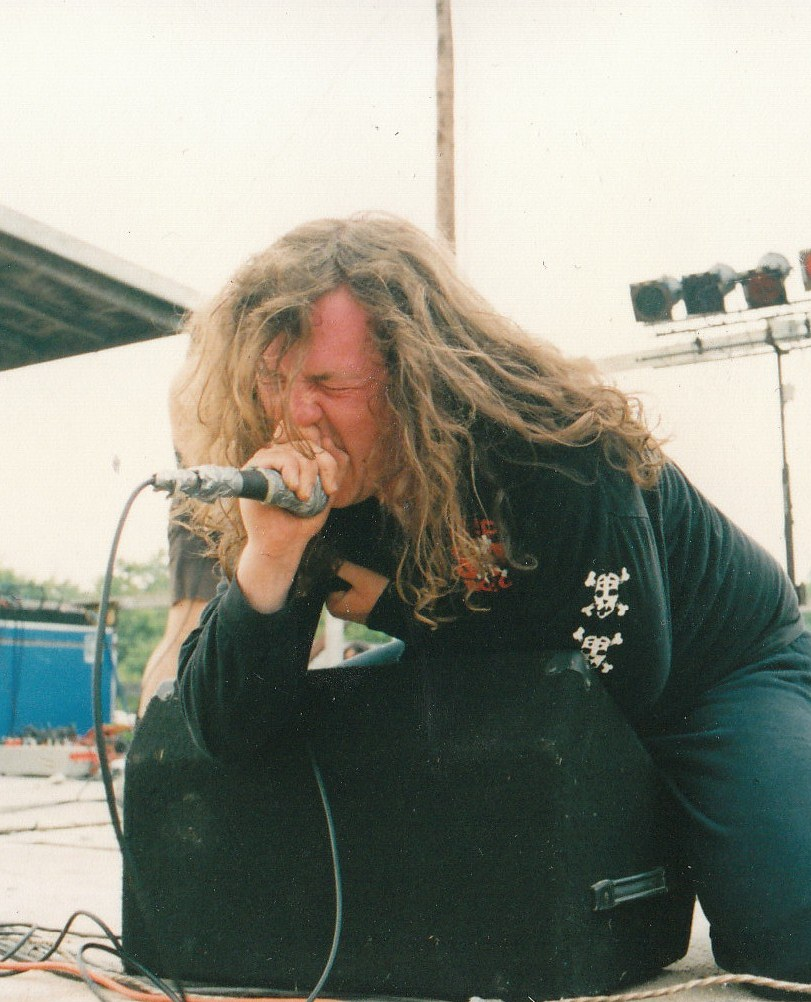
Putnam performing in 1993

=== Angry Hate ===
The idea of the band came up when Putnam and Larry Lifeless (vocalist of the band Kilslug) were drunk one night watching Jerry Springer and Larry said "That guy looks like he should be in an old punk band called Angry Hate or something". The first recording was in January 1999 of Larry "hammering a fence against some lady's garage" which was put at the end of the song "M.P." on their first release. That summer, they recorded four songs, all of which were old Sickness songs. "Blinking Blue Lights" was actually recorded by Kilslug, but never released. The other songs originally by the Sickness were never released. They recorded another EP called Bad Mood that had a number of copies pressed, but was never officially released—Putnam and Lee Suniga (owner of Menace to Sobriety Records) sold the copies on eBay. Angry Hate performed two live shows in March and April 2002. In 2004 they recorded a song called "Satan Wins" with Paulie Kraynak on bass but this has also never been released.

=== Shit Scum ===
Shit Scum formed in 1988 after Putnam saw an ad looking for musicians. Putnam chose to call after seeing Cryptic Slaughter as the only influence as not many people in Boston were into that band. Putnam eventually invited Fred Ordonez to see Satan's Warriors (which was their last show). Anal Cunt was also playing what was supposed to be their last show but Ordonez and his friends never showed up. Putnam did another show with Anal Cunt so Ordonez could see them, while Shit Scum also did their first show on the same day. Putnam was eventually invited to a studio to play bass on their first demo called "Self Mutilation". They later did a show in January, 1990. Putnam and Ordonez (without Wayne, who was their drummer) went to a studio that college rock bands mainly performed at. The engineer did not like them and tried convincing them to quit. The record was eventually finished and they ended up owing the studio money so the studio kept the master reel.

=== Full Blown A.I.D.S. ===
Full Blown A.I.D.S. started in 1997 while Putnam was jamming with his friend and cousin. In 1998, he wrote some songs and recorded a demo of "No One Cares" with Nate Linehan on drums. In 2002 he moved to Texas for a while but eventually moved back to Boston. In 2003 the band went into the studio and recorded some songs and mixed them in a day. They eventually put out two EPs and a compilation CD in 2008, with both EPs and the song "Throwing Cars at People on Coke with Thor".

=== Death's Head Quartet ===
The Death's Head Quartet was a jazz/noise improvisational band that featured Putnam on bass and vocals, Chris Joyce on guitar, Robert Williams on drums, and Jim Hobbs on saxophone.

=== You're Fired ===
You're Fired started in 2002. Within two months they had a nine-song demo recorded which eventually became the Warning EP and was released in 2002. After Putnam died, they made an EP called The End with Paulie Kraynak on guitar. Most of the riffs were written by Putnam and the album was also recorded with Putnam's Gibson SG, Marshall cabinet and the Ampeg SS-140C amplifier head borrowed from Paulie Kraynak that was also used on the Warning EP. The End was released in 2012 on vinyl and it also can be purchased on BandCamp along with the Warning EP. The song "Throw It Off" from their last EP was originally an Anal Cunt song with different lyrics.

=== Upsidedown Cross ===
Upsidedown Cross started in 1989 after Larry Lifeless' band "Kilslug" had a violent breakup. The first lineup featured Larry (vocals), Cheez (bass), and Scott Vangel (guitar) who went by "Shoehorn" in the band. Taang! Records thought the band were too insane to deal with, and wouldn't sign them unless Rico Pertoleum (ex-Kilslug) was in the band, he was kicked out after the songwriting for the first record was done. J. Mascis from Dinosaur Jr. filled in on drums for the first album. Throughout the 90's they had different lineup changes and had a few more releases. Seth Putnam ended up joining them on guitar and did one show with them which also turned out to be the band's last show before they eventually broke up, Seth ended up moving to Texas. There were plans to get the band back together with Josh Martin on guitar. According to Josh, Cheez wasn't in any state to be playing an instrument, so he ended up starting Adolf Satan instead. When Seth moved back to Boston him and Josh became the two guitarists for the band, Seth ended up quitting the band in March 2003. Seth and Josh never recorded anything with the band despite Seth being credited on their split with Sloth, Cheez decided to put out an old recording and credit the lineup they had at the time. In 2011 Upsidedown Cross became a two-piece with Seth on drums and Larry on vocals and guitar. Some rehearsal footage exists of the band.

=== Cannibal Hitler ===
Not much info exists on this band: they have one known cassette release on Wicked Sick Records (Putnam's label) called "Don't Worry It's All Grindcore" which came out in 1989. Some of his other lesser known projects include Vaginal Jesus, Sirhan Sirhan and Adolph Satan.

=== Seven Minutes of Nausea ===
Putnam played drums on their "Disobediant Loser" EP and Fred Ordonez (credited as "Fred Kase") who used to be in Anal Cunt played guitar on the same EP along with Matthias Weigand playing bass. They later did a split album with his other band Anal Cunt.

=== Impaled Northern Moonforest ===
Impaled Northern Moonforest was a black metal band Putnam formed in the late 1990s. Like many of his bands, the group started out as a joke. They released one self titled EP that heavily parodies the black metal genre.

=== Siege ===
When the Boston based hardcore band Siege reformed in 1991 Putnam auditioned to be their new vocalist, replacing Kevin Mahoney. Putnam was in the band for one year and recorded a four-song demo that was believed to be lost due to the master reel being damaged.

=== Bands he filled in or did a guest appearance for ===
- Adolf Satan (bass and drums at several live performances)
- Eyehategod (fill in on vocals for show in New Orleans during Mardi Gras in 1996)
- Fear of God (drums at one live performance)
- Flächenbrand (drums at one song at one live performance)
- Haggis (vocal duet with Wattie Buchan from The Exploited on the song "A Calling to Arms")
- Kilslug (guitar at two live performances)
- Nightstick (vocals at two live performances)
- Pantera (in 1996, Putnam did guest vocals on The Great Southern Trendkill for their songs "The Great Southern Trendkill", "War Nerve", "13 Steps to Nowhere", and "Suicide Note Pt. II").
- Scissorfight
- Slapshot (additional vocals on some songs on the "Live At SO36" album, also appears in their "Live In Germany 1993" VHS)
- Thor (vocals and guitar on the song "Throwing Cars at People on Coke with Thor)
- Today Is the Day (did vocals on their song "Butterflies")
- Discordance Axis (additional vocals on "Ruin Trajectory" at their show at CBGB's in August, 1995)
- Nunslaughter (spoken intro on the "Gruesome" live album)
- Deceased (sung a cover of "Black Metal" by Venom with them)
