= Scott Hull (guitarist) =

American guitarist

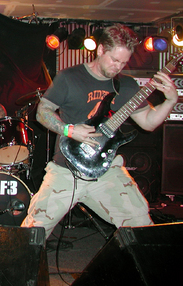
- Hull playing guitar with Pig Destroyer

Background information
- Born: March 4, 1971 (age 54); Lynchburg, Virginia, U.S.
- Genres: Grindcore
- Occupations: Musician; record producer
- Instruments: Guitar; programming
- Years active: 1991–present
- Member of: Pig Destroyer; Agoraphobic Nosebleed; Japanese Torture Comedy Hour
- Formerly of: Anal Cunt

Scott Hull (born March 4, 1971) is an American grindcore musician, and the current guitarist and producer for Pig Destroyer, Agoraphobic Nosebleed, and Japanese Torture Comedy Hour. He has been part of many other projects including the controversial band Anal Cunt (also known as AC or AxCx). Aside from his music works, he currently works as a government computer specialist. Hull is noted for his experimental style of guitar playing that incorporates various influences, as well as for his use of eight string and seven string guitars.

== Career ==
=== Head in the Picklejar ===
Member: 1991 - 1995 (Guitars)

Head in the Picklejar (known as HIPj) established Hull as a formidable guitar player with this "thrash jazz" trio (with sailboat Captain Ben Eriksen on drums and Physicist Matt "Rosie" Rosen on Bass), genre hopping with songs about fishing, isolation, and the media. HIPj performed at CBGBs several times, opening for Urge Overkill, Unsane, the Supreme Dicks, Swinging Udders, and White Trash in their early days. HIPj had a previous incarnation as Technical Misanthrope which played from 1985-1988.

=== Pig Destroyer ===
Member: 1997–Present (Guitars)

Scott can be seen as the driving force of Pig Destroyer's sound considering the lack of a bass player (until 2013). He uses a multiple amplifier setup with rigs set on either side of the stage during live shows, spreading out his sound to fill the void left by the missing bassist. You can hear his distinct sound on Pig Destroyer's most prevalent releases: Phantom Limb, Terrifyer, Prowler in the Yard and Explosions in Ward 6, which includes the 38 Counts of Battery, compilation album (remastered and including the complete discography of the band up until 2000). Recordings usually consist of multiple guitar tracks.

=== Anal Cunt ===
Member: 1995 (Guitars)

Scott's guitar work can be heard on Anal Cunt's 1996 release 40 More Reasons to Hate Us. Although not as technical as Scott's work with Pig Destroyer, his heavy sound is still prevalent with AxCx. According to Seth Putnam, he (himself) did most of the guitar playing and a lot of the drumming, as Tim could not play what he wanted him to and Scott was too new in the band to know all of their songs, as well as the fact that Seth just wanted to play guitar.

=== Agoraphobic Nosebleed ===
Member: 1994–Present

Scott has been the only permanent member in Agoraphobic Nosebleed, formed in 1994. Their first live performance was in 2003 when Pig Destroyer cut their set short to let ANb play two songs and an intro. Hull's drum programming with Agoraphobic Nosebleed earned him the Top Spot on a Top 25 Drummers in Modern Metal list on heavy metal website MetalSucks.

=== Japanese Torture Comedy Hour ===
Member: 1996 - Unknown

Formed by Scott Hull and former AC member Tim Morse, with Andrew Kokes doing electronics, Japanese Torture Comedy Hour is, as Scott puts it, a "hybrid of noisecore and power electronics." Audio recordings are hard to come by for JTCH.

=== Production work ===
Scott is also known for his ability of producing and mastering not only his own projects' albums, but others' as well, such as the debut album by Sockweb. His studio, Visceral Sound, is based in Bethesda, Maryland. He is not to be confused with New York-based mastering engineer Scott Hull (owner of Masterdisk).

== Influences ==
Hull has spoken highly of experimental thrash metal band Voivod, jazz fusion guitarists John McLaughlin and Allan Holdsworth, and sludge metal innovators the Melvins.
