= D.R.I. discography =

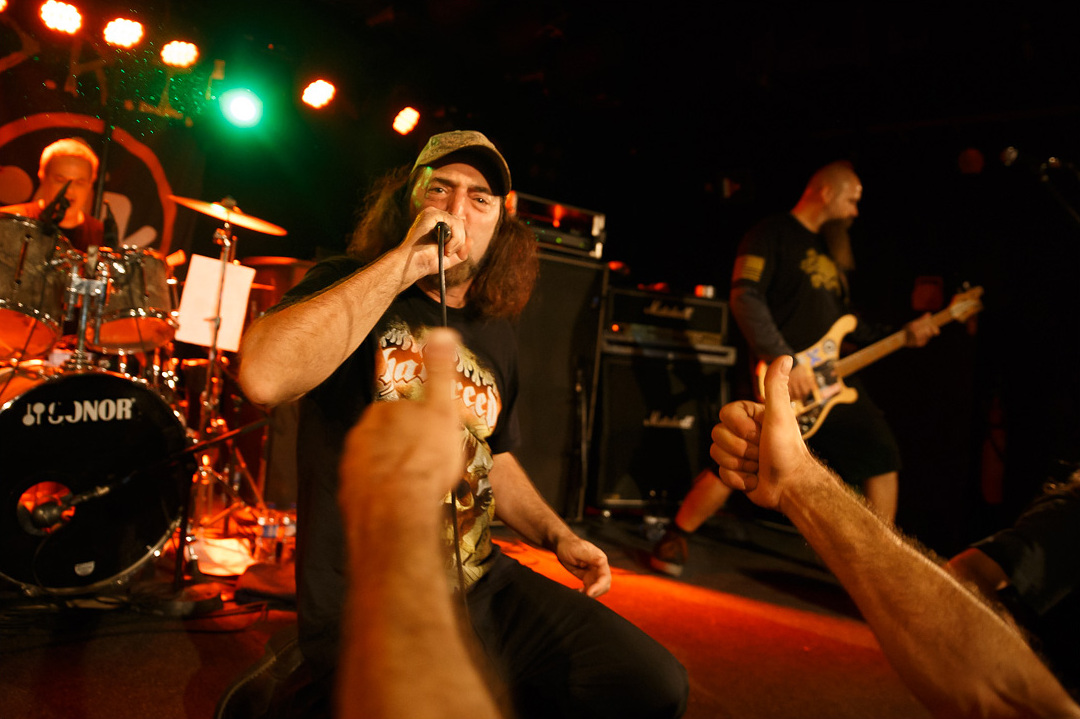
- Studio albums: 7
- Extended plays: 3
- Live albums: 2
- Compilation albums: 2

This is a discography of D.R.I., an American crossover thrash band formed in 1982 by Kurt Brecht, Spike Cassidy, Dennis Johnson and Eric Brecht. D.R.I. currently consists of Kurt Brecht (lead vocals), Spike Cassidy (guitar and backing vocals), Harald Oimoen (bass), and Rob Rampy (drums). The band rose to prominence in the U.S. during the thrash metal era with their albums 4 of a Kind and Thrash Zone. The band has released seven studio albums, two EPs, a split album, two compilation albums and two live albums.

Before signing a record contract with Metal Blade Records in 1984, the band released their self-titled debut album in 1983 and the Violent Pacification EP a year later on the Dirty Rotten label. D.R.I. followed up with their second full-length album Dealing with It! in 1985, and Crossover two years later. In 1988, D.R.I. released 4 of a Kind which was their first album to chart on Billboard 200, reaching No. 116. Their follow-up album, Thrash Zone, peaked at No. 140 on the American charts and was their final album to chart in the US. D.R.I.'s chart success slowly fell throughout the 1990s until they released their last studio album to date Full Speed Ahead in 1995, which failed to chart in the US. Three tracks from this album would make up their contribution to a split album with Italian hardcore band Raw Power in 2001, The Dirty Rotten Power.

Since 1996, D.R.I. had continued touring and going on hiatus sporadically. No new full-length albums under the D.R.I. name have been released since 1995; however, a new demo track, "Against Me", was released as a digital download on their website in 2004, and an EP containing new music But Wait... There's More! was released twelve years later in 2016. There have been discussions of a new studio album, but it has never materialized.

== Studio albums ==
Year	Album details	Peak chart positions
Year	Album details	US
Year	Album details	Billboard 200
1983	Dirty Rotten LP: Released: 1983; Label: Dirty Rotten; Format: LP, CS, CD	—
1985	Dealing with It!: Released: March 1985; Label: Metal Blade; Format: LP, CS, CD	—
1987	Crossover: Released: March 9, 1987; Label: Metal Blade; Format: LP, CS, CD	—
1988	4 of a Kind: Released: June 27, 1988; Label: Metal Blade; Format: LP, CS, CD	116
1989	Thrash Zone: Released: October 10, 1989; Label: Metal Blade; Format: LP, CS, CD	140
1992	Definition: Released: October 20, 1992; Label: Dirty Rotten; Format: LP, CS, CD	—
1995	Full Speed Ahead: Released: October 24, 1995; Label: Dirty Rotten; Format: LP, CS, CD	—
"—" denotes releases that did not chart.

== Live albums ==
Year	Album details
1994	Live: Released: 1994; Label: Dirty Rotten; Format: CD
2005	Live at CBGB's 1984: Released: October 11, 2005; Label: Dirty Rotten; Format: CD

== Compilation albums ==
Year	Album details
2001	Greatest Hits: Released: August 21, 2001; Label: Cleopatra; Format: CD

== Extended plays ==
Year	Album details
1984	Violent Pacification: Released: 1984; Label: Dirty Rotten; Format: EP
2001	The Dirty Rotten Power (split EP with Raw Power): Released: 2001; Label: Killer Release Records; Format: EP
2016	But Wait... There's More!: Released: June 10, 2016; Label: Beer City; Format: EP
