= List of thrashcore bands =

This is a list of notable bands considered to be thrashcore. Thrashcore (also known as fastcore) is a fast tempo subgenre of hardcore punk that emerged in the early 1980s, that is essentially sped-up hardcore, often using blast beats.

- ACxDC
- The Accüsed
- Benümb
- Cryptic Slaughter
- Deep Wound
- Dirty Rotten Imbeciles
- Dr and The Crippens
- Dropdead
- Electro Hippies
- Fig 4.0
- Flag of Democracy
- Heresy
- Gauze
- Guyana Punch Line
- Hellnation
- Hüsker Dü
- King Parrot
- Lärm
- Los Crudos
- Raw Power
- Septic Death
- Septic Tank
- Siege
- S.O.B.
- Straight Ahead
- Svetlanas
- Trash Talk
- Vitamin X
- Vivisick
- Void
- What Happens Next?
