= But Wait... There's More! =

EP by D.R.I.
- Released: June 10, 2016
- Genre: Hardcore punk
- Length: 9:24
- Label: Beer City Records
- Producer: Bill Metoyer

D.R.I. chronology
Live at CBGB's 1984 (2005)	But Wait... There's More! (2016)

But Wait... There's More! is an EP by the American crossover thrash band D.R.I. It was released on June 10, 2016, and is their first studio recording since 1995's Full Speed Ahead, and their first EP since 1984's Violent Pacification. But Wait... There's More! is also D.R.I.'s first release with Harald Oimoen on bass and Brandon Karns on drums, although the latter had left the band before its release. The EP contains three new studio tracks and two re-recorded versions of two songs from their 1985 album Dealing with It! ("Mad Man" and "Couch Slouch"), and marked the first time since 1989's Thrash Zone that the band had worked with producer Bill Metoyer.

== Track listing ==
No.	Title	Length
1.	"Against Me"	2:12
2.	"Anonymity"	2:48
3.	"As Seen on TV"	1:35
4.	"Mad Man"	1:04
5.	"Couch Slouch"	1:45
Total length:		9:24

== Personnel ==
- Kurt Brecht – vocals
- Spike Cassidy – guitars
- Harald Oimoen – bass
- Brandon Karns – drums
