= Live (D.R.I. album) =

Live album by Dirty Rotten Imbeciles
- Released: 1994
- Recorded: 1992
- Genre: Crossover thrash, hardcore punk
- Length: 50:15
- Label: Dirty Rotten
- Producer: Spike Cassidy

Dirty Rotten Imbeciles chronology
Definition (1992)	Live (1994)	Full Speed Ahead (1995)

Live is a live album by the hardcore punk band Dirty Rotten Imbeciles, recorded at the Hollywood Palladium in November 1992.

== Track listing ==
1. Intro + Thrashard 5:02
2. Acid Rain 4:22
3. Mad Man 0:51
4. Couch Slouch 1:38
5. Argument Then War 3:25
6. The Application 4:21
7. I Don't Need Society 1:59
8. Hardball 3:03
9. Violent Pacification 2:54
10. Beneath The Wheel 5:15
11. The Explorer 1:53
12. Commuter Man 0:58
13. You Say I'm Scum 2:23
14. The Five Year. Plan 4:44
15. Suit And Tie Guy 3:29
16. Nursinghome Blues 4:28

== Personnel ==
- Kurt Brecht – lead vocals
- Spike Cassidy – guitars, backing vocals
- John Menor – bass, backing vocals
- Rob Rampy – drums, backing vocals
