= The Dirty Rotten Power =

EP by Dirty Rotten Imbeciles, Raw Power
- Released: 2001
- Genre: Crossover thrash
- Length: 7:43
- Label: Killer Release Records

D.R.I. chronology
Full Speed Ahead (1995)	The Dirty Rotten Power (2001)	Greatest Hits (2001)

Raw Power chronology
Trust Me! (2000)	The Dirty Rotten Power (2001)	...Still Screaming (After 20 Years) (2003)

The Dirty Rotten Power is a split EP with three songs by the American crossover thrash band D.R.I. and two songs by Italian hardcore punk band Raw Power, and was released in 2001. It was released exclusively on 7" vinyl by Killer Release Records. It was reissued in 2012 on 2x Flexi-disc, 7", 33 ⅓ RPM single-sided vinyl under F.O.A.D. Records containing a bonus track.

== Track listing ==
D.R.I.
No.	Title	Length
1.	"Who Am I?"	0:47
2.	"Broke"	0:45
3.	"Problem Addict"	1:39

Raw Power
No.	Title	Length
4.	"Trust Me"	2:05
5.	"Keep Your Hands Off Me"	2:27
6.	"Wherever You Are" (Bonus track)	2:35

- Songs 1-3 are taken from D.R.I.'s 1995 Full Speed Ahead album. Songs 4 and 5 are taken from Raw Power's 2000 album, Trust Me!.

== Personnel ==
Band

- Kurt Brecht – vocals
- Spike Cassidy – guitars
- Chumly Porter – bass
- Rob Rampy – drums

Miscellaneous staff

- TERMINALaRt – artwork
