= Greatest Hits (D.R.I. album) =

Compilation album by D.R.I.
- Released: August 21, 2001
- Recorded: 1983–1987
- Genre: Hardcore punk Crossover thrash
- Length: 39:20
- Label: Cleopatra Records
- Producer: Various

D.R.I. chronology
The Dirty Rotten Power (2001)	Greatest Hits (2001)	Live at CBGB's 1984 (2005)

Greatest Hits is a compilation album released in 2001 by D.R.I. According to the band, the label released the compilation without listening to it, resulting in an incorrect track list and ticking noises on a couple of the tracks.

The album was initially released in two different titles: the 2004 reissue was released as Dirty Rotten Hitz while the 2005 version was released as Thrashkore Retrospektif.

== Track listing ==
1. "Who Am I" – 0:49
2. "Commuter Man" – 0:58
3. "Yes Ma'am" – 0:50
4. "Sad To Be" – 1:42
5. "The Explorer" – 2:58
6. "Violent Pacification" – 1:35
7. "Argument Then War" – 1:25
8. "Mad Man" – 1:40
9. "Couch Slouch" – 3:22
10. "Nursing Home Blues" – 3:50
11. "I Don't Need Society" – 0:59
12. "A Coffin" – 3:05
13. "Redline" – 4:06
14. "Hooked" – 3:00
15. "Probation" – 4:05
16. "Five Year Plan" – 2:44
17. "No Religion" – 2:12

== Credits ==
- Kurt Brecht – vocals
- Spike Cassidy – guitars
- Chumly Porter – bass
- Rob Rampy – drums
