= Live at CBGB's 1984 =

Live album by Dirty Rotten Imbeciles
- Released: February 11, 2005
- Recorded: April 7, 1984
- Genres: Crossover thrash, hardcore punk
- Length: 39:15
- Label: Beer City Records
- Producer: Unknown

Dirty Rotten Imbeciles chronology
| Greatest Hits (2001) | Live at CBGB's 1984 (2005) | But Wait... There's More! (2016) |

Live at CBGB's 1984 is a live album by American crossover thrash band D.R.I., released on October 11, 2005. It features a live performance of the band at the famous music venue CBGB in New York City. AllMusic rated it 3.5 out of 5 points.

The audio of the performance is very raw, and the quality drops significantly in the recording at around track 32.

== Track listing ==
1. I Don't Need Society 01:32
2. Reaganomics 00:33
3. Commuter Man 00:47
4. Plastique 00:17
5. Why 00:14
6. Balance of Terror 00:55
7. My Fate to Hate 00:21
8. Who Am I 00:29
9. Money Stinks 00:41
10. Human Waste 00:19
11. Yes Ma'am 01:39
12. Dennis' Problem 00:47
13. Closet Punk 00:38
14. How to Act 01:01
15. Give My Taxes Back 00:47
16. Equal People 00:41
17. On My Way Home 00:51
18. Bail Out 00:46
19. Snap 01:03
20. The Explorer 01:29
21. Slit My Wrists 00:20
22. Stupid War 00:59
23. Counter Attack 00:14
24. I'd Rather Be Sleeping 01:15
25. Running Around 01:07
26. Couch Slouch 01:23
27. To Open Closed Doors 00:30
28. God Is Broke 01:14
29. Soup Kitchen 01:50
30. Sad to Be 01:57
31. War Crimes 01:03
32. Busted 00:53
33. Draft Me 00:22
34. First Round Draft Choice 00:29
35. Capitalists Suck 00:32
36. Mad Man 01:13
37. Misery Loves Company 00:41
38. No Sense 01:34
39. Blockhead 01:46
40. Violent Pacification 04:03

== Personnel ==
- Kurt Brecht – vocals
- Spike Cassidy – guitars
- Josh Pappe – bass
- Eric Brecht – drums
