= N.Y.C. Mayhem =

American hardcore punk band

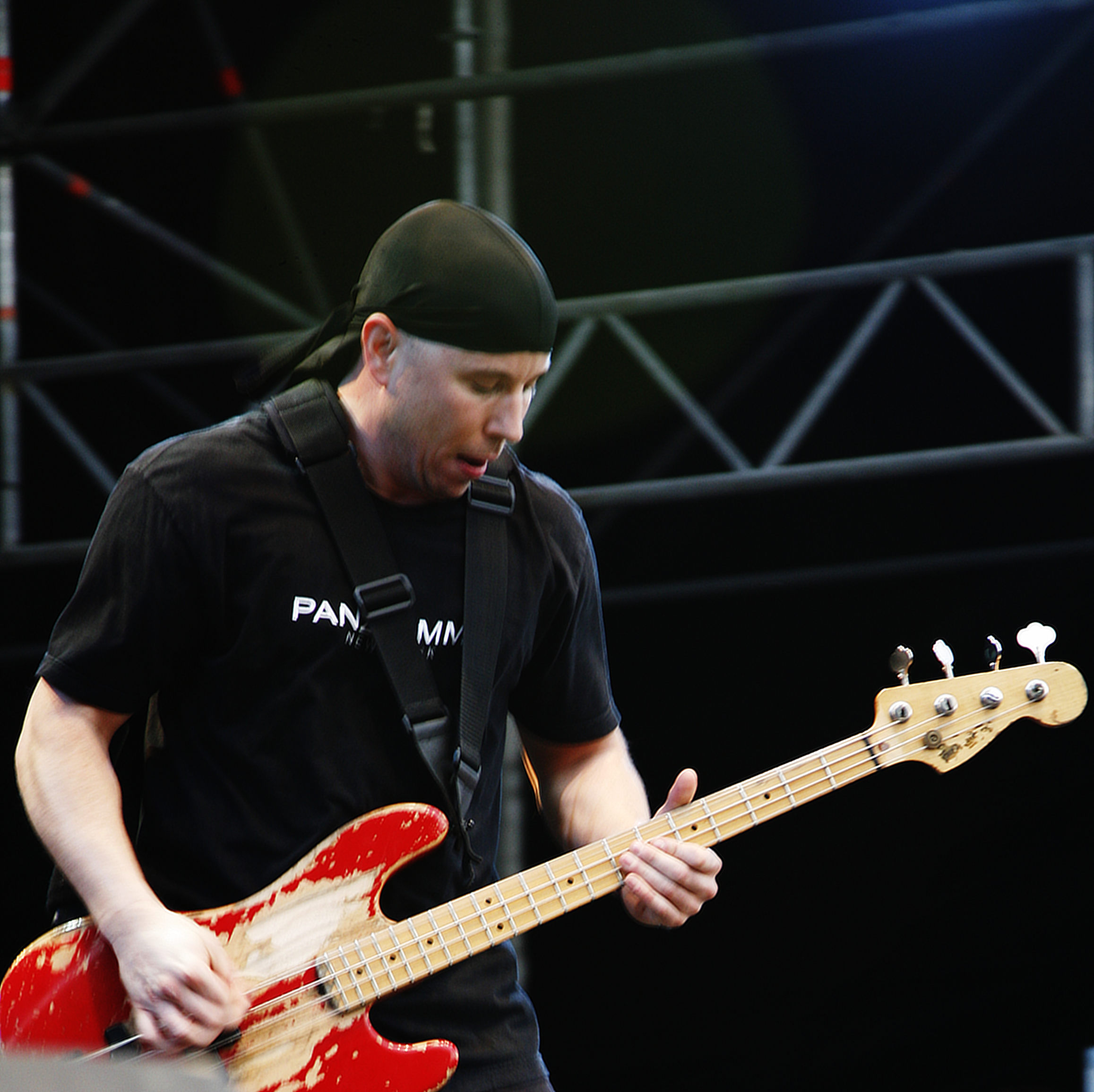
- Craig Setari performing in 2007

Background information
- Origin: New York City, U.S.
- Genres: Hardcore punk; thrashcore
- Years active: 1984–1985
- Labels: I Risk; One Step Ahead; Radio Raheem; Urinal; Hell's Headbangers
- Spinoffs: Straight Ahead
- Past members: Gordon Ancis; Tony Marc Shimkin; Tommy Carroll; Craig Setari

N.Y.C. Mayhem was an American straight edge hardcore punk band formed in Queens, New York City in 1984 by drummer and vocalist Tommy Carroll, guitarist Gordon Ancis and bassist Tony Marc Shimkin.

== History ==
N.Y.C. Mayhem were formed by former Assault guitarist and bassist Gordon Ancis and Tony Marc Shimkin, along with drummer and vocalist Tommy Carroll, who had previously played in Corrupt, in 1984. The band would then change their name to "N.Y.C. Mayhem" in 1985, release their debut demo tape "Mayhemic Destruction" and then replace Shimkin with Craig Setari. Late 1985 saw the release of their debut EP "We Stand" and the band's disbandment.

=== Disbandment ===
The three final members of N.Y.C. Mayhem formed "Straight Ahead", with the addition of Rob Echeverria on guitar instead of Gordon Ancis. This lineup would record a 7-inch as a three-piece before recruiting Armand Majidi on drums, having Carroll move over to only vocals.

Original bass player Tony Marc Shimkin has worked with artists such as Madonna, on her 1992 album Erotica. The band's vocalist, Tommy Carroll, went on to be the drummer in Youth of Today and vocalist of Irate. Original guitarist Gordon Ancis went on to found pioneering death metal band Hellhouse in 1985, as well as Zero Hour, which included ex-Whiplash guitarist Tony Scaglione, Massacre guitarist Rob Goodwin and Deathrash bassist Pat Burns. Ancis also played in New York crossover thrash band Leeway and hardcore punk band Agnostic Front. Bassist Craig Setari has played bass for New York hardcore punk band Sick of It All since 1992. Setari has also played with Youth of Today, Agnostic Front and Cro-Mags.

== Musical style and legacy ==
N.Y.C. Mayhem are considered a hardcore punk and thrashcore band. some of their songs as an early form of death metal. The band's earliest influences were Black Sabbath, Iron Maiden, Metallica and Judas Priest. However, in the following years, they became one of the earliest bands to blur the lines between punk rock and heavy metal, with their style being just as much indebted to extreme metal bands like Venom and Slayer as it was to Void, Necros and Negative Approach. The band have also been cited as referring to their own music as "deathcore" as early as 1985. Bernard Doe of Metal Forces magazine referred to them as "the fastest band around".

N.Y.C. Mayhem was a significant influence on Stormtroopers of Death, as well as the genres of death metal, grindcore and black metal due to early use of death growls and heavy riffing on tracks from 1985's We Stand such as "Necropolis (City Of The Dead)" and "Deathwish". Jeffrey Walker of English band Carcass has cited N.Y.C. Mayhem as a major influence on the band's early grindcore sound. Shane Embury (later of Napalm Death) and Mitch Dickinson (later of Heresy)'s band Warhammer were heavily influenced by N.Y.C. Mayhem's early demo tapes. According to Matt Olivo of grindcore band Repulsion, N.Y.C. Mayhem were one of the bands that inspired them to play at the speed they did. Charlie Benante of Anthrax has said that the first time that he ever heard blast beats was from one of N.Y.C. Mayhem's demo tapes, inspiring him to learn the technique himself. Tom Capone, guitarist of Quicksand, has cited N.Y.C. Mayhem as one of his favorite bands in the world.

== Members ==
Final lineup

- Tommy Carroll – lead vocals (1984–1985; 1986–1987; 1988), drums (1984–1985; 1986–1987)
- Craig Setari – bass (1985; 1986–1987; 1988)
- Gordon Ancis – guitar (1984–1985)

Past members

- Tony Marc Shimkin – bass (1984–1985)

== Discography ==
EPs

- We Stand (1985)

Demos

- Mayhemic Destruction (1985)
- Violence (1985)

Compilations

- The Metal Days / The Crossover Days (2011)
- For Real! (2014)
