= Dirty Rotten LP =

Dirty Rotten EP/LP

Studio album by Dirty Rotten Imbeciles
- Released: March 1983
- Recorded: November 1982
- Genre: Hardcore punk, thrashcore
- Length: 17:03
- Label: Dirty Rotten
- Producer: D.R.I.

Dirty Rotten Imbeciles chronology
Dirty Rotten EP/LP (1983)	Violent Pacification (1984)

Professional ratings
Review scores
Source	Rating
Allmusic	4.5/5 stars

Dirty Rotten EP/LP is the 1983 debut release by the crossover thrash band Dirty Rotten Imbeciles. The album has a very gritty sound, and is considered one of the first thrashcore albums.

== Recording and release ==
D.R.I. had only existed for about four months, in which time they practiced every night and played a few shows in the Houston area. Dirty Rotten was recorded and produced by the band in the Brecht's parents' home which had a room walled with egg cartons as soundproofing where the band practiced. The original cover was a photo of the back of drummer Eric Brecht's head. The record was originally released by the band on their own record label, also called Dirty Rotten. The original pressing was a 7", played at 33 RPM, titled Dirty Rotten EP.

The Dirty Rotten EP sold out quickly and has since then been reissued many times with various track listings and bonus songs. Later in 1983 it was released as a 12" LP (with the two upper arms of EP in the album's title hastily scribbled out to make it Dirty Rotten LP) with the help of R Radical Records, fellow Houston punk band MDC's label. It was later remixed and re-released with new cover art, and with the songs that originally appeared on side one appearing on side two and vice versa, these would become the track listing and cover art for most subsequent re-releases. This album would also be combined with all four songs from their 1984 Violent Pacification EP. The Dirty Rotten LP was re-released yet again in 2003 as the Dirty Rotten CD, with 22 bonus tracks.

The Dirty Rotten CD closes with two radio appearances by the band from around the time they recorded Dirty Rotten EP, when they were still known as U.S.D.R.I. In these appearances they discuss upcoming shows with The Dead Kennedys and Chron Gen as well as play some of their demos. The CD ends with the band chiding the DJ for playing music that is "not thrash," while he puts on Einstürzende Neubauten.

== Reception ==
Spin called the album, "A great mud puddle of a sound with noisy droning guitar and ranted vocals. What made the Dirty Rotten Imbeciles more than the sum of their sledgehammering were their unexpected forays into gentle, lulling music and their sudden, hundred-chord-a-second assaults on that deceptively alluring calm."

== Track listing ==
Dirty Rotten EP

This Side
No.	Title	Length
1.	"Sad To Be"	2:11
2.	"War Crimes"	1:11
3.	"Busted"	0:46
4.	"Draft Me"	0:19
5.	"F.D.R.C."	0:21
6.	"Capitalist Suck"	0:35
7.	"Misery Loves Company"	0:33
8.	"No Sense"	1:16
9.	"Blockhead"	0:55
Total length:		8:07

That Side
No.	Title	Length
1.	"I Don't Need Society"	1:15
2.	"Commuter Man"	0:56
3.	"Plastique"	0:23
4.	"Why"	0:18
5.	"Balance Of Terror"	0:39
6.	"My Fate To Hate"	0:26
7.	"Who Am I"	0:45
8.	"Money Stinks"	0:43
9.	"Human Waste"	0:19
10.	"Yes Ma'am"	0:48
11.	"Dennis's Problem"	0:51
12.	"Closet Punk"	0:31
13.	"Reaganomics"	0:40
Total length:		8:34

Dirty Rotten CD
No.	Title	Length
1.	"I Don't Need Society"	1:20
2.	"Commuter Man"	0:58
3.	"Plastique"	0:25
4.	"Why"	0:21
5.	"Balance Of Terror"	0:42
6.	"My Fate To Hate"	0:28
7.	"Who Am I"	0:49
8.	"Money Stinks"	0:46
9.	"Human Waste"	0:22
10.	"Yes Ma'am"	0:49
11.	"Dennis's Problem"	0:52
12.	"Closet Punk"	0:33
13.	"Reaganomics"	0:43
14.	"Sad To Be"	2:14
15.	"War Crimes"	1:14
16.	"Busted"	0:48
17.	"Draft Me"	0:22
18.	"F.D.R.C."	0:25
19.	"Capitalist Suck"	0:39
20.	"Misery Loves Company"	0:35
21.	"No Sense"	1:18
22.	"Blockhead"	0:57
23.	"Rather Be Sleeping (VATS Demo)"	1:01
24.	"No People (VATS Demo)"	1:59
25.	"Snap (Comp)"	1:15
26.	"Explorer (Comp)"	1:41
27.	"Running Around"	0:58
28.	"Couch Slouch"	1:27
29.	"To Open Closed Doors"	0:31
30.	"Violent Pacification"	2:58
31.	"Radio Interview #1 Part 1"	1:50
32.	"We Are US (Demo)"	0:29
33.	"I Don't Need Society"	1:20
34.	"Radio Interview #1 Part 2"	0:42
35.	"Blockhead (Demo)"	1:07
36.	"Radio Interview #1 Part 3"	0:49
37.	"Radio Interview #2 Part 1"	1:45
38.	"Commuter Man (Demo)"	1:18
39.	"Radio Interview #2 Part 2"	2:21
40.	"Yes Ma'am (Live)"	1:28
41.	"Nursing Home Blues (Live)"	2:02
42.	"Money Stinks (Live)"	1:11
43.	"Louie Louie (Live)"	3:06
44.	"Radio Interview #2 Part 3"	1:17
Total length:		50:15

== Personnel ==
- Kurt Brecht – lead vocals
- Spike Cassidy – guitars, backing vocals
- Dennis Johnson – bass
- Eric Brecht – drums, backing vocals
