= Screams from the Gutter =

Studio album by Raw Power
- Released: 1985
- Recorded: 4–5 September 1984
- Studio: Hit City Midwest, Indianapolis, Indiana
- Genre: Hardcore punk; crossover thrash
- Length: 26:28
- Label: Toxic Shock
- Producer: Raw Power, Paul Mahern

Raw Power chronology
You Are the Victim (1983)	Screams from the Gutter (1985)	After Your Brain (1986)

Screams from the Gutter is the third studio album by Italian hardcore punk band Raw Power, released in 1985 by American independent label Toxic Shock Records.

== Background ==
Based out of Reggio Emilia, Raw Power was founded in 1981 by brothers Mauro (vocals) and Giuseppe Codeluppi (guitar). The band has endured multiple lineup changes throughout the years, with the Codeluppi brothers operating as the core. Raw Power debuted in 1983 with You Are the Victim. While touring in the United States in 1984, the band played in Los Angeles with the Dead Kennedys. It was at that show that they were spotted by Bill Sassenberger, owner of Toxic Shock Records, which resulted in the band signing with the label.

== Reception and sales ==
Professional ratings
Review scores
Source	Rating
AllMusic	5/5 stars

AllMusic editor Eduardo Rivadavia gave the album a perfect five-star rating, describing it as "one of the all-time classics of the '80s crossover movement" and "as seminal a document of '80s crossover as has ever been recorded".

Exclaim! editor Rob Ferraz described the album as "a must have for anyone with even a remote interest in '80s hardcore".

The album sold 40,000 copies in the United States.

== Track listing ==
No.	Title	Length
1.	"State Oppression"	1:31
2.	"Joe's the Best"	0:30
3.	"Bastard"	0:59
4.	"A Certain Kind of Killer"	1:10
5.	"Army"	1:38
6.	"My Boss"	1:20
7.	"No Card"	1:30
8.	"Power"	0:53
9.	"Start A Fight"	2:30
10.	"Don't Let Me See It"	2:27
11.	"Hate"	2:01
12.	"Raw Power"	1:01
13.	"Our Oppression"	1:20
14.	"We're All Gonna Die"	1:44
15.	"Police, Police"	1:06
16.	"Nihilist"	1:23
17.	"Politicians"	2:01
Total length:		26:28

== Personnel ==
- Mauro Codeluppi – vocals
- Davide Devoti – lead guitar
- Giuseppe Codeluppi – rhythm guitar
- Maurizio Dodi – bass
- Helder Stefanini – drums
