= Speak Your Peace =

Studio album by Cryptic Slaughter
- Released: 1990
- Recorded: Dogfish Sound, Newberg, Oregon, USA
- Genre: Crossover thrash
- Length: 33:15
- Label: Metal Blade Records
- Producer: Cryptic Slaughter; Drew Canulette

Cryptic Slaughter chronology
'Stream of Consciousness ' (1988)	Speak Your Peace (1990)

Professional ratings
Review scores
Source	Rating
Allmusic	link

Speak Your Peace is the fourth and final album from crossover thrash/hardcore punk band Cryptic Slaughter. It was released in 1990 on Metal Blade Records and follows 1988's Stream of Consciousness. The band had split up following the 1988 album and remaining member, Les Evans, relocated from California to Oregon and reformed with three new members, including former Wehrmacht drummer, Brian Lehfeldt. The resulting album was quite a change in style for the band, moving from their hardcore punk roots more to a crossover thrash sound, complete with quirky rhythms and melodies. The band split shortly after the release of this album.

== Track listing ==
1. "Born Too Soon" (Dave Hollingsworth, Les Evans, Bret Davis) – 5:15
2. "Still Born, Again" (Hollingsworth, Evans) – 3:32
3. "Insanity by the Numbers" (Hollingsworth, Davis) – 2:39
4. "Co-Exist" (Hollingsworth, Evans, Davis) – 4:10
5. "Deathstyles of the Poor and Lowly" (Hollingsworth, Davis) – 2:00
6. "One Thing or Another" (Hollingsworth, Evans, Davis) – 3:12
7. "Divided Minds" (Hollingsworth, Evans) – 4:24
8. "Speak Your Peace" (Hollingsworth, Evans, Brian Lehfeldt) – 3:20
9. "Killing Time" (Hollingsworth, Evans) – 5:15

== Credits ==
- Dave Hollingsworth – vocals
- Les Evans – guitar
- Bret Davis – bass
- Brian Lehfeldt – drums
- Recorded Dogfish Sound, Newberg, Oregon, USA
- Produced by Cryptic Slaughter and Drew Canulette
- Engineered by Drew Canulette
- Mixed at Pace Video Center, Portland, Oregon, USA
- Cover art by Mike King and Steve Cheese
