= Violent Pacification =

EP by Dirty Rotten Imbeciles
- Released: 1984
- Recorded: November 1983
- Genre: Thrashcore, hardcore punk
- Length: 5:41
- Label: R Radical Records/Dirty Rotten

Dirty Rotten Imbeciles chronology
Dirty Rotten (1983)	Violent Pacification (1984)	Dealing with It! (1985)

Professional ratings
Review scores
Source	Rating
Allmusic	4.5/5 stars

Violent Pacification is an EP by the American crossover thrash band D.R.I., which was released in 1984. The title track on this EP was covered by thrash metal band Slayer on their 1996 album Undisputed Attitude.

== Track listing ==
Dirty Rotten EP

This Side
No.	Title	Length
1.	"Violent Pacification"	2:54
Total length:		2:54

Flip Side
No.	Title	Length
1.	"Running Around"	0:55
2.	"Couch Slouch"	1:23
3.	"To Open Closed Doors"	0:29
Total length:		2:47

== Personnel ==
- Kurt Brecht - lead vocals
- Spike Cassidy - guitars, backing vocals
- Josh Pappe - bass
- Eric Brecht - drums, backing vocals
