= Definition (album) =

Studio album by D.R.I.
- Released: 1992
- Recorded: June–July 1992
- Genre: Crossover thrash
- Length: 49:04
- Label: Rotten
- Producers: Spike Cassidy and Jim (H.M.) Faraci

D.R.I. chronology
Thrash Zone (1989)	Definition (1992)	Full Speed Ahead (1995)

Definition is the sixth album by the American crossover thrash band D.R.I. It was released in 1992.

The band supported the album by touring with Testament.

== Critical reception ==
Professional ratings
Review scores
Source	Rating
AllMusic	2/5 stars
Rock Hard	8.0/10

The Arizona Daily Star wrote that D.R.I.'s "combined fire is stoked by a thrash-metal style and controlled by a social conscience."

== Track listing ==
No.	Title	Length
1.	"Acid Rain"	4:31
2.	"Tone Deaf"	2:28
3.	"Guilt Trip"	4:33
4.	"Hardball"	3:20
5.	"The Application"	4:25
6.	"Paying to Play"	3:00
7.	"Say It"	4:15
8.	"Dry Heaves"	1:35
9.	"Don't Ask"	5:14
10.	"Time Out"	3:40
11.	"Let It Go"	5:18
12.	"You"	1:56
13.	"The Target"	4:49

Bonus tracks

- LP – "Out of Mind"
- Cassette – "Hide Your Eyes"
- CD – "Dry Heaves"

== Credits ==
- Kurt Brecht – vocals
- Spike Cassidy – guitars
- John Menor – bass
- Rob Rampy – drums
