= Born Dead Icons =

Canadian hardcore punk band

- Origin: Montreal, Quebec, Canada
- Genres: Hardcore punk; crust punk; D-beat
- Years active: 1998-2007
- Labels: Dead Alive; Partners in Crime; Trująca Fala; Feral Ward; Dranged; The Great American Steak Religion; Stonehenge; Heartfirst; Busted Heads
- Past members: Francis Lavoie; Pete Beaudoin; Philippe Légaré; Alex Légaré

Born Dead Icons was a Canadian hardcore punk band from Montreal, Quebec, Canada. They played melodic, heavy and dark d-beat hardcore punk with various influences, mainly British bands Amebix, Discharge, Zounds, and Motörhead. They are notable for playing slower and singing more clearly than most bands in this genre. Members also play in the band Complications. The band played their last show in November 2007.

== Members ==
- Francis Lavoie: guitar, vocals
- Pete Beaudoin - guitar
- Philippe Légaré - bass, vocals
- Alex Légaré: drums

== Discography ==
=== Studio albums ===
- Work (2000)
- Salvation on the Knees (2001)
- Ruins (2003)

=== EPs ===
- Part of Something Larger Than Ourselves (1999)
- Modern Plague 7" (2001)
- New Scream Industry (2001)
- Unlearn 7" (2003)

=== Demos ===
- Demo (1999)

=== Splits ===
- Born Dead Icons / Coma
