= Vivisick =

Japanese thrashcore band

- Origin: Tokyo, Japan
- Genres: Thrashcore, bandana thrash
- Years active: 1996–present
- Members: Sunao; Yuki; Kazuki; Haru; Takahashi; Hitoshi
- Past members: Ono; Shoji; Matsuya; Kimura; Morimoto
- Website: vivisick.nobody.jp

Vivisick is a Japanese thrashcore band hailing from Tokyo. Formed in 1996 by bassist/vocalist Yuki and guitarist Sunao, Vivisick has received moderate popularity in Japan, though they remain obscure outside of Japan.

== History ==
Vivisick formed when Yuki and Sunao met and began placing "want ads" in record stores and magazines in search of other band members. Despite early difficulties finding permanent members, they have since established a stable lineup. They released their first album, Respect and Hate, in 2008.

== Personnel ==
=== Current lineup ===
- Sunao - Vocals
- Kazuki - Guitar
- Haru - Guitar
- Takahashi - Bass
- Hitoshi - Drums

=== Previous members ===
- Ono - Guitar
- Shoji - Guitar
- Matsuya - Drums
- Kimura - Drums
- Morimoto - Drums

== Discography ==
=== EPs ===
- Alarm Chain Handle on Opposite Wall, Dan-Doh Records, 1999
- Punks Were Made Before Sounds, Sound Pollution, 2001
- Punks Were Made Before Sounds (re-release), Busted Heads Records, 2004

=== Albums ===
- Respect and Hate, Avail Records / Laja Records / Insane Society Records, 2008

=== Splits ===
- Tomorrow Will Be Worse 3, Sound Pollution, 2002
- Vivisick vs Struck (with Struck), Dan-Doh Records, 2002
- Vivisick vs Mukeka di Rato (with Mukeka di Rato), Sound Pollution, 2004
- Vivisick vs Tropiezo (with Tropiezo, Discos de hoi, 2011

=== Live albums ===
- Landing to Brazil of Japanese Mother Fucker (from their Brazil tour), Laja Records, 2004

=== Compilation albums ===
- Set the apathetic era on fire from 1997-2004, Self-released, 2009 (Rereleased in 2013)
