= Dr and The Crippens =

British hardcore punk band

- Origin: Lancaster, England
- Genres: Hardcore punk, thrashcore
- Years active: 1987–1990; 2001; 2003
- Labels: Manic Ears Records
- Past members: Max Von Reinheart; Tom Crippen; Wayne Crippenski; Jesus Van Gough; BB Kablamo

Dr and The Crippens are a British punk/hardcore band from Lancaster, England, who recorded and toured in the late 1980s and early 1990s. They started life in the summer of 1985 as a 3-piece band with the stated aim of being the 'Lancaster Ramones'. Singer and guitarist Andy Claw left due to his disillusionment with the more hardcore sound the band started to embrace. A new 4-piece line-up emerged in late 1986 and were offered an album deal with Manic Ears Records off the back of 2 demos recorded at Lancaster Musician's Co-Operative. Original drummer Ben re located to London shortly before the album sessions and Dave Ellesmere (Discharge/The Insane) offered to drum following a chance meeting with Wayne at an MDC show. They became known for unusual costumes and innovative use of stage props during their live shows which included frequent use of an exploding head. The band recorded two sessions for Radio 1 DJ John Peel on 8 May 1988 and 16 July 1989.

After a short hiatus, the band re-emerged with a new sound in 1994 in the shape of Krill. Noting a marked change in musical style (The Crippens, but slower...), the stage show remained largely the same, with a healthy dose of pyrotechnics strategically placed inside cabbages. The new genre attracted new fans, but those faithful to Dr and The Crippens remained loyal attendees at live shows, ensuring the last third of all sets contained Crippens favourites. Krill released one studio album 'Beef on the Bone' and split in 2000, playing their last show to a packed crowd at Lancaster's Yorkshire House.

In 2016, after spending time with other projects, Tommy Crippen decided there was a little space in the collective hardcore-punk nostalgia and a healthy appetite in the Japanese punk market to reform the band. Under the abbreviated name The Crippens, the band thawed out its cryogenically frozen head and began playing live again at UK punk/hardcore festivals and venues. The Crippens shows remain true to their original format (loud, irreverent, unexpected props and likelihood of explosions) and continue to record new material in the same vein. Since their reincarnation in 2016, a number of lineup changes have occurred, with a revolving door of past and present members, or those closely linked with the original band taking their turn in creating the chaos of Dr and The Crippens.

== Members ==
Dr and The Crippens

- Andy Claw (Andy Fox) Guitar/Vocals 1985/1986
- BB Kablammo (Ben Robinson) Drums 1985/1987
- Wayne Crippenski (Wayne Elliott) – Bass/Vocals 1985/1993
- Max Von Reinheart (Nick Palmer) - Vocals 1986/1993
- Tommy Crippen (Tom Myall) – Guitar/Vocals 1986/1993
- Jesus Van Gogh (Dave Ellesmere) – Drums/Vocals 1988/1991
- MC Hammered (Loz Hamilton) Drums 1992/1993

Krill

- Max Von Reinheart (Nick Palmer) - Vocals
- Tommy Crippen (Tom Myall) – Guitar/Vocals
- MC Hammered (Loz Hamilton) Drums
- Theo Crippen (Bill Myall) Bass/vocals 1994/1997
- Spanka D Monkey (Mark Morgan) Bass/vocals 1997/2000

The Crippens

- Tommy Crippen (Tom Myall) - Guitar/Vocals
- Theo Crippen (Bill Myall) - Bass/vocals
- Loz Hamilton - Drums (2016/2020
- Bingo Dabber (Kev Baxter) - Vocals (2016/2018)
- Mikey Dohnut (Michael Hodgkins) - Vocals/keyboards (2018/Present)
- Malek Baali - Drums (2021/2023)
- Spanka D Monkey (Mark Morgan) - Drums/vocals (2023/Present)

== Discography ==
=== Studio albums ===
- Fired From The Circus (1988)
- Raphanadosis (1989)
- Beef on The Bone (Krill) 1999 Grimm Products Recordings

=== Live albums ===
- Live Hearts (1992)

=== EPs ===
- Avant Gardening (1989)

=== Singles ===
- "Live" (1989)
- "Turn To Gas" (1991)
- "Slice" / "El Salvador" (1991) split single with Japanese band Juntess

=== Compilations ===
- Digging In Water (1987)
- Hardcore Holocaust - The Peel Sessions (1988)
- The North Atlantic Noise Attack (1989)
- Hardcore Holocaust II - The Peel Sessions (1990)
- Manic Ears - The Histyrical Years '86-'90 (1990)
- Grind Your Mind - A History Of Grindcore (2007)
- Trapped In A Scene UK Hardcore 1985-1989 (2009)
- Cabaret Style (Singles Unreleased Live) (2015)

=== VHS ===
- Live Snit - Live at the Fulham Greyhound, London (1989)
