= Busted Heads Records =

Swedish record label

- Founded: 1997
- Founder: Christoffer Röstlund Jonnson
- Genre: Hardcore punk, Punk
- Country of origin: Sweden

Busted Heads Records was an independent record label operating between 1997 and 2004 in Umeå, Sweden. It released records by both local and worldwide punk and hardcore bands.

The label was run by Christoffer Röstlund Jonsson, then bass player with DS-13, later music journalist for Aftonbladet and Close-Up Magazine, later a member of AC4. Many of the original releases were reissued by other international labels, including Havoc Records.

== Label discography ==
- (no cat number) DS-13 - Aborted Teen Generation 7-inch (later Havoc Records)
- (FUKK 2) Burning Kitchen - Confrontation 7-inch (with Bent Edge / Communichaos Media)
- (no cat number) The (International) Noise Conspiracy / Separation - split 7-inch (with Trust No One Recordings/ Putrid Filth Conspiracy / Black Mask Collective / Bridge Records / La Calavera Discos / Ling Lao Records / T-Recs)
- (BHR#004) Assel - st 7-inch
- (no cat number) Eclipse - The Jehovah Congress 10-inch (with many other labels)
- (BHR#006) Assel / Second Thought - split 7-inch
- (BHR#7) I Quit! - "That's It... I Quit!" 7-inch
- (BHR#8) Nasum / Asterisk* - split 7-inch (with Black Mask Collective / Putrid Filth Conspiracy)
- (BHR#9) Tear It Up / Down In Flames - split 7-inch
- (no cat number) DS-13 - Jag hatar soldater 7-inch flexi
- (BHR#10) Total Fury - "Committed To The Core EP" 7-inch
- (BHR#11) The Dead Ones - "The Busted Heads EP" 7-inch
- (BHR#12) Born Dead Icons / Coma - split7"
- (BHR#13) Municipal Waste - Municipal Waste 7-inch
- (BHR#14) Arroganta Agitatorer - "Arrogans EP" 7-inch (reissue)
- (BHR#15) Spazm 151 - s/t CD
- (BHR#16) Caustic Christ / R.A.M.B.O. - split 7-inch
- (BHR#17) Artimus Pyle / Diallo - split 7-inch
- (BHR#18) Razors Edge - "Thrash march EP" 7-inch
- (BHR#19) Jed Whitey - "This machine kills hippies" 7-inch (with Cage Match Federation)
- (BHR#20) Boxed In - s/t 7-inch
- (BHR#21) Randy - "Cheater" 7-inch
- (BHR#22) Wreckage - "This Is America" 7-inch
- (BHR#23) The Vectors - "Still Ill" LP
- (BHR#24) Trapdoor Fucking Exit - "DOA/Cause & Effect" 7-inch.
- (BHR#25) Regulations - Destroy 7-inch
- (BHR#26) Vivisick - "Punks Were Made Before Sounds" 7-inch
- (BHR#27) Bruce Banner - "I've Had It With Humanity" CD
