= Craig Billmeier =

American musician

Craig "Craigums" Martin Billmeier (born October 18, 1973), also known as Hot Lixx Hulahan, is an American punk musician, multi-instrumentalist, two-time US National Air Guitar Champion (2006 and 2008), and the 2008 World Air Guitar Champion. In 2001 he wrote a book, Naked Shackleton, about his trip to Antarctica. In it, he claims to have visited all seven continents. After his 2006 air guitar victory he was hired as the actor for the video game series Rock Band.

== Bands ==
- Your Mother (vocals, guitar, drums) (1989–2000)
- All You Can Eat (bass, vocals) (1993–1998)
- Rocket Queens (guitar, "Slosh") (1999— )
- What Happens Next? (guitar) (1998–2003)
- FxUxNx
- Virgin Killers (singer)
- Love Songs (vocals, guitar) (2000— )
- Chu Chi Nut Nut and the Pine Cone Express (guitar) (2001)
- Anal Mucus (drums) (2003–2004)
- Colbom (bass) (2003— )
- Conquest For Death (guitar) (2005— )
- This Is My Fist (drums) (2006— )
- Bobby Joe Ebola and the Children MacNuggits (guitar) (2010-- )

== See also ==
- Air guitar
