= Dealing with It! =

Studio album by D.R.I.
- Released: March 1985
- Recorded: 1984 at Rampart Studios (Houston, Texas)
- Genre: Hardcore punk; thrash metal; crossover thrash; thrashcore
- Length: 34:34
- Label: Metal Blade
- Producer: Dan Yeaney

D.R.I. chronology
Violent Pacification (1984)	Dealing with It! (1985)	Crossover (1987)

Professional ratings
Review scores
Source	Rating
AllMusic	3/5 stars

Dealing with It! is the second studio album by the American crossover thrash band D.R.I., which was released in 1985. Although the band started their migration towards a heavy metal influence, this album still retains the band's hardcore punk roots.

== Track listing ==
No.	Title	Length
1.	"Snap"	1:10
2.	"I'd Rather Be Sleeping"	1:12
3.	"Marriage"	0:53
4.	"Yes Ma'am"	1:56
5.	"Soup Kitchen"	2:02
6.	"Mad Man"	1:40
7.	"Stupid, Stupid War"	0:26
8.	"Counter Attack"	1:02
9.	"Couch Slouch"	1:26
10.	"God Is Broke"	1:07
11.	"Karma"	2:16
12.	"Nursing Home Blues"	3:50
13.	"I Don't Need Society"	1:36
14.	"Give My Taxes Back"	0:56
15.	"The Explorer"	1:36
16.	"Reaganomics"	0:46
17.	"How to Act"	1:10
18.	"Shame"	1:09
19.	"Argument Then War"	3:23
20.	"Evil Minds"	0:55
21.	"Slit My Wrist"	0:30
22.	"Busted Again"	0:54
23.	"Equal People"	0:51
24.	"On My Way Home"	1:00
25.	"Bail Out"	0:44

== Credits ==
- Kurt Brecht – vocals
- Spike Cassidy – guitars, bass
- Mikey Offender – bass
- Felix Griffin – drums
