= Rambo (band) =

American punk rock band

- Origin: Philadelphia, Pennsylvania, U.S.
- Genres: Punk rock, hardcore punk, thrashcore, crust punk
- Years active: 1999–2007, 2019–current
- Labels: Havoc, 625 Thrashcore, Ed Walters, Relapse
- Members: Tony Croasdale; Andy Wheeler; Bull Gervasi; Jared Shavelson
- Past members: Beau Brendley; Jeremy Gewertz; John Robinson; Todd Hoffman; Mike Bukowski; Dave Rosenstraus; Mick Brochau

Rambo (stylized on-screen as R.A.M.B.O.) are an American punk rock band based in Philadelphia. The band identified with the anarchist, crust punk, cyclist and thrashcore movements. Known for hectic live performances, the band toured extensively in the United States, Europe, Australia and Southeast Asia, including several sections of the latter continent previously unvisited by touring Western rock bands.

== History ==
R.A.M.B.O. was formed in 1999 by singer Tony Croasdale (known as Tony Pointless), guitarist Andy Wheeler, bassist Beau Brendley and drummer Jeremy Gewertz, the latter two of whom played in Philadelphia-based hardcore band Kill The Man Who Questions. Croasdale was known in the city's punk rock scene for his involvement with the underground venue Stalag 13, and would later co-run a summer music fest that became unofficially known as the Pointless Fest. Initially, the group performed in camouflage face paint and military fatigue, but following the events of 9/11, ceased this policy in fear of its presenting "the wrong" (i.e., a pro-American militancy) message.

In 2000, Brendley and Gewertz left the group. Gewertz would go on to play with An Albatross, Brendley with El Toro de Oro. They were replaced by Bull Gervasi (formerly of Policy Of Three) and Todd Hoffman (of Virginia Black Lung and the Fighting Dogs), respectively; the lineup was rounded out by second guitarist John Robinson (a former member of Good Clean Fun). Artist Mike Bukowski soon started being considered a member of the band in the capacity of "propagandist" and relating to the group as did Gee Vaucher to Crass.

Robinson, Hoffman, and Bukowski would go on to leave the group one by one, leaving Croasdale, Wheeler, Gervasi, and drummer Dave Rosenstrauss (along with Mick Brochu, a part-time live guitarist) as the group's final lineup before disbanding in 2007.

The band maintains that they didn’t break up because of conflicts within the band. No member has ever been kicked out or quit in anger. The band started as a joke, therefore not all original members were prepared to commit to touring. The band decided to go on indefinite hiatus to focus on other aspects of their life.

Wheeler became a successful cinematographer. His films include:”Shoplifters of the World”, “Gods Country”, and “Eric laRue”. Gervasi trained as an electrician, and purchased land in the New Jersey Pine Barrens, where he lives in a shack like the UNI Bomber. Croasdale finished college, and pursued a master's degree in biology. He directs a Nature Center, is an adjunct ecology professor, he is the co-host of the Urban Wildlife Podcast, and is writing a field guide on urban wildlife to be published by Cornell University.

The three core members consider themselves best friends, and missed collaborating together. They began writing a new album in 2019. Dave was asked to drum on the recordings but declined as he was busy with his family. Jared Shavelson was asked to drum as he lives in Los Angeles and could collaborate easily with Wheeler. R.A.M.B.O. Unleashed “Defy Extinction” on Relapse Records in December 2022. They played their first show in 17 years at C.Y. Fest in Los Angeles in September 2024. Derik Moore of Citizens Arrest, Fright, Grey Cell, etc filled in on drums. Josh Agarn of Paint It Black played second guitar. Tony tore his plantaris muscle-tendon during the set.

R.A.M.B.O. produced three full-lengths; Wall of Death the System, on the 625 Thrashcore label,Bring It!, on Havoc Records, and “Defy Extinction” on Relaspse Records. The band was also known for its unrelenting and widespread touring, as well as its theatrical live shows featuring many cardboard props depicting humorous-yet-political scenarios based around their anarcho-syndicalist convictions.

== Discography ==
=== Tapes ===
- "No Circle Pits in Heaven" (self-released)

=== EPs ===
- Split 7" with Crucial Unit – (Ed Walters Records)
- Split 7" with Caustic Christ – (Busted Heads Records / Havoc Records)

=== Albums ===
- Wall of Death the System (625 Thrashcore, 2001)
- Bring It! (Havoc Records, 2005)
- Defy Extinction (Relapse Records, 2022)
