= Raphanadosis =

Studio album by Dr and The Crippens
- Released: 1989
- Recorded: Feb/March 1989 at Sam Studios, Bristol UK
- Genre: Hardcore punk
- Label: Manic Ears

Dr and The Crippens chronology
Fired From The Circus (1988)	Raphanadosis (1989)

Rapahanadosis is the second album by British hardcore punk band Dr and The Crippens.

The album cover features the legend 'Snit,' leading some people to believe the album title was actually Snit; indeed, a live video recorded at the Fulham Greyhound, London, was entitled Live Snit.

== Track listing ==
1. Garden Centre Murders - 2:22
2. Bench - 0:18
3. Braindead - 1:46
4. Zombies In Disneyland - 2:08
5. Epic - 0:08
6. The Elvis Shroud - 1:52
7. Enter The Garden - 2:12
8. I'm So Dumb - 1:15
9. G-Plan 9 From Outer Space - 3:27
10. My Brother Is A Headcase - 1:49
11. Henenlotter - 1:22
12. Anti-Christ On Button Moon - 3:12
13. Kid With The Removable Face - 1:40
14. Greenfinger - 1:55
15. Fire Prevention - 0:18
16. Song For Guy - 2:36
17. Skintight - 2:13
18. 8 Years In Office - 0:05
19. Jimmy Goes To Egypt - 1:08
20. Podbreath - 1:32
21. Extreme Noise T - 0:23
22. Nightmare On Sesame Street - 3:20

Extended CD version (John Peel Session bonus tracks)

23. Pink Machine Gun - 1:26
24. The Ballad Of Farmer Vincent - 1:48
25. Garden Centre Murders - 1:52
26. Peely Backwards - 1:22
27. Skintight (Peel Session Version) - 2:22
28. Ode To A Slug - 0:53
29. Pneumatic Geek - 2:21
30. Death Squad - 1:45
31. Jimmy Goes To Egypt (Peel Session Version) - 0:57
32. Don't Look In The Freezer - 1:25
33. Mindsurf - 02:02
34. Experiment Conclusion - 0:09

== Personnel ==
- Wayne Crippenski - Bass, Vocals
- Jesus Van Gogh - Drums, Backing Vocals
- Tom Crippen - Guitar, Backing Vocals
- Max Von Reinhead - Vocals

Produced by Doctor And The Crippens and Mr. Soots
