= Guyana Punch Line =

American hardcore punk band

- Origin: Columbia, South Carolina, U.S.
- Genres: Hardcore punk, thrashcore, powerviolence
- Years active: 1998–2003
- Labels: Prank, Coalition, When Humans Attack, X-Mas
- Past members: Chris Bickel; Kevin Byrd; Troy Thames; Matt Thompson; Drew Wallace

Guyana Punch Line was an American hardcore punk band from Columbia, South Carolina, active from 1998 until 2003.

== History ==
Guyana Punch Line was formed of members who had previously played in In/Humanity, Antischism and .fuckingcom. Evolving past In/Humanity's tongue-in-cheek professed "emo violence" genre and lyrical jabs, Guyana Punch Line worked to bring Chris Bickel's "Smashism" ideals to the masses through heavy, hard confusion music. The band embarked on what they called a "campaign to scare the hell out of middle America", including an infamous "Walk for Smashism" parade. The band name is a pun on the notorious Jonestown incident.

The band has been defunct since the release of Direkt Aktion, with members going on to form and/or work on bands such as Confederate Fagg. Vocalist Chris Bickel would go on to work for the Nickelodeon Theater.

== Band members ==
- Chris Bickel – vocals
- Kevin Byrd – guitar
- Troy Thames – drums
- Matt Thompson – bass
- Drew Wallace – bass (on Direkt Aktion)

== Discography ==
=== Albums ===
- Maximum Smashism CD/LP (1999 Prank Records)
- Irritainment – Songs to Disturb the Comfortable and Comfort the Disturbed CD/LP (2001 Prank Records)
- Direkt Aktion CD/LP (2003 Prank Records)

=== EPs ===
- Irritainment for the Masses 7" (2000 X-Mist Records)
- Sounds for the New Youth Aesthetic 7" (2001 Coalition Records)
- Null Transmission 7" (2002 When Humans Attack Records)
