= Full Speed Ahead (D.R.I. album) =

Studio album by D.R.I.
- Released: November 14, 1995
- Recorded: 1994–1995
- Genre: Crossover thrash
- Length: 72:44
- Label: Rotten Records
- Producer: Spike Cassidy

D.R.I. chronology
Live (1994)	Full Speed Ahead (1995)	The Dirty Rotten Power (2001)

Full Speed Ahead is the seventh and final studio album by the American crossover thrash band D.R.I., released in 1995. The band's former roadie, Chumly Porter, played bass.

The album was not a commercial success. D.R.I. supported it by touring with Acid Bath.

After the album's release, the band decided that they would no longer record any new music; however, they recorded and released the track "Against Me" in 2003. D.R.I. would not release any material until 2016, with the EP But Wait... There's More!

== Critical reception ==
Professional ratings
Review scores
Source	Rating
Rock Hard	8.0/10

The Charlotte Observer called the album "teeth-gnashing thrash-core," writing that the "pulverizing, heavy guitar chords collide with rat-tat-tat drumming for World War III." The Arizona Daily Star noted that the album title "is a testament to [D.R.I.'s] unrelenting attack." The Wisconsin State Journal wrote that the band's "still blindly and wantonly cranking out metallic, old-school, hard-core punk rock."

== Track listing ==
No.	Title	Length
1.	"Problem Addict"	1:39
2.	"I'm the Liar"	4:13
3.	"Under the Overpass"	3:24
4.	"They Don't Care"	4:53
5.	"Drawn and Quartered"	2:30
6.	"No End"	3:33
7.	"Wages of Sin"	2:15
8.	"Syringes in the Sandbox"	3:40
9.	"Who Am I?"	0:47
10.	"Girl with a Gun"	4:29
11.	"Dead Meat"	4:03
12.	"Down to the Wire"	3:14
13.	"Level 7"	3:29
14.	"Broke"	0:45
15.	"Sucker"	3:31
16.	"Underneath the Surface"	26:19

== Note ==
"Underneath the Surface" is a 4:56 song. There is a 20 minute silence before a one minute instrumental tune is played.

== Credits ==
- Kurt Brecht – vocals
- Spike Cassidy – guitars
- Chumly Porter – bass
- Rob Rampy – drums
