= Cryptic Slaughter =

American crossover thrash band

- Also known as: Lowlife (2018–2021)
- Origin: Santa Monica, California, U.S.
- Genres: Crossover thrash; thrashcore; hardcore punk
- Years active: 1984–1988; 1989–1990; 2002–2003; 2021–present
- Labels: Metal Blade; Relapse
- Members: Les Evans; Scott Peterson; Brad Mowen; Matt Olivo; Menno Verbaten
- Past members: Bill Crooks; Bret Davis; Dave Hollingsworth; Brian Lehfeldt; Rob Nicholson

Cryptic Slaughter is an American crossover thrash band based in Santa Monica, California, and originally formed in 1984. The band are regarded as influential in hardcore punk and crossover thrash, being dubbed "the original speedcore merchants".

== Biography ==
Cryptic Slaughter was formed in 1984 by Les Evans (age 17), Scott Peterson (age 14), and Adam Scott (age 15), who met through their mutual participation in the American Youth Soccer League (AYSO). Soon they were joined by Bill Crooks (age 15), a friend of Adam Scott and a fellow soccer player. Adam Scott was let go a few months later due to conflicts regarding his parents and school.

Their first demo, Life in Grave, was produced in 1985 and became well circulated in the burgeoning tape-trader underground. Their first full-length LP, Convicted, was released in 1986 on Death/Metal Blade records, whose artist roster also boasted D.R.I., Corrosion of Conformity, Dr. Know, The Mentors, and Beyond Possession. Within its first year of release, Convicted sold over 25,000 copies and earned Cryptic Slaughter the reputation as being one of the fastest bands in hardcore, with the album being described as, "a violently giddy, adrenalin-charged half hour, every single cut spewing a torrent of anti-establishment bile and fury."

After Convicted, the band recorded and released Money Talks in 1987, which is often considered a breakthrough in the band's career. Money Talks surpassed Convicted's success by selling 35,000 in its first year, earning a dedicated following for the band. Writing for Allmusic, Eduardo Rivadavia would say, "Longtime fans will always bicker over favorites, but there seems to exist a split decision between that landmark first effort Convicted and its worthy successor, 1987's Money Talks," concluding, "Simply put, with its tightly wound construction highlighting the nervous tension between punk and metal at euphoric new levels, Money Talks remains a peerless example of '80s hardcore."

The original line-up recorded their final studio album, Stream of Consciousness, in 1988. Unhappy with the recording process and the album's production, the band's internal problems were magnified by life on the road. They broke up in the summer on tour before Stream was released later that fall. They played their last show in Detroit on July 14, 1988.

Shortly after returning home, however, guitarist Les Evans and bassist Rob Nicholson recruited new member Eli Nelson and continued on in a new direction. This new incarnation was short-lived, however, and Evans moved to Portland in May 1989 to reform the band with an entirely new line-up. The final Cryptic Slaughter album, Speak Your Peace (1990), was a definite departure from the previous material, heavily influenced by a changing music scene.

In 2003, Relapse Records reissued Convicted and Money Talks with added bonus tracks from Cryptic Slaughter's demo and live recordings.

In 2018, for legal reasons, the band changed its name to Lowlife and continued to tour, until October 2021, when Lowlife reverted its name back to Cryptic Slaughter. They were planning on releasing their first studio album in more than three decades in 2022, though there have been no updates on it since then.

== Musical Style ==
Cryptic Slaughter's musical style has been described as Crossover thrash, Thrashcore, Thrash metal, and Hardcore punk. They are often credited as pioneers of Crossover, alongside other bands such as Suicidal Tendencies, D.R.I. and Stormtroopers of Death.

== Members ==
=== Current members ===
- Les Evans – guitar (1984–1990, 2002–2003, 2021–present), bass (1988–1999, 2002–2003)
- Scott Peterson – drums (1984–1988, 2021–present)
- Brad Mowen – vocals (2021–present)
- Dave Webb – guitar (2022-present)
- Menno Verbaten – bass (2021–present)

=== Former members ===
- Dave Hollingsworth – vocals (1989–1990)
- Adam Scott – guitar (1984–1985)
- Bill Crooks – vocals (1984–1988)
- Rob Nicholson – bass (1984–1988)
- Bret Davis – bass (1989–1990)
- Brian Lehfeldt – drums (1989–1990, 2002–2003)
- Chris Merrow – vocals (2002–2003)
- Matt Olivo – guitars (2021)

Timeline

== Discography ==
=== Studio albums ===
- Convicted (1986)
- Money Talks (1987)
- Stream of Consciousness (1988)
- Speak Your Peace (1990)

=== EPs ===
- Band in S.M. (2003)

=== Demos ===
- Life in Grave (1985)
