= 4 of a Kind =

Studio album by D.R.I.
- Released: 1988
- Recorded: February–March 1988
- Genre: Crossover thrash
- Length: 35:17
- Label: Metal Blade
- Producer: Spike Cassidy and Bill Metoyer

D.R.I. chronology
Crossover (1987)	4 of a Kind (1988)	Thrash Zone (1989)

Professional ratings
Review scores
Source	Rating
AllMusic	2.5/5 stars

4 of a Kind is the fourth album by the American crossover thrash band D.R.I., which was released in 1988 through Metal Blade Records. The album features the song "Suit And Tie Guy", which had a music video made for it. It was the first D.R.I. song to get a video. The album would go on to be D.R.I's first to chart on the Billboard 200, peaking at #116.

Loudwire listed it as one of the greatest releases on Metal Blade Records.

== Track listing ==
No.	Title	Length
1.	"All for Nothing"	3:56
2.	"Manifest Destiny"	2:38
3.	"Gone Too Long"	2:20
4.	"Do the Dream"	2:36
5.	"Shut-Up!"	2:47
6.	"Modern World"	4:22
7.	"Think for Yourself"	4:43
8.	"Slumlord"	1:53
9.	"Dead in a Ditch"	0:49
10.	"Suit and Tie Guy"	3:44
11.	"Man Unkind"	5:29

== Credits ==
- Kurt Brecht – vocals
- Spike Cassidy – guitars
- Josh Pappe – bass
- Felix Griffin – drums
