= S.O.B. (band) =

Japanese punk band

- Origin: Osaka, Japan
- Genres: Thrashcore; hardcore punk; grindcore
- Years active: 1983–present
- Labels: Rise Above; Selfish; Virgin; Toy's Factory; Specialized Fact; Sound of Burial
- Members: Etsushi; Kawataka Daisuke; Toshimi Seki; Satoshi Yasue
- Past members: Kazuki Daido; Naoto Fukuhara; Yoshitomo 'Tottsuan' Suzuki

S.O.B. (abbreviated from Sabotage Organized Barbarian) is a Japanese punk rock band formed in Osaka in 1983. Their original vocalist Yoshitomo "Tottsuan" Suzuki committed suicide in 1995. They are also considered hugely influential on grindcore bands such as Napalm Death and the genre of death metal as well as one of the mainstays of the thrashcore genre. The band have sometimes been described as grindcore, themselves.

== Discography ==
Albums

- 1987 – Don't Be Swindle
- 1988 – No Control
- 1990 – What's the Truth?
- 1993 – Gate of Doom
- 1994 – Vicious World
- 1995 – Symphonies of Brutality
- 1999 – Dub Grind
- 2003 – Still Grind Attitude

EPs

- Sabotage Organized Barbarian (1985)
- Leave Me Alone (1986)
- Western Kids Omnibus 2 (Coke) (1986)
- split w/ Napalm Death (1988)

== Members ==
Current line-up

- Etsushi – lead vocals (2002–present)
- Kawataka Daisuke – bass (1983–1986; 1990–present)
- Toshimi Seki – guitar (1983–present)
- Satoshi Yasue – drums (1983–present)

Past members

- Kazuki Daido – bass (1986–1990)
- Naoto Fukuhara – lead vocals (1995–2002)
- Yoshitomo 'Tottsuan' Suzuki – lead vocals (1983–1995)
