= Straight Ahead (band) =

American hardcore punk band

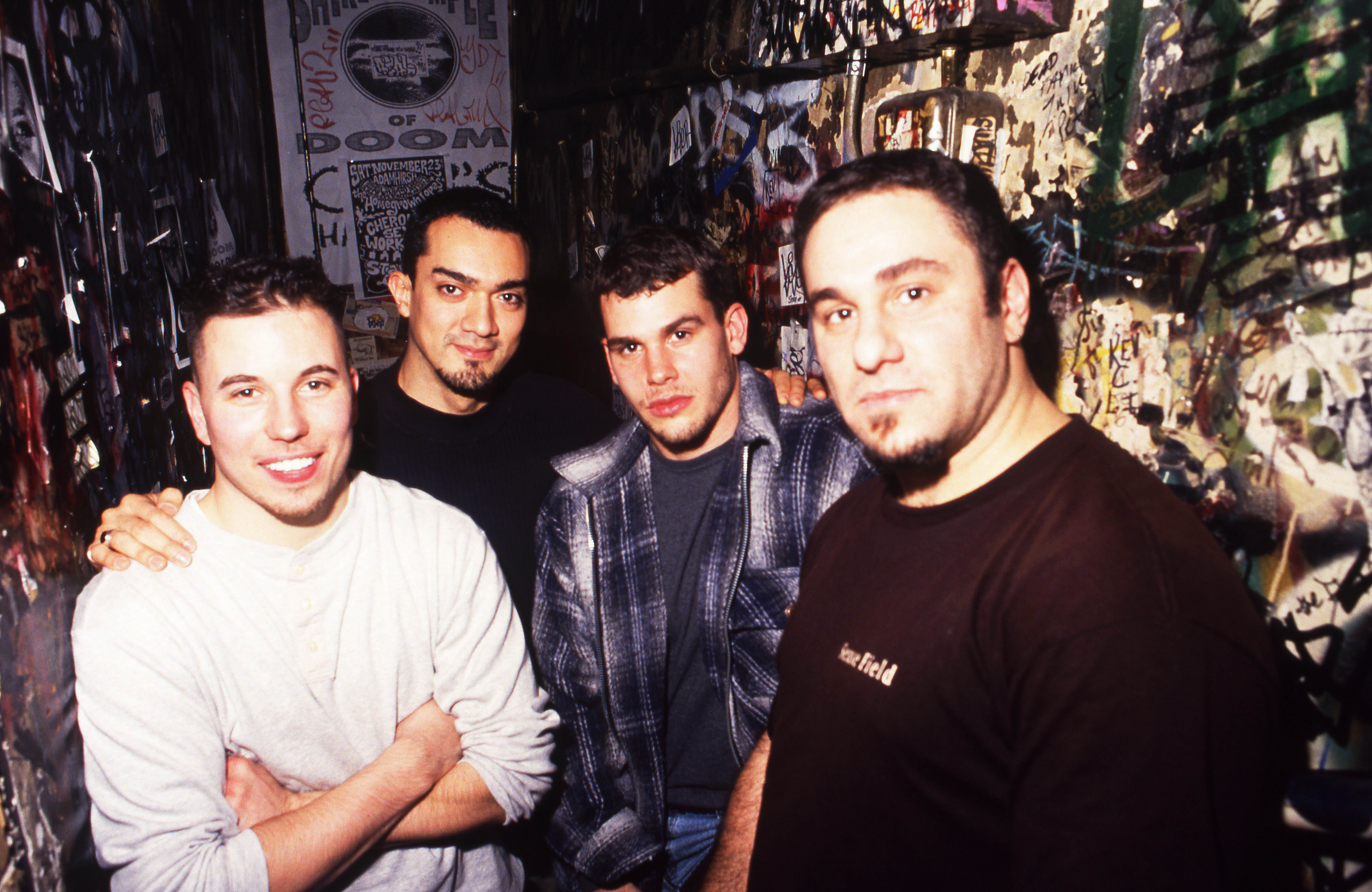
- Members of Straight Ahead posing together at CBGB in 1996, left to right: Setari, Echeverria, Carroll & Majidi

Background information
- Origin: New York City, New York, U.S.
- Genres: Hardcore punk; crossover thrash
- Spinoff of: N.Y.C. Mayhem; Rest in Pieces
- Past members: Tommy Carroll; Rob Echeverria; Craig Setari; Armand Majidi

Straight Ahead was an American straight edge hardcore punk band formed in Manhattan, New York City in early 1986 by vocalist Tommy Carroll, guitarist Rob Echeverria, bassist Craig Setari, and drummer Armand Majidi.

== History ==
Straight Ahead was formed when N.Y.C. Mayhem drummer / vocalist Tommy Carroll and bassist Craig Setari broke ranks with guitarist Gordon Ancis, to form a new band with Carroll on vocals only. They enlisted guitarist Rob Echeverria and drummer Armand Majidi, who at the time was singer and guitarist of New York Hardcore band Rest in Pieces, and go on to be the drummer in Sick of it All. At its inception, most of the songs played by Straight Ahead were reworked versions of N.Y.C. Mayhem material performed with different lyrics, because the message and direction of Straight Ahead was aligned with the more positive-minded straight edge movement. This transitional period has blurred some perceptions of the two very distinct bands, leading some to think that they were somehow one and the same. The fact that Tommy Carroll and Craig Setari played in N.Y.C. Mayhem does not make the two bands synonymous. At no point were Gordon Ancis and previous N.Y.C. Mayhem bassist Tony Shimkin part of the Straight Ahead line up.

Straight Ahead quickly gained popularity by contributing nine tracks to the 1986 One Step Ahead Records compilation EP "End the Warzone," which also featured bands Lärm, Pilsbury Hardcore and Attitude Adjustment. Because Majidi had very little experience on drums when the recording was done, Carroll recorded the drums tracks, and credited himself as "XXX" in the liner notes.

They played their first show on March 3rd, 1986 at February's in Elmont, NY with Loud & Boistrous and S.F.A., and the flyer describes Straight Ahead as "formerly N.Y.C. Mayhem" to ensure people understood Carroll and Setari's connection to their previous band and knew what kind of music to expect.

Straight Ahead drew intense regional interest because of their high energy live shows, playing numerous times in the New York area, mostly at the now legendary CBGB hardcore matinees. From 1986 into 1987, Carroll and Setari would also join Youth of Today and play for both bands, once on the same day at the same show at the Right Track Inn on Long Island.

Straight Ahead continued to build momentum in 1987, which saw the band expand its touring to include shows in Connecticut, Buffalo and Toronto, Canada; A short weekend jaunt which the band called the "Spirit of Youth" tour. They put out another EP titled "Breakaway," released jointly by I Risk Records and Some Records, which announced a lyrical departure from the straight edge focus heard previously. As the band evolved, individual differences and ideas on musical direction led to their breakup in the early summer of 1987, which occurred during a recording session at the Don Fury Spring Street studio location, which meant that their final gig was played on May 3, 1987, playing one reunion gig in 1988 at the "For Pete's Sake" benefit at CBGB.

On the Hardlore podcast bassist Craig Setari confirmed Straight Ahead will play two shows in Brooklyn on April 25th and 26th of 2026 as support of Gorilla Biscuits.

== Musical style and legacy ==
Straight Ahead are considered a hardcore punk and crossover thrash band. Because they rose from the ashes of N.Y.C. Mayhem and performed reworked material, there is a connection between the two bands which meant their stylistic legacy could be considered an influence to musicians from quite a few different genres.

== Lineup ==
- Tommy Carroll – lead vocals
- Rob Echeverria – guitar
- Craig Setari – bass
- Armand Majidi – drums

== Discography ==
=== EPs ===
- End the Warzone (1986)
- Breakaway (1987)

=== Live demos ===
- CBGB 3/16/86 (1986)
- Albany 6/22/86 (1986)
- CBGB 7/20/86 (1986)
- CBGB 3/21/87 (1987)
- CBGB 5/3/87 (1987)
