= Crossover (Dirty Rotten Imbeciles album) =

Studio album by D.R.I.
- Released: March 9, 1987
- Recorded: 1986–1987 at Stagg Street, Van Nuys, California
- Genre: Crossover thrash, hardcore punk
- Length: 39:18
- Label: Metal Blade
- Producer: Spike Cassidy and Bill Metoyer

D.R.I. chronology
Dealing with It! (1985)	Crossover (1987)	4 of a Kind (1988)

Professional ratings
Review scores
Source	Rating
AllMusic	3/5 stars

Crossover is the third album by the American crossover thrash band D.R.I., originally released in 1987. The genre "crossover" was coined from this release.

On April 13, 2010, the album was re-released on vinyl, CD, and digital download as a remastered version with 11 bonus tracks, 6 of which were recorded live at the Ritz in New York City. The album was remastered by original producer Bill Metoyer.

The album includes the song "Five Year Plan" which has become a staple of their shows ever since

== Track listing ==
On vinyl releases the track "Outro" is not mentioned as a separate song. It is a separate track only on digital releases.

No.	Title	Length
1.	"The Five Year Plan"	4:03
2.	"Tear it Down"	3:38
3.	"A Coffin"	0:58
4.	"Probation"	4:05
5.	"I.D.K.Y."	1:28
6.	"Decisions"	5:02
7.	"Hooked"	2:44
8.	"Go Die!"	3:42
9.	"Redline"	3:06
10.	"No Religion"	2:59
11.	"Fun and Games"	2:13
12.	"Oblivion"	4:54
13.	"Outro"	0:23

=== 2010 Millennium Edition bonus tracks ===
14. "The Five Year Plan" (Live at the Ritz) – 4:01
15. "Redline" (Live at the Ritz) – 3:03
16. "Fun and Games" (Live at the Ritz) – 2:08
17. "Tear it Down" (Live at the Ritz) – 3:48
18. "Probation" (Live at the Ritz) – 3:53
19. "Go Die" (Live at the Ritz) – 3:53
20. "The Five Year Plan" (Demo) – 3:57
21. "Fun and Games" (Demo) – 2:14
22. Kurt (Interview) – 3:21
23. Spike (Interview) – 4:23
24. Josh and Felix (Interview) – 2:50

== Credits ==
- Kurt Brecht – vocals
- Spike Cassidy – guitars
- Josh Pappe – bass
- Felix Griffin – drums
