= What Happens Next? (band) =

American thrashcore band

- Origin: San Francisco, California, U.S.
- Genres: Thrashcore; bandana thrash
- Years active: 1998–2003
- Labels: Lengua Armada Discos; 625 Thrashcore
- Past members: Devon Morf; Robert Collins; Craig Billmeier; Max Ward

What Happens Next? was an American thrashcore band from the San Francisco Bay Area, California. They were known for their DIY ethic, anticonsumerism and worldwide unity, as well as energetic performances.

== Band members ==
=== Final line-up ===
- Devon Morf – vocals
- Robert Collins – bass
- Craig Billmeier – guitar
- Max Ward – drums

== Discography ==
=== Albums ===
| Title | Format | Release date | Notes |
|---|---|---|---|
| WHN? | 7 inch | December 1998 | |
| Hollow Victory | 10 inch | April 1999 | Comes with a large fold-out insert |
| Old Stuff From The Old School | Cassette | December 1999 | The First Year; Intended to be a dubbed cassette passed throughout Asia and Eastern Europe |
| The First Year | CD | January 2000 | Contains the first 7in, the "Hollow Victory" 10 inch, some comp tracks, a live show, and a 12-page booklet. Cassette version was released in February 2001. |
| Brutiful Fearing | 6 inch | January 2000 | |
| Standfast Armageddon Justice Fighter | CD/LP | August 2000 | LP contains poster, CD contains CD-ROM |
| Standfast 2000 | 7 inch | August 2000 | A compendium to the full-length, includes Deathside cover |
| Ahora Mas Que Nunca | 7 inch | October 2000 | |
| The Second Year | CD | February 2001 | Brutiful Fearing, Ahora Mas Que Nunca, and the Standfast 2000 EP on CD |
| El Segundo Ano E Alguna Outra Caca | CD | February 2002 | For Brazil tour |
| Euro Trash | 7 inch | May 2003 | |
| No Cash?... No Thrash! | 7 inch | May 2003 | |

=== Splits and compilations ===
Splits

| With | Format | Release date |
|---|---|---|
| OvertHHHrow | CD | November 2000 |
| Life's Halt | LP/CD | June 2001 |

Compilation albums

| Title | With | Format |
|---|---|---|
| Abundante Ruido Subterraneo | ARZ, Mortero (both from Perú), WHN? and SxTxD | 4 way split CD |
| Thrash Revenge on Skull Island | Sacrelige BC, Abigail (from Japan), Violent Coercion (pre-Neurosis), WHN? and Conquest For Death (WHN? with Kiku from CHARM playing drums) | 7 inch on Wajlemac |
| Bandana Thrash Vol. 1 | Flash Gordon, Lie, Crucial Section | 7 inch flexi |
| Memories of Tomorrow | Life's Halt, No Justice, DIrty Dirt & the Dirts, Varsity and 12 others | LP/CD |
| Short, Fast + Loud Vol. 1 | 40 bands, 40 songs, 13 countries, and 100 pictures | CD |
| SK8 or Die | Life's Halt, Fistfull, No Reply, Dirty Dirt & the Dirts | 7 inch |
| Death to Hardcore, Death to Reagan | MDC, Crucial Unit, MCD-182, Total Fury and 15 more | LP |
| Dark Thoughts – A Tribute to C.O.C. | Municipal Waste, Holier Than Thou, Caustic Christ | |

== Associated acts ==
- Conquest for Death (Morf, Collins, Billmeier)
- Spazz (Ward)
- Artimus Pyle (Collins)
- Love Songs (Billmeier)
- Your Mother (Billmeier)
- Fuckface (Collins)
- All You Can Eat (Morf, Billmeier)
- Colbom (Morf, Billmeier)
- High on Crime (Collins)
- Capitalist Casualties (Ward)
- Scholastic Deth (Ward)
- Boo!Hiss!Pfft! (Morf)
