= Raw Power (band) =

Italian hardcore punk band

Background information
- Origin: Reggio Emilia, Italy
- Genres: Hardcore punk; crossover thrash
- Years active: 1981–present
- Labels: F.O.A.D.; Beer City
- Members: Mauro Codeluppi; Paolo di Bernardo; Marco Massarenti; Gianmarco Agosti
- Past members: See below
- Website: rawpowerhardcore.com

Raw Power is an Italian hardcore punk band from Reggio Emilia, formed in 1981.

== History ==
Raw Power was formed in 1981 in Poviglio in the Italian province of Reggio Emilia by brothers Mauro (vocals) and Giuseppe Codeluppi (guitar). Through the years the band has lived through several line-up changes and the two brothers were the only stable members until Giuseppe's death in 2002. The band's name came from The Stooges's third album. Previously, the Codeluppi brothers had played in another band called Off Limits. Other members in Raw Power's first line-up were Silvio (guitar and vocals), bassist Maurizio Dodi (who came from punk band Chelsea Hotel) and teenager drummer Helder Stefanini.

In 1983 they recorded a 19-track demo (sometimes referred as Brown Studio Tape) and two songs appeared in the Italian punk compilation, Raptus. The tape also included the song "Fuck Authority", which appeared in Maximumrocknroll's international punk and hardcore compilation, Welcome to 1984. Their debut album, You Are The Victim, was released in 1983 (or 1984, depending on sources) through the same small independent Italian label that released the Raptus compilation (Meccano Records). Raw Power had another two tracks in the second Raptus compilation, Raptus: Negazione e superamento (1984).

A small tape label from San Diego in the U.S. called BCT Tapes released in 1984 their demo (untitled, aka Brown Studio Tape) and some of their live material on the Last White Christmas compilations (recorded in December 1983). Through the BCT contact, in the same year the band flew over to the States for their first US tour, which happened in August–September 1984 (the band have since then returned to tour the U.S. a total of six times). Second guitarist Silvio was replaced by Davide (ex-Chelsea Hotel) before the tour.

While touring in the U.S. in 1984, the band played in Los Angeles with punk legends Dead Kennedys. It was at that show that they were spotted by Bill Sassenberger, owner of Toxic Shock Records. The band signed a record deal with Bill, which resulted in the album Screams from the Gutter, which sold more than 40,000 copies strictly through independent distribution and shops. Almost simultaneously, BCT released a Live in the USA tape (BCT 17, 3/85), compiling some of their best shows.

In 1986, Toxic Shock Records released the EP Wop Hour and the LP After Your Brain.

In 1987, Raw Power appeared on the compilation album "Rat Music For Rat People", recorded in San Francisco by producer Sylvia Massy at CD Presents.

In the years to come, other records including Mine To Kill (Southern Records, 1989), Live Danger (TVOR Records, 1991) and Too Tough to Burn (Contempo Records, 1992) were released, but none of them sold as respectively as the first two recordings on Toxic Shock.

During their tours in the U.S. Raw Power have shared the stage with the Circle Jerks, Adolescents, D.O.A., Bad Brains, Agnostic Front, Minor Threat, Dead Kennedys, Suicidal Tendencies, among many others. In 1986 in a small club in Seattle, Guns N' Roses opened for Raw Power.

In 1995 they recorded the Fight album for Godhead Records, trying to achieve a sound more akin to their live shows. A video clip was made to promote the album, which was broadcast by MTV. Their next album for Godhead was Live from the Gutter, recorded live on 1 March 1996 at the Maffia Club in Reggio Emilia. It contains twenty-seven songs with no overdubs.

In 1998 the band came back to Bill and Toxic Shock Records, who had changed its name to Toxic Ranch Records, releasing Reptile House. Reviews of the record calling it the best thing the band had done since their debut release. With that, the band decided to return to the U.S. for their first tour in several years. It was at that time that they met a long time Raw Power fan named Tony Patino. A person that would be instrumental for the band in the next few years.

The 1998 tour, which was organized by Patino, started and ended in New York City, and covered most of the eastern states. It was on the first night of that tour that the band stored some of their gear in the support bands vehicle, only to find out the next day that some of their guitars were stolen. The support band, The Infected, a then unknown band from Lexington, Kentucky, had mistakenly parked their van and left it unattended in New Jersey, and had to explain how they did not have Giuseppe's Gibson Les Paul that he had played for roughly twenty years.

In the late 1998, Marco Massarenti joined the band, replacing bassist Alessandro Paolucci.

Another tour of the states was underway the following year, but had to be scrapped midway through when Mauro was hospitalized in Indianapolis. He was suffering from kidney stones and had to have a stone surgically removed. Several dates on the tour had to be canceled due to the nature of his illness, which made it nearly impossible for him to sing.

In 2000 Alessandro Ronchini replaced Marco Massarenti and Raw Power released their next album "Trust Me" on Hello Records, a label that Patino, their American booking agent had started. This was the first recording since "Fight" that Silvio played guitar for the band. Just as the album was released, they hit American soil once again. This time, the tour support was a radical band from Los Angeles called Tongue, featuring a female vocalist/artist named Liz Mcgrath. The tour started in Los Angeles rather than New York, and the West coast welcomed the band with open arms. It was their most successful American tour since the first one in 1984.

The following year, in 2001, the band toured the states once again, supporting the "Trust Me" release. This time with old 1985 tour mates, Decry supporting. The tour started in Atlanta and ended in Denver, and was the last time founding member Giuseppe would ever see the United States. Band members from that tour have said that it was the most redeeming tour of the states ever for him.

In 2002, Raw Power went back into the studio to record Still Screaming After 20 Years, a celebration of their two decades as a band. Shortly after finishing it, on 6 October, guitarist and founding member Giuseppe Codeluppi suffered a heart attack while playing soccer, and died. The cover of the "Still Screaming" album was the only record cover where the band used a photo, rather than artistic images. It's a photo taken by Patino at Meteor Crater, Arizona, where a meteor had allegedly hit the earth over 50,000 years prior. It was the last photo of Giuseppe with his band ever taken in America.

After his death, the remaining members debated on keeping on. In the end, it was decided that Giuseppe would have wanted the band to continue, with or without him.

European tours followed in 2004–2005. In 2005 Roberto the drummer was replaced by Fabio because of health reasons.

In 2007 Tommi Prodi was back in the band replacing guitarist Luca Carpi.

In 2008 Marco Massarenti was back in the band replacing bassist Alessandro Ronchini.

13 April 2010 Beer City Records released the first 'Raw Power' box set entitled 'The Reagan Years'. This set contains one DVD and two CD's. All the material featured in this set compiles most of the material recorded by the band during the 1980s. Thereforth the title 'The Reagan Years'. Also included is a full DVD sized lyric book with liner notes by Mauro the singer and co-founder of Raw Power. Beer City also brought back Vince 'Rancid' Packard to do the cover art. Packard had done both the covers for 'Screams from the Gutter' and 'After Your Brain'. The cover features the monster (being torn apart by Ronald Reagan complete with a monkey on his shoulder with Oliver North's face) seen on many 'Raw Power' covers along with the familiar sewer setting and rat. The CD's total 63 tracks and the DVD contains two live performances. One from 1986 and one from 1987. Both were filmed on U.S. tours the band had done.

October 2010 P.I.G. records released the band's new album, Resuscitate, 8 years after Still Screaming.... It was recorded in Seattle's Studio Litho (owned by Pearl Jam's Stone Gossard) during the 2009 US tour. It features 24 new song, plus two The Stooges covers ("I Wanna Be Your Dog" and "Raw Power") and a remake of the band's 1988 classic "Mine to Kill" as ghost track.

In 2012, the Italian F.O.A.D. Records started reprinting all of the classic albums of Raw Power, starting with the first demo tape printed for the first time on vinyl, entitled Birth, passing through the first four records, and adding for the first time totally new audio material, including the discovery of a totally unknown demo dating back to 1982. For the same label, the same year, the split 7" with D.R.I. released in 2001 is reprinted, this time in double flexi 7″ colored, with a previously unreleased bonus track. The same year also saw the release of "No More Borders", a 4-way split 7 "together with MDC, Som-Hi Noise and Naked Aggression. The record is co-produced by different European and American labels and contains an unreleased track for each band.

On 7 October 2012 Luca Carpi died at 34 of pulmonary embolism.

Throughout 2013 the band plays continuously in their own country and across Europe, returned to the U.S. in April and recorded a new album with Beer City records, "Tired and Furious", released in mid-2014 .

In 2013 Paolo di Bernardo on guitar Gianmarco Agosti on drums joined the band.

In 2014 and in 2015 Raw Power toured the U.S.

In 2016 the band toured Europe, playing with Agnostic Front and H_{2}O.

In 2017 Indiebox Records released the new album "Inferno" and Raw Power played the biggest Italian punk rock festivals. At the end of the year the band toured Australia for the first time.

In 2018 Mattia "Berta" Bertani replaced Gianmarco Agosti on drums.

In 2019 Raw Power toured Japan for the first time, together with Cripple Bastards.

== Reception ==
Raw Power are considered to be one of the most seminal hardcore punk bands. Contemporary fans include Cripple Bastards and Napalm Death's Barney Greenway.

== Members ==
=== Current ===
- Mauro Codeluppi – vocals (1981–present)
- Marco Massarenti – bass (2004–present)
- Gianmarco Agosti – drums (2013–present)
- Paolo di Bernardo – guitar (2015–present)

=== Former ===
- Giuseppe Codeluppi – guitar (1981–2002; his death)
- Maurizio Dodi – guitar (1981–1984), bass (1985–1988)
- Davide Devoti – guitar (1985, 1989–1990)
- Silvio Stefanini – guitar (1986–1988, 1994–1995, 2000–2001)
- Tommi Prodi – guitar (1991–1994, 2007–2014)
- Luca Carpi – guitar (1996–1997, 2001–2007; died 2012)
- Niccolò Bossini – guitar (1997–1999)
- Silvio Codeluppi – bass (1981–1984)
- Alessandro Paolucci – bass (1989–1999, 2001–2003)
- Alessandro Ronchini – bass (2000–2001)
- Helder Stefanini – drums (1981–1988, 1993–1994)
- Fabiano Bianco – drums (1989–1990)
- Sergio Simonazzi – drums (1991–1992)
- Andrea Cavani – drums (1994–1997)
- Emanuele Castagneti – drums (1997–1999)
- Paolo Casali – drums (2000–2001)
- Roberto Colla – drums (2001–2003)
- Fabio Ferrari – drums (2004–2012)

== Discography ==
=== Studio albums ===
- Raw Power (demo, self-released, 1983)
- You Are the Victim (Meccano 1983)
- Screams from the Gutter (Toxic Shock 1985)
- Wop Hour (EP) (Toxic Shock 1985)
- After Your Brain (Toxic Shock 1986)
- Mine to Kill (Sonik Attack 1989)
- Too Tough to Burn (Contempo 1993)
- Fight (Godhead 1995)
- Reptile House (Mad Mob 1998)
- Raw Power / D.R.I. split EP (Killer Release 2001)
- Trust Me (Hello 2001)
- Still Screaming, After 20 Years (Six Weeks 2003)
- Resuscitate (P.I.G. 2010)
- Raw Power / MDC / Naked Aggression / Som-Hinoise split EP (D.I.Y. Labels 2012)
- Tired & Furious (Beer city records 2014)
- Inferno (Indiebox / Demons Run Amok Ent. 2017)

=== Live albums ===
- Live in the U.S.A. (B.C.T. 1985)
- Live Danger (T.V.O.R. 1991)
- Live from the Gutter (Godhead 1996)
- Live CBGB's NYC 1998 (Time To Kill Records 2026)

=== Box sets / compilations ===
- Screams from the Gutter / After Your Brain ( Westworld 1994)
- Burning the Factory (Grand Theft Audio 1996)
- The Hit List (Sudden Death 2004)
- Fuck Authority (S.O.A. 2005)
- The Reagan Years (Beer City 2010)
- Birth (F.O.A.D. 2012)
- You Are the Victim / God's Course (F.O.A.D. 2013)

=== Various artists ===
- Raptus – LP (Meccano 1983)
- Music on fire – TAPE (B.C.T. 1983)
- Alcoholic for the Evil One (Tape) (Unknown 1983)
- Raptus 2: Negazione e Superamento (Meccano 1984)
- Maximum Rock'n'Roll: Welcome to 1984 (M.R.R. 1984)
- 4xA = A x Tutti – 7" (Totò alle Prese coi Dischi 1984)
- I'm Buck Naked! (Tape) (B.C.T. 1984)
- Last white Christmas (Tape) (B.C.T. 1984)
- I Thrash, Therefor I Am (Tape) (B.C.T. 1985)
- The Raw Power of Life Vol.2 (Tape) (Unknown 1985)
- We Can Do Whatever We Want (B.C.T. 1986)
- World War III? (Rot 1986)
- Eastern Front III: Live at Ruthie's Inn (Restless 1986)
- I've Got an Attitude Problem (B.C.T./Loony Toons 1987)
- Rat Music For Rat People Vol.3 (CD Presents Ltd. 1987)
- Decade of Disaster (Toxic Shock 1994)
- All For One…One For All (Grand Theft Audio 1995)
- Punk Territory Vol.7 (Anthology/F.O.G. 1996)
- Network of Friends Vol.2 (Plastic Bomb/Ataque Sonoro 1998)
- Street Punkers (Mania 1998)
- Rock Sound Sampler Vol.14 – CD (Rock Sound Mag. 1999)
- Bite the Bullet(Know 1999)
- Anarchy For Money (Detroit Noise 1999)
- Last White Christmas (Schizophrenic 2000)
- I Thrash, Therefor I Am (Schizophrenic/B.C.T./Human Stench 2000)
- Against Your System (Versus 2001)
- The Dirty Rotten Power (2001)
- Uncage Your Punk Side (Dave 2001)
- Time to Move (No Brain 2001)
- Rock Sound: Punk Rock Vol.14 (Rock Sound Mag. 2002)
- Punkadeka Compilation(Punkadeka 2002)
- Hate Love (Lovehate80/S.O.A./Mele Marce 2005)
- Hate Love (Lovehate80/Valium/Agipunk 2006)
- Coverones (Tornado Ride 2007)
- S-hits! (Tornado Ride/Senza Culo 2008)
- Mass Prod. Anniversary (Mass Prod. 2008)
- Shut the Fuck Up and Listen Vol.3 (P.I.G. 2011)
- The Zombie Pit (P.I.G./Manic Pogo 2011)
- Born Sick/Raw Power "Sick with Power" (Die Laughing Records)
