= Thrash Zone =

Studio album by D.R.I.
- Released: October 10, 1989
- Recorded: August–September 1989
- Studio: Cornerstone (Chatsworth, California); Preferred Sound (Woodland Hills, California); Track Recorded (North Hollywood, California)
- Genre: Crossover thrash, Thrash metal
- Length: 48:29
- Label: Metal Blade
- Producer: Spike Cassidy and Bill Metoyer

D.R.I. chronology
4 of a Kind (1988)	Thrash Zone (1989)	Definition (1992)

Professional ratings
Review scores
Source	Rating
AllMusic	3.0/5 stars

Thrash Zone is the fifth album by the American crossover thrash band D.R.I., released in 1989. It continues the thrash metal style of the previous album, 4 of a Kind. Thrash Zone was D.R.I.'s most successful album to date, and produced the song "Beneath the Wheel", which was made as a music video and received airplay on MTV. The song also was featured in the video game Skate 2. The album also contained the song "Abduction" which would also have a video made for it.

== Track listing ==
No.	Title	Length
1.	"Thrashard"	3:40
2.	"Beneath the Wheel"	5:36
3.	"Enemy Within"	2:44
4.	"Strategy"	4:19
5.	"Labeled Uncurable"	3:04
6.	"You Say I'm Scum"	1:55
7.	"Gun Control"	4:59
8.	"Kill the Words"	4:43
9.	"Drown You Out"	2:31
10.	"The Trade"	4:28
11.	"Standing in Line"	1:35
12.	"Give a Hoot"	3:55
13.	"Worker Bee"	0:56
14.	"Abduction"	4:04

- "Labeled Uncurable" and "You Say I'm Scum" are bonus tracks:
- "Labeled Uncurable" appears on the CD and as an LP bonus track.
- "You Say I'm Scum" appears as a CD-only bonus track.

== Credits ==
- Kurt Brecht – vocals
- Spike Cassidy – guitars
- John Menor – bass
- Felix Griffin – drums
