= Thrashcore =

Fast-tempo subgenre of hardcore punk

- Other names: Fastcore
- Stylistic origins: Hardcore punk; punk rock
- Cultural origins: Early 1980s, United States
- Derivative forms: Crustcore; grindcore; powerviolence

Subgenres
- Bandana thrash

Other topics
- Crust punk; D-beat; skate punk; crossover thrash; List of thrashcore bands; thrash metal

Thrashcore (also known as fastcore) is a fast-tempo subgenre of hardcore punk that emerged in the early 1980s. Thrashcore is essentially sped-up hardcore, adopting a slightly more extreme style by means of its vocals, dissonance, and occasional use of blast beats. Songs are usually very brief, and thrashcore is in many ways a less dissonant, minimally metallic forerunner of grindcore. The genre is sometimes associated with the skateboarder subculture.

== Terminological ambiguity ==
Thrashcore is often confused with crossover thrash and sometimes thrash metal. Further confusion is added by the fact that many crossover bands, such as D.R.I., began as influential thrashcore bands. Throughout the '80s, the term "thrash" was in use as a synonym for hardcore punk (as in the New York Thrash compilation of 1982). It eventually came to be used for the faster, more intense style of hardcore punk. The term thrashcore is of recent vintage but dates from at least 1993. The "-core" suffix is necessary to distinguish it from the thrash metal scene, which is also referred to as "thrash" by fans. Still more confusingly, the term "thrashcore" is occasionally used by the music press to refer to thrash metal-inflected metalcore.

== History ==
=== Origins ===
Just as hardcore punk groups distinguished themselves from their punk rock predecessors by their greater intensity and aggression, thrashcore groups (often identified simply as "thrash") sought to play at breakneck tempos that would radicalize the innovations of hardcore. Early American thrashcore groups included Cryptic Slaughter (Santa Monica), D.R.I. (Houston), HYPE (Toronto, Canada), Septic Death (Boise, Idaho) and Siege (Weymouth, Massachusetts). The British Electro Hippies, the Dutch Lärm, the Italian Raw Power, and the Japanese S.O.B. also practiced important examples of the style. Some of Negative Approach's later work was influential on the scene.

=== Powerviolence ===
The powerviolence scene grew out of thrashcore as an American counterpart to the British grindcore scene, which had emerged from crust punk, with bands such as Septic Death, Infest and Siege being the first to move towards the style. Powerviolence groups saw themselves as distinct from grindcore because of the increasing proximity of grindcore groups to the death metal being performed in Florida, Sweden, and Brazil. Powerviolence groups wished to avoid the association with heavy metal music and culture that crossover thrash, thrash metal, and grindcore had made, while also incorporating "tempo changes with droney and sludgey down tempo parts". As well as from thrashcore, powerviolence groups also took inspiration from crust punk, and eventually from noise music. Main groups associated with powerviolence included No Comment, Hellnation, Man Is The Bastard, Crossed Out, Charles Bronson, Spazz and Rorschach.

=== Grindcore ===
Thrashcore groups such as S.O.B., Cryptic Slaughter, Siege and Deep Wound were major influences on early grindcore acts such as Napalm Death, Carcass and Repulsion. Grindcore is considered to be more metallic, due to its influence from crust punk.

=== Revival ===
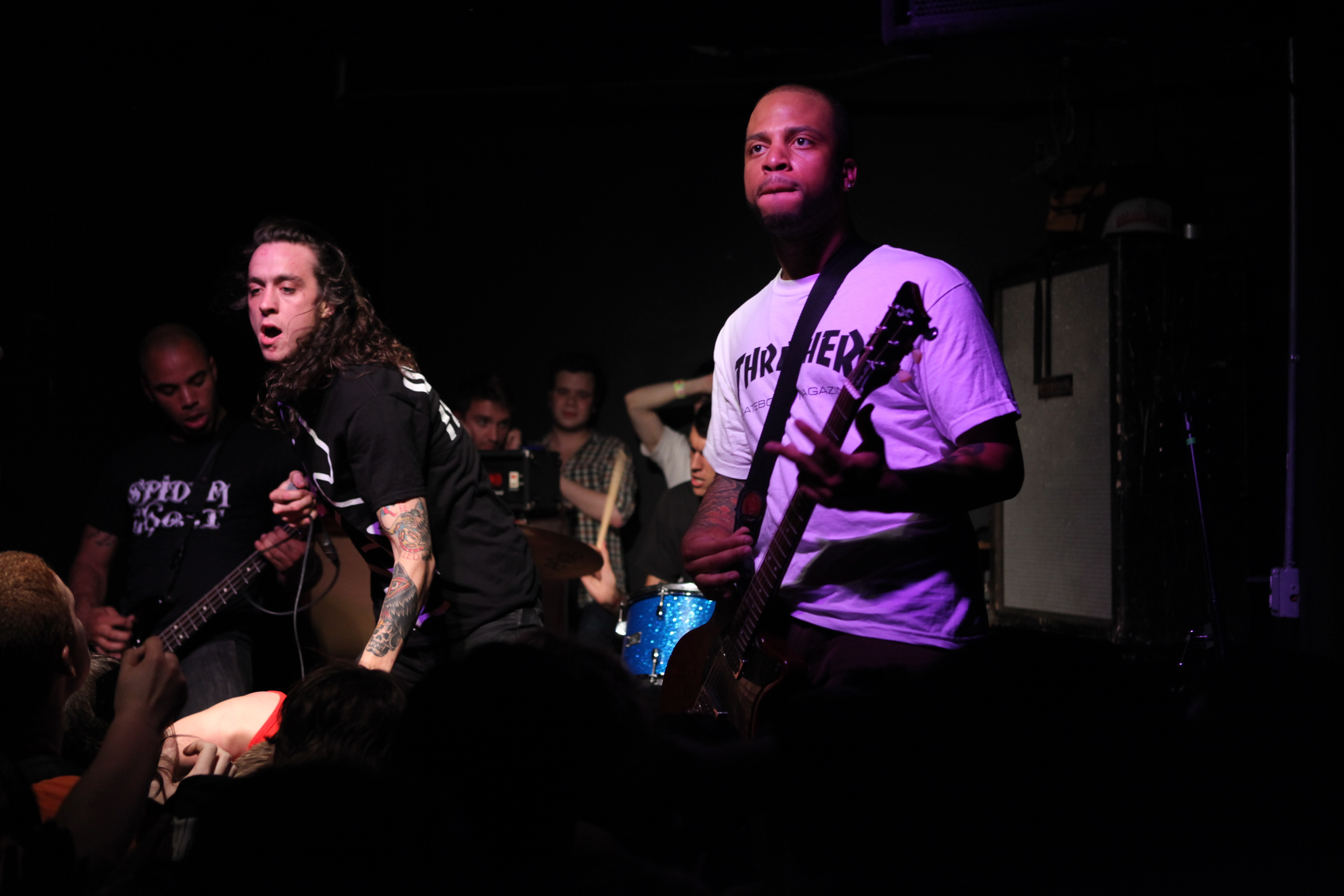
Contemporary thrashcore band Trash Talk performing in 2010

The '90s saw a revival of the thrashcore style, as groups that had previously been associated with powerviolence or grindcore began to explore their debt to this earlier form of extreme music such as rock and metal. This was sometimes referred to as bandana thrash, in reference to the headgear preferred by many of the performers. Prominent '90s thrashcore groups included Code 13, MK-ULTRA, Guyana Punch Line, What Happens Next? and R.A.M.B.O. (from the United States), Vitamin X (from the Netherlands), Vivisick (from Japan) and Voorhees (from the UK). These groups sometimes felt a greater association with other elements of '80s hardcore punk, such as straight edge, anarcho-punk, youth crew, or crust punk, than most initial thrashcore groups did.

== Record labels ==
- 625 Thrashcore
- Havoc Records
- Ebullition Records
- Slap-a-Ham Records
- Deep Six Records
- Six Weeks
- Sound Pollution Records

== Bibliography ==
- Blush, Steven (2001). American Hardcore: A Tribal History. Feral House. ISBN 0-922915-71-7
