= Kurt Brecht =

American singer

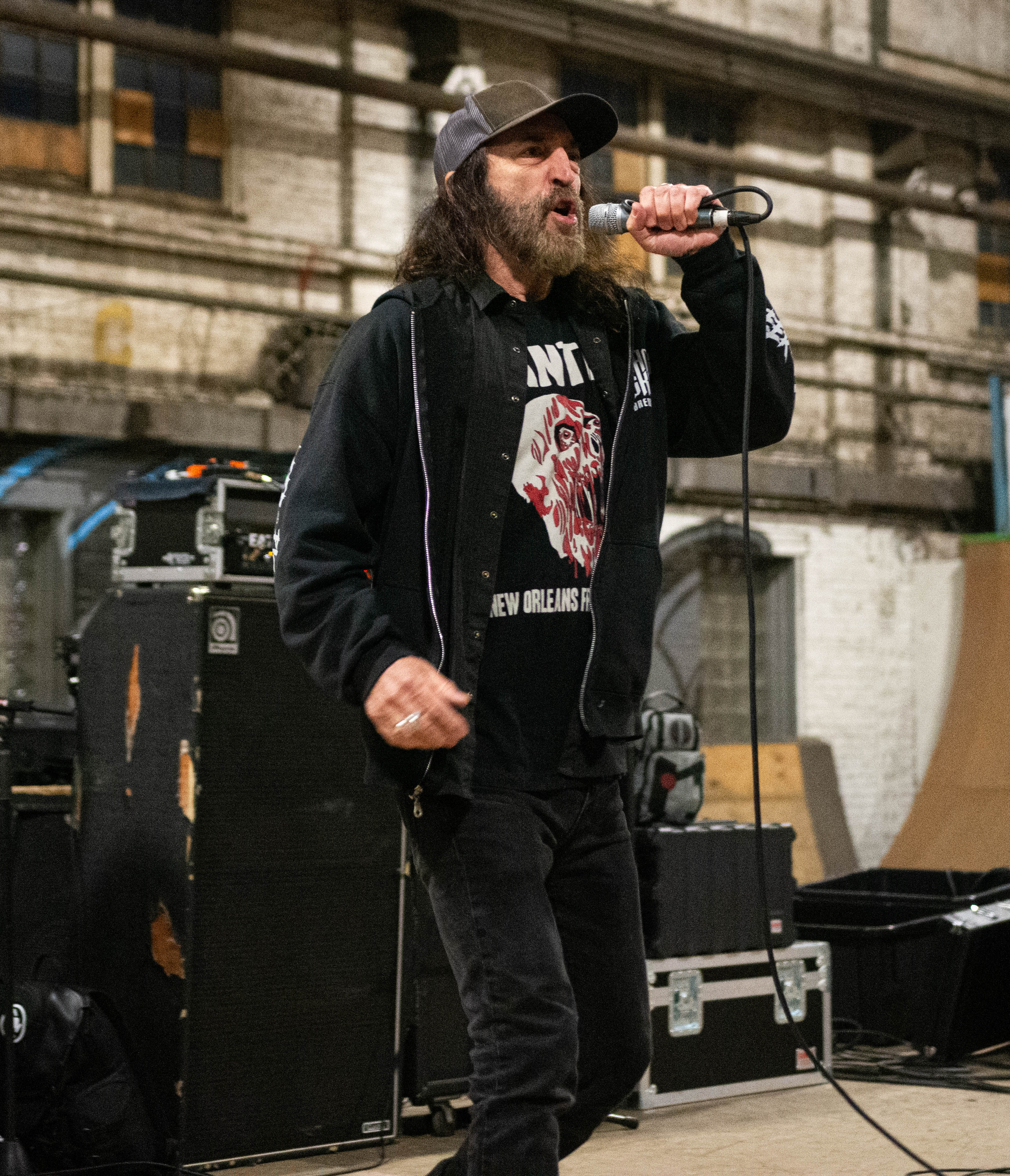
- Brecht performing with D.R.I. in 2025

Background information
- Birth name: Kurt Preston Brecht
- Born: August 24, 1961 (age 63); Houston, Texas, U.S.
- Genres: Crossover thrash, thrash metal, hardcore punk
- Occupation(s): Singer, songwriter, author
- Years active: 1980–present
- Member of: D.R.I., Pasadena Napalm Division

Kurt Preston Brecht (born August 24, 1961) is an American vocalist best known for his work as the singer of crossover thrash band D.R.I. (Dirty Rotten Imbeciles). He is also in a thrash band called Pasadena Napalm Division (P.N.D.).

== Career ==
=== D.R.I. ===
Born in Houston, Texas, Brecht formed D.R.I. in 1982 when he was 21 years old, along with his brother Eric on drums, Spike Cassidy on guitars and Dennis Johnson on bass. After releasing their first album in 1983, D.R.I. experienced its first lineup change, with Eric and Johnson leaving the band in 1984. Since then, D.R.I. would go through many lineup changes, although Brecht has remained constant as the lead vocalist alongside guitarist Cassidy, who also has been a permanent member. With the release of the highly regarded but commercially unsuccessful 1985 album Dealing with It!, D.R.I. abandoned the hardcore punk style of their first album for a crossover thrash style, which would continue on their next four albums, Crossover (1987), 4 of a Kind (1988), their breakthrough Thrash Zone (1989), and Definition (1992). After weak sales of their last studio album date, Full Speed Ahead (1995), D.R.I. had decided they would no longer record any new music. Since then, the band has continued touring almost constantly for years, and until 2016's But Wait... There's More!, they had not released any new material.

=== Other ===
Other than working with D.R.I., Brecht did guest vocals on "Silent Spring" by Dave Grohl's side project dubbed Probot.

Brecht has published four books: Notes from the Nest, The 30-Day Diarrhea Diet Plan, See The Loud Feeling, and Whore Stories.
