= Dirty Rotten Imbeciles =

American crossover thrash band

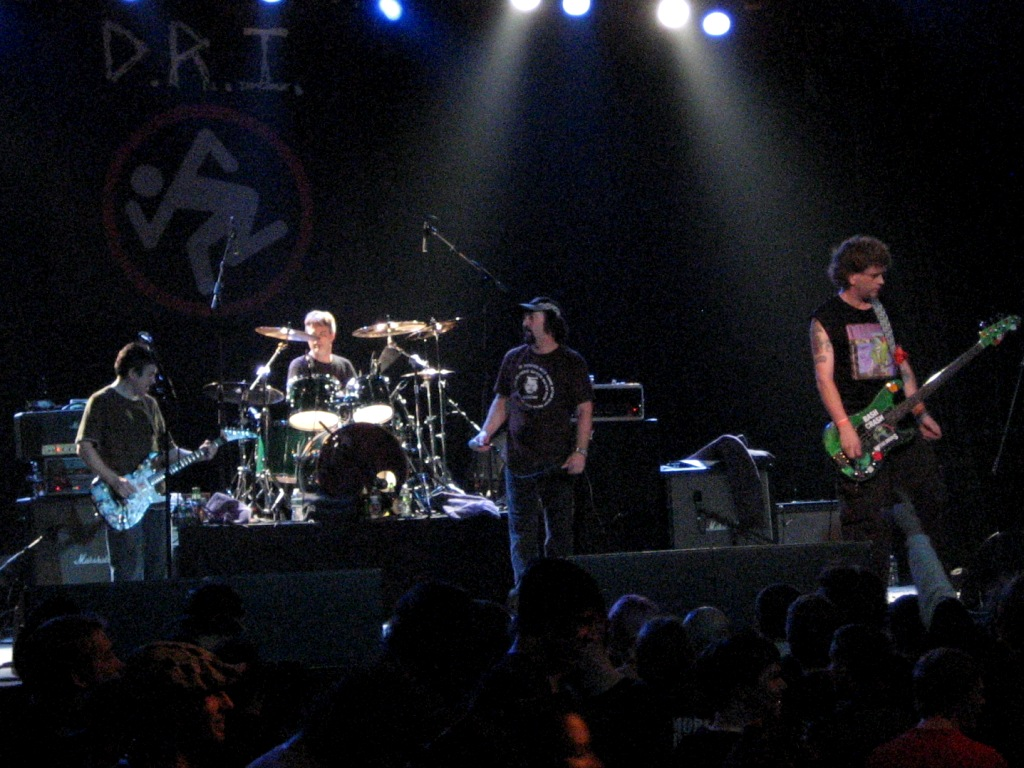
- Dirty Rotten Imbeciles in 2010

Background information
- Also known as: D.R.I.; US D.R.I.
- Origin: Houston, Texas, U.S.
- Genres: Crossover thrash; hardcore punk
- Works: Discography
- Years active: 1982–present
- Labels: Dirty Rotten; Metal Blade; Beer City; Fringe Product
- Members: Kurt Brecht; Spike Cassidy; Greg Orr; Danny Walker
- Past members: See below
- Website: dirtyrottenimbeciles.com

Dirty Rotten Imbeciles (often abbreviated and referred to as D.R.I.) are an American crossover thrash band that formed in Houston, Texas in 1982 and would later relocate to San Francisco, California. The band is currently composed of two of its founding members, lead vocalist Kurt Brecht and guitarist Spike Cassidy, as well as bassist Greg Orr and drummer Danny Walker.

D.R.I. never gained a mainstream audience, but the integration of their hardcore punk roots with thrash metal influences was a stylistic catalyst for their contemporaries – most notably Suicidal Tendencies, Corrosion of Conformity, Stormtroopers of Death, the Cro-Mags, Nuclear Assault, Adrenalin O.D., and Cryptic Slaughter – alongside whom they are considered to be one of the major pioneers of what would later be called "crossover thrash". These bands had a heavy influence on modern thrash metal.

As of 2026, D.R.I. has released seven full-length studio albums. Apart from three new songs on the 2016 EP But Wait... There's More!, they have not released a full-length studio album since Full Speed Ahead in 1995. Despite this, the band has continued to tour for almost every year, and gone on hiatus intermittently, notably between 2004 and 2009, when Cassidy was diagnosed with colon cancer. Since the late 1990s, D.R.I. has been working on their eighth full-length studio album, which remains unreleased.

== History ==
=== Early days (1982–1986) ===
Dirty Rotten Imbeciles (then-called US D.R.I.) was formed in Houston in May 1982 by former members of the hardcore punk band Suburbanites. The original line-up consisted of Spike Cassidy on guitar, Kurt Brecht on lead vocals, Eric Brecht on drums and Dennis Johnson on bass, which was basically the Suburbanites with Cassidy on guitar. Cassidy's roommate played guitar in the Suburbanites.

The group started practicing at Kurt and Eric's parents' home. The noise made by the band allegedly drew regular complaints from Kurt and Eric's father. This led to the band gaining their name when they were described as a "bunch of dirty rotten imbeciles." This was also an inspiration for the song "Madman," which featured a clip of Kurt and Eric's father interrupting a band practice to complain about the noise. They initially went under the name US D.R.I for a brief period before shortening it to D.R.I. Presumably, the "US" stood for the band, as mentioned in interviews off of the extended version of the Dirty Rotten CD. Photos of the band can be found with the original US D.R.I logo. The "Skanker Man" logo was designed by original drummer Eric Brecht as part of an assignment entitled 'signage', when both he and Kurt were attending the same design course at art college.

Two months later, on July 2, 1982, the band played their first show at Joe Star's OMNI, in Houston.

On November 6 and 7, 1982, D.R.I. recorded their first release, the Dirty Rotten EP, fitting 22 songs into 18 minutes on a 7-inch EP. Not long before its release, US D.R.I. had changed their name to just D.R.I., and only 1000 copies of the EP version were pressed, making it now a collector's item. Demand caused this EP to be pressed into a 12-inch LP version, also released in 1983, aptly titled Dirty Rotten LP.

In 1983, D.R.I. relocated to from Texas to San Francisco, where they lived in their van and ate at soup kitchens between gigs. Dennis Johnson quit the band and returned home to Texas. He was replaced with Sebastion Amok, and within a few months D.R.I. embarked on their first tour, appearing on the "Rock Against Reagan" tour with MDC and the Dead Kennedys. After the tour, Josh Pappe was brought in to replace Sebastian Amok who would eventually join The Dicks, another Texas band.

Their next release was the four-song 7-inch EP Violent Pacification in 1984. After touring in the summer of 1984, Eric Brecht got married and left the band. He was replaced with a 17-year-old Felix Griffin. Also in 1984, one of their songs, "Snap" appeared on the anti-war benefit compilation P.E.A.C.E. along with other famous hardcore and punk bands such as Crass, D.O.A., Dead Kennedys and MDC.

D.R.I.'s second full-length album, Dealing with It!, was released in March 1985 on Metal Blade Records. The group toured extensively in support of the album. During the recording of the album, Josh Pappe took a leave from the band. Mikey Offender (Mikey Donaldson – bass player of The Offenders) was asked to play for the album, although Spike played bass on the songs that Donaldson did not have time to learn. The songs on Dealing with It! leaned slightly towards a metal direction, but still kept the band's thrashcore sound. As a result, D.R.I. toured relentlessly throughout 1985 and 1986 in support of Dealing with It!, and it was on this tour that the band gained a wide audience by performing with thrash metal bands such as Slayer, Anthrax, Exodus, Overkill and Hirax, while continuing to perform with their hardcore punk peers, including Discharge, Corrosion of Conformity, Bad Brains, T.S.O.L., JFA, Descendents, Verbal Abuse, Gang Green and Cryptic Slaughter. Also on this tour, they recorded their show at the Olympic Auditorium in Los Angeles on April 26, 1986, and released it on video, which was entitled Live at the Olympic.

=== Crossover thrash period (1987–1996) ===
When Felix joined D.R.I. in 1984, he brought a new audience to the shows. The next three years the band toured and started developing a new genre, (along with other pioneers) crossover. Their third album, Crossover, released in 1987, was aptly named, as the songs on this album had a strong metal sound to them. As the band began to cross over to thrash, their songs became longer, slower, and more complex. The press has called D.R.I. the major band of the "crossover" movement, a style that combined hardcore punk and thrash metal. This music invited a mixed audience of punks, skinheads, and metal fans to their shows. Thanks to this movement, Crossover helped expand D.R.I.'s popularity worldwide, including touring Europe and Australia for the first time, and opening for a variety of bands such as The Exploited and Anthrax.

The Live At The Ritz video was recorded next, on June 27, 1987, at The Ritz in New York, during the band's worldwide Crossover tour.

In February 1988, the Dirty Rotten Imbeciles returned to the studio to record 4 of a Kind. The songs on this album continued in the band's metal style. They released a music video for the song "Suit and Tie Guy", and the Dirty Rotten LP was remixed to include the songs from the Violent Pacification EP, and was re-released. The band toured worldwide again to support the 4 of a Kind album, first in North America with Kreator and Holy Terror, and Europe with The Exploited and Gang Green. Just before they started working on their next album, Josh Pappe left D.R.I. because of an offer to play for Gang Green. He was replaced by John Menor.

In October 1989, D.R.I. released their fifth album Thrash Zone. Continuing in the same vein as 4 of a Kind, the album was another success for D.R.I. and two music videos were released to accompany it, "Beneath the Wheel" and "Abduction". The band toured for almost two years in support of Thrash Zone, mainly in Europe and North America, performing with numerous bands such as Nasty Savage, Sick of It All, Corrosion of Conformity, Mordred, Excel, Uncle Slam, Cryptic Slaughter, Dead Horse, Atrophy and Bitter End.

In 1990, Felix Griffin left the group and was replaced by Rob Rampy. Around the same time, D.R.I. had severed ties with Metal Blade Records and it took over two years and a search for a new label, until the band's own imprint Rotten Records released the band's sixth album Definition in October 1992. A music video was released for the song, "Acid Rain". The video would later be featured in an episode of MTV's Beavis and Butt-Head.

D.R.I. toured throughout 1992 and 1993 in support of Definition, including opening for Testament, as well as headlining their own shows. During this tour, they recorded their gig at the Hollywood Palladium on November 27, 1992, and it was released in 1994 as their first live album, appropriately entitled Live. It was, more or less, "released as a stepping stone between Definition and Full Speed Ahead". Soon after recording the show, John Menor left D.R.I. and was replaced by the band's long time friend and roadie, Chumly Porter.

The group took part in headlining the Lolitabazooka Tour in the fall of 1994. However, the band was less active during this period and focused on extracurricular activities.

In November 1995, D.R.I. released Full Speed Ahead. They also made another music video, this time for a song called "Syringes In The Sandbox".

In January 1996, they started touring North America with Acid Bath opening for them. But in April, two band members ran into trouble trying to enter Canada, because they had both been previously charged with driving under the influence in the U.S. This resulted in the cancellation of all their Canadian tour dates.

=== Touring (1997–2005) ===
During 1997 and 1998, D.R.I. continued to tour the world extensively, including European and South American dates. Also in 1998, D.R.I. announced that they were writing songs for the follow-up to Full Speed Ahead, including "Against Me", "As Seen on TV", "Bad News", "Brick Wall View", "Destructive Power", "Insanity Plea", "Saddam Insane", "Sweaty Deli Tray" and "Wrong as Usual"; the former of the two would be released 18 years later on But Wait... There's More!. Steady touring, as well as the band's slow writing and recording pace and the search for a record label, resulted in putting the album on hold for over half a decade; eventually they were signed to Beer City Records. By the spring of 2004, D.R.I. had demoed at least four new songs for a potential eighth studio album, including "Against Me", which was available downloading at the "record news" page from their official web site for several years.

During 1999, D.R.I. appeared as one of the headlining bands on the "Social Chaos" in North America Tour. One of their songs, "I'm The Liar", is used for a Social Chaos Tour CD compilation. During August 1999, in the middle of the tour, Chumly left the band after tiring of touring. He was replaced by Harald Oimoen. Oimoen had been working on and off with the band for years, doing everything from photography and merchandise to bass tech. The band resumed the tour missing only two shows.

The turn of the millennium saw the Dirty Rotten Imbeciles headline the "Millennium 2000 Tour". The constant cycle of touring continued into 2001 with D.R.I. extensively touring the United States on the "Old School Tour" culminating in a headlining appearance at the Milwaukee Metal Fest, and other tours of the United States, Japan, Europe and South America into 2003. In 2003, Beer City reissued "Dirty Rotten CD," which featured the original full length Dirty Rotten LP and the Violent Pacification 7-inch EP as well as a number of never-before-released bonus tracks and interviews. Included within the bonus tracks were live recordings of D.R.I.'s first show ever and footage from the band's only performance at New York's famous CBGB's from the 1984 Violent Pacification tour. In 2003, Beer City also reissued Dealing with It!; the CD contained the original album plus never-before-heard bonus tracks as well as live video footage including a mid-80s interview from a San Francisco Public-access television cable TV show.

After another tour in 2004, the band released Live At CBGB's CD and DVD, and the reissue of the Crossover album, all on Beer City. The reissue of Crossover was delayed due to Cassidy's illness.

=== Hiatus, recovery of Cassidy, and continued touring (2006–2010) ===
In March 2006, Cassidy was diagnosed with colon cancer, which put the band's performances and recording on hiatus until his recovery. In December 2006, Cassidy had completed all radiation and chemotherapy; a one-foot section of the large intestine (colon) was removed through an eight-inch incision in his stomach. An announcement on the band's website declared Cassidy cancer free as of August 2008.

Cassidy commented on his return to the stage: "I am very happy D.R.I. will be playing again, it has been far too long. We are currently setting up weekends to test the water and rebuild the stamina that we were known for. We all look forward to restarting up exactly where we left off."

On April 13, 2010, Beer City Records reissued "Crossover – Millennium Edition" on LP and CD. Finally after many years Crossover was once again available. This reissue was remastered by the original co-producer/engineer Bill Metoyer. The CD version contains eleven bonus tracks including five songs from their performance at NYC's The Ritz. That same year, the label reissued The Dirty Rotten EP, The Dirty Rotten LP, Violent Pacification 7-inch and Dealing with It! on vinyl.

=== But Wait... There's More!, lineup changes and possible new album (2011–present) ===
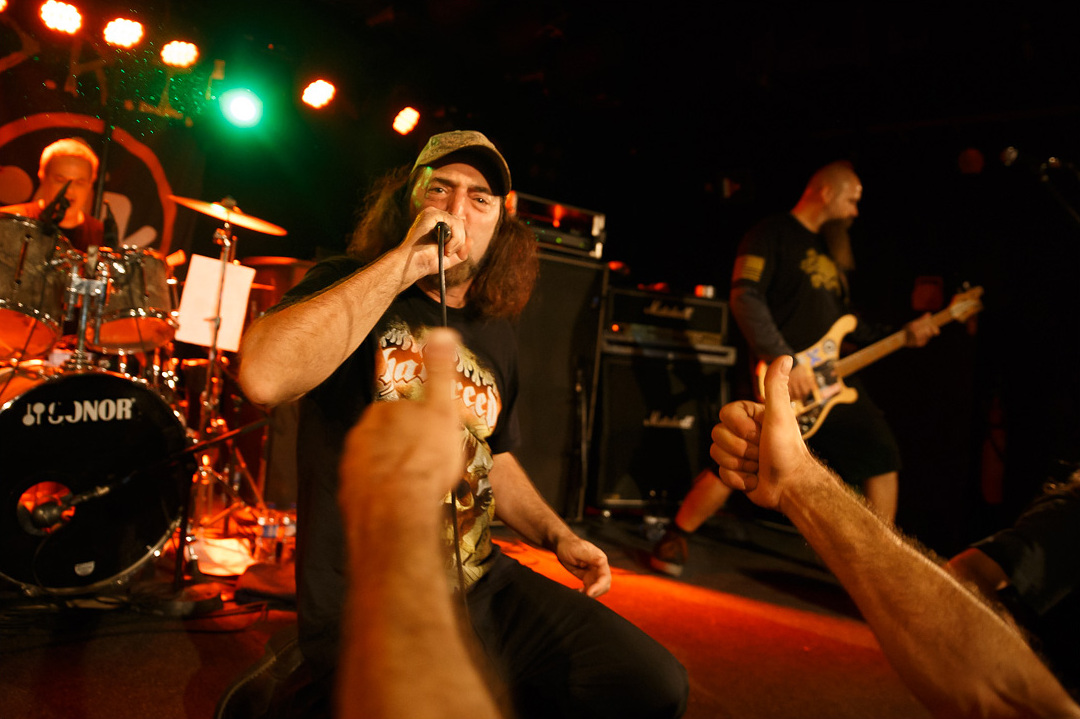
D.R.I. in 2018

From 2011 through 2019, the band regularly trekked the United States, as well as tours of the United Kingdom, Europe, and South America. The COVID-19 pandemic canceled or postponed dates in 2020 but the band returned to the road in 2021 and planned for a 40th-anniversary tour in 2022 across the United States, Canada, Europe, Australia, and Central America.

D.R.I. entered a Southern California studio in October 2014 to begin recording an EP containing new material. It was produced by Bill Metoyer, who produced the band's later studio albums. The EP, titled But Wait... There's More!, was released on June 10, 2016. Vocalist Kurt Brecht has described the EP as "more punk rock than metal".

Although no longer working with D.R.I., one of the band's old record labels, Rotten Records, in 2015, filed in the United States District Court for the District of Massachusetts in a suit against a Comcast user who allegedly downloaded and shared the band's sixth album. According to the lawsuit, Rotten Records hired Rightscorp to monitor BitTorrent networks for infringement. The company claims it connected to the defendants' BitTorrent clients and downloaded a full copy of the album, later verifying that they were identical to the original copyright works.

On September 17, 2014, it was announced that Rob Rampy had departed from the band, citing serious injury as the reason. He was then replaced by Brandon Karns, who subsequently left the band shortly thereafter. Karns was then replaced by Walter "Monsta" Ryan. However, Rampy rejoined D.R.I in 2018. In 2017, the band parted ways with their longtime bassist Harald Oimoen, who was replaced by Greg Orr (ex-Attitude Adjustment).

In 2024, long time drummer Rampy left the band and was replaced by Danny Walker.

In January 2019, Metal Addicts reported that D.R.I. had been working on their first full-length studio album since 1995's Full Speed Ahead, though no new material has been released as of 2026. In 2025, the band participated in the Hell's Heroes music festival held at the White Oak Music Hall in Houston.

== Musical style and legacy ==
D.R.I.'s music has combined elements of punk rock, thrash metal, speed metal, and heavy metal, while their early material has been described as hardcore punk. They are often cited as one of the key bands that helped create the crossover thrash genre, along with S.O.D., Suicidal Tendencies and Corrosion of Conformity. Allmusic.com has claimed that, "Starting off as a speedy, straight-ahead punk band, they gradually mixed more elements of heavy metal into their sound; as they did so, their songs got longer and featured more sections and more variety in tempo. D.R.I. managed the then-rare feat of crossing over to metal audiences while retaining their skate-punk and hardcore fan bases – they had something for all those audiences to love (or hate)." According to Dan Epstein of Guitar World, D.R.I.'s "eighties albums showed a whole generation of hardcore kids that metal and punk were not mutually exclusive", and he went on to say that, "they're probably best remembered these days for their logo, a doofy stick figure of a dude caught in midskank."

Many bands and artists have cited D.R.I. as an influence or inspiration, including Anthrax, Cryptic Slaughter, Dark Angel, Death Angel, Kreator, Municipal Waste, Nuclear Assault, Slayer and Vio-Lence.

== Members ==
Current

- Kurt Brecht – lead vocals (1982–present)
- Spike Cassidy – guitars, backing vocals (1982–present)
- Greg Orr – bass, backing vocals (2017–present)
- Danny Walker – drums (2024–present)

Former

- Dennis Johnson – bass (1982–1983)
- Sebastion Amok – bass (1983)
- Josh Pappe – bass (1983–1984; 1985–1989, died 2020)
- Mikey "Offender" Donaldson – bass (1984–1985; died 2007)
- John Menor – bass (1989–1994)
- Rob Rampy – drums (1990–2014, 2018–2024)
- Chumly Porter – bass (1994–1999; died 2011)
- Eric Brecht – drums, backing vocals (1982–1984)
- Felix Griffin – drums (1984–1990)
- Harald Oimoen – bass (1999–2017)
- Brandon Karns – drums (2014–2016)
- Walter "Monsta" Ryan – drums (2016–2018)

Timeline

== Discography ==
- Dirty Rotten EP/LP (1983)
- Dealing with It! (1985)
- Crossover (1987)
- 4 of a Kind (1988)
- Thrash Zone (1989)
- Definition (1992)
- Full Speed Ahead (1995)
