= Crossover thrash =

Fusion genre combining thrash metal and hardcore punk

- Stylistic origins: Hardcore punk; thrash metal
- Cultural origins: Mid-1980s, United States (Greater Los Angeles, New York City, Houston, Raleigh).
- Typical instruments: Vocals; electric guitar; bass guitar; drums
- Derivative forms: Metalcore

Regional scenes
- Southern California

Local scenes
- New York

Other topics
- Crossover music; crust punk; grindcore; skate punk; thrashcore; tough guy hardcore; extreme metal

Crossover thrash (often abbreviated to crossover) is a fusion genre of thrash metal and hardcore punk. The genre emerged in the mid-1980s, when hardcore punk bands, such as Suicidal Tendencies, Cryptic Slaughter, Corrosion of Conformity and Dirty Rotten Imbeciles, began to incorporate the influence of thrash metal. At this time, the genre was particularly prominent in the New York hardcore scene, where groups including Agnostic Front, Leeway, Cro-Mags and Stormtroopers of Death were widely influential.

The genre largely declined in popularity by the 1990s; however, its influence developed the prominent metalcore genre. Since the 2000s, crossover thrash has experienced a number of underground revivals, which have produced notable acts including Municipal Waste, Trash Talk, Power Trip, and Drain.

== Etymology ==
The term "thrash" originated as a way of referring to hardcore punk, seen on the 1982 hardcore compilation New York Thrash. Journalist Malcolm Dome coined the term "thrash metal" in 1984, in reference to Anthrax's song "Metal Thrashing Mad". The name "crossover" was coined in reference to Dirty Rotten Imbeciles's 1987 album Crossover.

== History ==
=== Precursors ===
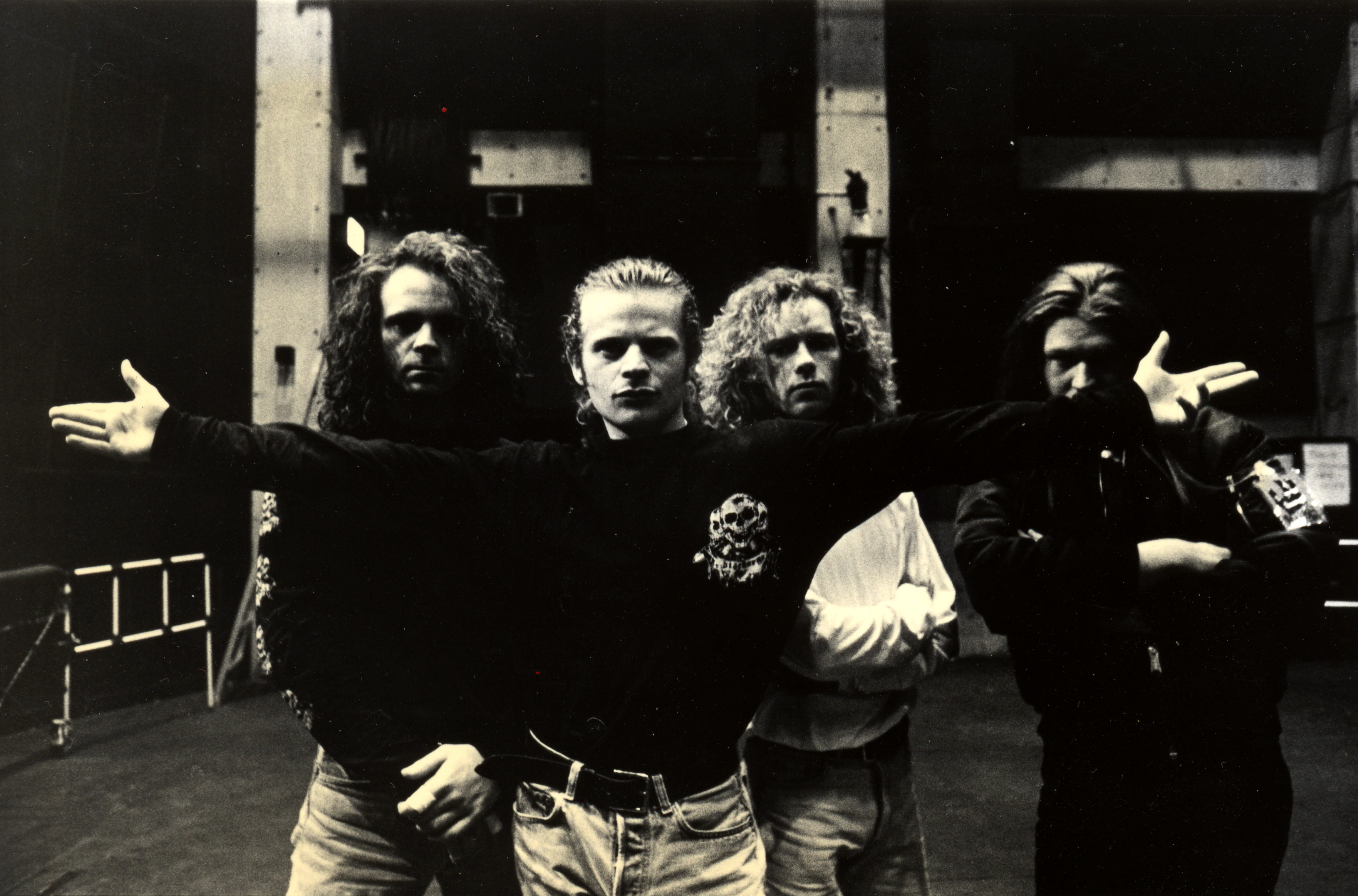
Discharge, an early band to merge punk rock and heavy metal, influencing many pioneering thrash metal groups

Hybrid forms of metal and punk had existed as early as the mid-1970s, with the most notable act being Motörhead. However, Discharge were the first band to turn the fusion into "something a little more long-term". With their 1980 EPs Reality of War, Fight Back and Decontrol, the band began to merge the nascent sounds of hardcore punk and street punk with elements of heavy metal. The band's influence was immediate and widespread, helping influence the beginnings of grindcore, crust punk, black metal and D-beat, and notably pioneering thrash metal groups Metallica, Slayer, Anthrax and Sepultura. In his book Choosing Death author Albert Mudrian called Discharge "the ultimate crossover act, marrying the passion and intensity of punk with the speed and extremity of heavy metal." The initial contact between punk rock and heavy metal involved a "fair amount of mutual loathing. Despite their shared devotion to speed, spite, shredded attire and stomping on distortion pedals, their relationship seemed, at first, unlikely."

Void has been credited as one of the earliest examples of hardcore/heavy metal crossover, whose chaotic musical approach is often cited as particularly influential. Their 1982 split LP with fellow Washington band the Faith showed both bands exhibiting quick, fiery, high-speed punk rock. It has been argued that those recordings laid the foundation for early thrash metal, at least in terms of selected tempos, By 1985, pioneering Boston hardcore bands including SS Decontrol, DYS and the F.U.'s had begun to play heavy metal. Author Steven Blush said of the fusion: "It was natural. The most intense music, after Black Flag and Dead Kennedys, was Slayer and Metallica. Therefore, that's where everybody was going. That turned into a culture war, basically."

=== Mid–1980s to early 1990s: origins and mainstream popularity ===
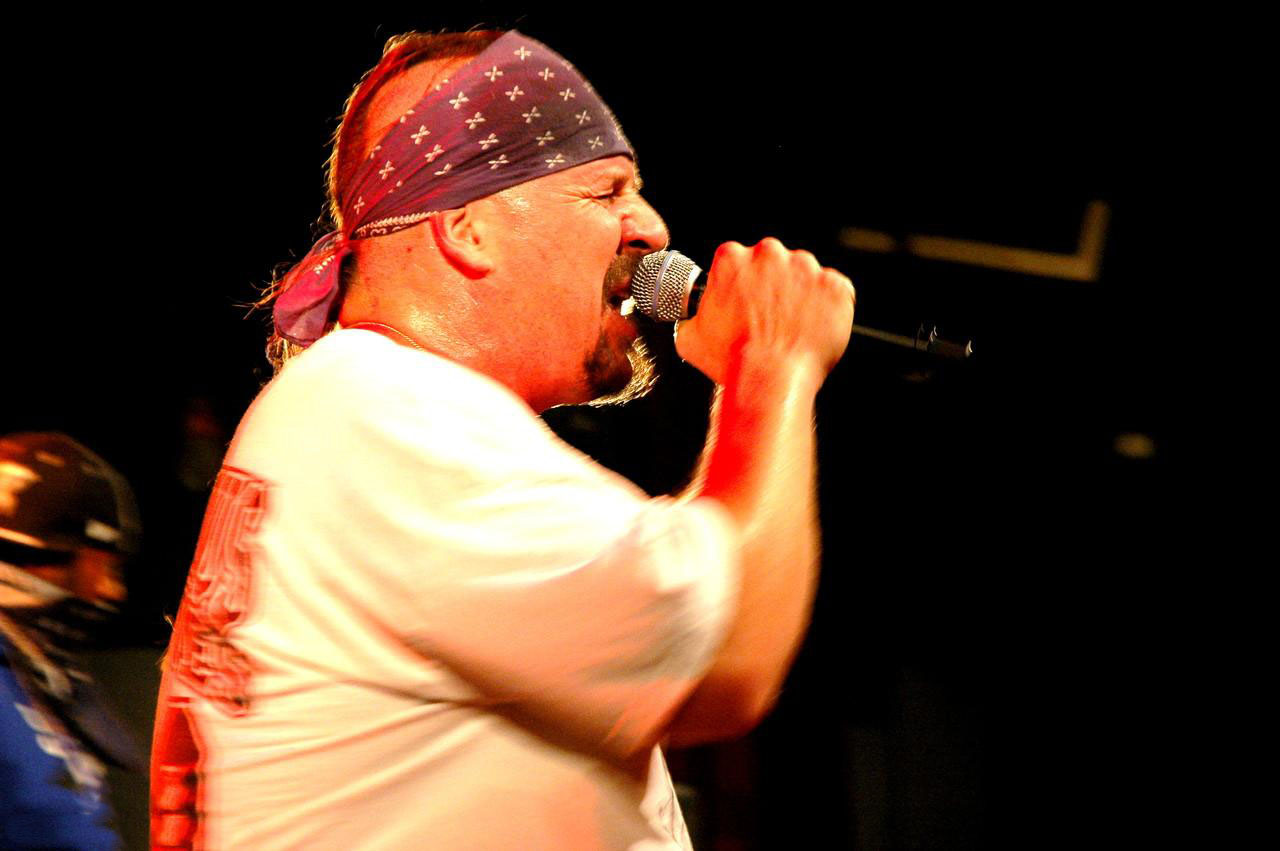
Mike Muir, frontman of crossover thrash band Suicidal Tendencies, who are often referred to as pioneers of the genre

By the mid–1980s, hardcore bands including the Bad Brains and Cro-Mags had begun to embrace the heavy riffing style of metal. In the following years, the earliest crossover albums were being released by groups across the United States, including Agnostic Front, N.Y.C. Mayhem and Stormtroopers of Death (New York); Cryptic Slaughter and Suicidal Tendencies (Greater Los Angeles); Corrosion Of Conformity (Raleigh, North Carolina); Dirty Rotten Imbeciles (Houston); and Negative Approach (Detroit).

New York thrash metal, in particular, already bore a greater emphasis on hardcore's influence, with metal band Anthrax often playing alongside New York hardcore bands. Around 1984 this relationship lead to hardcore bands Leeway and Agnostic Front beginning to write music influenced by thrash metal, followed by the formation of Stormtroopers of Death in 1985, by members of thrash metal Anthrax and Billy Milano of hardcore band the Psychos. With the national rise in popularity of thrash metal many original NYHC bands became increasingly heavier and harder in sound as the metal influences grew stronger, consequently some NYHC bands who were previously skinheads started growing their hair and adopting metal looks. Agnostic Front released the crossover album Cause for Alarm in 1986, which led many in the scene to deride them as sell outs. Writer Freddie Alva stated in a 2014 article that "[Cause for Alarm's] combination of heavy metal precision and hardcore energy created a landmark for the crossover sound". In the following years many crossover bands began to form within the scene, notably Crumbsuckers, Nuclear Assault and Ludichrist. The Cro-Mags released the crossover album, Best Wishes in 1989, which also heavily impacted the scene, which was cited as a major influence by much of the 1990s New York hardcore scene.

Los Angeles band Suicidal Tendencies, have been described by publications including Metal Hammer as "the godfathers of crossover", following their transition from hardcore into the genre on Join the Army (1987). The band would reach commercial success with their first two major-label albums, How Will I Laugh Tomorrow When I Can't Even Smile Today (1988) and Controlled by Hatred/Feel Like Shit... Déjà Vu (1989). Dirty Rotten Imbeciles's music took a similar direction with their last three albums of the 1980s, Crossover (1987), 4 of a Kind (1988), and Thrash Zone (1989).

=== Early 1990s to present: legacy and subsequent waves ===
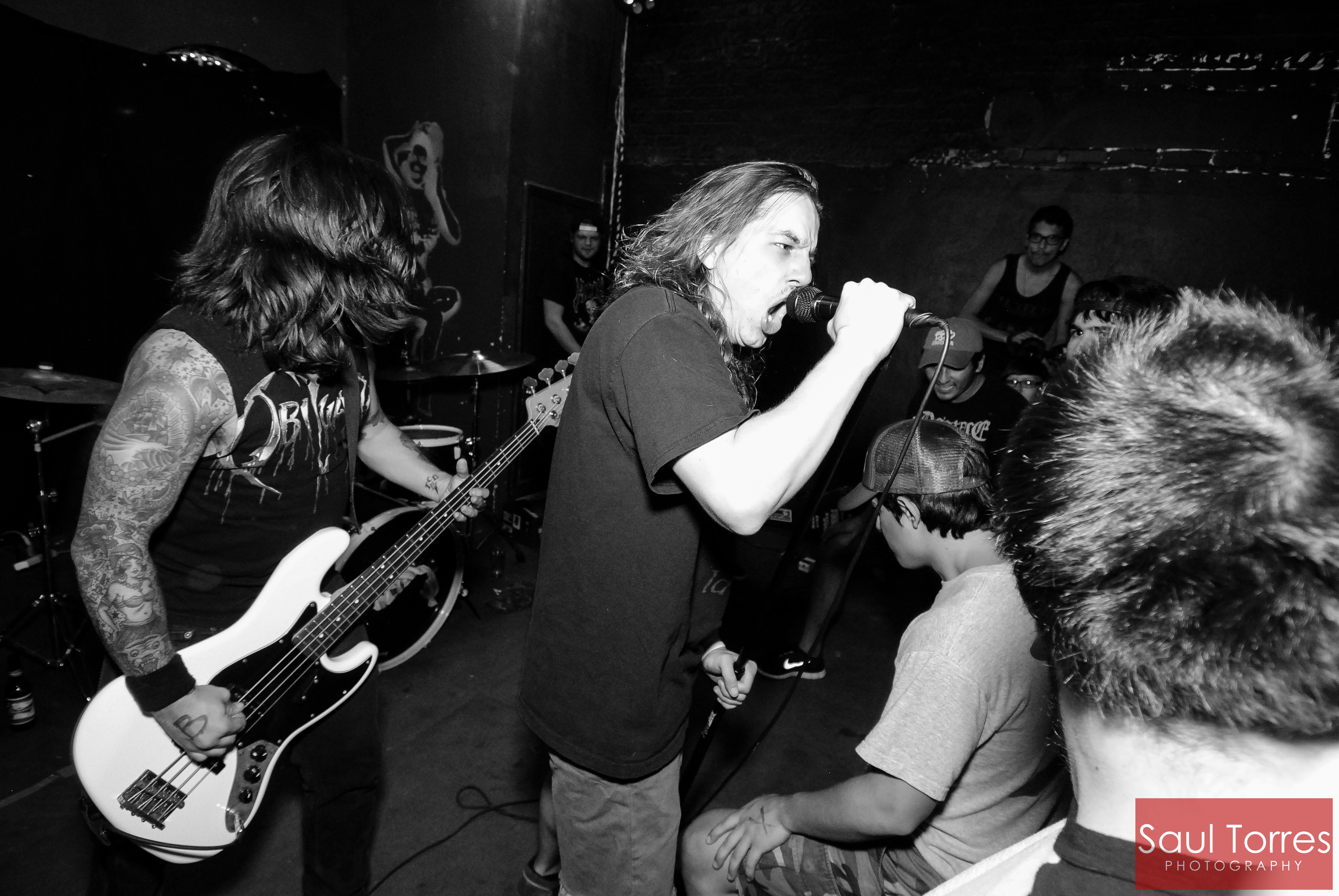
Power Trip, one of the most forefront crossover thrash bands of the 2010s

Crossover played a major role in the development of metalcore in the early 1990s. The sound remained prominent in that genre through pioneering groups including Ringworm, Rorschach, Merauder, All Out War and Integrity.

Municipal Waste were the forefront crossover act in the 2000s, being credited by publications including AllMusic and Spin as leading a revival of the genre. Other notable groups of this era included Short Sharp Shock, Send More Paramedics and Gama Bomb. During the late 2000s and early 2010s, crossover band Trash Talk gained significant success in the hardcore scene, which led to them signing to Tyler, the Creator's record label Odd Future Records. The band's fourth studio album 119 (2012) which peaked at number 119 on the Billboard albums chart. In 2018, Bandcamp Daily writer David Anthony credited Power Trip, Iron Reagan, Enforced, Mindforce, Iron Age, Red Death and Primal Rite as the leaders of a crossover thrash revival movement. In the 2020s, various publications credited the genre as being revived by groups including Drain and Pest Control.

== See also ==
- List of crossover thrash bands

== Bibliography ==
- Blush, Steven and Petros, George (2001). American Hardcore: A Tribal History. Los Angeles: Feral House. ISBN 0-922915-71-7.
- Waksman, Steve (2009). This Ain't the Summer of Love: Conflict and Crossover in Heavy Metal and Punk. Berkeley, CA: University of California Press. ISBN 978-0-520-25310-0.
