= 1990–1993 =

Compilation album by Crossed Out
- Released: 1999
- Recorded: December 15, 1990 – August 21, 1993
- Studio: 8 Studios (San Diego, California); The Headquarters; KSPC (Claremont, California); Ché Café (San Diego, California)
- Genre: Powerviolence
- Length: 44:05
- Label: Slap-a-Ham #55

Crossed Out chronology
Crossed Out (1992)	1990–1993 (1999)

Professional ratings
Review scores
Source	Rating
Ink19	Favorable
In Music We Trust	Favorable

1990–1993 is the discography compilation consisting of the entire recorded output of American powerviolence band Crossed Out, which was released in 1999 through Slap-a-Ham Records on compact disc and vinyl formats. The compilation includes previously released EP material as well as rare demos and live recordings. A limited edition of white-colored LP copies were released through direct mail order.

== Background ==
Crossed Out was formed in late 1990 by guitarist Scot Golia, drummer Tad Miller, bassist Rich Hart, and vocalist Dallas Van Kempen. The group issued a demo tape, a self-titled 7-inch, a split 7-inch with Man Is the Bastard, and a split 5-inch with Dropdead. The group also contributed two tracks to the Slap-a-Ham compilation 7-inch Son of Blleeaauurrggh, which also featured other prominent powerviolence and grindcore acts. The group would eventually break-up in 1993 after playing only 16 live shows total in the southern California area. The last five shows featured Eric Wood (from Man Is the Bastard) on the bass, for their original bassist Hart left the group by that point. One of these last few shows, which was recorded on August 21, 1993, at the Ché Café, is featured as the last four tracks on the 1990–1993 compilation.

== Track listing ==
No.	Title	Taken from	Length
1.	"Internal"	Crossed Out	0:37
2.	"He-Man"	Crossed Out	2:01
3.	"Locked In"	Crossed Out	0:52
4.	"Fraud"	Crossed Out	0:45
5.	"Crown of Thorns"	Crossed Out	0:37
6.	"Force of Habit"	Crossed Out	0:58
7.	"Crutch"	Crossed Out	2:05
8.	"Supremacy"	Split 5" with Dropdead	0:29
9.	"Ulcer"	Son of Blleeaauurrggh	0:12
10.	"Neglect"	Split 5" with Dropdead	0:31
11.	"Suffocate"	Split 5" with Dropdead	0:54
12.	"Selfserve"	Split 5" with Dropdead	0:34
13.	"Homegrown"	Son of Blleeaauurrggh	0:05
14.	"Crown of Thorns"	Previously Unreleased Recording	0:44
15.	"Internal"	Previously Unreleased Recording	0:38
16.	"Practiced Hatred"	Split 7-inch with Man Is the Bastard	0:26
17.	"Pure Delusion"	Split 7-inch with Man Is the Bastard	0:20
18.	"Society"	Split 7-inch with Man Is the Bastard	0:40
19.	"Lowlife"	Split 7-inch with Man Is the Bastard	0:32
20.	"Scapegoat"	Split 7-inch with Man Is the Bastard	0:36
21.	"Vacuum"	Split 7-inch with Man Is the Bastard	0:23
22.	"No Truth" (Christ on Parade cover)	Previously Unreleased December 15, 1990 Rehearsal Recording	1:08
23.	"Fraud"	Demo '91	0:44
24.	"Letch"	Demo '91	1:44
25.	"Never Forget"	Demo '91	1:37
26.	"He-Man"	Demo '91	2:00
27.	"Suicide of a Species"	Demo '91	2:20
28.	"Selfish Achiever"	Demo '91	1:27
29.	"Advice?"	Demo '91	1:31
30.	"Locked In"	Live On KSPC, March 27, 1992	1:03
31.	"Fraud"	Live On KSPC, March 27, 1992	0:54
32.	"Ulcer"	Live On KSPC, March 27, 1992	0:21
33.	"He-Man"	Live On KSPC, March 27, 1992	2:13
34.	"Internal"	Live On KSPC, March 27, 1992	0:45
35.	"Suffocate"	Live On KSPC, March 27, 1992	0:59
36.	"Supremacy"	Live On KSPC, March 27, 1992	0:51
37.	"Force of Habit"	Live On KSPC, March 27, 1992	1:12
38.	"Homegrown"	Live On KSPC, March 27, 1992	0:19
39.	"Selfserve"	Live On KSPC, March 27, 1992	0:37
40.	"Crown of Thorns"	Live On KSPC, March 27, 1992	0:55
41.	"Neglect"	Live On KSPC, March 27, 1992	0:45
42.	"Jihad"	Previously Unreleased 1992 Rehearsal Recording	0:58
43.	"Protestor" (Negative FX cover)	Previously Unreleased 1992 Rehearsal Recording	0:23
44.	"Pure Delusion"	Live At the Ché Café, August 21, 1993	0:34
45.	"Lowlife"	Live At the Ché Café, August 21, 1993	0:40
46.	"Nightstalker" (Impact Unit cover)	Live At the Ché Café, August 21, 1993	2:26
47.	"Practiced Hatred"	Live At the Ché Café, August 21, 1993	0:40

== Personnel ==
- Rich Hart - bass (tracks 1–43)
- Eric Wood - bass (tracks 44–47)
- Tad Miller - drums
- Scot Golia - guitar
- Dallas Van Kempen - vocals
- Alan Vangundy - recording (tracks 1–7)
