= Benümb =

American grindcore band

- Origin: Millbrae, California, U.S.
- Genres: Grindcore, thrashcore
- Years active: 1994–2006
- Labels: Relapse
- Past members: John Gotelli; Dave Hogarth; Paul Ponitkoff; Pete Ponitkoff; Tim Regan
- Website: benumb.net

Benümb was an American grindcore band from Millbrae, California.

== Biography ==
Formed in 1994 in Oakland, California, Benümb became known within the local hardcore community as a respected grindcore band. The band went through various lineup changes during their early years. After playing together for almost a year, a split 7-inch with Short Hate Temper was released in mid-1995 on the Same Day label. Benümb spent the next year and a half playing shows with bands including Man is the Bastard, Spazz, Exhumed, Dystopia and Capitalist Casualties, among others. In 1997 the band recorded and released numerous 7-inch records, including splits with Dukes of Hazzard and Apartment 213. Their live set at the "Fiesta Grande" festival was recorded and released as part of the Fiesta Comes Alive! LP on Slap-a-Ham Records. In late 1997 the Gear in the Machine 7-inch was released on the Relapse 7-inch series, and in 1998 a live split with Suppression, pressed on a flexi-disc, accompanied issue No. 3 of the fanzine Monkeybite.

In May 1998, Benümb released their first full-length album, Soul of the Martyr. The album was described as angry and intense, and contained 19 bonus tracks taken from previous splits and live performances. Soul of the Martyr was well received, and the band promoted the release by completing several mini-tours of the United States. Benümb also appeared at every major U.S. heavy music festival in the two years that followed, including the 1998 and 1999 Milwaukee Metalfests and the 1998 and 1999 March Metal Meltdowns.

In 2000, Benümb released the album Withering Strands of Hope. The album was produced by Bart Thurber (Spazz, Exhumed) at Oakland's House Of Faith. Guitarist Robb Koperski parted ways with the band in early 2001 due to personal issues. In Spring 2002, Benümb released a split 3" CD with labelmates Pig Destroyer. This split showed an evolution in the band's sound with the return of Paul Ponitkoff on guitar.

Benümb released By Means of Upheaval on Relapse Records in 2003, and a split with Premonitions of War in 2005. By Means of Upheaval continued the band's angry, punk-leaning grindcore sound, political lyrics, and short songs.

The band broke up in 2006. Pete Ponitkoff and John Gotelli have since formed Agenda of Swine, and have released an album on Relapse Records.

== Members ==
- Pete Ponitkoff – vocals
- John Gotelli – drums
- Dave Hogarth – guitar
- Paul Ponitkoff – guitar, vocals
- Tim Regan – bass

=== Former members ===
- Robb Koperski – guitar, vocals
- Mike V – guitar

== Discography ==
=== Studio albums ===
- 1998 – Soul of the Martyr CD/LP (Relapse Records)
- 2000 – Withering Strands of Hope CD/LP (Relapse Records)
- 2003 – By Means of Upheaval CD (Relapse Records)

=== Splits and EPs ===
- 1995 – split 7-inch with Short Hate Temper (Same Day Records)
- 1997 – split 7-inch with Apartment 213 (Stenchasaurus Records)
- 1997 – split 7-inch with Dukes of Hazzard (Rape An Ape Records)
- 1997 – Gear in the Machine 7-inch (Relapse Records)
- 1998 – split 7-inch with Suppression (Monkeybite Magazine)
- 1999 – split 7-inch with Bad Acid Trip (X Agitate 96 X Records)
- 2002 – split 7-inch with Agoraphobic Nosebleed (Relapse Records)
- 2002 – split CD with Pig Destroyer (Robotic Empire Records)
- 2005 – split CD with Premonitions of War (Thorp Records)

=== Compilation appearances ===
- 1997 – Bllleeeeaaauuurrrrgghhh! - A Music War 7-inch (Slap-a-Ham Records)
- 1997 – America in Decline LP/CD (Six Weeks Records)
- 1997 – El Guapo CD (Same Day Records/625 Records)
- 1997 – Fiesta Comes Alive LP/CD (Slap-a-Ham Records)
- 1997 – No Fate CD (H:G Fact Records)
- 1998 – Solid: Strip Mining the Underground Since 1990 CD (Relapse Records)
- 1998 – Hard Sound Part 1 CD (Trainwreck Records)
- 1998 – Contamination MCMXCVIII CD (Relapse Records)
- 1999 – Accidental Double Homicide Vol. 4 2×7″ (Satan's Pimps Records)
- 1999 – Reality Part 3 CD/LP (Deep Six Records)
- 1999 – Relapse Sampler CD (Relapse Records)
- 1999 – Contaminated 1999 CD (Relapse Records)
- 2000 – Barbaric Thrash Detonation CD + 7-inch (625 Records)
- 2000 – Contaminated 3.0 2xCD (Relapse Records)
- 2000 – Hurt Your Feelings CD (Six Weeks Records)
- 2000 – Menus with Manpower CD (KDVS Records)
- 2003 – Contaminated 5.0 2xCD (Relapse Records)
- 2001 – Transcendental Maggot CD (Meconium Records)
