= Charles Bronson (band) =

American hardcore punk band

- Charles Bronson performing live in 1997

Background information
- Origin: DeKalb, Illinois, U.S.
- Genres: Powerviolence; hardcore punk; thrashcore
- Years active: 1994–1997
- Labels: 625 Thrashcore; Slap-a-Ham
- Spinoffs: Das Oath
- Past members: Mark McCoy; Jon Arends; Ebro Virumbrales; James DeJesus; Mike Sutfin; Aaron Aspinwall; Jeff Jelen; Max Ward
- Website: ihateyouthattack.com

Charles Bronson was an American powerviolence band from DeKalb, Illinois, that was active from 1994 to 1997. Formed by vocalist Mark McCoy and bassist Jon Arends, the band were known for their very short, often fast-paced songs with lyrics that satirized the hardcore punk scene. During their existence, they released a sole studio album, Youth Attack!, along with a series of singles and split records which were all eventually compiled into a posthumous double CD in 1999, titled Complete Discocrappy.

== History ==
McCoy met Jon Arends at the end of McCoy's first year at Northern Illinois University in DeKalb, and the two agreed to start a fast hardcore band when classes resumed in the fall of 1994. They recruited James DeJesus and Ebro Virumbrales, and rehearsed weekly in Arends's parents' basement. The band's first release was a 14-song extended play on Six Weeks Records, the label run by Jeff Robinson of Capitalist Casualties, followed by a split record with the Northern Californian group Spazz; by that point guitarists Mike Sutfin and Aaron Aspinwall had joined. The band shared members with other hardcore groups, including Los Crudos and MK-Ultra.

McCoy ended the band in 1997, saying he felt it had done what he wanted and that he intended to leave the Midwest. The group toured the East Coast in its final months, and McCoy recorded the vocals for Youth Attack! in Chicago after it had already broken up. He founded the label Youth Attack Records in 1999 to reissue the band's recordings, saying it had become considerably more popular after splitting up.

== Musical style ==
The band borrowed from the early powerviolence of Infest. Laurent Barnard of Louder wrote that the group took the powerviolence template established by Spazz and added more humor to it, bridging grinding noise, youth crew hardcore and thrash punk. McCoy has cited The Neos' extended play Hassibah Gets the Martian Brain Squeeze as a template for the band's sound. Lyrically, the group tended towards satirical commentary on the hardcore punk scene. The group has been described as a "fast, screaming mess of tall, skinny guys with a lot to say (which you would only know if you read the liner notes)". Writing in Maximum Rocknroll, Felix Havoc of Code 13 dismissed the group as a parody band.

== Discography ==
=== Albums ===
- Youth Attack! (1997) – Lengua Armada/Coalition Records
- Complete Discocrappy 2xCD (1999) – 625 Thrashcore/Youth Attack Records

=== Demos and singles ===
- Demo Tape (1994) – self-released
- Charles Bronson (Diet Rootbeer) 7-inch (1995) – Six Weeks Records/Youth Attack Records
- Charles Bronson / Spazz Split 7-inch (1995) – 625, Evil Noise and Disgruntled Records
- Charles Bronson / Unanswered split 7-inch (1995) – Trackstar Records
- Charles Bronson / Ice Nine split 7-inch (1996) – Bovine Records
- Charles Bronson / Quill split 7-inch (1996) – Nat Records (Japan)

=== Compilations ===
- All That and a Bag o Dicks (1995) – Disgruntled Records
- Double Dose of Dicks – Disgruntled Records
- Speed Freaks (1995) – Knot Music
- Vida Life (1996) – Lengua Armada
- No Royalties (1996) – Bad People Records
- Cry Now, Cry Later Vol. 4 (1996) – Pessimiser/Theologian
- Another Probe 7-inch with a Girl on the Cover (1996) – Probe
- El Guapo (1996) – Same Day Records
- Possessed to Skate (1996) – 625 and Pessimiser Records
- Deadly Encounters (1997) – Agitate 96 and Kill Music Records
- Bllleeeeaaauuurrrrgghhh! A Music War (1997) – Slap A Ham Records
- Reality 3 (1997) – Deep Six Records
- Tomorrow will be Worse (1997) – Sound Pollution Records
- Mandatory Marathon (1997) – Amendment Records
- Hurt Your Feelings (2001) – Six Weeks Records
- Chicago's on Fire Again (2001) – Lengua Armada
- Skeletal Festival (2003) – self-released
