= No Comment (band) =

American powerviolence band

- No Comment performing live in 1990

Background information
- Origin: Sherman Oaks, California, U.S.
- Genres: Powerviolence; hardcore punk
- Years active: 1987-1993
- Labels: Slap-A-Ham; Noise Patch; Deep Six; Snare Dance
- Past members: Andrew Beattie; Vince Simpson; Brent Jones; Ralo Calzada

No Comment was an American powerviolence band from Sherman Oaks, California, that was active from 1987 to 1993. Originally performing under the name Nothing Matters, they were an important figure during the development of powerviolence, helping to pioneer the genre in the early 1990s.

== History ==
No Comment was formed in 1987 by vocalist Andrew Beattie, guitarist Vince Simpson, bassist Brent Jones, and drummer Ralo Calzada. Along with local bands such as Crossed Out, Capitalist Casualties, and Man Is the Bastard, No Comment were influential in what was known to become the "West Coast powerviolence" scene, particularly for their aggressive musical and conceptual take on the hardcore punk genre. Vocalist Andrew Beattie confessed to liking both the metal and hardcore genres while hating the direction crossover bands such as DRI and Discharge took, which combined the two styles. Beattie stated that his band "just wanted to show that 'Hardcore' was still alive yet there was no real 'scene in the late 80s'."

Concert flyer from 1991

No Comment disbanded in 1993 and Beattie went on to pursue many other musical projects, including vocal duties for Man Is the Bastard, Low Threat Profile (with members of Infest), Dead Language (with members of Iron Lung and Walls), and Dead Man's Life (with members of Life In A Burn Clinic, The Grim, Dead Lazlo's Place, For Sale, F.Y.P, Co-Ed, La Motta, It's Casual, Revolution Mother and Buford). Most recently, Beattie has fronted Bastard Collective, a powerviolence band consisting of members from Man Is the Bastard. However, some unreleased studio and live recordings have been released after this time.

== Legacy and influence ==
Andrew Beattie (left), Ralo Calzada (right), Brent Jones (bottom left), Vince Simpson (bottom right)

Powerviolence, according to Spazz vocalist and bassist Chris Dodge (who was behind the scene's leading record label, Slap-a-Ham), peaked in the mid-1990s, around the same time No Comment released their celebrated 1992 EP, Downsided, on Slap-a-Ham Records. XLR8R described Downsided as "a definitive document of powerviolence's beyond-tantrum aggression".

== Band members ==
- Andrew Beattie - vocals (1987-1993)
- Vince Simpson - guitar (1987-1993)
- Brent Jones - bass, vocals (1987-1993; died 2026)
- Ralo Calzada - drums (1987-1993)

== Discography ==
=== Exteneded plays ===
- No Comment (1987, Self-released)
- Common Senseless (1989, Snare Dance)
- Downsided (1992, Slap-a-Ham)

=== Live albums ===
- Live On KXLU 1992 (2013, Deep Six)

=== Compilation albums ===
- 87-93 (1999, Deep Six/Snare Dance)

== See also ==
- Slap-a-Ham Records
- Man Is the Bastard
- Powerviolence
