= Complete Discocrappy =

Compilation album by Charles Bronson
- Released: 1999
- Recorded: 1994–1997
- Genres: Hardcore punk, thrashcore, powerviolence
- Length: 86:15
- Label: 625 Thrashcore

Charles Bronson chronology
Youth Attack! (1997)	Complete Discocrappy (1999)

Complete Discocrappy is a compilation album by the American powerviolence band Charles Bronson, released in 1999 on 625 Thrashcore. The two discs collect the band's entire recorded output from 1994 to 1997; the first holds previously released material in chronological order and the second holds previously unreleased recordings. Mark McCoy founded the label Youth Attack Records in part to issue the collection and head off bootleggers. The album was pressed twice, in runs of 2,500 and 3,000 copies, and was held at the pressing plant for about four months.

The set includes a 40-page booklet reproducing the inserts, lyrics and photographs from the band's releases along with a band history, a discography and a fanzine interview, as well as a CD-ROM video collage of live footage running from CBGB to the band's final show.

Several songs are featured more than once due to having been recorded and released more than once. A few cover tracks are also on this album. The second disc includes a cover of a song by Infest.

== Reception ==
Reviewing the collection for Punknews.org, a writer credited as Bob described the band as playing "super fast and thrashy, humorous, intelligent, good clean fun, hardcore punk" and called the double CD "all that you'll ever need", noting that it gathers the band's demos, singles, split records, Youth Attack! and compilation appearances in one place.

== Track listing ==
=== Disc 1 ===
No.	Title	Length
1.	"Why Do You Bother?"	1:08
2.	"Little Debbie"	0:12
3.	"I'm Sick of Feminists"	0:34
4.	"Your Average Run of the Mill Straight Edge Song"	1:11
5.	"Ricki Lake"	1:19
6.	"Just Like All the Rest"	0:40
7.	"The Shane Song"	1:32
8.	"No More"	0:42
9.	"Can't Take This"	1:31
10.	"Theme Song"	0:53
11.	"I Can't Be in a Band With You Because You Like Epitaph (Beatdown Remix)"	0:31
12.	"Silenced"	1:24
13.	"Diet Root Beer"	0:46
14.	"Ebro's Bitter Onslaught on Jerry Springer's Unsuspecting Ass"	0:57
15.	"Sick of O.J."	0:28
16.	"Chicago"	0:18
17.	"Bible Thumpers Go to Hell"	0:42
18.	"Irrigation"	0:41
19.	"Security Blanket"	0:41
20.	"Why Do You Bother?"	0:38
21.	"Eavesdrop"	0:36
22.	"I Can't Be Friends with You Because You Like Epitaph"	0:56
23.	"Eazy-E's Fucking Dead and I Think it's Fucking Rad"	0:45
24.	"Second Hand Choke"	0:59
25.	"Theme Song"	0:49
26.	"Deaf and Dumb"	0:49
27.	"J.R.S Beatdown"	0:32
28.	"They Should Legalize Drugs So You Can Hurry Up And Fucking Die"	0:17
29.	"Crooked Teeth"	0:23
30.	"Political Prisoners"	0:09
31.	"Obligatory Jock Slaughter Song"	0:52
32.	"You Get What You Pay For"	0:21
33.	"Charles Bronson Will Not Turn into A ____ Band"	0:32
34.	"Rich Crusties Shall Pay"	0:33
35.	"Fuckin' Drunken Uncle"	0:39
36.	"Frat Guy on the Barbi"	0:37
37.	"I Lied When I Said I Liked Your Zine"	0:43
38.	"Playing Lotto"	1:01
39.	"Ants in the Kool-Aid"	0:42
40.	"What the Fuck are You Gonna Do When it's Cool to be Yourself?"	0:43
41.	"Craig Ferris Sucks a Mean Cock"	0:23
42.	"Phil Anselmo's Pain Burns in the Heart of My Little Brother"	0:52
43.	"The Kids Are Gonna Stick Together"	1:20
44.	"Tabloid Suckass"	0:42
45.	"Cheese With Your Whine"	0:47
46.	"4 Alarm Counter Fuck"	0:38
47.	"Annual Martyr to Your Social Life"	0:52
48.	"History in the Making"	1:03
49.	"Tony Victory Knows How to Party"	0:27
50.	"Down for the Count"	0:35
51.	"4 Hour Personality"	0:26
52.	"No Points for the Losers"	0:15
53.	"Drunk Punks is Hippies"	0:09
54.	"One Life Crew Goes on Slimfast"	0:21
55.	"Debate Team Bake Sale"	0:39
56.	"I Can Never Write Too Many Songs About Morons Like You"	0:50
57.	"Individualised Floor Puncher"	1:03
58.	"Batting a Thousand and Still Striking Out"	0:16
59.	"Let's Start a Revolution So I Can Break Some Shit"	0:24
60.	"The Great Pet Rock Comeback"	0:31
61.	"What's Wrong With Me? (Faith)"	0:43
62.	"Dream a Little Dream"	0:37
63.	"Punching a Gift Horse in the Mouth"	1:21
64.	"The Story of My Life"	0:48
65.	"Grown Up Corpses"	0:42
66.	"Bike Pig on a Rope"	0:22
67.	"I'm So Smart Now"	0:30
68.	"As Fucked as Gator"	0:34
69.	"Skate for God"	0:59
70.	"You Will Go (Steve Caballero)"	1:06
71.	"Better Never Than Late"	0:44
72.	"412 Wolfpack"	0:04
73.	"Marriage Can Suck It"	0:40
74.	"Youth Attack!"	0:37
75.	"The Painful, Yet Unavoidable, Deathstar Comparison"	0:38
76.	"xDumbfucksx"	0:37
77.	"Too Much of a Good Thing"	0:31
78.	"Standing in Front of Bulldog Records"	0:53
79.	"Stock Footage"	0:30
80.	"Pre(im)mature Retirement P.L.A.N"	0:36
81.	"The Only Time I Think About Romance Is When I Wonder Why I Don't Think About It"	0:28
82.	"Deaf and Dumb"	0:34
83.	"Fuck Technology, I'll Keep My Pocket Change"	0:58
84.	"Red and Green Make Yellow"	0:34
85.	"Let's Start Another War So I Can Sing About Stopping It"	0:19
86.	"I Just Can't Avoid the Void in "Avoid""	0:31
87.	"Wastoid on Celluloid"	0:38
88.	"Shrinkage"	0:31
89.	"Close Encounters of the Nerd Kind"	0:47
90.	"I.Q. 32 (Necros)"	0:19
91.	"Punch Drunk (Hüsker Dü)"	0:26
92.	"The Tears of a Clone"	1:32
93.	"Last Warning (Who Fucking Cares)"	0:38
94.	"Why Be Something That You're Not? (Good Question...)"	0:31
95.	"Rich Crusties... (Live)"	1:08
96.	"Seven More Shitty-Ass Songs (Live in Fuckin' Belgium)*" (A collection of several live tracks, separated with samples from a Slayer performance.)	6:37
Total length:		Disc 1 72:38

=== Disc 2 ===
No.	Title	Length
1.	"Why Do You Bother, Ebro?"	1:13
2.	"Couldn't Fucking Care Less"	0:28
3.	"Whatever Happened?"	1:01
4.	"Mindless (Blah Blah Blah)"	0:43
5.	"The Worm Song"	0:34
6.	"The Kids Are Gonna Stick Together"	0:55
7.	"Falling Off – Do It!"	0:23
8.	"E.S.P Girls Love Me"	0:52
9.	"Wailing Guitar Solos Vol. 1: A Chronology"	0:53
10.	"(Fuck Being) Positive"	0:31
11.	"???"	0:54
12.	"???"	0:41
13.	"So What if I Puked Up McDonald's?"	0:44
14.	"Moodswinger"	0:23
15.	"Ralph on Ralph"	0:51
16.	"Twiggy on My Mind"	0:16
17.	"Cous Cous on the Loose Loose"	0:07
18.	"Telecom USA"	0:13
19.	"I Go to School"	0:09
20.	"Cross Me (Project X)"	0:26
21.	"Untitled (xDekalb Hatedge Foreverx)"	1:20
Total length:		Disc 2 13:38; Total86:15

== Personnel ==
The following line-up is listed for the release.

- Mark McCoy – Vocals
- James DeJesus – Guitar (Disc 1, Tracks 1–10; Disc 2, Track 1)
- Mike Sutfin – Guitar (Disc 1, Tracks 11–17; Disc 2, Tracks 2–21)
- Aaron Aspinwall – Guitar (Disc 1, Tracks 26–56; Disc 2, Tracks 2–15)
- Jeff Jelen – Guitar (Disc 1, Tracks 72–96; Disc 2, Tracks 16–19)
- Jon Arends – Bass
- Ebro Virumbrales – Drums (Disc 1; Disc 2, Tracks 1–19)
- Max Ward – Drums (Disc 2, Tracks 20 and 21)
