= Amps for Christ =

American musical project

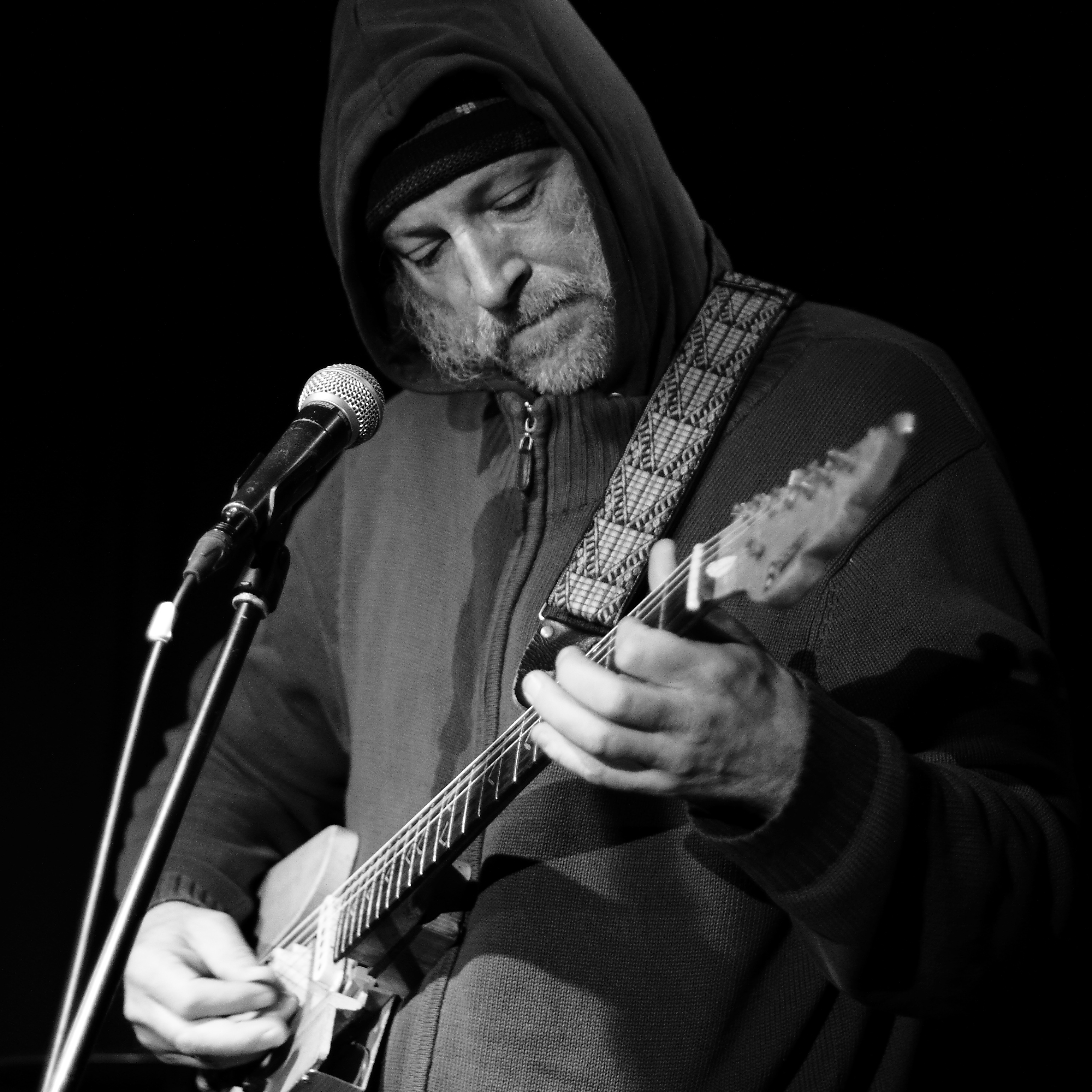
- Amps for Christ at Club W71, Weikersheim, 2016

Background information
- Origin: Claremont, California, United States
- Genres: Experimental rock
- Years active: 1995?–present
- Members: Henry Barnes
- Website: Archive of the band's website as it appeared in 2006

Amps For Christ is the current music project of Man Is the Bastard and Bastard Noise veteran and metal/noise pioneer Henry Barnes. The project is based out of Claremont, California.

== Concept ==
Conceptually, Amps for Christ originated in 1996, when Barnes met recording enthusiast and The Dull band member Enid Snare. Barnes decided that he wanted to combine his experience with experimental noise and extreme metal with his love for traditional folk music, classical composition and jazz. Barnes and his friend and fellow Man Is the Bastard veteran Joel Cornell started Two Ambiguous Figures, in which Barnes played the sitar and Cornell played the tabla. Fiddling with the traditional Indian instruments led to the creation of Amps for Christ, known for its esoteric and geographically diverse instrumentation. Barnes also wanted to add an element of technical sound making to the project. Barnes and his collaborators often modify or create their own musical instruments in order to get specific sounds for their tracks. Some examples of these instrument and sound creations include stringed instruments, pre-amps, amplifiers and other acoustic instruments. Barnes reportedly is fascinated with waveform manipulation, a theme that is prominent throughout Amps for Christ.

== Influences ==
Barnes, well known in the experimental music scene, attributes his desire to experiment with sound to his eclectic childhood tastes in music. Barnes' interest in folk music stemmed from his mother, a traditional ballad singer and folk music enthusiast. Barnes' father, an avid John Cage enthusiast, jazz singer/songwriter, and washboardist, also had a large effect on the project that would become Amps for Christ. Barnes also credits his grandmother, a church organist, with great effect on his music. The music's political component derives in part from the left wing ideals of Man is the Bastard.

== Works ==
Amps for Christ strives for diversity among its musical creations, which, perhaps intentionally, makes the project hard to define. The tracks put out by Amps for Christ are experimental sound ventures that attempt a fluid and organic union with folk poetry and structured acoustic music. Some are mostly noise (Imitation) whereas other tracks refer to the European folk tradition (Enid's Rant). Many are also reminiscent of early 70's American folk-rock (Flowers And Leaves). The project emphasizes multicultured, multilayered, and multi-genred composition as well as broadly ranged themes. Many tracks treat love, peace, problems with modern capitalism, and Barnes' relationship with God (Branches).

== Other members and guest appearances ==
Amps for Christ projects often include Enid Snarb on electronics, Tara Tikki Tavi on Chinese instruments/vocals and Charlie White with poetry.

Barnes' friends make guest appearances on tracks, notably Marz of Pyramids On Mars, members of Scam (band), VomitToxin, Barnes' brother R. Barnes, and Barnes' dad R.G. Barnes.

Erika M Anderson, of GOWNS, also appears sometimes, playing guitar notably on "Empire".

== Discography ==
- The Plains of Alluvial, tape (1995, Shrimper)
- The Secret of the Almost Straight Line, 7" (1996, Westside Audio Labs)
- Beggars Garden, CD (1997, Shrimper)
- Thorny Path, LP/CD (1997, Vermiform)
- Songs from Mt. Ion, CD (1998, Total Annihilation)
- Circuits, CD (1999, Vermiform)
- "AFC/Jalopaz split", 7" (1999, Manufracture)
- Electrosphere, CD (2000, Shrimper)
- The Oak in the Ashes, CD (2001, Shrimper)
- "AFC/1-Eyed Cyclops split", 7" (2001, Empty Chairs)
- The People at Large, CD (2004, 5RC)
- AFC/Bastard Noise, CD (2005, Helicopter)
- Every Eleven Seconds, CD (2006, 5RC)
- Split with woods, Lp (2012, woodist)
- Split with Winters In Osaka and Eric Wood, Lp (2013 Endtyme/Vorkuta)
- Canyons Cars And Crows Lp, CD (2014, Shrimper)
- AFC/NBDY/Rehgrafsivart - Season of the Dog collab LP. (2014, Dog Bless You Records, Czech Republic)
- AFC/Failings Split 10" (2014, Insulin Addict Records, Macedonia)
- AFC/Witches of Malibu - Indian Hill collab Cassette (2015, Kitty Play Records)
- Evil Normal, Cassette (2015, Kitty Play Records)
- Cliff Parade/The Crossroads Of Agony, split LP with Bastard Noise, Vinyl (2021, To Live A Lie)
