= Rupture (band) =

Australian hardcore punk band

Rupture was a hardcore punk band from Perth, Australia, that formed in the 1980s and were active until around late 2001, when vocalist Gus Chamber died. During this time they released split EP's with many bands including Brutal Truth, Dropdead, Spazz, Extortion and Antiseen as well as individual releases such as Righteous Fuck and Sex Drugs and Rupture. The line up on their 1997 release Hate Makes The World Go Round is listed as Bass - Zombo, Drums - Dick Diamond, Guitar - Stumbles, Vocals - Gus Chamber.

== Partial discography ==
=== Albums ===
- Rupture Mass slaughter permit tape 1989 Yeah Mate! Records
- Rupture/Belchig Beat lp Ecocentric Records 1990
- Rupture compilation lp "Traped in A tooth gear" Two Sheds Records 1992
- Rupture forceps ep 7" Extune Tontrager
- Corrupture (2 versions) Yeah Mate! Records 1992
- Dropdead / Rupture (8", Ltd, Spl) Highly Collectable Records 1993
- Fuck Your Life... (Cass, Comp) Yeah Mate! Records 1993
- Lust And Hate (LP) SOA Records 1994
- Elektra Complex (7", EP, Ltd, Gre) Fudgeworthy Records 1995
- Lust And Hate (CD, Album) Ecocentric Records 1995
- Sex, Drugs And Rupture (Album) (2 versions) Yeah Mate! Records ... 1995
- Brutal Truth / Rupture (7", Pic) Rhetoric Records, Deaf American Recordings 1997
- Freudstein's House (7", EP) Regurgitated Semen Records 1997
- Hate Makes The World Go Round (7") Bad Card Records 1997
- Brutal Badlands (CD, Comp) HG Fact 1999
- Cunt Of God (CD, Album) Rhetoric Records 1999
- Righteous Apes (CD, Comp, Ltd) Yeah Mate! Records 1999
- GG. Allin = God (7", EP) No Fucking Labels 2001
- Suicide Boogie / I'm The Man (7") Snapshot Records (3) 2001
- Netjajev Society System / Rupture (7") Haunted Hotel Records 2004
- Extortion / Do The Bonobo Bop! (5", Yel) Hate Ape Productions 2008
- Untitled (7", Pic) No Fucking Labels, Rescued From Life Records, Breathlike Violence 2008

=== Split compilation albums ===
- 3 Way Split (Cass) I (Bringer Of Destruct... Shindy Productions 1998
- In League / Know Your Knot / Rupture 3 way 5"
- Happy Birthday Gride! (7") I (Bringer Of Destruct... Insane Society Records 2001
- "Tribute Through Butchery" EP (7", EP) Sick Of Fucken Shit Regurgitated Semen Records 2003
- Modorra / Fistula (Album) (2 versions) Shat From The Womb Plague Island Records 2008

=== Compilations ===
- Son of Bllleeeeaaauuurrrrgghhh! (7", EP, Comp, Gra) Brains Of Buds Slap A Ham Records 1992
- Reproach (8 Modern Hardcore Bands Cover Negative Approach) (7", Comp) Negative Approach Ugly Pop Records 1998
- Regurgitation (7", Comp) Saapaat Sludge Records, Bad Card Records 1999
- I Kill What I Eat (CD, Album, Comp, Ltd) The Earth Is Already D... Ecocentric Records 2007
- Revive Us Again - The Voices Of Inspiration Of A Machination World (7", EP, Comp) My God Can Do Anything Machination Records

=== Unofficial releases ===
- Bllleeeeaaauuurrrrgghhh! - The CD (CD, Comp) Brains Of Buds Goatsucker Records 2003
- Split (Lathe, 6") Head Full Of Junk Not On Label

=== Other split LPs ===
- Rupture / Beltching Beet Ecocentric Records

=== Other split EPs ===
- Rupture / The Scroungers
- Rupture / Mob 48
- Rupture / Bristning
- Rupture / Senseless Apocalypse
- Rupture / Spazz
- Rupture / Slavestate
- Rupture / Masskontroll
- Rupture / Flächenbrand
- Rupture / Stupid Babies Go Mad
- Dropdead / Rupture
- Rupture / Netjajev SS
- Unborn-SF / Rupture
- ANTiSEEN / Rupture
- Skrupel / Rupture
- Rupture / The Nerds
- Rupture / Nihilistics
- Rupture / Cripple Bastards
- Rupture / Straight Edge Kegger
- Rupture / Opposition Party
- Extortion / Rupture
- Rupture / Jewman Pregnant
