= Crossed Out =

Californian powerviolence band

- Origin: Encinitas, California
- Genre: Powerviolence
- Years active: 1990–1993
- Label: Slap-a-Ham
- Past members: Tad Miller; Scot Golia; Rich Hart; Eric Wood; Dallas Van Kempen

Crossed Out was a powerviolence band from Encinitas, California. The band was active from early 1990 until late 1993. The group is considered to be a very important band that helped define powerviolence with a style that incorporated political lyrics, blast beats, and quick tempos. They have been named as the "dark lords of powerviolence" by Beau Beasley of Insect Warfare.

== History ==
Crossed Out played sixteen shows and released a demo, 7-inch, split 7-inch with Man Is the Bastard, split 5" with Dropdead, and two songs for the Son of Blleeaauurrggh compilation. Many bands, such as The Locust, Dropdead, Su19b, Slices, and Iron Lung, have covered songs originally performed by Crossed Out.

In 1991, Spazz bassist and vocalist Chris Dodge, who also ran Slap-a-Ham Records, asked the band to send him a demo. Five months after that recording, in the fall of 1991, their seven-song self-titled 7-inch was released, including a firing squad cover photo. In 1992, the band recorded a live radio show on KSPC, a split 5" with Dropdead, a contribution to Slap-a-ham's Son of Blleeaauurrggh compilation 7-inch, and a split 7-inch with Man is the Bastard. By 1993, Crossed Out, along with Man is the Bastard, No Comment and Capitalist Casualties, played 924 Gilman Street's first power violence-only show, the Fiesta Grande. After the departure of original bassist Rich Hart, Eric Wood - bassist and vocalist of Man is the Bastard - volunteered to play bass; he remained with the group until their break up. The summer that followed, Dropdead toured the U.S. with the release of their split 5", playing two shows with Crossed Out. An August 1993 show with Spazz, Anal Cunt, and Dropdead, titled "Grindcore Night", on a flyer at Gilman St., led to the vocalist's comment "Fuck grindcore". "Fuck Grindcore" later became a bootleg 10-inch of their self-titled record. The group broke up in late 1993.

== Members ==
- Tad Miller – drums (1990–1993)
- Scot Golia – guitars (1990–1993)
- Rich Hart – bass (1990–1993)
- Eric Wood – bass (1993)
- Dallas Van Kempen – vocals (1990–1993)

== Discography ==
EPs

- Demo '91 (1991, Self-released)
- Crossed Out 7-inch EP (1992, Slap-A-Ham)
- Crossed Out/Dropdead split 5" with Dropdead (1992, Crust/Selfless/Rhetoric)
- Crossed Out/Man Is the Bastard split 7-inch with Man Is the Bastard (1993, Slap-A-Ham)

Compilation Albums

- 1990-1993 discography CD/LP (1999, Slap-A-Ham)

Compilation Appearances

- Son of Blleeaauurrggh 7-inch (1993, Slap-A-Ham)

Unofficial Albums

- Live 10-inch (1996, Noize For The Masses Records)
- Fuck Grindcore 10-inch (1998)
