= Youth Attack! =

1997 album by Charles Bronson

Studio album by Charles Bronson
- Released: 1997
- Genres: Hardcore punk, thrashcore, powerviolence
- Label: Lengua Armada Discos

Charles Bronson chronology
Youth Attack! (1997)	Complete Discocrappy (1999)

Youth Attack! is the only studio album by the American powerviolence band Charles Bronson, released in November 1997 on Lengua Armada Discos. Issued on 12-inch vinyl, it collects 20 songs in about 13 minutes. The band broke up the year of its release, and its recordings were later gathered on the compilation Complete Discocrappy.

A 10-inch version of the album was also issued. Its fourth pressing was released in August 1999 as a Dutch edition on 10-inch vinyl rather than 12-inch.

== Background ==
Vocalist Mark McCoy recorded the album's vocals in Chicago after the band had already broken up, and said most of its songs were never performed live.

== Reception ==
Writing for Louder, Laurent Barnard called the album an unlikely classic, citing its "poor production, indecipherable lyrics and average musicianship" while noting that it "continues to fight its way into punk enthusiasts' record collections". He described the band as taking the template of Spazz and adding more humour, bridging grinding noise, youth crew hardcore and thrash punk.

== Track listing ==
No.	Title	Length
1.	"Marriage Can Suck It"	0:40
2.	"Youth Attack!"	0:37
3.	"The Painful, Yet Unavoidable, Death Star Comparison"	0:38
4.	"xDumbfucksx"	0:37
5.	"Too Much of a Good Thing"	0:31
6.	"Standing in Front of Bulldog Records"	0:53
7.	"Stock Footage"	0:30
8.	"Pre(im)mature Retirement Plan"	0:36
9.	"The Only Time I Think About Romance Is When I Wonder Why I Don't Think About It"	0:28
10.	"Deaf and Dumb"	0:34
11.	"Fuck Technology, I'll Keep My Pocket Change"	0:58
12.	"Red and Green Make Yellow"	0:34
13.	"Let's Start Another War So I Can Sing About Stopping It"	0:19
14.	"I Just Can't Avoid the "Void" in "Avoid""	0:31
15.	"Wastoid on the Celluloid"	0:38
16.	"Shrinkage"	0:31
17.	"Close Encounters of the Nerd Kind"	0:47
18.	"I.Q. 32" (Cover version of a Necros song)	0:19
19.	"Punch Drunk" (Cover version of a Hüsker Dü song)	0:26
20.	"Tears of a Clone"	1:32
