= Discography 1991–1993 =

Compilation album by Dropdead
- Released: 1994
- Genre: Powerviolence
- Label: Armageddon

Dropdead chronology
Dropdead (1993)	Discography 1991–1993 (1994)	Hostile 7" (1996)

Discography 1991–1993 is a compilation album released in 1994 by American powerviolence band Dropdead on Armageddon. The album consists of songs from previously released EPs.

== Track list ==
No.	Title	Length
1.	"Unjustified Murder"	1:14
2.	"Doorway to Extinction"	0:35
3.	"Strength in Your Conviction"	0:56
4.	"Protest"	0:26
5.	"At the Cost of an Animal"	0:59
6.	"Direct Action"	0:11
7.	"Power"	0:42
8.	"Chosen Path"	0:33
9.	"Survival"	0:55
10.	"Bullshit Tradition"	0:35
11.	"Wounds Run Deep"	0:58
12.	"Do you Choose Life"	0:51
13.	"Ignorant"	0:36
14.	"Only a Fool"	0:35
15.	"You Have a Voice"	1:05
16.	"Washed Away"	0:25
17.	"Living in Fear"	0:19
18.	"Confused (Buried Deep)"	0:28
19.	"Attention"	0:22
20.	"Deliver Yourself"	0:17
21.	"Control"	0:56
22.	"Life in Chains"	0:50
23.	"End the Slaughter"	0:12
24.	"I Will Defy"	0:29
25.	"The Truth Behind"	0:20
26.	"Fucking Assholes"	0:19
27.	"Legacy of Death"	0:52
28.	"No Glory"	1:08
29.	"Still You Follow Blindly"	1:05
30.	"Wake of Deception"	1:13
31.	"Swedish Medley"	1:38
32.	"New World Slaughter"	0:39
33.	"Sheep"	0:21
34.	"Belly Full of Lies"	0:22
35.	"Requiem"	0:20
36.	"Bosnia"	0:25
37.	"Nazi Atrocities"	0:21
38.	"Whatever I Do"	0:53
39.	"The Circle Complete"	2:01
