= Doormat =

Doormat may refer to:

- Mat, a piece of fabric material that is placed on a floor or other flat surface
- "Doormat", song by No Doubt on their 1992 album No Doubt
- "Doormat", song by Spazz on their 1994 album Dwarf Jester Rising
- John Doormat, main character of the eponymous 1950s cartoon series
