= Man Is the Bastard =

American hardcore punk band

- Man Is the Bastard performing live at 924 Gilman Street in 1997

Background information
- Also known as: Charred Remains
- Origin: Claremont, California, U.S.
- Genres: Powerviolence; hardcore punk; noise rock; sludge metal
- Years active: 1990–1997
- Labels: Gravity; Vermiform; Slap-a-Ham; Deep Six
- Spinoffs: Bastard Noise
- Spinoff of: Pissed Happy Children; Neanderthal
- Past members: Eric Wood; Andrew Beattie; Aaron Kenyon; Joel Connell; Henry Barnes; Bill Nelson; Isreal Lawrence; Shawn Connell

Man Is the Bastard was an American hardcore punk band from Claremont, California. They existed from 1990 to 1997, releasing mostly split records, extended plays, and compilation albums on obscure labels from around the world. Along with contemporaneous bands such as Crossed Out, No Comment, and Capitalist Casualties, Man Is the Bastard are often recognized as one of the most prominent acts of the 1990s powerviolence movement, with some critics even citing them as originators of the genre. After their dissolution, members went on to form various other musical projects, most notably being the noise group Bastard Noise, which originally started out as a side project of the band under the name Man Is The Bastard Noise.

Since disbanding, Man Is the Bastard’s members have been involved in a number of different musical endeavors. Vocalist and bassist Eric Wood occasionally performs in the Los Angeles area as Bastard Noise, while bassist Aaron Kenyon and drummer Joel Connell continue to play in a variety of progressive rock acts such as Frank Booth Youth, Bastard Lounge, Controlling Hand, Lux Nova Umbra Est, and Umbra Vita. Vocalist Andrew Beattie has since continued doing vocals within the hardcore punk/powerviolence genre, performing in such bands as Controlling Hand, Low Threat Profile, Infest, as well as Dead Language, a supergroup featuring members from No Comment, Iron Lung, Brainoil, and Cave State. Beattie’s current band, Dead Mans Life, performs in the Los Angeles area, and his solo band, Institute of Infinite Sorrow, is still active today.

== Musical style and artwork ==
=== Musical style ===
Man Is the Bastard (aka Charred Remains) has been described as powerviolence (a term that was created by Matt Domino, a member of Eric Wood's previous band Neanderthal), hardcore punk, noise rock, and sludge metal. The band's "set up" included two bass guitars, as well as dual vocals, performed by Wood and Kenyon. The band is also notable for their extensive use of noise, even going as far as creating the noise side-project Bastard Noise, which still actively make releases to this day. This heavy noise influence was brought into the band's sound in part by band member Henry Barnes, who brought his electronics into the band's sound. Barnes made his own electronic instruments from scratch. Man Is the Bastard's recordings are characterized by their thin, raw low fidelity production values.

=== Lyrical content ===
The band's lyrics are often political and dark, with common themes being animal rights, violence, misanthropy, torture, police brutality, starvation, and depression. Man Is the Bastard's lyrical violence was balanced by their adamant advocacy of progressive ideals. This record of political activism resulted in their most widely available album, 1997's split LP with death row prisoner Mumia Abu-Jamal.

=== Artwork ===
Artistically most of their releases had a similar design, with their trademark skull on both sides of the words Man Is The Bastard with the release title underneath in quotations. The band's "skull logo" was originally taken from a medical book that Eric Wood was reading. Most of their recordings included simplistic liner notes that briefly explained each track's meanings. When artwork was used, it was typically stark, standing out against a basic layout. In 2012 the band Akron/Family used the skull logo for a t-shirt design. In response, Eric Wood accused of the band of plagiarism. Subsequently, the parties reconciled.

== Influence ==
The band is now seen as a critical part of the California powerviolence movement. Spazz bassist and operator of Slap-a-Ham Records Chris Dodge has called the group "the most unique band of their day". The folk punk band AJJ reference the group on the track "Do Re and Me" on their 2014 album Christmas Island.

== Band members ==
=== Final lineup ===
- Eric Wood - vocals, bass (1990-1997)
- Andrew Beattie - vocals (1993-1997)
- Aaron Kenyon - vocals, bass (1990-1997)
- Joel Connell - drums (1990-1997)
- Henry Barnes - guitars, electronics (1990-1997)
- Bill Nelson - electronics (1997)
- Isreal Lawrence - vocals, electronics (1997)

=== Past members ===
- Shawn Connell - guitar on Charred Remains / Pink Turds In Space EP (1991)

== Discography ==
=== Studio albums ===
Year	Album Details	Notes
1991	Sum of the Men: "The Brutality Continues...": Released: 1991; Label: Vermiform Records; Format: LP	First issued as an LP in 1991, later reissued as a compact disc including extra tracks taken from various 7-inch releases
1995	Thoughtless...: Released: 1995; Label: Gravity Records; Format: LP	First issued in 1995 as an LP. Two versions of the LP was released: one pressed on white vinyl, the other released as a picture disc. Gravity Records later issued the album on CD format in 1996. In 2012, Gravity reissued a remastered version of the album on LP pressed on three colors: orange, purple, and black.
2016	The Honesty Shop: Released: June 24, 2016; Label: Robotic Empire; Format: LP	Limited to 400 copies, all on clear candy-colored pink vinyl, housed in a screenprinted, single-pocket jacket with a double-sided, screenprinted lyrics insert.

=== Extended plays ===
Year	Album Details	Notes
1992	Abundance of Guns: Released: 1992; Label: S.O.A. Records; Format: 7"	First issued through S.O.A. Records in 1992 in Italy on black and red vinyl. DP later released the 7" in the US in 1993 with different artwork on clear and black vinyl. Deep Six Records reissued the recording as a 10" in 2014, this time pressed on clear and green vinyl with the same artwork as the DP 7" edition. Both the DP and Deep Six editions include the extra track "Regression of Birth". The original S.O.A. 7" would later be released in its entirety as a single track on their 2003 compilation album Old Days Nostalgia.
1992	Backwards Species: Released: 1992; Label: Eccocentric Records; Format: 7"	First issued through Eccocentric in Germany in 1992, later repressed by Deep Six Records in the US in 2014 on purple, tan, and orange vinyl.
1993	Our Earth's Blood: Released: 1993; Label: Vermiform Records; Format: 7"	Released by Vermiform in 1993 in the US.
1993	Uncivilized Live: Released: 1993; Label: Deep Six Records; Format: 7"	Collection of tracks recorded live, recorded throughout 1992 at various places: KSPC Radio, Claremount, Ché Café, San Diego, and the Munchies, Pomona. Pressed on green, clear, purple, and pink vinyl.
2015	The Lost MITB Sessions: Released: October 16, 2015; Label: Deep Six; Format: 12"	Features previously unreleased material recorded in 1997. 500 copies were pressed on black vinyl, 400 were pressed on random solid colors, and 100 were pressed as a red/green/orange/yellow mix, or "sunburst".

=== Split records ===
Year	Album Details	Notes
1991	Pink Turds In Space/Charred Remains AKA Man Is the Bastard: Released: 1991; Label: Slap-a-Ham Records; Format: 7"	First pressing consisted of 1500 green copies in black-and-white sleeves. Second pressing consists of 500 black copies in red-and-white sleeves. Split with Pink Turds In Space.
1992	Dis-Corporation/The Power of Hash: Released: 1992; Label: DP; Format: 7"	The first pressing came in photocopied sleeves. The second pressing came in a green photocopied sleeve. The third pressing was a joint release between DP and Deep Six records, which was pressed on purple vinyl. These first three 7" pressings all came out in 1992. Later in 1996, Deep Six repressed the split on green, orange, and purple vinyl. In 2012, the split was reissued as a 10" through Deep Six, mostly on black vinyl, although 70 mail-order translucent pink copies were pressed as well. Split with Aunt Mary.
1992	"The Brutality Continues...": Released: 1992; Label: DP; Format: 7"	Pressed on black, clear, and translucent yellow vinyl. Split with UND.
1992	Crossed Out/Man Is the Bastard: Released: 1992; Label: Slap-A-Ham Records; Format: 7"	First pressing consisted of 2000 black copies, 1000 packaged in blue sleeves, 1000 packaged in red sleeves. A second pressing was made, with alternative artwork that resembles closely to the band's "uniform" artwork style. The second press consists of pink, green, blue, and grey colored vinyl copies. Split with Crossed Out.
1993	Bleeding Rectum/Man Is the Bastard: Released: 1993; Label: DP; Format: LP	First issued as a split LP in 1993 by DP. Deep Six would later repress the album in 2013 on black and blue marbled vinyl. Split with Bleeding Rectum.
1993	>>Under the Surface: Smashed Visions<<: Released: 1993; Label: Farewell Records; Format: 7"	Released by Farewell Records in Germany in 1993 as an edition of 2000: 1700 black copies, 300 pink copies. Split with Pink Flamingos.
1993	Sanctity of Oil: Released: 1993; Label: DP; Format: 7"	Released in 1993 by DP as a 7" pressed on black and orange vinyl. In 2013, Deep Six reissued the split as a 10" on brown, green, and orange vinyl. Split with Bizarre Uproar.
1994	Sources Of Power From Another World: Released: 1994; Label: DP; Format: LP	Released in 1994 by DP with a limited edition silver cover variant, both versions limited to an unknown number of copies. Split with Bizarre Uproar.
1994	Throne of Apprehension/Provoked Behavior: Released: 1994; Label: Theologian Records Pessimiser Fanzine; Format: 7"	1200 copies had black-and-white cover art, 300 copies had red-and-white art, and an unknown number of copies came in purple-and-white cover art. Split with Agathocles.
1994	Capitalist Casualties/Man Is the Bastard: Released: 1994; Label: Six Weeks; Format: LP	First issued by Six Weeks in 1994. Later repressed in 2009 on black and grey vinyl. The grey edition was limited to 200 copies. Split with Capitalist Casualties.
1994	A Call For Consciousness: Released: 1994; Label: Vermiform Records; Format: 8"	Split with Born Against. Test pressings were pressed on 10" vinyl.
1995	Man Is the Bastard/Sinking Body: Released: 1995; Label: Vermiform Records; Format: 7"	Split with Sinking Body.
1995	Our Earth's Blood Pt.2: Released: 1995; Label: King of the Monsters; Format: 10"	Pressed on black, translucent red, yellow/red mix, and yellow. Yellow copies were an edition of 150 and were packaged in alternative artwork. Split with The Locust.
1997	Mumia Abu-Jamal Spoken Word With Music By Man Is The Bastard: Released: 1997; Label: Alternative Tentacles; Format: LP, CD	As well as being a split with Mumia Abu-Jamal, the recording features contributions by Assata Shakur, Allen Ginsberg, Jello Biafra, and Bob Dole.
1997	Nazi Drunks Fuck Off/Native American Life: Released: 1997; Label: Vibrator Records; Format: LP	Split LP with Bastard Noise, a noise project featuring members of Man Is the Bastard. The split compiles various live recordings performed between the years 1994 to 1996. Released in edition of 500 through Vibrator Records in Japan.

=== Compilation albums ===
Year	Album Details	Notes
1995	D.I.Y.C.D.: Released: 1995; Label: Slap-A-Ham Records; Format: CD	Compilation album containing material released on early 7" releases. Later repressed in 2006 by Deep Six.
2000	Mancruel: Released: 2000; Label: Deep Six Records; Format: CD	Compilation containing material previously released on the band's split with Bleeding Rectum and Capitalist Casualties, as well as previously unreleased Bastard Noise material.
2013	First Music/First Noise: Released: 2013; Label: Deep Six Records; Format: 7"	Features tracks taken from the band's splits with Pink Turds In Space and UND. Pressed on black and blue vinyl.
2015	A Call For Consciousness/Our Earth's Blood: Released: 2015; Label: Deep Six Records; Format: 10"	Contains material from the band's split with Born Against as well as the entire Our Earth's Blood 7". Pressed on black and green vinyl.
2016	Under the Surface/Smashed Visions/Anger And English/De-Programming The Bigot: Released: December 1, 2016; Label: Deep Six Records; Format: 10"	Pressed on purple vinyl.

=== Compilation appearances ===
Year	Album Details	Song(s)
1992	Son Of Bllleeeeaaauuurrrrgghhh!: Released: 1992; Label: Slap-A-Ham Records; Format: 7"	"Autopsy of Authority"
1992	In the Spirit of Total Resistance: Released: 1992; Label: Profane Existence; Format: 2x7"	"Homo Afflictus"
1993	Fear of Smell: Released: 1993; Label: Vermiform Records; Format: LP, CD	"Combat Weed"
1993	Revive Us Again: The Voices of Inspiration of a Machination World: Released: 1993; Label: Machination Records; Format: 7"	"Funeral For Fargo" "Goodbye"
1994	Cataclastic Fracture (A Noise Collection): Released: 1994; Label: Deadline Records Lazy Squid; Format: CD	"Human Plecostomus"
1994	No Desire To Continue Living: Released: 1994; Label: Farewell Records Re-Education; Format: 10"	"Chubby" "Military Prayer"
1995	Golden Shower of 72 Hits': Released: 1995; Label: Lost and Found Records; Format: 2xCD	"...Telephone Call To Lost And Found"
1995	Cry Now, Cry Later Volume 3: Released: 1995; Label: Theologian Records Pessimiser Fanzine; Format: 2x7"	"Faces of the Men"
1995	Anger And English: Released: 1995; Label: Frame Work; Format: 2x7"	"Tomb Ride" "Mr. Wilson" "Flying Limbs"
1995	KXLU 88.9FM Los Angeles Live Volume 1: Released: 1995; Label: KXLU; Format: CD	"Slay or Slander"
1996	Reality: Released: 1996; Label: Deep Six Records; Format: 7"	"Tomb Ride"
1997	Reality Part 2: Released: 1997; Label: Deep Six Records; Format: LP, CD	"Untitled"
1998	Reproach (8 Modern Hardcore Bands Cover Negative Approach): Released: 1998; Label: Ugly Pop Records; Format: 7"	"Dead Stop"
1998	Cry Now, Cry Later Volumes 3 & 4: Released: 1998; Label: Pessimiser Records; Format: CD	"Faces of the Men"
1998	Under Your Influence: Released: 1998; Label: Tralla Records; Format: CD	"Man Is the Bastard"
1998	Ham Slappin' Hits!: Released: 1998; Label: Slap-A-Ham; Format: CS	"Stocks" "Autopsy of Authority"
2003	Old Days Nostalgia: Released: 2003; Label: S.O.A. Records; Format: 3xCD	The entirety of the Abundance of Guns 7" as a single track.
2009	A Product of Six Cents II: Released: April 25, 2009; Label: A Product of Six Cents To Live A Lie; Format: CD	"No Concern For the Inhuman"
