= Hellnation =

- Origin: Covington, Kentucky, U.S.
- Genres: Powerviolence; thrashcore; hardcore punk
- Years active: 1988-2010
- Labels: Sound Pollution, Slap-A-Ham, Backwoods Butcher
- Past members: Albert Veith; Doug Long; Ken Hansford; Mark Estes; Chris Dodge

Hellnation was a hardcore punk band from Covington, Kentucky. The band was active from 1988 to 2010.

The band's sound has been described as thrashcore, powerviolence and grindcore. Hellnation's style was composed of quick guitar riffs, large amounts of distortion, and angry, often profane lyrics. Lyrical subjects included police brutality, consumerism, and the underground punk scene. They completed numerous tours of the United States, Japan, Brazil and Europe.

Originally, Albert Veith was the band's original bassist, however due to the group being unable to find a drummer he switched to the drums. Doug Long joined the group soon after as the bassist before leaving in 1999. Mark Estes was then asked to play bass. After Estes left, Long rejoined. They broke up in January 2010, having released numerous records, most of which were released through guitarist Ken Hansford's label Sound Pollution. Members of the band have since played in groups such as Erectile Dementia, Brody's Militia, and Jacked Up Zeros.

In early May 2023, Albert Veith, drummer and lead vocalist of Hellnation, died after being hit by a car.

== Band members ==
- Albert Veith – drums, lead vocals (died 2023)
- Ken Handsford – guitar, vocals
- Doug Long – bass, vocals
- Mark Estes – bass
- Chris Dodge – bass (live member that filled in during their 1999 European tour)

== Discography ==
=== Studio albums ===
- Colonized LP (Sound Pollution, 1993)
- Control LP/CD (Sound Pollution, 1994)
- Your Chaos Days Are Numbered LP/CD (Sound Pollution, 1998)
- Fucked Up Mess LP/CD (Sound Pollution, 1999) (reissued by Laja in Brazil in 2001)
- Cheerleaders for Imperialism LP/CD (Slap-A-Ham, 2000)
- Dynamite Up Your Ass LP/CD (Sound Pollution, 2002) (reissued by Laja in Brazil in 2004)

=== Extended plays ===
- People's Temple 7-inch (Sound Pollution, 1990)
- Suppression 7-inch (Sound Pollution, 1991)
- Aussie 7-inch (Spiral Objective, 1994) (released in Australia, also known as Untitled)
- At War With Emo 5" (Slap A Ham, 1997)
- Thrash Or Die: Japanese Hardcore Covers EP (MCR, 1998) (released in Japan)

=== Splits ===
- Hellnation/Real Reggae split 7-inch (Slightly Fast, 1996) (released in Japan)
- Hellnation/CFUDL split 7-inch (Sound Pollution, 1996)
- Hellnation/Sink split 7-inch (Sound Pollution, 1997)
- Hellnation/Merda split 7-inch (2+2=5/Luna, 2001) (released in Brazil)
- Hellnation/Capitalist Casualties Split LP/CD (Sound Pollution/Six Weeks, 2008)

=== Compilation albums ===
- A Sound Like Shit CD (Sound Pollution, 1996)
- Thrashwave CD (Sound Pollution/Laja, 2002) (released through Laja in Brazil)

=== Compilation appearances ===
- Bbblleeaauurrgghh 7-inch (Slap-A-Ham, 1991)
- Bloodless Unreality 7-inch (Forfeit, 1992)
- I Kill What I Eat CD (Ecocentric, 1992) (released in Germany)
- No Desire To Continue Living 10-inch (Farewell, 1993) (released in Germany)
- ABC's Of Punk LP+7"/CD (Whirled Records, 1997)
- Tomorrow Will Be Worse 4×7″ box set (Sound Pollution, 1998)
- Fiesta Comes Alive LP/CD (Slap-A-Ham, 1998)
- Homeless Benefit 2×7″ (Bad Card, 1999) (released in France)
- Reality Vol. 3 LP/CD (Deep Six, 1999)
- Tomorrow Will Be Worse CD (Sound Pollution, 2001)
- All Punks Spending Drunk Night 7-inch (Backwoods Butcher, 2006)
