= Bastard Noise =

American noise band

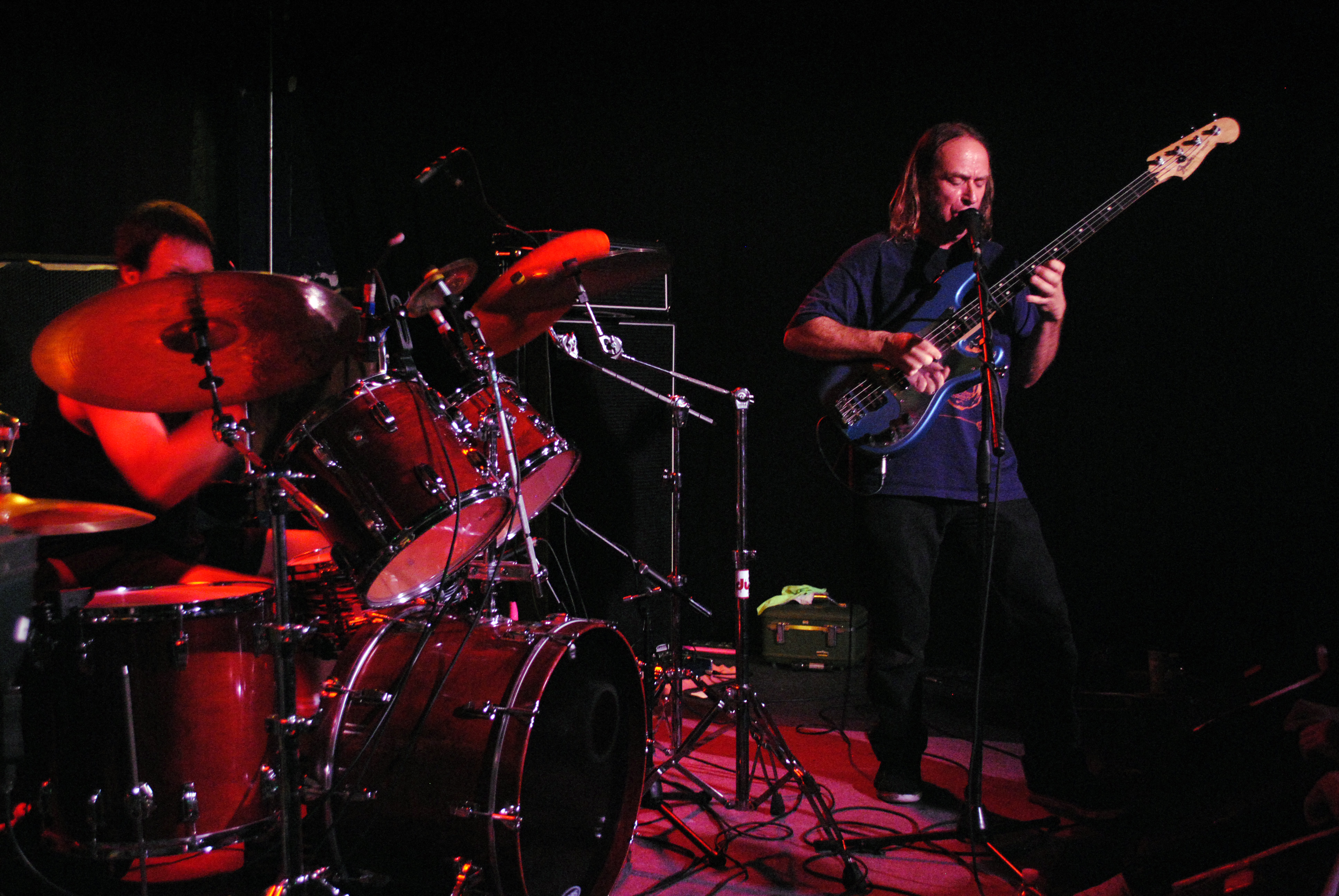
- Live on June 23, 2010, in Raleigh, NC

Background information
- Also known as: Man Is the Bastard Noise (early)
- Origin: Claremont California, U.S.
- Genres: Noisecore; Powerviolence
- Years active: 1997–present
- Labels: Three One G, Gravity, Deep Six, Vermiform, Robotic Empire, Kitty Play, L White, Ground Vault, Alien8, Hear More!, Manufacture, Housepig, Haunted Hotel, Thumbprint Press, Triage
- Members: Eric Wood
- Past members: Henry Barnes; Danny Walker; Joel Connell; W.T. Nelson; John Wiese

Bastard Noise is an American noise band founded in 1991 by musicians Eric Wood, Henry Barnes, and W. T. Nelson. The project started as a type of sister band to the trio's previous group Man Is The Bastard. While Man Is the Bastard broke-up in late 1997, the Bastard Noise project continued and acts as Wood's current project.

Early recordings from the group's extensive discography were mostly self-released and predominantly featured only electronics and vocals. Since its formation, however, Bastard Noise have made releases with underground labels such as Three One G, Relapse Records, Gravity Records, Deep Six, Vermiform Records, Robotic Empire, among others.

During live performances, Wood often recruits other musicians to perform with him, the likes of which have included Merzbow, Justin Pearson, Keiji Haino and most recently Saira Huff. Instruments such as the bass guitar and the drum kit were later incorporated down the band's history. Wood has expressed distaste for digital distribution and prefers to release his music exclusively on physical formats, although he has made few digital-only releases in the past.
