= KSPC =

Radio station at Pomona College

- Claremont, California; United States
- Broadcast area: Riverside–San Bernardino, California
- Frequency: 88.7 MHz
- Branding: The Space

Programming
- Format: Free-form radio

Ownership
- Owner: Pomona College

History
- First air date: February 12, 1956
- Call sign meaning: "Space"

Technical information
- Licensing authority: FCC
- Facility ID: 52922
- Class: A
- ERP: 510 watts
- HAAT: 21 meters (69 ft)
- Transmitter coordinates: 34°8′33″N 117°43′17″W

Links
- Public license information: Public file; LMS
- Webcast: Listen live
- Website: kspc.org

KSPC is a college and community radio station based in Claremont, California, broadcasting at 88.7 MHz on the FM band and streaming online. It was founded in 1956 as a Pomona College student organization and later expanded to the other Claremont Colleges (7Cs). KSPC is funded by the Associated Students of Pomona College and other 7C student associations.

== History ==
The station was preceded by KPCR-AM from 1951 to 1955, which went off the air after the Federal Communications Commission raised objections to its carrier current signal.

KSPC's first broadcast occurred on February 12, 1956, on the campus of Pomona College. Station manager Ron McDonald and program director Terry Drinkwater launched the station with an anonymous donation of $4,000. In his inaugural address, McDonald laid out the station's mission: "We don't feel that it is the purpose of KSPC merely to duplicate programming already available on other radio stations, but rather to provide our listeners with a desirable type of programming not readily available in the area."

KSPC was located in Pomona College's Replica House from 1956 until the mid-1970s, when the station received a major anonymous donation and constructed upgraded studios in the basement of Pomona's Thatcher Music Building. It remains there today.

The Claremont Colleges' director of student media, Erica Tyron, has worked at the station since she was a student at Scripps College in the late 1980s. Since 1995, the station has hosted an annual CD and record expo.

== Programming ==
KSPC's music programming is divided into general blocks by genre: Underground, Jazz, Classical, Americana, Electronic music and Hip hop. The station is also home to a variety of eclectic specialty shows highlighting niche genres, including soul, polka, reggae, film soundtracks, video game music, and children's music. KSPC programming also includes news, public affairs, talk and sports coverage.

The station's programming philosophy is geared toward supporting local and independent content.

=== Sports broadcasting ===
The sports broadcasting department of KSPC was started in 1981 when the FCC suggested that the station needed to expand its community-based programming. Geoff Willis ('83) sat in the stands for a pre-season Pomona-Pitzer women's basketball game and created an audition tape by doing play-by-play into a small hand held dictaphone. KSPC began broadcasting home basketball games for both Men's and Women's Pomona Pitzer basketball games during the 1981–1982 season, including the women's team's remarkable run to the NCAA Division III Final Four. James Timmerman ('82) covered the play-by-play while Willis provided color commentary. After the Sagehens advanced to the Final Four with a 62–53 overtime victory over Scranton, a frantic fundraising effort allowed the embryonic sports broadcasting department to travel to Harrisburg, Pennsylvania to provide its first remote sports broadcast live from the Final Four. KSPC covered both the Final Four game and the consolation game. Of historical interest was that the only two electronic media covering the 1982 Women's Division III Final Four Basketball Tournament were KSPC and a very young ESPN. Also of significance in its first season of existence, KSPC's sports broadcasting department aired Willis' pre-game interview of Pomona-Pitzer men's head basketball coach Gregg Popovich – the first radio interview ever given by Popovich as a head coach at any level. Popovich went on to win five NBA titles as the head coach of the San Antonio Spurs.

In the fall of 1982, KSPC began broadcasting home Sagehen football games. Later that year, KSPC expanded its basketball coverage to add league away games as well as full home coverage for the men's and women's basketball games. Willis took over the play-by-play duties with a rotating series of color commentators. When the women's basketball team qualified for the Western Regionals, KSPC travelled to Moorhead Minnesota to broadcast two games from the campus of the Concordia College "Lady Cobbers." In addition, during the fall of 1982 KSPC began broadcasting a weekly sports talk and reporting show and was able to broadcast live interviews with Dodger manager Tommy Lasorda, Laker Kareem Abdul-Jabbar and other local sports figures.

KSPC offices in Thatcher Music Building

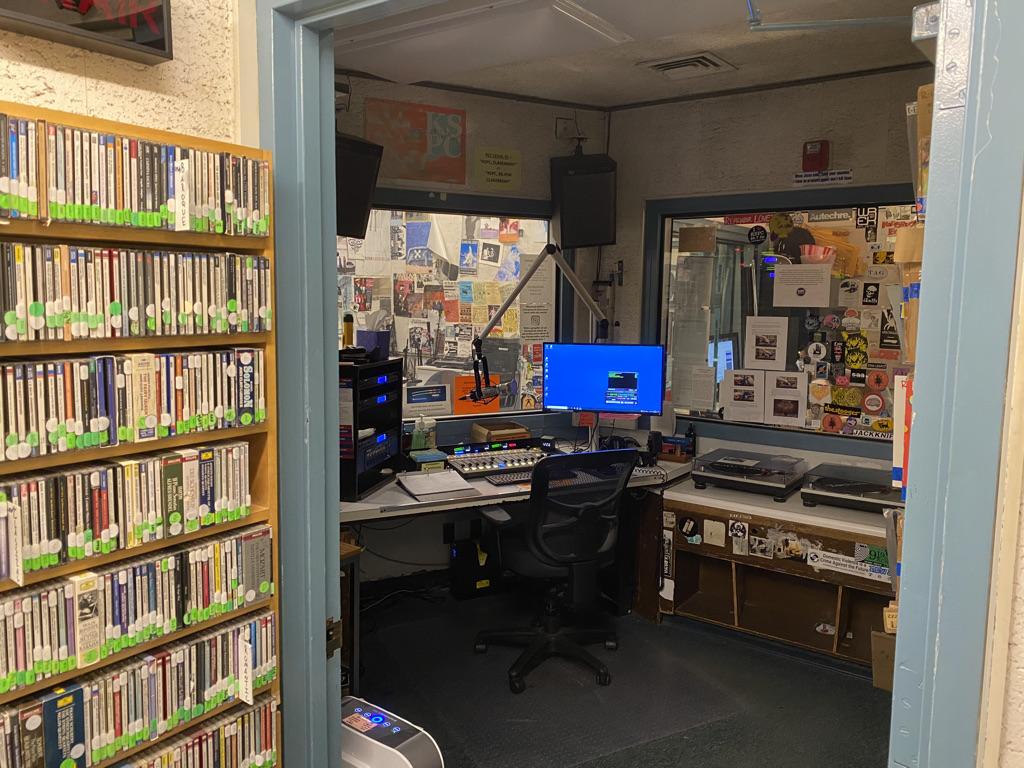
Primary recording booth

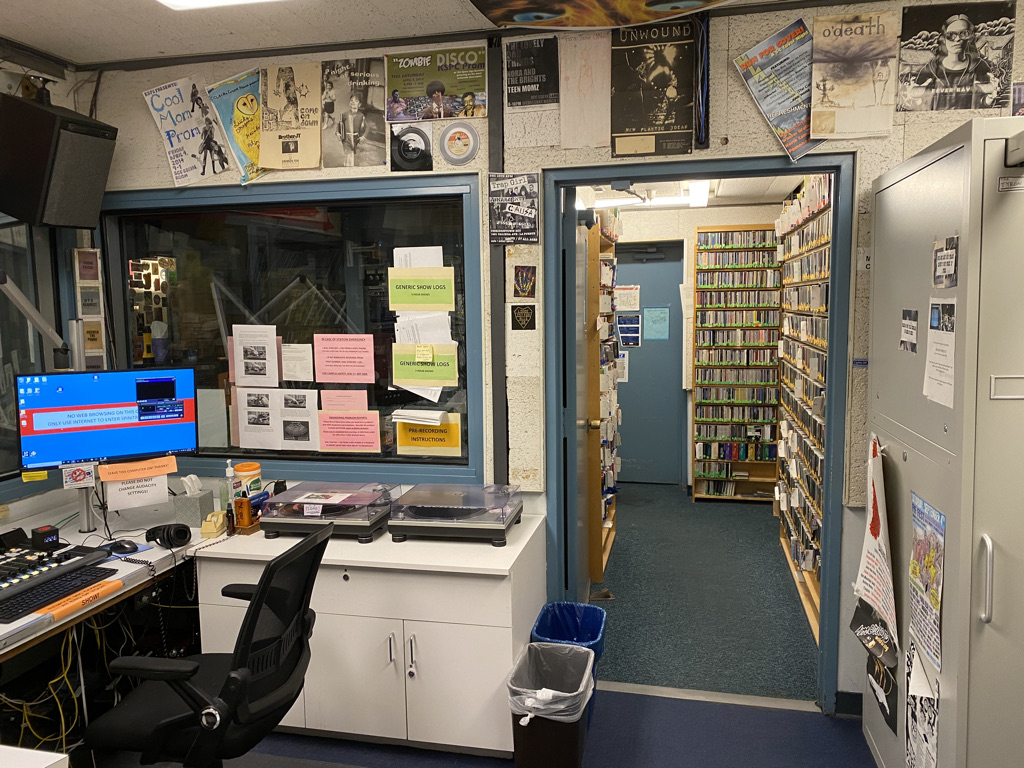
Secondary recording booth

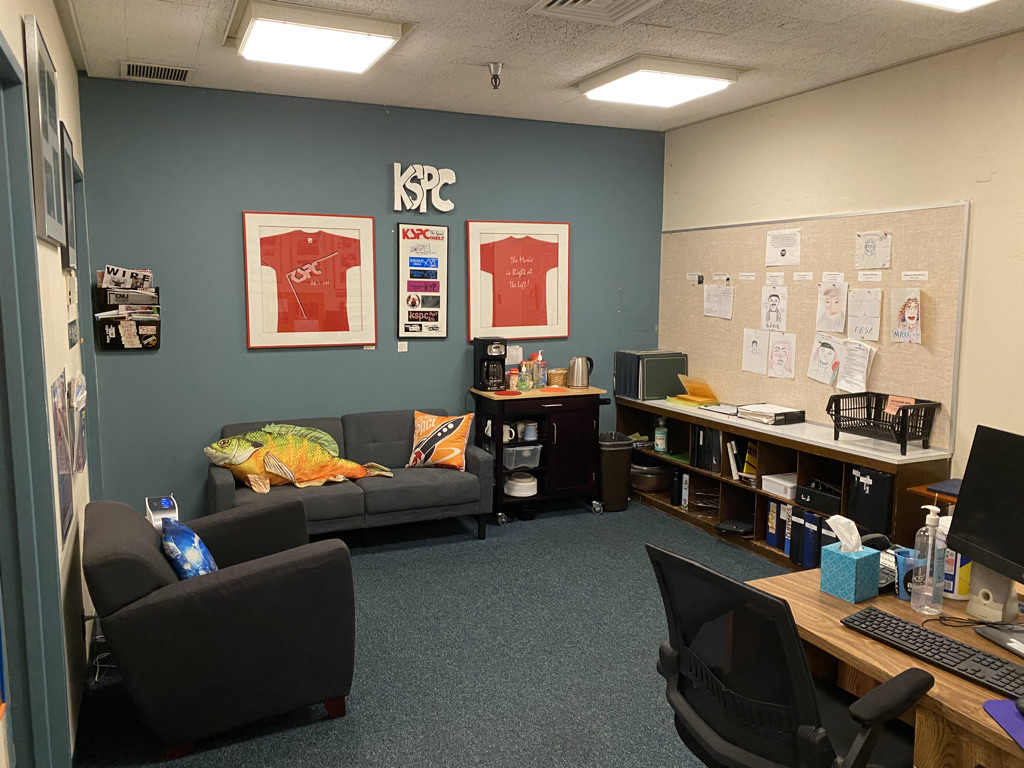
Antechamber

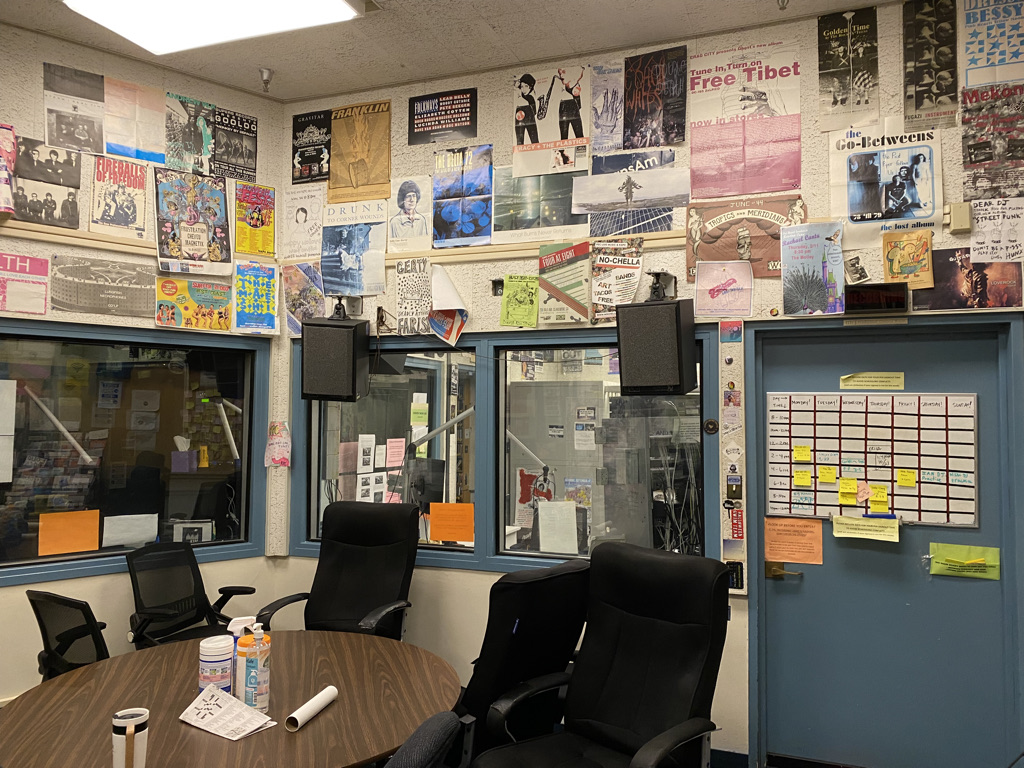
Live studio space

== Operation ==
KSPC is an active organization at the Claremont Colleges, and often works in cooperation with other students groups in support of social events, speakers, and special opportunities. In the past, KSPC has either supported or been supported by (or both) the Associated Students of Pomona College (ASPC), the Pitzer College Student Senate, The Student Life newspaper, the Pomona Women's Union, and the Pomona College Organic Farm.

== Noted artists ==
In late 1962 and early 1963 Frank Zappa hosted The Uncle Frankie Show which ran Saturday nights from 11 pm–1 am. Zappa was a Pomona College student for short time, studying under ASCAP composer Karl Kohn. The program was usually pre-recorded by Zappa at his Rancho Cucamonga, California recording facility, Studio Z. A few highlights from these tapes have appeared on authorized Zappa archival releases. Zappa later appeared on the station as a guest on various KSPC programs in the late 1960s.

On November 5, 1979, The Ramones played a concert at Garrison Theater at The Claremont Colleges as part of KSPC's new wave/punk concert series that year and provided an in-studio interview with on-air personality Huge Bonair.

The Dust Brothers met at KSPC in 1985.

== See also ==
- Campus radio
- List of college radio stations in the United States
