= Dropdead =

American hardcore punk band

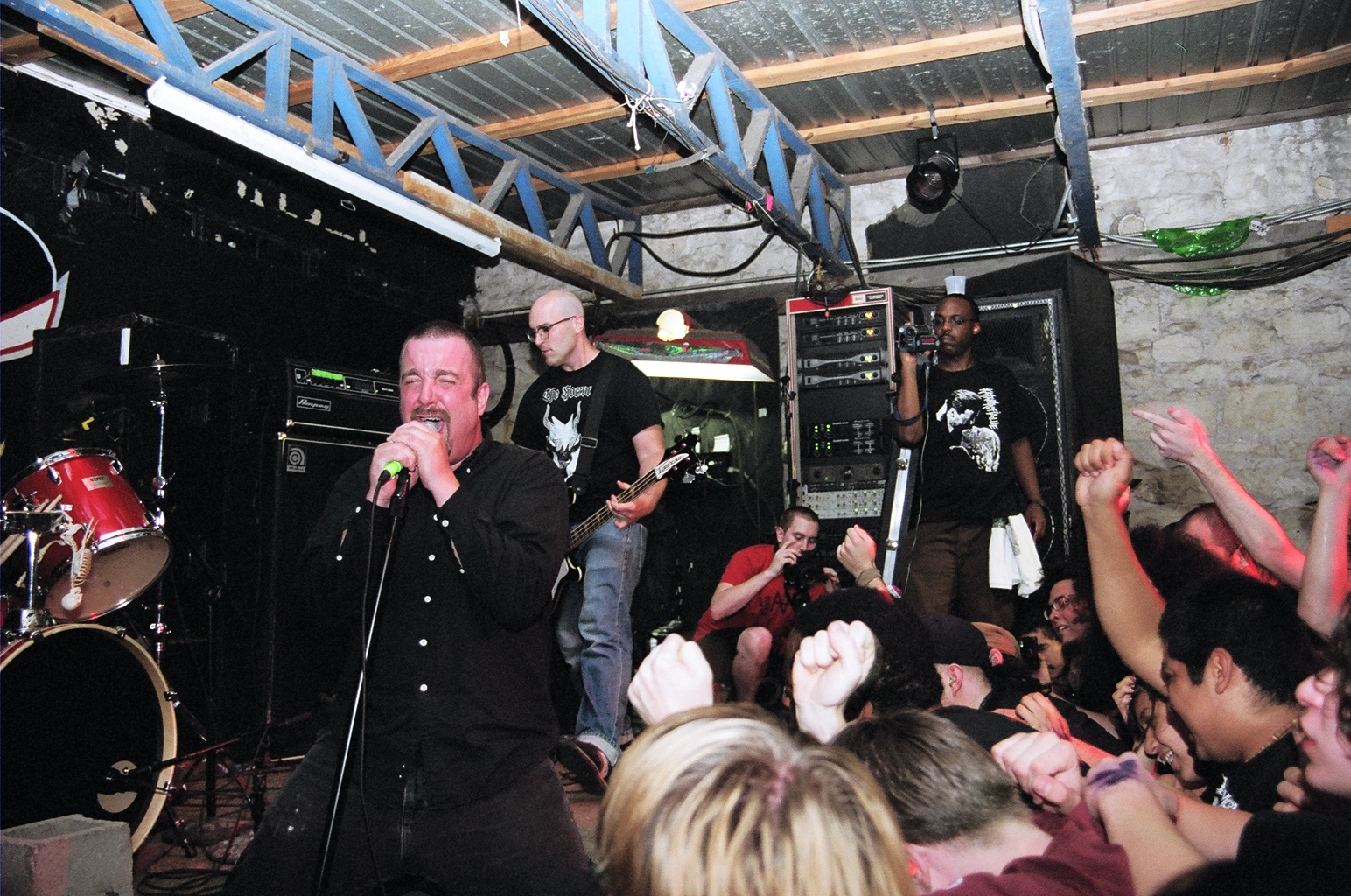
- Dropdead live in Austin, Texas on May 19, 2007

Background information
- Origin: Providence, Rhode Island, U.S.
- Genres: Hardcore punk; powerviolence
- Years active: 1991–present
- Labels: Armageddon; MCR; Prank; Selfless; Crust
- Members: Bob Otis; Ben Barnett; Brian Mastrobuono; George Radford
- Past members: Devon Cahill; Lee Mastrobuono

Dropdead is an American hardcore punk band based in Providence, Rhode Island. They have been active in the punk scene since 1991, having been formed in January of that year. The band's songs are generally short and very fast-paced, with few lasting longer than two minutes. Other famous crust punk and grindcore bands like Nasum have covered some of their songs. The band has a strong DIY ethic.

== History ==
Meeting in Providence in 1989, they started playing as Hellocaust. After reconfiguring the lineup, a name change, and a great increase in speed and intensity, Dropdead was officially formed in January 1991. The first show happened in April 1991 with Born Against and Rorschach.

Recorded with Kurt Ballou at GodCity Studio, their follow up to their 1998 Untitled album titled Dropdead 2020 was released on September 25, 2020.

== Influences ==
They have cited various acts where they have drawn musically from: Anti Cimex, Crass, Conflict, Confuse, Discharge, Gauze, Icons of Filth, Infest, Lärm, Merzbow, Mob 47, Pandemonium, S.O.B., Septic Death, Siege (whose 1984 demo tape Drop Dead is the origin of the band's name), SSD, and Swans.

== Members ==
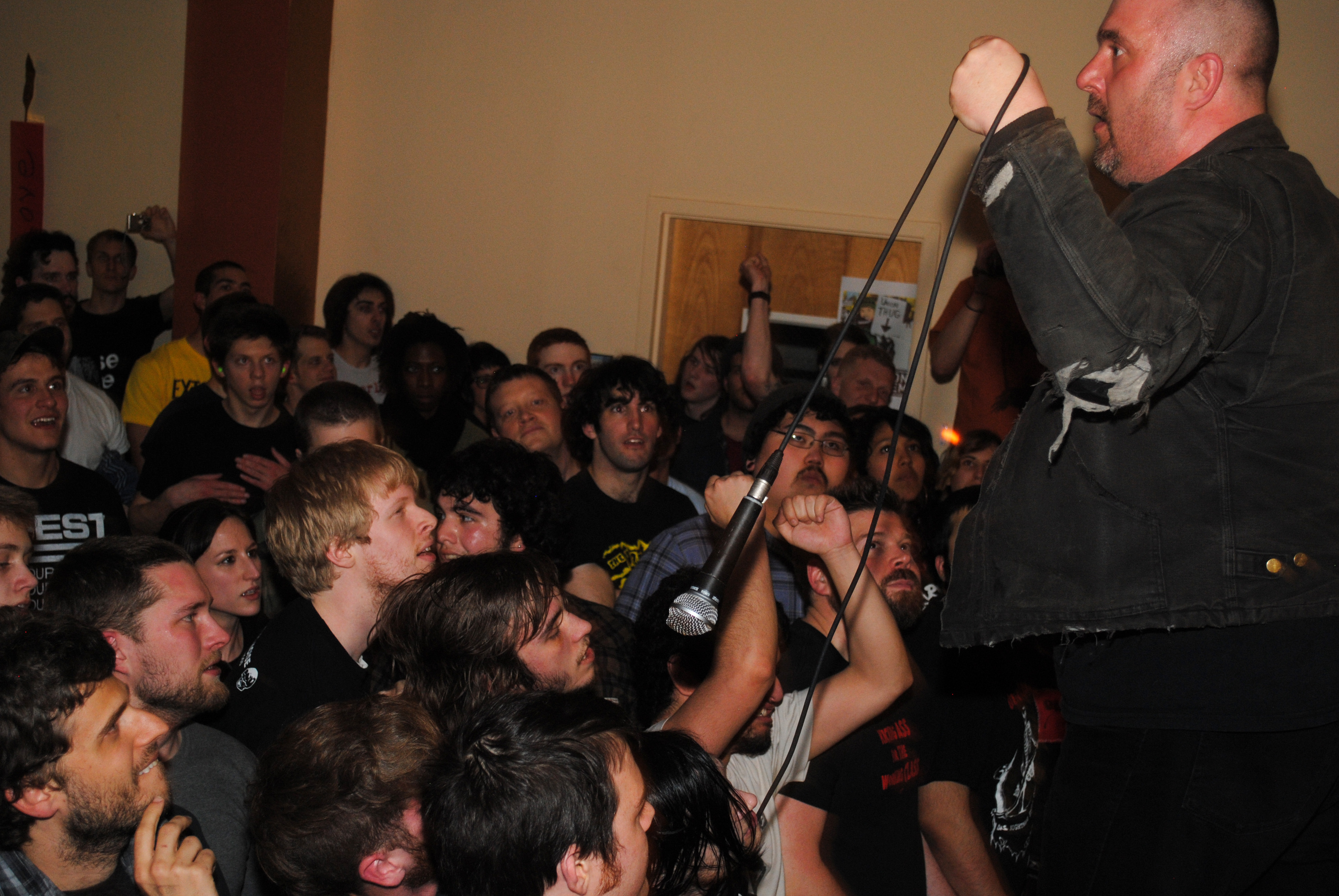
Live at St. Stephens, DC, 2011

Current

- Bob Otis – vocals (1991–present)
- Ben Barnett – guitar (1991–present)
- Brian Mastrobuono – drums (1991–present)
- George Radford – bass (2010–present)

Former

- Lee Mastrobuono – bass (1991–1996)
- Devon Cahill – bass (1996–2010)

== Discography ==
Studio albums

- Dropdead (1993, Selfless) (Sometimes referred to as 落とす死 or Dropdead 1993)
- Untitled (1998, Armageddon) (Sometimes referred to as LP 2 or Dropdead 1998)
- Dropdead 2020 (2020, Armageddon)

EPs

- Untitled 7" (1992, Crust Records)
- Hostile 7" (1996, Spiral Objective/Insurgence)
- Arms Race EP (2018, Armageddon)

Splits

- Dropdead/Swirlies (1991, Fast Forward)
- Dropdead/Rupture 8" (1992, Highly Collectable Records)
- Dropdead/Crossed Out 5" (1993, co-released by five labels)
- Dropdead/Totalitär 7" (2002, Prank)
- Dropdead/Unholy Grave 7" (2003, MCR)
- Dropdead/Look Back and Laugh 7" (2004, Armageddon)
- Converge/Dropdead 7" (2011, self-released)
- Dropdead/Ruidosa Inmundicia 7" (2013, Armageddon)
- Dropdead/Systematic Death – Fighting For Life 7" (2013, Armageddon)
- Dropdead/Brainoil 7" (2014, Armageddon)

Other

- Demo 1991 (1991, Armageddon, Fast Forward)
- What Could Be Single lathe 6" (2014, Armageddon; recorded live on BSR 88.1 FM on February 5, 2004)
- Demo 2019 (2019, Armageddon; benefit release for the Dropdead van fund)

Compilation albums

- Discography 1991–1993 (1994, Armageddon)

Live albums

- Untitled (1991, self-released; recorded live at 2nd show)
- Untitled (1991, self-released; recorded live on WRIU Radio 90.3 FM on May 22, 1991)
- Live at The Jame Room (1996, HG Fact Co. in Japan; recorded in Columbia, SC on August 10, 1993)
- Stack/Dropdead – Live In Udine 1996 (1997, self-released; recorded in Udine, Italy on October 2, 1996)
- Drop On – The Bootleg 3" (1997, Profane Existence Far East; recorded at Bad Lands, Hitoshima, Japan on May 14, 1996)
- Dropdead/Mrtvá Budoucnost/Primitiv Bunko - The Big Boss Originall Soundtrack (1998, Hogo Fogo Records; recorded live at 007 Club in Praha, Czech Republic on October 29, 1998)
- Live In Železniki (1998, Podpajsho Rekords; recorded in Železniki, Slovenia on November 1, 1998)
- Humanity Is Burying the Earth with Its Rotting Carcasses (1999, Ad Absurdum Records; recorded in Lahti, Finland on October 19, 1997)
- Live AJZ Wermelskirchen (2003, Red C Records, Armageddon; recorded in AJZ.Bahndamm Wermelskirchen, Germany in December 1998)

== Associated acts ==
Bob Otis

- Previously: The Fuzz, Lolita Black, Extinction Machine, NRK and I, Destroyer

Ben Barnett

- Runs Armageddon Label and Armageddon Record Shop
- Previously: Snake Apartment, Generica

Brian Mastrobuono

- Previously: Straight to Hell, Supperating Pustule, Battlesnake, Neon Bitches, and Ratstab
- Currently: Wolfhex

George Radford

- Currently: Edict, She Rides
- Previously: Intent to Injure, Fucking Invincible, and Sweet Jesus

Devon Cahill

- Previously: Monster X, Exploding Corpse Action, Conniption, and Hail Mary

== See also ==
- Animal rights and punk subculture
