= Slap-a-Ham Records =

- Founded: 1989
- Founder: Chris Dodge
- Genre: Hardcore punk, powerviolence, grindcore, thrash metal
- Country of origin: United States
- Location: San Francisco

Slap a Ham Records is an independent label from San Francisco owned and operated by Chris Dodge. The label originally lasted for about 13 years, officially shutting down in 2002. According to Dodge, this was due because of the September 11 attacks; "After the attacks, everyone stopped spending money" and as a result, Slap a Ham faced stagnant commerce, causing Dodge to go into debt.

In 2026, after more than 2 decades of inactivity, the label was relaunched to release the collaborative album Panra-Prismatic in Finite Blind by experimental powerviolence band Gasp and harsh noise/noisecore group Sissy Spacek.

== Discography ==
This list is organized by catalog number. All three Bllleeeeaaauuurrrrgghhh compilations were only released on 7" vinyl. All CD releases are bootlegs.

No.	Year	Artist	Title	Format	Notes
1	1990	Infest/P.H.C.	Split	8" Flexi	Edition of 1000 translucent blue 8" flexi disc copies, all hand numbered and packaged in fold-out sleeves. Later repressed as a 7" in 2000 with the catalog number 1.5
1.5	2000	Infest/P.H.C.	Split	7"	7" reissue of Slap a Ham #1. Edition of 1500 total, pressed on black and translucent blue vinyl. 6 test press copies also exist.
2	1990	Melvins	Your Blessened/Pronoun Piece Me	8" Flexi	2-song single, three pressings consisting of 1000 copies each, making 3000 copies total. The first pressing was 1000 clear copies that were packaged in white, yellow, or orange sleeves. The second pressing consisted of 1000 yellow copies packaged in blue sleeves. The third, and final, pressing was 1000 red copies packaged in red, green, or yellow sleeves. The first pressing sleeves featured a picture of Buzz Osborne as a kid, while the second and third featured a picture of a young Dale Crover instead. The first two pressings were also hand numbered, while the third was not.
3	1990	No Use for a Name	Let 'Em Out	7"	Pressed on yellow, red, grey, pink, purple, blue, and clear vinyl.
4	1990	Neanderthal	Fighting Music	7"	1300 copies total. The first pressing consisted of 1000 black copies that came with black and white inserts. The second press, consisting of only 100 purple copies, came with a red and white insert. The third pressing, consisting of 200 black copies, also came with a red and white insert.
4.5	2000	Neanderthal	Undisputed Fighting Music	7"	Extremely rare white label test pressing release, edition of only 6, making this the rarest release made the label. This release was originally planned to be a complete 8-song discography 7", but was never finished. Bootlegs released on 7" and cassette also exist, under the names of Complete Fighting Music.
5	1990	Stikky	Cuddle	7"	This 7" was originally released in Switzerland by Off The Disk Records in 1988. The US Slap a Ham edition was issued in 1990 and was first pressed on multi-colored splatter vinyl, and had some minor art alterations. A second pressing, issued in 1991, was pressed on yellow, grey/pink swirl, and also multi-colored splatter vinyl.
6	1990	Fu Manchu	Kept Between Trees	7"	1000 copies total. Test pressings (of unknown quantity) also exist. Would later be reissued by At The Dojo Records in 2015 as a 10".
7	1991	Various Artists	Bllleeeeaaauuurrrrgghhh! - The Record	7"	Compilation containing contribution by 41 bands total, all ranging stylistically from grindcore to punk rock. Pressed on blue, green, clear, pink, purple, grey, red, and white vinyl. Packaged in sleeves that ranged from green to blue to pink.
7.5	1991	Charred Remains/Pink Turds In Space	Split	7"	First pressing consisted of 1500 green copies in black-and-white sleeves. Second pressing consists of 500 black copies in red-and-white sleeves.
8	1991	Capitalist Casualties	The Art Of Ballistics	7"	Sleeve folds out as a poster
9	1991	Crossed Out	Crossed Out	7"	1000 black copies pressed. Also exists are 6 purple test pressings, at least one of which is signed by Chris Dodge
10	1992	Capitalist Casualties	Disassembly Line	LP, CD	Pressed on purple and black vinyl. CD edition contains material released on various compilation albums as well as the entirety of the band's The Art Of Ballistics 7", which was previously issued as Slap a Ham #8. Would later be reissued on LP and CD formats in 2002 by Six Weeks.
11	1992	No Comment	Downsided	7"	First press consists of 1500 clear copies packaged in fold-out poster sleeves. A second press of 1000 black copies followed. There are also less than 20 blue copies that were made, as well as an extra rare purple copy. Would later be repressed in 2011 by Deep Six Records.
12	1992	Various Artists	Son Of Bllleeeeaaauuurrrrgghhh	7"	A "sequel" to the Bllleeeeaaauuurrrrgghhh! compilation 7" (Slap a Ham #7) that was pressed on grey, blue, red, salmon, purple, and pink vinyl. Also exists are maroon copies that are packaged in xerox'd sleeves, as well as maroon copies packaged with no sleeves at all.
13	1992	Melvins	Love Canal/Someday	5"	2-song 5" single, edition of 3072. 3000 clear copies, 30 "milky" white copies, 30 pink copies, and 12 pink test pressings with white labels. All copies are packaged in clear blank plastic sleeves, and all copies (except for the test pressings) include no center labels.
14	1992	Crossed Out/Man Is the Bastard	Split	7"	First pressing consisted of 2000 black copies, 1000 packaged in blue sleeves, 1000 packaged in red sleeves. A second pressing was made, with alternative artwork that resembles closely to the band's "uniform" artwork style. The second press consists of pink, green, blue, and grey colored vinyl copies.
15	1992	Monastery/Anarchus	Mutilate The Corpse/In Partibus Infidelium	LP, CD, CS	Split full-length.
16	1993	Spazz	Spazz	7"	First pressing of 1000 black copies came in yellow sleeves, the second press consisted of 700 black copies in green sleeves.
17	1993	Lack Of Interest/Slave State	Split EP	7"	Some copies were packaged in alternative xerox'd sleeves
18	1993	Capitalist Casualties	Raised Ignorant	7"	Pressed on maroon vinyl. In 2015, Indonesian label Grind Today Records issued a cassette edition of the recording
19	1993	Rupture	Baser Apes	7"	Pressed on black and green vinyl
20	1994	Iabhorher	Crowskin/Splint	7"	2-song single.
21	1994	MDC/Capitalist Casualties	Liberty Gone	7"	3000 copies pressed in fold-out sleeves, released as a benefit for the Food Not Bombs organization.
22	1995	Man Is the Bastard	D.I.Y.C.D.	CD	Compilation album containing material by the band released on early 7" releases. Later repressed in 2006 by Deep Six.
23	1995	Spazz/C.F.D.L.	Split EP	7"	2000 copies total. An edition of 50 hand numbered copies were released at Fiesta Grande #3
24	1995	13/Eyehategod	Wrong/Southern Discomfort	7"	
25	1994	Plutocracy	Dankstahz	LP	Pressed as an edition of 500 black copies. Later issued as a 10" in Germany by the labels Anomie Records and Rødel Records.
26	1995	Despise You/Suppression	...To Show How Much You Meant/Mechanized Flesh	7"	
27	1995	Discordance Axis/Plutocracy	Split EP	7"	3000 copies pressed. Originally intended to be a split between Plitocracy and Assück, however the Assück side was never recorded.
28	1996	Enemy Soil	War Parade	7"	Pressed on pink, brown, and green vinyl
29	1997	Phobia	Enslaved	7"	Packaged in fold-out poster sleeve
30	1996	Noothgrush	Embraced By The Anti-Self	7"	
31	1996	Spazz/Jimmie Walker	Split	7"	600 copies total; 500 black, 100 clear
32	1996	Benumb/Dukes Of Hazzard	Split	7"	Pressed on red and black vinyl. The Dukes Of Hazzard side contains a recording of James Best singing a song about his pet dog
33	1997	Gob/Wink Martindale	Together At Last	7"	500 copies on black vinyl, 100 copies on gold vinyl
34	1997	Spazz	Funk Ass Lil' Platter	1"	Obscure 1" toy record with only 14 copies made. It is the second rarest release made by Slap a Ham.
35	1997	Capitalist Casualties	A Collection Of Out-Of-Print Singles, Split EP's And Compilation Tracks	CD	Compilation album featuring singles, split material, and compilation tracks. Later reissued by Six Weeks in 2000.
36	1997	Spazz	Sweatin' To The Oldies	CD	Compilation featuring singles, compilation tracks, and split material. Indonesian label Grind Today Records issued a limited edition cassette edition of the album in 2015. In 2016, Tankcrimes reissued the album on CD format.
37	1997	Capitalist Casualties	Dope And War	7"	Issued in fold-out sleeve
38	1997	Hellnation	At War With Emo	5"	Pressed on black, yellow, and black/yellow swirl vinyl.
39	1997	Melt-Banana	Eleventh	7"	Pressed on clear vinyl.
40	1997	Various Artists	Fiesta Comes Alive	LP, CD	Pressed on black and blue vinyl. A purple pressing, available only through direct mail order, also exists
41	1997	No Less	Boxed In	7"	Pressed on red and black vinyl.
42	1998	Various Artists	Bllleeeeaaauuurrrrgghhh! - A Music War	7"	Third part in the Bllleeeeaaauuurrrrgghh! series. Pressed on black and purple vinyl.
43	1998	Fuck on the Beach	Fastcore on the Beach	7"	Pressed on black and white vinyl
44	1998	Godstomper	Saturday Morning Power Violence	7"	
45	1998	Slight Slappers	The Very Best of Slight Slappers	2"	Edition of 666 copies
46	1998	Gasp	Drome Triler of Puzzle Zoo People	LP, CD	LP pressed on black and baby blue vinyl. The blue copies were mostly sold through direct mail order
47	1998	Phobia	Means of Existence	LP, CD	LP pressed on pink and black vinyl. Deep Six Records later reissued the album as a picture disc in 2008, and repressed it again in 2013 on black, blue, and green vinyl. In 2002, Deathvomit Records reissued the CD edition.
48	1998	Burned Up, Bled Dry	Cloned Slaves...For Slaves...	7"	Pressed on green and black vinyl.
49	1998	Burning Witch	Towers...	LP	Edition of 2000; 1800 black, 200 clear.
50	1999	Ancient Chinese Secret	Caveat Emptor	LP, CD	Pressed on black and orange vinyl. The same year, a cassette edition was issued by Selfmadegod Records and Impeachment Records
51	1999	Fuck on the Beach	Power Violence Forever	LP, CD	LP pressed on black and white vinyl. CD edition includes a live set as a single bonus track.
52	1999	Lack of Interest	Trapped Inside	LP, CD	LP pressed on black and orange vinyl.
53	1998	Various Artists	Ham Slappin' Hits	CS	Edition of 20 hand numbered copies that were given away to friends of the label as Christmas presents. It is the third rarest release by the label.
54	1999	Spazz	Crush, Kill, Destroy	LP, CD	CD edition of 3000 copies. LP pressed on black (2700 copies) and purple (300) vinyl. The purple copies were sold through direct mail order. 625 Thrashcore would later reissue the album in 2010 as an LP, then again in 2012, then again in 2013, then finally once more in 2015. In 2015, a cassette edition of the album was issued by Indonesian label Grind Today Records.
55	1999	Crossed Out	1990–1993	LP, CD	LP pressed on black and white vinyl, white copies being sold through direct mail order. Discography compilation containing every single released song by Crossed Out as well as demos and live recordings.
56	2000	Hellnation	Cheerleaders For Imperialism	LP, CD	LP pressed on black and pink vinyl.
57	2001	Fuck on the Beach	Endless Summer	LP, CD	LP pressed on black and yellow vinyl.
58	2000	East/West Blast Test	East/West Blast Test	CD	Later reissued in 2003 by Relapse Records.
59	2001	Various Artists	Short, Fast, And Loud! Vol. #1	CD	
60	2001	Spazz	Sweatin' 3: Skatin', Satan, & Katon	CD	
61	2002	Conga Fury	Chaotic Noise	CD	
62	2001	Yacøpsæ	Einstweilige Vernichtung	LP, CD	Issued in Germany by Vulgar Records and Scrotum Records the same year as the US Slap a Ham Release. In 2011, Italian labels F.O.A.D. Records and E.U. '91 Produzioni reissued the album as an LP. In 2015, the Malaysian label Sukma Records issued the album on cassette.
63	2001	Noothgrush	Failing Early, Failing Often	CD	Compilation that includes tracks from splits and compilations.
64	2002	Otophobia	Malignant	CD	Edition of 2000. Deep Six Records issued an LP edition the same year as the Slap a Ham CD.
66	2026	Gasp Sissy Spacek	Panra-Prismatic in Finite Blind	LP, CD	First release from Slap a Ham in 22 years.
