= Iron Lung (band) =

American powerviolence band

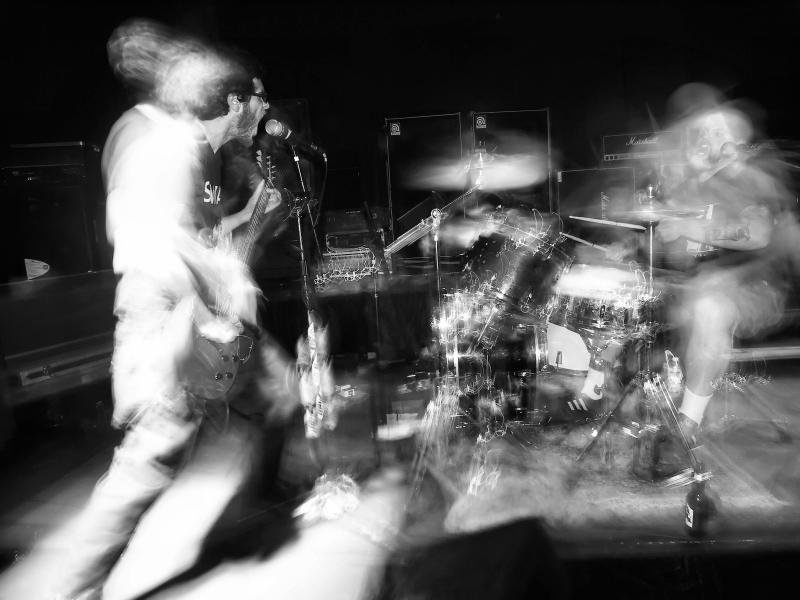
- Iron Lung, 2009 fan photo

Background information
- Origin: Reno, Nevada, US
- Genres: Powerviolence
- Years active: 1999–present
- Labels: Prank, 625 Thrashcore, Six Weeks, No Idea, Iron Lung
- Members: Jensen Ward; Jon Kortland

Iron Lung are an American musical duo based in Seattle, Washington, United States and featuring drummer Jensen Ward and guitarist Jon Kortland who both provide vocals. They self-describe their music as punk rock, hardcore punk or simply “Iron Lung Music”, but are often classified in the powerviolence subgenre.

The band formed in 1999 in Reno, Nevada, and is currently in Seattle, after spending some time in Oakland, California. Live, the band has toured extensively across the U.S., Asia, Australia and Europe. They have released music on several labels including Prank Records, 625 Thrashcore, and their own label, Iron Lung Records.

In recent years, the band has collaborated with other members of the hardcore punk and powerviolence scene, including Hatred Surge and Dave Bailey, formerly of Running for Cover. In 2009, an album titled Public Humiliation was released; a three-way collaboration between Iron Lung and Kortland and Ward's side projects, Pig Heart Transplant and Walls respectively. The recording is of a one-off live performance from Halloween 2008. Korland is also half of the art project Feeding, which has made artwork for several Iron Lung, Walls and PHT releases, as well as album covers for several other bands.

== Discography ==
=== Splits ===
- Split 7" w/ Teen Cthulhu
- Split 7" w/ Brainoil
- Split LP/CD w/ Lana Dagales
- Split 7" w/ BG
- Split 5" w/ Quattro Stagioni
- Split 7" w/ Scurvy Bastards
- Split LP/CD w/ Shank
- Split 7" w/ Lords of Light
- Split 7" w/ Agents of Abhorrence
- Split LP w/ Withdrawal Method (unreleased, test pressings only)
- Split 7" w/ The Process
- Split LP w/ The Endless Blockade
- Split 2x7" w/ Hatred Surge, Mind Eraser and Scapegoat – Brutal Supremacy (Painkiller Records)

=== EPs ===
- Demonstrations in Pressure and Volume 7"
- "Cancer" b/w "Life of Pain" (Black Flag cover)
- Saboteur 7"

=== Albums ===
- Life. Iron Lung. Death.
- Sexless//No Sex
- Live at Supersonic 2009
- White Glove Test
- Savagery
- Adapting//Crawling

=== Demos and tapes ===
- 10 Song 2000 demo
- Iron Lung Comedy Hour Live
- Enterruption Hermetic Archival Series 1
- Cold Storage I cassette/CD
- Cold Storage II cassette

=== Collaborations ===
- Iron Lung/Hatred Surge – Broken: A Collaboration 7"
- Walls/Pig Heart Transplant/Iron Lung – Public Humiliation LP
- Dead Language – Dead Language LP
