= Ché Café =

Worker co-operative at University of California, San Diego

Coordinates: 32.872926°N 117.239335°W

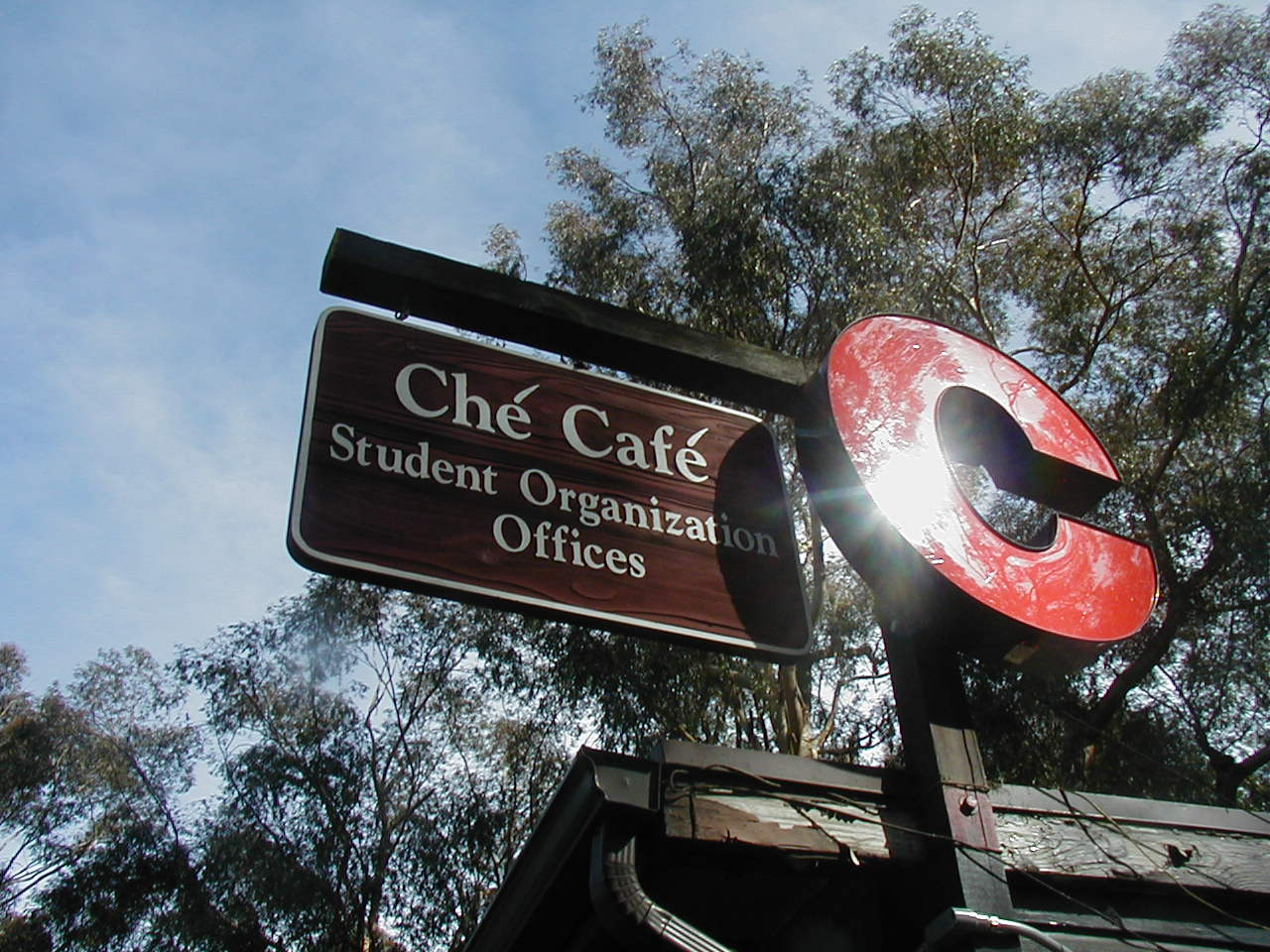
Ché Café sign

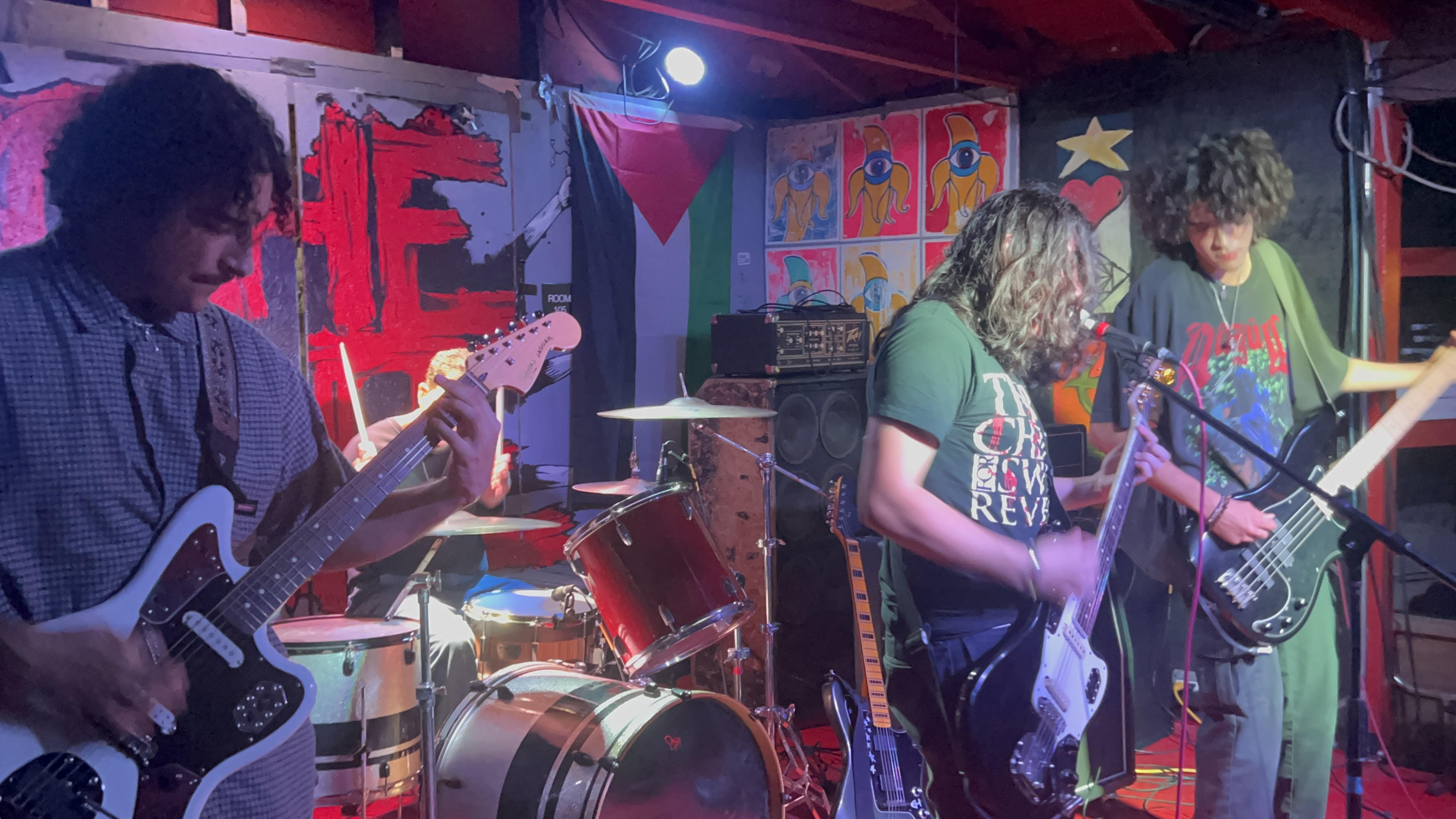
San Diego band Sledges performing at the Che Cafe, 2024

The Ché Café is a worker co-operative, social center, and live music venue located on the campus of the University of California, San Diego. Zack de la Rocha described the Ché Café as "A place that is not only a great venue, but a source of inspiration and community building for any artist, student, or worker that has entered its doors."

== History ==
Ché Café was founded in 1980 by several UCSD students, including Scott Kessler, Ruth Rominger, Kim Higgs, and Joy Every. The name is primarily a nod to the late Argentine revolutionary Che Guevara, but was registered as a backronym for "Cheap Healthy Eats" with the university administration in an attempt to avoid political scrutiny.

During the 1980s, collective members began to host reggae and punk rock shows, and in the 1990s, the space became an internationally recognized staple of the hardcore/punk/post-punk/indie rock scene. Today, the Ché operates primarily as a venue for a variety of musical genres, many based around the DIY ethic, and is an on-and-off again vegan cafe and catering operation. It also acts as a resource for the music and art departments on campus through hosting art shows, performances and film screenings.

The Ché Café is a volunteer based organization on the edge of the UCSD campus in La Jolla, California. Since the organization is a non profit and relies on volunteers, they have weekly meetings in the building. These meetings are for people to come join, and help discuss how to help and improve our community with the Ché Café. It is an all ages venue, which usually keeps their ticket prices affordable ($5-20) to make seeing a show at the Che more accessible.

=== UCSD administration clashes ===
Despite the university's initial support for the co-ops at UCSD, the relationship between the university and student co-ops has been in decline, with recent improvements made through mediation since 2003. The Ché Café in particular has for a long time had a very strained relationship with the university, and as with the other co-ops, there have been numerous attempts made by the university to close the space.

In the spring of 2000, UCSD attempted to close the space by changing the locks without members' consent, resulting in a lock-in by members and supporters. The UCSD administration cited as motivation a fight that occurred between two patrons at a show in which one was injured (though there has been much discrepancy as to what actually took place). Following the lock-in, the university tried to force the Ché to hire security guards for every show, but it was later ruled that the university did not have such authority under the 1993 memorandum of understanding between the co-ops and the university.

In 2002, the Ché agreed to sponsor the BURN! collective's web project, which was previously sponsored by the co-op bookstore Groundwork Books. BURN! was a directory of radical websites, mailing lists, and resources. The BURN! directory included links to the web pages of two entities designated by the United States Department of State as foreign terrorist organizations: the Marxist-Leninist Revolutionary Armed Forces of Colombia (FARC) and the Kurdish nationalist Kurdistan Workers' Party. The conservative student publication The California Review subsequently revealed the presence on the server of the Túpac Amaru Revolutionary Movement, which was similarly labeled as a terror group by the State Department. In 2004, the UCSD administration received a complaint about the link, accused the Ché Café core members of providing "material support" to the FARC in violation of the USA Patriot Act, and threatened disciplinary action.

On October 21, 2014, the San Diego County Superior Court ruled in favor of UCSD's filing of eviction against the cafe. Ché Café was issued a notice it had to leave the premises within five days. The reasoning for the eviction claimed by the university related to unsubstantiated safety issues. Following this decision UCSD served the venue with an eviction notice on March 17, 2015. The Ché Café was under 24/7 student-led occupation after this date, defying the court order. In July 2015, supporters of the Ché Café met with UCSD Chancellor Pradeep Khosla, and following this, the university announced a 45-day stay of eviction and agreed to fund a professional inspection of the building to assess any necessary repairs and maintenance.

They later signed a new lease agreement following renovations in 2017. It would not be until 2018 that the Cafe would finish its renovation and reopen as a venue.
