= Capitalist Casualties =

American hardcore band

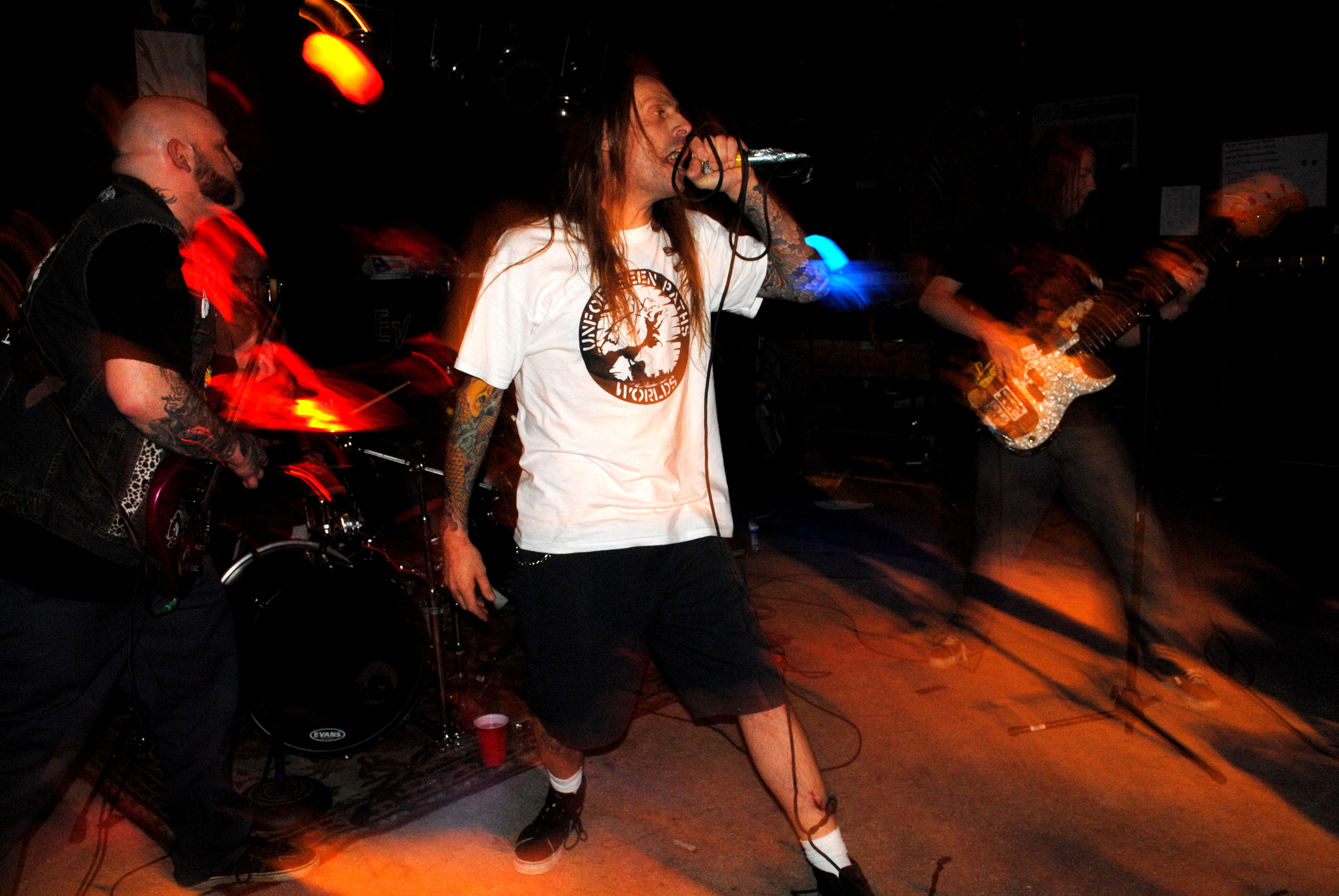
- Capitalist Casualties performing in 2010

Background information
- Origin: Santa Rosa, California, U.S.
- Genres: Powerviolence, hardcore punk, crust punk
- Years active: 1987–2018
- Labels: Slap-A-Ham, Revolver, Six Weeks
- Past members: Shawn Elliott; Jeff Robinson; "Spider Mike" Vinatieri; Matt Martin; "Hirax Max" Ward; "H Murder" Haroldo Mardones

Capitalist Casualties were an American powerviolence / hardcore band. They formed in Rohnert Park, California around 1986 and had their first concert in 1987 in Santa Rosa, California. They have released multiple records, including many splits with other powerviolence / hardcore bands, and have toured nationally and internationally.

== Members ==
- Shawn Elliott – vocals (1987–2018); died 2018
- Jeff Robinson – bass guitar, vocals (1987–2018)
- Matt Martin (1987–1995/1996) – drums
- "Spider Mike" Vinatieri – guitar (1987–2018); died 2021
- "Hirax Max" Ward – drums (1996–2004?)
- "H Murder" Haroldo Mardones – drums (2004–2018)
- Arthur Bowen – guitar (1986–1989); died 2024

== Discography ==
=== Albums and EPs ===
- The Art of Ballistics (Slap-A-Ham, EP, 1991)
- Disassembly Line (Slap-A-Ham, LP, 1992)
- Raised Ignorant (Slap-A-Ham, EP, 1993)
- Raised Ignorant Re-issue (Grindtoday Records, Cassette, 2015)
- Live Butchery (Vibrator, EP, 1994)
- A Collection of Out-of-Print Singles, Split EPs and Compilation Tracks (Slap-A-Ham, CD, 1997)
- Dope and War (Slap-A-Ham, EP, 1997)
- Dark Circle (Conspiracy Evolve, EP, 1999)
- Subdivisions in Ruin (Six Weeks, LP, 1999)
- Planned Community (Six Weeks, EP, 2000)
- 1996-1999: Years in Ruin (Six Weeks, CD, 2004)
- 1996-1999: Years in Ruin (Grindtoday Records, Cassette Tape, 2015)

=== Splits ===
- Split Personality with The Dread (Six Weeks, EP, 1993)
- split with Discordance Axis (Pulp, EP, 1994)
- Liberty Gone with Millions of Dead Cops (Slap-A-Ham, EP, 1994)
- split with Man Is the Bastard (Six Weeks, LP, 1994)
- split with Slight Slappers (Sound Pollution, MCR, EP, 1995)
- split with Ulcer (Six Weeks, EP, 1995)
- Fear Persuasion Violence Obedience split 10" with Cripple Bastards, Masskontroll and Warpath (Wiggy, EP, 1995)
- split with Stack (Six Weeks, EP, 1996)
- split with Monster X (Hater of God, EP, 2000)
- split with Unholy Grave (Deaf American, EP, 2000)
- split with Macabre (D.B.D., EP, 2001)
- split with Hellnation (Sound Pollution/Six Weeks, LP/CD, 2008)
- split with Lack of Interest (Six Weeks, EP, 2010)
- A Painful Split with NoComply (To Live a Lie, EP, 2011)
