= Max Ward (drummer) =

American musician

- Also known as: Hirax Max
- Genres: Thrashcore, power violence
- Occupation: Musician
- Instruments: Drums, vocals
- Label: 625 Thrashcore
- Formerly of: Spazz, Plutocracy, Capitalist Casualties, What Happens Next?, Bombs of Death, and Scholastic Deth

Max Ward, occasionally playing under the moniker of Hirax Max, is an American power violence and thrashcore drummer and vocalist, playing for such bands as Spazz, Plutocracy, Capitalist Casualties, What Happens Next?, Bombs of Death, and Scholastic Deth. He is also known for his extreme support of the D.I.Y. scene, having released records and booked tours for hundreds of local, national, and international bands, while still living in the San Francisco Bay Area. He is the founder of 625 Thrashcore records.

== Career ==
Early in his musical career, drummer Max Ward was part of bands including Grok, a "supergroup" in Hamilton, New Zealand, and an acoustic group called Beat Angels. He played in multiple bands with Chris Fish.

== 625 Thrashcore ==
625 Thrashcore is an American record label started by Ward in 1993. They put out records of different genres, including hardcore, grindcore, thrashcore, powerviolence and others, mainly from the US and Japan.

Artists include:

- Charles Bronson
- Exhumed
- Iron Lung
- R.A.M.B.O.
- Spazz
- What Happens Next?
- Insect Warfare
