= Spazz (band) =

American powerviolence band

- Origin: Redwood City, California
- Genres: Powerviolence
- Years active: 1992–2000
- Labels: Slap-a-Ham, 625 Thrashcore, Tankcrimes
- Past members: Chris Dodge; Max Ward; Dan Bolleri "Lactose"

Spazz was an American powerviolence band active between 1992 and 2000. The trio released numerous records within this time, many of which are now highly collectible due to their relative rarity. The band's releases often showcased their unusual sense of humour: absurdly long and nonsensical song titles, audio samples from B movies and kung fu films between songs and the occasional use of hip hop beats as well as saxophones, banjos and other instruments rarely associated with hardcore punk. All three of the members shared vocal duties, usually changing in sequence from line to line. The group would typically play at all ages venues. 2015 saw the release of a tribute LP to Spazz by Scottish record label Mind Ripper Collective titled "Spazzin' To The Oldies - A Tribute To Spazz". In 2016, it was announced that Tankcrimes will reissue the out-of-print Spazz albums Sweatin' To The Oldies and Sweatin' 3: Skatin', Satan & Katon.

== After Spazz ==
Spazz vocalist and bassist Chris Dodge's record label, Slap-a-Ham Records, was a fixture during the rapid rise and decline of powerviolence in the late '80s and early '90s, releasing influential records by the likes of Man Is the Bastard, No Comment, Crossed Out, Infest and Spazz, amongst others.

The label's Fiesta Grande was an annual power violence festival held at 924 Gilman Street during its heyday, from 1992 to the band's demise in 2000. Since then, he has been involved in several musical projects, most notably East West Blast Test with highly regarded extreme metal drummer Dave Witte, formerly of Discordance Axis, Melt-Banana and many others. In recent years, he has performed with bands like Despise You, Lack Of Interest, Infest, and To The Point.

Spazz vocalist and drummer Max Ward's label, 625 Thrashcore, has started their own festival, 'Super Sabado Gigante', in a similar vein. Spazz vocalist and guitarist Dan Bolleri makes hip hop music under the alias DJ Eons One.

== Discography ==
Studio albums

- Dwarf Jester Rising (1994, Clearview)
- La Revancha (1997, Sound Pollution)
- Crush Kill Destroy (1999, Slap-a-Ham)

Extended plays

- Blasted In Bangkok demo tape (1993, Self-released)
- Spazz 7-inch (1993, Slap-a-Ham)
- Funky Ass Lil' Platter 1-inch (1996, Slap-a-Ham) (Unplayable toy 1-inch with no actual music)
- Tastin' Spoon 5-inch (1997, Clean Plate)
- The Jeb 7-inch (2002, Jeb Records)

Split records

- Spazz/Floor 7-inch (1994, Bovine)
- Spazz/Brutal Truth 7-inch (1995, Bovine/Rhetoric)
- Bible Studies split CD with Subversion (1995, Deported)
- Spazz/Romantic Gorilla (1996, Sound Pollution)
- Spazz/Toast 7-inch (1996, HG Fact)
- Spazz/Jimmie Walker 7-inch (1996, Slap-a-Ham)
- The Network Of Friends Project Part 1 split 7-inch with Öpstand (1997, Coalition)
- Spazz/Black Army Jacket 7-inch (1997, Dogprint)
- Spazz/Slobber 7-inch (1997, Sacapuntas)
- Spazz/Monster X 7-inch (1997, Reservoir)
- Raging Violence split 7-inch with Hirax (1997, Theologian/Pessimiser)
- Skinny Top, Heavy Bottom split 5-inch with Gob (1997, 702/Satans Pimp)
- Double Whammy split 7-inch with Lack Of Interest (1997, Deep Six)
- Spazz/25 Ta Life 7-inch (1999, Edison Recordings)

Compilation albums

- Sweatin' To The Oldies (1997, Slap-a-Ham)
- Sweatin' 2: Deported Live Gorilla (2001, 625 Thrashcore)
- Sweatin' 3: Skatin', Satan & Katon (2001, Slap-a-Ham)

Compilation appearances

- Cry Now, Cry Later Vol. 1 – "Loach" (1993, Theologian/Pessimiser)
- El Guapo – "Enterslavement", "Hardboiled", and "Burning Tongue" (1994, 625 Thrashcore)
- Audio Terrorism – "Gas Pump", "MPS", "Running Man", and "Slow Death" (1994, Chaotic Noise Productions)
- Antisocial People Underground Compilation #1 – "No Thought" (1995)
- Pigs Suck – "In The Name Of.../Might For Right" (1995, Clean Plate)
- Kamakazi Attacked America/America Bombed Hiroshima, Nagasaki – "DJ Tinkle Fingers/Diplomatic Services" (1995, MCR/Sound Pollution)
- Left Back/Let Down – "Spudboy", "Smoking Don's Crack Hole", "Dirt The Purity", "Knuckle Scraper", and "Box II (Yates Goes To Africa)" (1995, Theologian/Pessimiser)
- Reality – "Gnome Servant" (1996, Deep Six)
- Better Read Than Dead (A Benefit For AK Press) – "Mighty Morphin Power Violence" (1996, Epitaph)
- Cry Now, Cry Later Vol. 4 – "White Glove Test" (1996, Theologrian/Pessimiser)
- Tomorrow Will Be Worse – "Sanrio Soldier", "Connie The Mack", "Plastic Grandma Cackling At The Frozen Lemonade Fishbowl, Baby", "Bastard Tomb Ride", and "Beattie And The Beat" (1997, Sound Pollution)
- Gummo – "Gummo Love Theme" (1997, London)
- Fiesta Comes Alive! – "Might For Right" (1997, Slap-a-Ham)
- Reality Part 2 – "Animal Liberation Now" (1997, Deep Six)
- Possessed To Skate – "Billy Pepper's Fist In The Glass Eye Of Jake Phelps", "Sir War Alot", "Skatin' And Satan Go Hand In Hoof", "Town Center", "Crazy Eddie", "B-Street Butta" (1997, 625 Thrashcore/Theologian/Pessimiser)
- A Product Of Six Cents – "Danliftingbanner (Live)" (1997, A Product Of Six Cents)
- Audio Terrorism: The Soundtrack For Weirdness And Blind Hostility – "Caught In The Net" (1998, Chaotic Noise Production/Satans Pimp/Heartplug Records)
- Reproach: 8 Modern Hardcore Bands Cover Negative Approach – "Lost Cause" (1998, Ugly Pop)
- Ham Slappin' Hits! – "Gertie", "Hardboiled", "4 Times A Day" (1998, Slap-a-Ham)
- The Good, The Bad And The Ugly – "7 Deadly Finns" (1998, Insolito)
- Short Music For Short People – "A Prayer For The Complete And Utter Eradication Of All Generic Pop-Punk" (1999, Fat Wreck Chords)
- Question Of Tolerance? – "Let's Fucking Go" (2002, Front Rock)
- Necrotardation – "Raise Your Sword To The Dark Lord" (2002, Deplorable/Ghostmeat)
- You Call This Music?! Vol. 2 – "Typical Hardcore Song #1" (2002, Geykido Comet)
- Bay Area Checking In With The World – "Crocket" (2007, Coldfront)
- A Product Of Sex Cents 2 – "Jeb Song (Live At Last Show)" (2009, A Product Of Six Cents)
