= Powerviolence =

Music genre; subgenre of hardcore punk

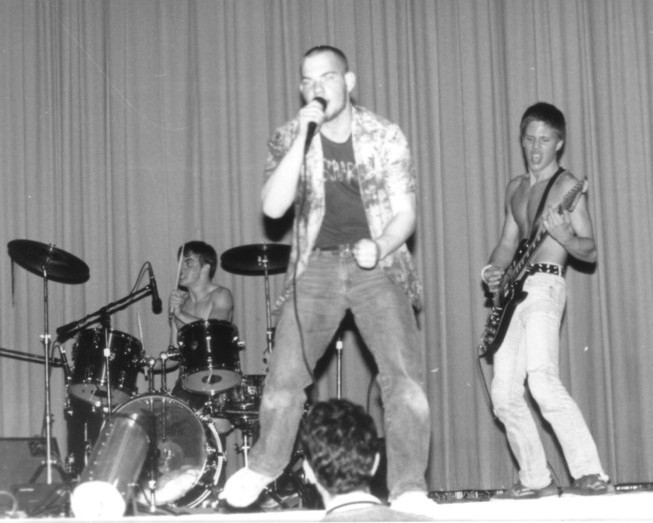
- Powerviolence pioneers Siege performing at their high school in 1984
- Stylistic origins: Thrashcore; noise; hardcore punk
- Cultural origins: Late 1980s, United States
- Typical instruments: Vocals; bass; guitar; drums
- Derivative forms: Bandana thrash

Subgenres
- Powernoise

Fusion genres
- Emoviolence

Other topics
- Crossover thrash; grindcore; crust punk; noise rock; screamo

Powerviolence (sometimes written as power violence) is a chaotic and fast subgenre of hardcore punk which is closely related to thrashcore and grindcore. In contrast with grindcore, which is a "crossover" idiom containing musical aspects of heavy metal, powerviolence is just an augmentation of the most challenging qualities of hardcore punk and grindcore. Like its predecessors, it is usually socio-politically charged and iconoclastic.

== Characteristics ==
While powerviolence is closely related to thrashcore (often referred to simply as "thrash"), it is markedly different from thrash metal in both sound and approach. Powerviolence groups tend to be very raw and under-produced. This is true of both their sound and packaging. Some groups (e.g. Man Is the Bastard and Dystopia) took influence from anarcho-punk and crust punk, emphasizing animal rights and anti-militarism. Groups such as Despise You and Lack of Interest wrote lyrics about misanthropy, drugs, and inner-city issues. Groups such as Spazz and Charles Bronson, on the other hand, wrote lyrics mocking points of interest for hardcore and metal fans. Their lyrics often consisted of inside jokes that referenced specific people, many of whom were unfamiliar to those outside the band.

Other groups associated with powerviolence included The Locust, Dropdead, Black Army Jacket, Hellnation, Powercup, Sordo, Chulo and Rorschach. The doom metal group Burning Witch (who released music on the Slap-A-Ham label) often played shows with powerviolence groups.

== Etymology ==
While the term powerviolence originally included a number of stylistically diverse bands, it typically refers to bands who focus on speed, brevity, breakdowns, and constant tempo changes. Powerviolence songs are often very short, with some lasting less than twenty seconds. Groups such as Man Is the Bastard, Plutocracy, Azucares, and No Le$$ took influence from progressive rock and jazz fusion.

== History ==
Siege are considered the pioneers of powerviolence. Additionally, Infest have received credit for having an early impact on the genre. The microgenre solidified into its commonly recognized form in the early 1990s. This is best exemplified by bands such as Man Is the Bastard, Stikky, Crossed Out, Neanderthal, No Comment and Capitalist Casualties. Powerviolence groups took inspiration from Siege, Hüsker Dü, SSD, Deep Wound, Neon Christ, Hirax, Impact Unit, Dirty Rotten Imbeciles, Negative FX and Corrosion of Conformity.

Spazz vocalist and bassist Chris Dodge's record label Slap-a-Ham Records was a fixture during the rapid rise and decline of powerviolence, releasing influential records by Neanderthal, No Comment, Crossed Out, Infest, Slight Slappers, and Spazz. The label's Fiesta Grande was an annual powerviolence festival held at 924 Gilman from 1993 to 2000. The label 625 Thrashcore (founded by Spazz drummer Max Ward) started a similarly themed festival in 2003, called Super Sabado Gigante.

== Legacy and influence ==
Powerviolence groups had a strong influence on later grindcore acts, such as Agoraphobic Nosebleed. Mark McCoy of Charles Bronson went on to form Das Oath, a popular thrashcore group. Members of Man Is the Bastard formed Bastard Noise.

A handful of bands from the powerviolence scene of the 1990s have continued to record and perform decades later, including Bastard Noise, Capitalist Casualties, Despise You, Lack of Interest, Infest, Slight Slappers, Stapled Shut, etc. Weekend Nachos, Nails, Magrudergrind, early Ceremony, Hatred Surge, Mind Eraser and Full of Hell are considered contemporary powerviolence acts. When Eric Wood from Man Is The Bastard was asked in 2021 about the new Powerviolence bands he answered:

I'm not at all interested in something that doesn't exist any longer. Power Violence took its last breath the day Shawn Elliott of Capitalist Casualties passed away, period. These silly fuckers who will remain nameless that "claim" Power Violence need to look in the mirror and start their own sub-genre...

=== Emoviolence ===
Emoviolence is a fusion genre that combines elements of powerviolence and screamo. Common characteristics shared by emoviolence bands include screamed vocals, blast beats, extensive use of amplifier feedback, and small elements of melody. The term "emoviolence" was jokingly created by the band In/Humanity, and bands commonly associated with the term include Orchid, Usurp Synapse, Jeromes Dream, and Pg. 99.
