= Infest (band) =

American hardcore punk band

- Origin: Valencia, California, U.S.
- Genre: Powerviolence
- Years active: 1986–1996, 2013–present
- Label: Slap-a-Ham Records
- Members: Joe Denunzio (vocals); Matt Domino (guitar); Spencer Pollard (bass); Jorge Herrera (drums)
- Past members: Dave Ring (bass); Chris Clift (drums); RD Davies (drums); Chris Dodge (bass); Bob Deepsix (drums)

Infest is an American powerviolence band, formed in September 1986 by Joe Denunzio, Matt Domino, Dave Ring and Chris Clift. The band's album covers contained imagery of a political nature, depicting the reality of war and poverty. The group broke up in 1996, having played only a handful of shows outside California.

== Discography ==
- Infest (demo, 1987)
- Infest (EP, Drawblank, 1988)
- Slave (LP, Off the Disk, 1988)
- Split 8" with Pissed Happy Children (Slap-a-Ham, 1989)
- Mankind (7", Drawblank, 1991)
- KXLU Radioshow (12", Deepsix, 2001)
- No Man's Slave (LP, Deepsix, 2002)
- Days Turn Black (7", Drawblank, 2013)
