= 2012 in American music =

The following is a list of notable events and releases that happened in 2012 in music in the United States.

== Notable events ==
=== January ===
- 7 – Katy Perry's single "The One That Got Away" reaches #1 on the Hot Dance Club Songs chart, making her album, Teenage Dream, the first album in history to have seven songs from the same album reach #1 on the Billboard Hot Dance Club Songs chart. It is also only the third album in history to have six singles from the same album reach the top five on the Billboard Hot 100.
- 20 – Etta James dies of leukemia at age 73.

=== February ===
- 4 – Adele's single "Set Fire to the Rain" reaches #1 on the Billboard Hot 100 chart, making her album, 21, the first album in history to have three #1 songs from the same album by a British female artist.
- 5 – During Super Bowl XLVI Kelly Clarkson performed the National Anthem, and Madonna performed during the halftime show. The twelve-minute performance becomes the most watched television event of all time, gathering a record 118 million viewers, six more than the game itself. Subsequently, "Give Me All Your Luvin'" becomes Madonna's 38th top ten hit and her 41st #1 hit on the dance charts.
- 11 – Music icon Whitney Houston is found dead at the age of 48 in her Los Angeles hotel room hours before a pre-Grammy party hosted by Clive Davis. Further investigations reveal cocaine in her system, but the cause of death is ruled as heart disease and drowning. Sales of her albums spike, and "I Will Always Love You" re-enters the top ten of the Billboard Hot 100.
- 12 – The 54th Annual Grammy Awards took place at the Staples Center in Los Angeles. Adele won six awards for her album 21, including Album of the Year, Song of the Year, and Record of the Year (the latter two for "Rolling in the Deep"). Bon Iver wins Best New Artist. Kanye West and the Foo Fighters swept in their respective categories, with Kanye winning 4 Grammys and the Foo Fighters taking 5.
- 28 – Terrorizer released their first studio album in six years, Hordes of Zombies.
- 28 – Corrosion of Conformity released their first studio album in seven years, Corrosion of Conformity.
- 29 – Davy Jones of the band The Monkees dies in Florida after suffering a severe heart attack at the age of 66.

=== March ===
- 3 – Adele becomes the first female artist to have three singles in the top ten of the Billboard Hot 100 at the same time, and the first female artist to have two albums in the top five of the Billboard 200 and two singles in the top five of the Billboard Hot 100 simultaneously.
  - Katy Perry's single "Part of Me" debuts at #1 on the Billboard Hot 100, becoming only the 20th song in history to debut atop the chart. It is her seventh consecutive top five single on the chart.
- 26 – Madonna released her twelfth studio album MDNA, which becomes her eighth #1 album on the Billboard 200, debuting with 359,000 copies sold in the second week.
- 26 – Joan Osborne released her first studio album in four years, Bring It on Home.

=== April ===
- 1 – The Academy of Country Music Awards took place in Las Vegas. This was the last year Reba McEntire hosted until 2018.
- 4 – Justin Bieber's single, "Boyfriend", has the second-highest first week sales of a new single, debuting at #2 on the Billboard Hot 100, later on surpassed by Taylor Swift's "We Are Never Ever Getting Back Together" with 623,000 sales making Bieber the third highest first week sale.
- 10 – Counting Crows released their first album in four years, Underwater Sunshine (or What We Did on Our Summer Vacation).
- 26 – Chiodos' original lead singer, Craig Owens, rejoins the band after being let go in September 2009, replacing Brandon Bolmer, who departed Chiodos in March. Drummer Derrick Frost also rejoins the band, replacing Tanner Wayne, who left with Bolmer in March.
- 28 – Gotye became the first Belgian-Australian solo artist to hit #1 on the Billboard Hot 100 with "Somebody That I Used To Know".
- 29 – Kevin Richardson rejoined the Backstreet Boys permanently, after roughly six years of departure.

=== May ===
- 1 – Pennywise releases All or Nothing, their only album to feature Ignite singer Zoli Téglás on lead vocals, following the August 2009 departure of original lead singer Jim Lindberg.
- 4 – Rapper Adam "MCA" Yauch of the Beastie Boys dies of cancer at the age of 47.
- 8 – Jermaine Paul wins the second season of The Voice. Juliet Simms is named runner-up. Tony Lucca and Chris Mann finishing third and fourth place respectively.
- 15 – Garbage released their first studio album in seven years, Not Your Kind of People.
  - Tenacious D released her first studio album in six years, Rize of the Fenix.
- 17 – Donna Summer, known as "The Queen of Disco", dies of cancer at age 63.
- 20 – The Billboard Music Awards took place at the MGM Grand Garden Arena in Las Vegas.
- 23 – Phillip Phillips is crowned winner of the eleventh season of American Idol while Jessica Sanchez is named runner-up.
- 29 – Doc Watson dies after complications from abdominal surgery at age 89.

=== August ===
- 1 – No Use for a Name frontman Tony Sly dies at the age of 41 of a drug overdose.
- 2 – Blink-182 celebrate their 20th anniversary as a band with a worldwide tour simply called 20th Anniversary Tour.
- 4 – Ministry reunited at the Wacken Open Air festival in Germany.
- 7 – Sixpence None the Richer released her first studio album in four years, Lost in Transition.
- 9 – The Monkees announce that Michael Nesmith rejoined the band for a twelve city tour of the U.S..
- 12 – Katy Perry's "Wide Awake" peaks at No. 2, becoming her ninth and final Top 10 single from the Teenage Dream era.
- 28 – TobyMac debuted at No. 1 on the Billboard 200 with his sixth full-length studio album Eye on It. The album was the first Christian release since 1997 to reach No. 1 on the Billboard 200.

=== September ===
- 4 – Matchbox Twenty released their first studio album in ten years, North.
- 6 – The MTV Video Music Awards took place at the Staples Center in Los Angeles.
- 11 – DMX released his first studio album in six years, Undisputed.
- 21 – Billie Joe Armstrong of Green Day has a meltdown at the iHeartRadio Festival when the tour promoters cut their performance short to extend time for Usher's performance. During their performance of Basket Case, he decides to stop the song and goes on a profanity-filled rant, even going as to say that he's "not Justin Bieber". Billie then smashes his guitar alongside Mike Dirnt, flips off the officials and throws the microphone. He enters rehab the next day.
- 25 – No Doubt released their first studio album in eleven years, Push and Shove.

=== October ===
- 16 – Death Cab for Cutie frontman Ben Gibbard released his solo debut, Former Lives.
- 22 – Taylor Swift released her anticipated album, Red. The album sold 1,208,000 copies in its first week in the U.S., debuting at number one on the Billboard 200 chart, the second highest debut for a female artist.
- 30 – The Coup released their first studio album in six years, Sorry to Bother You.

=== November ===
- 1 – The CMA Awards took place at the Bridgestone Arena in Nashville, Tennessee. Brad Paisley and Carrie Underwood hosted for the fifth year in a row.

=== December ===
- 18 – Cassadee Pope wins the third season of The Voice. Terry McDermott is named runner-up. Nicholas David finishing third place.
- 19 – Lostprophets frontman Ian Watkins was charged with multiple sexual offences against minors, infants and animals. In December 2013, he was sentenced to 29 years of imprisonment plus six years of extended supervision on licence.

== Bands formed ==
- 3rdeyegirl
- Body/Head
- The Chainsmokers
- Chelsea Light Moving
- Dan + Shay
- Device
- Emblem3
- Fifth Harmony
- Flying Colors
- Greta Van Fleet
- MisterWives
- On An On
- Perfect Pussy
- PVRIS
- Skaters
- Them Are Us Too
- The Winery Dogs
- X Ambassadors

== Bands reformed ==
- 98 Degrees
- The Afghan Whigs
- At the Drive-In
- The Beach Boys (classic lineup)
- Black Tambourine (single performance)
- Cannibal Ox
- Coal Chamber
- Dark New Day
- Desaparecidos
- Die Kreuzen
- Firehose (tour only)
- Garbage
- Grandaddy
- Jonas Brothers
- Matchbook Romance
- Matchbox Twenty
- The Monkees
- No Doubt
- The Obsessed
- Phantom Planet (five shows only)
- The Procussions
- The Replacements
- Van Halen

== Bands on hiatus ==
- The Black Eyed Peas
- Every Avenue
- Foo Fighters
- Incubus
- LMFAO
- Ludo
- Oceano
- Rage Against the Machine
- Scissor Sisters
- She Wants Revenge
- Staind
- Thrice
- Thursday

== Bands disbanded ==
- Beastie Boys
- Behind Crimson Eyes
- The Books
- Buffalo Springfield
- The Carrier
- Creed
- Das Racist
- David Crowder Band
- Defiance
- Diddy-Dirty Money
- D.R.U.G.S.
- The Dubliners
- Girls
- Handsome Furs
- Hole
- INXS
- It Dies Today
- Jack's Mannequin
- Jet
- Made Out of Babies
- Matchbook Romance
- MC5
- Meg & Dia
- Morningwood
- Pretty Ricky
- Radio 4
- Revis
- Rock Bottom Remainders
- Selena Gomez & the Scene
- Seven Mary Three
- Sherwood
- Sons and Daughters
- A Static Lullaby
- This Time Next Year
- Vains of Jenna
- Ween
- Women
- WU LYF

== Albums released in 2012 ==
List of 2012 albums

=== January ===
Date	Album	Artist	Genre(s)
10	Live from the Kitchen	Yo Gotti	Hip hop
10	These Times	SafetySuit	Alternative rock; pop rock
10	Socratic	Socratic	Pop-punk
17	Beautiful Things	Anthony Green	Indie
17	Kidz Bop 21	Kidz Bop Kids	Pop
24	100 Proof	Kellie Pickler	Country
24	Attack on Memory	Cloud Nothings	Indie rock; garage rock; alternative rock
24	The Church of Rock and Roll	Foxy Shazam	Hard rock; glam rock
24	Emotional Traffic	Tim McGraw	Country
24	Human Again	Ingrid Michaelson	Indie pop
24	iSoundtrack II	iCarly	Pop
24	Let's Go Eat the Factory	Guided by Voices	Indie rock
24	Resolution	Lamb of God	Groove metal; thrash metal
24	Something	Chairlift	Synthpop; art pop; new wave; post-punk
24	The Stars Are Indifferent To Astronomy	Nada Surf	Alternative rock
24	We're Here with You	Julien K	Electronic rock; alternative rock; industrial rock; synth-pop
24	Wishing Well	Cheyenne Marie Mize	Folk rock
31	Beyond Magnetic (EP)	Metallica	Heavy metal; thrash metal; speed metal
31	Born to Die	Lana Del Rey	Alternative pop; baroque pop; indie pop; sadcore; trip hop
31	Invicta	Hit the Lights	Pop punk; indie rock; alternative rock

=== February ===
Date	Album	Artist	Genre(s)
7	Blues Funeral	Mark Lanegan	Alternative rock; blues rock
7	A Different Kind of Truth	Van Halen	Hard rock; heavy metal
7	Go Fly a Kite	Ben Kweller	Power pop; alt-country; folk rock
7	Home	Dierks Bentley	Country
7	Scars & Stories	The Fray	Alternative rock; pop rock; soft rock
7	Tramp	Sharon Van Etten	Indie folk
14	Continued Silence EP	Imagine Dragons	Alternative rock; indie rock; pop rock; pop
14	King or the Fool	Tony Williams	R&B
14	Muscle Car Chronicles	Curren$y	Hip hop; alternative hip hop
14	Ski Beatz 24 Hour Karate School Presents Twilight	Ski Beatz	Hip hop
21	Breakfast	Chiddy Bang	Hip hop
21	Careless World: Rise of the Last King	Tyga	Hip hop
21	Electric Sea	Buckethead	Ambient; classical; folk
21	On the Impossible Past	The Menzingers	Punk rock; heartland rock; emo; indie rock
21	Reign of Terror	Sleigh Bells	Noise pop; indie rock
21	Some Nights	fun.	Indie pop; rock
24	History Speaks	Deep Sea Diver	Indie rock
28	Black Belt Theatre	Planet Asia	Hip hop
28	Black Radio	Robert Glasper Experiment	Jazz; jazz rap; hip hop; R&B; soul
28	Corrosion of Conformity	Corrosion of Conformity	Stoner rock; sludge metal
28	The Day After Tomorrow	Maino	Hip hop
28	Ghostory	School of Seven Bells	Indie rock; dream pop; shoegaze; indietronica
28	God Save the King	Copywrite	Hip hop
28	Hordes of Zombies	Terrorizer	Deathgrind
28	The Minimal Wave Tapes Vol. 2	Stones Throw Records & Minimal Wave Records	
28	No Trespassing	Too $hort	Hip hop
28	PIL2	Ja Rule	Hip hop
28	WZRD	WZRD	Alternative rock

=== March ===
Date	Album	Artist	Genre(s)
6	Break it Yourself	Andrew Bird	Indie rock; baroque pop
6	Hit Me Like a Man EP	The Pretty Reckless	Alternative rock; hard rock; post-grunge
6	Mia Pharaoh	Miniature Tigers	Neo-psychedelia; dream pop; synthpop; indie pop
6	Milk Famous	White Rabbits	Indie rock
6	Now	Fireflight	Christian rock; hard rock; post-grunge
6	Rapper's Best Friend 2	The Alchemist	Hip hop
6	Rigmarole	Pep Love	Hip hop
6	Threads	Now, Now	Indie rock
6	Wrecking Ball	Bruce Springsteen	Heartland rock; folk rock
13	Anarchy, My Dear	Say Anything	Alternative rock; pop punk
13	Felony Flats	Anya Marina	Indie rock; indie pop; alternative rock
13	Letters from Birmingham	Ruben Studdard	R&B; pop; soul
13	Port of Morrow	The Shins	Rock
13	Q.B. O.G.: The Best of MC Shan	MC Shan	Hip hop; R&B
13	South Bronx Teachings: A Collection of Boogie Down Productions	Boogie Down Productions	Hip hop
13	Torture	Cannibal Corpse	Death metal
20	Building	Brian Larsen	Rock; Pop rock
20	The General Strike	Anti-Flag	Punk rock
20	Mixed Emotions	Tanlines	electronic; indie rock
20	The Odd Future Tape Vol. 2	Odd Future	Hip hop
20	Radio Music Society	Esperanza Spalding	Contemporary jazz
20	Unexpected Arrival	Diggy	Hip hop; R&B
27	Amaryllis	Shinedown	Hard rock; alternative metal; post-grunge
27	The Block Brochure: Welcome to the Soil 1	E-40	Hip hop
27	The Block Brochure: Welcome to the Soil 2	E-40	Hip hop
27	The Block Brochure: Welcome to the Soil 3	E-40	Hip hop
27	Covered	Macy Gray	R&B; soul; rock
27	The Electric Age	Overkill	Thrash metal
27	Kids in the Street	The All-American Rejects	Alternative rock; power pop
27	Kolexxxion	Bumpy Knuckles & DJ Premier	Hip hop
27	MDNA	Madonna	Dance-pop; electropop; electro house; Eurodance; EDM; Euro house
27	The Next Logical Progression	Gift of Gab	Hip hop
27	The Night the Sun Came Up	Dev	Electropop; dance-pop
27	Noctourniquet	The Mars Volta	Progressive rock; experimental rock
27	Take Me to Your Leader	¡Mayday!	Hip hop; rap rock; alternative rock; alternative hip hop
27	Relapse	Ministry	Industrial metal; thrash metal
27	Seeds	Georgia Anne Muldrow & Madlib	
27	Teenage Dream: The Complete Confection	Katy Perry	Pop; pop rock
27	Tuskegee	Lionel Richie	Country; R&B; pop
27	Vulnerable	The Used	Emo; post-hardcore; alternative rock

=== April ===
Date	Album	Artist
3	Bottoms Up	Obie Trice
3	Changed	Rascal Flatts
3	Forget the Storm	Tyler Hilton
3	I Love You, It's Cool	Bear in Heaven
3	The Lumineers	The Lumineers
3	Pink Friday: Roman Reloaded	Nicki Minaj
3	Plans Within Plans	MxPx
3	Sick-Wid-It Block Op	Laroo & Turf Talk
3	Weapons	Lostprophets
10	Bridges	Moka Only & Ayatollah
10	Dead Sara	Dead Sara
10	The Fatal Feast	Municipal Waste
10	The Good Life	Trip Lee
10	The Liquid Crystal Project III	J. Rawls
10	New Life	Monica
10	Slipstream	Bonnie Raitt
10	Underwater Sunshine (Or What We Did On Our Summer Vacation)	Counting Crows
10	Vava Voom	Bassnectar
14	Balloon Cement	Buckethead
17	California 37	Train
17	I Missed Us	SWV
17	Looking for More	Lauren & Kara
17	Love is a Four Letter Word	Jason Mraz
17	Pluto	Future
17	Picture Show	Neon Trees
17	Raw	Blanco & Nipsey Hussle
24	Blunderbuss	Jack White
24	Generation Freakshow	Feeder
24	Lillie: F-65	Saint Vitus
24	Loaded	Mickey Avalon
24	Mondo	Electric Guest
24	The Money Store	Death Grips
24	Speak in Code	Eve 6
24	This Machine	The Dandy Warhols
24	Up All Night	Kip Moore

=== May ===
Date	Album	Artist
1	All or Nothing	Pennywise
1	Blown Away	Carrie Underwood
1	Born Villain	Marilyn Manson
1	Interludes After Midnight	Blockhead
1	Little Broken Hearts	Norah Jones
1	Master of My Make-Believe	Santigold
1	Sound the Drum	The Mowgli's
1	Strange Clouds	B.o.B
8	Babylon	Matt Skiba and the Sekrets
8	Hello	Karmin
8	In the Belly of the Brazen Bull	The Cribs
8	Jacaranda	Trevor Rabin
8	Journey Through the Shadows	The Parlotones
8	The Looking Away	Animal Kingdom
8	Lovers	The Royalty
8	Neck of the Woods	Silversun Pickups
8	Strangeland	Keane
8	This Is How I Feel	Tank
8	Underground Superstars	Punchline & DJ Soulclap
15	Exister	Hot Water Music
15	Fire From the Sky	Shadows Fall
15	Go! Pop! Bang!	Rye Rye
15	Me.Me.	Plushgun
15	Not Your Kind of People	Garbage
15	The Only Place	Best Coast
15	R.A.P. Music	Killer Mike
15	Rize of the Fenix	Tenacious D
15	Taster's Choice Vol. 6	J Rocc
15	Trespassing	Adam Lambert
15	The Temper Trap	The Temper Trap
22	2012	2012 (Statik Selektah & Termanology)
22	3's	Smile Empty Soul
22	Apocalyptic Love	Slash & Myles Kennedy and the Conspirators
22	Beneath the Scars	12 Stones
22	Born and Raised	John Mayer
22	Cancer 4 Cure	El-P
22	Gestalt	The Spill Canvas
22	He Still Think He Raw	Casual
22	Listen Up!	Haley Reinhart
22	Once Upon Another Time (EP)	Sara Bareilles
22	Thank You Camellia	Kris Allen
22	The Wolf You Feed	The Riverboat Gamblers
29	Anxiety	Ladyhawke
29	From Day 1	Travis Porter
29	Heaven	The Walkmen
29	Here	Edward Sharpe and the Magnetic Zeros
29	Magic Hour	Scissor Sisters
29	What We Saw from the Cheap Seats	Regina Spektor

=== June ===
Date	Album	Artist
4	Manifest!	Friends
5	Celebration Rock	Japandroids
5	Dope Sick	Mad Child
5	Hope (EP)	Hawthorne Heights
5	The Industrialist	Fear Factory
5	Jennette McCurdy	Jennette McCurdy
5	K.I.C.K. P.U.S.H.	One Be Lo
5	Lex Hives	The Hives
5	Life Will Write The Words	The Rocket Summer
5	Live from the Underground	Big K.R.I.T.
5	Love & Danger	Kool Keith
5	Machines That Make Civilization Fun	Bigg Jus
5	OhNoMite	Oh No
5	Prisoners	The Agonist
5	Safe Travels	Jukebox the Ghost
5	Sand & Snow	A Silent Film
5	The Stoned Immaculate	Curren$y
5	That's Why God Made the Radio	The Beach Boys
5	Thirty Miles West	Alan Jackson
12	Comet	The Bouncing Souls
12	Dedication (EP)	Rome
12	Dirty Bass	Far East Movement
12	Go	Motion City Soundtrack
12	Looking 4 Myself	Usher
12	People Hear What They See	Oddisee
12	The Photo Album	Wordsworth
12	Since Our Departure	Dinner and a Suit
12	Through the Glass (EP)	Atlas Genius
12	Triple F Life: Fans, Friends & Family	Waka Flocka Flame
12	Up & Away	Kid Ink
19	Attractive Sin	Del the Funky Homosapien & Parallel Thought
19	Believe	Justin Bieber
19	Cabin by the Sea	The Dirty Heads
19	The Idler Wheel...	Fiona Apple
19	The Last Outlaw	Pastor Troy
19	Let It Go	House Shoes
19	Rejuvenation	Juvenile
19	Oceania	The Smashing Pumpkins
19	Rugby Thompson	Smoke DZA
19	Still Doubted?	Lil Wyte
19	The View from the Bottom	Lit
19	Walk the Moon	Walk the Moon
25	Gone	Vacationer
26	Challenger	Memphis May Fire
26	Days Go By	The Offspring
26	The Grustle	Lil Scrappy
26	Invisible Stars	Everclear
26	Living Things	Linkin Park
26	Overexposed	Maroon 5
26	Professor @ Large	Large Professor
26	PTX, Volume 1	Pentatonix
26	Self Made Vol. 2	Maybach Music Group
26	Write Me Back	R. Kelly

=== July ===
Date	Album	Artist
3	Fortune	Chris Brown
3	H.N.I.C. Part 3	Prodigy
3	Wild Ones	Flo Rida
7	Flying by Wire	Trocadero
10	Channel Orange	Frank Ocean
10	Cookies 'n Cream	Blanco & Yukmouth
10	Harakiri	Serj Tankian
10	In Currents	The Early November
10	Most of My Heroes Still Don't Appear on No Stamp	Public Enemy
10	Murdered Love	P.O.D.
10	Skelethon	Aesop Rock
10	Uncaged	Zac Brown Band
10	Voyeur	Saint Motel
17	All I Was	Mark Tremonti
17	Band of Brothers	Hellyeah
17	Beautiful Friction	The Fixx
17	Collide with the Sky	Pierce the Veil
17	Delayed Reaction	Soul Asylum
17	Kidz Bop 22	Kidz Bop Kids
17	Life Is Good	Nas
17	Milo Greene	Milo Greene
17	Rebirth	Jimmy Cliff
17	Russian Roulette	The Alchemist
17	Snowgoons Dynasty	Snowgoons
17	Songs of Patience	Alberta Cross
17	Spark Seeker	Matisyahu
17	Weight & Glory	KB
24	Dance Again... the Hits	Jennifer Lopez
24	Gossamer	Passion Pit
24	Handwritten	The Gaslight Anthem
24	REBELutionary	Reks & Numonics
31	C.A.R.	Serengeti
31	Dark Roots of Earth	Testament
31	God Forgives, I Don't	Rick Ross
31	Lap of Lux	Sir Michael Rocks
31	Masters of the Dark Arts	La Coka Nostra
31	Nicole & Natalie	Nina Sky

=== August ===
Date	Album	Artist
7	Lost in Transition	Sixpence None the Richer
7	The New Frontier	Kokane & Traffik
7	Perfectly Imperfect	Elle Varner
9	The Shores of Molokai	Buckethead
14	Based on a T.R.U. Story	2 Chainz
14	Blood	In This Moment
14	Freaky Tales	Insane Clown Posse
14	The Mighty Death Pop!	Insane Clown Posse
14	Mike E. Clark's Extra Pop Emporium	Mike E. Clark & Insane Clown Posse
14	Smothered, Covered & Chunked	Insane Clown Posse
14	Southern Air	Yellowcard
14	Top of the World	Slightly Stoopid
20	The Glorious Dead	The Heavy
21	Chapter V	Trey Songz
21	Four	Bloc Party
21	Fragrant World	Yeasayer
21	Hot Cakes	The Darkness
21	Kiss the Ring	DJ Khaled
21	Last of a Dyin' Breed	Lynyrd Skynyrd
21	The Midsummer Station	Owl City
21	Wait for the Siren	Project 86
21	Year of the Dragon	Busta Rhymes
28	Beautiful Surprise	Tamia
28	The Circle in the Square	Flobots
28	Eye on It	TobyMac
28	Havoc and Bright Lights	Alanis Morissette
28	Infinity Overhead	Minus the Bear
28	Off the Record (EP)	Torae
28	Sublime Currency	Abandoned Pools
28	This Time	Beanie Sigel
28	Violent Waves	Circa Survive
28	Welcome to: Our House	Slaughterhouse

=== September ===
Date	Album	Artist
4	4th Street Feeling	Melissa Etheridge
4	Beacon	Two Door Cinema Club
4	Centipede Hz	Animal Collective
4	Give Me My Flowers While I Can Still Smell Them	Blu & Exile
4	Gravity	Lecrae
4	Night Visions	Imagine Dragons
4	North	Matchbox Twenty
4	The North	Stars
4	Push Rewind	Chris Wallace
4	Silver Age	Bob Mould
4	The Sheepdogs	The Sheepdogs
11	Away from the World	Dave Matthews Band
11	Bright Black Heaven	Blaqk Audio
11	Coexist	The xx
11	Dead Silence	Billy Talent
11	Elysium	Pet Shop Boys
11	Fight or Flight	Hoobastank
11	Old World Romance	Sea Wolf
11	Self Entitled	NOFX
11	Tempest	Bob Dylan
11	Theatre Is Evil	Amanda Palmer & the Grand Theft Orchestra
11	Tornado	Little Big Town
11	Undisputed	DMX
18	Bad 25	Michael Jackson
18	Battle Born	The Killers
18	Charmer	Aimee Mann
18	Cinematics	Set It Off
18	Close the Distance	Go Radio
18	Cruel Summer	GOOD Music
18	Down IV Part I – The Purple EP	Down
18	Enjoy the Company	The Whigs
18	First of a Living Breed	Homeboy Sandman
18	Hallelujah! I'm a Bum	Local H
18	Libertine	Liv Kristine
18	Mirage Rock	Band of Horses
18	Mourning in America and Dreaming in Color	Brother Ali
18	Shields	Grizzly Bear
18	Somethin' 'Bout Kreay	Kreayshawn
18	The Sound of the Life of the Mind	Ben Folds Five
18	Tomorrowland	Ryan Bingham
18	Tomahawk Technique	Sean Paul
18	The Truth About Love	P!nk
20	March of the Slunks	Buckethead
20	Racks	Buckethead
20	The Silent Picture Book	Buckethead
25	Aftermath Of The Lowdown	Richie Sambora
25	Fame and Fortune	Lucy Fleming
25	Food & Liquor II: The Great American Rap Album Pt. 1	Lupe Fiasco
25	Hayley Sings	Rachael MacFarlane
25	Payback	Danny!
25	Push and Shove	No Doubt
25	Ricanstruction: The Black Rosary	Chino XL
25	Strapped	The Soft Pack
25	This Generation	Murs & Fashawn
25	¡Uno!	Green Day

=== October ===
Date	Album	Artist
1	No Love Deep Web	Death Grips
2	The Bumpy Johnson Album	Prodigy
2	Cedar + Gold	Tristan Prettyman
2	Come of Age	The Vaccines
2	Kaleidoscope Dream	Miguel
2	Lightning	Matt & Kim
2	Officially Miss Guided	OMG Girlz
2	Paradise	Cody Simpson
2	Quality Street Music	DJ Drama
2	Transit of Venus	Three Days Grace
2	Until the Quiet Comes	Flying Lotus
9	119	Trash Talk
9	The Afterman: Ascension	Coheed and Cambria
9	All We Love We Leave Behind	Converge
9	Diluvia	Freelance Whales
9	Don't Panic	All Time Low
9	Glad All Over	The Wallflowers
9	The Heist	Macklemore and Ryan Lewis
9	Lace Up	MGK
9	Lonerism	Tame Impala
9	Monster	KISS
9	Mugshot Music	Showbiz and A.G.
9	Napalm	Xzibit
9	Numbers	MellowHype
9	Pines	A Fine Frenzy
9	Twins	Ty Segall
16	'Allelujah! Don't Bend! Ascend!	Godspeed You! Black Emperor
16	Country, God, or the Girl	K'naan
16	Christmas with Scotty McCreery	Scotty McCreery
16	Deleted Scenes	Blueprint
16	Dusk Till Dawn	Bobby V
16	Former Lives	Ben Gibbard
16	GMB	Pac Div
16	Information Retrieved	Pinback
16	Negroes on Ice	Prince Paul
16	Night Train	Jason Aldean
16	Sing to Me (EP)	Savannah Outen
16	Sunken Condos	Donald Fagen
16	Two Eleven	Brandy
16	A Very Merry Perri Christmas (EP)	Christina Perri
16	A Very Special Christmas 25th Anniversary	Big Machine Records
16	A Very Special Christmas: Bringing Peace on Earth	World Records
16	Vital	Anberlin
22	Banks	Paul Banks
22	Cobra Juicy	Black Moth Super Rainbow
22	Christmas in the Sand	Colbie Caillat
22	God of the Serengeti	Vinnie Paz
22	good kid, m.A.A.d city	Kendrick Lamar
22	Hello My Name Is...	Bridgit Mendler
22	III	Shiny Toy Guns
22	Les Is More	Ryan Leslie
22	On This Winter's Night	Lady Antebellum
22	Red	Taylor Swift
23	Kids Raising Kids	Kopecky Family Band
30	Cee Lo's Magic Moment	Cee Lo Green
30	Dreams & Nightmares	Meek Mill
30	Mic Tyson	Sean Price
30	The Movement	Rusted Root
30	New Horizons	Flyleaf
30	Ramblings of an Angry Old Man	Craig G
30	Sorry to Bother You	The Coup

=== November ===
Date	Album	Artist
5	Glee: The Music Presents Glease	Glee Cast
6	Fizzyology	Lil' Fame & Termanology
6	The Greatest Story Never Told Chapter 2: Bread and Circuses	Saigon
6	History: Function Music	E-40 & Too Short
6	History: Mob Music	E-40 & Too Short
6	Life Behind Machines	Allister
6	Music from Another Dimension!	Aerosmith
6	R.E.D.	Ne-Yo
9	Lotus	Christina Aguilera
13	¡Dos!	Green Day
13	King Animal	Soundgarden
13	Koi No Yokan	Deftones
13	Paradise	Lana Del Rey
13	Infamous	Motionless in White
13	PTXmas	Pentatonix
13	Reloaded	Roc Marciano
13	Standing Ovation: The Greatest Songs from the Stage	Susan Boyle
13	The Solution	Buckshot & 9th Wonder
13	Vicious Lies and Dangerous Rumors	Big Boi
13	The World's Most Hardest MC Project	Styles P
13	Wu Block	Wu-Tang Clan & D-Block Records
16	Midnight Special	Uncle Kracker
16	Rebel Soul	Kid Rock
19	Global Warming	Pitbull
19	The Greatest Hits	3 Doors Down
19	Greatest Hits • Chapter One	Kelly Clarkson
19	The World from the Side of the Moon	Phillip Phillips
19	Truth Be Told, Part 1	Greyson Chance
19	Woman to Woman	Keyshia Cole
20	Twelve Reasons to Die	Ghostface Killah
20	Long Live the Hustle	DJ Scream
20	Prisoner of Conscious	Talib Kweli
23	The Evolution of Man	Example
27	The Art of War III	Bone Thugs-n-Harmony
27	Diamond in the Ruff	Freeway
27	Girl on Fire	Alicia Keys
27	Glee: The Music, Season 4, Vol. 1	Glee Cast
27	These Are the Times	Neako

=== December ===
Date	Album	Artist
4	O.N.I.F.C.	Wiz Khalifa
4	Warrior	Kesha
11	Almería	Lifehouse
11	Jesus Piece	Game
11	The Music of Nashville: Season 1, Volume 1	Nashville cast
11	¡Tré!	Green Day
11	Unorthodox Jukebox	Bruno Mars
11	Vicious Lies and Dangerous Rumors	Big Boi
18	Finally Rich	Chief Keef
18	Trouble Man: Heavy is the Head	T.I.

== Top songs on record ==
=== Billboard Hot 100 No. 1 Songs ===
- "Call Me Maybe" – Carly Rae Jepsen (9 weeks)
- "Diamonds" – Rihanna (3 weeks)
- "Locked Out of Heaven" – Bruno Mars (2 weeks in 2012, 4 weeks in 2013)
- "One More Night" – Maroon 5 (9 weeks)
- "Part of Me" – Katy Perry (1 week)
- "Set Fire to the Rain" – Adele (2 weeks)
- "Sexy and I Know It" – LMFAO (2 weeks)
- "Somebody That I Used to Know" – Gotye feat. Kimbra (8 weeks)
- "Stronger (What Doesn't Kill You)" – Kelly Clarkson (3 weeks)
- "We Are Never Ever Getting Back Together" – Taylor Swift (3 weeks)
- "We Are Young" – fun. feat. Janelle Monáe (6 weeks)
- "We Found Love" – Rihanna feat. Calvin Harris (2 weeks in 2012, 8 weeks in 2011)
- "Whistle" – Flo Rida (2 weeks)

=== Billboard Hot 100 Top 20 Hits ===
All songs that reached the Top 20 on the Billboard Hot 100 chart during the year, complete with peak chart placement.

- "5 O'Clock" – T-Pain feat. Wiz Khalifa and Lily Allen (#13 in 2012, #10 in 2011)
- "50 Ways to Say Goodbye" – Train (#20)
- "Adorn" – Miguel (#17)
- "As Long as You Love Me" – Justin Bieber feat. Big Sean (#6)
- "Ass Back Home" – Gym Class Heroes feat. Neon Hitch (#12)
- "Back in Time" – Pitbull (#11)
- "Beauty and a Beat" – Justin Bieber feat. Nicki Minaj (#7)
- "Begin Again" – Taylor Swift (#7)
- "Blow Me (One Last Kiss)" – Pink (#5)
- "Blown Away" – Carrie Underwood (#20)
- "Both of Us" – B.o.B feat. Taylor Swift (#18)
- "Boyfriend" – Justin Bieber (#2)
- "Brokenhearted" – Karmin (#16)
- "Call Me Maybe" – Carly Rae Jepsen (#1)
- "Catch My Breath" – Kelly Clarkson (#19)
- "Climax" – Usher (#17)
- "Clique" – Kanye West, Jay-Z and Big Sean (#12)
- "Cruise" – Florida Georgia Line (#16)
- "Dance (A$$)" – Big Sean feat. Nicki Minaj (#10)
- "Dance Again" – Jennifer Lopez feat. Pitbull (#17)
- "Diamonds" – Rihanna (#1)
- "Die in Your Arms" – Justin Bieber (#17)
- "Die Young" – Kesha (#2)
- "Domino" – Jessie J (#6)
- "Don't Wake Me Up" – Chris Brown (#10)
- "Don't You Worry Child" – Swedish House Mafia feat. John Martin (#12)
- "Drive By" – Train (#10)
- "Drunk on You" – Luke Bryan (#16)
- "Everybody Talks" – Neon Trees (#6)
- "Eyes Open" – Taylor Swift (#19)
- "Feel So Close" – Calvin Harris (#12)
- "Gangnam Style" – PSY (#2)
- "Girl on Fire" – Alicia Keys feat. Nicki Minaj (#11)
- "Give Me All Your Luvin'" – Madonna feat. Nicki Minaj and M.I.A. (#10)
- "Give Your Heart a Break" – Demi Lovato (#16)
- "Glad You Came" – The Wanted (#3)
- "Good Feeling" – Flo Rida (#3)
- "Good Girl" – Carrie Underwood (#18)
- "Good Time" – Owl City and Carly Rae Jepsen (#8)
- "Headlines" – Drake (#15 in 2012, #13 in 2011)
- "Ho Hey" – The Lumineers (#3)
- "Home" – Phillip Phillips (#7)
- "I Cry" – Flo Rida (#6)
- "I Knew You Were Trouble" – Taylor Swift (#3)
- "I Will Always Love You" – Whitney Houston (#3 in 2012, #1 in 1992)
- "I Won't Give Up" – Jason Mraz (#8)
- "International Love" – Pitbull feat. Chris Brown (#13)
- "It Will Rain" – Bruno Mars (#3)
- "It's Time" – Imagine Dragons (#19)
- "Let Me Love You (Until You Learn to Love Yourself)" – Ne-Yo (#6)
- "Let's Go" – Calvin Harris feat. Ne-Yo (#17)
- "Lights" – Ellie Goulding (#2)
- "Live While We're Young" – One Direction (#3)
- "Locked Out of Heaven" – Bruno Mars (#1)
- "Mercy" – Kanye West feat. Big Sean, Pusha T and 2 Chainz (#13)
- "Mistletoe" – Justin Bieber (#19 in 2012, #11 in 2011)
- "Moves like Jagger" – Maroon 5 feat. Christina Aguilera (#11 in 2012, #1 in 2011)
- "Mr. Know It All" – Kelly Clarkson (#20 in 2012, #10 in 2011)
- "Niggas in Paris" – Jay-Z and Kanye West (#5)
- "Not Over You" – Gavin DeGraw (#18)
- "One More Night" – Maroon 5 (#1)
- "Paradise" – Coldplay (#20 in 2012, #15 in 2011)
- "Part of Me" – Katy Perry (#1)
- "Party Rock Anthem" – LMFAO feat. Lauren Bennett and GoonRock (#6 in 2012, #1 in 2011)
- "Payphone" – Maroon 5 feat. Wiz Khalifa (#2)
- "Pound the Alarm" – Nicki Minaj (#15)
- "Pumped Up Kicks" – Foster the People (#19 in 2012, #3 in 2011)
- "Rack City" – Tyga (#7)
- "Red" – Taylor Swift (#6)
- "Red Solo Cup" – Toby Keith (#15)
- "Rolling in the Deep" – Adele (#5 in 2012, #1 in 2011)
- "Ronan" – Taylor Swift (#16)
- "Rumour Has It" – Adele (#16)
- "Scream" – Usher (#9)
- "Scream & Shout" – will.i.am feat. Britney Spears (#12)
- "Set Fire to the Rain" – Adele (#1)
- "Sexy and I Know It" – LMFAO (#1)
- "Skyfall" – Adele (#8)
- "So Good" – B.o.B (#11)
- "Some Nights" – fun. (#3)
- "Somebody That I Used to Know" – Gotye feat. Kimbra (#1)
- "Someone like You – Adele (#7 in 2012, #1 in 2011)
- "Springsteen" – Eric Church (#19)
- "Starships" – Nicki Minaj (#5)
- "State of Grace" – Taylor Swift (#13)
- "Stereo Hearts" – Gym Class Heroes feat. Adam Levine (#10 in 2012, #4 in 2011)
- "Stronger (What Doesn't Kill You)" – Kelly Clarkson (#1)
- "Swimming Pools (Drank)" – Kendrick Lamar (#17)
- "Take a Little Ride" – Jason Aldean (#12)
- "Take Care" – Drake feat. Rihanna (#7)
- "The A Team" – Ed Sheeran (#17)
- "The Motto" – Drake feat. Lil Wayne (#14)
- "The One That Got Away" – Katy Perry (#3)
- "Thrift Shop" – Macklemore and Ryan Lewis feat. Wanz (#13)
- "Titanium" – David Guetta feat. Sia (#7)
- "Too Close" – Alex Clare (#7)
- "Try" – Pink (#14)
- "Turn Me On" – David Guetta feat. Nicki Minaj (#4)
- "Turn Up the Music" – Chris Brown (#10)
- "Want U Back" – Cher Lloyd (#12)
- "Wanted" – Hunter Hayes (#16)
- "We Are Never Ever Getting Back Together" – Taylor Swift (#1)
- "We Are Young" – fun. feat. Janelle Monáe (#1)
- "We Found Love" – Rihanna feat. Calvin Harris (#1)
- "What Makes You Beautiful" – One Direction (#4)
- "Where Have You Been" – Rihanna (#5)
- "Whistle" – Flo Rida (#1)
- "Wide Awake" – Katy Perry (#2)
- "Wild Ones" – Flo Rida feat. Sia (#5)
- "Without You" – David Guetta feat. Usher (#14 in 2012, #4 in 2011)
- "Work Hard, Play Hard" – Wiz Khalifa (#17)
- "Work Out" – J. Cole (#13)
- "Young, Wild & Free" – Snoop Dogg and Wiz Khalifa feat. Bruno Mars (#7)

== Deaths ==
- January 1 – Fred Milano, 72, singer (The Belmonts)
- January 2 – Larry Reinhardt, 63, rock guitarist (Iron Butterfly)
- January 17 – Johnny Otis, 90, singer
- January 20
  - Etta James, 73, singer
  - John Levy, 99, bassist and manager
- January 21 – Gerre Hancock, 77, organist and composer
- January 25 – Mark Reale, 56, guitarist and songwriter (Riot)
- January 26 – Clare Fischer, 83, composer, arranger, keyboardist
- January 29 – Kell Osborne, 72, singer
- February 1 – David Peaston, 54, gospel singer
- February 5 – Al De Lory, 82, keyboard player, producer, and conductor
- February 7 – Robert Maxwell, 90, harpist and songwriter
- February 8 – Jimmy Sabater, 75, singer and timbales player
- February 11 – Whitney Houston, 48, singer
- February 12 – Zina Bethune, 66, actress, dancer, and choreographer
- February 13 – Russell Arms, 92, actor and singer
- February 22
  - Mike Melvoin, 74, pianist and composer (The Wrecking Crew)
  - Billy Strange, 81, singer-songwriter, guitarist, and actor (The Wrecking Crew)
- February 29 – Davy Jones, 66, British singer, percussionist (The Monkees)
- March 6 – Robert B. Sherman, 86, American songwriter (The Sherman Brothers)
- March 24 – Marion Marlowe, 83, singer and actress
- March 28 – Earl Scruggs, 88, bluegrass musician (Flatt and Scruggs)
- April 19
  - Greg Ham, 58, Australian songwriter, multi-instrumentalist (Men at Work)
  - Levon Helm, 71, American singer, drummer (The Band)
- May 4 – Adam "MCA" Yauch, 47, rapper, bassist (Beastie Boys)
- May 5 – Joe Russell, 72, singer (The Persuasions)
- May 8 – Everett Lilly, 87, singer-songwriter and guitarist (The Lilly Brothers)
- May 12 – Snooky Young, 92, American trumpet player (The Thad Jones/Mel Lewis Orchestra and Count Basie Orchestra)
- May 13 – Donald "Duck" Dunn, 70, bassist (Booker T. & the M.G.'s)
- May 15 – Joe Sell, 33, guitarist (Lucky Boys Confusion)
- May 16 – Chuck Brown, 75, guitarist and singer
- May 17 – Donna Summer, 63, singer
- May 29 – Doc Watson, 89, singer
- June 4 – Herb Reed, 83, vocalist and founder of The Platters
- June 7 – Bob Welch, 66, guitarist (Fleetwood Mac)
- June 10 – Jimmy Elledge, 69, country musician
- June 21 – Richard Adler, 90, composer and producer
- June 27 – Don Grady, 68, drummer (The Yellow Balloon), musician and actor
- July 1 – Ossie Hibbert, 61, Jamaican-American keyboard player and producer (The Aggrovators and The Revolutionaries)
- July 3 – Andy Griffith, 86, actor, singer
- July 7 – Dennis Flemion, 75, drummer (The Frogs)
- July 13 – Ginny Tyler, 86, voice actress and singer
- July 16 – Kitty Wells, 92, country music singer
- July 17 – Ms. Melodie, 43, rapper
- July 24 – Larry Hoppen, 61, singer and guitarist (Orleans)
- July 27 – Tony Martin, 98, singer and actor
- July 31
  - Bobby Edwards, 86, country music singer
  - Tony Sly, 41, singer (No Use for a Name)
- August 1 – Douglas Townsend, 90, composer and musicologist
- August 2
  - Jimmy Jones, 75, singer-songwriter
  - Marguerite Piazza, 92, soprano
- August 6 – Marvin Hamlisch, 68, composer and conductor
- August 18 – Scott McKenzie, 73, singer ("San Francisco (Be Sure to Wear Flowers in Your Hair)")
- September 1 – Hal David, 91, lyricist ("Raindrops Keep Falling on My Head")
- September 5 – Joe South, 72, singer-songwriter ("Down in the Boondocks", "Games People Play", "Hush", "Rose Garden")
- September 25 – Andy Williams, 84, singer ("Moon River", "It's the Most Wonderful Time of the Year")
- September 27 – R. B. Greaves, 68, singer
- October 1 – Sahara Davenport, 27, drag queen singer
- October 7 – Wiley Reed, 68, American-Australian singer-songwriter and pianist
- October 21 – Tim Johnson, 52, country music songwriter
- October 24 – Bill Dees, 73, musician and songwriter ("Oh, Pretty Woman", "It's Over")
- October 26 – Natina Reed, 31, singer/rapper (Blaque) and actress (Bring It On)
- October 27 – Terry Callier, 67, singer-songwriter
- November 1
  - Jan Crutchfield, 74, singer and songwriter
  - Mitch Lucker, 28, singer, lead vocalist of Suicide Silence
- November 12
  - Anthony di Bonaventura, 83, pianist and academic
  - Bob French, 74, drummer and radio host
- November 17 – Billy Scott, 70, R&B singer
- November 25 – Earl Carroll, 75, American singer (The Cadillacs, The Coasters)
- November 27 – Mickey Baker, 87, guitarist (Mickey & Sylvia)
- December 1 – Dee Harvey, 47, R&B singer
- December 5 – Dave Brubeck, 91, pianist
- December 9 – Jenni Rivera, 43, singer
- December 12 – Eddie "Guitar" Burns, 84, singer-songwriter and guitarist
- December 19 – Inez Andrews, 83, gospel singer and songwriter
- December 20 – Jimmy McCracklin, 91, singer, songwriter and pianist
- December 21 – Lee Dorman, 70, bassist (Iron Butterfly, Captain Beyond)
- December 22 – Marva Whitney, 68, singer
- December 24
  - Ray Collins, 76, singer (The Mothers of Invention)
  - Capital STEEZ, 19, hip-hop artist
- December 26 – Fontella Bass, 72, singer ("Rescue Me")

== See also ==
- 2012 in music
- List of 2012 albums
- 2012 in heavy metal music
- List of Billboard Hot 100 top 10 singles in 2012
