= Void (Intronaut album) =

Studio album by Intronaut
- Released: August 23, 2006
- Recorded: Early April, 2006; Shiva Industries in Santa Ana, California
- Genre: Progressive metal, post-metal, sludge metal
- Length: 43:17; 50:09 (with bonus track)
- Label: Goodfellow Records
- Producer: John Haddad

Intronaut chronology
Null (2006)	Void (2006)	Prehistoricisms (2008)

Professional ratings
Review scores
Source	Rating
About.com	4.5/5 stars
Allmusic	3.5/5 stars
Blabbermouth.net	10/10
Chronicles of Chaos	10/10

Void is the debut studio album by American progressive metal band Intronaut. It was released on August 23, 2006, in the United States through Goodfellow Records.

== Track listing ==
No.	Title	Length
1.	"A Monolithic Vulgarity"	5:59
2.	"Gleamer"	5:26
3.	"Fault Lines"	6:25
4.	"Nostalgic Echo"	5:19
5.	"Teledildonics"	7:09
6.	"Iceblocks"	6:33
7.	"Rise to the Midden"	6:31
Total length:		43:22

iTunes edition
No.	Title	Length
8.	"Fragments of Character"	6:53
Total length:		50:15

== Credits ==
=== Band members ===
- Sacha Dunable − guitar, vocals
- Leon del Muerte − guitar, vocals
- Joe Lester − bass
- Danny Walker − drums, samples

=== Other ===
- Recorded and mixed by John Haddad at the Trench Studios
- Logo, illustrations and layout by Justin Bartlett
