= Obscene Humanity =

2009 EP by Nails

EP by Nails
- Released: 2009
- Genre: Grindcore • powerviolence
- Length: 10:56
- Label: Six Feet Under Records
- Producer: Alex Estrada

Nails chronology
Obscene Humanity (2009)	Unsilent Death (2010)

Professional ratings
Review scores
Source	Rating
Punknews	4.5/5 stars

Obscene Humanity is the debut release by American band Nails. The album was originally released as a seven song, one sided vinyl, with the track list repeating on the reverse side. The band would later re-record three songs from this EP with Kurt Ballou to serve as a precursor to their 2013 album Abandon All Life.

== Track listing ==
1. "Disorder" - 1:09
2. "Alienate You II" - 0:42
3. "Obscene Humanity" - 1:42
4. "White Walls" - 1:09
5. "Confront Them" - 1:21
6. "Lies" - 3:37
7. "Alienate You I" - 1:13

== Obscene Humanity 7" ==
Obscene Humanity

EP by Nails
- Released: 2012
- Genre: Grindcore • powerviolence
- Length: 6:40
- Label: Southern Lord
- Producer: Kurt Ballou

Nails chronology
Unsilent Death (2010)	Obscene Humanity (2012)	Nails/Skin Like Iron Split 7" (2012)

=== Track list ===
1. "Obscene Humanity" – 1:43
2. "Confront Them" – 1:20
3. "Lies" – 3:34
