= Weathervanes =

Weathervanes may refer to:

- Weathervanes (Freelance Whales album), released in 2009
- Weathervanes (Jason Isbell and the 400 Unit album), released in 2023

== See also ==
- Weather vane
