= Every Bridge Burning =

Studio album by Nails
- Released: August 30, 2024
- Recorded: October 2023 – January 2024
- Genres: Grindcore; powerviolence; hardcore punk
- Length: 17:47
- Label: Nuclear Blast
- Producer: Kurt Ballou

Nails chronology
I Don't Want to Know You (2019)	Every Bridge Burning (2024)	Fear Based Life (2026)

Singles from Every Bridge Burning
- 1. "Imposing Will" Released: June 10, 2024; 2. "Give Me The Painkiller" Released: July 8, 2024; 3. "Lacking The Ability to Process Empathy" Released: August 5, 2024

Every Bridge Burning is the fourth studio album by American hardcore punk band Nails. It was released on August 30, 2024, through Nuclear Blast. It was released 8 years after their last album You Will Never Be One of Us, making it the longest gap between studio albums in their career. Kurt Ballou of Converge produced the album. It is the first Nails album to feature guitarist Shelby Lermo, drummer Carlos Cruz, and bassist Andrew Solis.

== Background ==
In an interview, lead singer Todd Jones said about the record "I think there’s a lot of lyrics about that and just kind of being isolated and stuff, it's definitely not a COVID themed record, but coming out of COVID, just expressing myself lyrically, I think a lot came out and it's just kind of seemed like friendships deteriorated during that time for a lot of people."

== Musical style ==
The album has been described as grindcore, powerviolence, and hardcore punk.

== Reception ==
Every Bridge Burning received positive reviews from music critics. Metal Hammer's Kez Whelan awarded it 3.5 stars and stated "What Every Bridge Burning lacks in depth, it more than makes up for in sheer energy." Max Heilman of Metal Injection said that "Every Bridge Burning shows that the Nails M.O. remains the same: to do as much damage in as little time as possible."

== Track listing ==
No.	Title	Length
1.	"Imposing Will"	1:22
2.	"Punishment Map"	1:03
3.	"Every Bridge Burning"	1:57
4.	"Give Me the Painkiller"	2:44
5.	"Lacking the Ability to Process Empathy"	2:03
6.	"Trapped"	0:38
7.	"Made Up in Your Mind"	1:04
8.	"Dehumanized"	1:20
9.	"I Can't Turn It Off"	2:19
10.	"No More Rivers to Cross"	3:14
Total length:		17:47
