= Doris Cellar =

American singer and songwriter (born 1984)

- Born: Nicole Mourelatos; October 10, 1984 (age 41)
- Origin: Queens, New York
- Genres: Indie rock; pop rock; baroque pop; experimental
- Occupations: Singer; songwriter; musician
- Formerly of: Freelance Whales
- Website: doriscellarmusic.com

Doris Cellar (born October 10, 1984) is an American singer-songwriter, producer, and multi-instrumentalist.

== Career ==
Doris Cellar was the front woman in the band the Freelance Whales who gained popularity in 2010 when Twitter selected Freelance Whales' music as the background for a video introducing a major rework of the service's user experience. This was followed by dozens of TV commercials and syncs, and the band toured both internationally and nationally.

In 2011 Cellar created and wrote an animal rights video for Peta and in 2012, Cellar wrote and sang lead for their sophomore single "Spitting image", which was featured on MTV as well The Inbetweeners of episode 10 The Dance. One reviewer said her vocals were "almost sweet enough to make us skip down the halls" while another mentioned them as an example of why the band "may red-line the Cute-O-Meter".

== Solo ==
Cellar is a multi-instrumentalist. She can switch musically between guitar, keyboards, bass, drums, percussion, harmonium, glockenspiel. She produces all of her own beats and performs without a backing band.

Cellar as a live performer has been described as "a wizard with all the instruments she manages to play all while smiling and dancing".

== Discography ==
=== Freelance Whales Studio Albums and Singles ===
- Freelance Whales - Weathervanes (April 13, 2010)
- Freelance Whales - Diluvia (October 9, 2012)
- Freelance Whales - "Hannah" (April 27, 2010)
- Freelance Whales - "Enzymes" (October 2010)
- Freelance Whales - "Day Off"
- Freelance Whales - "Generator ^ First Floor" (March 2011)
- Freelance Whales - "Spitting Image" (October 2012)

=== Solo extended plays ===
- Doris Cellar - Windows (April 26, 2012)
- Doris Cellar - Up On the Roof (June 10, 2013)
- Doris Cellar - Double Vision (March 12, 2017)

=== Solo singles ===
- Doris Cellar - "Big Kiss"
- Doris Cellar - "Inside your Groove" (May 12, 2014)
- Doris Cellar - "Chemistry" (February 3, 2017)
- Doris Cellar - "Tissues" (August 4, 2020)
