= Terrorizer =

American grindcore band

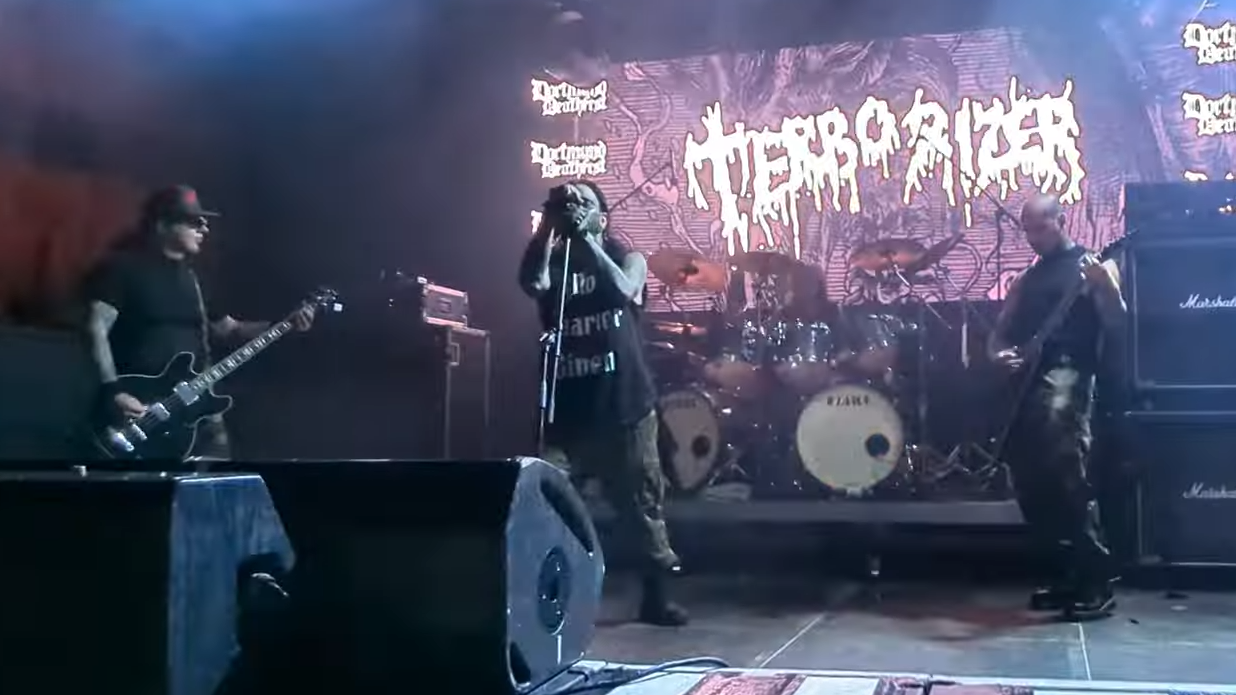
- Terrorizer performing in 2024

Background information
- Also known as: Unknown Death (1985–1986) Decomposed (1986)
- Origin: Los Angeles, California, U.S.
- Genres: Death-grind; death metal; grindcore
- Years active: 1985–1989; 2005–2006; 2009–2023; 2023–present
- Labels: Earache; Season of Mist; Century Media; Relativity; The End
- Spinoffs: Terrorizer LA
- Members: Pete Sandoval; Richie Brown; Antony Hämäläinen
- Past members: Oscar Garcia; Jesse Pintado; Alfred "Garvey" Estrada; Carlos Reveles; Tony Norman; Sam Molina; Anthony Rezhawk; Katina Culture; Lee Harrison; Fish; Brian Werner; David Vincent
- Website: terrorizergrindcore.net

Terrorizer is an American deathgrind band from Los Angeles, California. It was formed in 1985 as Unknown Death by vocalist Oscar Garcia and guitarist Jesse Pintado. They renamed themselves Terrorizer after recruiting drummer Pete Sandoval, who is the band's sole constant member, in 1986. The band's lineup consists of Sandoval, guitarist Richie Brown and vocalist Antony Hämäläinen. They are signed to Earache Records.

Terrorizer struggled to find success and disbanded in 1988 after Sandoval joined Morbid Angel. They briefly regrouped with David Vincent to record the debut album World Downfall (1989). They split up again later that year when Pintado joined Napalm Death. In 2005, Pintado and Sandoval reformed Terrorizer without Garcia, recording and released their second album, Darker Days Ahead, in 2006. Terrorizer became inactive due to Pintado's death five days after the album's release on August 27, 2006. After Sandoval revived it in 2009, Terrorizer has released two more albums, Hordes of Zombies (2012) and Caustic Attack (2018), each featuring a different lineup.

== History ==
=== Early history (1985–1988) ===
In 1985, after a brief membership with Majesty, vocalist and guitarist Oscar Garcia searching Los Angeles for musicians to form a band he could front. Garcia met guitarist Jesse Pintado, and they formed thrash metal band Unknown Death. Garcia and Pintado recruited bassist Alfred "Garvey" Estrada and a drummer known as "Fish".

Inspired by Slayer and Celtic Frost, Garcia and Pintado took Unknown Death in a faster direction, after Pintado received a demo tape featuring the A-side to Napalm Death's Scum (1987). Garcia recalled, "I remember one day, [Pintado] said, 'Check this out'. And when I listened to it for the first time, I called him and said, 'That's it, that's the way I wanna play'." Fish was unable to play to the speeds that Garcia and Pintado wanted, and he left the band. Drummer Pete Sandoval auditioned and was hired for Unknown Death. "The first beat that [Sandoval] played was a superfast beat, and when we heard that, Jesse and I looked at each other and we looked at Pete, and we were like, 'Hey man, you wanna join this band?' And he said, 'You guys haven't seen me play.' And I said, 'We've heard enough'." Sandoval's drumming complemented Unknown Death's older songs, and Garcia felt that "everything just started to click" when he joined the band. Unknown Death changed their name to Decomposed and then to Terrorizer, after a song of the same name by Master.

Terrorizer began playing around Los Angeles, performing their first show at the Hoover Recreation Centre on March 21, 1987. The band released four rehearsal/demo tapes during 1987 that circulated throughout the underground tape-trading scene. (Note: Terrorizer demo chronology: 1st demo (Nightmares): January 24, 1987; 2nd demo (Demo '87): April 25, 1987; 3rd demo: August 22, 1987; 4th demo (split w/ Nausea): December 1987; These demos were officially released in 2014 through the Terrorizer LA compilation Before the Downfall.) Terrorizer performed in small venues or at backyard parties for most of their initial existence, and struggled to attract record label interest due to the speed and intensity of their music, which made them unappealing to the heavy metal and punk rock audiences of the Los Angeles area. In the summer of 1988, with interest in and activity within Terrorizer waning, Sandoval joined Florida-based death metal band Morbid Angel at the behest of the band's bassist, David Vincent. (Note: Sandoval came to the attention of Morbid Angel after the band's guitarist, Trey Azagthoth, received one of Terrorizer's demo tapes. Vincent used his tape-trading contacts with Pintado to reach out to him with the offer.) He informed the other members of Terrorizer during a band rehearsal with new bassist Carlos Reveles (who Garcia had played with in Majesty) that he was joining Morbid Angel, resulting in their disbandment. Garcia recalled of Sandoval's departure, "At the time I thought we [Terrorizer] were just about ready to do an album. Then one day out of the blue at a practice, Pete just busted out saying that he was leaving the band and that he was moving out of state. And that was pretty much it for us then. It was like we never had a chance."

=== World Downfall and disbandment (1989–2004) ===
In early 1989, whilst in England delivering the master tapes of Morbid Angel's Altars of Madness to Earache Records, Vincent discussed Terrorizer with label founder Digby Pearson. Pearson told Vincent that Terrorizer was signed to Earache before Morbid Angel were, but that he had struggled to get the band to record an album due to its members being based in differing locations. Vincent offered to regroup Terrorizer to record an album, should Earache be interested in releasing one.

In April 1989, Garcia and Pintado travelled to Tampa, Florida, where Vincent and Sandoval were based, to record Terrorizer's debut album, World Downfall. The band spent two weeks "[rehearsing] all the songs like crazy" to make them as tight as possible (according to Vincent) before going into Morrisound Recording, where they recorded and mixed the album in three days with engineer Scott Burns. According to Burns, the album was recorded on $1,200. Pintado played all guitars on the album at Garcia's insistence, as he had not played guitar for six months and did not want to hold up recording. Terrorizer did not have a bassist, and because Pintado and Garcia did not have any bass equipment, Vincent played bass on the album. Although credited as producer of World Downfall and Terrorizer's bassist in the liner notes, Vincent later claimed that he "just played on the record" and was not an official member of the band at that point.

World Downfall was released via Earache on November 13, 1989. Shortly before release, Pintado left Terrorizer to join Napalm Death, before the start of the band's Grindcrusher Tour in November 1989. With Vincent and Sandoval refocusing on Morbid Angel—who were also participated in the Grindcrusher Tour as a supporting act along with Carcass and Bolt Thrower—Terrorizer disbanded a second time. Garcia returned to his other band, Nausea. In the 2018 documentary film Slave to the Grind: A Film About Grindcore, Sandoval said of Terrorizer's disbandment:

"There was not a lot of interest in Terrorizer, and plus, these other bands, for us, were big bands, y'know. Morbid Angel, they had like, a beginning of a history, you know what I mean? So it was something cool, nice for me to join. And then Napalm Death, another big band... so it was what it was supposed to be, man."

World Downfall has been regarded as a classic of early grindcore. Morbid Angel later incorporated the album track "Dead Shall Rise" into their setlists during their tours in support of Blessed Are the Sick (1991), which Vincent said the band were happy to do as "half of Morbid Angel had been in Terrorizer". Although still under contract with Earache, attempts to make another album with the World Downfall line-up were unsuccessful due to its members' conflicting schedules. Garcia claimed not to have talked to Sandoval since Terrorizer's disbandment.

=== Later history and albums. disbandment and reformation (2005–present) ===
In 2005, after leaving Napalm Death, Pintado reformed Terrorizer with Sandoval to release the album Darker Days Ahead through Century Media Records in August 2006. Garcia declined the reunion due to creative differences with Pintado, who wanted him to leave Nausea—he was replaced with Anthony Rezhawk. Tony Norman joined the band on guitar and bass. Pintado had been recording and playing shows with Rezhawk's band Resistant Culture and asked him to join Terrorizer. Pintado died five days after the album's release due to liver failure.

In 2009, Terrorizer released the demo track "Hordes of Zombies" on MySpace. In June 2011, Terrorizer signed to Season of Mist and released its third album, Hordes of Zombies, on February 28, 2012. Resistant Culture guitarist Katina Culture replaced Pintado and David Vincent rejoined on bass.

In November 2012, Sandoval announced that Terrorizer started writing material for their next album. The fourth album, Caustic Attack, was released in 2018 under The End Records.

On August 9, 2021, Earache Records announced a worldwide record deal with Terrorizer, and revealed that a new album was in the works.

On January 22, 2023, Sandoval announced the split of Terrorizer and shifted his attention to his other band, I Am Morbid. On August 12, Sandoval reformed Terrorizer with Vincent, alongside former Vital Remains vocalist Brian Werner and guitarist Richie Brown. As of May 2025, the band has been working on new music.

== Terrorizer LA ==
In 2014, Oscar Garcia was invited by Jesse Pintado's sister to put together a new lineup of Terrorizer (his version known as Terrorizer LA or TLA) for a festival celebrating what would have been Jesse Pintado's 45th birthday. He asked fellow Nausea member Leon del Muerte (Murder Construct) to play guitar, and shortly afterward Cosmo Reveles, Rick Cortez (Sadistic Intent), and Mike Caffell (Dreaming Dead, Exhausted Prayer) were recruited to fill out the band. The band continues to play under the Terrorizer LA name.

Before the Downfall, a collection of demos and unreleased material, was released by FOAD Records in 2015.

== Musical style and legacy ==
Greg Prato of AllMusic wrote: "The beginnings of grindcore are often pinpointed to Napalm Death's 1987 masterpiece Scum and the early work of Carcass, but the 1989 release World Downfall by the overlooked outfit Terrorizer is often talked about in revered tones by extreme metallists worldwide. [...] Terrorizer's lone album has spawned countless imitators over the years, due to its groundbreaking merger of both speed and aggression."

== Band members ==
Current line-up

- Pete Sandoval – drums (1986–1989, 2005–2006, 2009–2023, 2023–present)
- Richie Brown – guitars (2023–present)
- Antony Hämäläinen – lead vocals (2026–present)

Previous members

- Oscar Garcia – lead vocals (1985–1989), guitars (1985–1988)
- Jesse Pintado – guitars (1985–1989, 2005–2006; his death)
- Alfred "Garvey" Estrada – bass (1986–1988)
- "Fish" – drums (1986)
- Carlos Reveles – bass (1988)
- David Vincent – bass, backing vocals (1989, 2011–2013, 2023–2026)
- Anthony Rezhawk – lead vocals (2005–2006, 2009–2013)
- Tony Norman – bass (2005–2006, 2009–2011)
- Katina Culture – guitars (2009–2013)
- Sam Molina – bass, lead vocals (2013–2023)
- Lee Harrison – guitars, backing vocals (2013–2023)
- Brian Werner – lead vocals (2023–2026)

== Discography ==
=== Studio albums ===
- World Downfall (1989)
- Darker Days Ahead (2006)
- Hordes of Zombies (2012)
- Caustic Attack (2018)

=== Split releases ===
- Terrorizer / Nausea (1987)

=== Demos ===
- Nightmares (1987)
- Demo '87 (1988)

== Bibliography ==
- Brown, Doug Robert (director) (March 19, 2020) [First published 2018]. Slave to the Grind: A Film About Grindcore (Motion picture). United States: Death by Digital – via YouTube.
- Gehkle, David E. (2023). "1989". The Scott Burns Sessions: A Life in Death Metal 1987–1997. US: Decibel Books. pp. 54–59. ISBN 979-889184521-3.
- Mudrian, Albert (2004). Choosing Death : The Improbable History of Death Metal & Grindcore (1st ed.). US: Feral House. ISBN 1-932595-04-X.
- Vincent, David; McIver, Joel (2020). I Am Morbid: Ten Lessons Learned From Extreme Metal, Outlaw Country, And The Power Of Self-Determination. Jawbone Press. ISBN 978-1911036555.
