= Terrorizer LA =

US musical group

- Origin: Los Angeles, California, U.S.
- Genres: Grindcore, deathgrind, death metal
- Years active: 2014–present
- Label: F.O.A.D. Records
- Members: Oscar Garcia; Leon del Muerte; Cosmo Reveles; Adam Houmam
- Past members: Matt Olivo; Nelson Lopez; Rick Cortez; Mike Caffell
- Website: Official website

Terrorizer LA is an American grindcore and death metal band formed in 2014. Oscar Garcia was invited by Jesse Pintado’s sister to put together a new lineup of Terrorizer (his version known as Terrorizer LA or TLA) for a festival celebrating what would have been Jesse Pintado’s 45th birthday. He asked fellow Nausea member Leon del Muerte (Murder Construct) to play guitar, and shortly afterward Cosmo Reveles, Rick Cortez (Sadistic Intent), and Mike Caffell (Dreaming Dead, Exhausted Prayer) were recruited to fill out the band. The band continues to play under the Terrorizer LA name.

== Band members ==
=== Current ===
- Oscar Garcia – vocals (2014–present)
- Leon del Muerte – guitar (2014–present)
- Carlos "Cosmo" Reveles – bass (2014–present)
- Adam Houmam – drums (2017–present)

=== Former ===
- Matt Olivo – guitar (2014)
- Nelson Lopez – drums (2014)
- Rick Cortez – guitar (2014–2015)
- Mike Caffell – drums (2014-2016)

== Discography ==
=== Compilations ===
- Before the Downfall (FOAD Records, 2015) – a collection of Terrorizer demos and unreleased material.
