= Fluid Existential Inversions =

Studio album by Intronaut
- Released: February 28, 2020
- Genre: Progressive metal, post-metal
- Length: 53:04
- Label: Metal Blade
- Producer: Josh Newell

Intronaut chronology
The Direction of Last Things (2015)	Fluid Existential Inversions (2020)

Singles from Fluid Existential Inversions
- 1. "Cubensis" Released: December 10, 2019; 2. "Pangloss" Released: January 29, 2020

Fluid Existential Inversions is the sixth studio album by American progressive metal band Intronaut. It was released February 28, 2020, through Metal Blade, their first release through the label and since leaving Century Media.

Professional ratings
Review scores
Source	Rating
Distorted Sound Magazine	8/10 stars
Medium	8/10 stars
Metal Injection	9.5/10
New Noise Magazine	4/5 stars
Tuonela Magazine	favorable

== Track listing ==
All lyrics are written by Dave Timnick; all music is composed by Intronaut & Alex Rüdinger, except where noted.

No.	Title	Music	Length
1.	"Procurement of the Victuals" (instrumental)		0:55
2.	"Cubensis"		6:53
3.	"The Cull"		6:59
4.	"Contrapasso"		6:47
5.	"Speaking of Orbs"		5:07
6.	"Tripolar"		6:28
7.	"Check Your Misfortune"		5:48
8.	"Pangloss"		6:35
9.	"Sour Everythings"	Intronaut; Alex Rüdinger; Ben Sharp	7:32
Total length:			53:04

== Personnel ==
Intronaut

- Sacha Dunable – guitar, vocals, synths
- Joe Lester – bass, synths
- Dave Timnick – guitar, vocals

Session musicians

- Alex Rüdinger - drums
- Ben Sharp - guitar on "The Cull" and "Sour Everythings"

Production

- Josh Newell – producer, engineering
- Kurt Ballou – mixing
