= Habitual Levitations (Instilling Words with Tones) =

Studio album by Intronaut
- Released: 18 March 2013 (Europe); March 19, 2013 (North America)
- Genre: Progressive metal, post-metal
- Length: 57:17
- Label: Century Media

Intronaut chronology
Valley of Smoke (2010)	Habitual Levitations (Instilling Words with Tones) (2013)	The Direction of Last Things (2015)

Habitual Levitations (Instilling Words with Tones) is the fourth studio album by American progressive metal band Intronaut. It was released on 18 March 2013 in Europe and 19 March 2013 in North America on Century Media Records, which also released their previous two albums Prehistoricisms and Valley of Smoke.

Professional ratings
Aggregate scores
Source	Rating
Metacritic	81/100
Review scores
Source	Rating
Alternative Press	4/5 stars
Blabbermouth	8/10 stars
Decibel Magazine	7/10 stars
Exclaim!	7/10 stars
Revolver	4/5 stars
Sputnikmusic	3.3/5

== Track listing ==
No.	Title	Length
1.	"Killing Birds with Stones"	8:02
2.	"The Welding"	6:00
3.	"Steps"	5:43
4.	"A Sore Sight for Eyes"	5:30
5.	"Milk Leg"	6:46
6.	"Harmonomicon"	6:31
7.	"Eventual"	6:44
8.	"Blood from a Stone"	3:04
9.	"The Way Down"	8:57

== Personnel ==
=== Intronaut ===
- Sacha Dunable – guitar, vocals
- Dave Timnick – guitar, vocals
- Danny Walker – drums
- Joe Lester – bass

=== Production ===
- John Haddad - recording engineer for drums
- Derek Donley - recording engineer for guitars, bass, and vocals
- Josh Newell - mixer
- Paul Logus - master
- David D'Andrea - layout

== Release ==
The album is available as a digital download, CD and 12 inch double LP. The track "Milk Leg" premiered on Invisible Oranges on 29 January 2013 and a video debuted on 5 February 2013. On 15 February 2013, "The Welding" was premiered on Pitchfork. On 1 March 2013, "The Way Down" premiered on the German music site, Visions.de.
