= Samantha Urbani =

American singer-songwriter

- Born: September 18, 1987 (age 39); New London, Connecticut
- Occupations: Singer, songwriter, producer
- Formerly of: Friends

Samantha Urbani (/ərˈbɑːni/ ər-BAH-nee; born September 18, 1987) is an American singer, songwriter, visual artist, filmmaker and producer. She formed the band Friends; after three years, a trio of singles, and the album Manifest! on Fat Possum records the group disbanded. Urbani went on to collaborate and tour with Dev Hynes for several years before embarking on a solo career.

== Early life ==
Urbani was born in New London, Connecticut to Robin and Bob Urbani on September 18, 1987, the younger of two siblings. The Urbani children were homeschooled by their mother, an experience Samantha recalls fondly, "She taught us about whatever we wanted to learn. We were interested in botany in second grade, so she took us on hikes around the woods to identify mushrooms. She wanted to expose us to different cultures and ideas, so when I was 10 she took us to live in Belize for a while". Her older brother, Robert "Bobby" Joseph Urbani died from complications of a congenital heart defect when she was 16. Her brother's death and death in general are common themes in her lyrics and visual art.

From a young age, Urbani showed interest in music and the visual arts, spending much of her time painting, making interactive mixed media sculpture, and singing along to the radio.

After graduating Robert E. Fitch Senior High School, Urbani took three years off to drive around the United States and travel before eventually settling in Brooklyn.

Urbani attended Eugene Lang College of Liberal Arts from 2008 through 2010, describing the world of liberal arts education as "a really expensive version of what I was already doing on my own my whole life and also more confining." Upon forming the band Friends, Urbani chose a career in music and dropped out.

== Friends ==
Friends was formed in Bushwick, Brooklyn during the Fall of 2010 by Urbani, Nikki Shapiro, Lesley Hann, Matthew Molnar, and Oliver Duncan when Hann and Duncan moved temporarily into Urbani's loft to escape an infestation of bedbugs. Urbani describes herself as a lifelong music obsessive, but was shy at first to sing in front of people or share any of the songs she had written. For some of the band's early shows, Urbani performed holding a leather panther for emotional support.

In contrast to much of the music coming out of Brooklyn at the time, Friends put an emphasis on genre defying experimentation, vocal virtuosity, and an appreciation for pop hooks. In 2012, Urbani, described the band's genre as, "Exploration pop, or ex pop. Because when I think about pop music now, the perception is that it’s all based on a formula with the ultimate goal of being commercially successful. We’re making pop music that doesn’t have any particular boundaries in the style we’re playing, the instrumentation we’re using, or the lyrical themes."

The band's shows were characterized by an unhinged eclecticism, high energy musical performance, off kilter covers, Urbani's feline intensity and gift for getting the audience involved. The band's name was chosen as a sort of meditation on the changing denotation and connotation of the word "friends," stating, "I think that word 'friends' is really interesting right now, as far as social media goes. We see it everywhere constantly, and it's become so impersonal that it's almost lost its meaning.”

The band released three singles on Lucky Number Music (UK) before releasing their debut full-length, Manifest! on Lucky Number Music (UK) and Fat Possum Records.

During the Summer of 2012, Molnar and Hann left the band. Friends released one more single, "The Way," before disbanding in 2013.

== Other ventures and collaborations ==
=== Blood Orange (2013–2014) ===
Urbani contributed to 6 out of the 11 tracks on then-boyfriend Dev Hynes's sophomore album, Cupid Deluxe. Urbani performed for the album's support tour, notably at Lollapalooza, Coachella Valley Music and Arts Festival, and on Jimmy Kimmel Live! in 2014.

The pair drew attention from the press when they took to Twitter after being assaulted by security at the main stage of Lollapalooza 2014.

Urbani also lent vocals to Hynes's soundtrack of Gia Coppola's film Palo Alto as well as to other tracks and performances of his during this period.

=== URU (2016– ) ===
In 2016, Urbani founded her own record label, URU. Urbani initially started the label as a vehicle to reissue 1981's Running Out of Time by the band Rexy.

The reissue of the album was supported by a cover compilation that included Ariel Pink and Puro Instinct, Connan Mockasin, Zoë Kravitz, Nite Jewel, and Urbani herself.

=== Other musical collaborations ===
In 2014, Urbani cofounded a queer supergroup called Slink featuring Seth Bogart of Hunx and His Punx and Cody Critcheloe of Ssion. They released one song, a gay Christmas carol, called "Pink Christmas".

The video, directed by J.J. Stratford, featured Peaches, Jesse Camp, and Angelyne, amongst other Los Angeles artists.

Urbani has contributed vocals to tracks by Twin Shadow and Doldrums, and Felicita, Danny L Harle, Sophie, and Cid Rim.

=== Video work ===
In 2014, Urbani hosted a show on Motherboard called Soundbuilders.

Additionally she has either directed or co-directed the Friends videos for "I'm His Girl", "Va Fan Gor Du".

In 2016 she released a concept video for her solo song "U Know I Know" in collaboration with MILK Studios. The video was featured as part of an accompanying make-up campaign. Urbani wrote, co-directed, cast, and designed the video.

Urbani acted in and contributed to the soundtrack of Yony Leyser's 2016 German/American feature film Desire Will Set You Free.

She also acted in the 2015 short film Vagabond with Ariel Pink.

=== Modeling and DJing ===
Urbani regularly hosts and DJs events for brands such as COS, Opening Ceremony, and Revolve Clothing as well as numerous music, art, and charity events.

She has been featured as a model in campaigns for Calvin Klein, Coach, and Xbox Kinect.

== Solo music ==
In April 2015, Urbani independently released her first track as a solo artist, "1 2 3 4". Urbani wrote the song and co-produced it with collaborator Sam Mehran and performed most of the instrumentation on the track.

Upon release, "1 2 3 4" was named Best New Track by Pitchfork and received critical praise.

In June, she released her second single "U Know I Know" which was also well received, earning her song of the week on Stereogum.

Also in June, she began performing live as a solo artist, accompanied by a full band as well as a female bodybuilder.

Urbani described her intentions as a solo artist in a 2016 interview stating, "It's different in that Friends was an isolated group of five people, whereas this is me being a vessel of integrating whoever I want at whatever times. I was playing shows last summer with a whole live band, and today I'm just using tracks and backup singers and dancers and my friend playing the guitar over it. So it's a completely different live set up. It's cool to have the freedom to do that. I love the dynamic of a band, you get to have this crazy camaraderie when you’re traveling together all the time. It’s fun for it to be a sort of ongoing conceptual project where they say 'Hey, do you wanna play a UO [showcase] at SXSW,' [and I say] 'Yes, but how am I going to make that interesting?' I don’t want it to just be a band playing on a stage. I want it to be a DIY pop show. So that’s what I’m doing right now."

In 2017, she released Policies of Power, an EP containing both previously released singles and the previously unreleased track "Time Time Time".

== Political views and performance style ==
Urbani is outspoken in interviews as well as onstage on topics of equality, race, sexuality, gender, identity politics, and the destigmatization of mental illness.

She has been an outspoken critic of police brutality, contributing to rallies and events, as well as wearing homemade clothing bearing statements against systemic police violence during performances.

Urbani has been known to regularly call out sexual harassers during her shows and to perform topless as a function of comfort. She explained her philosophy on gendered double standards in reference to a gig in Texas as follows, "It was over 100 degrees – that’s inhumane! Guys started taking their shirts off, and I remember being like, 'Fuck it, take your clothes off.' Then I [thought], 'I’m being a hypocrite. Why do I feel afraid?' Because people tell us that we’re victims, or that there are predators. Yes, that’s true, but I created this show, I created this community, let me feel safe in my own space. Taking [my] clothes off wasn’t meant to be a statement, but I knew there would be a reaction, but it was a natural thing, to be comfortable."

Urbani's performance style, solo and with Friends, is typified by a strong sense of audience participation, stating: "I make sure to get involved in the audience at every show, because I think sometimes people need that straight-forward confrontation to loosen up and dance around. Usually people react well and are having fun by the middle of the set. That's what I want people to do, to let go of the macro self-awareness."

Urbani's versatile vocal style has been compared to Black Francis and Mariah Carey.

== Personal life ==
From 2019 to 2024, Urbani was in a relationship with Nick Robinson.

== Discography ==
=== Studio Albums ===
Title	Label	Year
Showing Up	Lucky Number	2023

=== Extended plays ===
Title	Label	Year
Policies of Power	Lucky Number/URU	2017

=== Singles ===
Title	Label	Year
"1 2 3 4"	Self-released	2015
"U Know I Know"	Self-released	2015
