= Rexy (band) =

British post-punk band

Rexy was a British post-punk band. They released two albums: Running Out of Time in 1981, and Rexy II in 2020. The two members of the band, vocalist Rex Nayman and producer Vic Martin, were associated with the Blitz Kids.

The band formed when Martin, a touring keyboardist, approached Nayman about creating an album. Nayman, then a 19-year-old fashion student, agreed, despite not seeing herself as a musician. They first recorded the single 'Don’t Turn Me Away,' which received airplay on BBC Radio 1. The remainder of Running Out of Time was recorded over the next few months.

Running Out of Time received little commercial or critical attention, and Martin and Nayman decided to move on from the group. Martin went on to tour as a keyboardist with Eurythmics, Boy George, and Curiosity Killed The Cat, while Nayman completed her studies and started a career in fashion.

In 2016, Samantha Urbani launched a new record label, URU, with a reissue of Running Out of Time. Urbani's interest in their work prompted Nayman and Martin to start working on new music under the Rexy name. They released a second album, Rexy II, in 2020, before Rex Nayman died of breast cancer in September 2022.
