= The Direction of Last Things =

Studio album by Intronaut
- Released: November 13, 2015
- Genre: Progressive metal, post-metal
- Length: 46:03
- Label: Century Media
- Producer: Josh Newell

Intronaut chronology
Habitual Levitations (Instilling Words with Tones) (2013)	The Direction of Last Things (2015)	Fluid Existential Inversions (2020)

Singles from The Direction of Last Things
- 1. "Fast Worms" Released: September 16, 2015; 2. "Digital Gerrymandering" Released: October 16, 2015

The Direction of Last Things is the fifth studio album by American progressive metal band Intronaut. The album was announced in August 2015 and released through Century Media on November 13, 2015. Singles “Fast Worms” and “Digital Gerrymandering” were released in September and October of 2015, respectively. The album was recorded and produced by Josh Newell with mixing by Devin Townsend.

Speaking on the album, front man Sacha Dunable stated: "I don't care how cliché it is to say; this is our best record yet! This is Intronaut at our most technical, brutal, catchy, and straight up fearless. I haven't been this proud of an album since we recorded our first demo 10 years ago." Commenting on the recording process Dunable also said “We decided that we don’t need to spend three weeks in a studio obsessing over every minute nuance…We ended up making our best sounding record in a third of the time.”

== Reception ==
Upon release the album gained generally favorable reviews among mainstream and metal critics. Angry Metal Guy gave the album a “good” rating of 3/5, describing the album as “a decent proggy platter” that displays “technicality and impressive musicianship” an album that is “not exactly brutal or fast, but its presence helps give diversity to the music”. Crash and Ride Music said the album was “very interesting” with “a dose of metal and a pinch of progressive,” criticizing some songs for “[overstaying] their welcome”.

Professional ratings
Review scores
Source	Rating
Angry Metal Guy	3/5
Crash and Ride Music	mixed
Exclaim!	8/10
Metal Injection	favorable
The Monolith	favorable
Music Connection	9/10
New Noise Magazine	4/5 stars
Sputnikmusic	4.5/5

== Track listing ==
No.	Title	Length
1.	"Fast Worms"	6:58
2.	"Digital Gerrymandering"	8:08
3.	"The Pleasant Surprise"	4:02
4.	"The Unlikely Event of a Water Landing"	8:08
5.	"Sul Ponticello"	7:34
6.	"The Direction of Last Things"	5:18
7.	"City Hymnal"	5:55
Total length:		46:03

== Personnel ==
Intronaut

- Sacha Dunable – guitar, vocals
- Joe Lester – bass
- Danny Walker – drums, samples
- Dave Timnick – guitar, vocals, tabla, additional percussion

Production

- Josh Newell – producer, engineering
- Devin Townsend – mixing
