= Null (Intronaut EP) =

EP by Intronaut
- Released: February 28, 2006
- Recorded: April 2005
- Genre: Post-metal; Progressive metal
- Length: 28:25
- Label: Goodfellow

Intronaut chronology
Null - Demonstration Extended Play Compact Disc (2005)	Null (2006)	Void (2006)

Professional ratings
Review scores
Source	Rating
AllMusic	2.5/5 stars
Lambgoat	7/10 stars

Null is the first EP by American progressive metal band Intronaut. It was released in 2006 by Goodfellow Records.

== Track listing ==
1. "Intro" − 0:28
2. "Sores Will Weep" − 6:06
3. "Fragments of Character" − 7:06
4. "They (As in Them)" − 6:57
5. "Burning These Days" − 7:45

== Credits ==
- Leon Del Muerte – guitar, vocals
- Sacha Dunable – guitar, vocals
- Joe Lester – bass guitar
- Danny Walker – drums, sampling
- John Haddad – audio engineer, mix engineer Trench Studios
