= World Downfall =

Studio album by Terrorizer
- Released: November 13, 1989
- Recorded: May 1989
- Studio: Morrisound Recording (Tampa, Florida)
- Genre: Deathgrind; grindcore
- Length: 36:14
- Label: Earache, Relativity
- Producer: David Vincent

Terrorizer chronology
World Downfall (1989)	Darker Days Ahead (2006)

World Downfall is the debut studio album by American grindcore band Terrorizer, released on November 13, 1989, through Earache Records. It was produced by David Vincent of Morbid Angel, who also performed bass on the album, and engineered by Scott Burns at Morrisound Recording in Tampa, Florida.

== Background and recording ==
Although the album's production is credited to David Vincent, Jason Birchmeier of AllMusic stated that Scott Burns recorded and mixed the album in two days.

== Music ==
Alex Distefano of OC Weekly wrote: "World Downfall is like a dystopian musical sledgehammer of noise that destroys listeners with its abrasive punk infused death metal, and an urgent message and political themes against oppression and corruption." Jason Birchmeier of AllMusic said that "the album is a 16-track, 45-minute onslaught of prototypical grindcore à la Scum: the free-form songs, which range from about 1:30 to 3:30 each, are filled with blastbeats, growling, and solo-free riffing."

== Reception and legacy ==
Professional ratings
Review scores
Source	Rating
AllMusic	4.5/5 stars
The Encyclopedia of Popular Music	3/5 stars
Kerrang!	(1989) (2011)
Raw	2/5 stars
Rock Hard	9/10

Various publications have listed World Downfall as one of the greatest and most influential grindcore albums of all time. Ex-Fear Factory drummer Raymond Herrera and Dave Witte, ex-Discordance Axis and Municipal Waste drummer, have both cited the album as an influence.

Jason Birchmeier of AllMusic wrote: "While Terrorizer was never well known, since the band barely existed, let alone toured or promoted itself, World Downfall has grown in stature over time and is regularly cited as a grindcore classic."

== Track listing ==
Side A
No.	Title	Length
1.	"After World Obliteration"	3:30
2.	"Storm of Stress"	1:28
3.	"Fear of Napalm"	3:01
4.	"Human Prey"	2:08
5.	"Corporation Pull-In"	2:22
6.	"Strategic Warheads"	1:38
7.	"Condemned System"	1:22
8.	"Resurrection"	2:59

Side B
No.	Title	Length
9.	"Enslaved by Propaganda"	2:14
10.	"Need to Live"	1:17
11.	"Ripped to Shreds"	2:52
12.	"Injustice"	1:28
13.	"Whirlwind Struggle"	2:16
14.	"Infestation"	1:56
15.	"Dead Shall Rise"	3:06
16.	"World Downfall"	2:37
Total length:		36:14

Japanese Bonus Tracks
No.	Title	Length
1.	"Strategic Warheads" (Demo Version)	1:53
2.	"After World Obliteration" (Demo Version)	3:24
3.	"Corporate Takeover" (Demo Version)	2:44
4.	"Misled System" (Demo Version)	4:02
Total length:		48:17

== Personnel ==
Adapted from liner notes.

=== Terrorizer ===
- Oscar Garcia – lead vocals
- Jesse Pintado – guitars
- David Vincent – bass, backing vocals
- Pete Sandoval – drums

=== Production ===
- David Vincent – production
- Scott Burns – engineering

== Bibliography ==
- Brown, Doug Robert (director) (March 19, 2020) [First published 2018]. Slave to the Grind: A Film About Grindcore (Motion picture). United States: Death by Digital – via YouTube.
