= Bathtub Shitter =

Japanese grindcore band

- Origin: Osaka, Japan
- Genres: Grindcore
- Years active: 1996–present
- Labels: (S)Hit Jam; Power It Up
- Members: Masato Henmarer Morimoto; Ahmad Suhail; Daisuke Tanabe; Keisuke Sugiyama; Nikolas Caelum Nealson
- Past members: Masashi Osho Kadota; Naoki Morikawa; Susumu Horino; Katsuya Abe
- Website: bathtubshitter.com

Bathtub Shitter is a Japanese grindcore band formed in 1996. The lyrical content includes many references to nature conservation, politics and feces. Bathtub Shitter have released three albums, two compilation albums, one live album, eight singles, three split singles and two demos.

== Musical style ==
Bathtub Shitter are considered to be a grindcore band, with lyrics that explore scatological and sociopolitical themes. According to Mike Rampton of Kerrang, Bathtub Shitter "write songs about poo, war, poo, conservation, poo, shit, dung and poo." He called Bathtub Shitter the eighth "most offensive band name of all time." Additionally, the band themselves self-describe as having "one of the most infamous and lovely band names ever."

== Discography ==
=== Studio albums ===
- Wall of World Is Words (2000)
- Lifetime Shitlist (2003)
- Dance Hall Grind (2005)

=== Live albums ===
- Shitter at Salzgitter (Live in Germany 2004)

=== Compilation albums ===
- Early Yeah(s) (2005)
- Angels Save Us plus Mark a Muck (2005)

=== EPs ===
- Fertilizer
- 97+3 Shit Points
- One Fun
- Mark a Muck
- Angels Save Us
- Lifetime Shitlist EP
- Xmas
- Skate of Bulgaria
- Doodoo from Detroit

=== Split EPs ===
- Bathtub Shitter / Dudman
- Misery Index / Bathtub Shitter
- Bathtub Shitter / Japanische Kampfhörspiele

=== Demos ===
- No title (1996)
- Demo '97 (1997)
