= Darker Days Ahead =

Studio album by Terrorizer
- Released: August 22, 2006
- Recorded: 2006
- Genre: Deathgrind
- Length: 39:22
- Label: Century Media
- Producer: Juan "Punchy" Gonzalez

Terrorizer chronology
World Downfall (1989)	Darker Days Ahead (2006)	Hordes of Zombies (2012)

Professional ratings
Review scores
Source	Rating
AllMusic	3/5 stars
Blabbermouth.net	6.5/10
Chronicles of Chaos	7/10
Collector's Guide to Heavy Metal	8/10
Metal.de	6/10
Rock Hard	8.5/10
Rock Sound	7/10

Darker Days Ahead is the second album by American deathgrind band Terrorizer. It was released on August 22, 2006, by Century Media, seventeen years after their 1989 debut World Downfall. Darker Days Ahead is Terrorizer's final album recorded with guitarist Jesse Pintado, who died five days after its release due to liver failure.

== Track listing ==
All tracks are written by Anthony Rezhawk, Jesse Pintado and Pete Sandoval, unless noted otherwise

No.	Title	Writer(s)	Length
1.	"Inevitable" (Intro)	Pintado, Sandoval	1:03
2.	"Darker Days Ahead"	Tony Norman, Rezhawk, Sandoval	3:46
3.	"Crematorium"		3:54
4.	"Fallout"		3:48
5.	"Doomed Forever"		3:23
6.	"Mayhem"		3:57
7.	"Blind Army"		3:06
8.	"Nightmare"		3:42
9.	"Legacy of Brutality"		2:25
10.	"Dead Shall Rise V.06"		3:32
11.	"Victim of Greed"		4:11
12.	"Ghost Train" (Outro)	Sandoval	2:34
Total length:			39:22

Japanese bonus track
No.	Title	Length
1.	"Doomed Forever" (Demo Version)	3:13
Total length:		42:35

== Personnel ==
=== Terrorizer ===
- Anthony Rezhawk – vocals
- Jesse Pintado – guitars
- Tony Norman – bass
- Pete Sandoval – drums, piano ("Ghost Train")

=== Production ===
- Juan "Punchy" Gonzalez – production, engineering, mixing, mastering
