= Unsilent Death =

Studio album by Nails
- Released: 12th March 2010
- Recorded: December 27, 2009 – January 2, 2010
- Genres: Powerviolence, grindcore
- Length: 13:52
- Labels: Six Feet Under, Southern Lord
- Producer: Kurt Ballou

Nails chronology
Obscene Humanity 12" (2009)	Unsilent Death (2010)	Abandon All Life (2013)

Professional ratings
Review scores
Source	Rating
Allmusic	3.5/5 stars

Unsilent Death is the debut studio album by American hardcore punk band Nails, released in March 2010 by Streetcleaner Records/Six Feet Under Records. It was rereleased by Southern Lord Records.

The record was re-released in November 27, 2020 for its ten-year anniversary. The release features the original ten songs, three tracks from their Obscene Humanity 7" EP, and two newly-unveiled tracks from the Unsilent Death sessions.

== Track listing ==
No.	Title	Length
1.	"Conform"	0:31
2.	"Scum Will Rise"	1:03
3.	"Your God"	0:32
4.	"Suffering Soul"	1:30
5.	"Unsilent Death"	2:41
6.	"Traitor"	0:28
7.	"I Will Not Follow"	1:26
8.	"No Servant"	0:59
9.	"Scapegoat"	0:55
10.	"Depths"	3:47
Total length:		13:52

=== Ten-year anniversary re-release bonus tracks ===
No.	Title	Length
11.	"Leech"	1:00
12.	"Enemy"	1:20
13.	"Confront Them"	1:22
14.	"Obscene Humanity"	1:44
15.	"Lies"	3:32
Total length:		22:50

== Personnel ==
Nails

- John Gianelli - bass
- Taylor Young - drums
- Todd Jones - vocals, guitars

Production

- Billy Benson - front cover art
- Kurt Ballou - engineering, mixing
- Scott Magrath - layout
- Alan Douches - mastering
