= Intronaut =

American progressive metal band

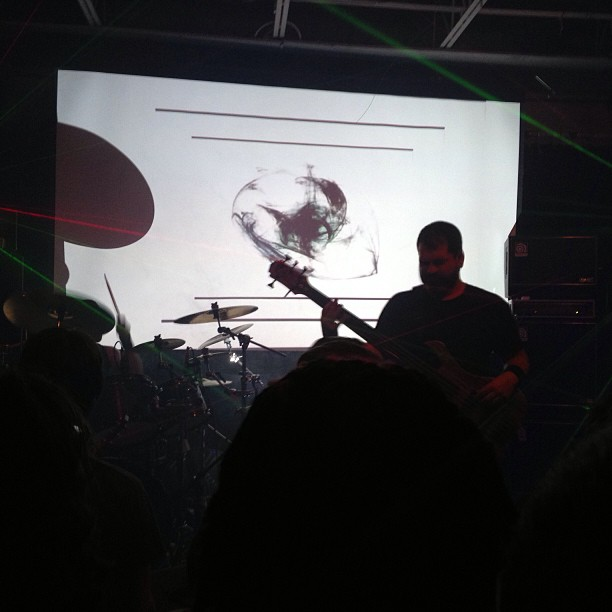
- Intronaut live in 2013

Background information
- Origin: Los Angeles, California, U.S.
- Genres: Progressive metal, post-metal, sludge metal
- Years active: 2004–present
- Labels: Century Media, Translation Loss, Goodfellow, Lifeforce, Metal Blade
- Members: Sacha Dunable; Dave Timnick; Joe Lester
- Website: metalblade.com/intronaut/

Intronaut is an American progressive metal band from Los Angeles, California, that incorporates complex polyrhythms, progressive rock, and jazz.

== History ==
Intronaut formed in 2004, and their initial line-up included guitarist/vocalist Sacha Dunable, guitarist/vocalist Leon del Muerte, drummer Danny Walker, and bassist Joe Lester.

In 2005, Intronaut released a four-track demo entitled Null – Demonstration Extended Play Compact Disc. They signed to Goodfellow Records in October and recorded Void in early April 2006 at Shiva Industries in Santa Ana, California with producer John Haddad. Void represented the first songwriting effort featuring the band as a whole, as Dunable had written much of the material for Null prior to the other members joining the band.

In August 2007, guitarist/vocalist Leon del Muerte left the band to focus on Murder Construct and was replaced by Dave Timnick. Shortly thereafter Intronaut toured Europe for the first time in support of The Ocean.

In January 2008, the band announced that they had signed a worldwide deal with Century Media Records and completed their next album, Prehistoricisms. As the album was the first without del Muerte - whom the band described as their "metal riff guy" - Prehistoricisms took on a more rhythmic quality that was exemplified by the double-drummer ending of "Any Port". They also recorded a cover of Eyehategod's "Dixie Whiskey" for Century Media's twentieth anniversary covers album.

In April 2009, Intronaut toured with Kylesa and Mastodon. Later that year, in October 2009, Intronaut played several shows in Kolkata and Pragati Maidan, Delhi for the Great Indian Rock Festival XIII.

In the summer of 2010, Intronaut released their third full-length album, Valley of Smoke, featuring a guest appearance from Justin Chancellor from Tool. The album was characterized by increased use of melody and pitched singing, as well as more concise songs. In late 2010, Intronaut opened for Cynic on the "Re-Traced/Re-Focused Tour" of North America. Shortly thereafter, Intronaut completed another North American tour opening for Helmet.

In mid-2011, Intronaut toured Europe with The Ocean and Red Fang, then toured North America with Animals as Leaders, Dead Letter Circus, and Last Chance to Reason, and then toured Europe again with Ghost Brigade and A Storm of Light.

In early 2012, Intronaut supported Tool on the first leg of their North American tour. After the tour, they commenced writing for their fourth studio album, Habitual Levitations (Instilling Words with Tones), which was released on March 19, 2013. In April 2014 they supported TesseracT in their North American tour, as well as serving as the live backing band for one man progressive outfit Cloudkicker's live debut.

In 2015, the band released their fifth album, "The Direction of Last Things".

In 2018, Intronaut fired their drummer, Danny Walker, following allegations of domestic abuse.

In 2020, after 5 years without new music, the band entered the studio with Alex Rüdinger performing as a session drummer to fill the vacant spot left by Danny. The album that was born of this is "Fluid Existential Inversions", which is Intronaut’s sixth full length studio album.

== Musical style ==
Intronaut's sound is influenced by a wide variety of genres, with songs frequently transitioning from heavy distorted portions into ambient jazz-infused soundscapes. The guitar work is based around distorted and sometimes fuzzed tones. Guitar parts include anything from driving head-banging riffs to dissonant ones. Various metal genres are represented in Intronaut's songs. These genres include heavy metal, stoner metal, post-metal, and sludge metal. Bass guitar is a prominent feature of Intronaut's sound, often serving as the primary melodic component of certain riffs. The use of fretless bass guitars on numerous songs adds to the prominence of bass guitar in Intronaut's songs and reflects the influence of jazz, a genre in which fretless bass guitar is common, on the band's sound. Intronaut's songs frequently shift between intense metal sections and jazz-inspired ambient sections. These jazz-inspired passages employ jazz chord shapes and tones with heavy reverb to create ethereal breaks from their more intense riffs. Vocal tones include screaming, growling, and melodic singing, often featuring elaborate harmonies. The drum performances focuses heavily on polymeters and polyrhythms, typical of the jazz, progressive, and various metal genres that influence Intronaut's sound. Intronaut often incorporate more experimental, psychedelic passages into their songs as well, utilizing unique instruments such as sitars and hand percussion.

Intronaut have frequently been compared to other progressive oriented sludge metal acts such as Mastodon and Baroness, though the band members have denied that the latter was ever a significant influence on their sound. A marked stylistic change came when clean vocals were introduced on their album Valley of Smoke. Intronaut's clean vocals, consisting largely of harmonisations between guitarist/vocalists Dunable and Timnick, has frequently been compared to Alice in Chains. Habitual Levitations used clean vocals almost exclusively and was also largely devoid of the band's earlier extreme metal influences, drawing comparisons to acts such as Deftones, Hum, Oceansize, Tool, and Alice in Chains. The release of the album The Direction of Last Things marked the return of more aggressive vocal styles and other extreme metal elements, while retaining the more melodic sensibilities of their previous two albums. The album also experimented with elements of math rock, particularly on "In the Unlikely Event of a Water Landing".

== Members ==
Current

- Sacha Dunable – guitar, vocals (2004–present)
- Joe Lester – bass (2004–present)
- Dave Timnick – guitar, vocals, tabla, additional percussion (2007–present)

Former

- Leon del Muerte – guitar, vocals (2004–2007)
- Danny Walker – drums, samples (2004–2018)

Session musicians

- Alex Rudinger – drums (2019)

== Discography ==
Intronaut discography
- Studio albums: 6
- Extended plays: 3

=== Studio albums ===
List of studio albums, with selected chart positions
Year	Album details	Peak chart positions			
Year	Album details	US Indie.	US Rock	US Hard Rock	US Heat.
2006	Void: Released: August 23, 2006; Label: Goodfellow	—	—	—	—
2008	Prehistoricisms: Released: September 16, 2008; Label: Century Media	—	—	—	—
2010	Valley of Smoke: Released: October 12, 2010; Label: Century Media	—	—	—	20
2013	Habitual Levitations (Instilling Words with Tones): Released: March 19, 2013; Label: Century Media	37	—	14	10
2015	The Direction of Last Things: Released: November 13, 2015; Label: Century Media	15	29	7	3
2020	Fluid Existential Inversions: Released: February 28, 2020; Label: Metal Blade	—	—	—	—
"—" denotes a recording that did not chart or was not released in that territory.

=== EPs ===
- Null - Demonstration Extended Play Compact Disc (2005, self-released)
- Null (2006, Goodfellow)
- The Challenger (2007, Translation Loss)

=== Singles/music videos ===
- "Australopithecus" (2008)
- "Elegy" (2010)
- "Sunderance" (2011)
- "Milk Leg" (2013)
- "Harmonomicon" (2013)
- "Fast Worms" (2015)
- "Sul Ponticello" (2016)
- "Cubensis" (2019)
- "Speaking of Orbs" (2020)

=== Appeared on ===
- Like Black Holes in the Sky: A Tribute to Syd Barrett (2008, Dwell) "Arnold Layne"
- Covering 20 Years of Extremes (2009, Century Media) "Dixie Whiskey"
