= Valley of Smoke =

Studio album by Intronaut
- Released: October 12, 2010
- Genre: Progressive metal, post-metal
- Length: 49:37; 53:49 (European edition)
- Label: Century Media
- Producer: Josh Newell

Intronaut chronology
Prehistoricisms (2008)	Valley of Smoke (2010)	Habitual Levitations (Instilling Words with Tones) (2013)

Valley of Smoke is the third studio album by American progressive metal band Intronaut. It was released in North America on October 12, 2010 on Century Media Records, who also released their previous album Prehistoricisms. The album was released in Europe with exclusive bonus track "Vernon" on November 22, 2010.

Professional ratings
Review scores
Source	Rating
About.com	4.5/5 stars
Allmusic	4/5 stars
Chronicles of Chaos	8.5/10
Exclaim.ca	(positive)
Rock Sound	8/10

== Track listing ==
No.	Title	Length
1.	"Elegy"	6:36
2.	"Above"	6:10
3.	"Miasma"	7:51
4.	"Sunderance"	3:29
5.	"Core Relations"	6:39
6.	"Below"	4:22
7.	"Valley of Smoke" (Featuring Justin Chancellor)	8:34
8.	"Past Tense"	5:56
9.	"Vernon" (European bonus track)	4:12

== Personnel ==
=== Intronaut ===
- Sacha Dunable – guitar, vocals
- Dave Timnick – guitar, vocals, percussion
- Danny Walker – drums
- Joe Lester – bass

=== Guest musicians ===
- Justin Chancellor - second bass on "Valley of Smoke"

=== Production ===
- Josh Newell - producer
