= Nails (band) =

American hardcore punk band

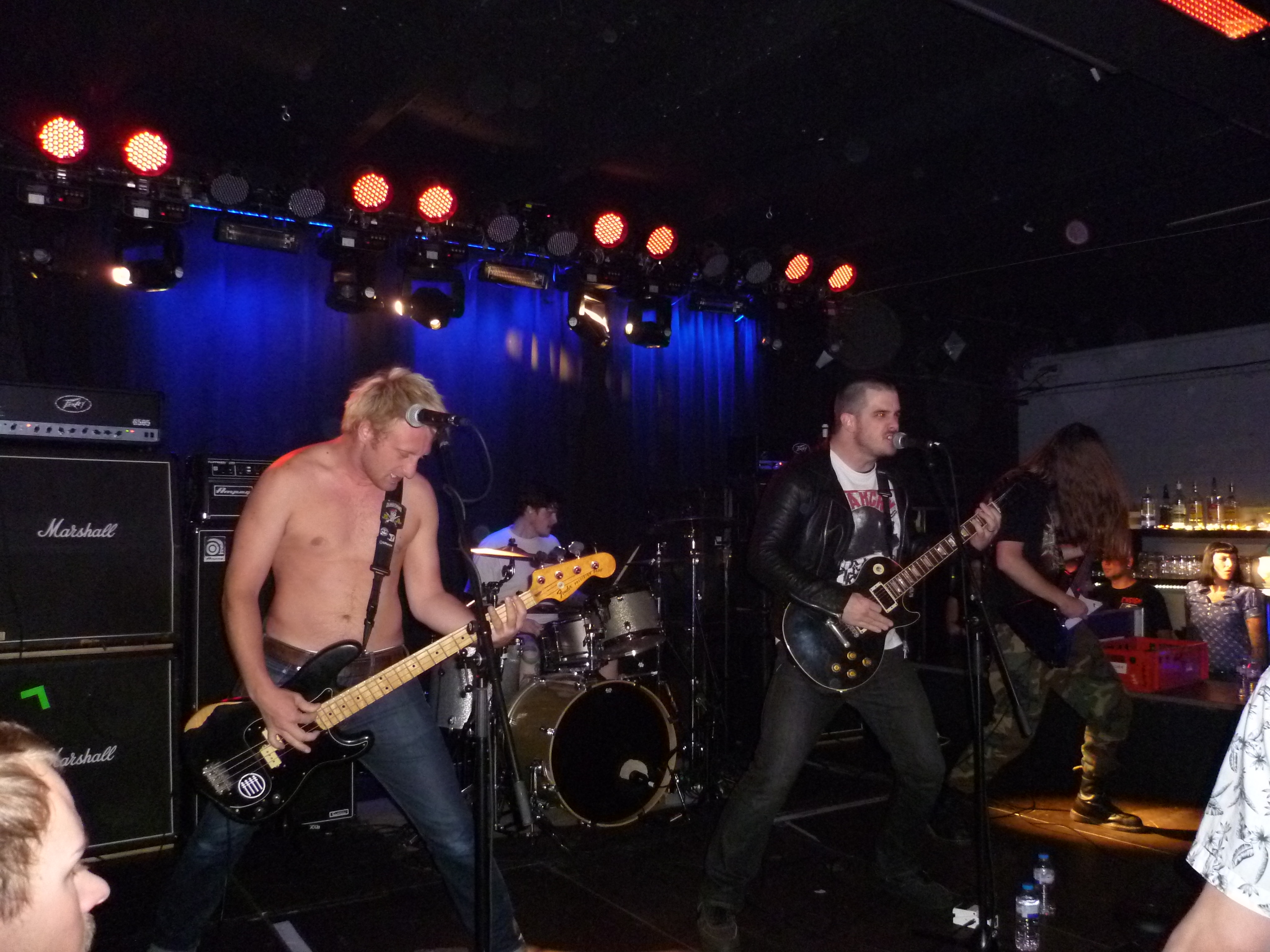
- Nails performing in 2014

Background information
- Origin: Oxnard, California, U.S.
- Genres: Grindcore; powerviolence; crust punk; hardcore punk
- Years active: 2007–present
- Labels: Closed Casket Activities; Southern Lord; Six Feet Under; Streetcleaner; Nuclear Blast
- Members: Todd Jones; Andrew Solis; Carlos Cruz
- Past members: John Gianelli; Tom Hogan; Taylor Young; Andrew Saba; Leon del Muerte; Shelby Lermo
- Website: nailssl.bandcamp.com

Nails (stylized in all caps as NAILS) is an American hardcore punk band from Oxnard, California. The group was formed in 2007 by frontman Todd Jones, formerly the guitarist of Terror and Carry On, along with bassist John Gianelli and later joined by drummer Taylor Young of Disgrace, Twitching Tongues, etc. They released their debut EP Obscene Humanity in 2009, followed by the studio albums Unsilent Death (2010), Abandon All Life (2013), You Will Never Be One of Us (2016), a split EP with Full of Hell, I Don't Want to Know You (2019), an EP featuring Max Cavalera of Soulfly, Cavalera Conspiracy, and Every Bridge Burning (2024).

== History ==
The band formed in 2007. They have since released four full-length albums, and three EPs.

On July 25, 2016, the band abruptly canceled a European tour, with promoters claiming the band were on a hiatus and "had no plans to play live or record again." This also led to canceling their appearance at Ozzfest Meets Knotfest. Todd Jones later stated that the band had never taken a hiatus. In December 2016, the band returned by playing at The Power of the Riff festival and releasing a split 7-inch with Full of Hell.

On November 30, 2020, following the announcement of the 10th anniversary reissue of Unsilent Death, Young announced that he quit the band in early Spring. The day after, John Gianelli also confirmed his departure from the band. From this point, Todd Jones is the only member of the band.

After close to 3 years of silence from Jones, the band's Instagram posted a picture of Jones and Kurt Ballou in God City Studios. The photo was captioned, "New NAILS LP coming Summer 2024 via @nuclearblastrecords engineered by Kurt Ballou. Thanks for sticking with us. Info forthcoming. Love you all.". On June 10, 2024, the band released the single "Imposing Will". This coincided with the announcement that their fourth studio album would be titled Every Bridge Burning, and that their lineup now included guitarist Shelby Lermo of Ulthar, drummer Carlos Cruz of Warbringer and bassist Andrew Solis of Despise You and Apparition. They released their fourth album, Every Bridge Burning, on August 30th, 2024.

== Musical style ==
Critics have categorized Nails' music as grindcore, powerviolence, crust punk, and hardcore punk. In a review of Abandon All Life, Pitchfork wrote that "Nails cram their brief but constantly shifting tracks with a chaotic, complex blend of hardcore punk, D-beat, grindcore, powerviolence, and death metal."

The band have cited influences including Agnostic Front, Discharge, Slayer, Crossed Out and Sheer Terror. In a 2013 interview for Invisible Oranges, Todd Jones named crust punk, death metal, and Japanese hardcore as the band's foremost musical influences.

== Members ==
Current members

- Todd Jones – lead vocals, guitar (2009–present)
- Andrew Solis – bass (2024–present)
- Carlos Cruz – drums (2024–present)

Touring musicians

- Martin Stewart – guitar (2025–present)

Former members

- John Gianelli – bass, backing vocals (2009–2020)
- Tom Hogan – drums (2009)
- Taylor Young – drums (2009–2020)
- Andrew Saba – guitar (2012–2015)
- Leon del Muerte – guitar, backing vocals (2017–2019)
- Shelby Lermo – guitar (2024–2026)

Former touring musicians

- Jon Westbrook – bass (2009)
- Phil Sgrosso – guitar (2016)

== Discography ==
Studio albums

- Unsilent Death (2010)
- Abandon All Life (2013)
- You Will Never Be One of Us (2016)
- Every Bridge Burning (2024)

Singles and EPs

- Obscene Humanity 12-inch (2009), 7-inch (2012)
- Two Song Flexi 7-inch (2015)
- I Don't Want to Know You 7-inch (2019)
- Fear Based Life 7-inch (2026)

Split releases

- Nails / Skin Like Iron split 7-inch (2012)
- Nails / Full of Hell split 7-inch (2016)
