= Manifest! =

Studio album by Friends
- Released: June 4, 2012
- Recorded: Summer 2011 – Spring 2012
- Genres: Indie pop; indie rock
- Length: 38:33
- Label: Fat Possum/Lucky Number
- Producers: Samantha Urbani; Oliver Duncan; Lesley Hann; Matthew Molnar; Nikki Shapiro

Manifest! is the only album from American band Friends, released in June 2012 on the Fat Possum label in the United States and on the Lucky Number label in Europe.

== Recording and release ==
The album was recorded between summer 2011 and spring 2012 and produced by the band with the assistance of engineer Daniel Schlett at Strange Weather studios in Brooklyn. The tracks were mixed by the band and Schlett with the exception of "Mind Control" which was mixed by the band and Paul Epworth. The album includes two tracks that were released as singles in 2011, "I'm His Girl" and "Friend Crush", as well as third single "Mind Control".

The album was released on June 4, 2012, outside the United States and on June 5 in the US. A limited special edition exclusive to Rough Trade stores in the UK included a second disc with five extra tracks.

== Cover art ==
The album's cover art was designed by singer Samantha Urbani and Erez Avissar, and features a stereoscopic image of the band.

== Reception ==
Professional ratings
Review scores
Source	Rating
AllMusic	4/5 stars
BBC	Positive
Boston Phoenix	4/5 stars
The Guardian	3/5 stars
The List	3/5 stars
NME	8/10 stars
Pitchfork	5.2/10
Rolling Stone	3.5/5 stars
Spin Magazine	6/10

Michael Hann of The Guardian commented on the album's "pick'n'mix approach to New York's musical history".

The album was described in a review for the BBC by Nick Levine as "generally impressive".

The album was positively received by the NME, with Lisa Wright rating it 8/10 and describing it as "louche, cool, and wickedly and exuberantly playful". AllMusic reviewer Tim Sendra called the album "a loose-limbed, dancefloor-filling jam with songs that are tropically inspired, sweet-spirited, and fun" and noted the "unusual and memorable" lyrics. The List's Jonny Ensall described Manifest! as an "insidiously hooky album". Liz Pelly, writing in The Boston Phoenix, called it "the best pop album of the summer". Rolling Stone gave it a 3.5 star rating.

== Track listing ==
All songs written and composed by Samatha Urbani, Oliver Duncan, Lesley Hann, Matthew Molnar, and Nikki Shapiro.

No.	Title	Length
1.	"Friend Crush"	3:05
2.	"Sorry"	3:53
3.	"Home"	2:52
4.	"A Thing Like This"	3:00
5.	"A Light"	2:12
6.	"Ideas on Ghosts"	3:30
7.	"Ruins"	2:16
8.	"I'm His Girl"	2:53
9.	"Proud/Ashamed"	3:44
10.	"Stay Dreaming"	4:07
11.	"Va Fan Gör Du"	2:21
12.	"Mind Control"	4:46

Rough Trade bonus CD

1. "Perpetual Crush"
2. "Feelin Dank"
3. "My Boo"
4. "I'm His Girl (Arthur Baker Remix)"
5. "Friend Crush (Jake Bullit Mix)"

== Credits ==
Friends:

- Samantha Urbani
- Oliver Duncan
- Lesley Hann
- Matthew Molnar
- Nikki Shapiro

with

- Jessica Collins - vocals
- Daniel Schlett - vocals, engineering

== Chart positions ==
Manifest! peaked at number 100 in the UK Albums Chart in June 2012.
