= Wiley Reed =

- Also known as: Moses 'Turkey Slap' Washington
- Born: Wiley Dean Reed; 5 January 1944; Jacksonville, Florida, United States
- Died: 7 October 2012 (aged 68) Brisbane, Queensland, Australia
- Genres: Blues
- Website: http://wileyreed.com.au

Wiley Dean Reed (5 January 1944 – 7 October 2012) was an Australian-based African-American blues musician and songwriter, who sang and accompanied himself on the piano.

== Biography ==
Born in Jacksonville, Florida on 5 January 1944, Reed began singing in the local church choir at the age of nine, and was already an accomplished musician in his native United States before he arrived in Australia in 1967. He toured extensively throughout the United States, Australia and Europe, and made three trips to Vietnam (1967, 1968, 1969) to entertain troops.

Reed began his career in Australia at the Two Eyes Club where he performed with fellow blues artists Billy Thorpe, Phil Manning, Doug Parkinson and Jeff St John.

He became known for his deep soulful style and his generosity, helping many musicians.

His last recording titled Straight from the Heart (2003) won three 'Sunnie' awards for Best Male Vocalist, Best Blues Album and Best Male Vocalist at the Gold Coast International Jazz and Blues Festival.

In November 2010, Reed collaborated with a new lineup of Brisbane musicians to create and record original material under the pseudonym Moses 'Turkey Slap' Washington, a fictional Delta bluesman who sings blues-rock with comedic lyrics. This was slated for release in 2011.

In 2012, Reed and his band opened the 2012 Broadbeach Blues Festival and was a highlight act on the main stage at the 2012 Noosa Jazz Festival.

Reed died in hospital due to complications from an earlier fall on 7 October 2012 in Brisbane, Australia.
