= Cloudkicker =

American post-rock band

- Origin: Columbus, Ohio, U.S.
- Genres: Post-rock; post-metal; progressive metal
- Years active: 2005–present
- Labels: Independent releases, Century Media
- Members: Ben Sharp

Cloudkicker is an American post-rock/post-metal musical project based in Columbus, Ohio, created by guitarist Ben Sharp. Sharp, a commercial airline pilot, does not pursue Cloudkicker as a full-time project; he releases his music as "pay what you want" under the Creative Commons license through Bandcamp.

Cloudkicker - Let Yourself Be Huge

Sharp composes, records and engineers all his music by himself; while he originally intended a studio-only project due to his distaste for touring, Sharp performed a short tour in 2014 with Intronaut (who acted as his backing band) and Tesseract.

Sharp announced a new side project with Gospel's Vinny Roseboom named The Supervoid Choral Ensemble in 2023.

== Discography ==
=== Albums ===
- 2005: myspace.com/musicistight (Compilation)
- 2008: The Discovery
- 2010: Beacons
- 2011: Let Yourself Be Huge
- 2011: Loop
- 2012: Fade
- 2013: Subsume
- 2014: Live with Intronaut (Century Media)
- 2015: Woum
- 2019: Unending
- 2020: Loop (2020)
- 2020: Solitude

=== EPs & Singles ===
- 2008: The Map Is Not the Territory
- 2009: Portmanteau
- 2009: ]]][[[
- 2010: A New Heavenly Body (]]][[[ remixed and remastered)
- 2013: Hello
- 2014: Little Histories
- 2025: Things You Can't Change

Music Videos

- Subsume Part 1 (Live with Intronaut) (2014)
- "Seriosity (Live with Intronaut)" (2014)
- "Push it way up! (Live with Intronaut) " (2014)
