= Abandon All Life =

Studio album by Nails
- Released: 28 March 2013
- Recorded: December 27, 2012 – January 2, 2013
- Studio: GodCity Recording (Salem)
- Genre: Grindcore; powerviolence; death metal; D-beat
- Length: 17:14
- Label: Southern Lord
- Producer: Kurt Ballou

Nails chronology
Unsilent Death (2010)	Abandon All Life (2013)	You Will Never Be One of Us (2016)

Professional ratings
Aggregate scores
Source	Rating
Metacritic	80/100
Review scores
Source	Rating
AllMusic	4/5 stars
The Austin Chronicle	3/4 stars
Chronicles of Chaos	8/10
Drowned in Sound	7/10
Metal Injection	8/10
Pitchfork	8.0/10
PopMatters	8/10
Punknews.org	4/5 stars
Q	3/5 stars
Sputnikmusic	4.0/5

Abandon All Life is the second full-length studio album by American hardcore punk band Nails. The album was released on 28 March 2013 through Southern Lord Records to positive reviews with an aggregated score of 80/100 on Metacritic.

== Track listing ==
No.	Title	Length
1.	"In Exodus"	1:17
2.	"Tyrant"	0:42
3.	"Absolute Control"	0:42
4.	"God's Cold Hands"	1:58
5.	"Wide Open Wound"	3:36
6.	"Abandon All Life"	1:20
7.	"No Surrender"	0:54
8.	"Pariah"	1:01
9.	"Cry Wolf"	0:23
10.	"Suum Cuique"	5:21
Total length:		17:14

== Personnel ==
Nails

- John Gianelli - bass
- Taylor Young - drums
- Todd Jones - vocals, guitars

Session

- Andy Saba - lead guitar

Production

- Farron Kerzner - artwork
- Kurt Ballou - producer, engineering, mixing
- Scott Magrath - layout, design
- Brad Boatright - mastering
