= Leon del Muerte =

American guitarist and vocalist (born 1977)

Leon del Muerte (born 1977) is a musician living in Portland, Oregon, USA. He is a guitarist, a vocalist, and also a founding member of the band Murder Construct. He is a guitarist in Terrorizer LA, Lightbreaker, and Nightmarer, vocalist in Impaled, and he was previously involved with the bands Nails, Exhumed, Nausea LA, Intronaut, Phobia, and Artificium Sanguis.

He is also the creator of 3 fonts; GoreFont-II, Solstice Of Suffering, and Incantation under the name Grave Tech.

== Discography ==
=== Demos ===
- Infanticide - Fetal Remains (demo cassette), 1993
- Impaled - From Here to Colostomy (demo cassette), 1999
- Artificium Sanguis - Ye Olde Demo Taype (demo CD), 2003
- Intronaut - Null (Demo CD), 2005

=== Albums ===
- Impaled - The Dead Shall Dead Remain (album CD), 2000 Necropolis Records
- Exhumed - Garbage Daze Re-Regurgitated (album CD), 2005 Listenable Records
- Intronaut - Void (album CD), 2006 Goodfellow Records
- Phobia - 22 Random Acts of Violence (album CD), 2008 Willowtip
- D.I.S. (Destroyed In Seconds) - Critical Failure (album CD), 2010 Deep Six Records
- Exhumed - All Guts, No Glory (album CD), 2011 Relapse Records
- Murder Construct - Results (album CD), 2012 Relapse Records
- Impaled - The Dead Still Dead Remain (album CD), 2013 Willowtip
- Nausea (LA) - Condemned to the System (album CD), 2014 Willowtip
- Phobia - Lifeless God (album CD), 2017 Willowtip
- Lightbreaker - The Annihilation of the Annealds (album CD), 2023 Self-released

=== EPs ===
- Pale Existence / Exhumed - Blood & Alcohol (7" split), 1996
- Impaled / Cephalic Carnage (7" split), 1999
- Impaled / Engorged (7" split), 2000
- Impaled - Choice Cuts (Extended Play CD), 2001 Necropolis Records
- Black Ops / Leng Tch'e - "Pain is Weakness Leaving the Body" (7" split)
- Intronaut - Null: Extended Play Compact Disc (Extended Play CD), 2005 Goodfellow Records
- Exhumed / Ingrowing - Something Sickened This Way Comes (7" split), Obscene Productions
- Intronaut - The Challenger (Extended Play CD), 2007 Goodfellow Records
- Phobia / Extinction of Mankind - Fearing the Dissolve of Humanity (Extended Play CD), 2008 Agipunk
- Phobia / Gadget (7" split), 2010 Power It Up
- Murder Construct - s/t (Extended Play CD), 2010 Relapse Records
- Nails - I Don't Want to Know You/Endless Resistance (7" record), 2019 Nuclear Blast Records

=== Compilations ===
- Exhumed - Chords of Chaos (CD), 1997
- Impaled - Requiems Of Revulsion: A Tribute To Carcass (CD), 2001
- Exhumed - Platters of Splatter: A Cyclopedic Symposium Of Execrable Errata And Abhorrent Apocraphya 1992-2002 (CD), 2004 Relapse Records
- Murder Construct - Tribute to Disrupt (CD), 2014

=== Recorded guest appearances ===
- American Heritage - Sedentary (guest bass guitar) 2011
- Aspirate Coma - Serene Transcendence through Corporal Disfigurement (guest vocals) 2020
- Bent Sea - Instagrind (guitar solo/vocals) 2020
- Cartilage - The Deader the Better (guest guitar solo) 2022
- Contrition - Broken Mortal Coil (guest guitar solo) 2021
- Daggra - Setsuna (guest vocals) 2018
- Dekapitator - We Will Destroy... You Will Obey!!! (guest vocals) 1999
- Evil Entourage - Into the Void (guest guitar solo) 2018
- Exhumed - In the Name of Gore (guest vocals) 1996
- Exhumed - Slaughtercult (guest vocals) 2000
- Houkago Grind Time - Bakyunsified (Moe to the Gore) (guest guitar solo) 2020
- I Klatus - Kether (guest vocals, guitar) 2013
- Merrow - Nasum EP (guest vocals) 2021
- Merrow - Mojave Repressions (guest vocals) 2022
- Morbosidad - Morbosidad (guest vocals) 2000
- Negative Vortex - Tomb Absolute (guest guitar solos) 2023
- Zous - No Ground to Give (guest guitar solo) 2022

== Miscellaneous ==
=== Videos ===
- Murder Construct - Red All Over
- Murder Construct - The Next Life
- Dreaming Dead - Overlord
- Nails - I Don't Want to Know You
- Negative Vortex - Tomb Absolute

=== Live guest appearances ===
- Dreaming Dead - bass guitar
- Exhumed - bass guitar
- Nails (band) - guitar
