= Diluvia =

Studio album by Freelance Whales
- Released: October 9, 2012
- Genres: Indie pop, indie folk, folktronica, indietronica
- Labels: Mom + Pop Music, Frenchkiss

Freelance Whales chronology
Weathervanes (2009)	Diluvia (2012)

Singles from Diluvia
- 1. "Locked Out" Released: July 18, 2012; 2. "Spitting Image"

Professional ratings
Aggregate scores
Source	Rating
AnyDecentMusic?	6.8/10
Metacritic	70/100
Review scores
Source	Rating
AllMusic	3/5 stars
Alternative Press	3/5 stars
Austin Chronicle	3/5 stars
The A.V. Club	A−
Blurt	8/10 stars
Consequence of Sound	2.5/5 stars
Filter	77%
Paste	7.5/10
PopMatters	6/10 stars
Pretty Much Amazing	B+

Diluvia is the second studio album by the American indie pop group Freelance Whales. The album was released on October 9, 2012, via Mom + Pop Music.

== Track listing ==
All songs by Freelance Whales.

Diluvia track listing
No.	Title	Length
1.	"Aeolus"	3:37
2.	"Land Features"	3:57
3.	"Follow Through"	5:11
4.	"Spitting Image"	4:01
5.	"Locked Out"	5:18
6.	"Dig Into Waves"	3:49
7.	"Red Star"	5:02
8.	"Winter Seeds"	5:08
9.	"The Nothing"	4:36
10.	"DNA Bank"	7:40
11.	"Emergence Exit"	4:22

== Personnel ==
Freelance Whales

- Judah Dadone – lead vocals, banjo, guitar, synthesizer, piano, organ, bass
- Chuck Criss – banjo, bass, guitar, glockenspiel, harmonium, piano, organ, synthesizer, harmonies
- Kevin Read – guitar, piano, organ, synthesizer, glockenspiel, banjo, mandolin, harmonies
- Doris Cellar – bass, harmonium, glockenspiel, synthesizer, harmonies, lead vocal on "Spitting Image"
- Jacob Hyman – drums, percussion, harmonies
