= Prehistoricisms =

Studio album by Intronaut
- Released: September 16, 2008
- Genre: Progressive metal, post-metal
- Length: 53:33
- Label: Century Media

Intronaut chronology
Void (2006)	Prehistoricisms (2008)	Valley of Smoke (2010)

Professional ratings
Review scores
Source	Rating
About.com	3.5/5 stars
Allmusic	4/5 stars
Exclaim.ca	(positive)
Pitchfork	7.0/10

Prehistoricisms is the second studio album by American progressive metal band Intronaut. It was released on September 16, 2008 by Century Media Records, to positive reviews. It is the first album to feature guitarist Dave Timnick, as the band moves towards a jazzier, more progressive sound.

== Track listing ==
No.	Title	Length
1.	"Primordial Soup"	1:26
2.	"The Literal Black Cloud"	5:29
3.	"Cavernous Den of Shame"	4:13
4.	"Prehistoricisms"	6:29
5.	"Any Port"	7:31
6.	"Sundial"	7:33
7.	"Australopithecus"	4:32
8.	"The Reptilian Brain"	16:20
Total length:		53:32

== Personnel ==
- Sacha Dunable − guitar, vocals
- Dave Timnick − guitar
- Joe Lester − bass
- Danny Walker − drums, samples
