= Hordes of Zombies =

Studio album by Terrorizer
- Released: February 24, 2012
- Recorded: 2011
- Genre: Deathgrind
- Length: 38:07
- Label: Season of Mist
- Producer: Anthony Rezhawk

Terrorizer chronology
Darker Days Ahead (2006)	Hordes of Zombies (2012)	Caustic Attack (2018)

Professional ratings
Review scores
Source	Rating
Sputnikmusic	2/5 stars
Stereo Killer	4/5 stars
Sea of Tranquility	3/5 stars

Hordes of Zombies is the third studio album by American deathgrind band Terrorizer. It was released on February 24, 2012, through Season of Mist. This is Terrorizer's first album since 2006's Darker Days Ahead and the last album to feature bassist David Vincent.

The tracks "Hordes of Zombies" and "Subterfuge" are featured as downloadable content in Rock Band 3 via the Rock Band Network.

A music video was made for "Hordes of Zombies".

== Track listing ==
All lyrics written by Anthony "Wolf" Rezhawk.

No.	Title	Length
1.	"Intro"	1:52
2.	"Hordes of Zombies"	3:28
3.	"Ignorance and Apathy"	2:10
4.	"Subterfuge"	1:59
5.	"Evolving Era"	3:24
6.	"Radiation Syndrome"	2:07
7.	"Flesh to Dust"	2:19
8.	"Generation Chaos"	2:09
9.	"Broken Mirrors"	3:08
10.	"Prospect of Oblivion"	3:25
11.	"Malevolent Ghosts"	3:00
12.	"Forward to Annihilation"	2:01
13.	"State of Mind"	3:18
14.	"A Dying Breed"	3:47
Total length:		38:07

Limited Edition and Digipak Bonus Tracks
No.	Title	Length
1.	"Wretched"	2:41
2.	"Hordes of Zombies" (Demo Version)	3:28
Total length:		44:16

Japanese Bonus Tracks
No.	Title	Length
1.	"Wretched"	2:41
2.	"Hordes of Zombies" (Demo Version)	3:28
3.	"Ignorace and Apathy" (Demo Version)	2:11
4.	"Flesh to Dust" (Demo Version)	2:21
Total length:		48:47

== Personnel ==
- Anthony Rezhawk – vocals
- Katina Culture – guitars
- David Vincent – bass
- Pete Sandoval – drums
