= You Will Never Be One of Us =

Studio album by Nails
- Released: June 17, 2016
- Recorded: December 27, 2015–January 6, 2016
- Studio: God City
- Genre: Grindcore; death metal; powerviolence
- Length: 21:43
- Label: Nuclear Blast
- Producer: Kurt Ballou

Nails chronology
Abandon All Life (2013)	You Will Never Be One of Us (2016)	Nails / Full of Hell (2016)

You Will Never Be One of Us is the third studio album by American hardcore punk band Nails, released on June 17, 2016. It is the band's first album issued through Nuclear Blast Records. It is their longest release to date at 21 minutes, and features their longest song, "They Come Crawling Back", which runs for eight minutes. The record was produced by Kurt Ballou of Converge.

== Critical reception ==
Professional ratings
Aggregate scores
Source	Rating
Metacritic	87/100
Review scores
Source	Rating
AllMusic	4/5 stars
The A.V. Club	A−
Exclaim!	9/10
Metal Hammer	4/5 stars
Metal Injection	9.5/10
MetalSucks	4/5 stars
Pitchfork	7.8/10
Rock Sound	8/10
The Quietus	Very positive

You Will Never Be One of Us received critical acclaim upon its release. At Metacritic, which assigns a normalized rating out of 100 to reviews from mainstream publications, the album received an average score of 87, based on 9 reviews, indicating universal acclaim.

=== Accolades ===
Publication	Accolade	Year	Rank
The A.V. Club	The A.V. Club's Top 50 Albums of 2016	2016	16
Rolling Stone	20 Best Metal Albums of 2016	2016	12
Metal Hammer	The 50 Best Metal Albums of 2016	2016	13
Metal Injection	Metal Injection Writers' Overall Top 20 Albums of 2016	2016	11
LA Weekly	The Top 10 Metal Albums of 2016	2016	1

== Track listing ==
All music and lyrics by Nails, except "Friend to All" ("a couple of lyrics" by Necros) and "They Come Crawling Back" (outro music written by Dead Black).

You Will Never Be One of Us
No.	Title	Length
1.	"You Will Never Be One of Us"	1:29
2.	"Friend to All"	0:45
3.	"Made to Make You Fail"	0:55
4.	"Life Is a Death Sentence"	1:39
5.	"Violence Is Forever"	3:26
6.	"Savage Intolerance"	1:46
7.	"In Pain"	1:01
8.	"Parasite"	0:55
9.	"Into Quietus"	1:33
10.	"They Come Crawling Back"	8:14
Total length:		21:43

== Personnel ==
Nails

- Todd Jones – guitars, vocals
- John Gianelli – bass guitar, backing vocals
- Taylor Young – drums, additional vocal engineering

Additional contributors

- Kurt Ballou – production, engineering, mixing
- Brad Boatright – mastering
- Jimmy Hubbard – photography
- Scott Magrath – design, layout
- WHTHD – artwork

== Charts ==
Chart (2016)	Peak position
Australian Albums (ARIA)	93
Belgian Albums (Ultratop Flanders)	127
Belgian Albums (Ultratop Wallonia)	168
UK Albums (OCC)	142
US Billboard 200	127
