= Murder Construct =

American band

- Origin: Los Angeles, California, United States
- Genres: Grindcore, death metal
- Years active: 2001–present
- Label: Relapse
- Members: Travis Ryan; Leon del Muerte; Chris McCarthy; Caleb Schneider; Danny Walker
- Past members: Kevin Fetus; Jeremy Gregg
- Website: www.murderconstruct.com

Murder Construct is an American extreme metal band from Los Angeles, California, United States. The band members are Travis Ryan (Cattle Decapitation), Leon del Muerte (Nausea LA, ex-Exhumed, ex-D.I.S., ex-Intronaut, ex-Impaled, ex-Phobia), Chris McCarthy (Exhausted Prater, Dreaming Dead), Caleb Schneider (Bad Acid Trip) and Danny Walker (ex-Intronaut, Exhumed, ex-Jesu, ex-Uphill Battle). Previous band members include drummer Jeremy Gregg.

== History ==
Murder Construct was formed in 2001 following Leon del Muerte's departure from Impaled. The band then went through several line-up changes and subsequently the band went on hiatus while del Muerte rejoined Exhumed, and later Phobia and Intronaut.

The band was re-formed in August 2006, when del Muerte left Intronaut. The band then recorded a self-titled 7-song EP. On March 27, 2010, the band played its first show. In August 2010, the band signed with Relapse Records. The band toured with Kill the Client and Venomous Concept in September 2010. In November 2010, Relapse Records released their self-titled EP.

In June 2012, Relapse Records announced the debut album cover and title, Results. The album was released on August 28, 2012. In February 2013, the band parted ways with Kevin Fetus, and were joined by new guitarist Chris McCarthy. Murder Construct then tracked a Disrupt cover for a tribute to Disrupt, which was released on Power It Up Records.

== Members ==
=== Current members ===
- Travis Ryan – vocals
- Leon del Muerte – vocals, guitar
- Chris McCarthy – guitar
- Caleb Schneider – bass guitar
- Danny Walker – drums

=== Past members ===
- Kevin Fetus – guitar
- Jeremy Gregg – drums

== Discography ==
- Murder Construct EP (2010)
- Results (2012)
