= Friends (American band) =

American indie band

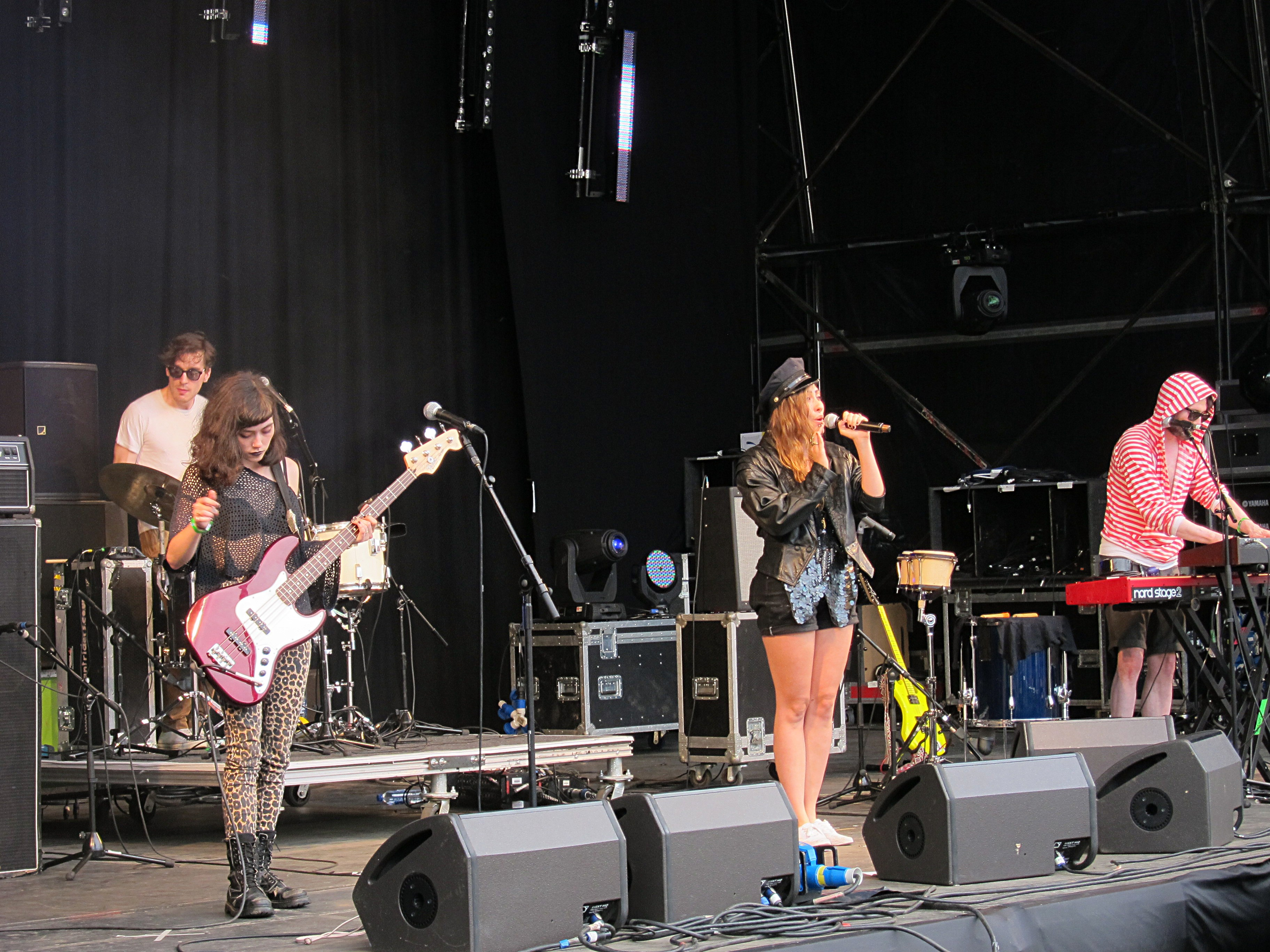
- Friends on-stage in 2012 at the Summer Sundae festival, Leicester, England, UK

Background information
- Also known as: Perpetual Crush (former name)
- Origin: Brooklyn, New York, U.S.
- Genres: Dance-punk; indie pop
- Years active: 2010–2013
- Labels: Lucky Number, Fat Possum (2012–2013)
- Members: Samantha Urbani; Nikki Shapiro; Oliver Duncan; Lesley Hann; Matthew Molnar; V; Etienne Pierre Duguay; Sasha Winn
- Website: aFriendsZone.com

Friends were a band from Brooklyn, New York formed in September 2010 and disbanded sometime in 2013. The band, originally named Perpetual Crush, consisted of Samantha Urbani (vocals), Lesley Hann (bass, percussion, backing vocals), Nikki Shapiro (guitar, keyboards, percussion), Matthew Molnar (keyboards, percussion, bass, and brother of Charley Molnar, former head football coach at UMass) and Oliver Duncan (drums).

The group released the singles "Friend Crush" and "I'm His Girl" in 2011. On April 10, 2012, BBC Radio 1 DJ Huw Stephens selected the band's third single, "Mind Control", as his Hottest Record in the World.

Friends were named one of NME's top 50 artists of 2011 and were nominated for the BBC's poll 'Sound of 2012'. Their music has been described as eclectic; "One moment it's indie pop, the next it's mutant funk, then disco - something that sounds only of itself, even as the echoes of the past flit through the songs."

== Discography ==
=== Studio albums ===
Title	Details
Manifest!	Released: 4 June 2012; Label: Lucky Number; Formats: LP, DL

=== Singles ===
Single	Year	Album
"I'm His Girl"	2011	Manifest!
"Friend Crush"	2012	Manifest!
"Mind Control"	2012	Manifest!
