= Power It Up Records =

German record label

Power It Up Records is a German record label mainly focused on grindcore. The label puts out both vinyl and CD. It has released records with Birdflesh, Rotten Sound, Regurgitate, Bathtub Shitter and Yacøpsæ among others.

== See also ==
- List of record labels
