= Weathervanes (Freelance Whales album) =

Studio album by Freelance Whales
- Released: December 29, 2009
- Genre: Indie pop, indie folk, folktronica, indietronica, chamber pop
- Length: 45:15
- Label: Mom + Pop Music, Frenchkiss

Freelance Whales chronology
Weathervanes (2009)	Diluvia (2012)

Singles from Weathervanes
- 1. "Generator ^ First Floor" Released: December 29, 2009; 2. "Generator ^ Second Floor" Released: April 6, 2010; 3. "Hannah" Released: September 13, 2010

Weathervanes is the debut studio album by the American indie pop group Freelance Whales. The album was released on December 29, 2009.

The song "Generator ^ First Floor" was used to help launch the new Twitter redesign on September 14, 2010, and was made available for free download. The same song also appeared in a Starbucks commercial, which first aired in March 2011.

The song "Generator ^ Second Floor" was used in the second episode of the USA Network series Covert Affairs, during the scene where Auggie teaches Annie how to fight.

The song "Starring" was used in the series premiere episode of MTV's 2012 adaptation of The Inbetweeners, which aired on August 20, 2012. "Starring" plays during the cafeteria scene, when Carly speaks to Simon. The song "We Could be Friends" was used in the 12th episode of Ugly Betty, titled "Blackout".

== Critical reception ==
Professional ratings
Aggregate scores
Source	Rating
Metacritic	68%
Review scores
Source	Rating
Entertainment Weekly	(A−)
Slant (magazine)	3.5/5 stars
NME	(7/10)
Pitchfork Media	(4.2/10)

Critical response to Weathervanes has ranged from mixed to positive. As of January 23, 2011, the album has a Metacritic score of 68, based on 18 professional reviews.

== Track listing ==
All songs by Freelance Whales.

Weathervanes track listing
No.	Title	Length
1.	"Generator ^ First Floor"	3:06
2.	"Hannah"	3:37
3.	"Location"	4:37
4.	"Channels"	1:17
5.	"Starring"	3:33
6.	"Kilojoules"	3:19
7.	"Broken Horse"	4:37
8.	"Danse Flat"	1:14
9.	"Ghosting"	5:18
10.	"We Could Be Friends"	4:12
11.	"Vessels"	1:41
12.	"Generator ^ Second Floor"	4:30
13.	"The Great Estates"	4:01
