= Calligraffiti =

Calligraphy and graffiti art form

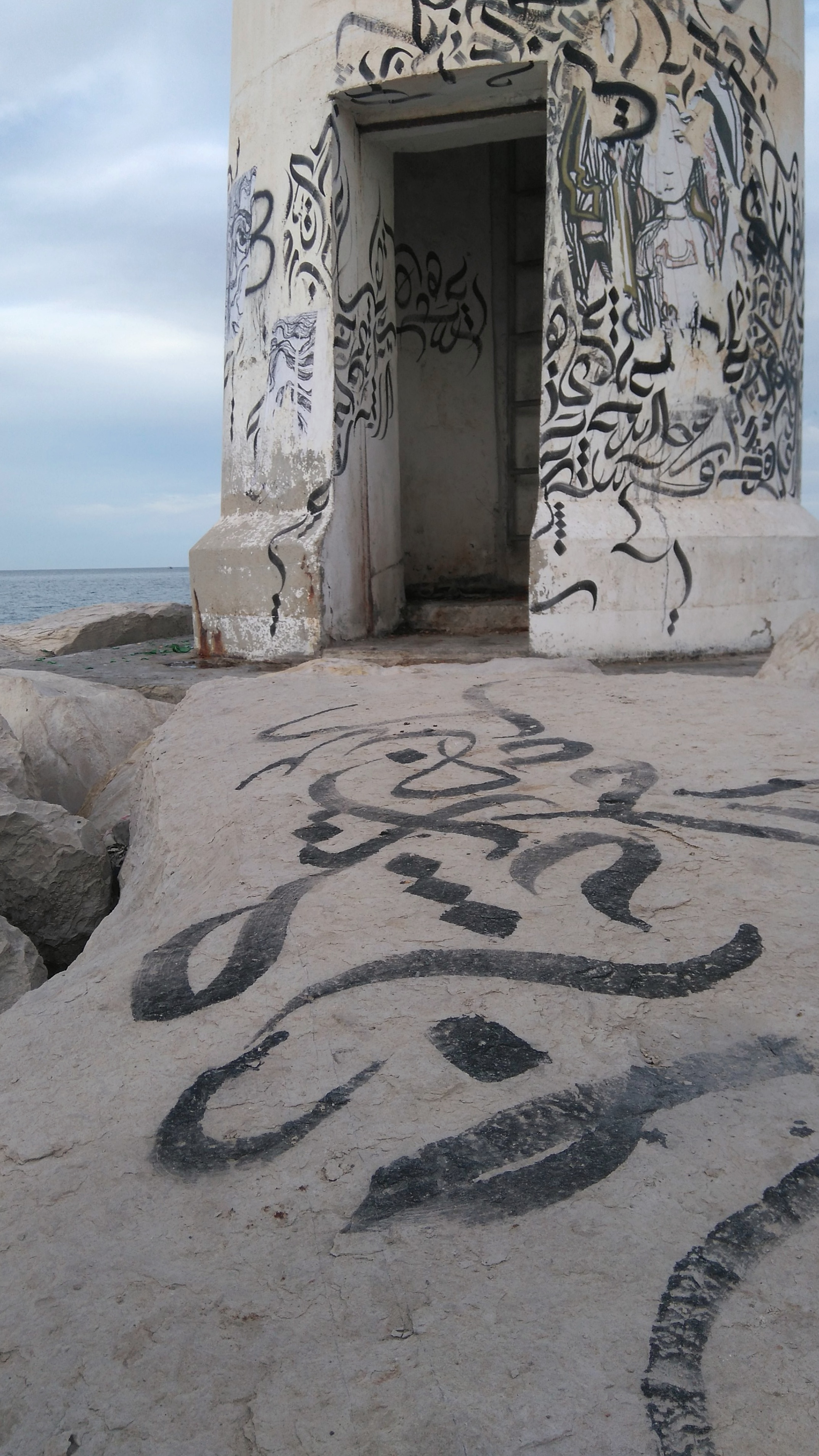
Calligraffiti at Port de Pêche de Sayada, February, 2017

Calligraffiti is an art form that combines calligraphy, typography, and graffiti. It can be classified as either abstract expressionism or abstract vandalism. It is defined as a visual art that integrates letters into compositions that attempt to communicate a broader message through writing that has been aesthetically altered to move beyond the literal meaning. Simply put, it is the conscious effort of making a word or group of words into a visual composition. As such it is meant to be both an aesthetic experience and provocative art—mixing tradition and precision with modern unbridled self-expression.

== Definition and brief history ==
The origins of the term, "calligraffiti" are unclear. The Dutch artist Niels Shoe Meulman is often incorrectly credited with coining the term in 2007, when he used it as the title of his solo exhibition. Meulman describes calligraffiti as "traditional handwriting with a metropolitan attitude" and a "way of translating the art of the street to the interior of museums, galleries and apartments." In an interview he explains the technique itself as "directness in the whole, finesse in the details. An even balance between seeing and reading word and image. … letters, writing and language itself becomes an image or abstraction. On the other hand, basic shapes and splats become language."

Use of the term, however, predates the contributions of Niels Shoe Meulman by at least thirty years. The Canadian painter, Brion Gysin used the term in his final exhibition, Calligraffiti of Fire held at the Galerie Samy Kinge in Paris between 19 April and 19 May in 1986 and the term was also used as the title of the book which accompanied Gysin's exhibition. The term was also used in a book about post-modernism, Spirits Hovering Over the Ashes: Legacies of Postmodern Theory by H.L. Hix in 1995.

Jordanian artist and art historian Wijdan Ali also used the term, "calligraffiti" in her book, Modern Islamic Art: Development and Continuity, (1997) to describe a style of art that had been flourishing across the Middle East and North Africa from the mid-20th century. She defined calligraffiti as the use of "script of ordinary writing where the work is composed of the artist's personalised handwriting within a modern composition." Ali wanted to use the term because she saw this type of art as being inspired by calligraphy yet, also close to the scribbling of graffiti artists. Pioneer artists in this style include: Hassan Massoudy, Hossein Zenderoudi and Parviz Tanavoli. Ali locates calligraffiti art as a distinct style within the School of Calligraphic Art (also known as the Hurufiyya movement).

Calligraffiti is distinguished from other styles of calligraphic art (such as Pure Calligraphy, Neoclassical, Modern Classical, Freeform, Abstract calligraphy, Calligraphic Combinations and Unconscious Calligraphy) in that it has no rules and artists require no formal training. Whereas, traditional calligraphy in the Islamic world is bound by very strict rules, not the least a prohibition on using representations of the human form in manuscripts, calligraffiti artists break free from such rules and allow themselves to reshape and deconstruct letters as well as to combine them with other symbols and figures in creative ways. Calligraffiti artists are not confined to the use of actual letters. Instead, they go beyond a simple transformation of Arabic or English-language words into visual compositions, and invent new languages.

Ali also makes a distinction between calligraffiti and pseudo-calligraffiti. Straight calligraffiti refers to the use of calligraphy without the rules of proportion while pseudo-calligraffiti is a total abstraction in which the letters may or may not be legible.

The practice of calligraffiti appears to have begun in the Middle East and North Africa in around the 1950s, when local artists, searching for a visual language that expressed their national identity and heritage, began incorporating Arabic letters, as a graphic form, into their artworks. Artists such as the Lebanese painter and poet, Etel Adnan (b. 1925); the Egyptian painter, Ramzi Moustafa (b. 1926) and the Iraqi painter-sculptor and philosopher, Shakir Hassan Al Said (b.1925) all searched for ways to use Arabic letters in abstract compositions.

The incidence of calligraffiti gathered momentum during the early 21st century when Middle Eastern street artists co-opted urban spaces for calligraffiti art designed to convey political or provocative statements. This street art practice was especially conspicuous during the wave of uprisings between 2010 and 2013, that became known as the Arab Spring thereby bringing the art form to the attention of international audiences. Certain calligraffiti artists have credited the Middle Eastern calligraphy artists as an important influence on their work. For instance, the Tunisian calligraffiti artist, el Seed points to the work of Iraqi painter, Hassan Massoudy as a major source of inspiration, noting that "The work of Hassan Massoudy was totally out of anything I’ve seen from the way he shapes the letters to the colors he uses. He completely revolutionized the art of calligraphy.”

=== Characteristics ===
Calligraffiti is a complex process. Its specificity is in its paradoxical nature, as it is characterised by and composed of many elements that appear contradictory:

- blending of tradition and modernity
- sharing of culture and political subversion
- beauty and provocation
- precision and spontaneity
- philosophical and reactionary
- literal and metaphorical

It requires an overall vision from the artist- from the message he is trying to convey, to the shape of the letters, to the larger picture he is creating. Calligraffiti artist, Tubs, explains that the art form's graffiti component forces the artist to reflect upon and consciously create a piece that will arouse a specific feeling or reaction in the viewer. However, the use of the alphabet as an artistic medium demands practice, accuracy, and foresight.

=== Tools ===
Part of what differentiates calligraffiti from calligraphy is its freedom from rules. Calligraphy is a meticulous and specific art that takes years to master. Most calligraffiti artists, like El Seed, do not consider themselves calligraphers because they do not know, nor do they follow the many rules of calligraphy. Calligraffiti on the other hand is characterized by its diversity of mediums, methods, and instruments. Each individual artist uses and sometimes designs his or her own tools.

=== Arabic calligraphy as historical background ===
Arabic calligraphy is incredibly rich; it is an art form that has been perfected for well over a millennium. Islamic tradition greatly encouraged the development of calligraphy as an art form in order to bear witness of the written word and to spread Islam. In the Quran, Arabic writing represents the word of God revealed to Muhammad, which gives Arabic letters a special meaning.

The spread and evolution of calligraphy can be traced very specifically throughout Islamic history as it is inherently tied to the spread of Islam itself. Calligraphy was how scribes transcribed and created copies of the Quran—allowing Muhammad's message to extend beyond the Arabian Peninsula. Calligraphy has always had a central role in Middle Eastern art, because of Islamic restrictions concerning the portrayal of living beings. As a result, calligraphy became not only a tool for the expansion of Islam, but its most characteristic form of religious art.

=== Calligraffiti: calligraphy of the 21st century ===
Calligraffiti has emerged quite forcefully in the Middle East in recent years, particularly in the wake of the Arab uprisings. While graffiti has never been widespread in the region, it has spread with the rising dissidence against Middle Eastern dictatorships and authoritarian regimes. Calligraphy artist Hassan Massoudy called Arabic calligraphy and graffiti "two daughters of the same parents" because of their interrelationship. He notes that "Obviously [calligraphy and graffiti] both are about the use of letters and their alphabets, and their center of gravity is the beauty of writing. For both, a letter is more than just a letter and they fill them with emotions. The use of empty space and composition within this space is something else they have in common. Calligraffiti is a logical evolution of the two art forms coexisting in the same space.

The first step towards calligraffiti was the emergence of the abstract movement in the Middle East during the 20th century. Calligraphy was impacted by the abstract movement in the 1960s and 1970s with the introduction of the Hurufiyya movement in the Arab world and the Saqqa Khaneh movement in Iran. Hassan Massoudy, Hossein Zenderoudi and Parviz Tanavoli were some of the pioneers of this new era of calligraphy. The next two decades saw an initial explosion of graffiti in the context of the First Intifada and the Lebanese Civil War. Today, much calligraffiti is influenced by early Islamic script styles like Siyah mashq and Kufic. Artist and activist Janet Kozak, characterizes calligraffiti artists in the Middle East as being "not bound by the shackles of tradition, yet still indebted to it", as they use "a unique blend of traditional scripts and design mixed with modern materials and techniques".

Selected works of calligraffiti artists

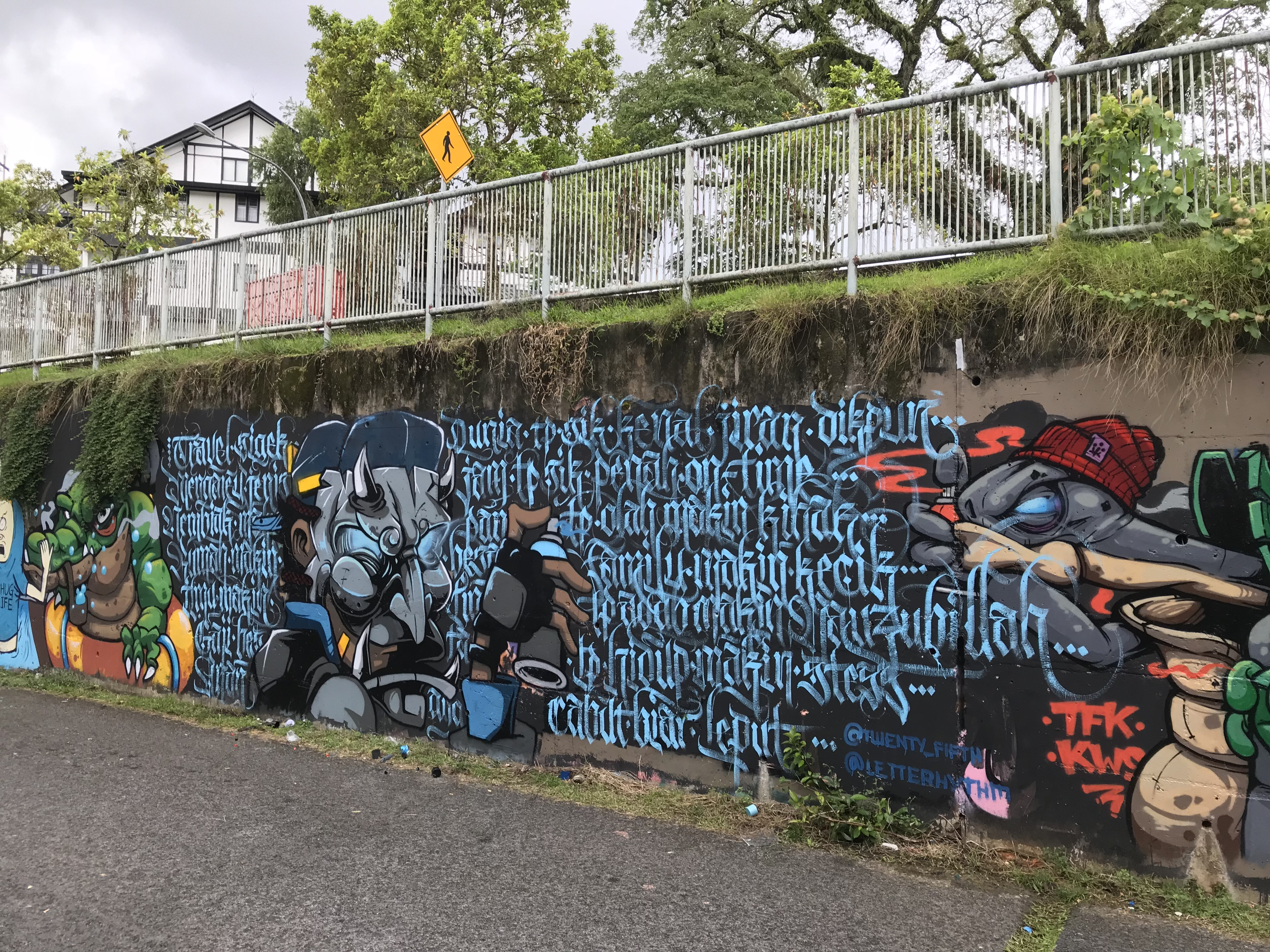
Calligraffiti in local language on the streets of Kuching, Sarawak, Malaysia, 2018

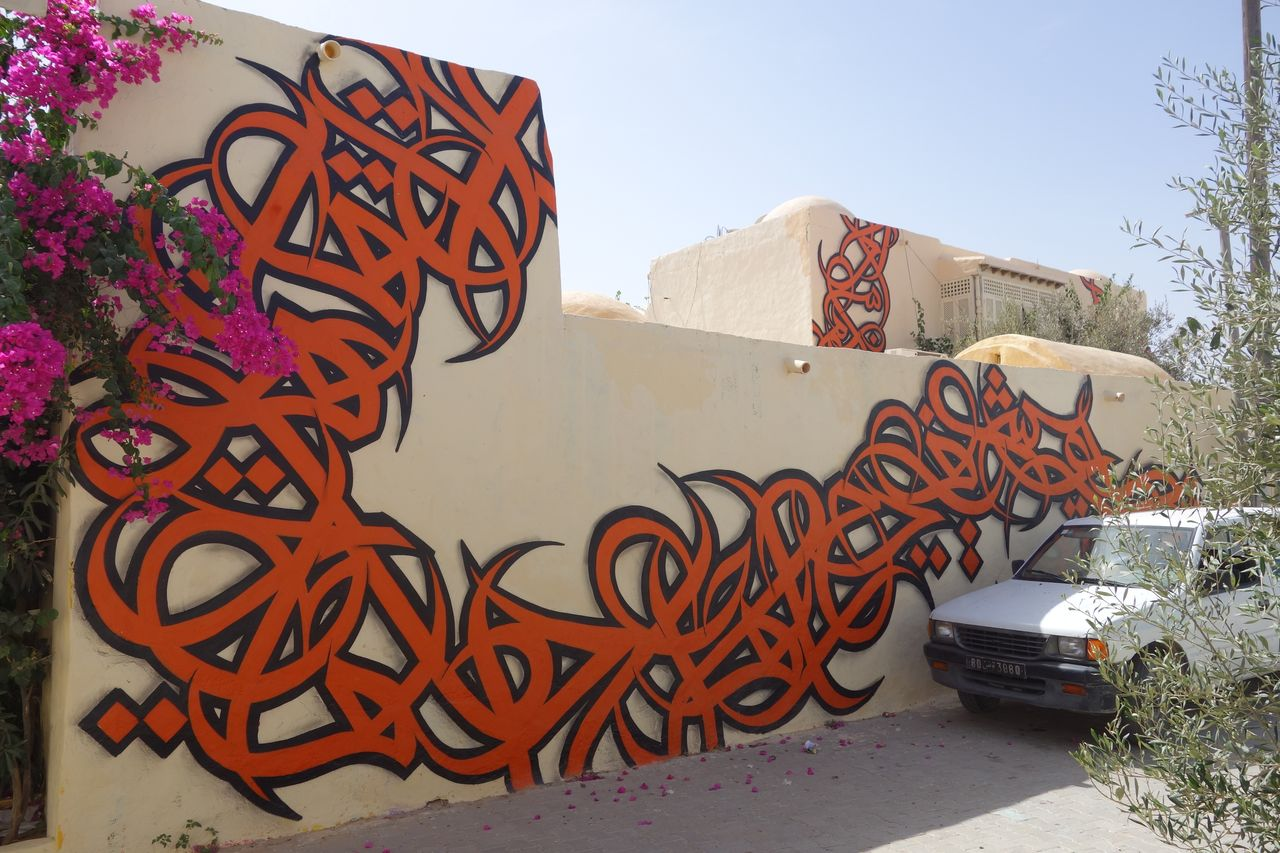
Street art in Djerba Street, Er Ryadh Quarter, Tunisia, by El-Seed, 2014

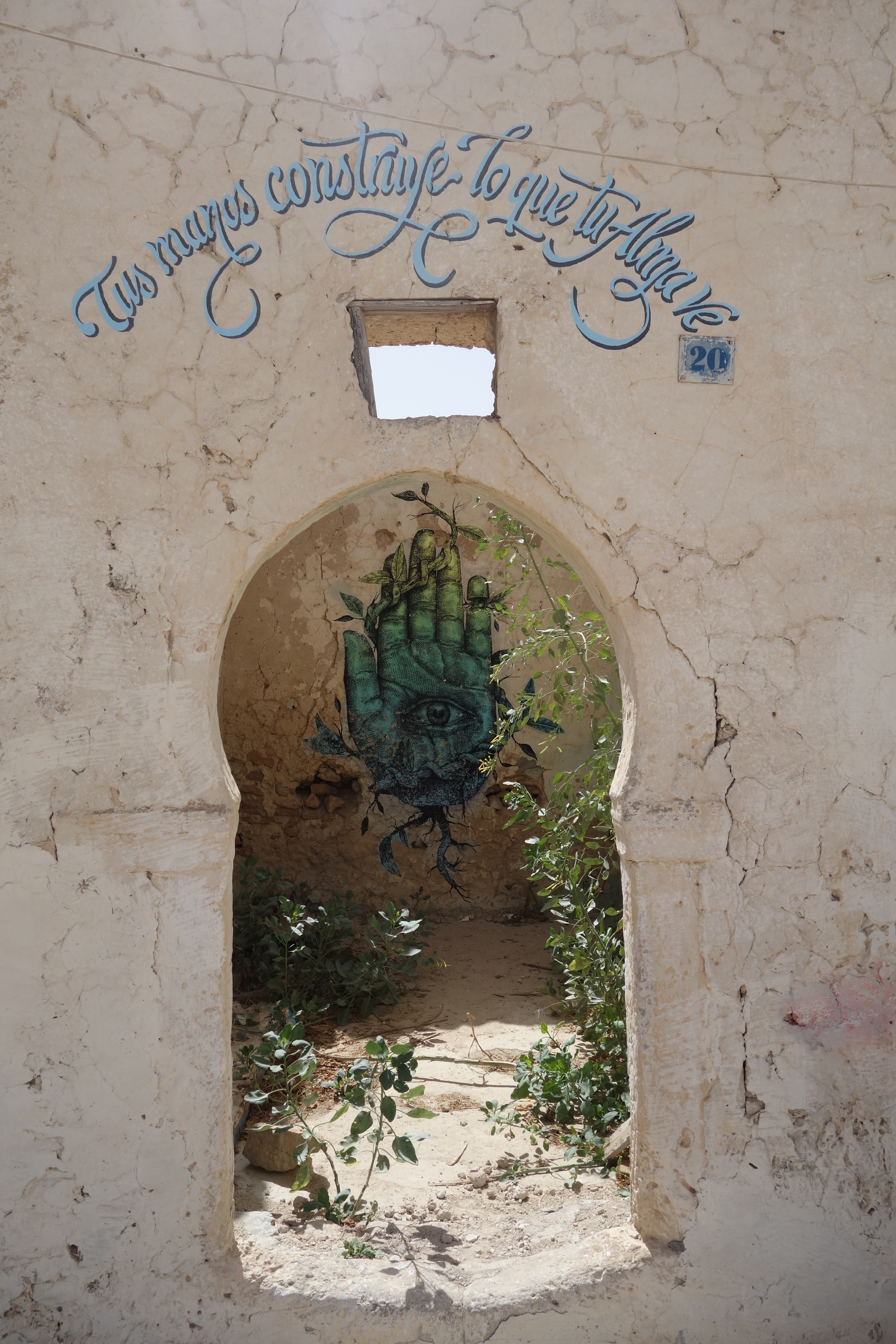
Street art, Djerba Street, Er Ryadh Quarter, Tunisia, by unknown artist, 2014

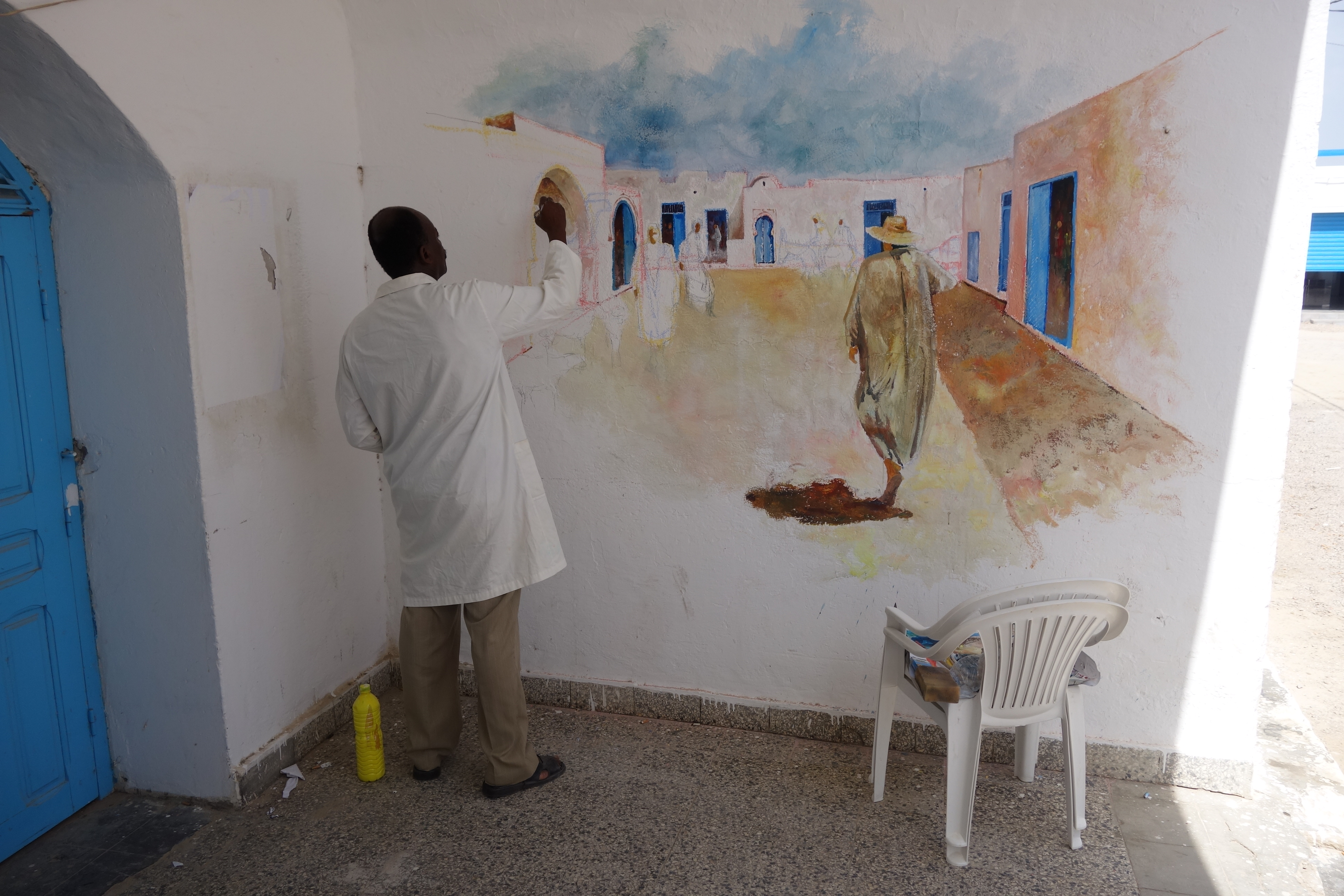
Street art Djerba Street, Er Ryadh Quarter, Tunisia, by unknown artist, 2014

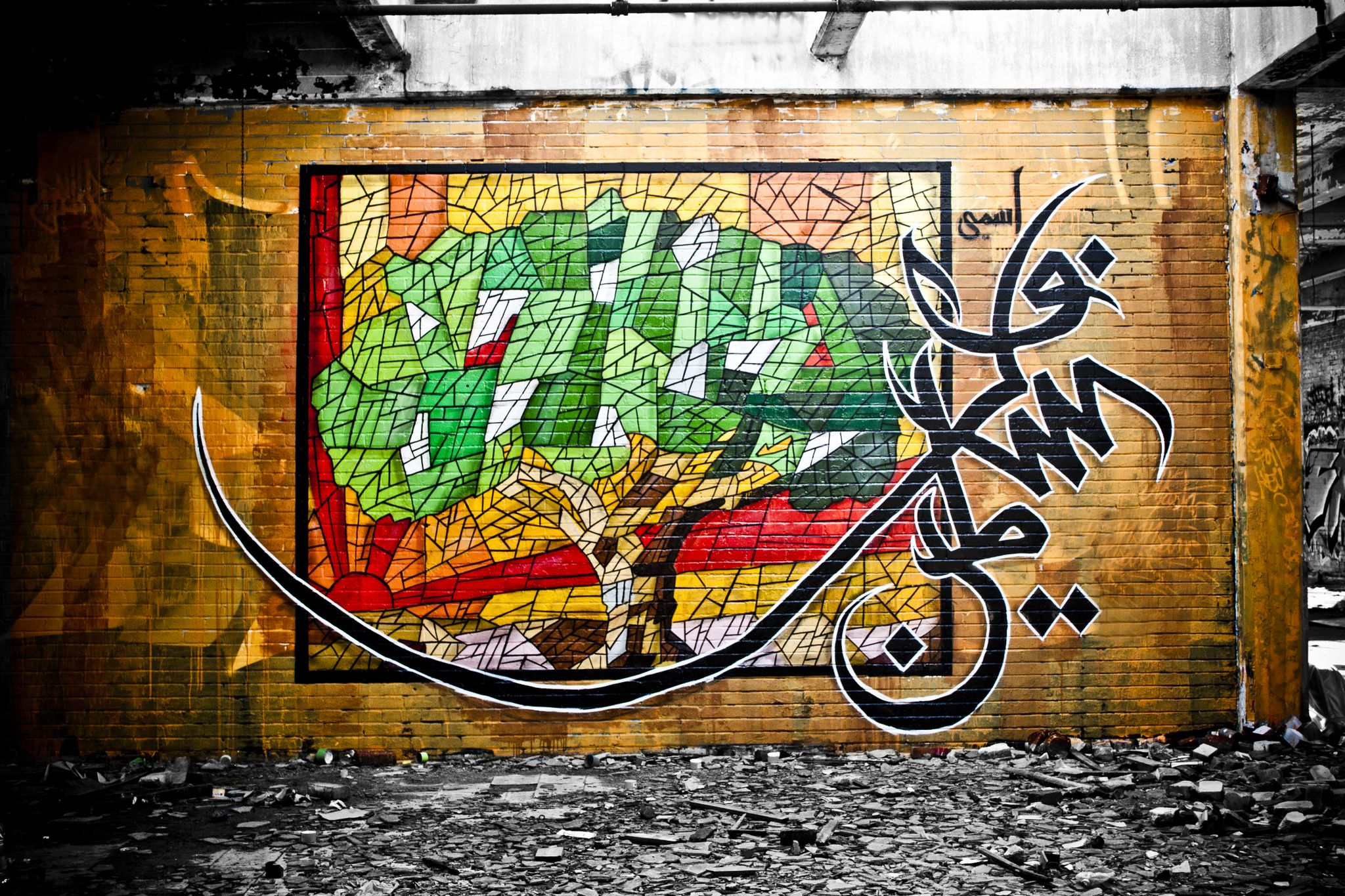
My name is Palestine, by EL Seed, Montreal, 2010

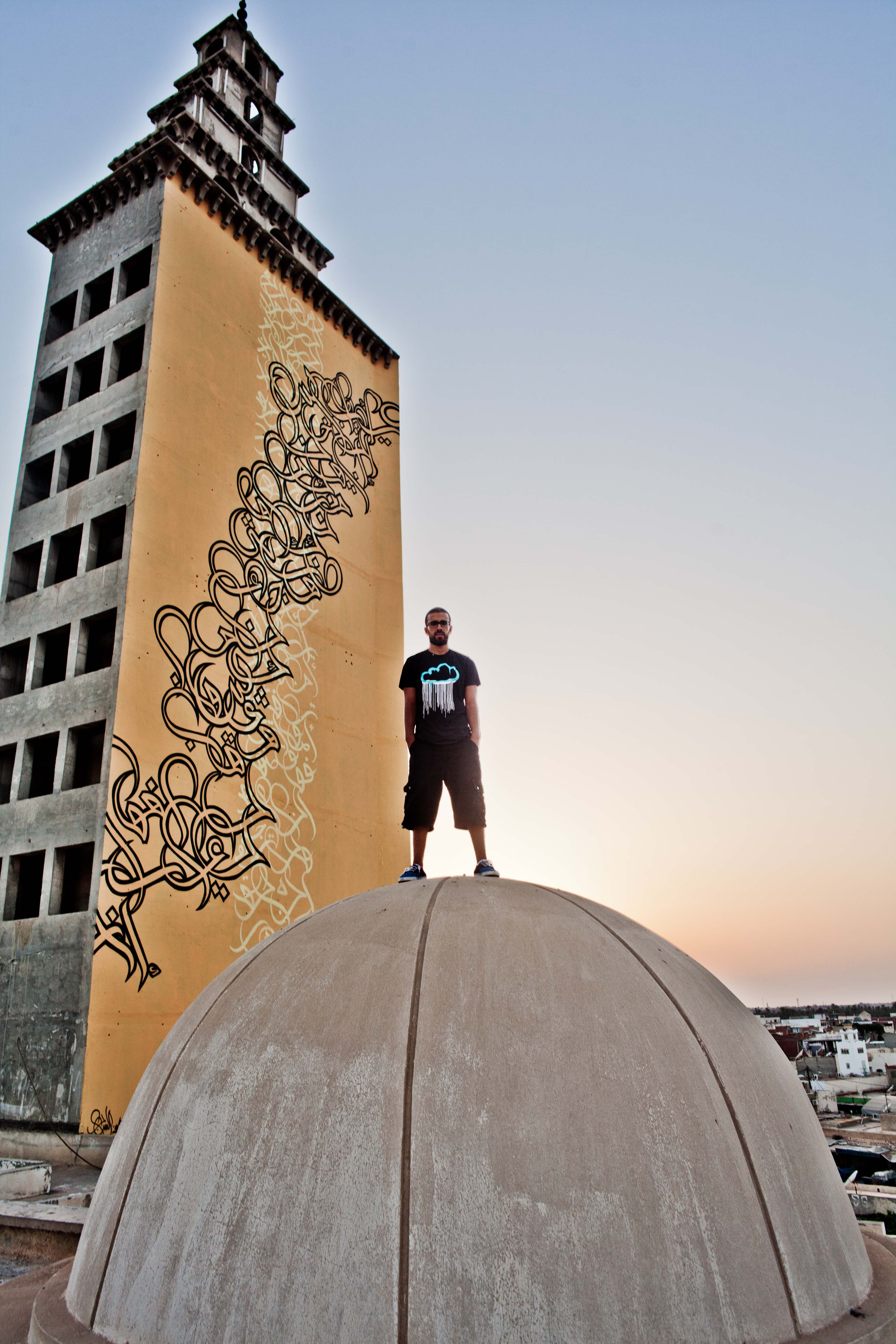
Jara Mosque, Tunisia, by El Seed, date unknown

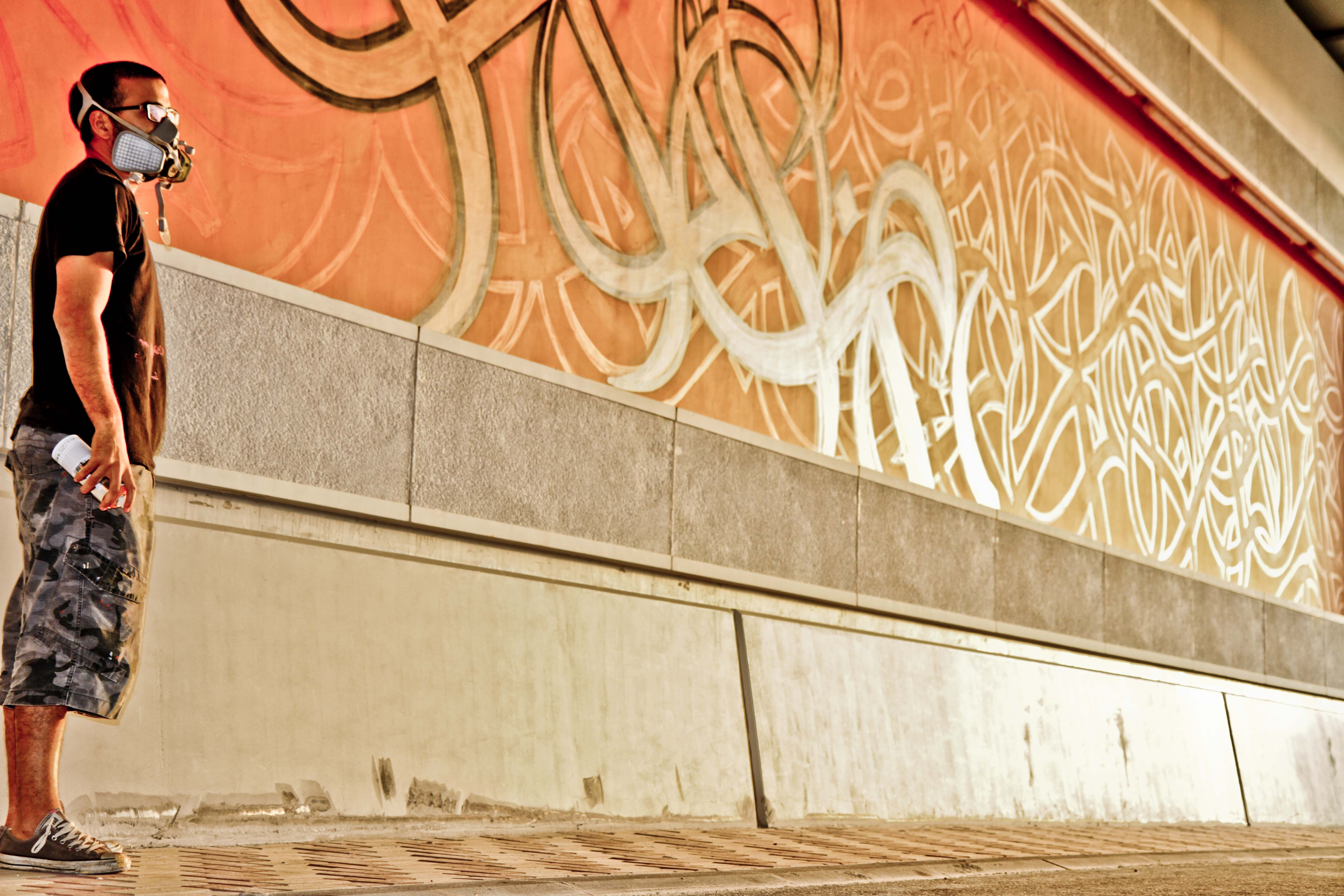
Mural, Salwa Road, Doha, Qatar by El Seed, date unknown

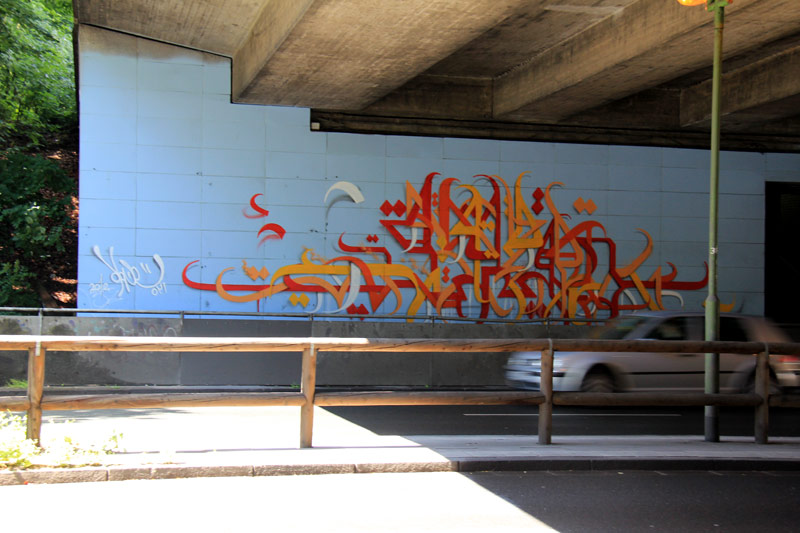
Calligraphy Street Art in a Paris Street, by A1One, date unknown

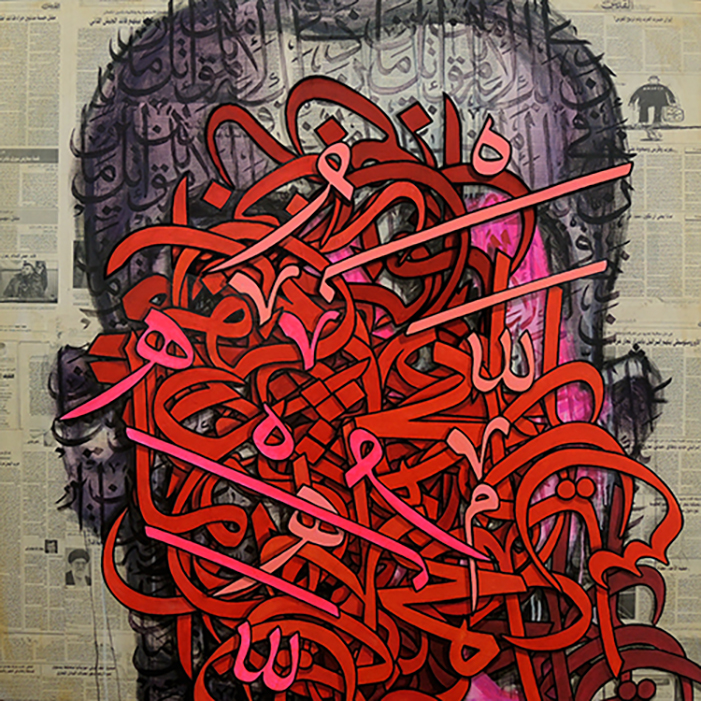
I Am Baghdad-Shei'i & Sunni by Iraqi-American painter Ayad Alkadhi, 2016

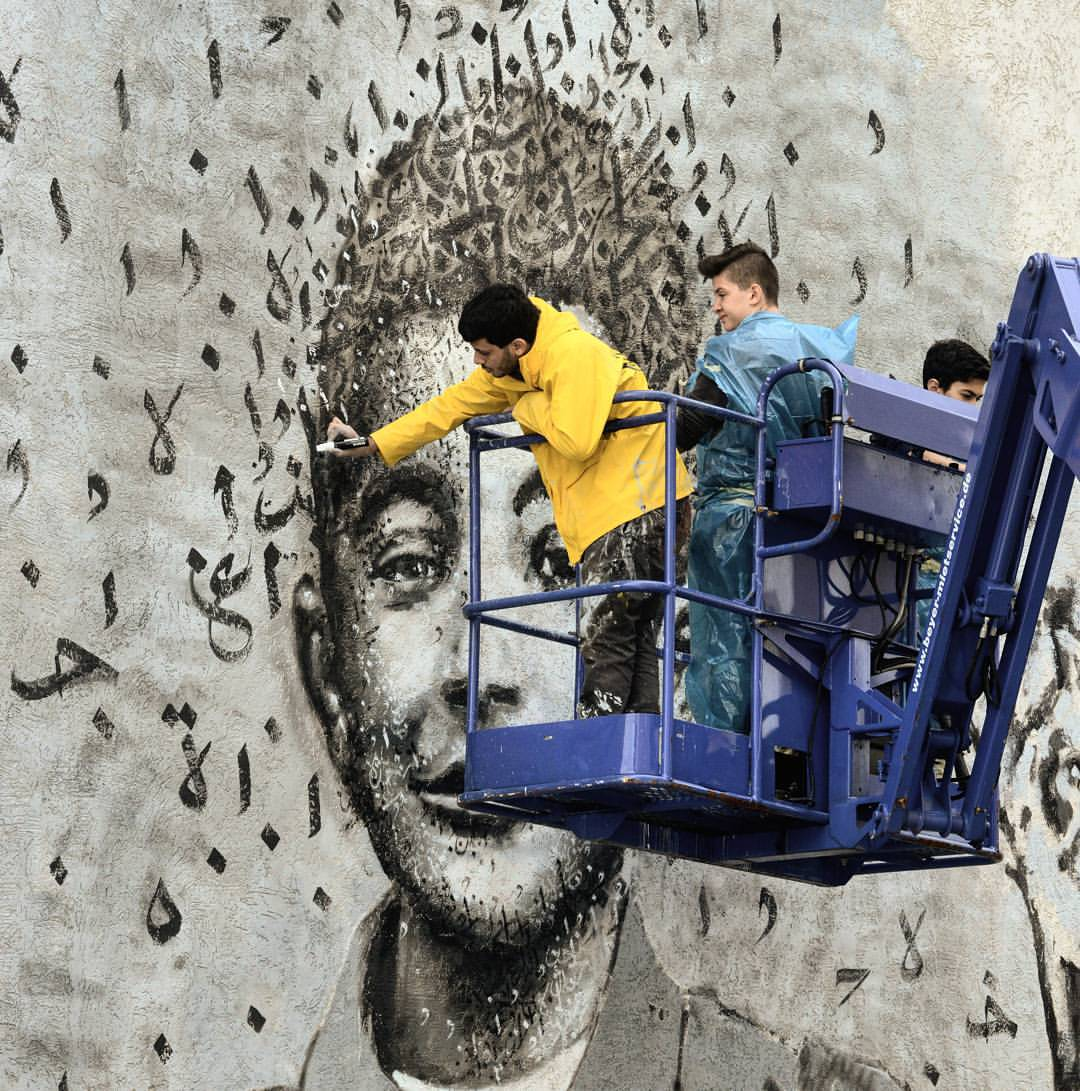
Yazan Halwani in Dortmund Germany painting The Flower Salesman, date unknown

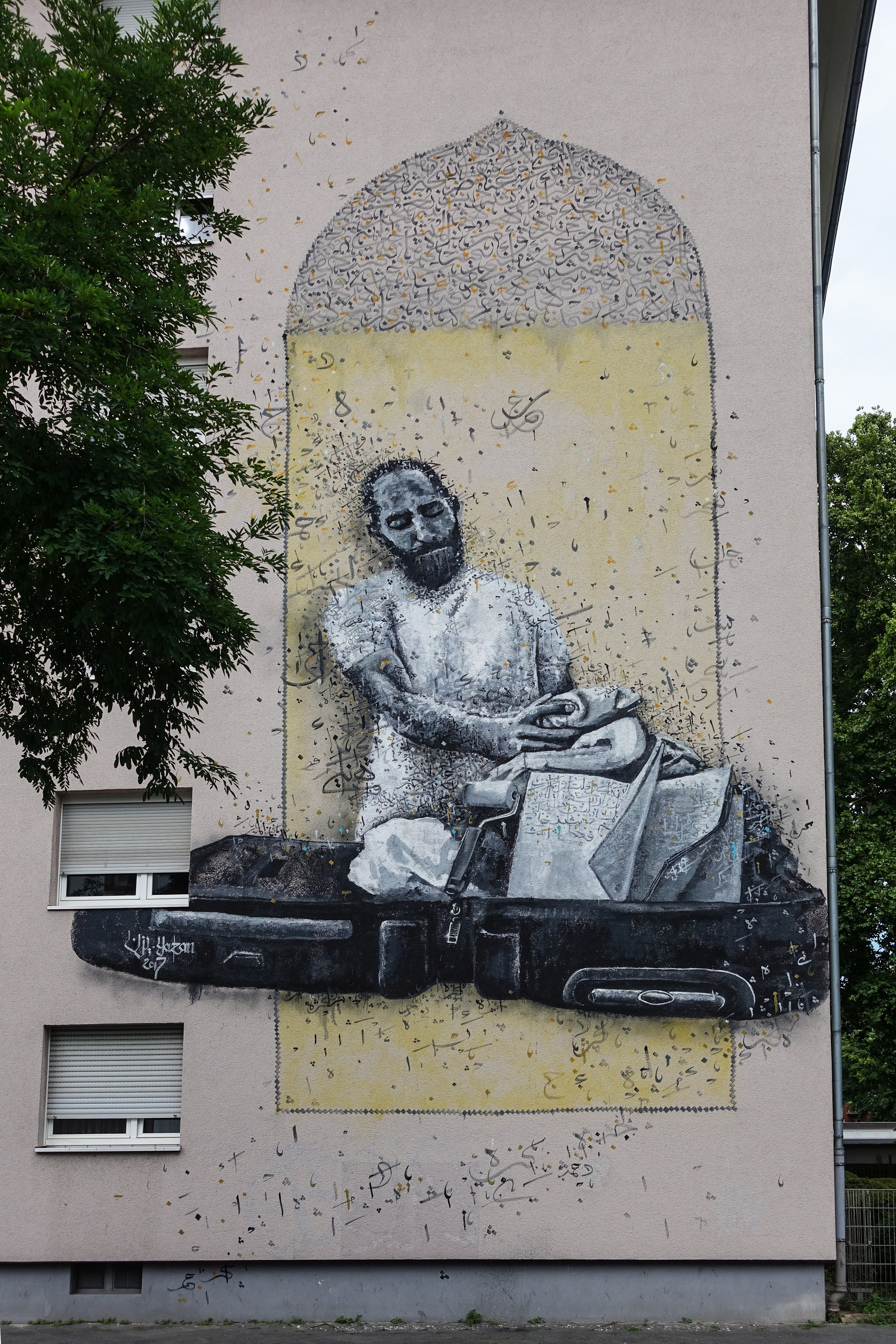
The inevitability of leaving things behind, by Yazan Halwani, Mannheim, Germany, 2017

=== Public displays in the Middle East ===
- Two Walls One Boat: Festival Monastir'IN in Monastir, Tunisia by Tarek Benaoum
- Manshiyat Naser neighborhood in Cairo, Egypt
- The old town of Jeddah (Al Balad), Saudi Arabia: El Seed
- The Gabes Mosque in Gabes, Tunisia: El Seed
- Large mural in Kairawan, Tunisia: El Seed
- Salwa Road in Doha, Qatar: El Seed
- Walls of houses in the Djerbahood neighborhood of Tunisia: Inkman and El Seed
- USINA tribute project: The Story of Brave Men commemorating the workers of the Tunisian Boukornine factory: Inkman
- Sharjah Biennal, UAE: Ruh Al-Alam
- Sharjah Biennal, Iran: Sasan Nasernia

=== Publications ===
- Lost Walls: A Calligraffiti Journey Through Tunisia, Published in 2014, written by El Seed
- Calligraffiti: The Graphic Art of Neils Shoe Meulman, Published in 2010, by Niels Shoe Meulman
- Arabic Graffiti, Published in 2011, written by Pascal Zoghbi and Don Stone Karl
- Ted Talk by El Seed: Street art with a message of hope and peace, by El Seed

== Beyond the aesthetic ==
Calligraffiti has been a way for artists in the Middle East to reclaim the region while still staying grounded in their culture and tradition. From the civil war in Beirut, to the Palestinian intifadas, to the Arab uprisings, calligraffiti has become a mechanism for social and political protest—where letters become symbols. One of the most salient characteristics of the Arab Spring has been the reappropriation of the public sphere and calligraffiti does just that. Calligraffiti is an urban art as much as it is a gallery art, and as such it has served as a tool to reclaim public spaces and impose the will and opinion of the people. Once an infrequent sight, graffiti and calligraffiti now adorn the walls of most major cities in the Middle East, representing the rising political and social tensions in the region. Despite most artists' claims that they are neither political or social actors, their art has inevitable impact—as Saudi artist Rana Jarbou said "words are weapons".

=== Political uses ===
Many calligraffiti artists contest the idea that their art is political. Askar insists his calligraffiti pieces in Palestine do not make him a political activist, he says "I protest in colors, my activism consists of bringing art to the streets and allowing the public to express themselves"; similarly, El Seed has said "I don’t have any political agenda. I don’t believe in politics". But by nature, calligraffiti is meant to express a message, and so it has unavoidable social and political consequences.

Protesting political affairs has been the subject of much of the graffiti in the region, and calligraffiti has not escaped this. Much of the anonymous calligraffiti that emerged from the Arab Spring is deeply embedded in a political struggle. El Seed's 2011 mural in Kairouan Tunisia, a poem by Abu al-Qasim al-Husayafi about tyranny and injustice, cannot be separated from the political context it was created in. Similarly, Askar's piece entitled "Palestine" cannot be separated from the political weight the word "Palestine" holds; nor can his piece that says "salaam" (meaning peace), that is shaped like a key, escape the symbolism of the key in the Palestinian occupation. Anonymous calligraffiti on the Israeli wall in Bethlehem is inherently political because of its location.

The exhibit "Contemporary Arabic Graffiti and Lettering" explores how Calligraffiti creates a dialogue between the social and political sphere, by questioning dominant beliefs and ideologies. It does this by imposing itself on the religious and political debates by commandeering public spaces. Khadiga El Ghawas is one calligraffiti artist that does not shy away from the political messages of her art. She says "My compositions touch upon issues that we currently face in Egypt whether that’s related to politics, religion or society". Her work very explicitly deals with the political realities of Egypt, whether it is political Islam, democracy, or women's issues.

=== Social uses ===
Calligraffiti, as art, has the power to influence society and the people who are exposed to it. For example, it can be used to bring awareness to lost memories or forgotten moments in history. Inkman's USINA project decorates the forgotten limestone factory walls in Boukornine Tunisia to remind the world of those who struggled there and pay them respect. El Seed's Lost Walls project attempts to redirect the world and Tunisia's attention to the beauty of the country. His purpose was to create hope in Tunisia; that the people of the country could rediscover something positive and be proud of their culture in the midst of political turmoil. Lebanese artist Yazan Halwani says his art is means to "write the stories of the city, on its own walls—creating a memory for the city". The civil war created a deep fragmentation within the Lebanese society and a sense of amnesia that Halwani sought to fight against. His calligraffiti is meant to portray the city in a positive light, repair social ties and breathe life into a broken society. GhalamDAR, an Iranian artist, tries to reconnect Iranians to their country and culture. He often questions contemporary identity, philosophy, and history in Iran, which can be seen in his piece on the Iranian diaspora that features a headless deer. Calligraffiti has been a way for all of these artists to try and better the communities they live in.

Another way in which calligraffiti has impacted the social sphere is by engaging a discuss about contemporary issues and bringing people together. El Seed's calligraffiti on the Gabes mosque is a quotation from the Qur'an meant to address intolerance, specifically in regards to religion, art, and the growing Islamist movement in the world. The quote reads "Oh humankind, we have created you from a male and a female and made people and tribes so you may know each other"; it attempts to break stereotypes and opens a discussion around the place of art in Islam. After finishing his project "Perception" in Cairo, El Seed explained that he is "questioning the level of judgment and misconception society can unconsciously have upon a community based on their differences". El Seed has referred to himself as an "artivist", or an artist and an activist at the same time.

== Calligraffiti: between Middle East and West ==
Many calligrafitti artists use Arabic script or are heavily inspired by it. There has been a rise in Arabic calligraffiti outside the Middle East and by non Middle Eastern artists. Arabic calligraffiti has become a cosmopolitan art form. This can partially be attributed to the richness of Arabic calligraphy compared to other scripts. The use of Arabic calligraphy has been a typographic decision by many artists who seek to reinvent the aesthetic.

=== A search for identity ===
The widespread use of Arabic calligraphy outside the Middle East is often a result of political and social dynamics. Colonization and immigration has led to an identity crisis in many people, one the artist El Seed often talks about. He says his style developed from his struggle to fit in; the feeling that while he was not French, he was not fully Tunisian either. The legacy of colonization has created hybrid identities, especially in Europe, but has also allowed other cultures to be exposed to Middle Eastern cultures. As a result, artists like Julien Breton and L'atlas have adopted the Arabic script style. Artists like Aerosol Arabic or Haji Noor Deen turned to Arabic calligraffiti after they converted to Islam. Many artists use calligraffiti to reconnect with cultural and historical identities that they lost, or as a way to find a new identity.

== Artists ==
Calligraffiti is a relatively new term and graffiti is still taboo in parts of the Middle East and Asia, and as a result many calligraffiti artists are anonymous or rely on pseudonyms. Additionally, many calligraphers have created calligraffiti pieces, even though it is not their primary focus. In 2015, Niels Shoe Meulman created the Calligraffiti Ambassadors with the aim of expanding the movement and creating a community of calligraffiti artists. The group has already grown since its inception and includes artists from all over the world.

=== Algeria ===
- Sneak Aitouche - official calligraffiti ambassador

=== Australia ===
- Peter F Pham

=== China ===
- Haji Noor Deen

=== Colombia ===
- Teck24 - official calligraffiti ambassador

=== Cyprus ===
- RoyalVenom Anatolis Spyrlidis - Cyprus Pilot Pen Ambassador, Cyprus Liquitex Ambassador, Cyprus Winsor & Newton Ambassador

=== Czech Republic ===
- iamRushdog (Adam Zimmermann) - Suprema Calligrafia Crew member, Molotow Ambassador

=== Egypt ===
- Khadiga El-Ghawas Egyptian artist who uses light calligraphy. She is also one of the only famous female calligraffiti artists.
- Ahmed Moustafa
- Ramzi Moustafa

=== Ecuador ===
- Con C de Caro - Artista - Muralista - Caligrafitti, Suprema Calligrafia Crew member, Todas Ecuador Crew member
- Ache - Artista Visual - Muralista - Caligrafitti, APC Crew member, Founder Kito en Kaos Artist Collective
- Shadow - Muralista - Graffiti - Caligrafitti

=== France ===
- cssJPG
- L'Atlas
- Julien Breton (aka Kaalam)
- Damien Dee Coureau - official calligraffiti ambassador
- Hest1
- Clement Kens - official calligraffiti ambassador
- Monsieur Cana (aka Ashan)
- Obese - official calligraffiti ambassador
- Jonas Sunset - official calligraffiti ambassador
- Zepha (aka Vincent Abadie Hafez)

=== Germany ===
- Jan Koke - official calligraffiti ambassador
- Nedda Kubba - official calligraffiti ambassador
- Anna T-iron - official calligraffiti ambassador
- Patrick Hartl - official calligraffiti ambassador
- Schriftzug - official calligraffiti ambassador
- Stohead - official calligraffiti ambassador
- Xuli - official calligraffiti ambassador

=== Greece ===
- Dimitris Valtas - official calligraffiti ambassador

=== India ===
- Kareemgraphy
- Inku Kumar - calligraffiti artist with project CALLIART in India
- Anaroop Kerketta - official calligraffit ambassador
- Mayur Munj - official calligraffit ambassador

=== Iran ===
- Siah Armajani
- A1one (aka Tanha)
- GhalamDAR
- Shirazeh Houshiary
- Farideh Lashai
- Reza Mafi
- Farhad Moshiri
- Shirin Neshat
- Faramarz Pilaram
- Leila Pazooki
- Behjat Sadr
- Hadie Shafie
- Esrafil Shirchi
- Keyvan Shovir
- Sasan Nasernia
- Parviz Tanavoli
- Hossein Zenderoudi

=== Iraq ===
- Ayad Alkadhi
- Shakir Hassan Al Said (b. 1925)
- Hassan Massoudy: One of the most famous calligraphers in the Middle East who revolutionised contemporary calligraphy. Many calligraffiti artists have credited their inspiration to him, such as El Seed.

=== Israel ===
- Pash Pollock: Israel based tattoo artist specializes in contemporary/ abstract art and calligraphy.
- Groc08: Israel based artist.

=== Italy ===
- Luca Barcellona
- Andrea Rafiki
- Warios Wrs

=== Japan ===
- Usugrow

=== Lebanon ===
- Etel Adnan (b. 1925)
- Yazan Halwani Lebanese artist from Beirut whose style combines oriental geometry, calligraphy, portraiture, and patterning. He is best known for creating large portraits of both famous and unknown people on murals in the Middle East and in places such as Singapore, Germany and France.
- Mohammad and Omar Kabbani, also known together as "Ashekman"

=== Malaysia ===
- Dhiya Roslan (Letterhythm)

=== Mexico ===
- Said Dokins - official calligraffiti ambassador
- Caner Oneros - official calligraffiti ambassador

=== Mongolia ===
- Ochirone

=== Morocco ===
- Tarek Benaoum

=== Norway ===
- Mister Gren - official calligraffiti ambassador
- SefrOne

=== Pakistan ===
- Sanki King (aka Abdullah Ahmed Khan)

=== Palestine ===
- Hamza Abu Ayyash
- Mohammad Omar

=== Peru ===
- Pienza
- Smoke

=== Philippines ===
- AJ Tabino - official calligraffiti ambassador

=== Poland ===
- Adam Romuald Kłodecki (THEOSONE) - official calligraffiti ambassador
- PowerScripts - official calligraffiti ambassador

=== Russia ===
- МИХАИЛ НОВОЖИЛОВ - official calligraffiti ambassador
- Kirill Plotnikov - official calligraffiti ambassador
- Misha No - official calligraffiti ambassador
- Stas Koorap - official calligraffiti ambassador

=== Saudi Arabia ===
- Abdulrahman Al-Nugamshi - a Saudi artist who was heavily influenced by Niels Shoe Meulman's use of materials.

=== South Korea ===
- Mogoora (모구라) - official calligraffiti ambassador
- Psycollapse (박지우) - official calligraffiti ambassador
- Romon Kimin Yang (aka Rostarr)

=== Spain ===
- Mr. Kams - official calligraffiti ambassador
- Mr. Ze - official calligraffiti ambassador

=== Sudan ===
- Assil Diab

=== Taiwan ===
- CreepyMouse - official calligraffiti ambassador

=== The Netherlands ===
- Niels Shoe Meulman
- Jasper6000

=== Tunisia ===
- El Seed A French Tunisian artist, he is the most well-known and active calligraffiti artist of the Middle East and an official Calligraffiti ambassador
- Inkman Graphic designer turned calligraffiti artist after he began to experiment with different mediums.
- Karim Jabbari
- Meen One

=== Turkey ===
- Dose OK: Turkey

=== United Kingdom ===
- Karl O’Brien - official calligraffiti ambassador
- Aerosol Arabic (aka Mohammed Ali) UK/ Bangladesh origins

=== United States ===
- Rayna Lo
- Chaz Bojorquez
- Retna
- Gabriel Garay US
- Tubs US
- Toni Youngblood
- Angel Ortiz (aka LA2/ LAROC): US
- Fred Brathwaite (aka Fab Five Freddy) US

=== Uncategorised ===
- Ruh al-Alam, a British artist who uses Arabic calligraphy and exposes in the Middle East; founder of the Islamic Calligraphic Artwork Project
- LightGraff
- Native & ZenTwO
- Puya Baghani (aka Sair A)
- Sun7 (aka Jonas Barnat)

== Exhibitions ==
In addition to solo exhibitions of individual street artists such as Declarations by el-Seed, a number of group exhibitions, showcasing the social and political importance of calligraffiti have been mounted by prestigious art museums and galleries have mounted exhibitions dedicated to street art and calligraffiti. These include:

- 2009 - 2010: Calligraffiti: Writing in Contemporary Chinese and Latino Art, Sept. 17, 2009 – Jan. 17, 2010 curated by Collette Chattopadhyay, Pacific-Asia Museum, Pasadena, California
- 2013: Arabic Graffiti & Egyptian Street Art in Frankfurt, April, 2013, Mainzer Landstraße, Güterplatz, Frankfurt
- 2013: Caligraffitti: 1984-2013, September 5 – October 5, 2013, Leiler Heller Gallery, Chelsea (2013)
- 2014: Calligraffiti: 1984–2013 Leila Heller Gallery: updated version of the original show.
- 2014: Calligraffiti – the first exhibit on calligraffiti in Los Angeles where New York graffiti artists and calligraphy artists from the Arab world came together to attempt to fuse the two styles together.
- 2014: New gallery Street Art Dubai, 2014, Jumeirah—Tashkeel Gallery, Dubai (el Seed)
- 2014: Contemporary Arabic Graffiti and Lettering: Photographs of a Visual Revolution, 2014, Houston, Texas
- 2014: Calligraffiti:Street Art, 1–31 July 2014, Jumeirah, Dubai
- 2015: Abstract Vandalism, 14 March–18 April 2015, Galerie Gabriel Rolt, Amsterdam, Netherlands

Recurring exhibitions

- Urban Art Biennial in Volklingen, Germany

== See also ==
- Asemic writing
- Djerbahood street art event
- El Seed
- Hurufiyya movement
- Islamic graffiti
- Niels Shoe Meulman

== Bibliography ==
- Zoghbi, Pascal; Stone; Hawley, Joy (2013). Arabic graffiti = Ghirāfītī ʻArabīyah. Berlin: From Here to Fame. ISBN 978-3-937946-45-0. OCLC 818463305.
- Meulman, Niels Shoe, (2012) Calligraffiti: The Graphic Art of Niels Shoe Meulman.
