= Mirza Mohammad Reza Kalhor =

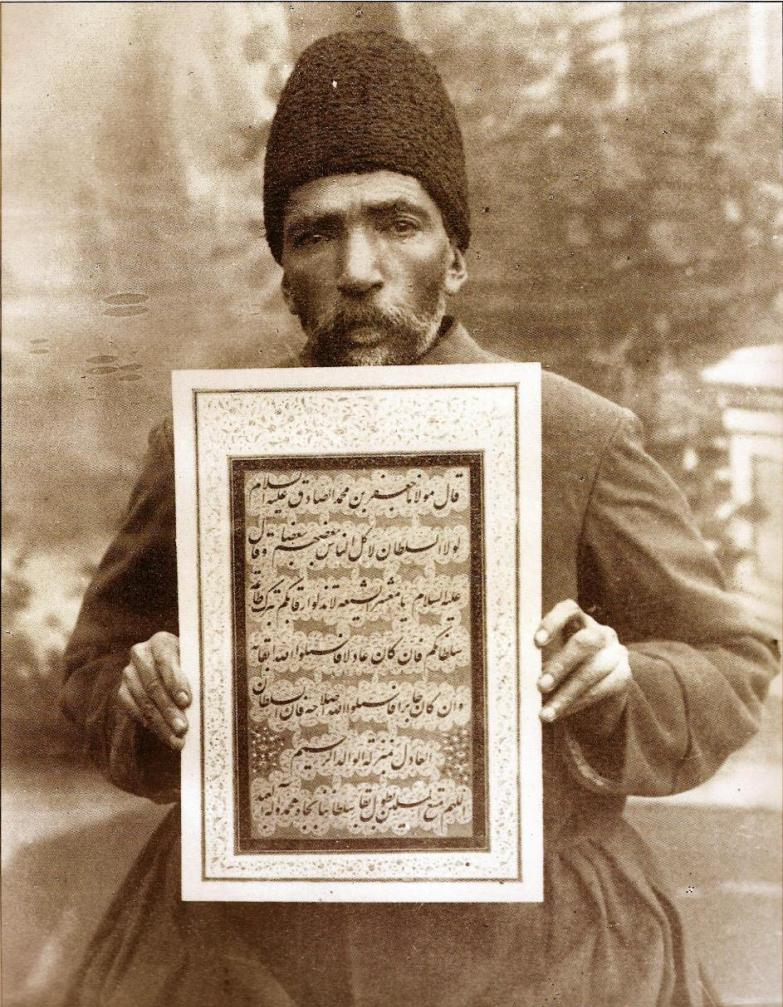
- Born: c. 1829; Kermanshah, Iran
- Died: 1892; Tehran, Iran
- Resting place: Ḥasanābād cemetery
- Known for: Calligraphy
- Style: Nastaʿlīq script technique
- Children: 9

Mirza Reza Kalhor (Persian: محمدرضا کلهر; c. 1829 – 1892) was a 19th-century Iranian calligrapher, known for his mastery of the Nastaʿlīq script technique.

A member of the Kurdish Kalhor tribe of Kermanshah, he initially followed the typical tribal path, learning horsemanship and sharpshooting. He gained an interest in calligraphy as a child, and left the tribe for further training. During his career, he introduced several innovations to Nastaʿlīq calligraphy, changing both the aesthetics and mechanics of the technique.

Kalhor modified and adapted Nastaʿlīq to be easily used with printing machines and newspaper lithography, which in turn helped wide dissemination of his transcripts. He also devised methods for teaching Nastaʿlīq and specified clear proportional rules for it, which many could follow.

He died of cholera in Tehran at age 65, having sired nine children and taught many calligraphy students, several of whom went on to become notable in their own right. He was buried in Ḥasanābād cemetery.

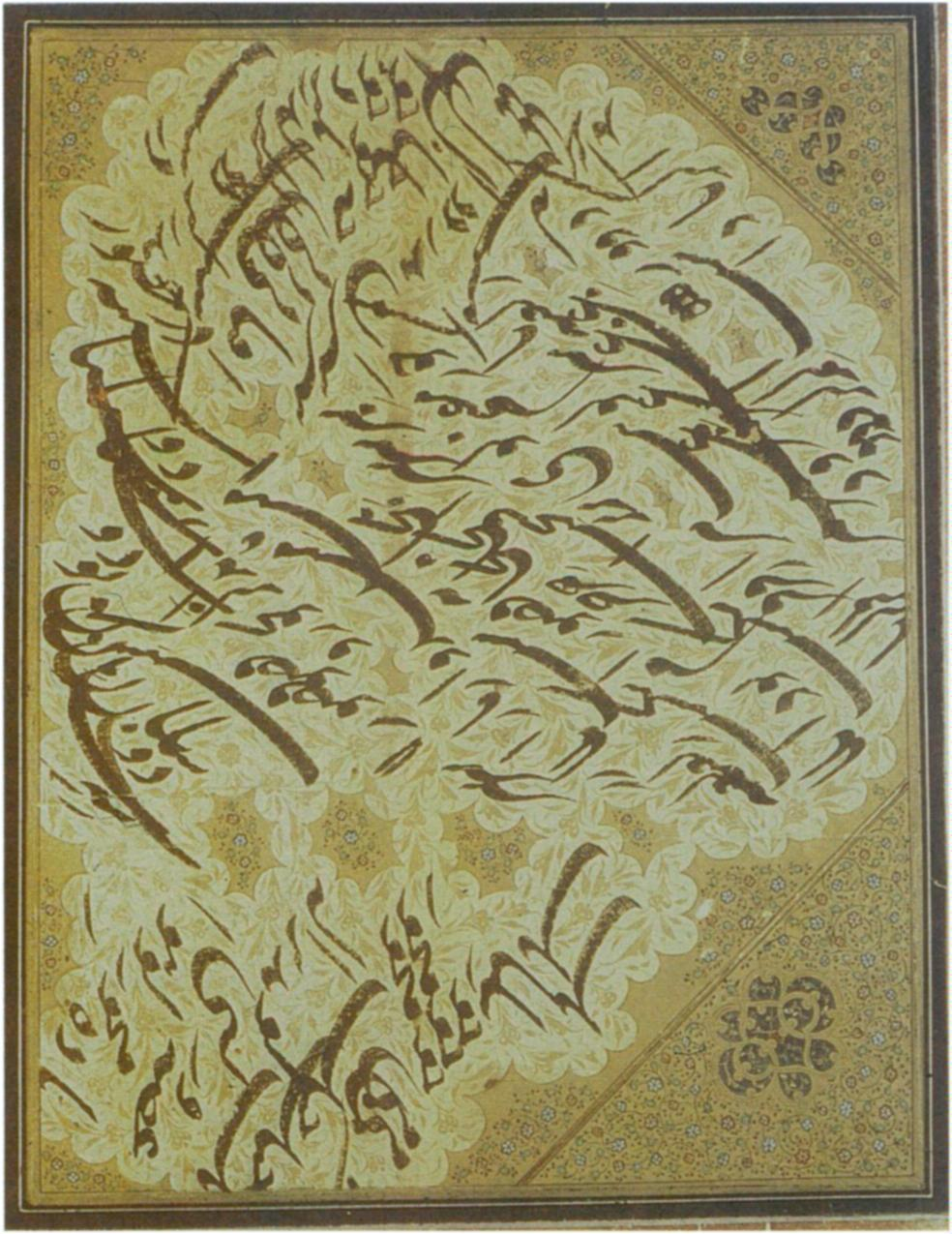
Page of mashq. 'Ali Jamasb Collection, Tehran

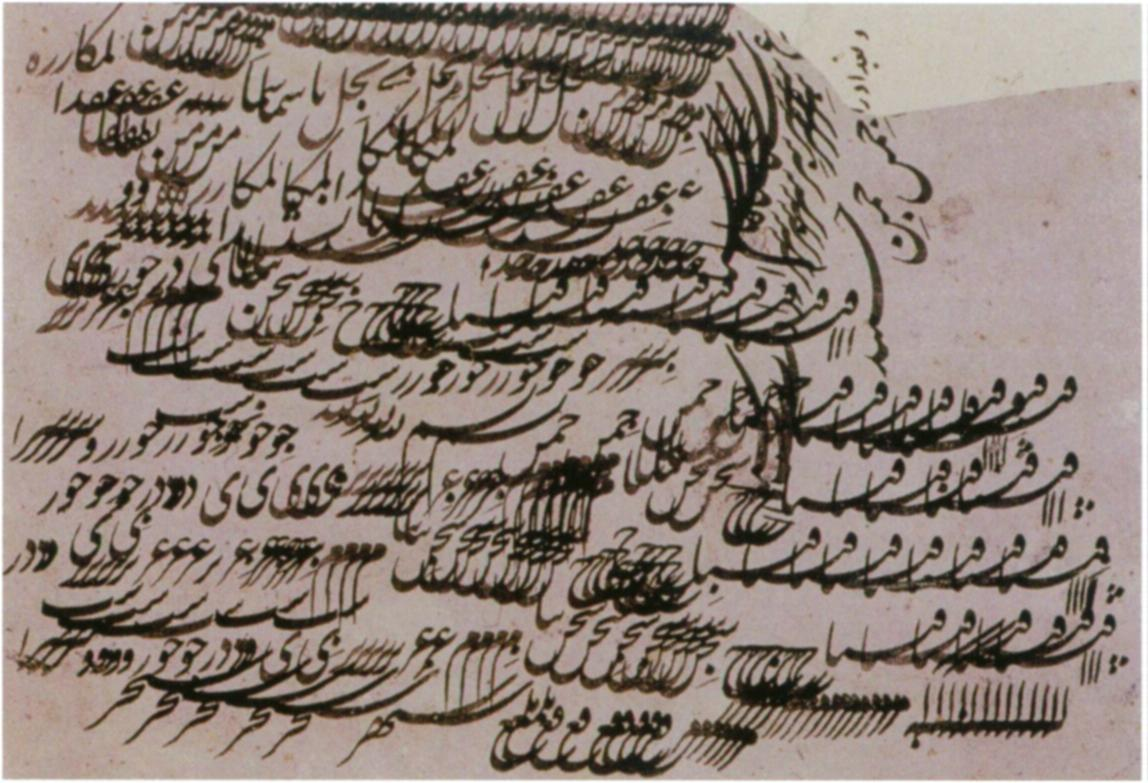
Page of mashq. Private Collection, Tehran

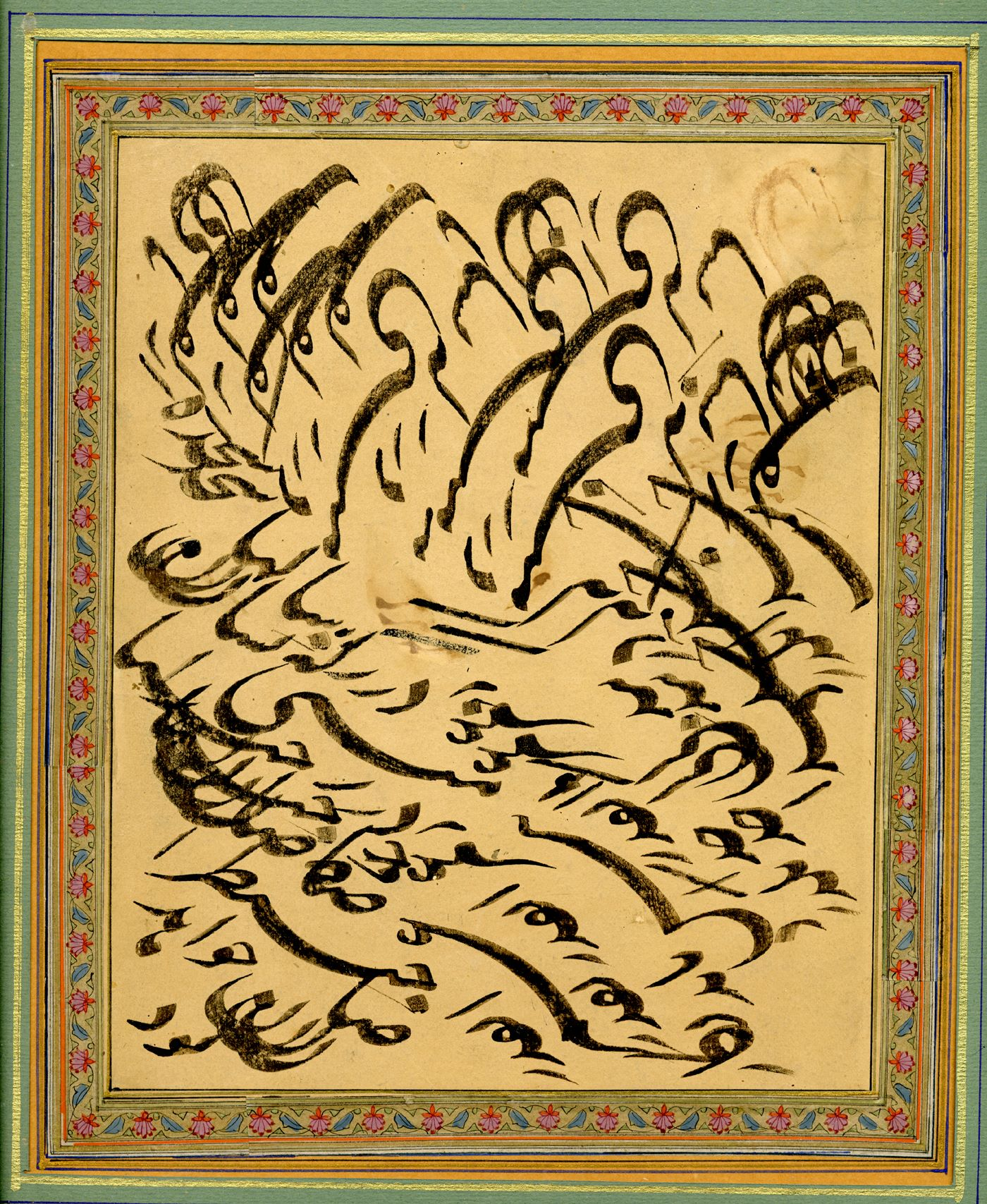
Page of mashq. Archive of Iran's Association of Calligraphers
