= Niels Shoe Meulman =

Dutch artist (born 1967)

Niels "Shoe" Meulman
- Born: 25 September 1967 (age 58); Amsterdam, Netherlands
- Style: Graffiti; calligraffiti
- Website: nielsshoemeulman.com

Niels "Shoe" Meulman (born 25 September 1967) is a Dutch visual artist, graffiti writer, graphic designer, and art director associated with graffiti and calligraffiti.

== Biography ==
=== Early life and graffiti career ===
Meulman was born in 1967 in Amsterdam, Netherlands. In 1979, he began his career as a graffiti artist under the tag name "Shoe". During the 1980s, Meulman met many New York artists visiting the Netherlands, including DONDI, Rammellzee, and Haze. Inspired by New York-style graffiti, he joined the crew Crime Time Kings with French artist Bando and British artist Mode2.

Meulman met Keith Haring in 1986, when Haring observed Meulman's wall piece Better Times. Meulman recalled, "Keith drew something in my black book. Which ended up stolen, but I managed to get it back a couple of years later – but without his drawing for me. That drawing turned up at a Christie's auction in 1994 and was bought by a French collector."

=== Graphic design and advertising ===
From 1989 to 1992, Meulman was an apprentice with the Dutch graphic designer Anthon Beeke. Later, he ran his own design company, Caulfield & Tensing, with Michael Schaeffer, supported by startup funds from internet entrepreneur Walter De Brouwer.

== Commercial work and collaborations ==
Meulman's commercial work includes sneaker design for the British sports brand Umbro, creative direction for WAVE magazine, a rebranding project of the Dutch television channel TMF, and packaging calligraphy for Bols Jenever drinks.

In 2012, Meulman participated in the Muhammad Ali—The Greatest Words tribute video series for Louis Vuitton, where spoken-word artist Yasiin Bey recited Ali's speeches while Meulman provided calligraphic imagery. Bey commented, "When we were asked to pose as boxers in the ring for the Louis Vuitton videos, [Meulman] said the words 'strike a poser.' Shoe is a painter of words."

=== Footwear design ===
With the help of shoe design company United Nude, the "Unruly Shoe" was designed, which "measures in at five inches tall and features details like laser-cut leather (which spells the words 'unruly shoe'), a back zipper, and a spiked stiletto heel."

== Calligraffiti ==
In 2007, Meulman held a solo exhibition in Amsterdam under the title Calligraffiti, describing his hybrid practice combining elements of calligraphy and graffiti; subsequently, art critics and designers have discussed the term in the context of urban art.

Since then, his calligraffiti pieces (signed "NSM") have been displayed in various exhibitions across Europe and North America. In March 2010, his book Calligraffiti—the Graphic Art of Niels Shoe Meulman was published by From Here to Fame Publishing in Berlin. John Langdon, an ambigram artist, wrote the preface and discusses the first time he met Meulman and saw his work: "You are as good as me. Only I did more."

=== Reception ===
Eye magazine, the international review of graphic design, reviewed the book in their Summer 2010 issue. They wrote: "As journalist and editor Adam Eeuwens explains in his introduction, calligraffiti is a 'curious amalgam of an ancient, refined art form fused with the raw force of modern street art [...] a synthesis of opposites.' The book explores Meulman's capacity to express written comparisons in a viscerally understandable form. Pairings range from love/money to strict/loose to rural/urban. All bearing additional dimensions of visual irony and depth. The illustrative nature of Meulman's words makes their apprehension feel less like reading than hearing understood so quickly that they are impossible to ignore or shut out. Beyond the cacophony is a reserve of pent-up energy, an abhorrence of complacency, and a crisp exploration of contrast mediated by masterful craft."

=== Later position ===
In 2015, Meulman issued a statement through Galerie Gabriel Rolt expressing his intention for calligraffiti to evolve beyond his personal practice, noting that the term no longer reflected his own abstract style.

=== Collections ===
Miami's Museum of Graffiti described Meulman's work as part of the global urban contemporary art movement. The museum holds Meulman’s artwork within the permanent collection, as do the Stedelijk Museum in Amsterdam and the San Francisco Museum of Modern Art, along with some private collectors.

== Unruly Gallery ==
In 2011, Meulman founded Unruly Gallery with Adele Renault, in Staatsliedenbuurt, Amsterdam. Since 2014, the gallery has held online exhibitions only.

== Abstract vandalism ==
In 1986, the Dutch daily newspaper NRC Handelsblad ran a full-page interview with Meulman with the headline "Ik ben een vandaal" ('I am a vandal').

In 2012, Berlin publishing house From Here to Fame published Niels Shoe Meulman: Painter, describing his work as "an avalanche of visual poetry and poetic visuals. A story about an artist who rejected being called an artist, but [...] became a globetrotting painter after all… where street art meets abstract expressionism. Messing up book sections. Again."

Design professor and fellow lettering artist Peter Gilderdale wrote in the introduction of the book, "In his art, the graphic designer, the calligrapher, and the tagger blend into a single entity. […] Artists from Kandinsky through Jackson Pollock have played with this synesthetic overlap of sound and vision, and Shoe's pieces similarly juxtapose multiple fields and connect multiple spheres of practice. Here gesture, culture, and concept coalesce in a complex contemporary mix that signals it as art for today."

Meulman has commented, "When I was younger, I wanted to design typefaces. But when I realized how much work that entailed, I became a calligrapher. And when I realized how much work that entailed, I became a painter. Now I realize that abstract painting is the hardest work of all. I am a painter who uses the skills of type design, lettering, and calligraphy."

In 2015, Galerie Gabriel Rolt presented the group exhibition Abstract Vandalism, curated by Meulman and featuring new works by Egs, Nug, and himself. The show was accompanied by a catalogue of the same name, published by Unruly Publishing, including a manifesto by Meulman: "It's my uneducated guess that half of all emerging visual artists had, at some point used the street as a medium. To group all these artists as one movement is nonsense. True, graffiti/street art is the only undeniable art movement since pop art, but where urban attitude was once a unifier, now ideas and styles are very divided. It's time for a separate direction, we call Abstract Vandalism."
