= Sanki King =

Pakistani artist

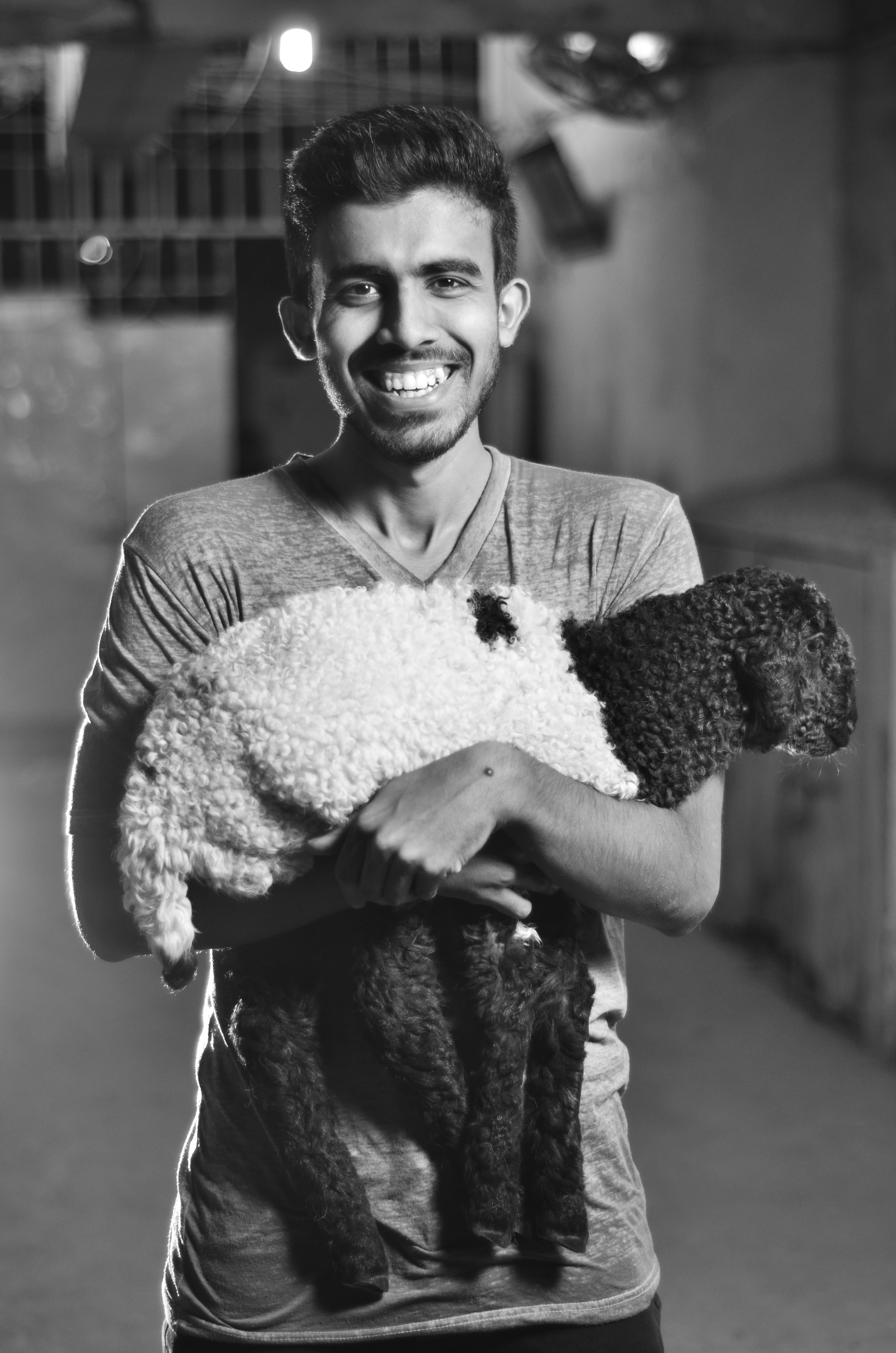
- King in 2015
- Born: Abdullah Ahmed Khan; 1990 (age 35–36); Jeddah, Saudi Arabia
- Known for: Graffiti, Calligraffiti, Public art, Sticker art, Parkour
- Website: sankiking.com

Abdullah Ahmed Khan (Urdu: عبداللہ احمد خان, born 1990), professionally known as Sanki King, is a Pakistani graffiti, calligraffiti and street artist based in Karachi. He also works in sticker art, b-boying and parkour.

== Early life ==
Sanki King was born in Jeddah, Saudi Arabia, where his father worked at the Islamic Development Bank, and was raised in Karachi, Pakistan.

== Career ==
While playing Counter-Strike as a teenager, another player described him as sanki — an Urdu word meaning eccentric or slightly mad — and he adopted it as his moniker. In 2008, he was photographed by Tapu Javeri while freerunning in a park in Karachi, and subsequently performed at the launch of Style 360. From 2011, he began selling artwork and painting commissioned murals.

=== Graffiti ===
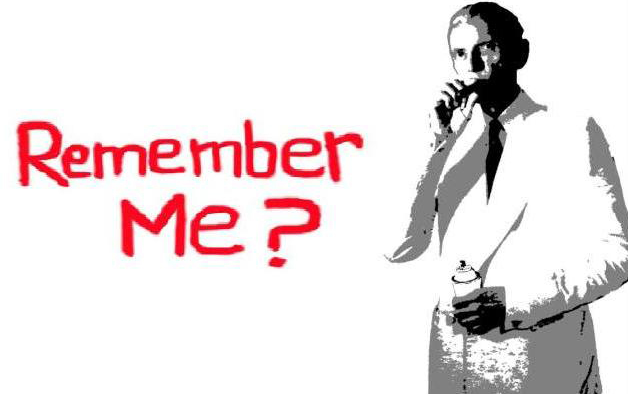
First art sticker created by Sanki King which features the founder of Pakistan, Mohammad Ali Jinnah

In July 2012, King performed live graffiti art and launched a Sticker Art Movement featuring designs of Muhammad Ali Jinnah, the founder of Pakistan. In December 2012, he was selected as a judge for a nationwide graffiti competition held across seven cities. His works include Love Karachi, painted on a bus, and Flying Kiss, painted outside the Arts Council of Pakistan in 2013. In 2014, he painted a large-scale mural at the Valika Cricket Ground, University of Karachi. In June 2016, he held his first solo exhibition, You Should Know Him By Now, at the Sanat Gallery in Clifton, Karachi.

King is the only Pakistani artist to have been invited to join the graffiti crews Beyond Mankind Krew (BMK, founded 1991, Queens, New York City) and Experienced Vandals (Ex-Vandals, founded 1979, Brooklyn). His work is featured in Nicholas Ganz's book Street Messages, published in April 2015.

In 2017, he collaborated with Mumbai-based artist Zeenat Kulavoor on Pehle Aap, an Urdu calligraphic conversation project. He also participated in Karachi Biennale 2017 with the work Mind Palace.

=== Gallery art ===
An original abstract work by King was included in a group exhibition at the Louvre Abu Dhabi from February to June 2021.

=== Fashion collaborations ===
In 2014, King collaborated with designer brand Zeb-Tan. He subsequently worked with The House of Arsalan Iqbal on the collection Desirably Distressed, released in March 2015. A further collection, Devolution Chic, incorporating his designs in footwear and jewellery, was presented at the 8th PFDC Sunsilk Fashion Week in April 2015.

=== B-boying and parkour ===
In 2008, King founded a b-boying crew in Karachi, which organised as Unknown Crew (UC) in 2010. The crew has performed for Jaag TV, HP Inc, Caltex, Play TV and the Lux Style Awards, among others.

== See also ==
- List of street artists

== Sources ==
- Jabbar, Ammara (1 July 2016). "You Should Know Him By Now". ArtNow Pakistan.
- Husain, Marjorie (12 June 2016). "Portfolio: The writing on the wall". Dawn.
- Salman, Peerzada (7 June 2016). "We Should Know Him By Now". Dawn.
- Shaikh, Umer (6 June 2016). "Words On Walls Are Read More Than Those In Books". The News International.
- Ganz, Nicholas (1 April 2015). Street Messages. Stockholm: Dokument Press. ISBN 9789185639731.
