= Hassan Massoudy =

Iraqi painter and calligrapher (born 1944)

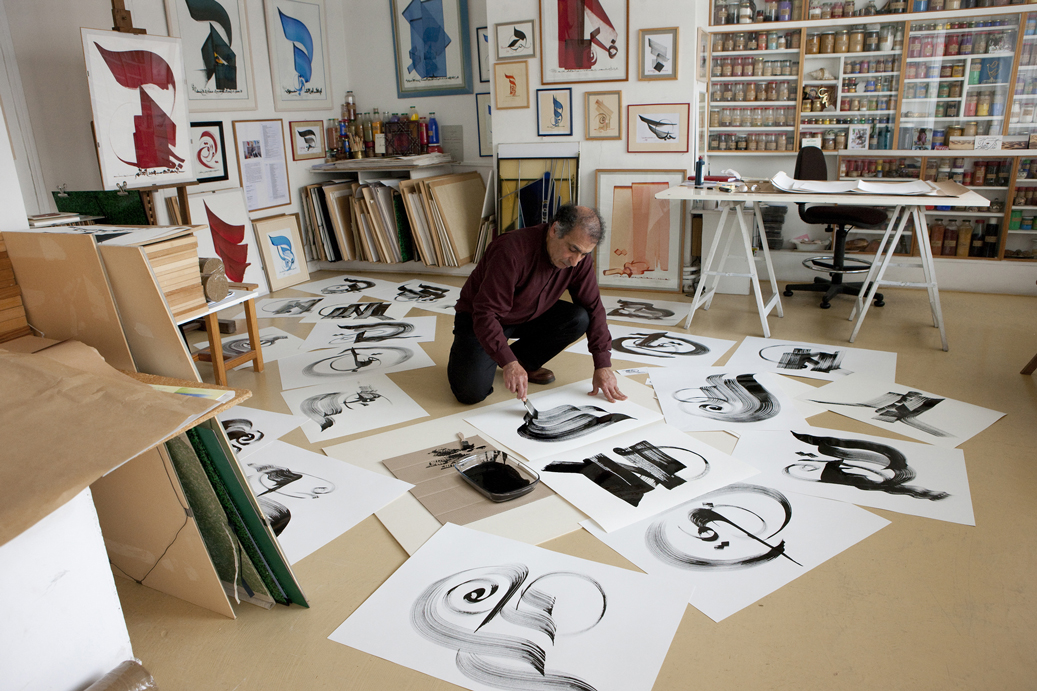
- Hassan Massoudy in his workshop, 2016
- Born: حسن المسعود الخطاط; 1944 (age 81–82); Najaf, Iraq
- Education: Ecole des Beaux-Arts, Paris
- Known for: Painter, calligrapher, illustrator
- Movement: Hurufiyya movement

Hassan Massoudy (حسن المسعود الخطاط; born 1944) is an Iraqi painter and calligrapher, considered by the French writer Michel Tournier as the "greatest living calligrapher", who currently lives in Paris. His work has influenced a generation of calligraffiti artists.

== Early life ==
Hassan Massoudy was born in 1944 in Najaf, central Iraq, and grew up in a traditional society. He moved to Baghdad in 1961, where he was apprenticed to various calligraphers and exhibited a talent for classic Arabic calligraphy.

== Career ==
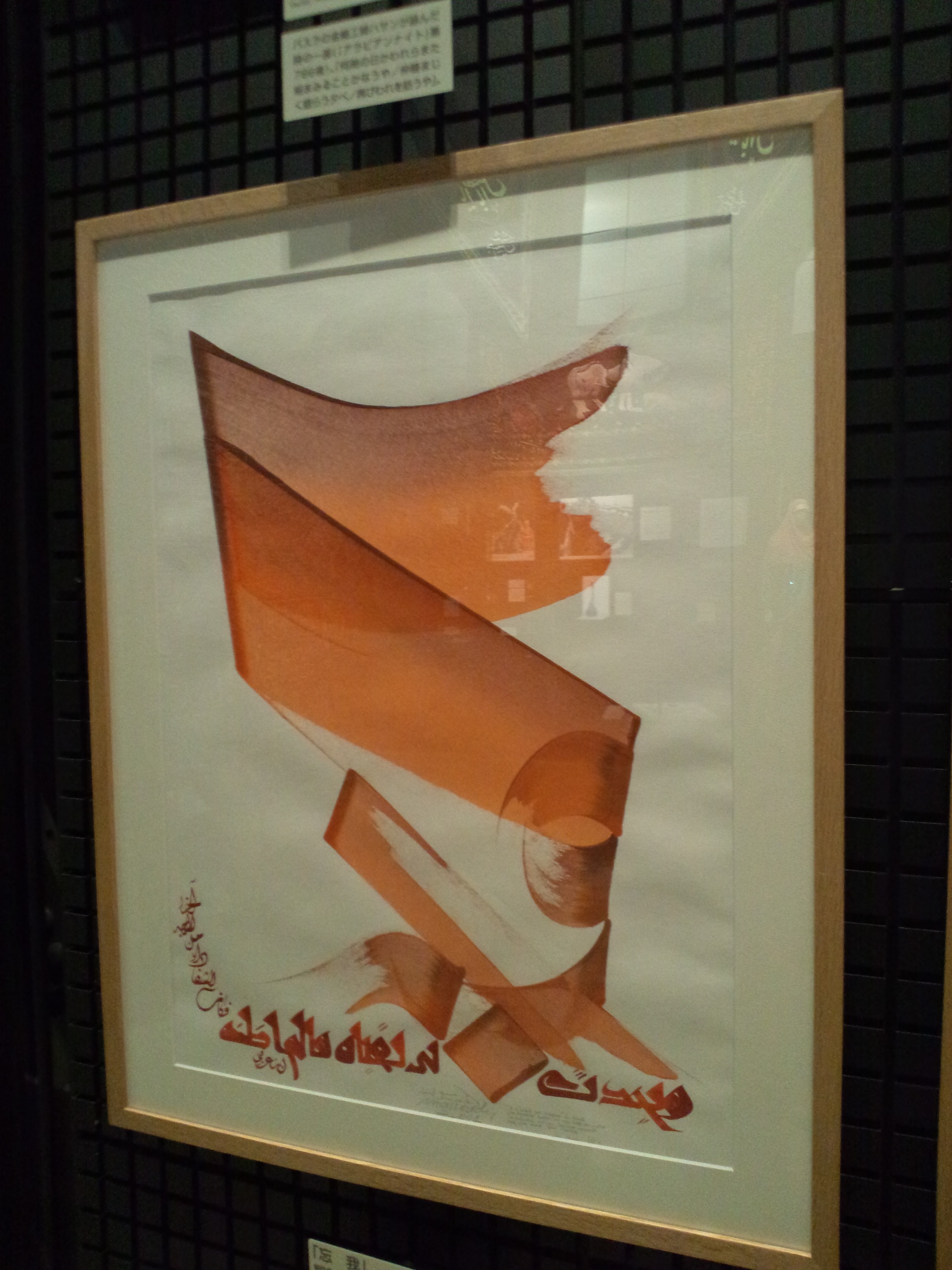
"Ecstasy" (Al-Wajd) by Hassan Massoudy, 2001

In 1969, he fled Iraq for France, and after arriving in Paris, he entered the École des Beaux-Arts where he studied figurative painting. However, he continued to work on calligraphy and paid for his studies by creating calligraphic headlines for Arabic magazines.

In 1972, he created, with the actor Guy Jacquet and later the musician Fawzi Al Aiedy, Arabesque, a public performance combining music, poetry, and live calligraphy projected on a screen.

He collaborated with couturier Azzedine Alaïa for his Autumn-Winter collection 1986/1987. In 1995, he was involved in the design of the stage set for the ballet "Selim" with the dancer Kader Belarbi from the Opera de Paris and the singer Houria Aichi on a choreography from Kalemenis.

In 2005, he met the dancer and choreographer Carolyn Carlson and the musician Kudsi Erguner. Together with three other dancers and three other musicians, they created the show "Metaphore", a harmony of music, dance, and calligraphy.

Massoudy has continued to live in France.

== Influence ==
Massoudy has become an important influence on a generation of calligraffiti artists. The Tunisian street artist, el Seed, who uses calligraphy in his art, points to the work of Iraqi painter, Hassan Massoudy, as a major source of inspiration, noting that "The work of Hassan Massoudy was totally out of anything I’ve seen from the way he shapes the letters to the colors he uses. He completely revolutionized the art of calligraphy."

== Work ==
Massoudy often uses quotations from classic and modern writers as the inspiration for his work. One such work is Woman is a Ray of Divine Light painted in 1987, which is based on the words of a 13th-century Sufi poet, Rumi. For Massoudy, reproducing a poem in calligraphy means more than simply presenting it in a particular style, it enables him to grasp the inner meaning of the words.

Massoudy explains:

[The calligrapher must] assimilate all aspects of culture that relate to [his art]. Practice awakens the knowledge gradually stored up in the body and releases the expression of a myriad of nuances. [Calligraphic] codes serve to control the internal excitement and prevent his feelings from overflowing... but the calligrapher must pass beyond these set rules. To achieve his aim, he must first conform to these restrictions and then go beyond them. This is because a true calligraphic composition must contain something indefinable, something elusive and powerful that takes it beyond the rules.

Writer and illustrator:

- Calligraphies of the Desert, Saqi Books
- Calligraphies of Love, Saqi Books
- The Calligrapher's Garden, Saqi Books
- Calligraphie arabe vivante, Flammarion
- Désir d'envol, une vie en calligraphie, Albin Michel
- Sinbad le marin, trois voyages, Alternatives
- Si loin de l'Euphrate, Albin Michel
- L'ABCdaire de la calligraphie arabe, Flammarion
- Calligraphies d'amour, Albin Michel
- Le chemin d'un calligraphe, Phébus
- Hassan Massoudy calligraphe, Flammarion

Illustrator:

- Le vin, le vent, la vie, choix de poèmes, Actes Sud
- L'histoire de Gilgamesh, Alternatives
- Toi, mon infinitude, Albin Michel
- Calligraphie pour l'homme, Alternatives
- Écrire la paix, une calligraphie arabe de la paix, Le Pouce Et L'Index
- L'harmonie parfaite d'Ibn ´Arabî, Albin Michel
- Calligraphie du désert, Alternatives
- Les quatrains de Rûmi, Albin Michel
- Le voyage des oiseaux, Alternatives
- La guerre sainte suprême de l'islam arabe, Fata Morgana
- Calligraphie de terre, Alternatives
- Le jardin perdu, Alternatives
- Antara, le poète du désert, 525-615, Alternatives
- Jouer à écrire en arabe - Graphisme, Concentration, Réflexion, Retz
- L'exil, extraits de "Consolation à Helvia, ma mère", Alternatives
- Un suspens de cristal, Fata Morgana
- Récit de l'exil occidental, Fata Morgana
- Le passant d'Orphalese extraits du livre "Le prophète", Syros
- Le vin, le vent, la vie, Sindbad
- Le Conte des conteurs, La Découverte

Translation:

- La voix de Schéhérazade, Fata Morgana

== See also ==
- Islamic calligraphy
- Islamic art
- List of Iraqi artists
