= The Mine (art gallery) =

The Mine is a Dubai based contemporary art gallery founded and directed by Sanaz Askari.

== About ==
Since its opening in November 2013, just as Dubai's win for the EXPO 2020 was announced, the space has been known to break down the city's commercial art scene by showcasing art that is accessible to art enthusiasts across the region. Known to exhibit artists whose works are often obscure and offbeat, ranging from bizarre sculptures to funky installations, The Mine has shaken up the local scene with a vast, ever changing collection of art that was otherwise overshadowed by more commercially successful artists.

The Mine is a warehouse made up of around six thousand square feet with two spacious floors. Every facet of the venue is unobtrusive, with waste items found around the industrial area molded into tables, chairs and reception desks. The space is also used as a platform where industry professionals can network.

== Exhibited artists ==
- Giovanni Leonardo Bassan
- L'ATLAS
- SUN7
- TANC
- Pez
- Bahareh Navabi
- Nazanin Pouyandeh
- Yasuaki Onishi
- Francisco De Pajaro
- L7M
- Pose & Revok
- Hamed Rashtian
- Arash Nazari
- Ivana Flores
- Babak Dehkordi
- Naeemeh Kazemi
- Btoy
- Frank&Robbert/Robbert&Frank
