= Inkman =

International artist and graphic designer

INKMAN
- اينكمان
- Born: Mohamed Kilani Tbib; 1990 (age 35–36); Tunisia
- Education: School of Design, Tunisia
- Years active: 2011–present
- Known for: Painting, murals, calligraffiti, graphic design
- Movement: Calligraphy

Mohamed Kilani Tbib (Arabic: اينكمان; born 1990), known as the INKMAN, is a Tunisian artist, muralist, calligraffiti artist, sculptor, jewellery designer and graphic designer.

== Early life and education ==
Mohamed Kilani Tbib was born in 1990 in Tunisia. He graduated from the high school of sciences and technologies of design in Denden-Tunis.

== Career ==
He started creating artwork in 2011, during the Arab Spring protests. In 2016–2017, he created a five-story tall mural in the United Arab Emirates for the Dubai Street Museum project, organized by Brand Dubai and curated by Rom Levy and Sanaz Askari. His first solo exhibition was in 2017 at Ghaya Gallery.

He has interests in typography and calligraphy, and he explores the Arabic and Latin alphabets. He tries to create works that are both visually interesting as well as incorporating messages and/or poems.

In 2023, he launched the "Happy" Sculpture in the Sahara Desert

== Guerlain ==
In 2022, he collaborated and designed the bottle for Guerlain's iconic perfume called, "The Bee Bottle".

== Kartell ==
In 2024, he collaborated with the Italian brand Kartell to design the exclusive Louis Ghost Chair collection.

== Huawei ==
In 2025, he joined forces with the global Brand Huawei to launch their latest devices.

== Exhibitions ==
INKMAN has showcased his work in several notable solo exhibitions, including "KINGDOM OF LETTERS", "PARADISE", "EVERYTHING IS WHITE" and ''WISH'', each reflecting his distinct exploration of calligraphy.

== Art of Jewellery ==
In 2023, INKMAN launched his fine jewellery line.

== Media Coverage ==
- https://www.i24news.tv/en/news/middle-east/culture/1662541062-tunisian-artist-blends-inspirations-into-calligraffiti
- https://www.dw.com/en/tunisia-artists-caught-between-terror-and-bureaucracy/a-18889641
- https://www.apollo-magazine.com/art-dubai-fair-report-2023/
- https://www.discovertunisia.com/en/success-stories/inkman
- https://magzoid.com/inkman-tunisias-talented-calligraffiti-artist-graphic-designer/
- https://www.wikiparfum.com/en/fragrances/flacon-aux-abeilles-by-inkman-2022
- https://fr.africanews.com/2022/09/07/tunisie-inkman-reinvente-la-calligraphie-arabe-avec-guerlain/
- https://www.barrons.com/news/tunisian-artist-inkman-finds-fame-with-traditional-calligraphy-01662583227
- https://lofficieluk.com/format/AVisualPoem.php?id=384&&table_name=master_table
