= Adele Renault =

Belgium fine artist

- Education: Académie Royale des Beaux-Arts
- Known for: Visual Art, Murals
- Website: www.adelerenault.com

Adele Renault is a visual artist and muralist, known for her hyper- and photo-realistic paintings from smaller works on canvas and large-scale public pieces. She was born in Liège, Belgium. Renault's work is a combination of traditional and contemporary techniques.

== Career ==
Renault was born in 1988, and raised in the Belgian Ardennes. Her father is Jean-Christophe Renault, a composer and pianist, and her mother is Véronique Gillet, a composer and guitarist. Her sister is the singer and pianist Mathilde Renault.

Renault has lived and studied in different countries. She studied visual arts from classical oil painting to modern spray can graffiti, while experimenting with new media and graphic design. Renault graduated in 2010 from the Académie Royale des Beaux-Arts in Brussels.

Many of her paintings have plant and animal imagery. When speaking on her Plantasia series, she emphasised her connection to plants, and how her mum taught her how to grow her own food. When painting murals of birds and bird feathers in her series Gutter Paradise, she stated that the feathers had "become [her] own language".

== Retrospective ==
=== Exhibitions ===
- 2022 - Bananas solo show at Moberg Gallery, Des Moines, IA, USA
- 2022 - Santa Fe solo show, Artist residency at Fundación Yguales, Santa Fe, NM, USA
- 2021 - Plantasia - Birds of Paradise solo show at Galerie Quai 4, Liege, Belgium
- 2021 - Figure and Form at Moberg Gallery, Des Moines, IA, USA
- 2020 - Sway group show at Moberg Gallery, Des Moines, IA, USA.
- 2020 - Un détail devenu sujet solo show with PDP Gallery/Urban Art Fair, Paris, France.
- 2019 - Crossing Lines group show at PDP Gallery, Los Angeles, CA, USA
- 2019 - In Bloom group show at Moberg Gallery, Des Moines, IA, USA
- 2019 - Where art you? group show at PDP Gallery, Los Angeles, CA, USA
- 2019 - 25: In Black & White group show curated by Juxtapoz, Miami, FL, USA
- 2018 - Tyson's Corner solo show at Ring Side Lounge, Jersey City, NJ, United States.
- 2018 - Urban Legends group show at Antler Gallery, Portland, OR, USA
- 2017 - ONSET group show at First Amendment Gallery, San Francisco, USA
- 2017 - Unruly Suspects at Unruly Gallery, Amsterdam
- 2016 - Les Hommes Intègres solo show at Galerie Droste, Germany
- 2016 - Group show at Tinney Contemporary, Nashville, USA
- 2016 - D'après Nature Group show at Musée des Beaux-Arts de Verviers, Belgium
- 2016 - Group show at Newcastle Cathedral, Newcastle, UK. Curated by Unit 44.
- 2016 - Group show at Gallery Vriend van Bavink, Amsterdam, Netherlands
- 2015 - 3D trio show at Yoko Uhoda Gallery, Liege, Belgium
- 2015 - November/December, Campthepigeon solo show at Havas, Chicago, USA.
- 2014 - Adele Renault: Pigeon Voyageur solo show at Galerie Droste, Germany.
- 2014 - Les Clochards Célestes solo show at White Walls, San Francisco.

=== Public art ===
- 2022 - Mural commissioned by the Stavelot Cultural Center, Belgium
- 2022 - Mural commissioned by the City of Gent, Belgium
- 2022 - Indoor installation of 9 panels commissioned by CHU Hospital, Liege, Belgium
- 2021 - Parlement Wallonie-Bruxelles, Brussels, Belgium
- 2021 - Mural commissioned by Torhout Cultural Center, Torhout, Belgium
- 2021 - Mural commissioned by Vectura, Beauchamp, France
- 2021 - Mural for New Brighton, Liverpool, UK
- 2020 - Mural for Maryland council, London, UK
- 2020 - Mural for Artscape festival, Linkoping, Sweden
- 2020 - Mural for Art Public, commissioned by Wallonia region, Liege, Belgique
- 2019 - Murals on deck 16 and 17 of first Virgin Voyage cruiseship, Genoa, Italie
- 2019 - Mural for Own Media, Los Angeles, CA, USA
- 2019 - Mural in Lodi Art District, New Delhi, India
- 2018 - Indoor mural commissioned by Facebook, Northridge, CA, USA
- 2018 - Mural for Sir Hotels, Amsterdam, Netherlands
- 2018 - Indoor mural for BNP Paribas real estate headquarters, Paris, France
- 2018 - Rock Werchter festival, Curated by Arne Quinze, Werchter, Belgium
- 2017 - Various murals for CIM Group, Los Angeles, CA, USA
- 2017 - Temporary mural for Lollapalooza Festival, Berlin, Germany
- 2016 - STRAAT Museum, Amsterdam, Netherlands
- 2016 - Urban Nation Museum, Berlin, Germany
- 2016 - Mural commissioned by Area environment, Miami design district, Miami, FL, USA

=== Printed publications ===
- 2022 - Plantasia Series, Artist; Adele Renault, Introduction: Alexandre Latscha, Publisher: Moberg Gallery, Distributor: SCB Distributors, ISBN 978-82-18-03608-0
- 2020 - Gutter Paradise by Adele Renault, Introduction: Alexandre Latscha, Publisher: PDP gallery, Distributor: SCB Distributors, ISBN 978-90-828907-1-6
- 2018 - Feathers and Faces by Adele Renault, Introduction: Carlo McCormick, Publisher: Adele Renault, Distributor: SCB Distributors, ISBN 978-90-828907-0-9

=== Articles & interviews ===
- 2023 - Interception Urban Art, interview online ‘Known from London to L.A. we met de great Adele Renault in Brussels’
- 2022 - Vroom and Varossieau, interview ‘Adele Renault interview'
- 2022 - This is Colossal, article by Grace Ebert ‘Massive Leafy Murals by Adele Renault’
- 2022 - The Chrystel Ship, article ‘Adele Renault’
- 2022 - Galaxy of Art, article and interview video ‘Artist of the moment… Adele Renault'
- 2022 - Le Vif, interview (in French) ‘Portrait Adele Renault sa plus grosse claque son plus gros risque son mantra'
- 2021 - My Modern Met, article by Margherita Cole ‘Giant rainbow Murals inspired by the secret colors of pigeon feathers’
- 2021 - As Adverture, article (in Dutch) ‘De graffitiartieste die schoonheid vindt waar een ander vergeet te kijken’
- 2021 - Street Art News, article ‘Plantasia’
- 2021 - New Bright on Streetart, article and interview video ‘Adele Renault’
- 2021 - Brooklyn Street Art, interview ‘Adele Renault grows a new garden: “Call it Plantasia”’
- 2021 - Lumières de la Ville, article (in French) Street artiste Adele Renault pigeons ville’
- 2021 - Monochronicle, article ‘’Adele Renault’
- 2021 - Stadt Gent, article (in Dutch) 'Adele Renault’
- 2020 - London Mural Festival, article ‘Adele Renault'
- 2020 - Mu in the City, article (in French) ‘Adele Renault debate sa fresque dans le cadre d’art public Liege’
- 2019 - The American Pigeon Museum, article ‘Adele Renault’
- 2019 - Collater, article ‘Adele Renault, hyper-realistic street art in Delhi’
- 2018 - Mixed Grill, article (in Dutch) ‘Reusachtige duiven van Adele Renault’
- 2018 - Brooklyn Street Art, article ‘Martha Cooper and Adele Renault: Pigeon fancier in Moscow’
- 2017 - Sircle Collection, article by Claudia Fuggetti ‘Sir Albert's New Mural by Adele Renault’
- 2017 - Urban Nation, article ‘Adele’
- 2016 - Hotbook, article (in Spanish) ‘Adele Renault’
- 2016 - Art is just a Four Letter Word - Gallery, article (in German) ‘Adele Renault - Les Hommes Integres’
- 2016 - Straatmuseum, article (in Dutch) ‘Gutter Paradise’
- 2015 - Widewalls, article by Miljard Ficpatrik: ‘Adele Renault on Her Artistic Journey and Passion for Pigeons’
- 2015 - This is Colossal, article by Christopher Jobson ‘Hatched from a Discarded Egg on a Chicago Windowsill, ‘Camp’ the Pigeon Becomes a Muse for Adele Renault’s Giant Oil Paintings’
- 2014 - Dutch Culture USA, 'Adele Renault’s solo at White Walls in SF'
