= Assil Diab =

Sudanese visual artist (born 1988)

- أسيل دياب
- Born: 1988 (age 37–38); Bucharest, Socialist Republic of Romania
- Education: Virginia Commonwealth University
- Movement: Graffiti
- Website: Assil اصيل Diab on Instagram

Assil Diab (Arabic: أسيل دياب) (1988) is a Sudanese visual artist, graphic designer and graffiti artist, based in United States.

== Biography ==
=== Early life and education ===
Assil Diab was born in Romania and moved with her parents to Qatar as a child. She attended the Virginia Commonwealth University in Qatar and in Richmond, Virginia, USA, and graduated in 2011 with a Bachelor of Fine Arts in graphic design. She also holds a diploma in Digital Marketing and Advanced Social Media Marketing.

=== Career ===
Since her graduation she has worked as a freelance graphic designer and graffiti artist, designing logos and branding for companies as well as commissioned to paint the walls of restaurants, cafes, shops and businesses.

Diab works as a freelance graphic designer and graffiti artist. She has been called the first female graffiti artist in Qatar and in Sudan. Before she moved into freelancing as a graffiti artist, she worked at Doha Film Institute (DFI) and for Al Jazeera Children's Channel.

In 2019, she went back to Sudan, where she undertook an artistic project to honour Sudan's protesting citizens, who lost their lives during the Sudanese revolution. For this project, she created murals of the victims on walls of their respective family homes.

In 2020, she won a dissemination award from UNESCO and i4policy for a self-initiated street art campaign she did on the coronavirus in Sudan. She has also been an honorary cultural Ambassador to Qatar Museums since 2018. In addition to spray painting on the walls of Sudan and Qatar, Assil's artwork has also been exhibited in Bahrain, Germany, Bangladesh, and the USA. Her work has also been published in books, including Artisans of the Middle East and “Dreesha”.

== Exhibitions ==
- LAS Charity Fashion Show with pop art exhibition by Assil Diab - Grand Regal Hotel (2013)
- Virginia Commonwealth University in Qatar
- Iwalewahaus Gallery in Bayreuth, Germany (2017)
- Red Bull's Artspace in Bahrain, called ‘Malja’ (2015 and 2016)
- Karmakol Festival in Sudan (2017)

== See also ==
- Visual arts of Sudan
