= L'Atlas =

French artist

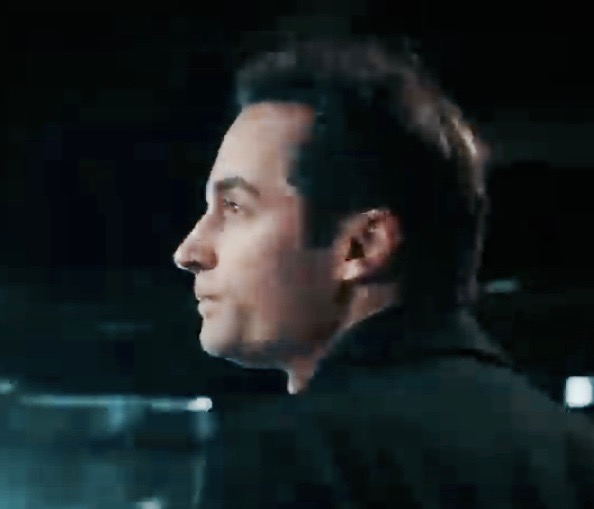
- L'Atlas in 2019
- Born: Jules Dedet; 1978 (age 47–48); France
- Occupation: Artist
- Father: Yann Dedet
- Website: latlas-art.org

Jules Dedet, also known as L'Atlas was born in France in 1978. He is a French painter, photographer and video artist who studied calligraphy, typography and editing for documentaries.

== Select exhibitions ==
=== Solo exhibitions ===
- 2007. I WAS HERE. Galerie Beaubourg, Paris.
- 2009. The way of art. ESA, Paris.
- 2010. L'ATLAS IS HERE. Mois de la Photo Off, Galerie G, Paris.

=== Collective exhibitions ===
- 2001. Street Art. Galerie du Jour, Paris.
- 2006. Ligne, Galerie Chappe, Paris
- 2007. Graphology. Palais de Tokyo, Paris.
- 2010. Strates. Maison des Arts, Créteil.
- 2015. "The Beach Beneath the Streets". The Mine, Dubai

=== Performances ===
- 2003. Maison du Japon, Venise.
- 2009. Surfaces actives. Art Beijing. Pékin.

=== Biennales and art fairs ===
- 2009. Cutlog / Contemporary Art Fair. Paris.
- 2010. SCOPE / New York Art Show, New York.
- 2010. Qui Vive / Moscow International Biennale for Young Art, Moscou.
- 2011. L'ATLAS vs TANC. Alliance Française, New Delhi.
