= Kareemgraphy =

Indian graffiti artist (born 1978)

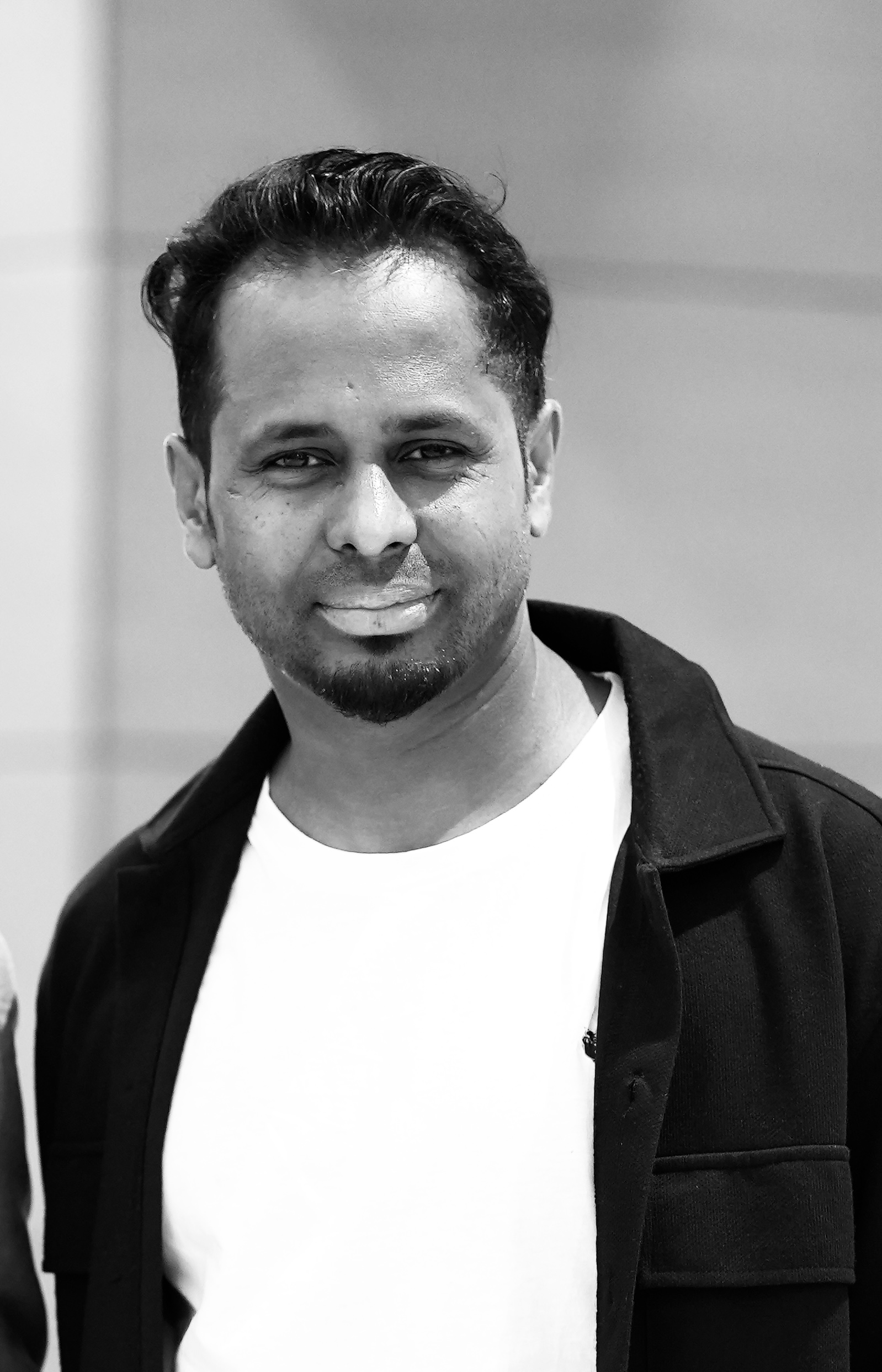
- Born: Abdul Kareem; 1978 (age 47–48); Kakkove, Malappuram, Kerala, India
- Occupations: Calligrapher, Calligraffiti artist, Designer
- Years active: 1996–present
- Known for: Arabic calligraphy, calligraffiti, public art installations, live performances
- Website: https://kareemgraphy.com

Abdul Kareem (known professionally as Kareemgraphy) is an Indian calligraffiti artist and designer born in Kakkove, Malappuram, based in Doha, Qatar. He is known for blending traditional Arabic calligraphy with contemporary graffiti-inspired forms. His works have appeared at major international events such as the FIFA World Cup Qatar 2022, the AFC Asian Cup 2023, and the Dubai World Cup in 2024.

== Early life ==
Kareemgraphy was born in Kakkove, a village in the Malappuram district of Kerala, India. His interest in Arabic calligraphy began at the age of six when his father brought home a calligraphic artwork depicting the Islamic prayer posture formed entirely with Arabic letters. The artwork left a strong impression and shaped his early fascination with the Arabic script.

He studied in local schools and madrasa classes, where he learned Quranic writing and the basics of Arabic lettering. Financial limitations forced him to discontinue formal art education at the age of eighteen, after which he worked as a signboard and hoarding painter to support his family.

== Early Works Gallery ==
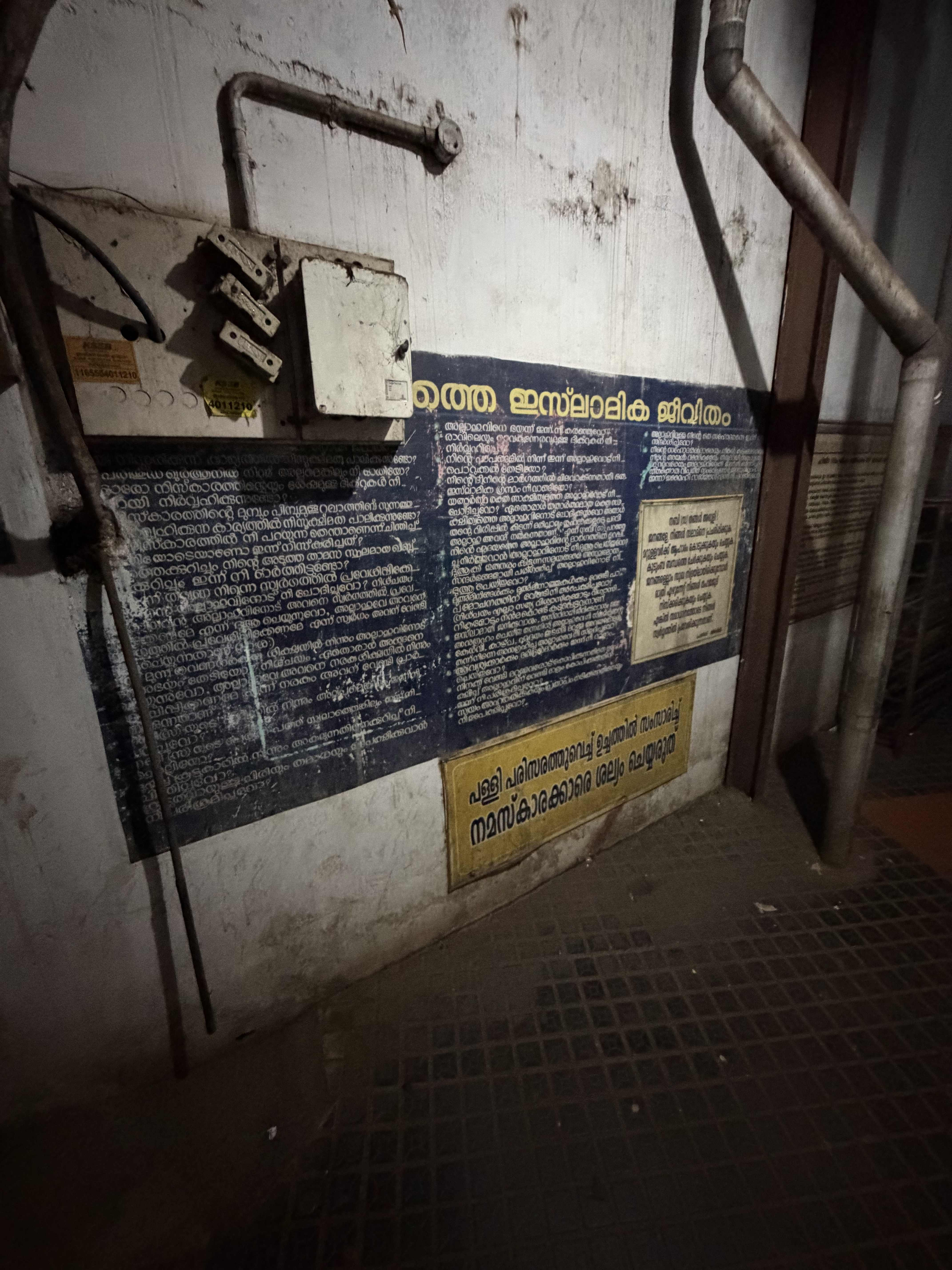
Wall Art (ചുമരെഴുത്ത്) by Kareemgraphy, created approximately 25 years ago at Edavannappara Mosque, Malappuram, Kerala.

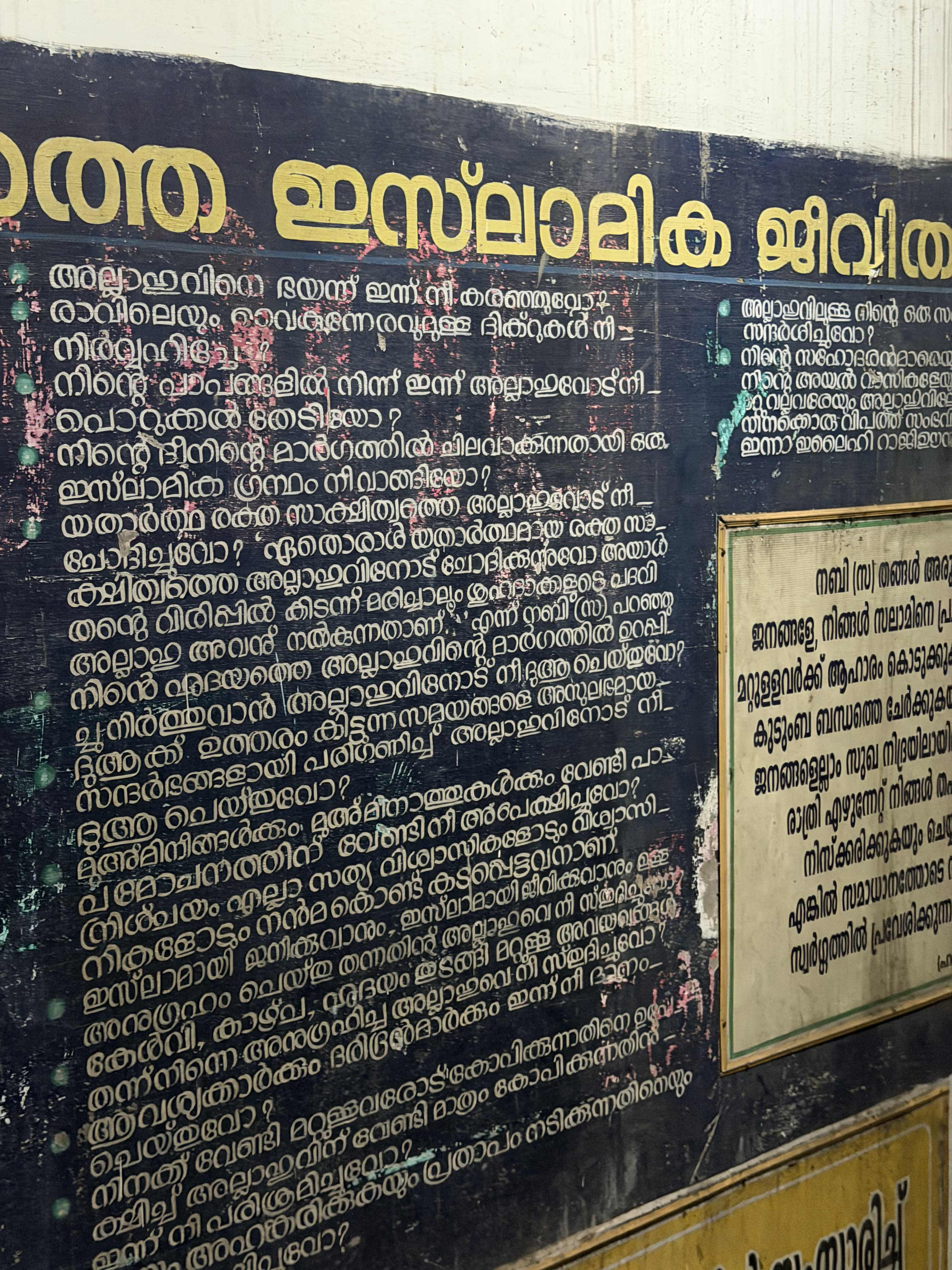
Wall Art (ചുമരെഴുത്ത്) at Edavannappara Mosque, showing early Malayalam lettering style.

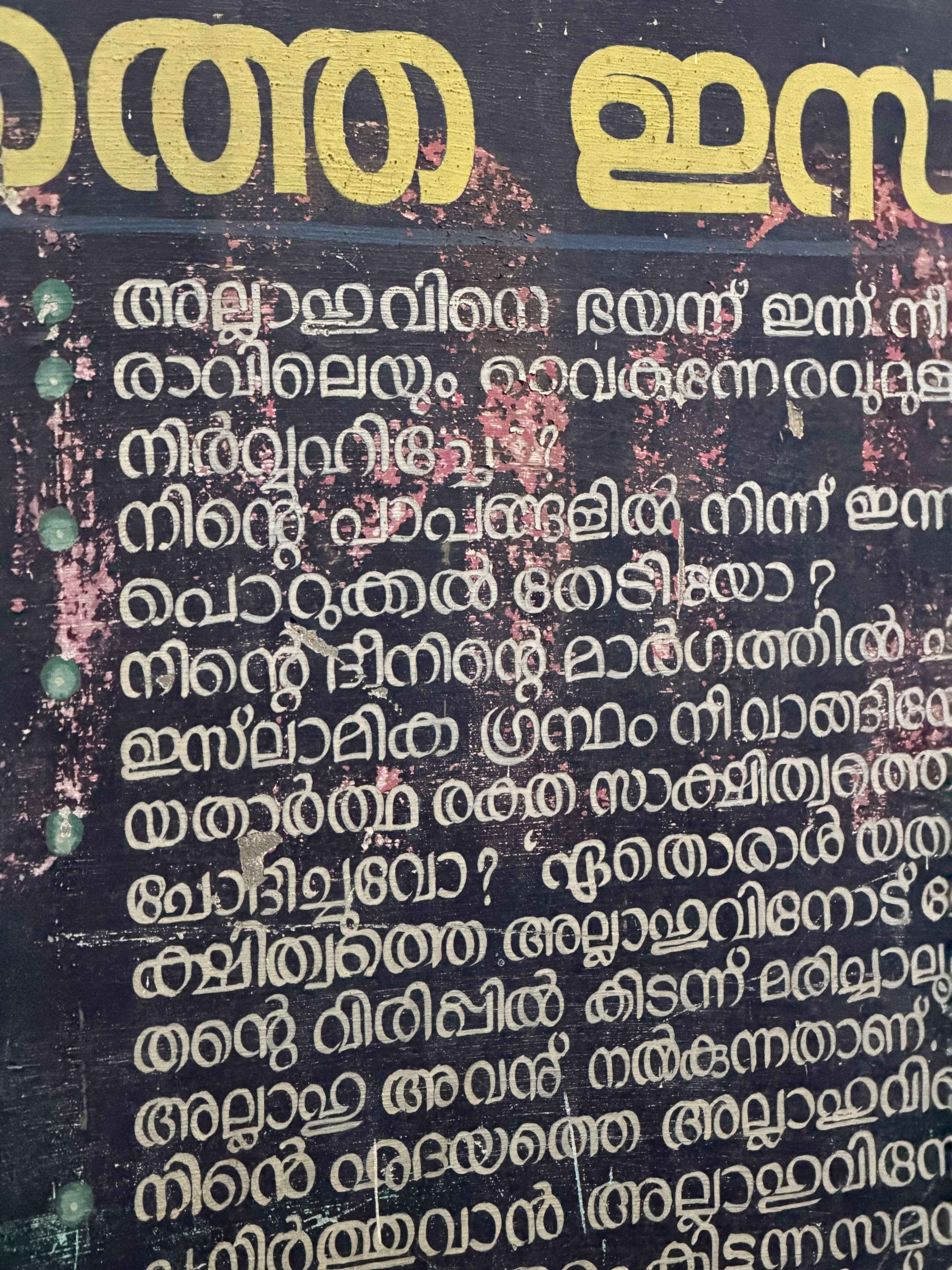
Close-up view of the Wall Art (ചുമരെഴുത്ത്), highlighting early lettering details.

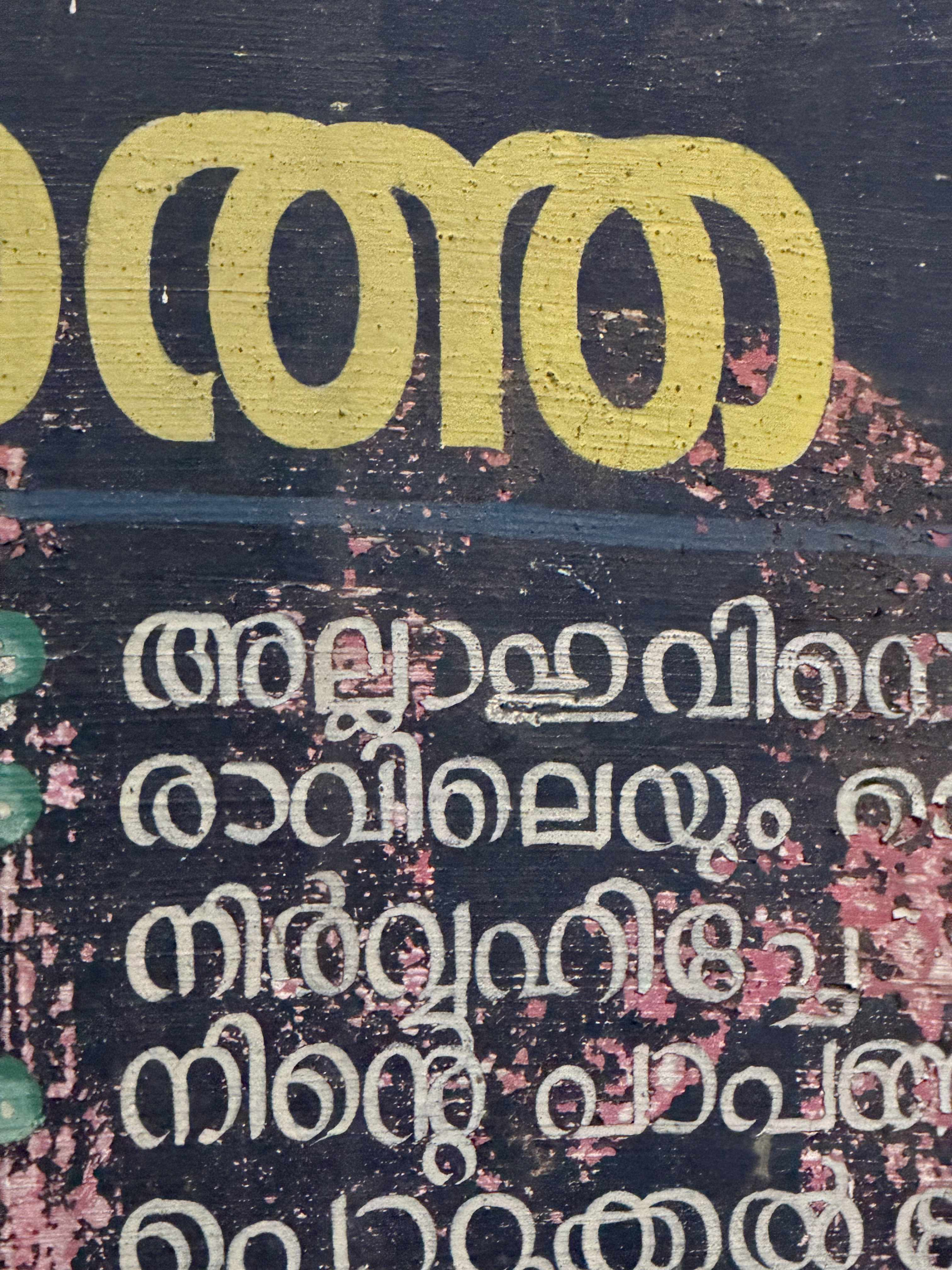
Detailed view of the lettering from the wall artwork created approximately 25 years ago; photograph taken on 26 March 2026.

== Career ==
=== Early career ===
Kareem briefly worked in Saudi Arabia, spending several years in the city of Madinah as a calligrapher. The calligraphy and architectural patterns of the Prophet's Mosque influenced his understanding of proportion and classical design.

He later moved to the United Arab Emirates and worked as a graphic designer. In 2011, he relocated to Qatar to join the advertising agency Leo Burnett in Doha and Dubai. His experience in branding helped him merge traditional calligraphy with contemporary visual design.

In 2022, he left his full-time job to pursue calligraphy and calligraffiti full-time.

=== Major projects and recognition ===
==== FIFA World Cup Qatar 2022 ====
Kareemgraphy was selected as one of the artists for the FIFA World Cup Qatar 2022. His contributions included:

- Eleven murals across Doha
- A desert mural representing the Iran–Wales match
- A mural near Lusail Stadium during the Argentina–Netherlands match
- The calligraphic title design for the official World Cup song “Ezz Al Arab”

He performed live calligraphy for seventeen days at fan zones, stadiums, and public areas.

==== Dubai World Cup 2024 – AC Milan & Emirates ====
In 2024, he created a large-scale installation at the Dubai World Cup horse racing event. The artwork featured a horse composed of 187 AC Milan jerseys arranged on an 8×8 metre display. The installation was widely photographed and praised by both AC Milan and Emirates officials.

==== Amir Sword International Equestrian Festival 2024 ====
At the Amir Sword International Equestrian Festival in 2024, he performed live calligraphy on a Bentley in collaboration with Al Shaqab and Bentley Motors. A video of the performance went viral and gained more than 30 million views.

== Themes and influences ==
Kareemgraphy's influences include traditional Arabic calligraphy, graffiti culture, Sufi aesthetics, Malayalam script, and social issues. His work often focuses on the idea of art as a bridge between communities and generations.

== Kareemgraphy Studio ==
Kareemgraphy Studio is where the work happens. Reed pens, ink and long tables on one side; framed originals on the other. It is the place Kareem writes when a piece needs weeks instead of minutes, and the place he teaches when a group needs a quiet room instead of a wall.

Visitors can see the originals up close, sit down with a qalam in a small workshop, or book the room for a private session. Evenings with poets and musicians happen here too, with one canvas taking it all down in ink.

The studio is open on workshop and event days, and by appointment for collectors, brands and anyone who wants to see the work in person.

== Media coverage ==
His work has appeared in:

- Khaleej Times
- Gulf Times
- The Peninsula Qatar
- Al Jazeera
- Al Ahram Egypt
- Deccan Herald
- MediaOne TV
- TwoCircles.net

== Personal life ==
Kareemgraphy lives in Doha with his family. He has credited his parents, teachers, and the communities he has lived in—Kerala, Madinah, Dubai, and Doha—for shaping his artistic journey.
