= Siyah mashq =

Calligraphic practice sheets

Siyah Mashq
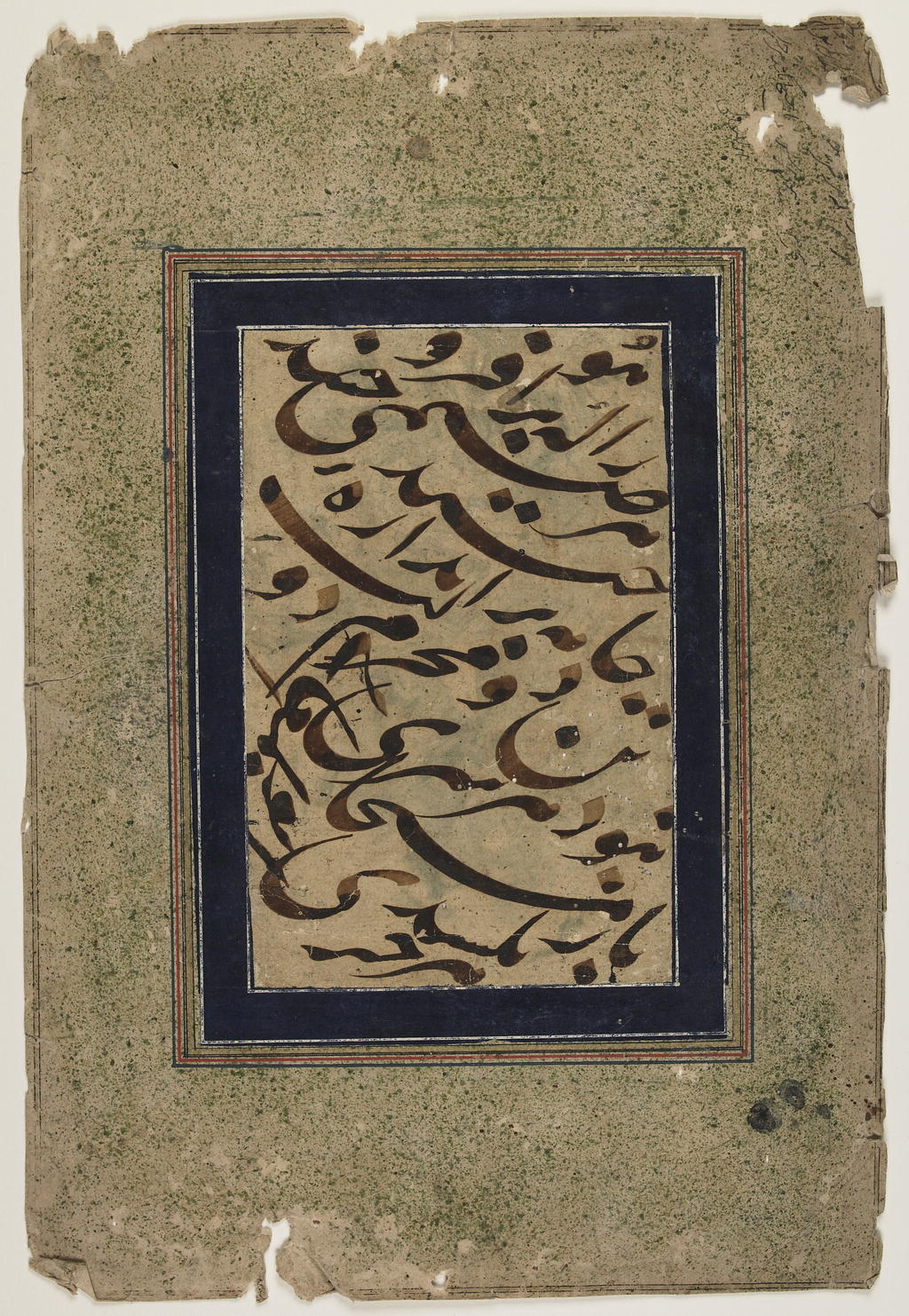
- This calligraphic fragment, created in the 16th or 17th century, recalls a number of Safavid exercises.
- Year: c. 1600
- Medium: Calligraphic practice sheets

Siyah mashq (Persian: سیاه مشق), lit. "black practice," are calligraphic practice sheets often covered completely with writing. They may include a number of diagonal words and letters used in combinations facing upwards and downwards on the folio. Siyah mashq was originally just a practice for the calligrapher to warm up his hand and to refine the shape of letters by repeating them over and over. These practices resulted in a page filled with words and letters. When calligraphers realised how stunning some of these pieces were, it was turned into a style of its own. Words and letters are repeated regardless of meaning, all for the sake of composition and style.

As an established genre, siyah mashq practice sheets abide by certain rules of formal compositions, largely guided by rhythm and repetition. Although siyah mashq sheets survive from ca. 1600, they seem to have been a particularly popular genre during the second half of the 19th century, i.e., during the artistic revival spearheaded by the Qajar ruler Nasir al-Din Shah, who reigned from 1848 to 1896.
