= List of Morbid Angel members =

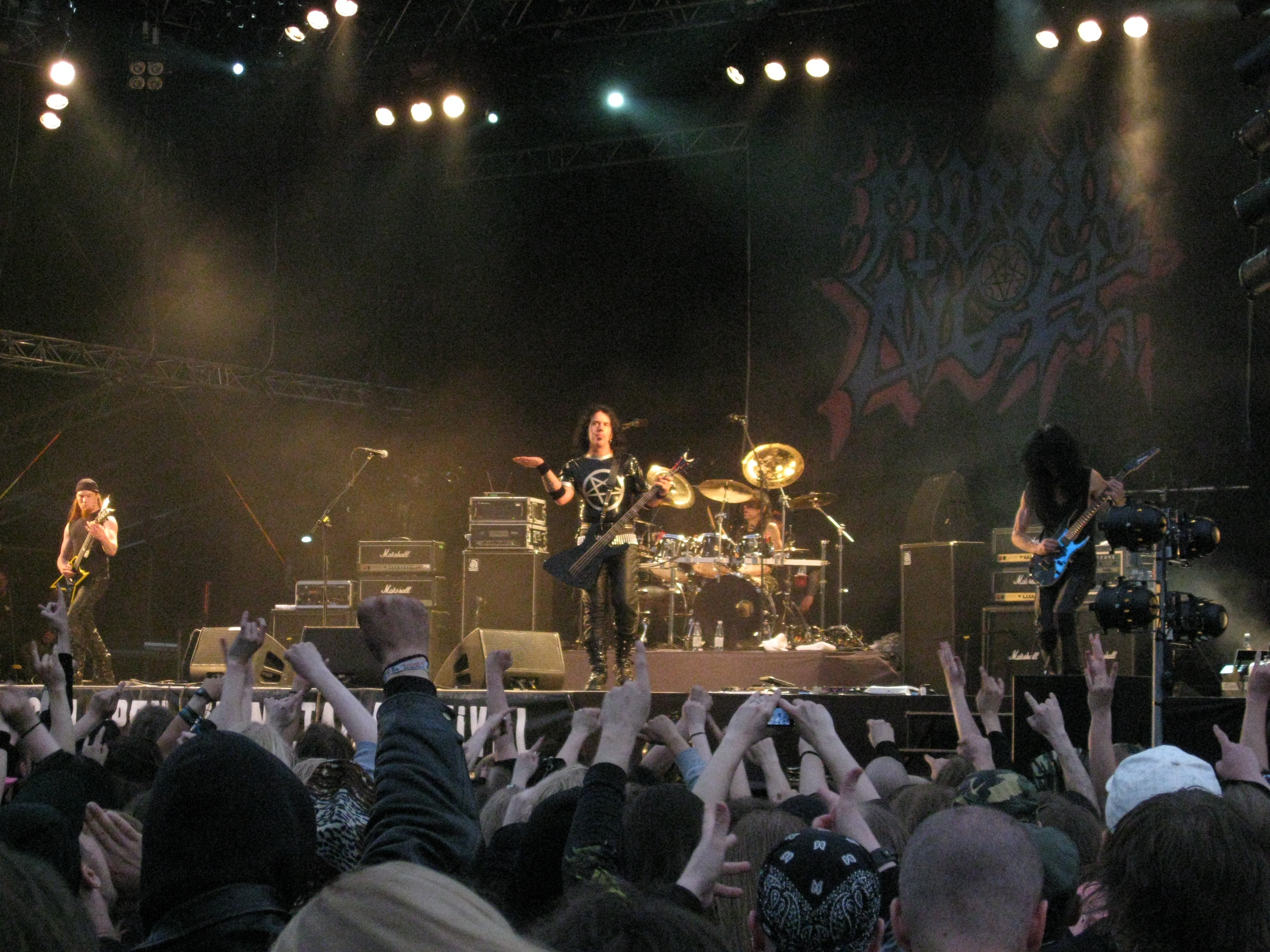
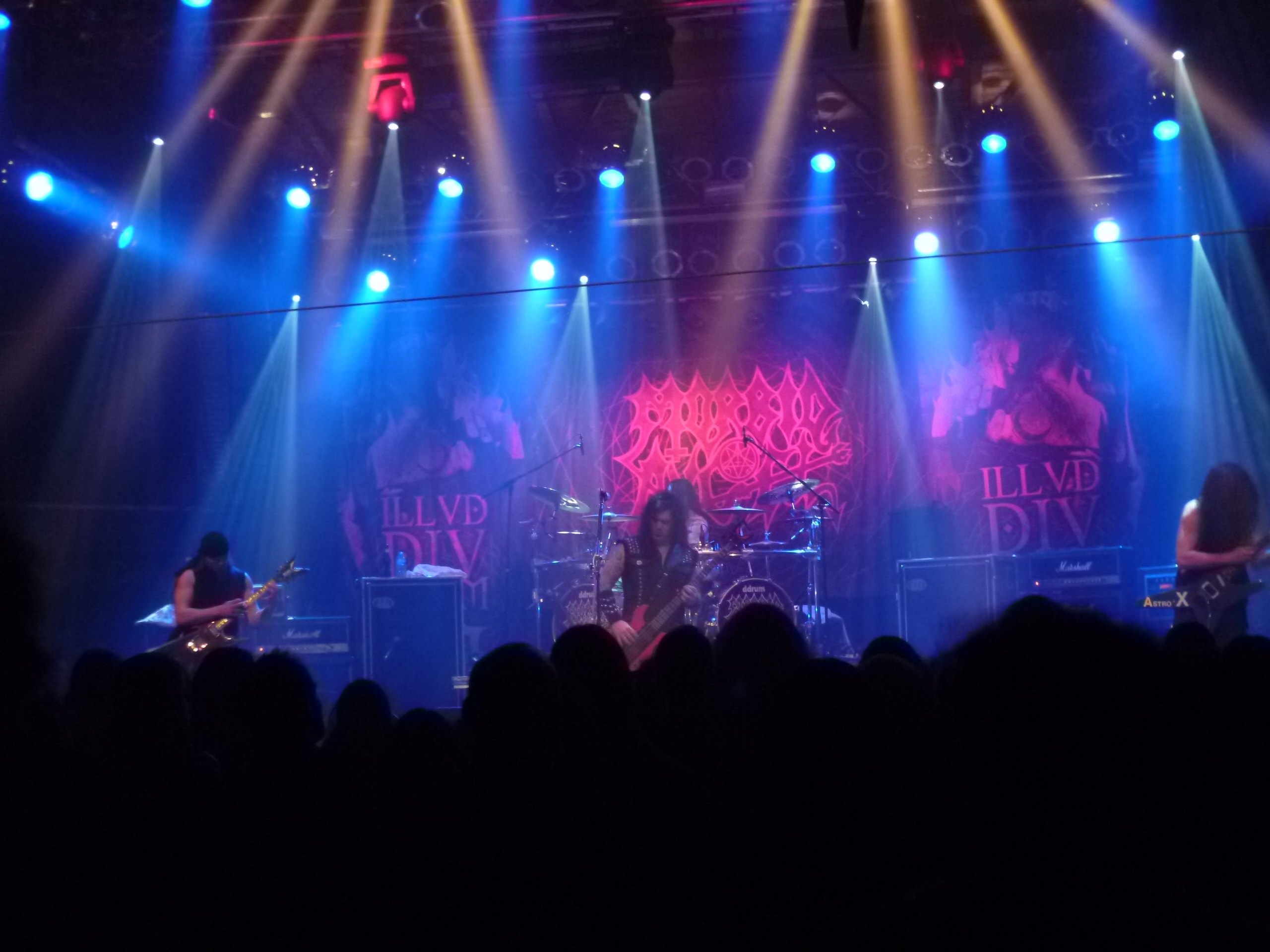
Morbid Angel performing live in 2008 (top) and 2011 (bottom).

Morbid Angel is an American death metal band from Tampa, Florida. Formed in 1983, the group was originally a trio featuring bassist and vocalist Dallas Ward, guitarist and keyboardist Trey Azagthoth, and drummer and vocalist Mike Browning. The band's current lineup includes constant member Azagthoth alongside bassist/vocalist Steve Tucker (1997-2001, 2003-2004, and most recently since 2015) and guitarist Dan Vadim Von (since 2017). Drums on the most recent 2023 tour were handled by session drummer Charlie Koryn.

== History ==
=== 1983–1998 ===
Morbid Angel was formed in 1983 by Dallas Ward, Trey Azagthoth and Mike Browning, with vocals initially handled by Ward. After brief stints in 1984 and 1985 with Terri Samuels and Kenny Bamber, respectively, vocal duties were taken over by Browning and guitarist Richard Brunelle, the latter of whom joined in 1985. By early 1986, the band consisted of Browning, Azagthoth, Brunelle and bassist John Ortega, who recorded the group's first three demos Scream Forth Blasphemies, Bleed for the Devil and Total Hideous Death, as well as the 1991 release Abominations of Desolation (which was recorded in 1986).

Shortly after the recording of Abominations of Desolation, Ortega was replaced with Sterling Von Scarborough, and after one more show Browning was fired following a fight with Azagthoth. He was replaced by drummer Wayne Hartsell and vocalist Michael Manson, although after a short time both Scarborough and Manson departed, leaving producer David Vincent to take over as bassist and vocalist. After another demo, Thy Kingdom Come, former Terrorizer drummer Pete Sandoval replaced Hartsell in July 1988. This lineup released Altars of Madness and Blessed Are the Sick.

In late 1992, Brunelle was dismissed from Morbid Angel, reportedly due to substance abuse, and the band became a trio for the first time since its formation. After the release of Covenant, however, Brunelle's vacated position was taken by former Ripping Corpse guitarist Erik Rutan. The new lineup issued Domination in 1995, before frontman David Vincent left at the end of the album's touring cycle the following summer. Rutan also left around the same time. Vincent was replaced by Steve Tucker and the band recorded 1998's Formulas Fatal to the Flesh as a trio.

=== 1998–2015 ===
With Erik Rutan back in the lineup, the group issued Gateways to Annihilation in 2000. The following year, Tucker was forced to step down due to "family and personal problems". He was replaced by Rutan's Hate Eternal bandmate Jared Anderson. By the summer of 2002, however, both Anderson and Rutan had left Morbid Angel to focus on Hate Eternal. After a short hiatus, it was announced in May 2003 that Morbid Angel had begun recording a new album as a trio, with Tucker returning. After the release of Heretic, the band added Monstrosity's Tony Norman as a touring guitarist.

By August 2004, Tucker had left for a second time due to various "personal reasons, musical reasons and very logical reasons" (including health problems), with former frontman David Vincent returning to take his place. Erik Rutan also returned temporarily in the summer of 2006, taking the place of Tony Norman for a European tour running until August. After the tour, the band remained relatively inactive until May 2008, when it was announced that Thor "Destructhor" Myhren of Zyklon had joined as an official second guitarist, in time for the recording of a planned eighth album.

In March 2010, drummer Pete Sandoval was forced to step down from Morbid Angel after undergoing back surgery. He was replaced by Tim Yeung, who was initially credited as a stand-in but ultimately remained with the band on a permanent basis. The new lineup issued Illud Divinum Insanus in 2011. In June 2015, a series of personnel changes occurred – first, it was announced that Tucker had returned, although Vincent initially claimed that he had not left; next, Yeung confirmed rumors that he too had left; and finally, Destructhor announced his departure a few days later.

=== Since 2015 ===
Morbid Angel remained inactive for the rest of 2015 and all of 2016, before announcing its return in January 2017 with new guitarist Dan Vadim Von and drummer Scott Fuller. The new lineup released Kingdoms Disdained later that year. It was announced in March 2023 that drummer Charlie Koryn joined the band for its 2023 spring American tour. His first gig with the band was in Pensacola, Florida at Vinyl Music Hall. However he is not an official member.

== Members ==
=== Current ===
| Image | Name | Years active | Instruments | Release contributions |
|---|---|---|---|---|
| | Trey Azagthoth | 1983–present | guitars; keyboards; occasional vocals | all releases |
| | Steve Tucker | 1997–2001; 2003–2004; 2015–present | bass; vocals | Formulas Fatal to the Flesh (1998); Gateways to Annihilation (2000); Heretic (2003); Kingdoms Disdained (2017) |
| | Dan Vadim Von | 2017–present | guitars | Kingdoms Disdained (2017) |
| | Charlie Koryn | 2023–present (touring) | drums | none to date |

=== Former ===
| Image | Name | Years active | Instruments | Release contributions |
|---|---|---|---|---|
| | Mike Browning | 1983–1986 (died 2026) | drums; vocals | Scream Forth Blasphemies (1986); Bleed for the Devil (1986); Total Hideous Death (1986); Abominations of Desolation (1991) |
| | Dallas Ward | 1983–1985 | bass; vocals | none |
| | Richard Brunelle | 1985–1992 (died 2019) | guitars | all releases from Scream Forth Blasphemies (1986) to Abominations of Desolation (1991); Live Madness '89 (2006) |
| | John Ortega | 1985–1986 | bass | Scream Forth Blasphemies (1986); Bleed for the Devil (1986); Total Hideous Death (1986); Abominations of Desolation (1991) |
| | Kenny Bamber | 1985–1986 | vocals | none |
| | Sterling Von Scarborough | 1986 (died 2006) | bass | none |
| | Wayne Hartsell | 1986–1988 | drums | Thy Kingdom Come (1987) |
| | Michael Manson | 1986 | vocals | none |
| | David Vincent | 1986–1996; 2004–2015 | bass; vocals; occasional keyboards | all releases from Thy Kingdom Come (1987) to Entangled in Chaos (1996), except Abominations of Desolation (1991); Live Madness '89 (2006); Illud Divinum Insanus (2011) |
| | Pete Sandoval | 1988–2010 | drums; occasional keyboards and piano | all releases from Altars of Madness (1989) to Live Madness '89, except Abominations of Desolation (1991) |
| | Erik Rutan | 1993–1996; 1998–2002; 2006 (touring) | guitars; keyboards | Domination (1995); Entangled in Chaos (1996); Gateways to Annihilation (2000) |
| | Jared Anderson | 2001–2002 (died 2006) | bass; vocals | none |
| | Tony Norman | 2003–2006 (touring only) | guitars | none |
| | Thor "Destructhor" Myhren | 2008–2015 | guitars | Illud Divinum Insanus (2011) |
| | Tim Yeung | 2010–2015 | drums | Illud Divinum Insanus (2011) |
| | Scott Fuller | 2017–2023 | drums | Kingdoms Disdained (2017) |

== Lineups ==
| Period | Members | Releases |
|---|---|---|
| 1983–1984 | Trey Azagthoth – guitars, keyboards; Mike Browning – drums; Dallas Ward – bass, vocals | none |
| 1984–1985 | Trey Azagthoth – guitars, keyboards; Mike Browning – drums; Dallas Ward – bass; Terri Samuels – vocals | none |
| 1985–1986 | Trey Azagthoth – guitars, keyboards; Mike Browning – drums; Richard Brunelle – guitars, vocals; John Ortega – bass; Kenny Bamber – vocals | none |
| Early – summer 1986 | Trey Azagthoth – guitars, keyboards; Mike Browning – drums, vocals; Richard Brunelle – guitars; John Ortega – bass | Scream Forth Blasphemies (1986); Bleed for the Devil (1986); Total Hideous Death (1986); Abominations of Desolation (1991) |
| Summer 1986 | Trey Azagthoth – guitars, keyboards; Mike Browning – drums, vocals; Richard Brunelle – guitars; Sterling Von Scarborough – bass | none |
| Fall 1986 | Trey Azagthoth – guitars, keyboards; Richard Brunelle – guitars; Sterling Von Scarborough – bass; Wayne Hartsell – drums; Michael Manson – vocals | none |
| Late 1986 – July 1988 | Trey Azagthoth – guitars, keyboards; Richard Brunelle – guitars; Wayne Hartsell – drums; David Vincent – bass, vocals | Thy Kingdom Come (1987) |
| July 1988 – late 1992 | Trey Azagthoth – guitars, keyboards; Richard Brunelle – guitars; David Vincent – bass, vocals; Pete Sandoval – drums | Altars of Madness (1989); Blessed Are the Sick (1991); Live Madness '89 (2006) |
| Late 1992 – late 1993 | Trey Azagthoth – guitars, keyboards; David Vincent – bass, vocals; Pete Sandoval – drums | Covenant (1993); Laibach Remixes (1994) |
| Late 1993 – summer 1996 | Trey Azagthoth – guitars, keyboards; David Vincent – bass, vocals; Pete Sandoval – drums; Erik Rutan – guitars, keyboards | Domination (1995); Entangled in Chaos (1996) |
| Early 1997 – early 1998 | Trey Azagthoth – guitars, keyboards; Pete Sandoval – drums; Steve Tucker – bass, vocals | Formulas Fatal to the Flesh (1998) |
| Early 1998 – April 2001 | Trey Azagthoth – guitars, keyboards; Pete Sandoval – drums; Steve Tucker – bass, vocals; Erik Rutan – guitars, keyboards (1st return) | Gateways to Annihilation (2000) |
| April 2001 – June 2002 | Trey Azagthoth – guitars, keyboards; Pete Sandoval – drums; Erik Rutan – guitars, keyboards; Jared Anderson – bass, vocals | none |
| June – August 2002 | Trey Azagthoth – guitars, keyboards; Pete Sandoval – drums; Erik Rutan – guitars, keyboards | none |
| August 2002 – May 2003 | Trey Azagthoth – guitars, keyboards; Pete Sandoval – drums | none |
| May – November 2003 | Trey Azagthoth – guitars, keyboards; Pete Sandoval – drums; Steve Tucker – bass, vocals (1st return) | Heretic (2003) |
| November 2003 – August 2004 | Trey Azagthoth – guitars, keyboards; Pete Sandoval – drums; Steve Tucker – bass, vocals; Tony Norman – guitars (touring only) | none |
| August 2004 – June 2006 | Trey Azagthoth – guitars, keyboards; Pete Sandoval – drums; Tony Norman – guitars (touring only); David Vincent – bass, vocals (1st return) | none |
| June – August 2006 | Trey Azagthoth – guitars, keyboards; Pete Sandoval – drums; David Vincent – bass, vocals; Erik Rutan – guitars (touring only) | none |
| August 2006 – May 2008 | Trey Azagthoth – guitars, keyboards; Pete Sandoval – drums; David Vincent – bass, vocals | none |
| May 2008 – March 2010 | Trey Azagthoth – guitars, keyboards; Pete Sandoval – drums; David Vincent – bass, vocals; Destructhor – guitars | none |
| March 2010 – June 2015 | Trey Azagthoth – guitars, keyboards; David Vincent – bass, vocals; Destructhor – guitars; Tim Yeung – drums | Illud Divinum Insanus (2011) |
| June 2015 – January 2017 | Trey Azagthoth – guitars, keyboards; Steve Tucker – bass, vocals (2nd return) | none |
| January 2017 – 2023 | Trey Azagthoth – guitars, keyboards; Steve Tucker – bass, vocals; Dan Vadim Von – guitars; Scott Fuller – drums | Kingdoms Disdained (2017) |
| 2023 – present | Trey Azagthoth – guitars, keyboards; Steve Tucker – bass, vocals; Dan Vadim Von – guitars; Charlie Koryn – drums (touring) | none |
