= I Am Morbid =

American death metal band

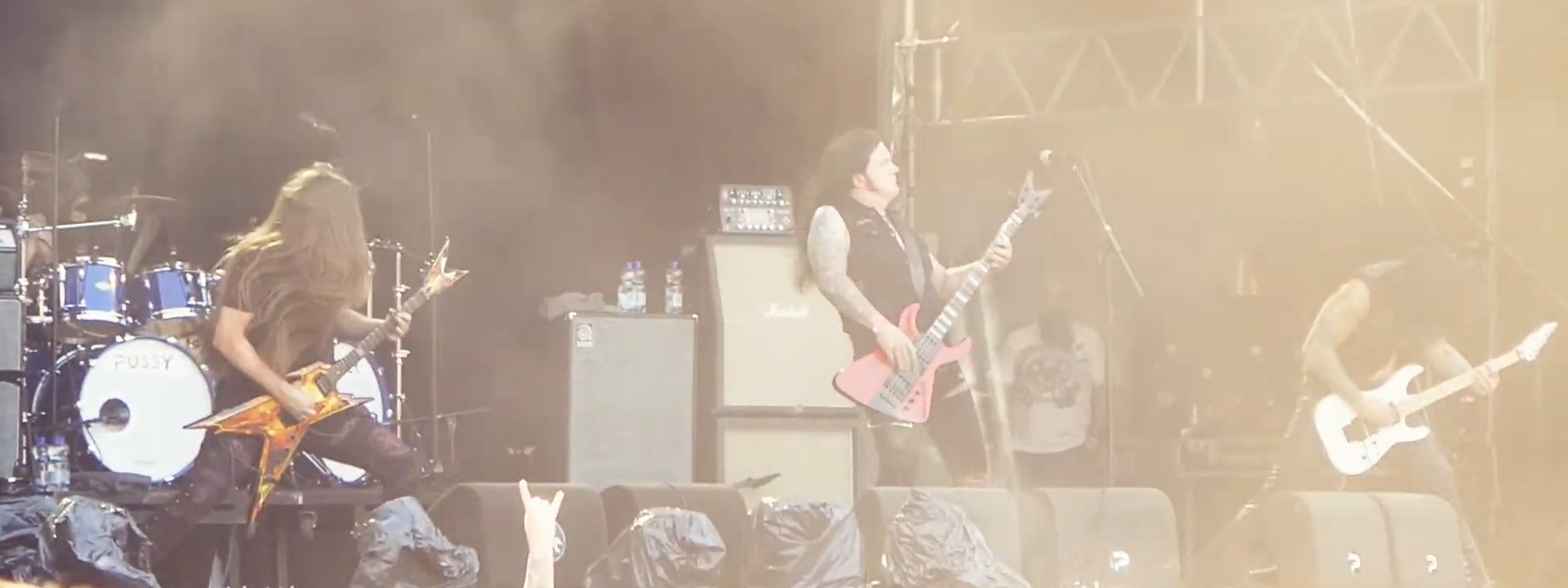
- I Am Morbid performing at Dynamo Metal Fest in 2018

Background information
- Genre: Death metal
- Years active: 2016–present
- Members: David Vincent; Bill Hudson; Richie Brown; Daniel Rutkowski
- Past members: Tim Yeung; Ira Black; Kelly McLaughlin; Pete Sandoval

I Am Morbid are an American death metal cover and tribute band formed in late 2016, by bassist/vocalist David Vincent and drummer Tim Yeung, both former members of Morbid Angel.

== History ==
In June 2015, both Vincent and Yeung parted ways with Morbid Angel, alongside guitarist Thor "Destructhor" Myhren. The two subsequently formed I Am Morbid, named after a song from Illud Divinum Insanus (2011). The band was announced in December 2016, and originally featured guitarists Bill Hudson and Ira Black. Vincent said that the band would only play music from early albums specifically Altars of Madness (1989), Blessed Are the Sick (1991) Covenant (1993) and Domination (1995).

The band played their first show in Krasnodar, Russia on May 23, 2017, finishing at the Alcatraz Metal Festival 2017, replacing Morbid Angel who had cancelled their European tour dates. In 2021, Yeung and Black were replaced by Pete Sandoval (also ex-Morbid Angel) and Kelly McLauchlin. McLauchlin left in October 2022, he was replaced by Richie Brown.

The band are yet to release an album although Vincent has said that the band might begin recording.

On September 30, 2026, Sandoval announced he was leaving the band.

== Members ==
=== Current members ===
- David Vincent – bass, vocals (2016-present)
- Bill Hudson – guitars (2016-present)
- Richie Brown – guitars (2022-present)
- Daniel "Nar-Sil" Rutkowski – drums (2026-present)

=== Former members ===
- Tim Yeung – drums (2016-2021)
- Ira Black – guitars (2016-2021)
- Kelly McLauchlin – guitars (2021-2022)
- Pete "Commando" Sandoval – drums (2022-2026)
