= Kingdoms Disdained =

Studio album by Morbid Angel
- Released: December 1, 2017
- Recorded: 2017
- Studios: Mana Recording Studios, St. Petersburg
- Genre: Death metal
- Length: 47:43
- Label: Silver Lining
- Producer: Erik Rutan

Morbid Angel chronology
Illud Divinum Insanus (2011)	Kingdoms Disdained (2017)

Kingdoms Disdained is the ninth studio album by American death metal band Morbid Angel, released on December 1, 2017, by Silver Lining Music. It is the first album since 2003's Heretic to feature Steve Tucker and the only one to feature former Abysmal Dawn drummer Scott Fuller. It is also the first to not feature David Vincent, Destructhor and Tim Yeung since 2011's Illud Divinum Insanus, as all three members left the band in 2015. A music video was made for "Garden of Disdain".

== Background ==
On August 3, 2016, Morbid Angel signed to UDR Music and began work on a new studio album, which would be released in 2017, and a tour to take place that year. They later signed to Silver Lining Music as a result. In March 2017, Tucker said the album would be a "death metal album". On the opening night of the band's early summer U.S. tour, the song originally titled "Warped", later named "Paradigms Warped", was performed for the first time. The cover artwork was unveiled on October 5, along with two tracks following thereafter.

== Album information ==
The album's title refers to the current aural document of a world sinking into uncharted despair, as explained by Tucker. He also says that the artwork "is a fair image of the world today, but taken from a different perspective; the perspective of those Gods who built this, who may be resting now but are starting to wake up." In addition to Tucker's take on the album's title, Trey Azagthoth told Revolver that it references the 1980s animated cartoon Thundarr the Barbarian.

When talking about the album, Tucker says that it has "a big, grandiose vibe that sort of becomes a little larger than life. That's really what I like most about the album myself. I think what stands out about it, is that even though it's really raw and nasty, it's kind of timely as well. I think it fits into what is going on in the world today."

Morbid Angel spent three weeks in preproduction rehearsing for Kingdoms Disdained in studio before taking almost a month recording the album. Morbid Angel was joined by their former Domination era Guitarist Erik Rutan, (Ripping Corpse, Hate Eternal, Alas, & Cannibal Corpse) to co-produce the album at his studio Mana Recording in St. Petersburg, Florida alongside Azagthoth.

== Recording and writing ==
When talking about the making of the album, Tucker explains, "The first thing Trey said to me was, 'I want to make killer music with killer people.' To go into any more detail than that, honestly, I don't even remember, but it was really just about, 'Hey, man, I want this to be MORBID ANGEL. I don't want this to be what it was being changed to be.' I told Trey my first question was always musical direction. Any time it involves playing music, that's got to be the first question. Everything Trey said to me and all the discussions we had made me very comfortable that Trey had every intention on doing the kind of album that MORBID ANGEL fans expect and that I, personally, feel. To do anything else, I don't feel it, and, to be honest with you, it's not going to be great by any means if I'm trying to do something that, to me, is fake. I think the thing is the same about Trey. Trey's a very focused and singular-focused person when it comes to music. I think he knew exactly what he wanted. He knew that I was the right guy to give him what he wanted out of this album." Tucker, Azagthoth and Fuller contributed to the songwriting, and the inspiration for the lyrics comes from "social events that are occurring through time, repeatedly" and "from always a third-person perspective. They're definitely always from the eyes of someone who is neutral. They are an observation more than anything."

Trey stated in an interview, "Bro, I didn’t have much of a clue as to what to do for solos so I just got in there and jammed to it and recorded things...I was just exploring the place and tapping into the magic of the moment. Magic and philosophy is the code, just like the code for computer software. But humans are better than any computer, really. We can all create an embed into ourselves—the kind of code that we deem useful to achieve whatever results we want to achieve."

== Critical reception ==
=== Album reviews ===
Professional ratings
Review scores
Source	Rating
Blabbermouth	9.5/10
Cryptic Rock	5/5 stars
Decibel	7/10
Distorted Sound	8/10
Exclaim!	8/10
Metal Hammer	4.5/5 stars
Metal Storm	6/10
Sputnikmusic	2.5/5 stars
ToiletOvHell	4.5/5 stars
Pitchfork	7.3/10

Kingdoms Disdained received generally positive reception, with critics praising the album as a return to form after the band's controversial past affair Illud Divinum Insanus. Critics have noted that it represents a pivot away from the industrial-influenced style of their previous album, and a return to the more traditional death metal approach of Formulas Fatal to the Flesh and Heretic. Exclaim! praised returning vocalist/bassist Steve Tucker's performance on the album, and cited guitarist Trey Azagthoth's performance as "the main highlight of the album, as they showcase all of the familiar crushing heaviness and forward-thinking technical intricacies that make him an impeccable songwriter." Pitchfork said that the album "sets the band back on course", arguing that it benefits from the return of a much more traditional death metal sound. Metal Hammer described the album as "streamlined, grandiose and utterly complete", singling out Azagthoth for particular praise, arguing that "no one wields the demonic spirit of death metal with anywhere near the same sense of power and mastery." Morgan Y. Evans for Metalriot.com wrote: "While the cover art made me scared they were going to go in some modern technical death direction, the record is very old school. “Paradigms Warped” has the sort of brutal heft that lifts you out of your skin which I crave from Morbid Angel, whether they are blasting you with speed or crushing you to dust."

Sputnikmusic criticized Kingdoms Disdained for dragging in the second half as "too many tracks drag the album down and too few highlights to pick it up." They argued that the "problem songs all tend to be the longest and most repetitive, full of forays into slow, chuggy passages (suspiciously deathcore like at times even) and often lacking Azagthoth’s legendary solos. Conversely the best songs (see the opening handful and a few highlights in the back half like “For No Master”) are usually sharp, concise, and high tempo riff fests", while also suggesting that the album lacked the distinctive personality of the band's previous records. Decibel wrote that "beneath the horns is a no-compromise sound that works hard to reinvent the halcyon moments on Formulas Fatal to the Flesh and Heretic", though they criticized the album for a lack of diversity amongst the songs, concluding that "minds won't be blown, but merely sated."

=== Accolades ===
Award	Publication	Ranking	Source
20 Best Albums of 2017	Revolver	14	
20 Best Metal Albums of 2017	Rolling Stone	9	
The Best Metal Albums of 2017	The Quietus	19	

== Track listing ==
All lyrics are written by Steve Tucker; all music is composed by Trey Azagthoth, except where noted.

No.	Title	Music	Length
1.	"Piles of Little Arms"		3:44
2.	"D.E.A.D. [Department of Eradication and Disposal]"		3:01
3.	"Garden of Disdain"		4:25
4.	"The Righteous Voice"	Tucker, Scott Fuller	5:03
5.	"Architect and Iconoclast"		5:44
6.	"Paradigms Warped"		3:59
7.	"The Pillars Crumbling"		5:06
8.	"For No Master"	Tucker, Fuller	3:29
9.	"Declaring New Law (Secret Hell)"		4:21
10.	"From the Hand of Kings"	Tucker, Fuller	4:02
11.	"The Fall of Idols"		4:49
Total length:			47:43

A 2-CD release contains an EP titled Complete Acid Terror, featuring instrumental demos. Also contained on the limited edition 6 7" vinyl boxed set and released on standard format

No.	Title	Length
1.	"Piles of Little Arms" (Demo, Instrumental)	3:47
2.	"Battlebots" (D.E.A.D. (Department of Eradication and Disposal) Demo, Instrumental)	3:01
3.	"Sludge Creeper" (Garden of Disdain Demo, Instrumental)	4:26
4.	"Acid Crusher" (Architect and Iconoclast Demo, Instrumental)	5:44
5.	"7 String Swing" (The Pillars Crumbling Demo, Instrumental)	5:06
6.	"Warped" (Paradigms Warped Demo, Instrumental)	3:57
7.	"Secret Hell" (Declaring New Law (Secret Hell) Demo, Instrumental)	4:18
Total length:		30:19

== Personnel ==
Morbid Angel

- Steve Tucker – bass, vocals
- Trey Azagthoth – guitars, backing vocals on "For No Master"
- Scott Fuller – drums

Additional musician

- Dan Vadim Von – lead guitar on "Declaring New Law (Secret Hell)"

Production

- Morbid Angel – production
- Erik Rutan – production, engineering, mixing
- Trey Azagthoth – songwriting (tracks 1–3, 5–7, 9, 11)
- Steve Tucker – lyrics, songwriting (tracks 4, 8, 10)
- Alan Douches – mastering
- Ken Coleman – artwork
- Charlene Tupper – photography

== Charts ==
Chart (2017)	Peak position
Belgian Albums (Ultratop Flanders)	111
Belgian Albums (Ultratop Wallonia)	159
Finnish Albums (Suomen virallinen lista)	31
German Albums (Offizielle Top 100)	93
