= Promulgation of the Fall =

Studio album by Dead Congregation
- Released: May 5, 2014
- Studio: Studio Feedback in Pagrati, Athens, Greece.
- Genre: Death metal
- Length: 40:02
- Label: Martyrdoom Productions; Profound Lore Records; Norma Evangelium Diaboli
- Producer: Charis Zourelidis; Anastasis Valtsanis

Dead Congregation chronology
Graves of the Archangels (2008)	Promulgation of the Fall (2014)

Promulgation of the Fall is the second full-length studio album by the Greek death metal band Dead Congregation. The album was released on May 5, 2014, on the band's own record label Martyrdoom Productions in Europe, and on Profound Lore Records in North America. Vinyl distribution was handled by Norma Evangelium Diaboli. The album received widespread acclaim from music critics and was featured on a number of end-of-year lists.

== Musical style, writing, composition ==
Many of the songs were written shortly after the completion of their previous album, 'Graves of the Archangels' in 2008, "then some were changed after playing them for such a long time and a couple were written at a later point." According to Anastasis Valtsanis,

"I write all the music and then I show the songs to the rest of the band, we rehearse them and sometimes we need to change a part or two, sometimes everything comes together effortlessly. T.K. writes most of the lyrics, which we arrange over the music once a song is completed. So in a way, we make sure that the songs work perfectly as instrumentals and then we add vocals wherever it feels appropriate. Vocals should contribute towards the overall atmosphere and shouldn’t be the focal point of a song. Same with lead guitars."

The album's central theme is the decline of Christianity, as well as death, decadence, decay, darkness, and despair. Valtsanis has also explained that "Most of the times the lyrics are (figuratively) trying to paint a surreal picture quite similarly to H. P. Lovecraft’s way of writing, though our lyrics do not deal with the Cthulhu Mythos or with fictional themes." Various critics have compared the band's sound to Incantation, Morbid Angel, and other death metal bands. Critics have also noted the combination of death metal and doom metal influences on the album.

== Recording, production ==
Valtsanis has said in an interview that:

"We wanted the drums to sound more aggressive this time, as for the guitars we used our own gear/amplifiers as always. But this studio was better at capturing our sound and the sound engineer was a lot more cooperative towards my instructions so the final result is much closer to what we wanted, compared to ‘graves…’. The guitars are a bit dirtier because we recorded 4 rhythm guitars without correcting mistakes so they’re not super tight but it was a compromise we were willing to make in order to get a heavier sound and more natural feel on the recording, instead of making everything perfect and fool people that we’re flawless musicians (because we are not)."

== Artwork ==
Unlike their previous album, the artwork for Promulgation of the Fall was not created by their friend Timo Ketola.

"We didn’t want to work with an artist that’s worked with too many bands in the scene so for this time we decided not to go with our friend T. Ketola, who’s been responsible for the artwork on our past releases. This time we chose a local friend of our drummer named Ayis Lertas. He approached us and asked if he can have a take on doing the artwork, we gave him some basic instructions, the album title, some lyrics and demo songs. So we did have a specific concept indeed, but as we didn’t want to emasculate him artistically, we told him to approach the concept as he saw fit. His first draft was so good that we didn’t need to look further; he completely captured what we were looking for, which was an abstract piece that reeks of decadence, pretty similar to old Slayer covers done by Larry Carroll. Then another local artist who’s a professional Byzantine Iconographer also wanted to contribute, so he did the titles in Byzantine fonts, hand-painted in the traditional way with vinegar and egg-based paint. Both artists also contributed some illustrations for the inner pages of the booklet. We’re really pleased with the overall result."

== Critical reception ==
Professional ratings
Review scores
Source	Rating
Exclaim!	(9/10)
Pitchfork	(7.9/10)
Sputnikmusic	(4.2/5)

The album received widespread acclaim from music critics. Metal Injection described the album as " everything good death metal should be. It's savage, extreme, and technically proficient, but, above all, this is a unsettling record." The Quietus wrote that the album continues in the spirit of Death's song 'Pull the Plug' and "its defiant acceptance of the end, something that would end organised religion as we know it if it got in the water supply." They added that "Promulgation Of The Fall operates in that spirit, embracing chaos with open arms and jettisoning millennia of human guilt in the process." Exclaim! noted the drums as a highlight of the album, as well as the song transitions and broader songwriting, describing it as "a rare death metal accomplishment." Pitchfork noted that, though the album's lack of innovation, the band "have concentrated on perfecting a very specific sound that invokes a very specific atmosphere, drawing from a very specific sonic template in order to achieve that vision." They concluded that "it’s clear that there is something special happening here. Most importantly, they leave us wanting more." Sputnikmusic wrote that "With tighter songwriting, better production, and a little extra helping of doom, Dead Congregation’s Promulgation of the Fall stands strong with their now classic Graves of the Archangels and delivers in just about every conceivable way."

=== Accolades ===
Publication	Accolade	Rank	Ref.
Decibel	Best Album of 2014	11	
Stereogum	50 Best Metal Albums of 2014	14	
Terrorizer	Top 50 Albums of 2014	20	
Pitchfork	The Best Metal Albums of 2014	10	
Sputnikmusic	Top 50 Albums of 2014	6	

== Track listing ==
All music is composed by Anastasis Valtsanis.

No.	Title	Length
1.	"Only Ashes Remain"	5:13
2.	"Promulgation of the Fall"	3:40
3.	"Serpentskin"	5:33
4.	"Quintessence Maligned"	4:14
5.	"Immaculate Poison"	5:08
6.	"Nigredo"	5:00
7.	"Schisma"	7:18
8.	"From a Wretched Womb"	3:56
Total length:		40:02

== Personnel ==
=== Dead Congregation ===
- Anastasis Valtsanis - vocals, guitar, songwriting, production, layout
- T.K. - guitar
- G.S. - bass
- V. V. - drums

=== Additional ===
- Charis Zourelidis - production, recording engineer
- Ayis Lertas - artwork
- Kostas Protopapas - additional artwork
- Timo Ketola - lyrics (track 6)
- Tim Grieco - lyrics (track 4)
