= Gateways to Annihilation =

2000 studio album by Morbid Angel

Studio album by Morbid Angel
- Released: October 17, 2000
- Studios: Morrisound Recording, Tampa, Florida
- Genre: Death metal
- Length: 44:25
- Label: Earache
- Producers: Morbid Angel; Jim Morris

Morbid Angel chronology
Formulas Fatal to the Flesh (1998)	Gateways to Annihilation (2000)	Heretic (2003)

Professional ratings
Review scores
Source	Rating
AllMusic	4/5 stars
Brave Words & Bloody Knuckles	9/10
Classic Rock	3/5 stars
Collector's Guide to Heavy Metal	7/10
The Encyclopedia of Popular Music	3/5 stars
Kerrang!	4/5 stars
Rock Hard	9.5/10
Terrorizer	7.5/10

Gateways to Annihilation is the sixth studio album by American death metal band Morbid Angel, released on October 17, 2000 by Earache Records. This album saw a change in musical style from the speed-laden intensity of the previous album, Formulas Fatal to the Flesh, to a slower, more droning style reminiscent of Blessed Are the Sick. This is the first album in which Steve Tucker contributed lyrics and music to the band. It is also the second and last album to feature guitarist and keyboardist Erik Rutan.

Dan Seagrave painted the album cover. This marks the first Morbid Angel album cover he painted since Altars of Madness.

The intro track's title, "Kawazu", is an archaic Japanese word meaning "frog", which explains the sounds of frogs croaking on the track.

== Track listing ==
All lyrics are written by Steve Tucker, except "Secured Limitations" by Trey Azagthoth.

No.	Title	Music	Length
1.	"Kawazu" (instrumental)	Azagthoth	0:36
2.	"Summoning Redemption"	Azagthoth	7:17
3.	"Ageless, Still I Am"	Azagthoth	5:18
4.	"He Who Sleeps"	Tucker	4:05
5.	"To the Victor the Spoils"	Azagthoth, Tucker	3:43
6.	"At One with Nothing"	Azagthoth, Tucker	4:34
7.	"Opening of the Gates"	Azagthoth	5:16
8.	"Secured Limitations"	Azagthoth	4:39
9.	"Awakening" (instrumental)	Erik Rutan	1:21
10.	"I"	Azagthoth, Tucker	3:50
11.	"God of the Forsaken"	Rutan	3:50
Total length:			44:28

== Personnel ==
- Steve Tucker – bass, lead vocals
- Trey Azagthoth – guitars, backing vocals, lead vocals on "Secured Limitations"
- Erik Rutan – guitars, keyboards
- Pete Sandoval – drums
