= Morbid Angel =

American death metal band

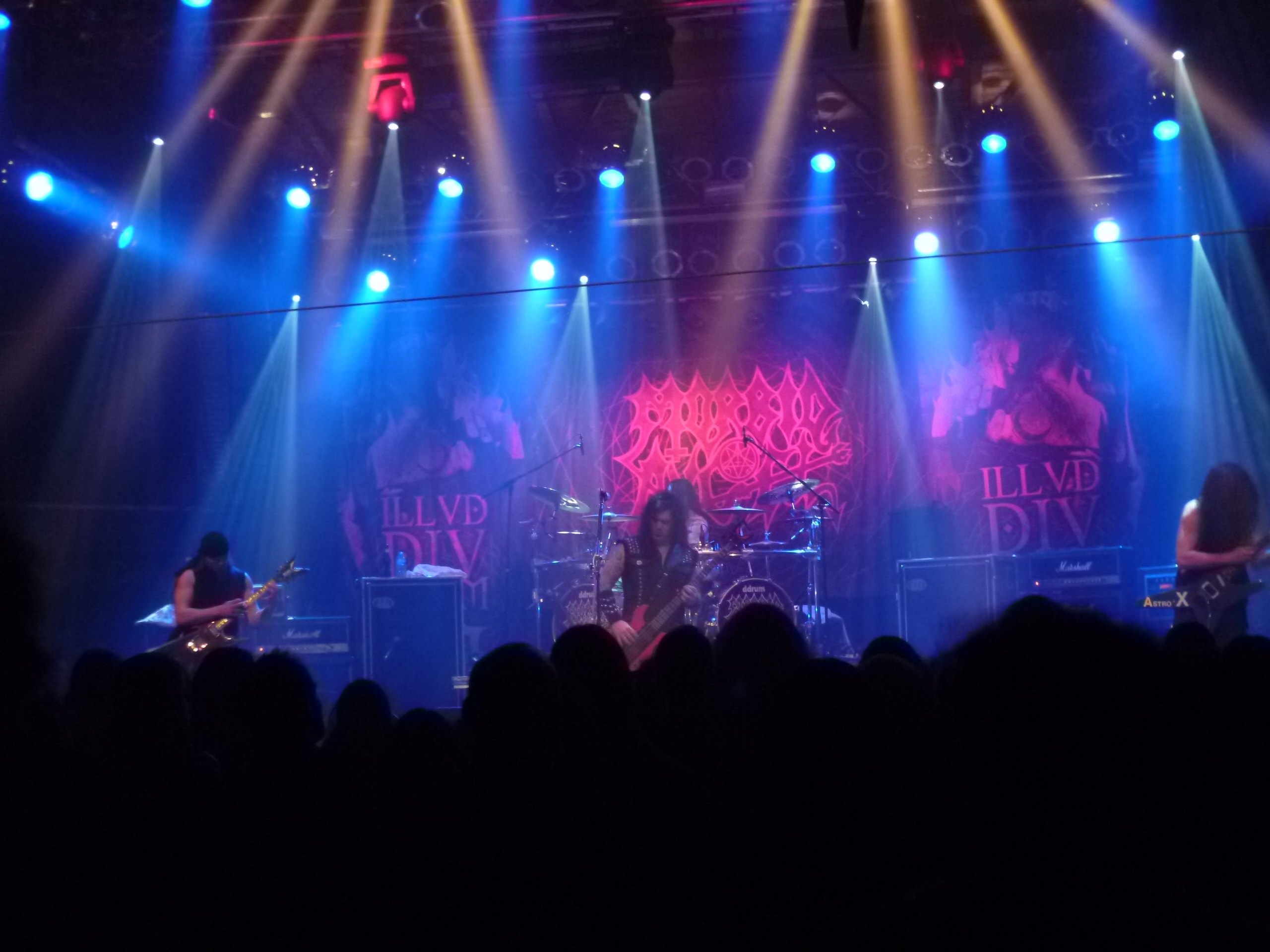
- Morbid Angel performing in 2011

Background information
- Also known as: Ice; Heretic
- Origin: Tampa, Florida, U.S.
- Genre: Death metal
- Years active: 1983–present
- Labels: Earache; Combat; Relativity; Giant; Season of Mist; New Renaissance; Silver Lining
- Members: Trey Azagthoth; Steve Tucker; Dan Vadim Von; Charlie Koryn
- Past members: David Vincent; Pete Sandoval; Thor Anders Myhren; Tim Yeung; Mike Browning; Scott Fuller; Wayne Hartsell; Dallas Ward; Richard Brunelle; Kenny Bamber; Sterling Von Scarborough; Erik Rutan; Jared Anderson; Tony Norman; John Ortega; Michael Manson
- Website: morbidangel.com

Morbid Angel is an American death metal band based in Tampa, Florida, formed in 1983 by guitarist, primary composer and sole remaining original member Trey Azagthoth, vocalist and bassist Dallas Ward, and drummer Mike Browning. It was one of the first bands to incorporate guttural vocals, up-tempo blast beats, multiple tempo changes and a dark atmosphere. Morbid Angel was also the first death metal band to experience mainstream success in connection with being signed to Giant Records in 1992, heavy rotation of its music videos on MTV, and having the music video for the song "God of Emptiness" shown on an episode of Beavis and Butt-Head. The band's first three albums – Altars of Madness (1989), Blessed Are the Sick (1991), and Covenant (1993) – are considered classics in the death metal genre.

British music magazine Terrorizer ranked Altars of Madness first in its list "Top 40 greatest death metal albums". Decibel magazine also rated guitarist Trey Azagthoth as the number one "death metal guitarist ever". The band's songs are complex in arrangement; this owes much to the considerable technical skills of both Azagthoth and drummer Pete Sandoval, the latter of whom also played in the grindcore band Terrorizer. According to Nielsen SoundScan, Morbid Angel's third album Covenant is the best-selling death metal album of the Soundscan era with over 150,000 units sold, and the band is the third-best-selling death metal act in the United States (after Cannibal Corpse and Deicide up until 2003 with sales of over 445,000). In 2016, the staff of Loudwire named them the 27th best metal band of all time.

The band's original lyrical themes, when helmed by Vincent (and Azagthoth and Browning respectively) focused mostly on Satanism, occultism and blasphemous subject matter, but from Formulas Fatal to the Flesh (1998) onward, via Azagthoth's influence, the lyrics moved toward the ancient Sumerian gods. Much of this is a nod to the Simon Necronomicon, which was influenced by Sumerian mythology, the author H. P. Lovecraft, and fascination with the Roman Empire, and during Steve Tucker's tenure they take on more anti-religious and barbaric themes, namely of the strong overcoming the weak.

== History ==
=== Formation, demos, and Altars of Madness (1983–1990) ===
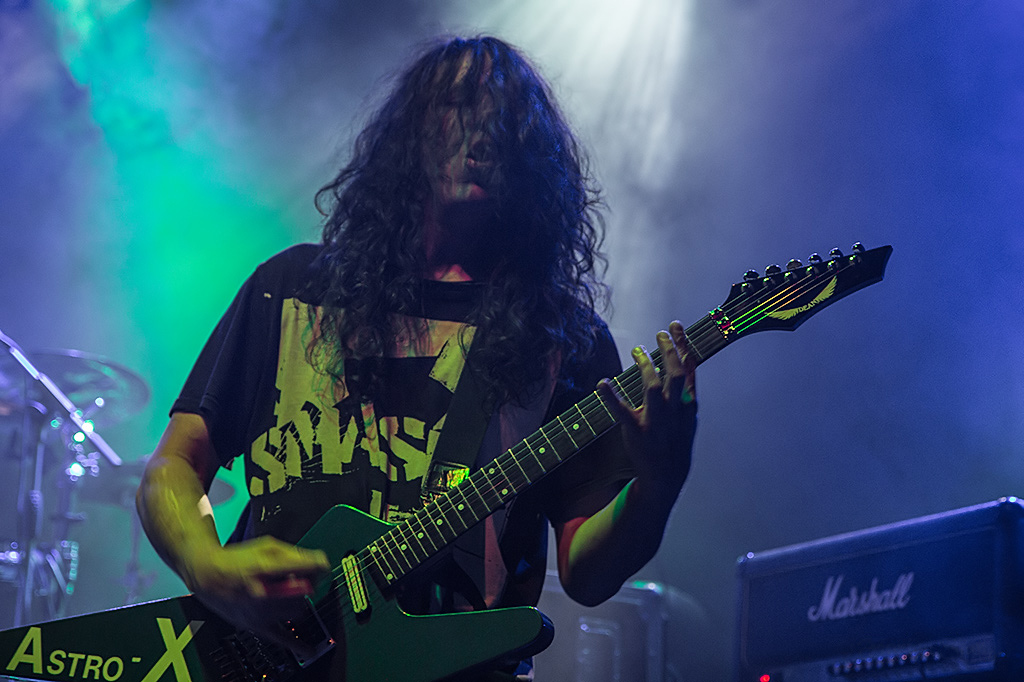
Trey Azagthoth (pictured in 2012) has been in the band since its formation.

The earliest formation of the band was named Ice and was formed in 1983 in Tampa, Florida, by guitarist Trey Azagthoth and drummer/vocalist Mike Browning. The band briefly became known as Heretic, in late 1983, until they became aware of another band with the same name from Los Angeles.

In the early stages of its career it developed a reputation for "gruesome stage antics". The band quickly became highly influential in the formation of the Florida death metal scene, inspiring other highly influential acts such as Obituary. Morbid Angel recorded its debut album, Abominations of Desolation, in 1986, but the band was unsatisfied with the final product and it remained unreleased until 1991, printing 10,000 copies. Azagthoth said in the latter year: "It wasn't up to standards, and I learned a lot from that. A debut album is gonna mark you for life. It was not good enough." In 1986, David Vincent joined the band, replacing Michael Manson and Sterling von Scarborough as vocalist and bassist respectively. Fellow Terrorizer member, drummer Pete Sandoval, soon followed.

The band's first proper studio album, Altars of Madness, was released in 1989, and is regarded by many as one of the most important death metal albums of all time. Music journalist Jason Birchmeier writes that:

Few albums struck a chord within the ears and minds of the late-'80s underground metal scene like Morbid Angel's Altars of Madness did at the end of the decade, setting a new precedent for metal bands to reach. With the arguable exception of Chuck Schuldiner's Death, never before had a heavy metal band carried their lightning-fast guitar riffs and equally spellbinding guitar solos into such horrific territory. Venom and Slayer redefined the extent to which a metal band could align itself with all things evil during the beginning of the decade, but Morbid Angel made these two groups sound like children's music compared to the Florida-based group's assaulting death metal sounds and their blasphemous lyrics.

Morbid Angel toured for nearly two years in support of Altars of Madness. The tour started in November 1989 when they opened for Napalm Death, Carcass and Bolt Thrower in the UK and Europe on the Grindcrusher Tour. Most of 1990 and 1991 were spent touring North America, playing with bands such as Pantera, Obituary, Atheist, Death Angel, Forbidden, Sanctuary, Ripping Corpse, Deicide, Sacrifice and Wrath. The Altars of Madness tour ended in April 1991 with a Brazilian tour, supported by Sarcófago, Sextrash and Cambio Negro.

=== Rise to success (1991–1995) ===
In 1991, Morbid Angel released their second album, Blessed Are the Sick, which was met with widespread critical acclaim, and is considered by many to be a landmark release in the death metal genre. Morbid Angel toured worldwide in support of Blessed Are the Sick throughout 1991 and 1992, headlining a European tour with Sadus, Cathedral, Godflesh and Unleashed, a North American tour (also supported by Unleashed) and then a European tour with Entombed and Unleashed. They also were one of the opening acts (along with Kreator, Sepultura, Headhunter and Wolfsbane) for Motörhead on the "Christmas Metal Meetings '91" tour, and toured Australia for the first time.

Following the success of Altars of Madness and Blessed Are the Sick, Morbid Angel was signed by Irving Azoff to Giant Records for one album, with the option of five more. In late 1992, second guitarist Richard Brunelle was kicked out of the band due to alleged substance abuse; instead of replacing him, Morbid Angel moved on as a three-piece.

On June 22, 1993, the band released their third full-length album Covenant, which went on to sell over 150,000 copies in the United States alone. Their record label dedicated promotional resources to the album, and commissioned music videos for the songs "Rapture" and "God of Emptiness". These music videos were put on heavy rotation by MTV, and the latter also appeared on the television show Beavis and Butt-Head. The success of the album enabled the band to tour with Black Sabbath and Motörhead across the United States from February through March 1994, which David Vincent credits with helping the band significantly expand their audience. Morbid Angel also toured North America with Kreator and Paradise Lost, and Europe with Grave and Dismember.

The band released its fourth studio album, Domination, on May 9, 1995, which featured new guitarist Erik Rutan of Ripping Corpse. It proved to be a somewhat controversial album among fans, featuring a slower, more atmospheric and experimental sound than on previous albums. AllMusic describes the album's sound as "more groove-oriented". The album has gone on to sell over 100,000 copies in the United States alone. Regardless, following the release of the album, their record label dropped them from their roster.

=== Steve Tucker era (1996–2003) ===
In 1996, after the release of their live album titled Entangled in Chaos, David Vincent departed from Morbid Angel. He was replaced by Steve Tucker in 1997. They released their fifth full-length album Formulas Fatal to the Flesh in 1998, which was considered more aggressive and complex than their previous album Domination. With Tucker, the band went on to release Gateways to Annihilation and Heretic in 2000 and 2003 respectively. Tucker briefly left Morbid Angel in 2001 and was replaced by former Hate Eternal bassist and vocalist Jared Anderson. That year, the band joined Pantera, Skrape, Slayer and Static-X on the Extreme Steel Tour of North America, which was Pantera's last major tour with the Abbott brothers, guitarist Dimebag Darrell and drummer Vinnie Paul.

In 2002, Anderson left the band and Tucker re-assumed his position as bassist and vocalist.

=== Reunion with David Vincent (2004–2014) ===
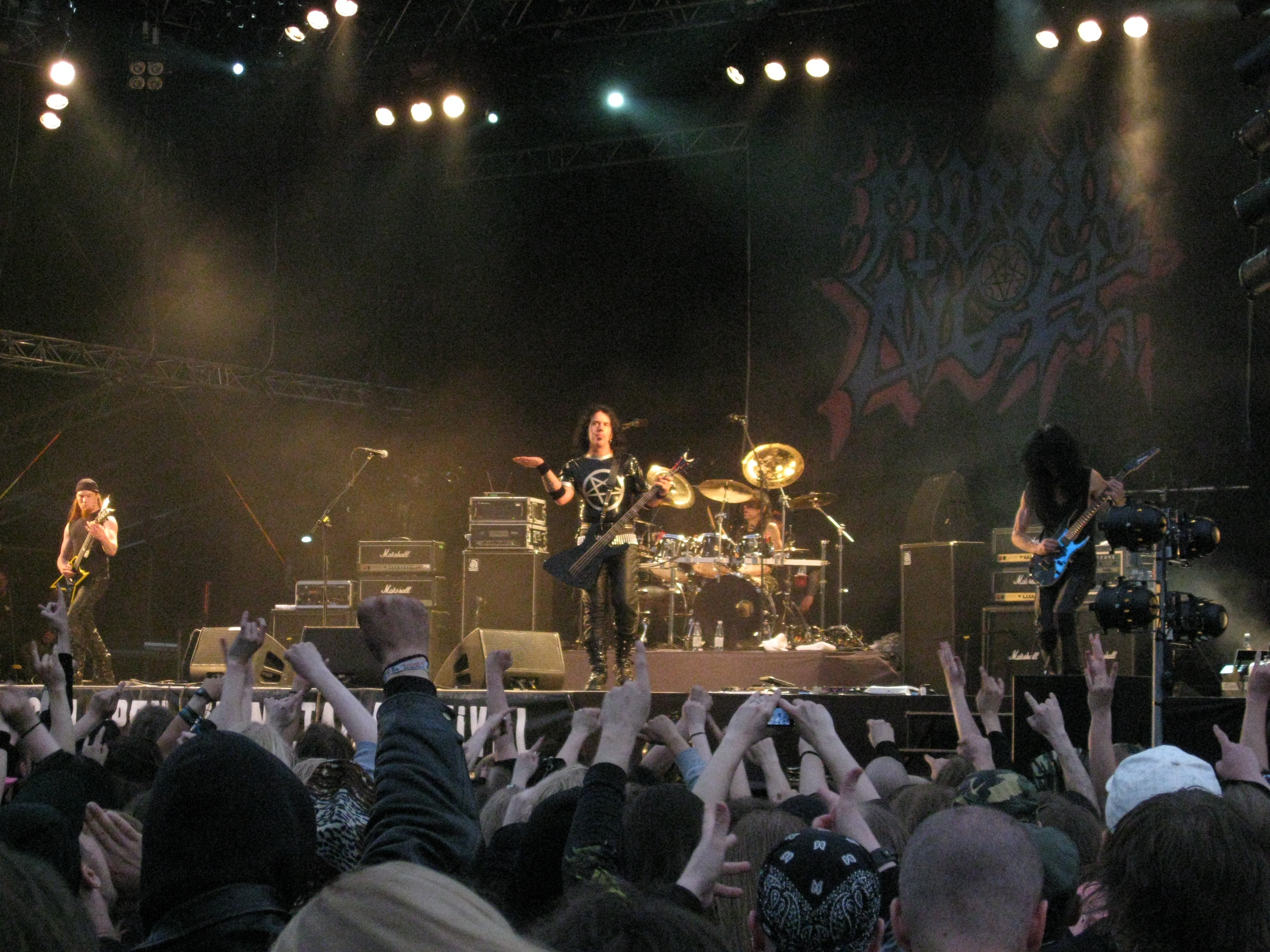
Morbid Angel in 2008

In 2004, Morbid Angel parted ways with Earache and Steve Tucker once again left the band, paving the way for former vocalist/bassist David Vincent to return. The band continued by touring and playing festivals such as Wacken Open Air in 2006.

Morbid Angel's appearance on some of the mid-summer 2008 European festivals was announced as a "short break from writing and pre-production of their new 8th studio album". In May 2008, it was announced that Destructhor from Zyklon would be the band's new guitarist, and Destructhor would appear on the new album.

On March 18, 2010, the band announced that Tim Yeung would play drums on the upcoming album, allowing Pete Sandoval to recover from back surgery. On June 22, the band entered the studio to begin the recording of their new full-length album. On March 5, 2011, the band headlined the Scion Rock Fest in Pomona, California. This performance was their first in the US in six years, aside from a one-off show in Los Angeles in May 2009. On March 9, Morbid Angel confirmed that their new album would be called Illud Divinum Insanus. The album was released on June 7 via Season of Mist. The album incorporated electronic sounds and deviated from the usual sound of the band. In an interview in December 2013, David Vincent confirmed that Pete Sandoval is no longer a member of the band, claiming that Sandoval had "found Jesus", and stating, "Pete Sandoval and Morbid Angel are not compatible", laying to rest speculation that Sandoval would eventually be returning to the band.

Asked in a December 2014 interview about Morbid Angel's plans for 2015, Vincent replied, "We're done [touring] for awhile. It's time to write." Yeung said that the band was in talks of recording an EP.

=== Reunion with Steve Tucker (2015–2022) ===
On June 15, 2015, it was reported that David Vincent and Tim Yeung were no longer in Morbid Angel. Former vocalist/bassist Steve Tucker shortly rejoined the band once again. Later that day, however, Vincent denied that he had left the band. On his official Facebook page, Tucker hinted in a post on June 17 that Destructhor was no longer part of Morbid Angel either: "Who will play second guitar? Time will answer that one ..." On June 18, this was confirmed, as Destructhor announced his departure from the band to focus on the Norwegian death metal band Myrkskog. The next day, Vincent confirmed his departure due to creative differences. Both he and Yeung teamed up together in late 2016 to form the band I Am Morbid. On August 3, Morbid Angel was signed to UDR Music and was at work on a new studio album, which would be released in 2017, with a tour to follow. Yeung state in an interview with Metal Addicts that "I’ve been waiting to break the news for a while about this. Now seems like the proper time to do so. As some of you know, there have been some lineup changes with Morbid Angel. Unfortunately, due to financial differences, I will not be continuing with them. It has been a great five years being involved with Morbid Angel. I’ve met a ton of great people all over the world, played some amazing shows, and have a ton of great memories as well as stories. I wish Trey (Azagthoth) and Morbid Angel all the best. As for myself, I’m always up for the next opportunity life throws my way."

On January 9, 2017, Trey Azagthoth announced on his Facebook page that drummer Scott Fuller joined Morbid Angel for the recording of their new album. Additional details indicated that the album title would presumably start with the letter "K", given the band's history on naming their albums alphabetically. On January 10, the band announced that Dan Vadim Von has joined as second guitarist. They also announced a U.S. tour with Suffocation, Revocation and Withered, which would begin in late May and continue into late June. In a March interview on The Metal Magdalene with Jet show on Metal Messiah Radio, Steve Tucker explained that the album would be a "death metal album". When speaking to Orlando Weekly in May 2017, Tucker said that the tour setlist would not feature any David Vincent era material and would then perform songs featuring him instead. He also said that they would play "probably one or two new songs" from the new album, in which he said that it was "almost done, but we don't want to put out too much with YouTube putting it up the next day." On the opening night on May 23, they performed a new song entitled "Warped". Morbid Angel canceled their European appearance twice due to passport issues from one of the members. The band's management explained that a new passport would not be issued in time for the shows. The band expressed disappointment with the news and issued an apology. On October 5, the cover artwork for the forthcoming album titled Kingdoms Disdained was revealed, which was released on December 1 by Silver Lining Music. Later that day, the brand new song "Piles of Little Arms" was made available for streaming, followed by "For No Master" on November 29.

Morbid Angel toured the U.S. in the spring of 2018 with Misery Index and Origin, performing on separate legs. In early 2019, Morbid Angel and Cannibal Corpse toured together for the first time ever, promoted by heavy metal magazine Decibel, with Necrot and Blood Incantation as additional support. Immolation replaced Cannibal Corpse for the final week of the tour.

In a February 2019 interview with Metal Wani, Tucker stated that Morbid Angel was planning to begin working on a new album that year: "I'm gonna actually start writing some new music, and I think Trey will probably start writing some new music. We'll probably do a couple of more tours throughout the year. We have some stuff that's being talked about now, but nothing concrete. It's that time. It's been a little bit over a year since the last album came out. I've kind of got the urge and desire myself to write some more music. So we'll start getting into that and continue doing shows." In March 2019, Morbid Angel appeared on the Adult Swim television series FishCenter Live.

On September 27, 2019, it was made public that former Morbid Angel guitarist Richard Brunelle died on September 23 at age 55. The cause of death remains unknown.

=== United States Tour of Terror and Apollo Theatre collapse (2023–present) ===
In celebration of their 40th anniversary, Morbid Angel embarked on a five-week North American tour called the United States Tour of Terror in March–April 2023, featuring session drummer Charlie Koryn. Support acts on this tour included Revocation and Crypta.

During the March 31, 2023, show in Belvidere, Illinois, the roof of the concert venue collapsed after it was struck by an EF1 tornado, resulting in the death of one concertgoer, and injuries to at least 40 others.

Morbid Angel was originally scheduled to take part in the Devastation on the Nation tour, commencing on November 15, 2024, but was dropped from the lineup due to unforeseen circumstances and was replaced by I Am Morbid.

On July 13, 2026, original vocalist/drummer Mike Browning died at the age of 62.

== Musical style ==
Morbid Angel is a death metal band, though its style of music has undergone a number of changes throughout its musical career. Generally, the band's sound is characterised by harsh, growled vocals, technically complex guitarwork that frequently makes use of fast tremolo-picking and palm-muted riffs. Trey Azagthoth's guitarwork is a core part of the band's sound, and his atonal "shredding" style has been likened to the guitar work in Slayer. Pete Sandoval's work behind the drums has also been crucial to the band's sound; he "is known for his great double bass drum speed and technical proficiency" and as one of the fastest drummers in metal. In addition, "Sandoval is also among the first extreme metal drummers to champion the use of acoustic drum triggers." According to David Vincent, "In the early days of [the band] we pretty much just isolated ourselves and we did what we did. And we weren't really necessarily [...] trying to copy anyone because, well, there wasn't anything to copy; there was nothing that sounded like what we were doing. And we just sort of blazed our own trail, and thankfully and fortunately, it translated and it became a thing. But again, there were a lot fewer bands back then. So the fact that of the bands that were out there, everybody was unique sort of in their own style."

On their early albums, they pushed metal to its most extreme level, musically and lyrically. The band has evolved their anti-Christian lyrical themes from these early works. On Altars of Madness, the lyrics largely consist of simple blasphemous and overtly Satanic proclamations. However, the sophistication and depth of the lyrics has grown over time. On their 1993 album Covenant, the band articulate more broadly anti-theistic lyrics, and profess "anger at a higher power". Today, "the band's lyrics are even more philosophical and thought-provoking. Current lyricist Trey Azagthoth has diagramed his personal ideology in the album Formulas Fatal to the Flesh. His stance is blasphemous and non-traditional, but hardly evil." Azagthoth stated in an interview, "I'm not evil as far as, 'I want to hurt people'".

== Influence and legacy ==
Morbid Angel has been one of the most highly influential bands in the growth and development of death metal along with death metal band Cannibal Corpse. Former guitarist Erik Rutan went on to form the successful death metal band Hate Eternal, while the South Carolina band Nile have gone on to enjoy significant levels of success in a similar style of death metal. Their sound has also heavily influenced the growth and development of death metal and black metal in South America, as well as of the early black metal scene in Norway. Many bands have cited Morbid Angel as an influence on their own music, including Obituary, Immortal, Krisiun, Gorguts, Behemoth, Dead Congregation, Gojira, Opeth, Pyrrhon, Revocation, and many others. The influence of Morbid Angel has also been observed in the work of Hate Eternal and Nile. Bands outside the United States influenced by Morbid Angel include the Brazilian projects Abhorrence, Nephasth, Rebaelliun, and Mental Horror, and European black metal bands such as Emperor, Zyklon, and Dimmu Borgir.

Their early release Abominations of Desolation as well as Altars of Madness are considered two of the earliest true examples of death metal, as well as two of the most boundary-pushing albums of their time in terms of extremity. Metalsucks named them one of the most important bands of the 1990s, writing that "The band released three seminal albums — Blessed Are the Sick, Covenant, and Domination — between 1991 and 1995 alone (and there are definitely fans who'd say we're being unfair to 1998's Formulas Fatal to the Flesh). And thanks to a little show called Beavis and Butt-Head, Morbid Angel became death metal's ambassadors to the outside world, acting as the gateway drug for who even knows how many scores of kids."

Guitarist Trey Azagthoth is one of the most influential and widely revered guitarists in heavy metal. Loudwire named him one of the top 10 rock and metal "riff lords", writing that "Trey Azagthoth left his fingerprints all over the early death metal scene with a unique riffing style still unmatched within the genre today. [...] His unconventional style sounds haphazard in its approach, awkwardly stepping over piles of rubbles left from previous riffing attacks, but with crushing effect." VH1 has described him as "a unique and thrilling lead player more following in the adventurous footsteps of Eddie Van Halen than a stiff tactician." SPIN wrote that "he has blazed a tension-filled style all his own" and that "when he solos, he enters a mystical mind state he calls the "Temple of Ostx".

During the nineties, the band were one of a number of bands involved in the scare created around death metal, and were featured in a news report about the issue due to the band's overtly Satanic and occult lyrics and imagery.

== Members ==
Current members

- Trey Azagthoth – guitars, keyboards (1983–present)
- Steve Tucker – bass, vocals (1997–2001, 2003–2004, 2015–present)
- Dan Vadim Von – guitars (2017–present)
- Charlie Koryn – drums (2023–present)

== Discography ==
The band's studio and live albums are notable for being released in alphabetical order (Altars of Madness, Blessed Are the Sick, Covenant, and so on), with guitarist Trey Azagthoth commenting that it was a coincidence regarding the first two albums, but that it has been done consciously since then.

=== Studio albums ===
Year	Album details	Peak chart positions										Sales
Year	Album details	US	US Heat.	US Ind.	CHE	FIN	FRA	GRC	NLD	SWE	UK	Sales
1989	Altars of Madness: Released: May 12, 1989; Label: Earache	—	—	—	—	—	—	—	—	—	—	US: 67,485+ (Note: Culminative United States sales figures for Altars of Madness as of July 2004. This does not include copies sold before Nielsen SoundScan began tracking sales data on May 25, 1991.)
1991	Blessed Are the Sick: Released: May 22, 1991; Label: Earache	—	—	—	—	—	—	26	81	—	—	US: 83,396 (Note: Culminative United States sales figures for Blessed are the Sick as of July 2004.)
1993	Covenant: Released: June 22, 1993; Label: Giant	—	24	—	—	—	—	—	—	—	—	US: 153,000+
1995	Domination: Released: May 9, 1995; Label: Giant	—	13	—	—	—	—	—	93	—	124	US: 99,000+
1998	Formulas Fatal to the Flesh: Released: February 24, 1998; Label: Earache	—	22	—	—	—	—	—	93	—	—	US: 45,000
2000	Gateways to Annihilation: Released: October 17, 2000; Label: Earache	—	—	—	—	—	—	—	—	—	—	US: 38,000+
2003	Heretic: Released: September 23, 2003; Label: Earache	—	27	28	—	—	146	—	—	—	—	US: 31,000+
2011	Illud Divinum Insanus: Released: June 7, 2011; Label: Season of Mist	141	3	24	97	18	—	—	—	41	—	US: 7,570+
2017	Kingdoms Disdained: Released: December 1, 2017; Label: Silver Lining Music	—	—	—	73	31	—	—	169	—	—	
"—" denotes a release that did not chart.

=== Live albums ===
Year	Album details
1996	Entangled in Chaos: Released: 1996; Label: Earache
2015	Juvenilia: Released: 2015; Label: Earache

=== Compilation albums ===
Year	Album details
2012	Illud Divinum Insanus – The Remixes: Released: February 28, 2012; Label: Season of Mist
2016	The Best of Morbid Angel: Released: September 30, 2016; Label: Earache

=== Demo albums ===
Year	Album details	Peak chart positions
Year	Album details	NLD
1991	Abominations of Desolation: Released: September 2, 1991; Label: Earache	77

=== EPs ===
Year	EP details
1994	Laibach Re-mixes: Released: 1994; Label: Giant
2017	Complete Acid Terror: Released: 2017; Label: Silver Lining Music

=== Singles ===
Year	Song	Album
1988	"Thy Kingdom Come"	Non-album single
1991	"Fall from Grace"	Blessed Are the Sick
1991	"Abominations"	Blessed Are the Sick
1991	"Day of Suffering"	Blessed Are the Sick
1991	"The Ancient Ones"	Blessed Are the Sick
1993	"Rapture"	Covenant
1994	"God of Emptiness"	Covenant
1995	"Where the Slime Live"	Domination
2001	"Opening of the Gates"	Gateways to Annihilation
2011	"Nevermore"	Illud Divinum Insanus
2017	"Piles of Little Arms"	Kingdoms Disdained

=== Music videos ===
Year	Song	Director	Album
1989	"Immortal Rites"		Altars of Madness
1991	"Blessed Are the Sick/Leading the Rats"	Wayne Gillian	Blessed Are the Sick
1993	"God of Emptiness"	Tony Kunewalder	Covenant
1993	"Rapture"	Tony Kunewalder	Covenant
1995	"Where the Slime Live"		Domination
2003	"Enshrined by Grace"	Pete Bridgewater	Heretic
2012	"Existo Vulgoré"	Thomas Mignone	Illud Divinum Insanus
2018	"Garden of Disdain"	Nader Sadek	Kingdoms Disdained
2019	"Architect And Iconoclast"	Adult Swims Centre	Kingdoms Disdained

== See also ==
- Florida death metal
- Satanic panic
