= Abominations of Desolation =

Demo album by Morbid Angel
- Released: September 2, 1991
- Recorded: 1986
- Genre: Death metal
- Length: 42:33
- Label: Earache
- Producer: David Vincent

Morbid Angel chronology
| Blessed Are the Sick (1991) | Abominations of Desolation (1991) | Covenant (1993) |

Professional ratings
Review scores
| Source | Rating |
|---|---|
| AllMusic | 2/5 stars |
| The Encyclopedia of Popular Music | 3/5 stars |

Abominations of Desolation was the intended debut album by Florida death metal band Morbid Angel. While originally recorded in 1986, the band decided not to release it at the time.

== Background and recording ==
It is specified on the cover that it was intended to be their first full-length album, yet unreleased, which would make Altars of Madness their proper debut. The band recorded and promoted the album, but the plans were shelved after vocalist Mike Browning left the band in 1986 due to an altercation with Trey Azagthoth. The album was recorded by producer David Vincent, who persuaded the band to fire bassist John Ortega and hire Sterling Von Scarborough. Vincent became the band's vocalist shortly afterwards.

Most of the songs were reworked and appeared on later Morbid Angel albums. "Chapel of Ghouls", "Lord of All Fevers and Plague", and "Welcome to Hell" (renamed "Evil Spells") can be heard on Altars of Madness. "Unholy Blasphemies", "Abominations" and "Azagthoth" (renamed "The Ancient Ones") are on Blessed Are the Sick. "Angel of Disease" was recorded for Covenant, and "Hell Spawn" appeared on Formulas Fatal to the Flesh as "Hellspawn: The Rebirth". To date, "Demon Seed" is the only song from these sessions that has not been re-recorded for a full-length album.

== Track listing ==
| No. | Title | Length |
|---|---|---|
| 1. | "The Invocation/Chapel of Ghouls" ("Chapel of Ghouls" later recorded for Altars of Madness) | 7:11 |
| 2. | "Unholy Blasphemies" (later recorded for Blessed Are the Sick) | 4:00 |
| 3. | "Angel of Disease" (later recorded for Covenant) | 5:35 |
| 4. | "Azagthoth" (later recorded for Blessed Are the Sick as "The Ancient Ones") | 5:49 |
| 5. | "The Gate/Lord of All Fevers" (later recorded for Altars of Madness as "Lord of All Fevers and Plague") | 5:55 |
| 6. | "Hell Spawn" (later recorded for Formulas Fatal to the Flesh as "Hellspawn: The Rebirth") | 2:32 |
| 7. | "Abominations" (later recorded for Blessed Are the Sick) | 4:20 |
| 8. | "Demon Seed" | 2:12 |
| 9. | "Welcome to Hell" (later recorded for Altars of Madness as "Evil Spells") | 4:56 |
| Total length: | | 42:33 |

== Release ==
The album was recorded in 1986, though the planned release was canceled. These recordings would later be released in 1991 at the decision of the band's record label, Earache Records.

== Personnel ==
Morbid Angel

- Mike Browning – drums, vocals
- Trey Azagthoth – guitars
- Richard Brunelle – guitars
- John Ortega – bass

Additional personnel

- Mark Craven – artwork
- L. Barry – layout
