= Blessed Are the Sick =

Studio album by Morbid Angel
- Released: May 22, 1991
- Recorded: January – February 1991
- Studios: Morrisound Recording, Tampa
- Genre: Death metal
- Length: 39:24
- Labels: Earache; Relativity
- Producer: Morbid Angel

Morbid Angel chronology
Altars of Madness (1989)	Blessed Are the Sick (1991)	Abominations of Desolation (1991)

Blessed Are the Sick is the second studio album by American death metal band Morbid Angel, released on May 22, 1991 through Earache Records. The album followed the band's landmark debut Altars of Madness, and is similarly regarded as a seminal release in the then-burgeoning death metal genre.

== Background ==
After the release of their debut, Altars of Madness, Morbid Angel toured for nearly two years in support of the album, starting in November 1989 opening for Napalm Death, Carcass and Bolt Thrower in the UK and Europe on the Grindcrusher Tour. Their touring continued in North America with bands such as Pantera, Obituary, Atheist, Death Angel, Forbidden, Sanctuary, Ripping Corpse, Deicide, Sacrifice and Wrath, ultimately concluding their efforts in April 1991 with a Brazilian tour, supported by Sarcófago, Sextrash and Cambio Negro.

In between tours, the band would return to Morrisound Recording in Florida to record and produce their second album, which would become Blessed Are the Sick.

== Composition and musical style ==
Though the album features some fast sections, the overall sound is markedly slower than the debut, with identifiable classical music undertones present (main composer Trey Azagthoth would dedicate this album to Mozart). Tracks 9, 10 and 12 are re-recorded songs from the 1986 demo Abominations of Desolation. According to Chris Krovatin of Kerrang, "while Altars is straight-up death metal horror, Blessed is a strange and static album, with Morbid Angel's more straightforward moments peppered between arcane, Lovecraftian passages of twisting guitars and off-kilter drumming. It's a starker and more unique approach to the genre, and one that set Morbid Angel apart from the rest of the blood-drenched pack."

Blessed Are the Sick's tracks have been described as "semi-catchy," and the album as a whole has been called "short [and] to the point." The album's lyrics explore the "drug-fueled religious theories of guitarist Trey Azagthoth." His shred guitar style has drawn comparisons to Eddie Van Halen.

== Release ==
The album was released on May 22nd, 1991. The cover painting is "Les Trésors de Satan" by Jean Delville. The album was reissued in 2009 as a digipak in DualDisc format. The CD side contains the original audio release and the DVD side contains a one-hour documentary.

== Reception and legacy ==
Professional ratings
Review scores
Source	Rating
About.com	4.5/5 stars
AllMusic	4/5 stars
The Encyclopedia of Popular Music	3/5 stars
The Great Metal Discography	6/10

The album has received acclaim since its release, and like its predecessor and successor, Altars of Madness and Covenant respectively, is regarded as a death metal landmark. Bradley Torreano of AllMusic commended the band for not "[wasting] time noodling on forgettable riffs and needless tempo changes the way so many of their contemporaries did," and said they joined "the upper class of death metal bands" with the album.

Writing for About.com, Chad Bowar would write, "Their 1989 debut Altars of Madness was a seminal release, but 1991's Blessed Are the Sick took them to an even higher level," adding, "Guitarist Trey Azagthoth's wizardry is well-established, and on full display here, but second guitarist Richard Brunelle also deserves credit for the outstanding axework found on the album."

== Track listing ==
All lyrics are written by David Vincent, except where noted; all music is composed by Trey Azagthoth, except "Desolate Ways" by Richard Brunelle.

No.	Title	Lyrics	Length
1.	"Intro" (instrumental)		1:27
2.	"Fall from Grace"		5:13
3.	"Brainstorm"		2:34
4.	"Rebel Lands"		2:41
5.	"Doomsday Celebration" (instrumental)		1:49
6.	"Day of Suffering"		1:54
7.	"Blessed Are the Sick/Leading the Rats"		4:47
8.	"Thy Kingdom Come"		3:24
9.	"Unholy Blasphemies"	Azagthoth, Vincent	2:10
10.	"Abominations"	Azagthoth	4:27
11.	"Desolate Ways" (instrumental)		1:40
12.	"The Ancient Ones"	Azagthoth	5:53
13.	"In Remembrance" (instrumental)		1:25
Total length:			39:24

== Personnel ==
Morbid Angel

- David Vincent – bass, vocals
- Trey Azagthoth – guitars, keyboards
- Richard Brunelle – guitars
- Pete Sandoval – drums

Additional personnel

- Tom Morris – engineering, mixing

== Release history ==
Date	Note
May 22, 1991	
November 3, 2009	Reissue
