= Heretic (Morbid Angel album) =

Studio album by Morbid Angel
- Released: September 23, 2003
- Recorded: DOW Studios, Seffner, Florida
- Genre: Death metal
- Length: 53:12; 1:09:44 (Bonus tracks); 32:20 (Bonus Levels)
- Label: Earache
- Producer: Juan "Punchy" Gonzalez, Morbid Angel

Morbid Angel chronology
Gateways to Annihilation (2000)	Heretic (2003)	Illud Divinum Insanus (2011)

Professional ratings
Review scores
Source	Rating
AllMusic	3/5 stars
Chronicles of Chaos	9/10
Collector's Guide to Heavy Metal	7/10
The Encyclopedia of Popular Music	2/5 stars
Metal.de	9/10
Ox-Fanzine	10/10
Rock Hard	9.5/10
Sputnikmusic	4/5 stars

Heretic is the seventh studio album by Florida death metal band Morbid Angel. This would be their last under Earache Records, as the band decided not to renew its contract, and also the last to feature Pete Sandoval and with Steve Tucker until his return on 2017's Kingdoms Disdained.

The album was recorded at Diet of Worms Studios by Juan Gonzalez. Heretic is the band's first album not recorded at Morrisound Recording.

The second track, "Enshrined by Grace", is featured on The Texas Chainsaw Massacre soundtrack. It had a music video that received airplay in the months following the album release.

Nile vocalist/guitarist Karl Sanders played the outro guitar solo on "God of Our Own Divinity".

The song "Born Again" is actually the outro guitar solo from the song "Secured Limitations" from 2000's Gateways to Annihilation.

== Track listing ==
The album was released in five different versions. The first simply contains Heretic in a standard CD case; the second is a box set featuring the album plus the 18-track CD Bonus Levels and a sticker—released in Germany only and limited to 10,000 copies; the third is a double-disc slipcase of both CDs—available only through US mail order and limited to 2,000 copies; the fourth features both discs in a double-CD jewel case—released in Europe only and limited to 20,000 copies; and the fifth is a 12-inch picture disc with no bonus CD limited to 1,500 copies.

All lyrics are written by Steve Tucker; all music is composed by Trey Azagthoth, except where noted.

No.	Title	Music	Length
1.	"Cleansed in Pestilence (Blade of Elohim)"		4:35
2.	"Enshrined by Grace"		4:27
3.	"Beneath the Hollow"		4:21
4.	"Curse the Flesh"		3:36
5.	"Praise the Strength"		5:16
6.	"Stricken Arise"	Pete Sandoval, Azagthoth	4:10
7.	"Place of Many Deaths" (instrumental)		4:14
8.	"Abyssous" (instrumental)		1:31
9.	"God of Our Own Divinity"		6:21
10.	"Within thy Enemy"		3:17
11.	"Memories of the Past" (instrumental)	Sandoval	3:18
12.	"Victorious March of Reign the Conqueror" (instrumental)	Sandoval	2:38
13.	"Drum Check" (instrumental)	Sandoval	2:52
14.	"Born Again" (instrumental)		2:35

Bonus tracks

The album contains additional tracks after "Born Again". Many of these are silent, while some contain guitar solos or ambiance (notably the sound effects from "Place of Many Deaths" on "Tortured Souls"). When ripped to a computer, the tracks with solos or songs have mostly comical names. The disc has 44 tracks and, according to interviews with Trey Azagthoth, the tracks' numbers and duration have some meaning.

Tracks not listed are silent. Names given are taken directly from the CD-Text on the disc.

No.	Title	Length
30.	"Inflections"	1:28
35.	"Tortured Souls" (sound effects from "Place of Many Deaths")	3:50
41.	"Terror of MechaGodzilla Lava" (the guitar solo in the end of "Praise the Strength")	0:33
42.	"Triplet Lava"	1:51
43.	"Doomcreeper" (instrumental version of "Beneath the Hollow")	4:30
44.	"Laff"	0:16

Bonus levels

A few pressings of the album were made with an extra disc called Bonus Levels. The first six tracks are all songs off the first disc, with synthesized drums and no vocals. The remaining tracks are guitar solos.

No.	Title	Length
1.	"Beneath the Hollow" (instrumental)	4:25
2.	"Curse the Flesh" (instrumental)	3:34
3.	"Within thy Enemy" (instrumental)	3:16
4.	"God of Our Own Divinity" (instrumental)	6:13
5.	"Praise the Strength" (instrumental)	5:15
6.	"Place of Many Deaths" (instrumental)	4:06
7.	"Beneath the Hollow" (guitar solo)	0:23
8.	"Curse the Flesh" (guitar solo)	0:16
9.	"Praise the Strength" (guitar solo)	0:16
10.	"God of Our Own Divinity" (guitar solo)	0:36
11.	"Summoning Redemption" (guitar solo 1)	0:28
12.	"Summoning Redemption" (guitar solo 2)	0:24
13.	"Summoning Redemption" (guitar solo 3)	0:28
14.	"Ageless, Still I Am" (guitar solo 1)	0:38
15.	"Ageless, Still I Am" (guitar solo 2)	0:24
16.	"At One with Nothing" (guitar solo 1)	0:30
17.	"At One with Nothing" (guitar solo 2)	0:32
18.	"To the Victor the Spoils" (guitar solo)	0:36

== Chart positions ==
Chart (2003)	Peak
Top Heatseekers	27
Top Independent Albums	28

== Personnel ==
=== Morbid Angel ===
- Steve Tucker – bass, vocals
- Trey Azagthoth – guitars, guitar synthesizer, keyboards
- Pete Sandoval – drums, piano, keyboards

=== Guest ===
- Karl Sanders – outro guitar solo of "God of Our Own Divinity"

=== Others ===
- Juan "Punchy" Gonzalez – production, mixing
- Marc Sasso – cover art
- Peter "Drunken Monkey" Tsakiris – design
- Alex Solca – photography
