= Pete Sandoval =

American drummer

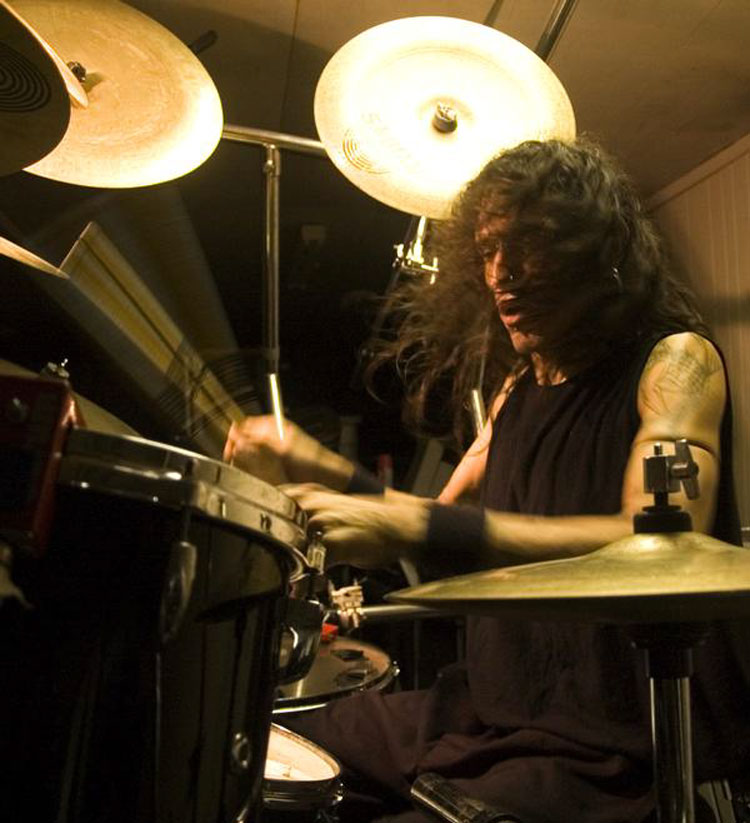

Background information
- Also known as: Commando, Pete the Feet
- Born: May 21, 1964 (age 62)
- Origin: Santa Ana, El Salvador
- Genres: Death metal, grindcore, deathgrind
- Occupation: Drummer
- Years active: 1985–present

Pedro Rigoberto "Pete" Sandoval (born May 21, 1964) is a Salvadoran-born American drummer, best known for his work with extreme metal bands Morbid Angel, Terrorizer and I Am Morbid.

According to Jason Birchmeier of AllMusic, Sandoval "challenges one's perception of how fast a drummer can possibly drum."

== Career ==
His first significant stint as a drummer was for the grindcore band Terrorizer, formed in 1986, where he began to demonstrate some of his talent. Heavily influenced by the grindcore music around him, Sandoval quickly developed his abilities as a drummer with little formal training or musical education. In 1988, Sandoval was invited to join the death metal band Morbid Angel. Concurrently, the original lineup of Terrorizer was dissolved after the departures of Sandoval and guitarist Jesse Pintado (who subsequently joined Napalm Death).

Sandoval had never used two bass drums before joining Morbid Angel. He had to practice frequently in order to get his feet up to speed, and recorded the Altars of Madness album within only a couple of months of joining Morbid Angel. According to Morbid Angel guitarist Trey Azagthoth, the band would occasionally walk in on Sandoval passed out on the floor in a pool of sweat. After being woken up, he would immediately say, "Time to get back to work!" After mastering the double-bass technique in Morbid Angel, Sandoval also implemented it in Terrorizer's World Downfall album when the band briefly re-united to record it.

According to former singer David Vincent, the band once played a prank on Sandoval by making him listen to a band that used a preprogrammed drum machine, and pretended it was a real drummer who could play faster than he could. Sandoval was gutted, and went on to practice until he managed to play faster than the machine.

In 2010, he had to undergo surgery to repair a prolapsed disc. Not being able to play painlessly for an extended period for up to a year, he was replaced by Tim Yeung for the recording and touring of Morbid Angel's 2011 album Illud Divinum Insanus.

In December 2013, David Vincent stated in an interview that Sandoval was no longer with Morbid Angel, citing incompatibility with the band after Sandoval's conversion to Christianity as the reason.

In a 2014 interview, Sandoval said that his beliefs would not affect Terrorizer's music or lyrical content, explaining that his faith had given him a positive outlook on life.

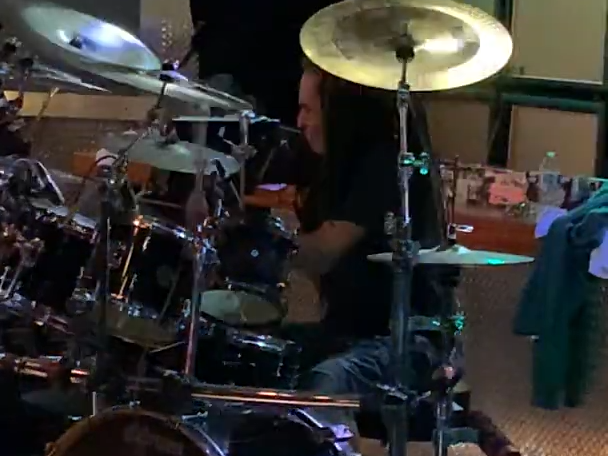
Sandoval performing with Terrorizer in 2019

Sandoval explains that the reason for his split from Morbid Angel was not a religious matter, but having the time to recover from his back surgery which took much longer than he had expected, as the band would not wait for him to recover, thus prompting them to find a new drummer. He also mentioned that after the recording of Terrorizer's 2012 album Hordes of Zombies was when he converted to Christianity and his life started to change, crediting his mother and sister for their encouragement. Sandoval said that he would not have continued to perform in the band after his conversion due to his newfound religious differences with them. When asked if he misses performing with Morbid Angel, he said, "No, I don't. I don't miss it. I don't miss any of that." His relationship with any of the band members has been without any negativity on either side and was non existent for many years until late 2021 when Sandoval reconnected with David Vincent (a few years after his own split from Morbid Angel) in Vincent’s own group I Am Morbid when Sandoval’s other commitments were largely put on hold due to Terrorizer’s temporary hiatus.

The spring of 2022 saw Sandoval and Vincent touring as part of I Am Morbid, with Sandoval taking over from Tim Yeung, who incidentally was among the drummers to join Morbid Angel after Sandoval left.

Sandoval announced in late September 2026 that he was no longer part of I Am Morbid. He explained that he wanted to play a greater variety of Morbid Angel songs than the ones that the band played, which were focused on material from the albums Altars of Madness through Domination.

== Influences ==
Sandoval cited Clive Burr as a "huge influence" on his first year of drumming. Other significant influences include Dave Lombardo, Gene Hoglan and Neil Peart.

== Personal life ==
Sandoval is a born-again Christian. He is autistic.

== Discography ==
=== Morbid Angel ===
- Altars of Madness (1989)
- Blessed Are the Sick (1991)
- Covenant (1993)
- Domination (1995)
- Formulas Fatal to the Flesh (1998)
- Gateways to Annihilation (2000)
- Heretic (2003)

=== Terrorizer ===
- World Downfall (1989)
- Darker Days Ahead (2006)
- Hordes of Zombies (2012)
- Caustic Attack (2018)
