= Dead Congregation =

Greek death metal band

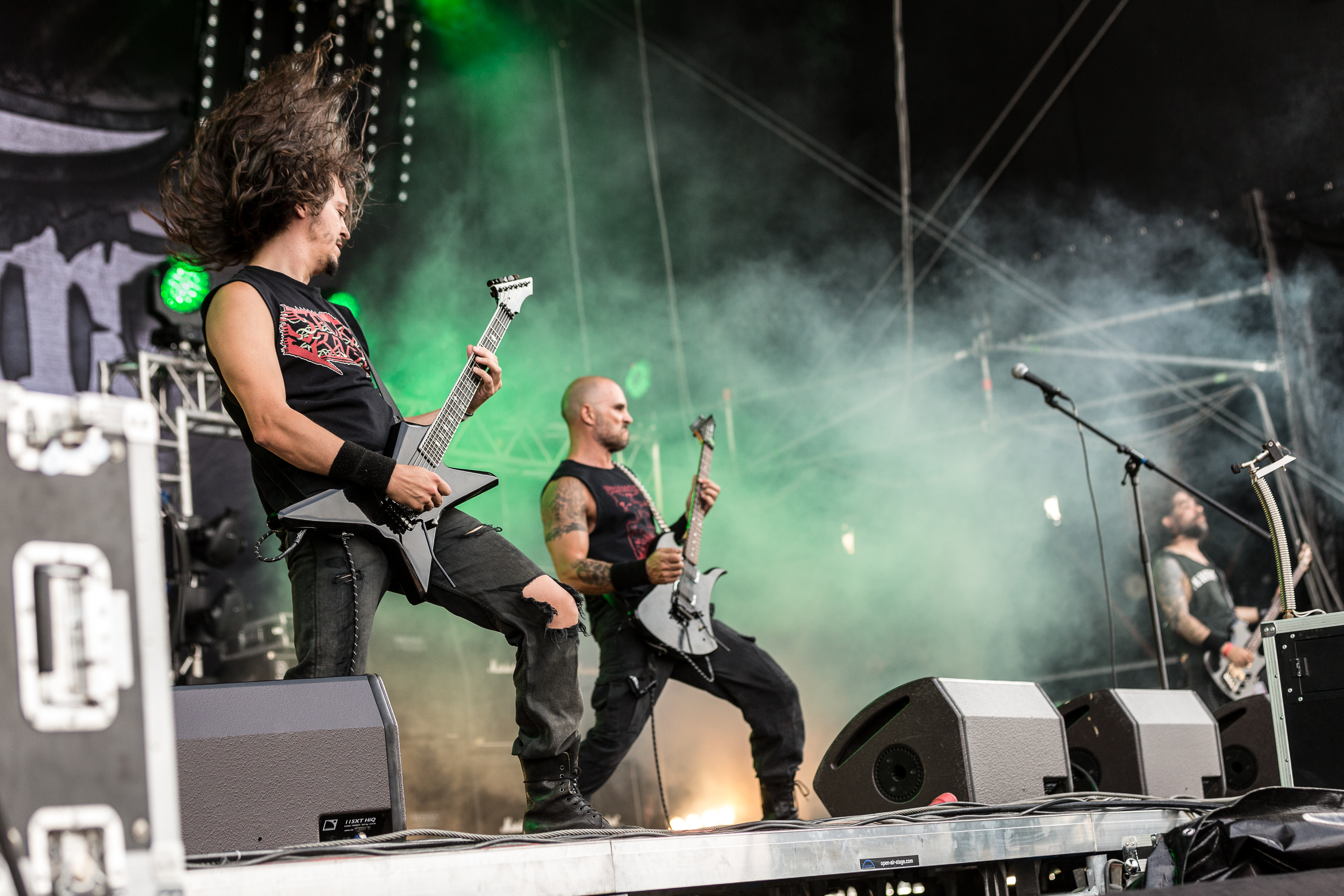
- Dead Congregation - At Party.San Metal Open Air 2018 in Obermehler-Schlotheim, Germany

Background information
- Origin: Athens, Attica, Greece
- Genres: Death metal
- Years active: 2004–present
- Labels: Nuclear Winter, Nuclear War Now!, Martyrdoom, Profound Lore
- Website: deadcongregation.com

Dead Congregation is a Greek death metal band from Athens formed in 2004. The band have released two full-length albums, two EPs, and a split release with Hatespawn. They released their latest full-length album Promulgation of the Fall on May 5, 2014, through their own label, Martyrdoom Productions, and on November 7, 2016, they released their EP Sombre Doom. The band's name is derived from the title of a song written in their previous band Nuclear Winter.

== History ==
The band was founded by lead guitarist and vocalist Anastasis Valtsanis after the split-up of Nuclear Winter. Nuclear Winter started as a crust punk band that later incorporated some influences from the early Swedish death metal scene. Their debut release was a self-financed EP that blended those styles. After a long hiatus, the band released a split with Incriminated from Finland in 2000. Before the break-up of Nuclear Winter, Valtsanis recorded one last demo with the band. After one bandmate quit the group, Valtsanis recorded the Abomination Virginborn demo as the band's chief songwriter.

Valtsanis said in an interview that "it was clear that we needed to form a new band, as Nuclear Winter was never my brainchild, and thus I needed to distance myself from anything with which I couldn’t relate to 100% musically, aesthetically or ideologically. We’d been friends with T.K. already, we knew he was a competent guitarist, and after all three of us rehearsed together for the first time, it was more than obvious that the line-up was complete. Soon after the first songs were ready, we were so confident in our material that we didn’t even record a demo, instead we went in the studio and recorded 5 songs that became our debut EP, Purifying Consecrated Ground." The EP was released on May 1, 2005, through Konqueror Records to positive reviews. AllMusic's Cosmo Lee described it as "a formidable opening salvo in their war against modernity." Blabbermouth gave the EP 7/10 and said the songwriting "stands apart from the failures of disingenuous imitators by putting work into the song structures. Varying tempos that run from the plodding and doomy to fast and vicious (with moments that approach raw black metal), there is plenty of meat on the bone here."

They released their debut full-length album, Graves of the Archangels, on January 30, 2008, in collaboration with Nuclear War Now! Productions. The album received critical praise and has gained an underground following since its release. Blabbermouth praised the album as a step up from their EP, writing that "It is one of those albums that is demonstrative of the whole being greater than the sum of its parts." Particular praise was directed towards the songwriting, atmosphere, and the interplay between the guitarists. Sputnik Music's Tyler Munro gave the album 4.5/5, writing that "pulls absolutely no punches. As said, it's an absolutely massive sounding album. Lose your focus and the album quite literally turns to background noise. The guitars continually overlap into an ocean of riffs. They splash around and when one guitar isn't doing something the other is. Everything layers unto itself and make no mistakes that the intention here is to deafen the listener in the most traditional of fashions." He concluded by arguing that "Graves of the Archangels is not only one of the best metal releases of the year, but quite possibly one of the best in recent memory." On April 1, they released a split EP with Hatespawn. It was named by Pitchfork's Brandon Stosuy as the fifth best metal album of 2008. He later wrote that "It was my favorite death metal album of the year and it's only gotten better since".

Following a period of inactivity, in April 2014, the band announced the title and artwork of their second-full-length album, Promulgation of the Fall. The album was released on May 16, 2014, in collaboration with Profound Lore Records and Norma Envagelium Diaboli. Promulgation of the Fall received critical acclaim from Pitchfork, Sputnik Music, Exclaim!, Metal Injection, and was featured on a number of year-end lists. Exclaim! wrote that "while Promulgation of the Fall can't take advantage of the element of surprise, burdened with the weight of expectation, the record is no less brilliant, displaying exquisite technical refinement. As glorious as the riffs are, the drumming steals the show here, elemental and mind-altering in its simultaneous precision and ravenousness. The transitions on the album in particular are something to behold, such as the way that the title track opens like a wound and gives way to the massive, crawling "Serpentskin," or the way the ecstatic violence of "Nigredo" shudders, hunches and splits into "Schisma." Located firmly in the liminal space between the abject and the sublime, the fascinatingly repulsive and the awfully beautiful, Promulgation of the Fall is a rare death metal accomplishment."

On September 30, 2016, the band announced that they would release a new EP titled Sombre Doom on November 7th in collaboration with Norma Envagelium Diaboli, and on October 25 began streaming the EP.

In 2018, the band stated that they were composing material for a new studio album. However, as of 2026 this has not come into fruition. The band has continued to tour, including a US tour with Phrenelith and Witch Vomit and in April 2023. The band played at Prague Death Mass in the fall of 2023.

== Musical style ==
Dead Congregation play a style of death metal with significant emphasis on atmosphere rather than speed or technicality, and has been described as "uncompromisingly brutal in a subsuming, freeing way." Comparisons have been frequently made to death metal bands such as Incantation, Immolation, and Morbid Angel, and are often described as "old-school" death metal, in reference to their influence from older death metal styles. The band have stressed the importance of "feeling and atmosphere above all." Valtsanis said that "The same riff can sound completely different if you alter important factors such us sound, drumming, the way you hit the chords on the guitar and many more. But in the end it’s all about the atmosphere a recording creates, if it doesn’t ooze of death and morbidity then it shouldn’t be labeled as Death Metal simply because the vocals are distorted and the drums are fast." He went on to describe their sound as "just darkened Death Metal the way we perceive it as true."

== Members ==
- Anastasis Valtsanis – vocals, lead guitar (2004–present)
- Vagelis Voyiantzis – drums (2004–present)
- T.K. – rhythm guitar (2004–present)
- George Skullkos – bass (2012–present)

== Discography ==
- Purifying Consecrated Ground (EP, 2005)
- Graves of the Archangels (2008)
- Dead Congregation / Hatespawn (split, 2008)
- Promulgation of the Fall (2014)
- Sombre Doom (EP, 2016)
