= Formulas Fatal to the Flesh =

Studio album by Morbid Angel
- Released: February 24, 1998
- Recorded: 1997
- Studios: Morrisound Recording, Tampa, Florida
- Genre: Death metal
- Length: 51:38
- Label: Earache
- Producer: Trey Azagthoth

Morbid Angel chronology
Domination (1995)	Formulas Fatal to the Flesh (1998)	Gateways to Annihilation (2000)

Professional ratings
Review scores
Source	Rating
AllMusic	3/5 stars
Chronicles of Chaos	10/10
Collector's Guide to Heavy Metal	7/10
The Encyclopedia of Popular Music	3/5 stars
Metal.de	9/10

Formulas Fatal to the Flesh is the fifth studio album by American death metal band Morbid Angel, released on February 24, 1998, by Earache Records. The Satanic-themed lyrics of the band's previous albums had been replaced with lyrics about the Old Ones, which would become the primary source of Morbid Angel's lyrical content from this point on, with some lyrics written in Sumerian. This is the first album to feature singer/bassist Steve Tucker, who replaced David Vincent.

== Music ==
The tunings for this record as on Covenant and Domination remained E♭ on six string guitar songs, and B♭ on seven stringed guitar songs. The album saw considerable changes in tone from Domination. Whereas Domination was more melodic, Formulas is considered more brutal and powerful, characterized by very fast drum tempos, extremely fast blast beats, aggressive riffs, atmospheric solos, and a more demonic growl from Steve Tucker.

"Invocation of the Continual One" is made of unused music the band had composed in its early days in 1984, put together and re-recorded for this album. It is also the only Morbid Angel song Trey Azagthoth does all the vocals for.

== Reception ==
The album was met with mixed reviews from critics upon release, but retrospective reception has been very positive.

== Track listing ==
All songs written and arranged by Trey Azagthoth except "Ascent Through the Spheres" and "Hymnos Rituales de Guerra", written by Pete Sandoval.

No.	Title	Length
1.	"Heaving Earth"	3:54
2.	"Prayer of Hatred"	4:28
3.	"Bil Ur-Sag"	2:30
4.	"Nothing Is Not"	4:44
5.	"Chambers of Dis"	3:30
6.	"Disturbance in the Great Slumber" (instrumental)	2:32
7.	"Umulamahri"	4:34
8.	"Hellspawn: The Rebirth"	2:43
9.	"Covenant of Death"	6:08
10.	"Hymn to a Gas Giant" (instrumental)	1:04
11.	"Invocation of the Continual One"	9:47
12.	"Ascent Through the Spheres" (instrumental)	2:02
13.	"Hymnos Rituales de Guerra" (instrumental)	2:43
14.	"Trooper" (instrumental)	0:55
Total length:		51:38

Limited edition "Love of Lava" bonus disc

This bonus CD contains all of the isolated guitar solos performed by Trey Azagthoth. A guitar pick is included which is signed by him.

No.	Title	Length
1.	"Heaving Earth Lava"
2.	"Heaving Earth Lava 'Alt'"
3.	"Prayer of Hatred #1 Lava"
4.	"Prayer of Hatred #2 Lava"
5.	"Prayer of Hatred #3 Lava"
6.	"Bil Ur-Sag #1 Lava"
7.	"Bil Ur-Sag #2 Lava"
8.	"Bil Ur-Sag #3 Lava"
9.	"Nothing Is Not Lava"
10.	"Nothing Is Not Lava 'Alt'"
11.	"Chambers of Dis #1 Lava"
12.	"Chambers of Dis #1 Lava 'Alt'"
13.	"Chambers of Dis #2 Lava"
14.	"Chambers of Dis #2 Lava 'Alt'"
15.	"Umulamahri #1 Lava"
16.	"Umulamahri #2 Lava"
17.	"Umulamahri #2 Lava 'Alt'"
18.	"Umulamahri #3 Lava"
19.	"Umulamahri #3 Lava 'Alt'"
20.	"Hellspawn #2 Lava"
21.	"Hellspawn #3 Lava"
22.	"Covenant of Death #1 Lava"
23.	"Covenant of Death #2 Lava"
24.	"Covenant of Death #3 Lava"
25.	"Invocation #1 Lava"
26.	"Invocation #2 Lava"
27.	"Dominate Lava"
28.	"Dominate Lava 'Alt'"
29.	"Dawn of the Angry #1 Lava"
30.	"Dawn of the Angry #1 Lava 'Alt'"
31.	"Dawn of the Angry #2 Lava"
32.	"Burn with Me #1 Lava"
33.	"Burn with Me #1 Lava 'Alt'"
34.	"Burn with Me #2 Lava"
35.	"Burn with Me #2 Lava 'Alt'"
36.	"Burn with Me #3 Lava"
37.	"Burn with Me #3 Lava 'Alt'"
38.	"Eyes to See #1 Lava"
39.	"Where the Slime Live Lava"
40.	"Where the Slime Live Lava 'Alt'"

== Personnel ==
- Steve Tucker – bass, vocals
- Trey Azagthoth – guitars, keyboards, vocals on "Covenant of Death" and "Invocation of the Continual One"
- Pete Sandoval – drums
