= Domination (Morbid Angel album) =

1995 studio album by Morbid Angel

Studio album by Morbid Angel
- Released: April 25, 1995
- Recorded: November 1994 – January 1995
- Studio: Morrisound Recording, Tampa
- Genre: Death metal
- Length: 44:45
- Label: Giant (US); Earache (UK)
- Producer: Morbid Angel; Bill Kennedy

Morbid Angel chronology
Covenant (1993)	Domination (1995)	Formulas Fatal to the Flesh (1998)

Professional ratings
Review scores
Source	Rating
AllMusic	4/5 stars
Chicago Tribune	2.5/4 stars
Collector's Guide to Heavy Metal	7/10
Kerrang!	4/5 stars

Domination is the fourth studio album by American death metal band Morbid Angel, released on April 25, 1995 in the United Kingdom and May 9, 1995 in the United States. This was Morbid Angel's last album with Giant Records before the label dropped the band. The band then re-signed with their former label, Earache Records. This is also the first Morbid Angel album to feature Hate Eternal frontman Erik Rutan on guitars and keyboards, who later left the band following this album, though he would return to the band for Gateways to Annihilation.

The CD cover is shown here. The LP artwork is a similarly styled image of statues in a desert. Initial copies came in a green jewelcase. There was also a limited edition "Slime Pack" planned, which was never released after several packs leaked before shipping and the slime-substance was found to be toxic.

A music video was produced for the song "Where the Slime Live".

David Vincent left the band in 1996 after the end of Domination tour cycle and was replaced by Steve Tucker. Vincent rejoined Morbid Angel in 2004 and appeared on their 2011 album Illud Divinum Insanus before leaving the band once again in 2015.

== Track listing ==
All lyrics are written by David Vincent; all music is composed by Trey Azagthoth, except where noted.

No.	Title	Music	Length
1.	"Dominate"		2:39
2.	"Where the Slime Live"		5:26
3.	"Eyes to See, Ears to Hear"	Azagthoth, Erik Rutan	3:52
4.	"Melting" (instrumental)	Rutan	1:20
5.	"Nothing but Fear"	Rutan	4:31
6.	"Dawn of the Angry"		4:39
7.	"This Means War"	Rutan	3:12
8.	"Caesar's Palace"		6:20
9.	"Dreaming" (instrumental)		2:17
10.	"Inquisition (Burn with Me)"		4:33
11.	"Hatework"	Rutan	5:47

Bonus tracks on Japanese version
No.	Title	Length
12.	"Sworn to the Black" (Laibach remix)	4:16
13.	"God of Emptiness" (Laibach remix)	5:37

== Personnel ==
=== Morbid Angel ===
- David Vincent – bass, vocals
- Trey Azagthoth – guitar, keyboards
- Erik Rutan – guitar, keyboards
- Pete Sandoval – drums

=== Production ===
- Morbid Angel – arrangement, production
- Bill Kennedy – production, engineering, mixing
- Mark Prator – assistant engineering
- Eric Cadieux – programming, digital editing
- Alan Yoshida – mastering
