= Illud Divinum Insanus =

2011 studio album by Morbid Angel

Studio album by Morbid Angel
- Released: June 7, 2011
- Recorded: June 2010 – January 2011
- Studios: Mana Recording Studios, St. Petersburg; Red Room Recorders, Tampa; D.O.W. Studios, Mango; The Blue Room, Laurel Canyon
- Genres: Death metal; industrial metal
- Length: 56:38
- Label: Season of Mist
- Producer: Morbid Angel

Morbid Angel chronology
Heretic (2003)	Illud Divinum Insanus (2011)	Kingdoms Disdained (2017)

Illud Divinum Insanus is the eighth studio album by American death metal band Morbid Angel, released on June 7, 2011 by Season of Mist. The album marks a shift in the band's sound, incorporating elements of industrial metal. It is Morbid Angel's first album since Heretic (2003), the band's longest gap to date between studio albums. This is the only Morbid Angel album to feature guitarist Destructhor and drummer Tim Yeung, the latter sitting in for Pete Sandoval, who was recovering from surgery. It is also the band's only album to feature bassist/vocalist David Vincent since he rejoined in 2004.

== Music, writing and recording ==
Illud Divinum Insanus is the band's only album featuring Norwegian guitarist Destructhor, the first with bassist/vocalist David Vincent since Domination (1995), and the first to not include longtime drummer Pete Sandoval, who had undergone back surgery when recording began. Former Hate Eternal drummer Tim Yeung recorded the drum tracks for this album. Vincent said that with the exception of "Omni Potens", which features a "march" programmed by him on a keyboard, all of the album's instrumentation was "played". He also said that Yeung "played all the drums, just with different sources."

Illud Divinum Insanus took more than five years to materialize. Work on the album began in 2006, and it was originally going to be released in 2007, but was pushed back several times while the band continued touring and writing new material. After four years of writing, Morbid Angel began development on the album from June 2010 to January 2011 at several studios including Mana Recording Studios and Red Room Studios for the drum recording, and D.O.W. Studios for the bass, guitars, and vocals. Illud Divinum Insanus was mixed in Hollywood, California, with Sean Beavan.

Trey Azagthoth was influenced by electronic music in the years prior to Illud Divinum Insanus, and said the album had songs that were inspired by terrorcore, hardcore and industrial music. According to Vincent, the songwriting process for Illud Divinum Insanus differed from Morbid Angel's previous albums. Instead of demoing songs with a drum machine and telling the other members how a song idea would work, Azagthoth brought in "weird mixtapes on which he mashed stuff together"; Vincent said most of the demos Azagthoth brought in at the beginning of rehearsals reflected his interest in dubstep and techno. The drum tracks recorded with Rutan at Mana Recording Studios were later edited by Azagthoth to sound like his mixtapes.

== Promotion and release ==
"Nevermore" single cover

The cover art for the album was unveiled on March 30, 2011. It was designed by Brazilian artist Gustavo Sazes, who commented:

To create this cover we worked from several references, ideas, elements, and I would say a 'world' of options and paths. After a long brainstorming period and some [good and bad] ideas left behind, we came up with the concept of this organic surreal insane being; a fallen God or a weird mirror image of our own madness. It is a different Morbid Angel cover for sure, but I think that's how Morbid Angel is...Deviant and different on each new release. They never repeat themselves. They are always pushing the boundaries and setting new standards. I'm really proud of the final results and hope the fans appreciate my work, while listening to the new album!

The album's track listing and information of various release formats were unveiled on April 5, 2011. Prior to the release of the album, a single for the song "Nevermore" was made available on May 16 as a digital download and on 7" vinyl. The cover artwork for the single was designed by French artists Valnoir and Fursy Teyssier for Metastazis. The single also contains an exclusive version of the song "Destructos vs. the Earth", remixed by Combichrist.

Of all the remixes I've been asked to do I never expected one of the world's most notorious death metal bands to have an interest in hearing their music on the dance floor. However, "Destructos" is one of those tracks that are so versatile that it could have been recorded as a folk song and it would still sound amazing. I'm honored to be a part of this project and am excited to see how the Morbid Angel fans react to this unusual new direction.

— Andy LaPlegua

In 2012, a double remix album called Illud Divinum Insanus – The Remixes was released.

== Reception ==
Professional ratings
Review scores
Source	Rating
About.com	4/5 stars
AllMusic	4/5 stars
Blabbermouth.net	4.5/10
Decibel	5/10
Fearnet	(mixed)
Metal Forces	7/10
Metal Hammer	9/10
Metalsucks	1/5 stars

The album received mixed reviews from critics and generated a strong backlash from fans, many of whom were dissatisfied with the group's attempt to add an industrial element to the album. Louisville Music News labeled the album a "failed experiment" and a "joke", and described Illud Divinum Insanus as Morbid Angel's St. Anger, in reference to the Metallica album. Metal Injection gave the album 3/10 and described the album as "a joke" and an "overall bummer to listen to." They criticised the lack of heavy, interesting guitarwork and Pete Sandoval's absence from the album, writing that "Instead, we’re left with fifty-six plodding minutes of (mostly) forgettable death metal and/or offensively terrible industrial metal." They also highlighted David Vincent's lyrics for particular criticism, describing them as "atrocious" and "pretty awful pretty much the entire time". Blabbermouth criticised the album, particularly for the programmed drums, and argued that even the four best tracks on the album sounded "uninspired and even if the band dumped blood, sweat and tears into these songs, that still wouldn't make up for the fact that a track like "Radikult" takes up space on the same album."

Conversely, Phil Freeman of Allmusic said that while "those who love the band's earliest records...are bound to see Illud Divinum Insanus' experiments with industrial...as betrayals of everything the group once stood for", "many of the songs on Illud...are as raw and savage as anything the band's ever recorded", and that the album is "a left turn by a band that's already made many of them throughout its...career". Metal Hammer gave 9/10, describing the album as "a twisted, confrontational masterpiece". The album received praise before its release from artists including Mikael Åkerfeldt from Opeth, Anders Nyström from Katatonia and several other metal artists, although these statements of praise all came out before the album was officially released. However, drummer Pete Sandoval disliked the album, saying, "I don't know why they did that with the DJs, they could've have [sic] just done a separate project without calling it a Morbid Angel album. That might have been better." Sandoval was unable to contribute to the recording of Illud Divinum Insanus due to injuries, and later left the band entirely.

Guitarist Trey Azagthoth calls the album "a confused effort", whose unfocused direction ultimately led to David Vincent's departure in 2015, and offers no apologies over the computerized beats and effects, with a comment about the song "Radikult", calling it "a silly song", "...I had nothing to do with that thing." Erik Rutan has blamed the album's sound on miscommunications with Azagthoth and/or Vincent.

== Track listing ==
All lyrics are written by David Vincent; all music is composed by Trey Azagthoth and Vincent, except where noted.

No.	Title	Music	Length
1.	"Omni Potens" (instrumental)	Vincent	2:28
2.	"Too Extreme!"		6:13
3.	"Existo Vulgoré"		3:59
4.	"Blades for Baal"	Destructhor	4:52
5.	"I Am Morbid"	Vincent	5:16
6.	"10 More Dead"	Destructhor	4:51
7.	"Destructos vs. the Earth / Attack"		7:15
8.	"Nevermore"		5:07
9.	"Beauty Meets Beast"		4:56
10.	"Radikult"	Vincent	7:37
11.	"Profundis - Mea Culpa"		4:05
Total length:			56:38

== Personnel ==
Personnel per liner notes.

=== Morbid Angel ===
- David Vincent – bass, vocals, keyboards
- Trey Azagthoth – guitars
- Destructhor – guitars
- Tim Yeung – drums

=== Production ===
- Sean Beavan – engineering, mixing
- Gunter Ford – management
- Juan "Punchy" Gonzalez – engineering
- Mark Prator – engineering
- Erik Rutan – engineering
- Gustavo Sazes – cover art, design

== Charts ==
Chart performance for Illud Divinum Insanus
Chart (2011)	Peak position
Finnish Albums (Suomen virallinen lista)	18
German Albums (Offizielle Top 100)	61
Swedish Albums (Sverigetopplistan)	41
Swiss Albums (Schweizer Hitparade)	97
US Billboard 200	141
US Top Hard Rock Albums (Billboard)	13
US Heatseekers Albums (Billboard)	3
US Independent Albums (Billboard)	24
US Indie Store Album Sales (Billboard)	18

== Bibliography ==
- Badin, Oliver (June 2011). "Divine Resurrection". Terrorizer. No. 210. Dark Arts Ltd. pp. 19–24.
- Vincent, David; McIver, Joel (2020). I Am Morbid: Ten Lessons Learned From Extreme Metal, Outlaw Country, And The Power Of Self-Determination. Jawbone Press. ISBN 978-1911036555.
