= Wrath (band) =

American progressive thrash metal band

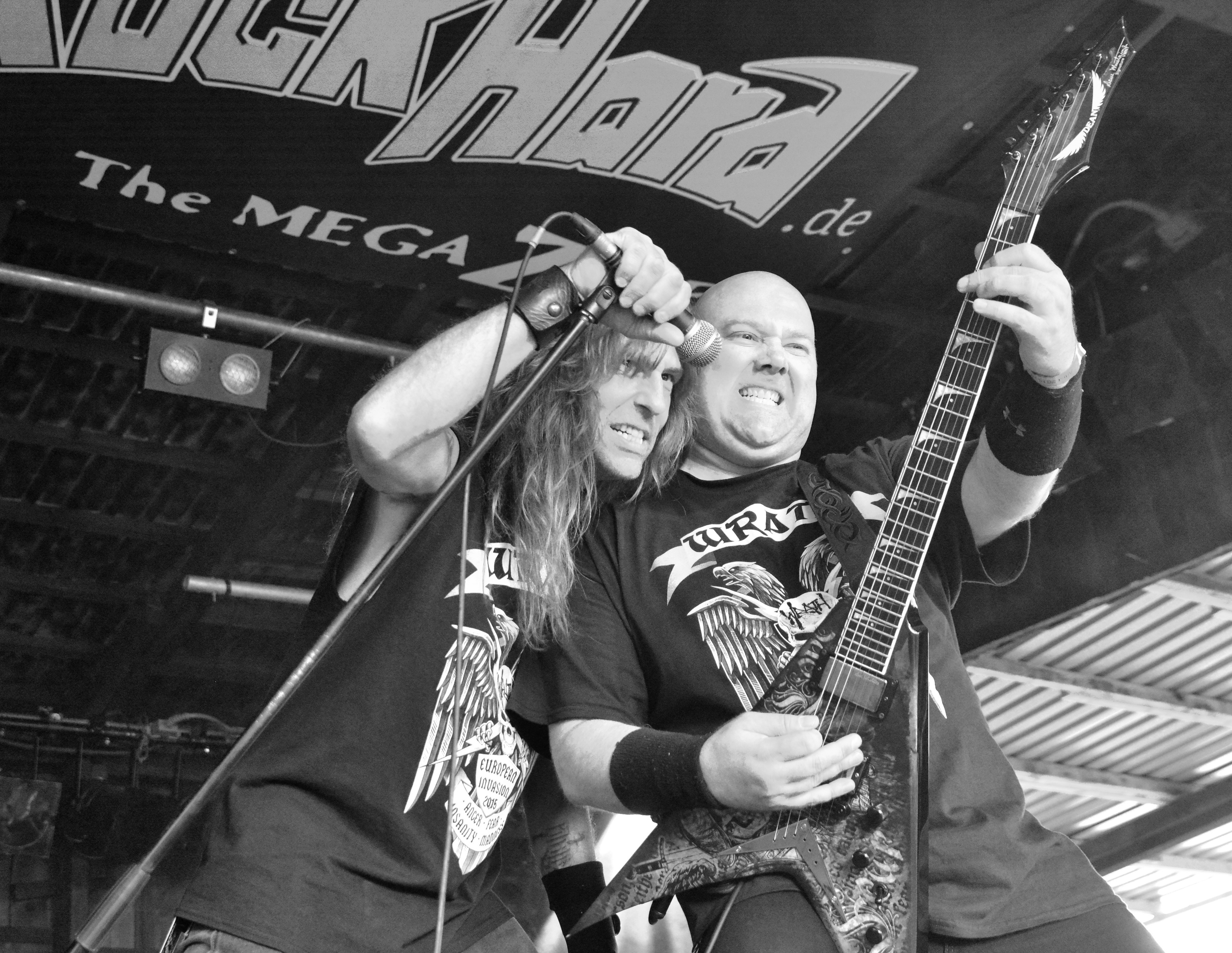
- The band at Headbangers Open Air 2015

Background information
- Origin: Chicago, Illinois, United States
- Genres: Thrash metal, Progressive metal
- Years active: 1982–Present
- Labels: King Klassic Records, Medusa Records, Combat Records
- Members: Gary Modica; Brian Cashmore; Gary Golwitzer; Rob Noon; Jake Fromkin
- Past members: Rick Rios; Chris Wisco; John Duffy; Mike Nyrkkanen; Mike Fron; Dave Sollman; Kurt Grayson; Scott Matrise; Patt Maxwell; Scott Nyquist

Wrath is an American progressive thrash metal band founded in 1982.

== Music style ==
The band plays progressive, technically demanding thrash metal which has been referred to as "Tech-Thrash" or "Speed-Tech." They have been compared to groups such as Watchtower, Mekong Delta, Coroner and Hexenhaus.

== Members ==
Current lineup

- Gary Modica – Bass (1982–present)
- Brian Cashmore – Guitars (2020–present)
- Gary Golwitzer – Vocals (1983–1988, 2015–present)
- Dave Sollman-Drums (1989-2009)(2024–present)
- Rob Noon – Guitars (2007–present)

Past members

- Rick Rios – Drums (1982–1986)
- Chris Wisco – Guitars (1982)
- John Duffy – Vocals (1982–1983)
- Mike Nyrkkanen – Guitars (1982–1991)
- Mike Fron – Drums (1983–1989)
- Dave Sollman – Drums (1989–2009)
- Kurt Grayson – Vocals (1989–1991, 2007)
- Scott Matrise – Vocals (2012–2015)
- Patt Maxwell - Drums (2009-2016)
- Scott Nyquist – Guitars (1984–2020)
- Jake Fromkin- Drums (2016-2024)

== Discography ==
- Children of the Wicked (Demo, 1985, Eigenveröffentlichung)
- Demo 85 (Demo, 1985, Self-released)
- Fit of Anger (Studio album, 1986, King Klassic Records)
- Nothing to Fear (Studio album, 1987, Medusa Records)
- Insane Society (Studio album, 1990, Medusa Records)
- Demo 92 (Demo, 1992, Self-released)
- Wrath E.P. (EP, 2008, Self-released)
- Stark Raving Mad (Studio album, 2014, Self-released)
- Rage (Studio album, 2018, Combat Records)
