= Covenant (Morbid Angel album) =

Studio album by Morbid Angel
- Released: June 1, 1993
- Studios: Morrisound Recording, Tampa
- Genre: Death metal
- Length: 41:12
- Labels: Giant (US); Earache (UK)
- Producers: Flemming Rasmussen; Morbid Angel

Morbid Angel chronology
Abominations of Desolation (1991)	Covenant (1993)	Domination (1995)

Covenant is the third studio album by American death metal band Morbid Angel, released on June 1, 1993 in the United Kingdom and on June 22, 1993 in the United States. The album proved to be the band's breakthrough, due to their contract with Giant Records and its widespread exposure on MTV's Headbangers Ball, as well as the music video for "God of Emptiness" appearing on Beavis and Butt-head. It is frequently described as one of the greatest death metal albums of all time, and a landmark album in the genre, influencing countless future metal bands, including Mithras, Portal, and Dead Congregation. According to Nielsen Soundscan, Covenant was the best selling death metal album as of 2003, with sales of over 150,000 in the United States alone. In 2017, Rolling Stone named it the 75th best metal album of all time.

== Background ==
In the late 1980s, a number of heavy metal and thrash metal bands, such as Metallica, Slayer, Anthrax, and Megadeth, enjoyed significant mainstream success, while "Iron Maiden went heavy on synths" and "Testament actually wrote a song called 'The Ballad'". In music journalist Michael Nelson's view, there was a growing feeling that "the scene was getting co-opted, going soft, cashing in." By the early-to-mid-1990s, thrash metal had largely given way to death metal as it continued to push the limits of extreme metal, while its mainstream acceptability grew partly due to the collaboration between Earache and Columbia Records. Covenant's release through Earache and Giant Records (a subsidiary of Warner Bros. Records) therefore represented one of the most significant releases of that time period, and 1993 is widely credited as one of death metal's highest peaks. Morbid Angel's success with their previous two albums gained them a one-album record deal (with the option of five more) with Giant in the spring of 1992. Later that same year, second guitarist Richard Brunelle was kicked out of the band due to alleged substance abuse, meaning that Covenant was recorded as just a trio.

== Recording ==
Covenant was produced by Morbid Angel and Flemming Rasmussen, engineered by Rasmussen and Tom Morris at Morrisound Recording in Tampa, Florida, and was mixed by Rasmussen at Sweet Silence Studios in Copenhagen, Denmark. Rasmussen was responsible for producing three of Metallica's most famous albums: Ride the Lightning, Master of Puppets and ...And Justice for All. In an interview with Metal Hammer, David Vincent explained that the band chose him to mix the album because:

"We wanted a different approach and Flemming proved to be a treat to work with. Besides, he was there from the beginning. He even came in earlier than scheduled so he could attend few of our rehearsals prior to us entering the studio. Ultimately, he turned out to be pretty meticulous, especially on how the drums should sound. Then we did both the vocals and guitars on our own and Trey and I flew to Copenhagen to mix the whole thing with him."

The track "Angel of Disease" was originally written in 1985 for Abominations of Desolation, but was re-recorded for Covenant; Abominations of Desolation went unreleased until 1991. The first song written for Covenant was the opening track "Rapture", which Vincent claims "set the tone" for the rest of the album. The closing track "God of Emptiness" was "almost like a vision. I had a dream that awoke me up in the middle of the night and I literally then on the spot wrote that song, humming my ideas into a small tape recorder."

== Music and lyrics ==
The album's lyrics, written by David Vincent, draw heavily on occult, mythological, and Satanic themes, including theistic Satanism, Sumerian religion, and Nietzschean philosophy. Michael Nelson wrote that part of the success of the album was due to the band's success at reflecting these themes musically, particularly due to Trey Azagthoth's guitarwork. Writing for Stereogum on the album's 20th anniversary, Nelson described Azagthoth's work: "His guitars seemed to mimic surreal horrors of nature — whirlpools or wildfires — more than they did any musicians of his era. At the time, the most celebrated guitarist in death metal was Chuck Schuldiner of Death, a dazzlingly proficient hyper-shredder with few technical equals. Azagthoth, on the other hand, delivered queasy, nitrous leads that called to mind the most extreme work of free-jazz/grindcore saxophonist John Zorn." An entry on AllMusic explains that "Guitarist Trey Azagthoth plays complicated, heavily detuned riffs, some with a lightning-fast picking style and others in a slower groove. Drummer Pete Sandoval is one of the genre's fastest, and his jackhammer style helps complete Morbid Angel's core sound." The album also serves as a rejection of many mainstream musical conventions, and, Nelson of Stereogum also describes, "is never a catchy record. That's partly because the album is essentially devoid of anything resembling a traditional 'chorus,' but it's mostly due to the uppermost layers of sound — the things on which the ear and imagination immediately focus. Covenant squeals and reels wildly; the band's odd and ever-changing time signatures leave little room for grooves."

== Artwork ==
The album's cover image shows a page from The Book of Ceremonial Magic by Arthur Edward Waite to the right, and a reproduction of "The Pact of Urbain Grandier" on the left. It is Morbid Angel's first album to feature a photograph as the album cover rather than an illustration. It was designed in collaboration with the band and shot by Earache employee Martin Nesbitt, and was designed to reflect the album's philosophy. In an interview with Metal Hammer, Vincent claimed that:

"We wanted something that was solemn and sort of like… (he pauses) Not a rulebook per se but it had to suggest the idea of a pact, an allegiance if you will. Overall, we wanted something timeless and about commitment. We felt that this record being what it was, who we were and its subject matter, it was like our covenant to ourselves and to ourselves. And as a bonus, if you look closely enough, you'll find many little details that are references to a specific lyric of song from that album included in there."

== Release and promotion ==
Morbid Angel's label Giant Records (and its parent company Warner Bros. Records) devoted promotional resources to the album, commissioning two music videos for the tracks "Rapture" and "God of Emptiness", both directed by Tony Kunewalder. David Vincent explained in an interview that "Those were the times when labels were still living the high life and they thought nothing of spending too much money on good videos". Further, "They were connected to each other, although shot six months apart and we had the same director for both of them named Tony Kunewalder. He was a very artistic guy that wasn't into metal at all but he was a pleasure to work with. The weirdest part is that soon after the God Of Emptiness shooting, he died in a fire on a set of another video soon afterwards so it means that was one of the last things he ever did." These music videos received heavy rotation on MTV, particularly on the network's heavy metal-oriented program Headbangers Ball. The video for 'Rapture' premiered on Headbangers Ball and was followed by a video interview with David Vincent. The music video for "God of Emptiness" was also featured on the series Beavis and Butt-head. According to Nielsen Soundscan, Covenant went on to sell over 150,000 copies in the United States alone.

In November 2013, in commemoration of its 20th anniversary, the album was remastered and reissued by Earache in a "Full Dynamic Range" edition on CD and vinyl.

== Touring ==
Following the commercial success of the album and its exposure by MTV in particular, in early 1994 the band toured with Black Sabbath and Motörhead. The tour, which featured over 20 dates, began in New Britain, Connecticut on February 8, 1994. David Vincent sees Covenant as a vital record for the band in this respect: "We got support from MTV and to tour with Black Sabbath and Motörhead in early '94 in places we had never played before while a new wave of aggressive music was coming out. I think that overall, it helped us reach a whole new audience. Without Covenant, we wouldn't be where we are now and we're proud that it has stood the test of time like it did."

In 2013 and 2014, the band headlined North American and European tours to celebrate the 20th anniversary of the album's original release. Covenant was performed in its entirety on every date of the tour, followed by a selection of songs from the band's other albums.

== Reception and legacy ==
Professional ratings
Review scores
Source	Rating
AllMusic	4.5/5 stars
The Encyclopedia of Popular Music	3/5 stars
Kerrang!	1/5 stars
Metal Storm	9.6/10
MusicHound Rock	4/5 stars
Ox-Fanzine	3.5/5 stars
Record-Journal	A
Rock Hard	7.5/10

Covenant is widely considered to be a milestone in the death metal genre, arriving at (and representing) the genre's peak. The album's sales were almost unprecedented "for a band, album, and genre so relentlessly extreme." Following the success of Morbid Angel and particularly Covenant, Columbia Records licensed North American deals with several of Earache Records' other bands, including Carcass, Entombed, and Napalm Death, seeking to replicate the album's success. However, "none of those albums Soundscanned even a third of what Covenant did — worse still, none of them even outsold the previous respective albums by those bands." As a consequence, Columbia systematically dropped these bands from their rosters, cutting ties with all of them within three years.

Morbid Angel's next album Domination (1995) sold roughly 70,000 copies, but the band was nonetheless also dropped from Giant Records' roster. Furthermore, the lack of new, boundary-pushing death metal bands led to a relative stagnation in the genre. There was also a growing tension within the community, as the "inviting mainstream" seemed willing to "give some Death Metal a try", which was in conflict with the "essentially anti-mainstream culture that gave birth to and nourished the genre." The growth and development of Norway's black metal scene can be understood as a direct response to the temporary mainstream, commercial success that death metal enjoyed in these few years, "a violent negative reaction to death metal that could be traced directly back to Morbid Angel".

By late 1995, the genre had entered a period of decline. "The movement, however, did not die, and more death metal bands continued to deliver their extreme tunes. The scene simply retreated into the underground." In Michael Nelson's view, it was precisely in this retreat that the genre "regained its vitality. Today, the genre comfortably coexists (and regularly cross-pollinates) with black metal."

In 2017, Rolling Stone named it the 75th best metal album of all time. In 2025, Joe DiVita of Loudwire named the Covenant as the best death metal release of 1993. He wrote: "In 1993, death metal went commercial… sort of. [...] Covenant became the first death metal record to see a major label release, but there wasn’t a whiff of selling out in the air, steamrolling through another 10 tracks of Hell-born hymns. Sure, David Vincent’s vocals had become quite intelligible by now, but the tradeoff for this slight notion of “accessibility” paid dividends with the immediacy of the occult-driven lyrics. 'Bow to me faithfully' indeed."

== Track listing ==
All lyrics are written by David Vincent, except "Angel of Disease" by Trey Azagthoth; all music is composed by Azagthoth, except "Lions Den" by Vincent.

No.	Title	Length
1.	"Rapture"	4:17
2.	"Pain Divine"	3:58
3.	"World of Shit (The Promised Land)"	3:20
4.	"Vengeance Is Mine"	3:15
5.	"Lions Den"	4:45
6.	"Blood on My Hands"	3:43
7.	"Angel of Disease"	6:15
8.	"Sworn to the Black"	4:01
9.	"Nar Mattaru" (instrumental)	2:06
10.	"God of Emptiness: I: The Accuser; II: The Tempter"	5:27
Total length:		41:12

== Personnel ==
Morbid Angel

- David Vincent – bass, vocals
- Trey Azagthoth – guitars, keyboards
- Pete Sandoval – drums

Additional personnel

- Morbid Angel – production
- Tom Morris – engineering
- Flemming Rasmussen – production, engineering, mixing
- Luton Sinfield – photography
