= Altars of Madness =

Studio album by Morbid Angel
- Released: May 12, 1989
- Recorded: December 1988
- Studios: Morrisound Recording, Tampa
- Genre: Death metal
- Length: 38:53
- Labels: Earache; Combat (US)
- Producers: Dig; Morbid Angel

Morbid Angel chronology
Thy Kingdom Come (Demo) (1987)	Altars of Madness (1989)	Blessed Are the Sick (1991)

Altars of Madness is the debut studio album by American death metal band Morbid Angel. It was released in the UK by Earache Records on May 12, 1989 and in the United States by Combat Records on December 7, 1990. Considered a groundbreaking and important release in extreme metal, the album set a new precedent for heaviness and extremity in terms of lyrics and instrumentation. It is one of the most celebrated albums in death metal, and one of the most influential death metal albums of all time.

The album features a number of tracks that were originally recorded for what was supposed to be their debut album Abominations of Desolation, originally recorded in 1986 but not released until 1991.

== Background and recording ==
Speaking about his motivations at the time of writing and recording the album, Morbid Angel guitarist Trey Azagthoth recalled a strong desire to "engulf the whole world," "destroy everybody," and "smoke people." He was under the impression that bands in the Florida death metal scene were "trying to outdo" one another and "make each other quit," which he likened to the rivalries between East Coast and West Coast hip hop artists. He said, "I wanted to get onstage and have people go, "Holy shit - what the fuck is going on?" I wanted to write stuff that would make other bands run and hide. It's not really very nice, but that's what drove me."

The band was unhappy with the final product of Abominations of Desolation, Azagthoth in particular, who did not believe it was what he had envisioned. The band has explained that in many ways they felt unprepared when they entered the studio, despite them having practiced extensively beforehand.

Altars of Madness was recorded in December 1988 at Morrisound Recording in Tampa, Florida. The band chose the studio because it was located close to the band in Tampa, and considered it the preeminent studio at the time. David Vincent called it a "trial run", but that he was "really pleased that everything came together when it finally did."

Original vinyl and cassette pressings of Altars of Madness did not include "Lord of All Fevers and Plague"; this track has appeared as a bonus track on nearly all CD versions of the album (between "Maze of Torment" and "Chapel of Ghouls"), while the remastered 2002 release included remixes of three songs from the album, "Maze of Torment", "Chapel of Ghouls" and "Blasphemy". The album saw a 2006 DualDisc release with the 2002 remaster on the audio side and Live Madness 89 recorded at Nottingham Rock City on November 14, 1989, on the DVD side. The album was remastered and reissued by Earache Records in 2011 and 2015, and in May 2016 a 'Full Dynamic Range' remaster was released digitally and on vinyl. On November 23, 2018, there will be a digipak edition of the album, with remastered sound and the bonus tracks, along with a bonus clip of "Immortal Rites".

== Music and lyrics ==
The album is one of the earliest examples of death metal and is considered to have helped pioneer the sound along with Possessed's Seven Churches in 1985 and Death's Scream Bloody Gore in 1987. Additionally, the album is said to contain elements of speed metal. Though now described as sounding "raw and primitive," Altars of Madness is considered to be a musically groundbreaking album in extreme metal, and has been said to make the music of Morbid Angel's predecessors Slayer and Venom sound like "children's music" by comparison. It is said to be "crisper" and more coherent than releases from other extreme bands during the time, and the songwriting is said to contain hooks. Jason Birchmeier of AllMusic assessed that "never before had a heavy metal band carried their lightning-fast guitar riffs and equally spellbinding guitar solos into such horrific territory," and likened the band's speed to playing in "fast-forward mode." The album's sound has been described as "being hunted through forgotten tombs by diseased ghouls, slowly shedding the last rags of your sanity." The album's style has drawn comparisons to the "wilder moments" of early Napalm Death releases. The album's style is also characterized by extremely fast performances, complex compositions, and technically demanding musicianship, producing a "musical onslaught [that] will surely send children and parents running away in fear".

Frontman David Vincent's vocals have been described as "monstrous." His style derived influence from early English grindcore as well as from the death growls of Chuck Schuldiner of Death. The album's lyrical content explores themes such as Satanism and blasphemy, and are said to "seem far too sincere to be a pose". The album's tracks have also been called "awkward and chaotic tales of madness," drawing comparisons to Lovecraftian horror.

The guitar work of Trey Azagthoth has been described as "demented," and as sounding like he was "taking the guitar and making it wail as if it were slowly being melted." Azagthoth himself has noted that psychedelic music was an influence on his writing on the album, especially the work of Pink Floyd. When composing guitar solos on the album, he abandoned the use of traditional scales and said that "I would just pick an area on the guitar and play it without really looking at it. I'd connect it in a different way."

== Artwork ==
The cover artwork, by Dan Seagrave at age 18, depicts what he described as a "flat disk" composed of fossil material, shown to be imprisoning "captured souls". Altars of Madness was the first death metal release for which Seagrave had created an album cover, as he had previously worked with British thrash metal bands such as Warfare. According to Seagrave, the "disk" has been wrongly perceived as having been intended to look "spherical".

== Legacy ==
Professional ratings
Review scores
Source	Rating
AllMusic	3/5 stars
The Encyclopedia of Popular Music	4/5 stars
Entertainment Weekly	B
The Great Metal Discography	7/10
Kerrang!	5/5 stars
Hit Parader	2/5 stars
Metal Hammer	4/5 stars
Rock Hard	7.5/10
Terrorizer	9/10

Many death metal fans and critics consider Altars of Madness to be one of the best death metal albums of all time. Jason Birchmeier of AllMusic wrote that one "cannot deny its influence", and MetalSucks likewise wrote that it is "impossible to ignore the importance of this release to the death metal genre." UK magazine Terrorizer rates this album as both Morbid Angel's and death metal's finest hour, describing it as "bludgeoning and raw but also technical, exacting and intimidatingly consistent".

Altars of Madness has appeared at the top of lists of the greatest death metal albums of all time by Decibel magazine and Terrorizer magazine. Loudwire named the album as the best death metal album of all time. In April 2006, the album was inducted into the Decibel Hall of Fame. The magazine wrote that the album "would turn death metal both upside down and inside out." Robban Becirovic of Close-Up credited the album for helping define death metal as a distinct style. He said: "Before [Altars,] there was no clear distinction between death, speed, or thrash among regular metalheads. It was just brutal metal. But Altars of Madness opened people's eyes, and made us realize something new was going on. Everybody bought that record. Everybody. And thrash was executed by it – the whole genre just disappeared." In 2022, Stephen Hill of Metal Hammer named the album as one of the best releases on Earache Records. He wrote: "Morbid Angel may not have invented death metal, but with their debut album, they raised the bar so high that the genre is still frantically straining to reach its majesty to this day."

The album's influence has been observed in the music of Emperor and Cradle of Filth.

== Track listing ==
All music is composed by Trey Azagthoth, except where noted.

No.	Title	Lyrics	Music	Length
1.	"Immortal Rites"	David Vincent		4:04
2.	"Suffocation"	Vincent	Azagthoth, Vincent	3:15
3.	"Visions from the Dark Side"	Vincent	Azagthoth, Vincent	4:10
4.	"Maze of Torment"	Vincent		4:25
5.	"Lord of All Fevers & Plague (Note: CD bonus track, did not appear on original cassette and vinyl versions)"	Azagthoth		3:26
6.	"Chapel of Ghouls"	Azagthoth, Mike Browning		4:58
7.	"Bleed for the Devil"	Azagthoth		2:23
8.	"Damnation"	Vincent	Azagthoth, Vincent	4:10
9.	"Blasphemy"	Azagthoth		3:31
10.	"Evil Spells"	Azagthoth		4:13

== Personnel ==
=== Morbid Angel ===
- David Vincent – bass, vocals
- Trey Azagthoth – guitars
- Richard Brunelle – guitars
- Pete Sandoval – drums

=== Production ===
- Dig – executive production
- Morbid Angel – arrangement, production
- Tom Morris – engineering, mixing
