= Karmin discography =

This is the discography of American pop duo Karmin.

== Studio albums ==
Title	Details	Peak chart positions				Sales
Title	Details	US	US Heat	US Indie	AUS	Sales
Karmin Covers, Vol. 1	Released: May 24, 2011; Label: Karmin Music / The Complex Music Group; Format: Digital download	—	27	—	—	
Pulses	Released: March 25, 2014; Label: Epic; Format: CD, digital download	32	—	—	46	US: 27,000
Leo Rising	Released: September 9, 2016; Label: Karmin Music, Inc./RED Associated Labels; Format: CD, digital download	—	—	27	—	
"—" denotes a recording that failed to chart, was ineligible for the chart, or was not released.

== Extended plays ==
Title	Details	Peak chart positions		
Title	Details	US	CAN	UK
Inside Out	Released: May 10, 2010; Label: Karmin Music; Format: CD, digital download	—	—	—
The Winslow Sessions	Released: February 16, 2011; Label: Karmin Music; Format: Digital download	—	—	—
Hello	Released: May 4, 2012; Label: Epic; Format: CD, digital download	18	33	136
"—" denotes a recording that failed to chart, was ineligible for the chart, or was not released.

== Singles ==
Title	Year	Peak chart positions										Certifications (sales thresholds)	Album
Title	Year	US	US Dance	US Pop	AUS	BEL	CAN	IRL	JPN	NZ	UK	Certifications (sales thresholds)	Album
"Take It Away"	2011	—	—	—	—	—	—	—	—	—	—		The Winslow Sessions
"Crash Your Party"	2011	—	—	36	—	—	—	—	88	—	—		—N/a
"Look at Me Now"	2011	—	—	—	—	—	—	—	—	—	—		Karmin Covers, Vol. 1
"Brokenhearted"	2012	16	1	10	9	61	19	40	—	5	6	RIAA: Platinum; ARIA: 2× Platinum; MC: Platinum; RMNZ: Platinum; BPI: Silver; IFPI Den: Gold	Hello
"Hello"	2012	62	1	16	72	—	72	—	—	21	—		Hello
"Acapella"	2013	72	—	34	4	30	63	—	—	9	—	RIAA: Gold; ARIA: 3× Platinum; MC: Gold; RMNZ: Gold	Pulses
"I Want It All"	2014	—	—	39	—	—	—	—	—	—	—		Pulses
"Sugar"	2014	—	—	—	—	—	—	—	—	—	—		Leo Rising
"Yesterday"	2014	—	—	—	—	—	—	—	—	—	—		—N/a
"Along the Road"	2015	—	—	—	—	—	—	—	—	—	—		Leo Rising
"Didn't Know You"	2015	—	—	—	—	—	—	—	—	—	—		Leo Rising
"Come with Me (Pure Imagination)"	2016	—	—	—	—	—	—	—	—	—	—		Leo Rising
"Blame It on My Heart"	2016	—	—	—	—	—	—	—	—	—			Leo Rising
"—" denotes a recording that did not chart or was not released in that territory.

== As featured artist ==
Song	Year	Peak chart positions	Album
Song	Year	US Dance Digital	Album
"Bang It Out" (Breathe Carolina featuring Karmin)	2014	44	Savages
"Young in Love" (Borgeous featuring Karmin)	2016	—	13
"—" denotes a recording that did not chart or was not released in that territory.

== Promotional singles ==
Title	Year	Album
"Hold It Against Me"	2011	Karmin Covers, Vol. 1
"Born This Way"	2011	Karmin Covers, Vol. 1
"Forget You"	2011	Karmin Covers, Vol. 1
"I Need a Doctor"	2011	Karmin Covers, Vol. 1
"Less Than Perfect"	2011	Karmin Covers, Vol. 1
"Just a Kiss"	2011	Karmin Covers, Vol. 1
"Super Bass" (featuring Questlove & Owen Biddle)	2011	—N/a
"I Told You So"	2012	Hello
"Sleigh Ride"	2012	—N/a
"Pulses"	2014	Pulses
"Summer Nights"	2014	Non-album singles
"No Flex Zone (Remix)" (with Watsky)	2014	Non-album singles
"Maybelline"	2015	Non-album singles
"That Old Black Magic (Remix)"	2015	Non-album singles
"Bitch Better Have My Money"	2015	Non-album singles
"Can't Feel My Face"	2015	Non-album singles
"What Do You Mean?"	2015	Non-album singles
"Easy Money"	2015	Leo Rising
"Baby It's Cold Outside"	2015	non-album singles
"Panda (Remix)"	2016	non-album singles
"Riverbend"	2016	non-album singles
"All I Want For Christmas Is You"	2016	non-album singles

== Other appearances ==
Title	Year	Other artist(s)	Album
"Let's Go"	2013	Jonas Brothers	Live
"Song for You"	2013	Big Time Rush	24/Seven
"Big Yellow Taxi"	2014	—N/a	Home
"Flex"	2016	Futuristic	As Seen on the Internet
"Already Miss You"	2016	Lucas Vidal	Realive
"Big Girls Don't Cry	2017	—N/a	Dirty Dancing
