= Qveen Herby =

American rapper and singer

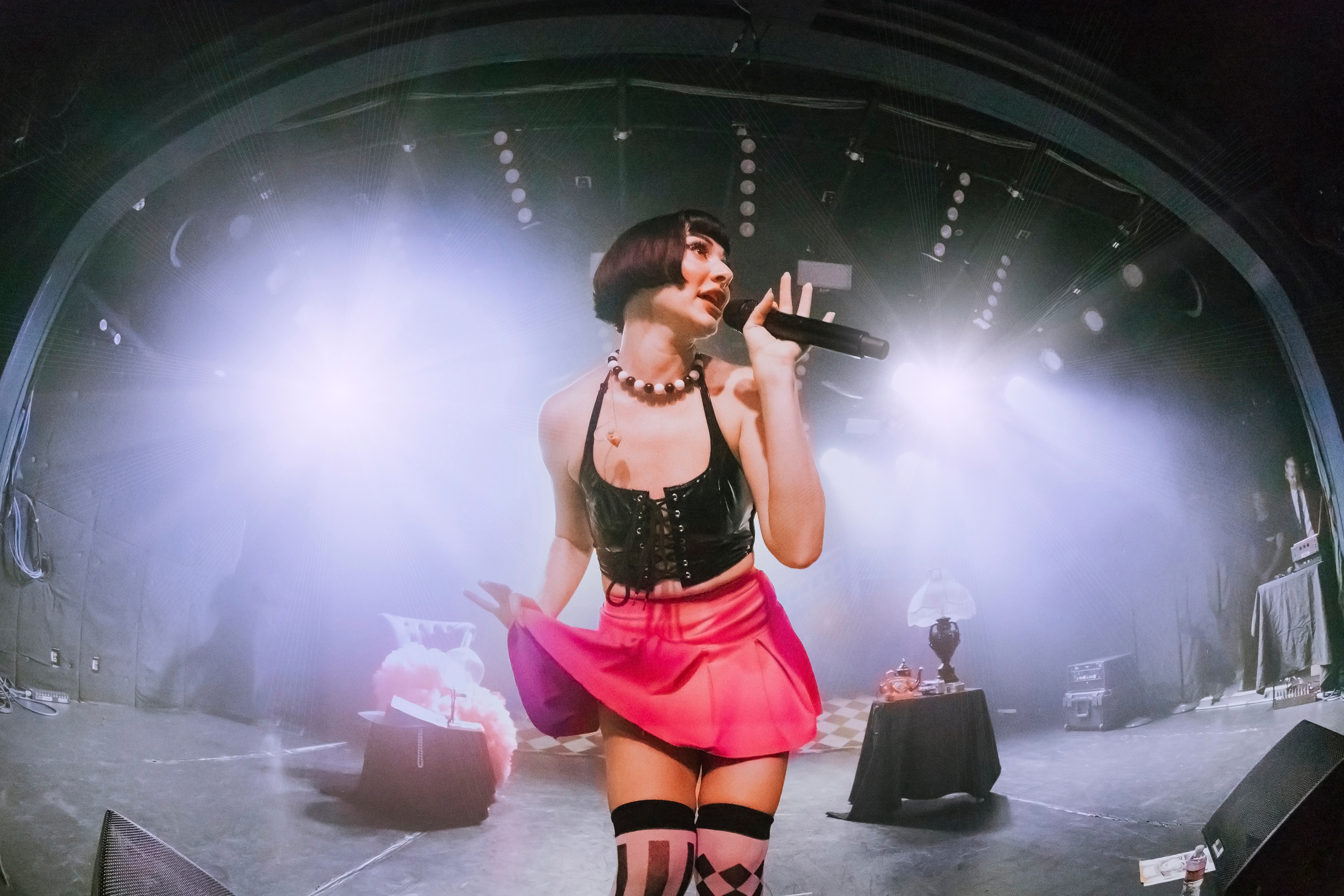
- Qveen Herby performing in 2023
- Born: Amy Renee Heidemann; April 29, 1986 (age 40); Seward, Nebraska, U.S.
- Other names: Amy Renee Heidemann; Amy Heidemann; Amy Renee Heidemann Noonan; Amy Renee Noonan; Amy Noonan; Qveen Herby
- Education: Berklee College of Music
- Occupations: Rapper; singer; songwriter; entrepreneur
- Years active: 2010–present
- Organization: Qveen Studio Cosmetics
- Spouse: Nick Noonan (m. 2016)
- Musical career
- Origin: Boston, Massachusetts, U.S.
- Genres: Hip-hop; R&B; soul; pop-rap; trap
- Instruments: Vocals; guitar; piano
- Label: Checkbook
- Website: qveenherby.com

Amy Renee Heidemann Noonan (born April 29, 1986), better known professionally as Qveen Herby, is an American rapper, singer, songwriter, and entrepreneur. Born and raised in Seward, Nebraska, she first gained fame as part of the music duo Karmin, with which she released two studio albums. Following the duo's hiatus in 2017, she began the solo project, Qveen Herby, which incorporated R&B and hip-hop influences. She released her first solo extended play, EP 1 on June 2, 2017. She released her debut album, A Woman, on May 21, 2021.

After the release of EP 1 and EP 2, Herby began to release a series of extended plays. EP 3 and EP 4 were released in 2018; with EP 5, EP 6, and EP 7 being out in 2019. In 2020, Herby revealed that EP 8 and EP 9 were considered to be the last EPs from her extended play era. On Halloween 2021, Qveen Herby released a Halloween-themed EP called Halloqveen. The following April, she revealed another EP called Mad Qveen, and another named The Muse the following February.

== Career ==
=== 2010–2016: Karmin ===
Heidemann began her musical career as a member of pop duo Karmin, with now-husband Nick Noonan, releasing cover songs on YouTube. The duo signed with Epic Records and released their debut EP, Hello, on May 7, 2012, to poor reviews from critics; despite this, the EP was a commercial success supplemented by two hit singles: "Brokenhearted" peaked at number 16 on Billboard Hot 100 charts, and peaked within the top ten of the charts in Australia, New Zealand, and the United Kingdom, while "Hello" peaked at number one on the Billboard Hot Dance Club Songs charts in the United States.

The duo followed Hello up by their debut full-length studio album, Pulses (2014), which saw less commercial success, and was supplemented by the single "Acapella". "Acapella" reached the top ten in Australia and New Zealand. Following the conclusion of promotion for Pulses, Karmin left Epic Records and began releasing music independently. They released a slew of singles from 2014 to 2016 in anticipation of a second studio album. These included "Sugar", "Yesterday", "Along the Road", "Didn't Know You", and "Come with Me (Pure Imagination)". In 2016, Karmin released the Sugar EP in collaboration with Wild Culture. It features three remixes of "Sugar" and a remix of Riley Pearce's single "Brave". The duo released their second studio album, Leo Rising, on September 9, 2016.

=== 2017–2020: Long Live the Qveen ===
In 2017, all of Karmin's social media was rebranded to Qveen Herby with a small preview stating "Karmin Is Dead, Long Live the Qveen." Heidemann formally announced her solo career as well as her debut extended play, EP 1. Although her husband, Nick Noonan, was still involved in the project, Heidemann noted that they felt that they could not release the extended play as Karmin as "There was that much happening sonically." Heidemann picked her stage name by combining "Qveen" a nickname given to her in college alongside "Herby" the mascot of the Nebraska Cornhuskers, later realizing that "Herby" means "Warrior".

The music video for her first single "Busta Rhymes" was released on June 1, 2017, followed by the release of EP 1 a day later. The EP experienced fair success, peaking at No. 37 on the US Billboard Independent Albums Chart and No. 13 on the US Heatseekers Albums Chart.

After the release of EP 1, Herby released her second extended play, EP 2, on December 1, 2017. Around the release of EP 2, Herby and DJ Audrey Napoleon launched their cosmetic business Qveen Studios with the makeup line inspired by songs on Qveen Herby's discography.

Following the release of EP 1 and EP 2, Herby began releasing a series of extended plays, starting with EP 3 and EP 4 released in 2018. EP 5, EP 6, and EP 7 were released in 2019. She has also released a live EP and a single album, The Vignettes and Tiny Piano.

Lastly, EP 8 and EP 9 came out in 2020. Three of the EPs charted within Billboard charts in the US. Throughout 2020, Qveen Herby revealed that EP 9 was considered to be the last EP. After the end of her EP era (in 2020), she began releasing droplets such as "Alright" and "The Show", until the year was over.

=== 2021–present: A Woman ===
On April 16, 2021, Qveen Herby released "Juice" as the lead single for her debut album. Herby announced the album's title, A Woman, and an initial release date of April 27, 2021. Herby officially released the album on May 21, 2021, along with a music video for the second single, "Naughty Girl". In early October, Qveen Herby revealed that a Halloween-themed EP was in works with a celebration.

On October 15, 2021, Qveen Herby released the Halloween-themed EP Halloqveen. Later on, she revealed a date for her EP's release party which took place in Downtown Los Angeles on October 23.

In March 2022, Qveen Herby announced on Instagram a new EP titled MAD QVEEN, which was released on April 1 through her own record label Checkbook Records. The EP included 7 tracks such as "Rabbit Hole" and "Cruella".

On October 11, 2022, Qveen Herby released her first double single "5D", which includes her latest singles, "5D" and "DRESS CODE ".

On February 14, 2023, Qveen Herby released her twelfth EP THE MUSE via Checkbook Records which she teased on TikTok and Instagram. She officially announced the release on her House of Herby podcast on S2 E1, January 26, 2023. The tracklist was released on Instagram January 31, 2023, letting fans know the double single "5D" and "DRESS CODE" was the first official single. She held a release party at her residence on February 13 to celebrate the midnight release.

On June 11, 2024, Qveen Herby announced on Instagram that new music was on its way. On June 14th, Qveen Herby released the album artwork for her newest EP album titled The Alchemist. The project was released on June 21 and featured seven songs along with all the lyric videos being posted on YouTube. With the release of the album, Qveen Herby also announced The Alchemist Tour, her first US and Canadian tour in support of her fourteenth EP project "The Alchemist". The tour started in Los Angeles, California, on October 31st and concluded on November 23rd, in Miami, Florida.

Qveen Herby's second studio album, Isle of Qveen, was released in February 2026. She promoted the album with the Isle of Qveen Tour from May 2026 to August 2026, joined by American rapper and songwriter Thot Squad.

== Discography ==
Qveen Herby discography
- Studio albums: 2
- EPs: 16
- Compilation albums: 1
- Singles: 37
- Featured singles: 1
- Promotional singles: 6

=== Studio albums ===
Title	Details
A Woman	Release: May 21, 2021; Format: CD, Vinyl, digital download, streaming; Label: Checkbook

=== Compilation album ===
Title	Details
Qveen Essentials	Released: October 30, 2020; Label: Checkbook; Format: Vinyl

=== Extended plays ===
Title	Details	Peak chart positions		
Title	Details	US Indie	US Heat.	US R&B/HH
EP 1	Released: June 2, 2017; Format: digital download & streaming; Label: Checkbook	37	13	31
EP 2	Released: December 1, 2017; Format: digital download & streaming; Label: Checkbook	—	—	—
EP 3	Released: June 8, 2018; Format: digital download & streaming; Label: Checkbook	—	—	—
EP 4	Release: November 2, 2018; Format: digital download & streaming; Label: Checkbook	—	—	—
EP 5	Release: February 8, 2019; Format: digital download & streaming; Label: Checkbook	—	—	36
EP 6	Release: May 3, 2019; Format: digital download & streaming; Label: Checkbook	—	—	39
The Vignettes	Release: September 4, 2019; Format: digital download & streaming; Label: Checkbook	—	—	—
EP 7	Release: November 5, 2019; Format: digital download & streaming; Label: Checkbook	—	—	—
Tiny Piano	Release: March 4, 2020; Format: digital download & streaming; Label: Checkbook	—	—	—
EP 8	Release: May 26, 2020; Format: digital download & streaming; Label: Checkbook	—	—	—
EP 9	Release: September 29, 2020; Format: digital download & streaming; Label: Checkbook	—	—	—
Halloqveen	Release: October 15, 2021; Format: CD, digital download, streaming; Label: Checkbook	-	-	-
Mad Qveen	Release: April 1, 2022; Format: Digital download, streaming; Label: Checkbook	-	-	-
The Muse	Release: February 14, 2023; Format: Digital download, streaming; Label: Checkbook	-	-	-
Housewife	Release: August 29, 2023; Format: Digital download, streaming; Label: Checkbook	-	-	-
The Alchemist	Release: June 21, 2024; Format: Digital download, streaming; Label: Checkbook	-	-	-
Isle of Qveen	Release: February 13, 2026; Format: Digital download, streaming; Label: Checkbook			
"—" denotes a recording that failed to chart, was ineligible for the chart, or was not released.

=== Singles ===
==== As lead artist ====
Title	Year	Album
"Busta Rhymes"	2017	EP 1
"Love Myself"	2017	EP 2
"Wifey"	2017	EP 2
"Holiday"	2017	EP 2
"That Bih"	2018	EP 3
"Sade in the 90s"	2018	EP 3
"Beautiful"	2018	EP 3
"All These Hoes"	2018	EP 3
"Alone"	2018	EP 4
"BDE"	2019	EP 5
"Mozart" (featuring Blimes and Gifted Gab)	2019	EP 6
"S.O.S."	2019	The Vignettes
"Strange Dreams"	2019	The Vignettes
"Mademoiselle"	2019	The Vignettes
"Cheap Talk"	2019	EP 7
"Vitamins"	2019	EP 7
"Check"	2020	EP 8
"Sugar Daddy"	2020	EP 8
"Self Aware" (featuring Durand Bernarr)	2020	EP 8
"Mission"	2020	EP 9
"Chakras"	2020	EP 9
"Sleepwalker"	2020	EP 9
"Farewell"	2020	EP 9
"Pre Roll"	2020	EP 9
"Who Is She"	2020	Non-album singles
"Alright"	2020	Non-album singles
"Elevator" (featuring Yoitscrash)	2020	Non-album singles
"The Show"	2020	Non-album singles
"Juice"	2021	A Woman
"Naughty Girl"	2021	A Woman
"5D"	2022	The Muse
"Dress Code"	2022	The Muse
"Thank Goddess"	2023	The Muse
"Chucky Cheese"	2023	The Muse
"Barbie Girl"	2023	Non-album single
"RIP"	2024	Non-album single
"Frankenstein" (featuring Tech N9ne)	2024	Non-album single
"Hacky Sack"	2025	Isle of Qveen
"Medicine Woman"	2025	Isle of Qveen
"Sensational"	2025	Isle of Qveen
"High Priestess"	2025	Isle of Qveen
"Thank Me" (with Able Heart)	2026	
"Perfect Timing" (with Able Heart)	2026	

==== As featured artist ====
Song	Year	Album
"Kill My Heart" (Vincint featuring Parson James and Qveen Herby)	2021	There Will Be Tears

=== Promotional singles ===
Title	Year	Album
"Rolex" (Remix)	2017	Non-album promotional singles
"Everybody Mad" (Remix)	2017	Non-album promotional singles
"No Limit" (Remix)	2018	Non-album promotional singles
"LLC" (Remix)	2018	Non-album promotional singles
"WAP" (Remix)	2020	Non-album promotional singles
"Silver Bells"	2020	Non-album promotional singles

=== Other appearances ===
Title	Year	Album
"Bad Bitches"	2020	Chick Fight – Round One

=== Music videos ===
Title	Year	Album	Director(s)	Remarks
"Busta Rhymes"	2017	EP 1	Benjamin Farren; Brandon Douglas	
"Rolex (Remix)"	2017	—N/a		Music videos were deleted.
"Love Myself"	2017	EP 2	Benjamin Farren	Music videos were deleted.
"Wifey"	2017	EP 2	Benjamin Farren	
"Everybody Mad (Remix)"	2017	—N/a		Music videos were deleted.
"Holiday"	2017	EP 2	Benjamin Farren	Music videos were deleted.
"No Limit (Remix)"	2018	—N/a		Music videos were deleted.
"THAT BIH"	2018	EP 3	Benjamin Farren	
"SADE IN THE 90s"	2018	EP 3	Nick Noonan	
"ALL THESE HOES"	2018	EP 3	Nick Noonan	
"LLC (Remix)"	2018	—N/a		Music video was deleted.
"Alone"	2018	EP 4	Eyes	
"BDE"	2019	EP 5	Luckie	
"Mozart" (ft. Blimes & Gifted Gab)	2019	EP 6	Luckie	
"S.O.S"	2019	The Vignettes	Nick Noonan	
"Strange Dreams"	2019	The Vignettes	Nick Noonan	
"Mademoiselle"	2019	The Vignettes	Nick Noonan	
"Cheap Talk"	2019	EP 7	Nick Noonan	
"Vitamins"	2019	EP 7	Nick Noonan	
"Check"	2020	EP 8	Nick Noonan	
"Sugar Daddy"	2020	EP 8	Nick Noonan	
"Self Aware" (ft. Durand Bernarr)	2020	EP 8	Nick Noonan	
"WAP"	2020	Non-album singles	Nick Noonan	
"Mission"	2020	EP 9	Nick Noonan	
"Chakras"	2020	EP 9	Nick Noonan	
"Sleepwalker"	2020	EP 9	Nick Noonan	
"Farewell"	2020	EP 9	Nick Noonan	
"Pre Roll"	2020	EP 9	Nick Noonan	
"Who Is She"	2020	Non-album singles	Nick Noonan	
"Alright"	2020	Non-album singles	Nick Noonan	
"Elevator" (ft. Yoitscrash)	2020	Non-album singles	Nick Noonan	
"The Show"	2020	Non-album singles	Nick Noonan	
"Silver Bells"	2020	Non-album singles	Nick Noonan	
"Juice"	2021	A Woman	Nick Noonan	
"Naughty Girl"	2021	A Woman	Nick Noonan	
"5D"	2022	THE MUSE	Nick Noonan	
"Thank Goddess"	2023	THE MUSE	Nick Noonan	
"Chucky Cheese"	2023	THE MUSE	Nick Noonan	
"Hacky Sack"	2025	Isle of Qveen	Nick Noonan	
"Medicine Woman"	2025	Isle of Qveen	Nick Noonan	
"The Fool" (feat. Thot Squad)	2026	Isle of Qveen	Nick Noonan	

=== Film soundtracks ===
Year	Film	Language	Song	Music	Lyrics	Co-artist(s)	Ref.
2026	Dhurandhar: The Revenge	Hindi	"Hum Pyaar Karne Wale"	Shashwat Sachdev, Anand–Milind	Qveen Herby, Sameer Anjaan	Anuradha Paudwal, Udit Narayan	

== Accolades ==
Year	Organization	Award	Result	Ref.
2016	She Rocks Awards	Mad Skills Award	Won	

== Filmography ==
=== Film ===
Title	Year	Role	Ref.
Rio 2	2014	Sloth	

=== Music video ===
Title	Year	Performer(s)	Description	Ref.
"PBC"	2022	Flo Milli	Qveen Herby appears to be next to Flo Milli in the skit.	
