= Jon Jon Traxx =

American singer, songwriter, producer, multi-instrumentalist

John Webb Jr.
- Born: St. Louis, Missouri, United States
- Other names: Jon Jon Traxx, John John Webb, Jonathan Webb
- Musical career
- Genres: R&B; hip hop; pop; gospel
- Occupations: Singer; songwriter; producer; multi-instrumentalist

Jon Jon Traxx is a producer, songwriter, bassist, and drummer best known for co-writing/co-producing Beyoncé's "Deja Vu", Karmin promotional single "I Told You So", and moderate R&B hits "Bravo" (Ledisi) and "Turn The Page" (Bobby V).

== Early life ==
Webb began as a church drummer, performing in the St. Louis area as a youth. Both of his parents were musicians, and Webb used to spend hours in the studio watching his father record. By 16 he had switched to the bass guitar, and moved to Houston. Meshell Ndegeocello heard him in a Houston club one night and hired him for a two-year stint as her touring bassist.

== Career ==
By 2005, Webb was being mentored by notable producer Rodney Jerkins, which resulted in various instrumental credits across albums from Tamia, American Idol contestant Paris Bennett, and Bobby V. Webb also appeared twice on Been a While, the 2005 debut solo album of future Danity Kane member Dawn Richard.

One evening while driving to a 7-Eleven before a recording session, Michael Jackson’s “Don't Stop 'Til You Get Enough” came on the radio, and having previously worked with Jackson, Jerkins, alongside mentee Webb "came up with the concept of doing an old-school track,... A throwback with real bass and horns..." to give Beyoncé something of that caliber. Later, in Jerkins' New Jersey studio alongside several songwriters, Jerkins and Webb cut the demo in the span of an hour and presented it to Beyoncé, who fell in love with the record and cut it immediately. The completed song ("Deja Vu") would ultimately win the "Gentlemen's battle" between producers Jerkins, Sean Garrett, Swizz Beatz, The Neptunes, and Rich Harrison at Sony Music Studios to secure the lead single for Beyonce's sophomore album B'Day, and peaked in the top 10 in various markets, resulting in three Grammy nominations and earning Webb his first co-producer credit and Grammy nomination.

In 2010, Webb would begin a writing and producing partnership with fellow songwriter-producer Claude Kelly, placing songs on albums from Ledisi, Karmin, Boys Like Girls, Jessie J, and Eve.

In 2018, Webb executive-produced debut project Running To The Sun for Wondaland Arts Society group St. Beauty, producing five out of the ten tracks. In an interview with UK publication I-D on the project, St. Beauty stated, "Our producer, Jon Jon Traxx, made us feel very comfortable in the studio so we were able to open up, try new things, explore, and figure out what our sound was. He challenged us. Even the times when we thought that our ideas were great and that a song was done, he’d be like, 'no, you guys could do better.' Having someone challenge us was great feedback."

In 2019, Webb reached the top 10 on the Billboard Top Gospel Producers Chart for his contributions to gospel singer Casey J's sophomore album The Gathering. In 2023, Webb contributed multiple songs to gospel artist Dante Bowe's eponymous third studio album and upcoming album Press Play, including lead single "Hide Me" which reached the Billboard Gospel Airplay chart. In 2024, he produced "Sugarwater & Lime" for Elijah Blake's eponymous album.

== Legal disputes ==
In 2016, Webb sued rapper Iggy Azalea for $1.5 Million, after reportedly signing a recording contract with her in 2009 and not being compensated. In the contract with the then-unsigned artist, Webb agreed to coordinate meetings with major labels, coordinate show and venue bookings, and recruit a stylist. When Azalea signed with Def Jam Recordings in 2013, the two amicably agreed to part ways, but one of the conditions to end the contract required that Webb would receive compensation, which did not occur.

== Discography ==
=== Executive-produced/co-written projects ===
Albums with ~ 50% Jon Jon Traxx production/songwriting credits or more
Album	Artist	Year	Label
Running To The Sun	St. Beauty	2018	Wondaland Arts Society
Dante Bowe	Dante Bowe	2023	TRUE Music

=== Selected songwriting, instrumental and production credits ===
Title	Year	Artist	Album
"Pimpin' All Over the World" (Featuring Bobby V)	2004	Ludacris	The Red Light District
"Can't Get Enough"	2005	Tamia	Between Friends
"Déjà Vu"	2006	Beyoncé	B'Day
"We Ride (I See the Future)" (Instrumental Version)	2006	Mary J. Blige	Reflections (A Retrospective)
"Turn the Page"	2007	Bobby V	Special Occasion
"All Hail The Princess" (Intro)	2007	Paris Bennett	Princess P
"Ordinary Love"	2007	Paris Bennett	Princess P
"I'm So Hot"	2007	Paris Bennett	Princess P
"Bravo"	2011	Ledisi	Pieces of Me
"Shine"	2011	Ledisi	Pieces of Me
"Mr. Invisible"	2011	Chris Walker	Zone
"Purity"	2011	Chris Walker	Zone
"Walking on the Moon"	2012	Karmin	Hello
"Brokenhearted" (Demo)	2012	Karmin	Hello
"I Told You So"	2012	Karmin	Hello
"I'm Just Sayin'"	2012	Karmin	Hello
"Stuck In The Middle"	2012	Boys Like Girls	Crazy World
"Until I Pass Out"	2012	Uncle Reece	Bold
"Conquer The World" (Featuring Brandy)	2013	Jessie J	Alive
"Misconception Pt 2" (Featuring W.L.A.K.)	2013	Lecrae	Church Clothes 2
"Make It Out This Town" (Featuring Gabe Saporta)	2013	Eve	Lip Lock
"All Night" (Featuring Claude Kelly & Propain)	2013	Eve	Lip Lock
"Pulses"	2014	Karmin	Pulses
"Drifter"	2014	Karmin	Pulses
"Do Not Disturb" (Featuring Chris Brown)	2014	Teyana Taylor	VII
"On Demand" (Featuring Wale & August Alsina)	2014	Keyshia Cole	Point of No Return
"Better"	2014	Jessica Reedy	Transparent
"That Good Good"	2014	Ledisi	The Truth
"Anything"	2014	Ledisi	The Truth
"The Truth"	2014	Ledisi	The Truth
"Quick Fix"	2014	Ledisi	The Truth
"Safari" (Featuring Janelle Monáe, St. Beauty & Nana Kwabena)	2017	Jidenna	The Chief
"Slow Burn"	2017	Daley	The Spectrum
"Take A Byte"	2018	Janelle Monáe	Dirty Computer
"Americans"	2018	Janelle Monáe	Dirty Computer
"Sugarwater & Lime"	2024	Elijah Blake	Elijah.
"Weigh Me Down"	2025	Keri Hilson	We Need to Talk: Love
"Ms. Goody Two Shoes"	2026	Alex Isley	When the City Sleeps

== Awards and nominations ==
Year	Ceremony	Award	Result	Ref
2007	49th Annual Grammy Awards	Best R&B Song (Déjà Vu)	Nominated	
