= EP 1 (Qveen Herby EP) =

EP by Qveen Herby
- Released: June 2, 2017
- Genre: Hip-hop; R&B; soul
- Length: 16:23
- Label: Checkbook
- Producer: Nick Noonan; Unkle Steve

Qveen Herby chronology
EP 1 (2017)	EP 2 (2017)

Singles from EP 1
- 1. "Busta Rhymes" Released: June 2, 2017

EP 1 is the debut extended play by American rapper and singer Qveen Herby, released by Checkbook Records on June 2, 2017. The EP received positive reviews from critics, who praised Herby's rebranding as an artist and the exploration of R&B and hip-hop music. The EP also gained moderate chart success, peaking at number 37 on the Billboard Independent Albums Chart and number 13 on the US Heatseekers Albums chart.

== Background ==
Amy Renee Heidemann began her musical career as a member of pop duo Karmin, with now-husband Nick Noonan. The duo gained fame from their cover songs uploaded to their YouTube account, which included "Look at Me Now", "Super Bass," and "Party Rock Anthem". The duo later announced in 2012 that they had signed to Epic Records. The group released their debut EP, Hello, on May 7, 2012, and Pulses in 2014 to mixed reviews from critics. Heidemann and Noonan also released Leo Rising independently on September 9, 2016.

In the spring of 2017, all of Karmin's social media was rebranded to Qveen Herby with a short preview post stating, "Karmin Is Dead, Long Live the Qveen." Noonan formally announced her solo career as well as her debut extended play, EP 1.

== Promotion ==
A music video for the single "Busta Rhymes" was released one day prior to the EP's release.

== Critical reception ==
Adrian Glover of Salute Magazine rated the album 4.7 out of 5, praising Herby's "real vocal talent that has aerodynamic chops as a singer and as a rapper." Glover also called Herby "a contender for the queen’s crown."

Danielle Holian of Pure M magazine described "Busta Rhymes", the EP's first single, as "the chill beat [that] highlights her energy free flowing the storyline. The lyrical speed as each word spills graciously from the songstress’ mouth opens the extended-play with a lot to offer." Holian concluded, "EP 1, is a powerful debut for Qveen Herby. The awe-inspiring choruses, memorable hip-hop and R&B components outshine her previous work letting this new project stand alone and fresh."

== Track listing ==
All tracks are written by Qveen Herby, Nick Noonan, and Unkle Steve

No.	Title	Length
1.	"Gucci"	3:28
2.	"Busta Rhymes"	3:07
3.	"Zombie"	3:09
4.	"Wild"	3:06
5.	"Till We Get By"	3:33
Total length:		16:23

== Charts ==
Chart (2017)	Peak position
US Heatseekers Albums	13
US Independent Albums	37
US Top R&B/Hip-Hop Albums	31

== Release history ==
release dates and formats for EP 1
Region	Date	Format(s)	Label	Ref.
Various	June 2, 2017	streaming; digital download	Checkbook	
