= A Woman (Qveen Herby album) =

Studio album by Qveen Herby
- Released: May 21, 2021
- Recorded: October 2020 – February 2021
- Genre: R&B; hip-hop; soul
- Length: 40:16
- Label: Checkbook Records
- Producer: Pompano Puff; Jedi Nick

Qveen Herby chronology
EP 9 (2020)	A Woman (2021)	HALLOQVEEN (2021)

Singles from A Woman
- 1. "Juice" Released: April 13, 2021; 2. "Naughty Girl" Released: May 21, 2021

A Woman is the debut studio album of American rapper and singer Qveen Herby, which was released on May 21, 2021, by Checkbook Records.

== Background ==
After finishing her forty-five-track EP phase that ran for three years since 2017 beginning with EP 1 and ending with EP 9 in 2020, Herby started working on her first full studio album around October 2020. One of Herby's songs, Gucci Vision, was featured in the season 10 premiere of VH1's hit reality show Love & Hip Hop: Atlanta.

== Writing and recording ==
The writing and recording process of the album was completed by the end of February 2021, her and her team moved on to the visual part of the album soon after. She finally announced the album title and release date on April 27, 2021.

== Release ==
=== Singles ===
"Juice" was released on April 13, 2021, as the album's lead single and a music video was released on April 16, 2021.

"Naughty Girl" was announced with the album's pre-order on April 27, 2021. The song was released as the second single along with the album on May 21, 2021, and with a music video.

== Track listing ==
All tracks are written by Qveen Herby, Nick Noonan and Steve Tirogene, and produced by the latter two, except where noted.

A Woman track listing
No.	Title	Writer(s)	Length
1.	"Balenciaga Dreams"		3:02
2.	"Faster"		2:53
3.	"A Woman"		3:21
4.	"Naughty Girl"		3:09
5.	"Juice"	Pompano Puff; Nick Noonan	3:14
6.	"Black Sheep"		3:38
7.	"Good Morning"		5:11
8.	"Mother Teresa"		3:28
9.	"Gucci Vision"	Patrick John Kesack	2:50
10.	"Masterpiece"		2:59
11.	"Celine Dion"		2:55
12.	"Underdog"		3:30
Total length:			40:16

Vinyl edition (bonus tracks)
No.	Title	Length
13.	"Sugar Daddy"	3:23
Total length:		43:39

== Personnel ==
Credits adapted from the album's liner notes of A Woman.

=== Musicians ===
- Qveen Herby – vocals, background vocals, rap, writer (all tracks)
- Pompano Puff – record producer, co-writer (track 5)
- Nick Noonan – record producer, co-writer (track 5)
- Patrick John Kesack – co-writer (track 9)

== Release history ==
release dates and formats for A Woman
Region	Date	Format(s)	Label	Ref.
Various	May 21, 2021	CD; streaming; digital download	Checkbook	
Various	January 26, 2022	vinyl	Checkbook	
