= EP 2 (Qveen Herby EP) =

EP by Qveen Herby
- Released: December 1, 2017
- Genre: Hip-hop; R&B
- Length: 16:31
- Label: Checkbook
- Producer: Nick Noonan; Unkle Steve

Qveen Herby chronology
EP 1 (2017)	EP 2 (2017)	EP 3 (2018)

Singles from EP 2
- 1. "Love Myself" Released: September 8, 2017; 2. "Wifey" Released: October 13, 2017; 3. "Holiday" Released: December 1, 2017

EP 2 is the second extended play by American rapper and singer Qveen Herby, released by Checkbook Records on December 1, 2017. It serves as the follow-up to her first extended play, EP 1 (2017), which garnered positive reviews.

== Background ==
Qveen Herby released her debut EP, EP 1 on June 2, 2017, supported by the single "Busta Rhymes" as well as its music video. Following the conclusion of the EP's promotion, Herby began work on EP 2, working with Nick Noonan and Steve Tirogene for the album's production. The album contains guest appearances from American singers and rappers, Monogem and Maliibu Miitch. She additionally launched her cosmetics business Qveen Studios with DJ Audrey Napoleon, with the makeup line inspired by songs on the EP. The second single of the EP, Wifey, was also used in American crime drama and thriller series, Ozark, season 2 episode 9.

== Singles ==
EP 2 has been supported by the release of three singles. "Love Myself" was released as the lead single from the EP on September 8, 2017. It was accompanied by a music video the same day, but later on deleted. The second single, "Wifey", was released on October 13, 2017 with a music video. "Holiday" received a music video on November 30, 2017, directed by Benjamin Farren. It was released as the third single on December 1, 2017. Later on, the music video was deleted for an unknown reason.

== Track listing ==
All tracks are written by Qveen Herby, Nick Noonan, and Unkle Steve, except for "Bank", which contains writing credits from Monogem and Maliibu Miitch.

No.	Title	Length
1.	"Wifey"	3:21
2.	"Bank" (feat. Monogem & Maliibu Miitch)	3:34
3.	"Holiday"	3:08
4.	"Well Dressed"	3:24
5.	"Love Myself"	3:04
Total length:		16:31

== Release history ==
release dates and formats for EP 2
Region	Date	Format(s)	Label	Ref.
Various	December 1, 2017	streaming; digital download	Checkbook	
