= List of Billboard number-one dance songs of 2012 =

Billboard magazine compiled the top-performing dance songs in the United States during 2012 on the Dance Club Songs, the Dance Singles Sales, and the Dance/Mix Show Airplay. Premiered in 1976, the Dance Club Songs ranked the most popular songs on dance club based on reports from a national sample of club DJs. The Dance Singles Sales chart was launched in 1985 to compile the best-selling dance singles based on retail sales across the United States. The Dance/Mix Show Airplay was first published in 2003, ranking the songs based on dance radio airplay and mix-show plays on top 40 radio and select rhythmic radio as measured by Mediabase.

== Charts history ==
Chart history
Issue date	Dance Club Songs		Dance Singles Sales		Dance/Mix Show Airplay		Ref.
Issue date	Song	Artist(s)	Song	Artist(s)	Song	Artist(s)	Ref.
January 7	"The One That Got Away"	Katy Perry	"Video Games"	Lana Del Rey	"We Found Love"	Rihanna featuring Calvin Harris	
January 14	"Party People (Ignite the World)"	Erika Jayne	"Video Games"	Lana Del Rey	"We Found Love"	Rihanna featuring Calvin Harris	
January 21	"Marry the Night"	Lady Gaga	"Video Games"	Lana Del Rey	"We Found Love"	Rihanna featuring Calvin Harris	
January 28	"If It Wasn't for Love"	Deborah Cox	"Levels"	Avicii	"We Found Love"	Rihanna featuring Calvin Harris	
February 4	"Hotel Nacional"	Gloria Estefan	"Levels"	Avicii	"We Found Love"	Rihanna featuring Calvin Harris	
February 11	"Turn Me On"	David Guetta featuring Nicki Minaj	"Sun Burns Down"	Jin Akanishi	"We Found Love"	Rihanna featuring Calvin Harris	
February 18	"You da One"	Rihanna	"Levels"	Avicii	"We Found Love"	Rihanna featuring Calvin Harris	
February 25	"Dance On"	Blush	"Levels"	Avicii	"Turn Me On"	David Guetta featuring Nicki Minaj	
March 3	"Stronger (What Doesn't Kill You)"	Kelly Clarkson	"Kindred"	Burial	"Turn Me On"	David Guetta featuring Nicki Minaj	
March 10	"We Run the Night"	Havana Brown featuring Pitbull	"Kindred"	Burial	"Turn Me On"	David Guetta featuring Nicki Minaj	
March 17	"F U Betta"	Neon Hitch	"Feel So Close"	Calvin Harris	"Feel So Close"	Calvin Harris	
March 24	"International Love"	Pitbull featuring Chris Brown	"Feel So Close"	Calvin Harris	"Feel So Close"	Calvin Harris	
March 31	"Give Me All Your Luvin'"	Madonna featuring Nicki Minaj and M.I.A.	"Feel So Close"	Calvin Harris	"Feel So Close"	Calvin Harris	
April 7	"Domino"	Jessie J	"Feel So Close"	Calvin Harris	"Feel So Close"	Calvin Harris	
April 14	"Love on Top"	Beyoncé	"Feel So Close"	Calvin Harris	"Feel So Close"	Calvin Harris	
April 21	"Girl Gone Wild"	Madonna	"Feel So Close"	Calvin Harris	"Feel So Close"	Calvin Harris	
April 28	"Never Forget"	Dave Audé featuring Lena Katina	"Feel So Close"	Calvin Harris	"Glad You Came"	The Wanted	
May 5	"Wild One Two"	Jack Back featuring David Guetta, Nicky Romero and Sia	"Kick Out The Jams"	Afrika Bambaataa	"Feel So Close"	Calvin Harris	
May 12	"Part of Me"	Katy Perry	"Feel So Close"	Calvin Harris	"Feel So Close"	Calvin Harris	
May 19	"Somebody That I Used to Know"	Gotye featuring Kimbra	"Feel So Close"	Calvin Harris	"Somebody That I Used To Know"	Gotye Featuring Kimbra	
May 26	"Dance Again"	Jennifer Lopez featuring Pitbull	"Feel So Close"	Calvin Harris	"Somebody That I Used To Know"	Gotye Featuring Kimbra	
June 2	"Brokenhearted"	Karmin	"Feel So Close"	Calvin Harris	"Somebody That I Used To Know"	Gotye Featuring Kimbra	
June 9	"Where Have You Been"	Rihanna	"Call Me Maybe"	Carly Rae Jepsen	"Somebody That I Used To Know"	Gotye Featuring Kimbra	
June 16	"What Makes You Beautiful"	One Direction	"Call Me Maybe"	Carly Rae Jepsen	"Somebody That I Used To Know"	Gotye Featuring Kimbra	
June 23	"Calling (Lose My Mind)"	Sebastian Ingrosso and Alesso featuring Ryan Tedder	"Call Me Maybe"	Carly Rae Jepsen	"Where Have You Been"	Rihanna	
June 30	"I Heart You"	Toni Braxton	"Call Me Maybe"	Carly Rae Jepsen	"Somebody That I Used To Know"	Gotye featuring Kimbra	
July 7	"The Night Out"	Martin Solveig	"Call Me Maybe"	Carly Rae Jepsen	"Where Have You Been"	Rihanna	
July 14	"I Don't Like You"	Eva Simons	"The Veldt"	deadmau5 Featuring Chris James	"Let's Go"	Calvin Harris featuring Ne-Yo	
July 21	"Chasing the Sun"	The Wanted	"Call Me Maybe"	Carly Rae Jepsen	"Let's Go"	Calvin Harris featuring Ne-Yo	
July 28	"How We Do (Party)"	Rita Ora	"Call Me Maybe"	Carly Rae Jepsen	"Let's Go"	Calvin Harris featuring Ne-Yo	
August 4	"Wide Awake"	Katy Perry	"Call Me Maybe"	Carly Rae Jepsen	"Let's Go"	Calvin Harris featuring Ne-Yo	
August 11	"Timebomb"	Kylie Minogue	"Call Me Maybe"	Carly Rae Jepsen	"Let's Go"	Calvin Harris featuring Ne-Yo	
August 18	"Goin' In"	Jennifer Lopez featuring Flo Rida	"Call Me Maybe"	Carly Rae Jepsen	"Let's Go"	Calvin Harris featuring Ne-Yo	
August 25	"Dark Side"	Kelly Clarkson	"Call Me Maybe"	Carly Rae Jepsen	"Let's Go"	Calvin Harris featuring Ne-Yo	
September 1	"Spectrum" †	Zedd featuring Matthew Koma	"Call Me Maybe"	Carly Rae Jepsen	"Let's Go"	Calvin Harris featuring Ne-Yo	
September 8	"Turn Up the Radio"	Madonna	"Call Me Maybe"	Carly Rae Jepsen	"Let's Go"	Calvin Harris featuring Ne-Yo	
September 15	"Scream"	Usher	"Call Me Maybe"	Carly Rae Jepsen	"Lights"	Ellie Goulding	
September 22	"Let's Have a Kiki"	Scissor Sisters	"Call Me Maybe"	Carly Rae Jepsen	"Lights"	Ellie Goulding	
September 29	"Spectrum (Say My Name)"	Florence and the Machine	"Call Me Maybe"	Carly Rae Jepsen	"Let's Go"	Calvin Harris featuring Ne-Yo	
October 6	"Hello"	Karmin	"Call Me Maybe"	Carly Rae Jepsen	"Spectrum"	Zedd featuring Matthew Koma	
October 13	"Pound the Alarm"	Nicki Minaj	"Call Me Maybe"	Carly Rae Jepsen	"Spectrum"	Zedd featuring Matthew Koma	
October 20	"Blow Me (One Last Kiss)"	Pink	"Call Me Maybe"	Carly Rae Jepsen	"Spectrum"	Zedd featuring Matthew Koma	
October 27	"Triumphant (Get 'Em)"	Mariah Carey	"Call Me Maybe"	Carly Rae Jepsen	"Blow Me (One Last Kiss)"	Pink	
November 3	"R.I.P."	Rita Ora featuring Tinie Tempah	"Trespassing"	Adam Lambert	"As Long as You Love Me"	Justin Bieber featuring Big Sean	
November 10	"Don't You Worry Child"	Swedish House Mafia featuring John Martin	"Bandz Bandz (Get Your Money Up)"	BandzUp	"Don't You Worry Child"	Swedish House Mafia featuring John Martin	
November 17	"Send Me Your Love"	Taryn Manning featuring Sultan & Ned Shepard	"Call Me Maybe"	Carly Rae Jepsen	"Don't You Worry Child"	Swedish House Mafia featuring John Martin	
November 24	"She Wolf (Falling to Pieces)"	David Guetta featuring Sia	"Bandz Bandz (Get Your Money Up)"	BandzUp	"Don't You Worry Child"	Swedish House Mafia featuring John Martin	
December 1	"Sweet Nothing"	Calvin Harris featuring Florence Welch	"Bandz Bandz (Get Your Money Up)"	BandzUp	"Don't You Worry Child"	Swedish House Mafia featuring John Martin	
December 8	"Your Body"	Christina Aguilera	"Call Me Maybe"	Carly Rae Jepsen	"Don't You Worry Child"	Swedish House Mafia featuring John Martin	
December 15	"Diamonds"	Rihanna	"Bandz Bandz (Get Your Money Up)	BandzUp	"Don't You Worry Child"	Swedish House Mafia featuring John Martin	
December 22	"Something for the Weekend"	Dave Audé featuring Luciana	"Flavor"	Tori Amos	"Don't You Worry Child"	Swedish House Mafia featuring John Martin	
December 29	"Anything Could Happen"	Ellie Goulding	"Come & Get It"	Krewella	"Don't You Worry Child"	Swedish House Mafia featuring John Martin	

== See also ==
- 2012 in American music
- List of Billboard Hot 100 number ones of 2012
