= I Told You So (Karmin song) =

Promotional single by Karmin

from the album Hello
- Released: May 9, 2012
- Recorded: 2011
- Genre: Hip hop; Electronica; Ska
- Length: 2:49
- Label: Epic
- Songwriters: Amy Heidemann, Nick Noonan, John Webb, Jr
- Producer: Jon Jon

"I Told You So" is a song by American recording duo Karmin, taken from their debut EP Hello. It was written by band members Amy Heidemann and Nick Noonan, as well as Elite and producer John "Jon Jon Traxx" Webb, Jr. The song features a primary hip hop influence, as well as elements of rock, electronica and ska.The song debuted live on Saturday Night Live on February 11, 2012. Heidemann and Noonan first performed a live acoustic snippet of the song on Elvis Duran and the Morning Show prior to their SNL appearance. "I Told You So" is said to pay homage to Chris Brown's "Look at Me Now", a song they covered on YouTube that brought them to fame.

== Background and development ==
The song was written and recorded in NYC, and produced by Jon Jon Traxx (Beyoncé, Ledisi). Band member Nick Noonan describes it as a "darker, more hybrid rap song," with a "blazing rap and pop hook."

The full-length clip of the track premiered on Vibe Magazine website on May 1, 2012, one week prior to their debut album's release. Due to the release of its music video, it was originally thought to be the second single, but "Hello" impacted US radio stations as the second single instead.

== Music video ==
Following their live performances of "Brokenhearted" and "I Told You So" on Saturday Night Live, Karmin collaborated with MTV and their creative team Scratch to produce the music video for "I Told You So". Shot at Acumen Stages in Brooklyn, New York City on February 15, the video premiered on May 9, 2012, the same day their debut EP was released. It starts with Amy in a dark room with a flashlight, before then changes to her in a hospital or mental institute with Nick posing as a doctor. He shows her pictures of people who have gone missing, and Amy is revealed to have a type of supernatural ability where she can look into the past and see how the person went missing. Initially all her visions do not reveal the perpetrator, but she is being given clues. A nurse walks in and leads Amy to a bed, where she notices Nick is holding a portrait of her. Using her supernatural ability on the portrait, Amy discovers that Nick was responsible for all the disappearances; he then injects her with a type of drug, presumably killing her.

== Live performances ==
The duo previewed the song in an acoustic live version on Elvis Duran in the Morning Show, two days prior to their live performance on Saturday Night Live, accompanied by songs producer Jon Jon Traxx on bass and keyboards. The duo have also performed the song acoustically on various occasions during their promotional radio tour.

== Credits and personnel ==
- Vocals: Karmin
- Songwriting: Amy Heidemann, Nick Noonan, John Webb, Jr
- Production: Jon Jon

Credits adapted from Hello album liner notes.
