= When the City Sleeps =

Studio album by Alex Isley
- Released: March 20, 2026
- Length: 53:34
- Label: Free Lunch; Warner
- Producer: Abrhm; Camper; Jack Dine; D'Mile; Larrance Dopson; Freaky Rob; Gitty; Josh Grant; Kaytranada; Oh Gosh

Alex Isley chronology
When (2025)	When the City Sleeps (2026)

Singles from When the City Sleeps
- 1. "Sweetest Lullabye" Released: February 13, 2026; 2. "Westside" Released: March 13, 2026

When the City Sleeps is the major label debut album by American singer-songwriter Alex Isley. It was released on March 20, 2026, through Free Lunch Records, an imprint of Warner Records. "Sweetest Lullabye" and "Westside" were released as singles in support of the album, which also includes the six tracks from Isley's When (2025) EP. Isley will embark on the When the City Sleeps Tour from May through June 2026 in support of the album.

Isley has described the album as "snapshot of her thoughts", while its title refers to "a specific point during the evening, and the stillness that comes when the day slows down". Collaborators on the album include James Fauntleroy and Syd, while producers on the album include Darhyl Camper and Kaytranada.

== Track listing ==
When the City Sleeps track listing
No.	Title	Writer(s)	Producer(s)	Length
1.	"Holding On"	Alexandra Isley	Jack Dine	2:50
2.	"Ms. Goody Two Shoes"	Isley	Camper; Branden Rowell^{[a]}; Jon Jon Traxx^{[a]}	3:00
3.	"Alone"	Isley; Varren Wade	D'Mile	4:35
4.	"Moonlight on Vermont"	Isley	Oh Gosh	4:53
5.	"Mic On"	Isley; Louis Celestin	Kaytranada; Tek Lun^{[a]}	2:32
6.	"Westside"	Isley	Abrhm; Freaky Rob	2:58
7.	"Chamomile"	Isley	Josh Grant	2:38
8.	"Hands"	Isley; Robert Debouse; Camper; Terrell Roper	Camper	2:52
9.	"Starry Eyes"	Isley; Sean Wander	Camper	4:49
10.	"When the City Sleeps" (featuring James Fauntleroy)	Isley	Oh Gosh	4:16
11.	"PCH" (with Syd)	Isley	Larrance Dopson	3:55
12.	"Sweetest Lullabye"	Isley; Wade	D'Mile	4:15
13.	"Fool's Gold"	Isley; Leoren Davis	Oh Gosh	3:12
14.	"Thank You for a Lovely Time"	Isley	Oh Gosh	3:20
15.	"Maybe Again"	Isley	Gitty	3:29
Total length:				53:34

=== Note ===
- ^{^[a]} signifies an additional producer

== Personnel ==
Credits adapted from Tidal.

- Alex Isley – vocals
- Jack Dine – engineering (tracks 1, 5, 13, 14)
- Noe Corona – engineering (2, 8)
- Ben Desoto – engineering (3, 4, 6, 7, 9, 10, 12, 15)
- Sam Lorimore – engineering (11)
- Gianluca Girard – additional engineering, mixing assistance
- Anthony Vega – additional engineering (6)
- Joshua Pleeter – mixing, mastering
- Heoliny Jung – mixing assistance
- D'Mile – programming (3, 12)
- Oh Gosh – programming (4)
- Kaytranada – programming (5)
- Abrhm – programming (6)
- Freaky Rob – programming (6)
- Josh Grant – programming (7)
- Robert Debouse – instruments (8)
- Camper – programming (9)
- James Fauntleroy – vocals (10)
- Larrance Dopson – programming (11)
- Syd – vocals (11)
- Gitty – programming (15)
