= Acapella (Karmin song) =

Single by Karmin

from the album Pulses
- Released: July 9, 2013
- Recorded: 2013
- Genre: Comedy hip hop; pop-rap
- Length: 3:18
- Label: Epic
- Songwriters: Amy Heidemann; Nick Noonan; Sam Hollander; Martin Johnson
- Producer: Martin Johnson

Karmin singles chronology
"Hello" (2012)	"Acapella" (2013)	"I Want It All" (2014)

"Acapella" is a song by American music duo Karmin. It was released on July 9, 2013, by Epic Records as the lead single from their debut studio album, Pulses (2014). The single was written by group members Amy Heidemann and Nick Noonan, as well as Sam Hollander and Boys Like Girls frontman, Martin Johnson, who produced the single. The track reached the top ten in Australia and New Zealand.

== Background and concept ==
The single was co-written by group members Amy Heidemann and Nick Noonan, along with Sam "S*A*M" Hollander, while production duties were handled by Boys Like Girls frontman Martin Johnson. The instrumental concept of the song was inspired by the film Pitch Perfect (2012), a movie about an all-A cappella singing group. The song itself is a mix of human voices with limited instrumentation. Over a "booming bass line," Amy raps about finding Mr. Right and realizing he wasn't so perfect after all.

== Critical reception ==
"Acapella" received mixed reviews from music critics. Amy Sciarretto of PopCrush gave the song 4 stars out of 5, stating "'Acapella' is a song about gaining your independence from dudes who are duds. Thematically, it could be this decade's answer to 'Single Ladies', without being quite so anthemic and obvious." Adam Soybel at blog POP! Goes The Charts called it a "cute song", noting that "they sound like they're having fun", but at the same time, pointed out the risks of releasing it as a single. Mikeal Wood of the Los Angeles Times gave the song a highly negative review, stating: "Released last month, 'Acapella' is bad, no doubt about it: lame melody, lame beat, lame rapping by Heidemann, who shamelessly copies herself copying [Chris] Brown's staccato flow from 'Look at Me Now'". In 2015, Billboard included "Acapella" on its list of "The 10 Worst Songs of the 2010s (So Far)", describing it as "the result of a focus group aimed at beguiling Millennials" and that the song "completely falls apart when Amy Heidemann actually goes a cappella in the final minute."

== Commercial performance ==
"Acapella" entered the Australian ARIA Singles Chart at number seventeen for the week of July 28, 2013. The following week, it jumped to number eight, and peaked at number four the next week, becoming the duo's second top-ten hit in Australia, following, and succeeding "Brokenhearted", which peaked at number nine. In New Zealand, the single rose steadily, reaching a new peak of number nine, and also followed the success of "Brokenhearted", which peaked at number five. It was certified Platinum in New Zealand. Domestically, "Acapella" became their third single to chart on the US Billboard Hot 100, reaching number seventy-two. It has Been Certified 3× platinum in Australia for selling 140,000 Copies there.

== Live performances ==
Karmin first performed the song live in an acoustic setting for Ryan Seacrest's Pick Your Purse party in late June 2013. On July 10, 2013, the duo performed the song on Jimmy Kimmel Live!, along with several other songs to be featured on their upcoming debut album Pulses. They also performed the song on 2nd Indonesian Choice Awards.

== Music video ==
Karmin in the Hype Williams-inspired "Acapella" music video

The music video for "Acapella" was directed by Matt Stawski, while creative direction and choreography was handled by Richard "Richy Squirrel" Jackson. Filming took place in early June 2013. The treatment for the video was written by band member Amy Heidemann. The visuals of the music video were inspired by 90's music videos the group grew up watching, mostly drawn from director Hype Williams, and artists such as Busta Rhymes, Missy Elliott, TLC, Brandy and Destiny's Child. Amy and Nick rock red, blue and green color-coordinated outfits and accessories while performing choreographed moves. Products from Coach, Mercedes Benz, Olive Garden and United Nude are featured in the video. The video premiered on Cosmopolitan's website July 12 and premiered on Vevo July 13.

The duo said of the concept: "The video for 'Acapella' is visually something we've always wanted to put out. Our first few major label videos didn't totally capture who Karmin is", explains the duo. "It feels good to create something like this where we are at the helm and can really be proud of. The video definitely pays homage to the 90's videos we grew up with and are still inspired by today."

== Credits and personnel ==
- Songwriting – Amy Heidemann, Nick Noonan, Sam Hollander, Martin Johnson
- Production – Martin Johnson, additional by Kyle Moorman and Brandon Paddock
- Mixing – Serban Ghenea
- Engineering – Kyle Moorman, Brandon Paddock

Credits adapted from Pulses album liner notes.

== Charts ==
=== Weekly charts ===
Weekly chart performance for "Acapella"
Chart (2013)	Peak position
Australia (ARIA)	4
Belgium (Ultratop 50 Wallonia)	30
Canada Hot 100 (Billboard)	63
New Zealand (Recorded Music NZ)	9
US Billboard Hot 100	72
US Pop Airplay (Billboard)	34

=== Year-end charts ===
Year-end chart performance for "Acapella"
Chart (2013)	Position
Australia (ARIA)	33

== Certifications ==
Region	Certification	Certified units/sales
Australia (ARIA)	3× Platinum	210,000^{^}
Canada (Music Canada)	Gold	40,000^{*}
New Zealand (RMNZ)	Platinum	15,000^{*}
United States (RIAA)	Gold	500,000^{‡}
^{*} Sales figures based on certification alone.^{^} Shipments figures based on certification alone.^{‡} Sales+streaming figures based on certification alone.

== Release history ==
Release dates and formats for "Acapella"
Region	Date	Format	Label(s)	Ref.
United States	June 18, 2013	Mainstream airplay	Epic	
