= I Want It All (Karmin song) =

Song by Karmin

Single by Karmin

from the album Pulses
- Released: January 28, 2014
- Recorded: 2013
- Genre: Disco; funk
- Length: 3:47
- Label: Epic
- Songwriters: Ester Dean; Amy Heidemann; Nick Noonan
- Producer: Ryan Williamson

Karmin singles chronology
"Acapella" (2013)	"I Want It All" (2014)	"Sugar" (2014)

Music video
- "I Want It All" on YouTube

"I Want It All" is a song by American music duo Karmin. It was released on January 28, 2014, as the second single from their debut studio album, Pulses (2014). The single was written by group members Amy Heidemann and Nick Noonan, and songwriter Ester Dean.

== Background and concept ==
"I Want It All" is a disco-pop song. It is most notable without rapping, which is a common choice in most of their other work.

== Critical reception ==
"I Want It All" received positive reviews from mainstream music critics and fans alike. The most popular criticism of "I Want It All" is that unlike their previous work, "I Want It All" includes Noonan's vocalizing and Heidemann's singing. Some people think that "I Want It All" was an interesting departure and prefer it over their previous single, "Acapella". Comparisons have been made to Justin Timberlake's "Take Back the Night" because of its slick disco-tinged pop tune. MTV Buzzworthy noted that "I Want It All" has a mixture of Justin Timberlake's "Take Back the Night" and DJ Cassidy, Jessie J and Robin Thicke's "Calling All Hearts".

== Music video ==
The music video and/or lyric video was released on YouTube on the release date of the single, January 28, 2014. According to Heidemann, the lyric video is something like the music video. "We just shot the video," Heidemann explained. "We just threw up a lyric video which is actually the storyboard of the video." The duo got the idea from the storyboard and they wanted to show off their drawings in the video. "Every time you make a music video they make a storyboard and I was like, these drawings are really great, why don’t we show that to the fans so they can see how it turned out on the 28th," Heidemann added.

The official music video was released on February 21, 2014, on YouTube and Vevo. It shows the couple singing, dancing, playing instruments while their backup dancers dance in rollerskates.

== Track listing ==
Digital download

1. "I Want It All" – 3:47

== Credits and personnel ==
- Vocals: Karmin
- Songwriting: Ester Dean, Amy Heidemann, Nick Noonan
- Production: Ryan Williamson

Credits adapted from Pulses album liner notes.

== Chart performance ==
Chart (2014)	Peak position
US Pop Airplay (Billboard)	39
