= Crash Your Party =

Single by Karmin
- Released: October 28, 2011
- Recorded: September 2011
- Genre: Pop; dance-pop; hip hop
- Length: 3:25
- Label: Sony Music; Epic
- Songwriters: Amy Heidemann; Nick Noonan; Andrew Harr; Jermaine Jackson; Heather Bright; Kelly Sheehan; Andres Titus; William McLean; John Coltrane; Ridge Morton
- Producer: The Runners

Karmin singles chronology
"Take It Away" (2011)	"Crash Your Party" (2011)	"Brokenhearted" (2012)

"Crash Your Party" is a song by pop-rap duo Karmin. It was written by the duo, with Heather Bright, Kelly Sheehan and Harr and Jackson, with the latter two serving as producers. By late 2011, the single got moderate responses from radio stations. The song was first promoted by radio on October 28, 2011, and was then available for digital download on October 30.

== Background and conception ==
The single was written by Amy Heidemann, Nick Noonan, Heather Bright, Kelly Sheehan and Andrew Harr and Jermaine Jackson. The single was also produced by The Runners. The song is described as an "anthem for the people who want that one person in their lives to know that they're not always the center of attention as cited by the chorus' lyrics "You think you're the star of the show/But I'm about to let you know". The song charted at No. 36 on the Billboard Pop Songs chart. The duo felt it was perfect choice for a first single by how they were introduced to the business through the fans, that they were "crashing the [music] industry's party".

"Crash Your Party" begins with a sample from the song "The Choice Is Yours (Revisited)" (1991) by alternative hip hop duo Black Sheep. The sampled material is a seven-note motif played on double bass by jazz musician Ron Carter, and the motif was likewise used as the opening notes of "The Choice Is Yours". The Carter audio was itself was sampled by Black Sheep from the 1975 recording of "Impressions" on pianist McCoy Tyner's album Trident (the motif first appears on the Tyner recording at 3:03 in the track). Because "Impressions" was composed by John Coltrane (though Coltrane did not compose the bass motif played by Carter in 1975), Coltrane is listed as a composer of "Crash Your Party".

== Music video ==
The "Crash Your Party" music video was released on December 7, 2011, where it received about eight million views in its first month of release.

== Credits and personnel ==
- Vocals: Karmin
- Songwriting: Amy Heidemann, Nick Noonan, Andrew Harr, Jermaine Jackson, Heather Bright, Kelly Sheehan, Andres Titus, William McLean, John Coltrane, Ridge Morton
- Production: The Runners

Credits adapted from Hello album liner notes.

== Chart performance ==
Chart (2011)	Peak position
Japan (Japan Hot 100)	86
US Mainstream Top 40 (Billboard)	36

== Release history ==
Release dates and formats for "Crash Your Party"
Region	Date	Format	Label(s)	Ref.
United States	November 8, 2011	Mainstream airplay	Epic	
