= Come with Me (Pure Imagination) =

Single by Karmin

from the album Leo Rising
- Released: February 19, 2016
- Recorded: 2014–2015
- Genre: Indie pop; R&B
- Length: 3:19
- Label: Checkbook
- Songwriter(s): Amy Heidemann; Nick Noonan; Leslie Bricusse; Anthony Newley
- Producer(s): Nick Noonan; Unkle Steve

Karmin singles chronology
"Didn't Know You" (2015)	"Come with Me (Pure Imagination)" (2016)	"Blame It On My Heart" (2016)

"Come with Me (Pure Imagination)" is a song by American music duo Karmin. It was released via Checkbook records on February 19, 2016 as the fourth single from their second studio album based on the zodiac "Leo Rising".

The song is a cover remix of Pure Imagination, specifically written for the 1971 American movie Willy Wonka & the Chocolate Factory, by British composers Leslie Bricusse and Anthony Newley, and sung by Gene Wilder, who played the title character. The 2016 song was written by Amy Heidemann, Leslie Bricusse, Anthony Newley, and Nick Noonan, and produced by the latter. It is the Leo track from Leo Rising.

== Background ==
Karmin released their debut album Pulses through Epic Records on March 25, 2014. In September of the same year, Karmin announced that they had split with Epic Records to once again become independent artists. The successor to their debut album Pulses, Leo Rising, is set to be released sometime in 2016 and is wholly recorded by only Karmin with Nick Noonan producing every track. It is a concept album based on the zodiac sign where every song released on the album is based on a zodiac sign, "Come with Me (Pure Imagination)" is the Leo track.

== Promotion ==
Karmin released "Come with Me (Pure Imagination)" to their mobile app on Christmas Day as a Christmas gift to their fans. It was available for pre-order a week before its release on February 19, 2016.

== Critical reception ==
Luiz Gonzalez from Album Confessions gave a positive review saying; "a sense of the duo's own style is present. With minimal, raw production (the hand claps, the backing vocals) and emotive delivery, the release sounds like an honest creation with R&B flare, not a desperate label push." Hayden Manders from Nylon called said that "This song dives deep into the creative part of the sign and is a track about finding courage within yourself."

== Music video ==
On the day of the single's release, an audio video was released with a gif of a lagoon repeating as the song played. According to a comment left by Karmin on the video, the lagoon is the setting of the upcoming music video set to be released "soon". The music video was released on March 2, 2016.

== Track listing ==
Digital Download
No.	Title	Writer(s)	Producer(s)	Length
1.	"Come with Me (Pure Imagination)"	Amy Heidemann, Nick Noonan, Anthony Newley, Leslie Bricusse	Noonan	3:07
