= Didn't Know You =

Single by Karmin

from the album Leo Rising
- Released: June 2, 2015
- Recorded: March 2014
- Genre: Indie pop; pop rock
- Length: 3:07
- Label: P.I.C
- Songwriter(s): Amy Heidemann; Nick Noonan
- Producer(s): Nick Noonan

Karmin singles chronology
"Along the Road" (2015)	"Didn't Know You" (2015)	"Come With Me (Pure Imagination)" (2016)

"Didn't Know You" is a song by American music duo Karmin. It was released via P.I.C records on June 2, 2015. It is the second single from their sophomore album Leo Rising which was released in September 2016. The song was written by members Amy Heidemann and Nick Noonan, and was produced by band member Nick Noonan.

== Background ==
In an e-mail sent to their subscribers, Karmin announced that "Didn't Know You" was the first single from their debut album Leo Rising, although after the official track listing was released it was mentioned that there was a relisting of the album's songs to include "Along the Road", a single released previously to "Didn't Know You". "Didn't Know You" is the Gemini song from Leo Rising, each song from Leo Rising has a matching zodiac sign. In a statement to Billboard, Karmin said "The Gemini track is a story of betrayal, we wanted the listener to feel the passion and energy in the story, so we built it on a driving bass line with a syncopated drum groove which opens up to a full rhythm section of aggressive, pissed-off drummers."

== Promotion ==
Karmin released an acoustic version of "Didn't Know You" onto the Karmin app for free in early September, later posting a video of the performance on their Facebook page. It features backup vocals from singers Shawna Corso and Jennifer Criss. It was later uploaded onto YouTube on September 10, 2015.

== Music video ==
A teaser for the music video for "Didn't Know You" was released on May 27, 2015. The official music video, directed by Stewart Yost of The Picture Council was released on July 16, 2015.

The music video, set in an 1850s western style starts off with a bounty hunter picking up binoculars to reveal wanted signs of Amy and a mystery woman (Britni Sumida). There is then a duel between Amy and the mystery woman, it begins at the bell of 12 o'clock after it is seen that Nick (who is whistling), four dancers and the Man in Blue (seen in the Sugar, Yesterday and Along the Road videos) are in waiting for the bell of 12 o'clock. At the draw of their pistols it is revealed that Amy has no bullets in her gun, and after she is shot down by the mystery woman who starts walking away, the mystery woman is then shot by the bounty hunter on the top of a mountain. After the bounty hunter comes down to check if the two are dead, and starts walking away, it is revealed Amy is still alive and pulls out a tiny pistol unbeknownst to everyone else. She shoots the bounty hunter in the back, killing him before dying. It is revealed, in flashback, that Nick Noonan, who provided the guns for the duel, had taken the bullets out of Amy's gun, leaving the mystery woman with an advantage. In between scenes, there are clips of Amy and 4 other women dancing, as well as Amy lying dead on the ground, singing. In the end, Amy stands behind a white wall, shirtless with her hat in front of her chest with blood coming down her stomach. She then turns around to reveal a bullet wound in her lower back. Some footage of the landscape ends and starts the video.

An alternate video is featured on the spring Journeys DVD which features Amy singing the song on a stage, under a single spotlight, in front of a curtain.

== Track listing ==
Digital Download
No.	Title	Writer(s)	Producer(s)	Length
1.	"Didn't Know You"	Amy Heidemann, Nick Noonan,	Noonan	3:07

== Credits and personnel ==
Information based on credits for "Didn't Know You" from Karmin app.

- Amy Heidemann: Lead Vocals, Background vocals
- Nick Noonan: Production, percussion, background vocals.
- Andrew Maltese: Recording Engineer
- Andrew Dawson: Mixing
- Mike Malchicoff: Mix assistant
- Chris Athens: Mastering
- Dave Huffman: Mastering

== Commercial performance ==
"Didn't Know You" debuted at #1 on The Music Nation's Airplay 100 Charts on the week being August 31, 2015. It was above artists such as Demi Lovato, Galantis, 5 Seconds of Summer, Tove Lo and Foxes.

== Critical reception ==
Kel & Mel reviews gave "Didn't Know You" a positive review saying; "Describing the moments where her dreams crashed and she had to rebuild, Heidermann's voice is strong and a good fit for the pop-rock production." They complemented the lyricism stating: "The lyrics are descriptive and treat the moments described as a lesson learned and not a pity party."
