= Along the Road (song) =

Single by Karmin

from the album Leo Rising
- Written: 2012
- Released: March 24, 2015
- Recorded: 2015
- Genre: Indie pop; folk
- Length: 3:11
- Label: Karmin Music; RED
- Songwriters: Amy Heidemann; Nick Noonan; J. Gliteman; Elijah Blake; Hasham Hussein; Denarius Motes
- Producer: Nick Noonan

Karmin singles chronology
"Yesterday" (2014)	"Along the Road" (2015)	"Didn't Know You" (2015)

"Along the Road" is a single by American music duo Karmin, released on March 24, 2015.

== Critical reception ==
Luiz Gonzalez from Album Confessions gave "Along the Road" a positive review saying that it "screams indie pop" and that "It's original. It's heartfelt. It's Karmin." He continued, "lead singer Amy Heidemann croons on the soulful, mid-tempo single. It's a vocal performance that deserves and commands attention." Gonzalez complemented the music video for its lack of distracting choreography or other storylines. Heather Allen from Mind Equals Blown gave "Along the Road" a positive review and a rating of 7.5/10. stating "has something a little more special about it than the average pop slow song." She referenced "Neon Love" and "Tidal Wave" from their debut album Pulses when calling Along the Road 'special' and "not a regular mid tempo song."

== Personnel ==
Information based on the credits sections for "Along the Road" from the Karmin App.

- Amy Heidemann: lead vocals, background vocals
- Nick Noonan: production, percussion, background vocals
- Jeff Gitty Gitelman: guitars, string arrangements
- Andrew Maltese: recording engineer
- Andrew Dawson: mixing
- Mike Malchicoff: mix assistant
- Chris Athens: mastering
- Dave Huffman: mastering

== Music video ==
A music video, which presents both Amy and Nick performing the song with guitarist Jeff "Gitty" Gitelman after being introduced by a man in a blue suit portrayed by Steve Tirogene. The video premiered exclusively on Billboard on March 24, 2015, the same day it was released for digital download and streaming. The set of the music video was created by Karmin along with a small team of artists, talking to Billboard they said:We knew we were gonna shoot the video on a Wednesday, the Wednesday prior nothing was done yet. So we somehow got a thousand sample shoes from Creative Rec, which were amazing, it was perfect," Noonan explains. "Then we went to Home Depot on Sunday, got all this plywood and paint, painted all the plywood black, made framing and then started drilling them in." "And it started hailing, the paint was running everywhere," Heidemann said.

The video was shot in only one take. As to the set of the music video the shoe wall and chandelier used in the video were designed and handmade by an art team led by Karmin and director Stewart Yost. The shoes used were provided by Creative Recreation. The wall of shoes was donated to NYC's St. Mary's Hospital for Children. Whilst the full pairs of shoes from the video were donated to the homeless.
