= V-Moda =

American audio equipment manufacturer

V-MODA
- Company type: Private
- Industry: Audio electronics
- Founded: 2004
- Fate: Acquired by Roland Corporation
- Headquarters: Hollywood, California, United States
- Key people: Val Kolton, Founder & CEO; Joseph Bucknall, Co-Founder & Chief Designer
- Products: Headphone, earphone, amplifier, protection ear plugs and accessories
- Website: v-moda.com

V-MODA is a private company that specializes in the design and production of mobile audio products, including headphones, earphones, portable amplifiers, protection ear plugs and accessories.

== Company ==
Founded in 2004 as an audio manufacturer, V-Moda is one of the first companies to popularize the fashion headphones industry. V-MODA is a professional headphone brand used by DJs and audiophiles.

=== History ===
The company was founded in 2004 by Val Kolton, a professional DJ and producer. He originally focused on technological innovation and new patents to develop the "Kolton Technology" fashion headphone lines for DJs. The products and brand were designed in Italy, in Milan and Venice, on frequent design research trips. In 2006 the firm launched several product lines and became the first high-fidelity fashion headphone manufacturer, with 33,000 units in 11 colors, and the company changed its name to V-MODA.

In 2007, working with Apple, the company released the Vibe Duo product line completely designed for Apple iPhones and iPods. This was the first third-party headphone for the Apple iPhone and iPod.

V-MODA began developing the M series in 2010. 2011 saw the launch of the first M series on-ear headphones, the M-80, soon followed by the M-100 over-ear headphones. Around the same time, the company opened its Hong Kong office to handle logistics, manufacturing and sales for the Asia Pacific and Europe Rrgions. In 2013, Val Kolton moved to Milan and Munich to form V-MODA Milano S.r.l. design studios. V-MODA Milano creates and designs all the products and content for V-MODA worldwide subsidiaries.

In 2016, V-MODA began a partnership with Roland Corporation. In 2019, V-MODA was fully acquired by Roland.

=== Locations ===
The company has offices in Hollywood, California in United States and a design studio in Milan, Italy. Regional offices are also located in London and Hong Kong. The firm assembles custom products in Los Angeles and has factories in Japan and Shenzhen, China. V-MODA has sales channels in Italy, France, Germany, UK, Spain, Switzerland, Belgium, Netherlands, Russia, Hong Kong, China, Thailand, Singapore, Japan, Canada, USA.
