= Audrey Napoleon =

American electronic music producer and entrepreneur

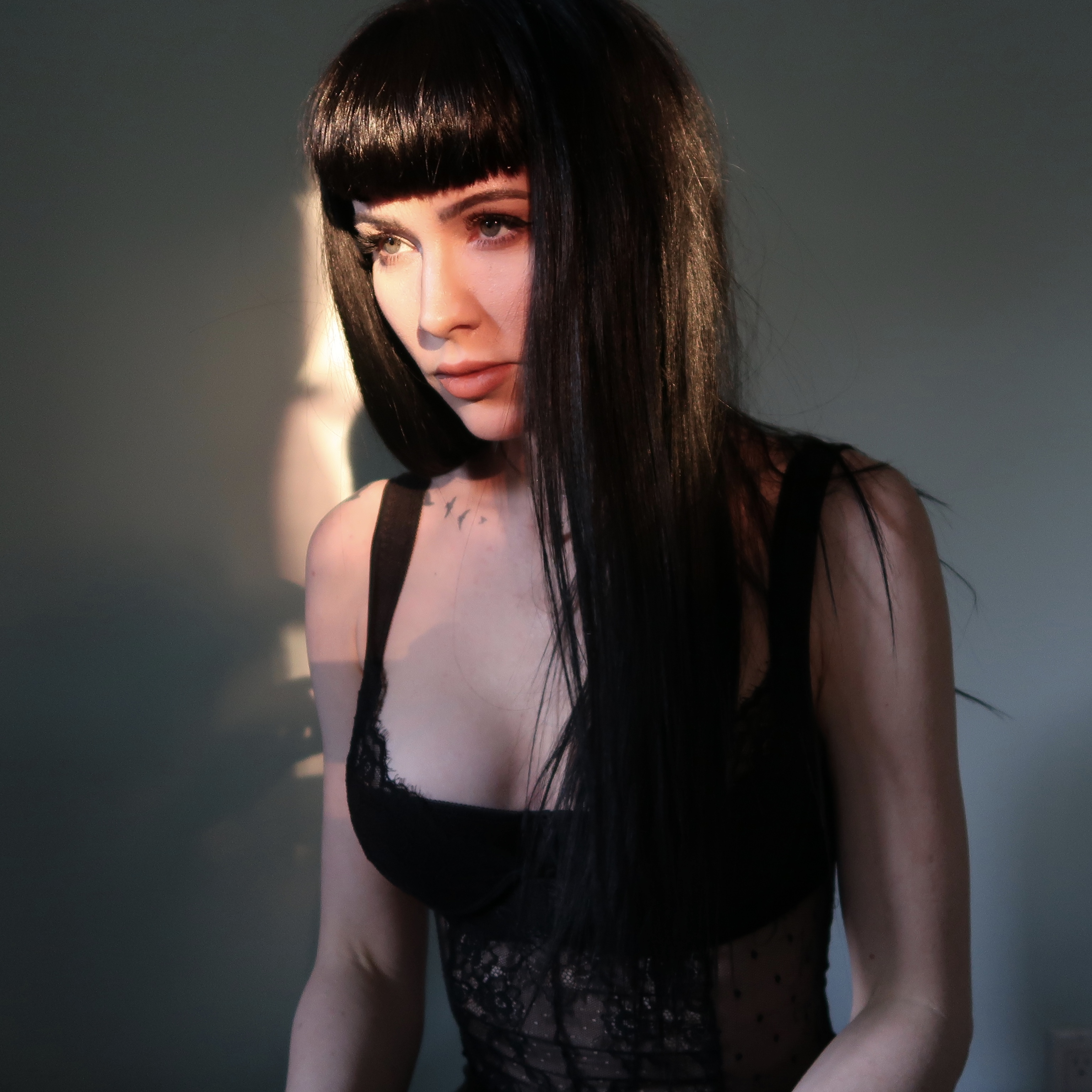
- Napoleon in 2019

Background information
- Genres: Electronic music, House music
- Occupation: Record Producer • DJ • Creative Director • Entrepreneur
- Years active: 2008–Current
- Labels: Mau5trap, Ultra Music, Wind-up Records
- Website: audreynapoleon.com

Audrey Napoleon is an American electronic music producer, DJ and entrepreneur.

== Career ==
Napoleon's career began in the Los Angeles club scene in 2008.

Named one of the 15 most important women in EDM by Marie Claire, after 3 years on the scene, Napoleon reached multi-platinum status with hit single written for the 'Reach the Sunrise' Heineken campaign that aired globally from 2011–2014. The campaign was projected to over 1 million people on New Year's Eve 2012 in Times Square.

After her release of Ornamental Egos, Napoleon became one of the top 10 female DJ/Producers touring the world. Napoleon followed this with the release of the single "Dope a la Mode", which was featured as one of the Top 10 Tracks of the year by DJ Mag.

Napoleon produced three original tracks for Swedish commercial director Fredrik Bond's Sundance Award-winning film, The Necessary Death of Charlie Countryman in 2013, starring Shia LaBeouf and Evan Rachel Wood.

An original song from Napoleon's Ornamental Egos EP, "Only You", was featured in the season finale of Naomi Campbell's television series The Face.

Napoleon has performed with artists such as The Cure, Skrillex, Kaskade, Deadmau5, Nero, Steve Angello and Tiesto at some of the world's largest music festivals, including Coachella, EDC, and Escape from Wonderland, as well performing at the American Music Awards and the Grammy Awards.

Between 2011 and 2013, Napoleon created a short film for her single "Poison", co-directing the styling and makeup.

In 2012, Napoleon collaborated with The Rodnik Brand. Napoleon starred in the campaign, as well as advising on Creative and Art Direction. This campaign was featured in Italian Vogue and Nylon magazine.

Between 2013 and 2015, Napoleon starred in award-winning V-Moda M100 headphones campaign, advised in Creative Direction as well as Makeup and Styling. This campaign was featured in American Vogue.

In 2014, Napoleon was unveiled as Ardency Inn's new eyeliner headliner. The Modster eyeliner kits included Ardency Inn's eyeliner in black, blue, and gold. With her Ardency Inn campaign, Napoleon joined only Nervo as dance music artists with cosmetics contracts (the duo has been signed with Cover Girl since 2012).

== Founder and CEO of Gostrider ==
=== 2019–present ===
Napoleon founded Gostrider in 2019 aiming to support music artist's grow their followers and listeners through beauty brands.

== Discography ==
=== Singles ===
- 2010: "This is Fucking Techno" (Circuit Freq Records)
- 2011: "Group Games" (Death Proof Recordings)
- 2011: "Mission: Sleep" (Death Proof Recordings)
- 2011: "Bird Lynch" (Circuit Freq Records)
- 2011: "Foxy Boxy" (SQE Music)
- 2012: "Banana Soda Es Muy Loca" (SQE Music)
- 2012: "#MySunrise" (SQE Music) (Heineken #MySunrise Ad) (Triple Platinum, Cannes Lion Award, Piaf Award)
- 2012: "Green +15" (SQE Music)
- 2013: "Dope A La Mode" (SQE Music)
- 2017: "Breathe" (Datacode Records)
- 2018: "Dope A La Mode (2018)" (Independent Records)
- 2023: "That's All the Lemonade"
- 2023: "The Jump Up"

=== EPs ===
- 2012: Ornamental Egos (SQE Music)

=== Remixes ===
- 2011: D. Ramirez – "Everybody Has the Right" (Toolroom Records)
- 2013: C.C. Sheffield – "Long Brown Hair" (Ultra Records)
- 2014: Filter – "Surprise" (Wind-up Records)
- 2014: Le Castle Vania – "Disintegration" (mau5trap)
- 2015: Colette Carr – "Static" (Kawaii Nation)

=== Mixed compilations ===
- 2010: Death Techno 015 (Death Techno)
- 2012: Prospects (Death Proof Recordings)
- 2013: Keep It Death Proof (Death Proof Recordings)
