= United Nude =

United Nude is a design company specialising in high heels. The brand's shoes are sold in over 50 countries world, with concept stores in Amsterdam, Vienna, Tel Aviv, Tokyo, Taipei, Beijing, Guangzhou and Los Angeles.

== History ==
The company was founded by Rem D. Koolhaas (not to be mistaken for architect Rem Koolhaas, his namesake and uncle) and British shoemaker Galahad Clark, whose family founded the Clarks brand.
