= Alex Isley =

American singer-songwriter and producer

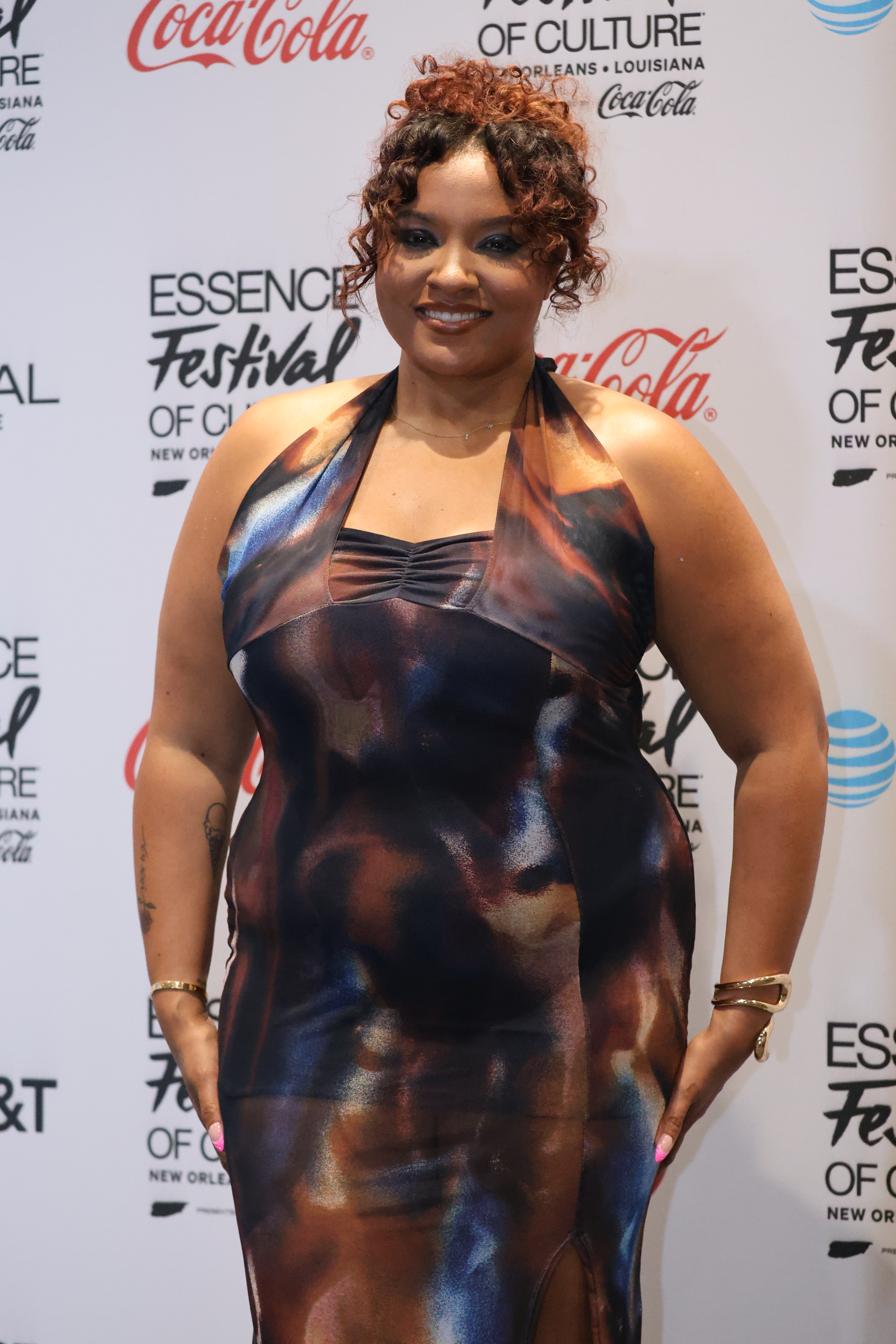
- Isley at Essence Fest 2025

Background information
- Born: Alexandra Isley; April 16, 1987 (age 39); Westwood, New Jersey, U.S.
- Origin: Los Angeles, California, U.S.
- Genres: R&B; soul; neo soul
- Occupations: Singer-songwriter, producer
- Instrument: Vocals
- Years active: 2012–present
- Labels: Free Lunch Agency; Warner
- Father: Ernie Isley

Alexandra Isley (born April 16, 1987) is an American singer-songwriter and producer. She released her debut EP The Love/Art Memoirs in 2012. Isley has worked with artists including Scarface, Terrace Martin, Masego, 9th Wonder, Rapsody, Tank and the Bangas, and Lucky Daye. Isley has been nominated for three Grammy Awards.

== Early life and education ==
Born Alexandra Isley, she is the daughter of Ernie Isley of the prolific soul group the Isley Brothers. Isley was born in New Jersey, but spent most of her childhood in Los Angeles. She named Stevie Wonder, Prince, Ella Fitzgerald, Toni Braxton, Aaliyah, and Mariah Carey as early favorite musicians. She loved singing from childhood and her family supported her pursuit of music as a professional career.

She began classical vocal training at age 12 and later graduated from LA County High School for the Arts. Isley received her bachelor's degree from UCLA, where she studied in the jazz department.

Isley has synesthesia, and described the phenomenon to LA Weekly: "There's a canvas in my mind, and the whole thing is painted, or it's a continuous wave of color...Sometimes I'll start composing something and I'll have to change the key because the color won't sit right with me."

== Career ==
Isley released her self-produced debut EP The Love Art/Memoirs in 2012. Okayplayer reviewed the EP positively: "please believe Alex’s lush vocals over her own calming production is capable of spawning a generation of love babies much like “Between The Sheets” did."

Isley described her music as r&b with hip hop and jazz influences. Samantha Callender of Essence referred to her voice as "silky smooth vocals that ride neo-soul melodies." She has collaborated with artists such as 9th Wonder on the track "Rain Clouds"; Lucky Daye and Masego on "Good & Plenty (Remix)"; Chromonicci on "Interstellar"; and Christian Kuria on "Toroka."

In November 2019 she released the joint EP Wilton with producer Jack Dine. In May 2020 Isley performed a remote concert and a studio concert June 2025 for NPR's Tiny Desk series. In 2020 she was also a featured vocalist for the Cautious Clay track "Reaching", on the soundtrack for Insecure's fourth season.

In 2022 she released Marigold, a collaborative album with Jack Dine. Jackie B. of Soul Bounce reviewed the project positively: "Alex Isley and Jack Dine remain as a melodious match made in heaven as they take us through a cycle from sprout to blossom to full bloom on Marigold." She was featured on Tank's recent single "No Limit" from his 10th album R&B Money.

Isley released the album I Left My Heart in Ladera with Terrace Martin in October 2023. The album, her first to chart on Billboard, debuted at number two on Billboard's Contemporary Jazz Albums list and at number 22 on Jazz Albums.

She earned her first two Grammy Award nominations as a featured artist on "Back to Love" by Robert Glasper at the 66th Annual Grammy Awards. The song was nominated for Best R&B Song and Best R&B Performance.

In February 2025, Isley signed to the imprint Free Lunch Agency which is distributed by Warner Records.

== Personal life ==
Isley resides in Los Angeles. She has a daughter with singer Kenyon Dixon (b. 2017).

== Discography ==
=== Albums ===
List of studio albums, with selected chart positions
Title	Details	Peak chart positions	
Title	Details	Con. Jazz	Jazz
Dreams in Analog	Released: August 10, 2013; Label: self-released	—	—
L U X U R Y	Released: December 26, 2015; Label: self-released	—	—
Marigold (with Jack Dine)	Released: March 30, 2022; Label: self-released	—	—
I Left My Heart in Ladera (with Terrace Martin)	Released: October 20, 2023; Label: Sounds of Crenshaw, BMG	2	22
When the City Sleeps	Released: March 20, 2026; Label: Free Lunch, Warner Records	TBD	TBD

=== Extended plays ===
List of extended plays, with selected details
Title	Details
The Love/Art Memoirs	Released: May 20, 2012; Label: Self-released
The Beauty of Everything, Part 1	Released: February 27, 2018; Label: Self-released
The Beauty of Everything, Part Two	Released: May 3, 2019; Label: Self-released
Wilton (with Jack Dine)	Released: November 15, 2019; Label: Isley & Dine Records
WHEN	Released: April 18, 2025; Label: Free Lunch, Warner Records
Live from NPR's Tiny Desk	Released: October 24, 2025; Label: Free Lunch, Warner Records

=== Singles ===
List of singles, as lead artist, showing year released and album name
Title	Year	Album
"La Brea"	2015	L U X U R Y
"Feel No Love"	2017	Non-album single
"On II U"	2017	The Beauty of Everything, Pt. 1
"We'll Always Have Paris"	2018	The Beauty of Everything, Pt. 2
"Think of Me" (with Jack Dine)	2019	Wilton
"Gone" (with Jack Dine)	2020	Non-album single
"People Get Ready" (with Terrace Martin and Robert Glasper)	2020	I Can't Breathe / Music For the Movement
"Reaching" (with Cautious Clay and Raedio)	2020	Insecure: Music From The HBO Original Series, Season 4
"Mine" (with Jack Dine)	2020	Non-album single
"Interstellar." (with chromonicci)	2020	Non-album single
"Toroka (Remix)" (with Christian Kuria)	2021	Non-album single
"Good & Plenty (Remix)" (with Lucky Daye, Masego, and Jack Dine)	2021	Non-album single
"At Your Best (You Are Love)"	2021	Spotify Singles
"Remind Me" (with Butcher Brown)	2021	Non-album single
"Fellowship (Remix)" (with Ambré and serpentwithfeet)	2021	Non-album single
"Still Wonder" (with Jack Dine and Robert Glasper)	2021	Marigold
"Love Again" (with Jack Dine)	2021	Marigold
I WANT YOU BUT YOU'LL NEVER KNOW..." (with Rory and DRAM)	2022	I Thought It'd Be Different
"Brown Eyed Girl"(with Ernie Isley)	2023	Non-album single
"Back To Love" (with Robert Glasper and SiR)	2023	Run The World: Season 2 (Music form the STARZ Original Series)
"Paradise"(with Terrace Martin)	2023	I Left My Heart In Ladera
"Same Mistake"(with Destin Conrad)	2024	Non-album single
"Hands"	2025	WHEN & When The City Sleeps
"Ms. Goody Two Shoes"	2025	WHEN & When The City Sleeps
"Fool's Gold - A COLORS SHOW"	2025	WHEN & When The City Sleeps
"Remember Love" (with Eric Benét)	2025	The Co-Star
"Thank You For A Lovely Time - Raphael Saadiq Version"	2025	Non-album single
"JUST A DREAM" (with Isaiah Falls)	2025	LUCKY YOU
"The Christmas Song"	2025	Non-album single
"Sweetest Lullabye"	2026	When The City Sleeps

== Awards and nominations ==
Year	Award	Category	Work	Result
2023	NAACP Image Awards	Outstanding Duo or Group	"Still Believe" (with Jill Scott and PJ Morton)	Nominated
2024	Grammy Awards	Best R&B Performance	"Back to Love" (with Robert Glasper and Sir)	Nominated
2024	Grammy Awards	Best R&B Song	"Back to Love" (with Robert Glasper and Sir)	Nominated
2026	NAACP Image Awards	Outstanding Female Artist	Herself	Nominated
2027	Grammy Awards	Best R&B Album	When the City Sleeps	Pending
