= Hello (Karmin song) =

2012 single by Karmin

Single by Karmin

from the album Hello
- Released: July 31, 2012
- Recorded: 2011
- Genre: Synth-pop; dance-pop; hip hop
- Length: 3:58
- Label: Epic
- Songwriters: Mikkel S. Eriksen; Amy Heidemann; Tor Erik Hermansen; Claude Kelly; Nick Noonan; Autumn Rowe; Krist Novoselic; Dave Grohl
- Producer: Stargate

Karmin singles chronology
"Brokenhearted" (2012)	"Hello" (2012)	"Acapella" (2013)

Music video
- "Hello" on YouTube

"Hello" is a song by American pop recording duo Karmin. The song is the second official single from their debut EP of the same name, Hello.

== Background ==
It was written by band members Amy Heidemann and Nick Noonan, along with production team Stargate, Autumn Rowe and collaborator Claude Kelly. The song began playing on mainstream radio stations July 31, 2012. Hello was the group's second song to top the Hot Dance Club Songs chart after Brokenhearted.

The "Hello, hello, hello" chorus interpolates the same lyrics from Nirvana's "Smells Like Teen Spirit"; the band is given writing credit on the track.

== Music video ==
Karmin shot the music video for "Hello" in the China Town plaza in Los Angeles in June 2012. A forty-second teaser for the video was released on Karmin's official YouTube channel on August 4, 2012. The music video was released to MTV, VH1, and VEVO on August 7, 2012.

== Live performances ==
The duo previewed the song in live acoustic settings on their promotional radio tours in early 2012, as well as recent events like LA Pride 2012, Kansas City Pride 2012, and the "R U on the List" Tour with tour mates Flo Rida, Cee-Lo Green, B.o.B and Kirko Bangz. They also performed the song on 2nd Indonesian Choice Awards.

== Credits and Personnel ==
- Vocals: Karmin
- Songwriting: Mikkel S. Eriksen, Amy Heidemann, Tor Erik Hermansen, Claude Kelly, Nick Noonan, Autumn Rowe
- Production: Stargate

Credits adapted from Hello album liner notes.

== Charts and certifications ==
=== Weekly charts ===
Chart (2012)	Peak position
Australia (ARIA)	72
Canada Hot 100 (Billboard)	72
New Zealand (Recorded Music NZ)	21
US Billboard Hot 100	62
US Adult Pop Airplay (Billboard)	35
US Dance Club Songs (Billboard)	1
US Pop Airplay (Billboard)	16
US Rhythmic Airplay (Billboard)	35

=== Year-end charts ===
Chart (2012)	Position
US Hot Dance Club Songs (Billboard)	17

== Certifications ==
Region	Certification	Certified units/sales
New Zealand (RMNZ)	Gold	7,500^{*}
^{*} Sales figures based on certification alone.

== Release history ==
Country	Date	Format	Label
United States	July 31, 2012	Mainstream radio, digital download	Epic
Taiwan	September 9, 2012	Digital download	Sony Music Taiwan
United Kingdom	December 23, 2012	Digital download	Epic

== See also ==
- List of number-one dance singles of 2012 (U.S.)
