= Leo Rising =

Studio album by Karmin
- Released: September 9, 2016
- Recorded: 2014–16
- Genres: Alternative pop; indie pop
- Labels: Karmin Music; RED
- Producers: Nick Noonan; Steve Tirogene

Karmin chronology
Pulses (2014)	Leo Rising (2016)

Singles from Leo Rising
- 1. "Sugar" Released: October 1, 2014; 2. "Along the Road" Released: March 24, 2015; 3. "Didn't Know You" Released: June 2, 2015; 4. "Come with Me (Pure Imagination)" Released: February 19, 2016; 5. "Sugar (re-release)" Released: April 29, 2016; 6. "Blame It on My Heart" Released: August 5, 2016

Leo Rising is the second and final studio album by American music duo Karmin, released exclusively on Apple Music on September 9, 2016, before being released to all other platforms on September 23, 2016. It is the follow-up to their 2014 major label debut Pulses. Preceding the album's release, five singles were released to promote the album: "Along the Road", "Didn't Know You", "Come with Me (Pure Imagination)", "Sugar", and "Blame It on My Heart".

== Background and concept ==
In preparing for the album's release, husband and wife duo Amy Heidemann-Noonan and Nick Noonan met with an astrologist to understand the signs of the horoscope, drawing inspiration from each of them in writing the album's twelve tracks.

Three tracks, "Yesterday" (previously released as a digital single), "Maybelline" and "Young in Love" were originally slated for the album but did not make the final cut. "Young in Love" was later given to artist Borgeous, who released it as a single in late 2016 featuring vocals from Karmin.

== Singles ==
The first single from Leo Rising, "Sugar", was originally released in October 2014, but has since been amended multiple times with a re-release version of the single impacting radio on April 29, 2016. A new version then appeared on Leo Rising as the album's Taurus track. Three music videos have been released for the single. The couch video was released on October 14, 2014. A teaser for the second music video was released on January 27, 2015, before the video's release on February 28, 2015. A music video for the re-released version of the track was later released on May 16, 2016, and had minor edits made to it.

"Along the Road" was the second single from the album, however was not intended to appear on Leo Rising. Released on March 24, 2015, it appeared on the album after the duo felt that some songs needed to be swapped out for others. It is the Libra track from the album.

"Didn't Know You" (the album's Gemini track) was announced as the lead single from Leo Rising before the track listing's shuffle, and impacted radio on June 2, 2015, along with its release to streaming and purchasing platforms. A music video was released to their Vevo page on July 16, 2015.

"Come with Me (Pure Imagination)" was the fourth single from the album, it was a remix/cover of the song "Pure Imagination" by Gene Wilder from the 1971 film Willy Wonka & the Chocolate Factory. Its music video was released to their YouTube channel shortly after its release before being taken down and uploaded to their Vevo channel on August 19, 2016.

"Blame It on My Heart" was released as the fifth single from the album on August 5, 2016, with its corresponding music video being released on the same day.

=== Promotional singles ===
"Easy Money" (the album's Aquarius track) was released as the first and only promotional single on October 28, 2015.

== Couch videos ==
After the release of the original music video for "Sugar", Karmin came up with the idea to create couch videos to every song from Leo Rising.

The "Sugar" couch video was released on October 14, 2014.

The second, for "Easy Money" was released on September 23, 2016.

"I Got You" (the album's Pisces track) followed on September 24, "Dance with You" (the album's Aries track) on September 25, "Didn't Know You" on September 27, "No Suitcase" (the album's Cancer track) on September 28, "Come with Me (Pure Imagination)" (the album's Leo track) on September 29, "Everything" (the album's Virgo track) on September 30, "Along the Road" (the album's Libra track) on October 1, "Can't Live" (the album's Scorpio track) on October 2, "Blame It on My Heart" (the album's Sagittarius track) on October 3, "Save Me Now" (the album's Capricorn track) on October 4, and the bonus track "Love Is Louder" received a music video rather than a couch video on November 7.

== Commercial performance ==
Leo Rising reached number 27 on the Billboard Independent Albums chart on the week ending October 1, 2016.

== Track listing ==
No.	Title	Writer(s)	Producer(s)	Length
1.	"Dance with You"	Amy Heidemann; Nick Noonan; Jeff Gitelman	Nick Noonan	3:50
2.	"Sugar"	Heidemann; Noonan	Noonan	4:00
3.	"Didn't Know You"	Heidemann; Noonan	Noonan	3:08
4.	"No Suitcase"	Heidemann; Noonan	Noonan	3:36
5.	"Come with Me (Pure Imagination)"	Heidemann; Noonan; Leslie Briscuss; Anthony Newley	Noonan; Steve Tirogene	3:20
6.	"Everything"	Heidemann; Noonan	Noonan	3:24
7.	"Along the Road"	Heidemann; Noonan; Gitelman; Elijah Blake; Hasham Hussein; Denarius Motes	Noonan	3:13
8.	"Can't Live"	Heidemann; Noonan	Noonan	3:47
9.	"Blame It on My Heart"	Heidemann; Noonan	Noonan	3:04
10.	"Save Me Now"	Heidemann; Noonan	Noonan	3:16
11.	"Easy Money"	Heidemann; Noonan; Gitelman	Noonan	3:35
12.	"I Got You"	Heidemann; Noonan	Noonan	3:53
13.	"Love Is Louder" (bonus track)	Heidemann; Noonan	Noonan	3:02
Total length:				45:08

== Charts ==
Chart (2016)	Peak position
US Independent Albums (Billboard)	27
US Top Current Albums (Billboard)	88
