= Hello (Karmin EP) =

EP by Karmin
- Released: May 4, 2012
- Recorded: June–October 2011
- Genres: Dance-pop; pop-rock; hip-hop; R&B
- Length: 24:36 (Standard Edition); 30:12 (iTunes Edition)
- Label: Epic
- Producers: L.A. Reid (exec.); Nils Gums (exec.); Claude Kelly (exec.); Stargate; Tricky Stewart; Cirkut; Jon Jon; Soundz

Karmin chronology
Karmin Covers, Vol. 1 (2011)	Hello (2012)	Pulses (2014)

Singles from Hello
- 1. "Brokenhearted" Released: February 7, 2012; 2. "Hello" Released: July 31, 2012

Hello is an extended play (EP) by pop music duo Karmin. It was released on May 4, 2012 through Epic Records and distributed through Sony Music Entertainment.

== Concept ==
Both Heidemann and Noonan worked to maintain original songs and ideas, while working toward mainstream and pop music. They cited L.A. Reid's understanding of their musical background to be helpful in this process.

== Album title and artwork ==
Through Twitter, the duo revealed that their debut studio album would officially be called HELLO. Heidemann explained to BeatWeek: "We thought it was a perfect title, because it’s our introduction album. When you hear the songs in a row, you’re going to hear our story." The artwork depicts the two band members sitting on the base of a billboard with "Hello" written under them.

== Critical reception ==
Professional ratings
Aggregate scores
Source	Rating
Metacritic	43/100
Review scores
Source	Rating
Allmusic	1.5/5 stars
Rolling Stone	1.5/5 stars

The album was panned by some music critics. Writing in The New York Times, Jon Caramanica critiqued Karmin as an act whose fame came from "assaulting the songs of others, performing glib and highly stylized YouTube covers that inadvertently doubled as sketch comedy" and found Heidemann's rapping in her own material "intricate and deeply irritating". Jody Rosen of Rolling Stone dubbed it "one of the most aggressively obnoxious debut albums in recent memory", with "Brokenhearted", for example, being "catchy" but "Heidemann's daffiness and horrendous rapping spoil[ing] the broth every time".

On the other hand, Gerrick D. Kennedy wrote on the Los Angeles Times music blog: "The disc brims with the swagged-out pop/hip-hop that made [Karmin] YouTube darlings, as collaborators Stargate, Benny Blanco, Tricky Stewart and Dr. Luke deliver slick, radio-ready productions."

The album debuted at #18 on the Billboard 200 and #33 on the Canadian Albums Chart.

== Singles ==
Karmin and Epic released "Brokenhearted" as the first single from Hello, which impacted radio February 7, 2012. It subsequently became their first song to enter Billboard Hot 100, where it peaked at #16. It also reached the #1 spot on Hot Dance Club Play, #12 Pop Digital Songs, and #10 Mainstream Top 40. It was certified as a platinum digital single (1,000,000 unit sales) by the RIAA as announced by Karmin and their management on Twitter and Facebook in early August 2012.

"Hello" impacted radio stations on July 31, 2012 as the EP's second single, which debuted #89 on the Billboard Hot 100, marking their second single to chart in the US. So far, the single is currently peaking at #62 in the US. It is also charting in New Zealand, Australia and in many other countries.

=== Promotional singles ===
"I Told You So" was released as the first and only promotional single on May 9, 2012.

== Track listing ==
Standard edition
No.	Title	Writer(s)	Producer(s)	Length
1.	"Walking on the Moon"	Amy Heidemann; Nick Noonan; Claude Kelly; John Webb Jr.	Jon Jon; Claude Kelly	3:33
2.	"Brokenhearted"	Heidemann; Noonan; Kelly; Emily Wright; Elite; Henry Walter; John Hill	Cirkut; Emily Wright	3:47
3.	"I Told You So"	Heidemann; NoonanWebb; Jr.	Jon Jon	2:48
4.	"Too Many Fish"	Heidemann; Noonan; Christopher Stewart; Rodney Richard; Sean McMillion; Ralph Jeanty	Tricky Stewart; Don Vito*; The Exclusives*	3:18
5.	"I'm Just Sayin'"	Heidemann; Noonan; Webb Jr.	Jon Jon	3:35
6.	"Coming Up Strong"	Heidemann; Noonan; Kenneth Coby	Soundz	3:38
7.	"Hello"	Heidemann; Noonan; Kelly; M.S. Eriksen; T.E. Hermansen; A. Rowe	Stargate	3:57
Total length:				24:36

iTunes bonus tracks
No.	Title	Length
8.	"Brokenhearted" (Mixin Marc & Tony Svejda Club Remix)	5:36
9.	"Brokenhearted" (music video)	3:52

(*) Denotes co-producer

Sample credits

- "Too Many Fish" interpolates "Too Many Fish in the Sea" as performed by The Marvelettes, and written by Norman Whitfield and Eddie Holland.
- "Hello" interpolates "Smells Like Teen Spirit" by Nirvana.

== Charts ==
Chart performance
Chart (2012)	Peak position
Canadian Albums (Nielsen SoundScan)	33
UK Albums (Official Charts)	136
US Billboard 200	18
