= Brokenhearted (Karmin song) =

2012 single by Karmin

Single by Karmin

from the album Hello
- Released: February 7, 2012
- Recorded: 2011
- Genre: Dance-pop; pop rock; hip hop
- Length: 3:50
- Label: Epic
- Songwriters: Amy Heidemann; Nick Noonan; John Hill; Claude Kelly; Henry Walter; Benny Blanco; Emily Wright; Richard Head
- Producers: Cirkut; Emily Wright; Dr. Luke

Karmin singles chronology
"Crash Your Party" (2011)	"Brokenhearted" (2012)	"Hello" (2012)

Music video
- "Brokenhearted" on YouTube

"Brokenhearted" is a song by American pop duo Karmin. It was released as the lead single from their debut EP, Hello (2012). It was written by band members Amy Heidemann and Nick Noonan, Claude Kelly, Benny Blanco, Emily Wright, Henry Walter, John Hill and Richard Head, and produced by Cirkut and Emily Wright. The song is about a woman who begs her lover not to "leave [her] broken hearted tonight". "Brokenhearted" debuted at number 84 on the Billboard Hot 100, and peaked at number 16 on the chart in its twelfth week. Outside of the United States, "Brokenhearted" peaked within the top ten of the charts in Australia, New Zealand, and the United Kingdom.

== Background and composition ==
Written by Amy Heidemann, Nick Noonan, Claude Kelly, Benny Blanco, Emily Wright, Henry Walter, John Hill and Richard Head, produced by Blanco, Cirkut, and Wright, and recorded in the late summer of 2011, the single leaked on January 27, prompting the duo to upload it to their YouTube account on January 30, and was made available for digital download on February 2, officially being released to radio on February 7.

In an interview with Entertainment Weekly, the song's co-writer, Claude Kelly, expressed the goals for the recording, which was one of eight tracks the pair worked on together: "I had the melody down, and I kept feeling I wanted a song that had the vibe of ‘Fantasy’ by Mariah Carey," Kelly explained. "There hasn't been a song like that in a million years, one that's fun and you want to dance to it at a party but it's not so serious that you can't have a good time. And Amy can sing her ass off, so I knew she could do it." It was also mentioned that the song was inspired by Brandy's 1995 single "Brokenhearted".

According to the digital sheet music published at musicnotes.com by EMI Music Publishing, "Brokenhearted" is written in the key of E major with a tempo of 118 beats per minute. Heidemann's vocal range in the song spans from the low note of G♯_{3} to the high note of C♯_{5}.

== Critical reception ==
"Brokenhearted" was well received from critics who complimented Heidemann's vocal prowess and the production's energetic vibe. The Huffington Post noted that despite its somber title, it "certainly has a lot of pep." Grady Smith of Entertainment Weekly calls it a "sunny pop track... which features another dose of Amy’s trademark rapping over a Dr. Luke-esque beat." Andrew Unterberger from Popdust says, "Last year’s "Crash Your Party" was a good start, but "Broken Hearted" faces a much better chance of breaking them through to the Top 40, with a Katy Perry/Dr. Luke style super-pop groove, the first few notes are all but guaranteed to give you "Last Friday Night" flashbacks and a chorus sentiment ("Don't you leave me brokenhearted tonight") that has definite lovelorn-party-anthem potential." MTV's Liz Barker says it may be "the sunniest song to ever bear a title like 'Broken Hearted,'" with a "super-slick flow that Amy shows off."

== Music video ==
=== Background ===
Heidemann and Noonan in a dramatized version of their true story

On February 4, 2012, the group revealed via Twitter that they were in the pre-production phase for an accompanying music video. Filming began on February 6, on location in Los Angeles, California, with additional footage filmed in mid-March. The video was choreographed by Richard Jackson, best known for working with Lady Gaga.

The video is said to be loosely based on how the duo met. It takes place in Amy's apartment, with her recalling the night before. Group member Nick Noonan describes it as "She ran into a guy, who is me. She got along really well, didn’t expect to get along with somebody like that, then at the end of the night they exchanged numbers. The whole song is ‘Why didn’t you call me? Don’t leave me brokenhearted.’ She's never really felt like this, she's confused, she's anxious. You think this guy might be a jerk, but then at the very end you figure out why he didn't call." The 'cheerio' part in the song came about when Claude Kelly wanted to add a little personality to the song: he asked Amy, what would she say if she was pacing around her apartment waiting for a guy to call you, she said 'Cheerio' and "it just stuck!"

=== Synopsis ===
The video was directed by Marc Klasfeld. The video was released on Vevo on March 22, 2012. The story shifts back and forth between the previous day and the present day. The video starts out with Amy entering the studio late as the band is already in mid-rehearsal, and her bandmates give her concerned looks as to why she seems so out of it, while Amy starts shedding her outdoor garbs to loosen up. She sits down on her bed and trades her discomforting heels for the comfort of throw rugs under her bare feet, grabbing hold of her mic stand and flashing her band a reassuring gesture. They begin to perform "Brokenhearted". The night before, Amy, Nick, their band members and other friends party in an apartment, complete with drinking, dancing, a game of darts and table tennis. Amy thinks she and Nick are romantically connected. The next morning, Amy furiously checks her phone to see if Nick has called, but he hasn't. At the end of band rehearsals, it turns out that Nick is already seeing someone else.

== Live performances ==
The band debuted their live televised performance on Saturday Night Live on February 11, 2012. The band continued a promotional push for the single by appearing and performing the song on VH1 Big Morning Buzz Live, and also announcing that the release date for the album was set for May 8, 2012. In May 2015, they performed the song on 2nd Indonesian Choice Awards.

== Credits and personnel ==
Credits adapted from Hello album liner notes.

- Vocals – Karmin
- Songwriting – Karmin, John Hill, Claude Kelly, Benny Blanco, Henry Walter, Emily Wright, Richard Head
- Production – Benny Blanco, Cirkut, Emily Wright, Dr. Luke (as Richard Head)

== Track listing ==
Digital download

1. "Brokenhearted" – 3:47

Digital remixes

1. "Brokenhearted (R3hab Remix Extended)" – 4:46
2. "Brokenhearted (Mixin Marc & Tony Svejda Club Remix)" – 5:36
3. "Brokenhearted (Mixin Marc & Tony Svejda Radio Mix)" – 3:56
4. "Brokenhearted (Mixin Marc & Tony Svejda Poppin' Bottles Remix)" – 6:27
5. "Brokenhearted (Razor N Guido Main Mix)" – 7:40
6. "Brokenhearted (Razor N Guido Mixshow)" – 5:39
7. "Brokenhearted (Razor N Guido Radio Edit)" – 4:03
8. "Brokenhearted (Razor N Guido Dub)" – 4:03
9. "Brokenhearted (RNG DuHb)" – 7:10

UK Digital EP

1. "Brokenhearted" – 3:47
2. "Brokenhearted (R3hab Remix Edit)" – 3:25
3. "Brokenhearted (Mixin Marc & Tony Svejda Radio Mix)" – 3:56
4. "Brokenhearted (RNG Dub)" – 7:10

== Charts ==
=== Weekly charts ===
Chart (2012)	Peak position
Australia (ARIA)	9
Belgium (Ultratip Bubbling Under Flanders)	61
Canada Hot 100 (Billboard)	19
Czech Republic Airplay (ČNS IFPI)	48
Ireland (IRMA)	40
New Zealand (Recorded Music NZ)	5
Scotland Singles (OCC)	3
UK Singles (OCC)	6
US Billboard Hot 100	16
US Adult Contemporary (Billboard)	17
US Adult Pop Airplay (Billboard)	9
US Dance Club Songs (Billboard)	1
US Dance/Mix Show Airplay (Billboard)	11
US Pop Airplay (Billboard)	10

=== Year-end charts ===
Chart (2012)	Position
Australia (ARIA)	97
Canada (Canadian Hot 100)	47
UK Singles (Official Charts Company)	149
US Billboard Hot 100	59
US Adult Contemporary (Billboard)	46
US Adult Top 40 (Billboard)	40
US Dance Club Songs (Billboard)	14
US Dance/Mix Show Airplay (Billboard)	44
US Mainstream Top 40 (Billboard)	41

== Certifications ==
Region	Certification	Certified units/sales
Australia (ARIA)	2× Platinum	140,000^{^}
Canada (Music Canada)	Platinum	80,000^{*}
New Zealand (RMNZ)	Platinum	15,000^{*}
United Kingdom (BPI)	Silver	200,000^{‡}
United States (RIAA)	Platinum	1,000,000^{*}
Streaming
Denmark (IFPI Danmark)	Gold	900,000^{†}
^{*} Sales figures based on certification alone.^{^} Shipments figures based on certification alone.^{‡} Sales+streaming figures based on certification alone.^{†} Streaming-only figures based on certification alone.

== Release history ==
Country	Date	Format	Label
United States	February 14, 2012	Mainstream airplay	Epic
Worldwide	May 27, 2012	Digital download	Sony Music Taiwan

== See also ==
- List of number-one dance singles of 2012 (U.S.)
