= Pulses (Karmin album) =

Studio album by Karmin
- Released: March 25, 2014
- Recorded: 2012–2014
- Genres: Pop; EDM; hip-hop
- Length: 42:48
- Label: Epic

Karmin chronology
Hello (2012)	Pulses (2014)	Leo Rising (2016)

Singles from Pulses
- 1. "Acapella" Released: July 9, 2013; 2. "I Want It All" Released: January 28, 2014

Pulses is the debut full-length studio album by American musical duo Karmin, released on March 25, 2014, by Epic Records.

== Release and promotion ==
In August 2012, Karmin announced they were recording a full-length album, set to be released in November of the same year. The album was then delayed until Summer 2013, but was still not finished. They released the single "Acapella" in early July, stating that the album would follow in September. In August 2013, Dasani featured the song "Try Me On" in its commercials for Dasani Drops. On September 18, 2013, during a live concert on StageIt, Karmin shared that the album is finished, but they are feuding with their label, Epic Records, and are struggling to settle on a second single and a release date for the full record.

In October, the album became available for pre-order at the Walmart website. The album was expected to be released on December 31, 2013, but this was later denied by their manager. Pulses also became available for pre-order on iTunes on February 25, 2014.

=== Singles ===
Karmin released "Acapella" as the first single from Pulses. It premiered on the radio in June 2013. It peaked at number 72 on the Billboard Hot 100, number 9 in New Zealand, and at 4 in Australia, making it their highest charting single in the latter country.

"I Want It All" was chosen as the album's second single in late 2013, and was released on January 28, 2014. The music video premiered on Vevo on February 21, 2014.

"Pulses" is the title track as well as a promotional single from the album. The music video for the single was premiered on a live Google hangout that Karmin hosted. The Music video was released on the 18th March 2014 on Youtube via Karmin's Vevo channel. The song presents Amy rapping and singing as well as Nick singing. The track was produced by Jon Jon, who previously produced "I Told You So", "I'm Just Sayin'" and "Walking on the Moon" from their previous EP Hello.

== Critical reception ==
Professional ratings
Review scores
Source	Rating
AllMusic	2/5 stars
Knoxville News Sentinel	3/5 stars
Rolling Stone	1.5/5 stars
USA Today	2.5/4 stars

Pulses garnered generally mixed reviews from music critics. At USA Today, Brian Mansfield rated the album two-and-a-half stars out of four, writing that on the release the duo "prove to be better at tweaking pop parameters than redefining them." Stephen Thomas Erlewine of AllMusic rated the album two stars out of five, saying that the duo "seem far away from the jokey upstarts that swept the digital nation in 2011, and that's the problem: these are fun songs but they could've been by anybody. It doesn't matter that they're from a Karmin that no longer look or sound like Karmin." At Rolling Stone, Julianne Escobedo Shepherd rated the album one-and-a-half stars out of five, stating that the duo has a "goofy shtick [that] is to decontextualize sounds from other genres until they're utterly meaningless." In addition, Escobedo Shepherd says that "If it all burns down, maybe we deserve it." Ken Capobianco of The Boston Globe gave a negative review of the album, writing that "The result is a record with zero vision or identity" because "Of course many pop thrills are ephemeral, but this is a weightless collection filled with numerous trite lyrics (intentionally campy?) and melodic ideas nicked from better dance, hip-pop, or retro new-wave sources." At Knoxville News Sentinel, Chuck Campbell rated the album three stars out of five, stating that even though "Most individual tracks have something going for them, but as a whole, the contrived nature of the arrangements takes its toll, and 'Pulses' loses its overall appeal."

== Commercial performance ==
Pulses debuted and peaked at number 46 in Australia for the week commencing April 7, 2014.

== Track listing ==
The track listing was confirmed on February 21, 2014.

No.	Title	Writer(s)	Producer(s)	Length
1.	"Geronimo Intro"	Amy Heidemann; Nick Noonan; Claude Kelly; James G. Morales; Matt Morales; Julio David Rodriguez	The Elev3n	0:41
2.	"Pulses"	Heidemann; Noonan; John Webb Jr.	Jon Jon	3:24
3.	"Acapella"	Heidemann; Noonan; Sam Hollander; Martin Johnson	Johnson	3:19
4.	"I Want It All"	Heidemann; Noonan; Ester Dean; Ryan Williamson	Ryan Williamson	3:47
5.	"Night Like This"	Heidemann; Noonan; Kyle Shearer; Kelly; Emily Wright	Robert Marvin; Shearer	3:02
6.	"Neon Love"	Heidemann; Noonan; Johnson	Johnson	4:27
7.	"Drifter"	Heidemann; Noonan; Webb Jr.; Anders Froen	Jon Jon	3:14
8.	"Tidal Wave"	Heidemann; Noonan; Andrew Hershey; Laura Pergolizzi	Dre Skull	3:48
9.	"Gasoline"	Heidemann; Noonan; Shearer; Emily Warren	Marvin; Shearer	3:38
10.	"Puppet"	Heidemann; Noonan; Nathaniel Motte, Sean Foreman	Nathaniel Motte	3:13
11.	"Hate to Love You"	Heidemann; Noonan; Morales; Morales; Rodriguez	The Elev3n	3:36
12.	"Try Me On"	Heidemann; Noonan; Nasri Atweh; Adam Messinger; Nolan Lambroza	The Messengers, Sir Nolan	3:16
13.	"What's in It for Me"	Heidemann; Noonan; Morales; Morales; Rodriguez	The Elev3n	3:32
Total length:				42:48

== Charts ==
Chart (2014)	Peak position
Australian Albums (ARIA)	46
US Billboard 200	32

== Release history ==
Region	Date	Format(s)	Label	Ref.
Canada	March 25, 2014	CD; digital download	Epic	
United States	March 25, 2014	CD; digital download	Epic	
Australia	March 28, 2014	CD; digital download	Epic	
