= Karmin =

American pop duo

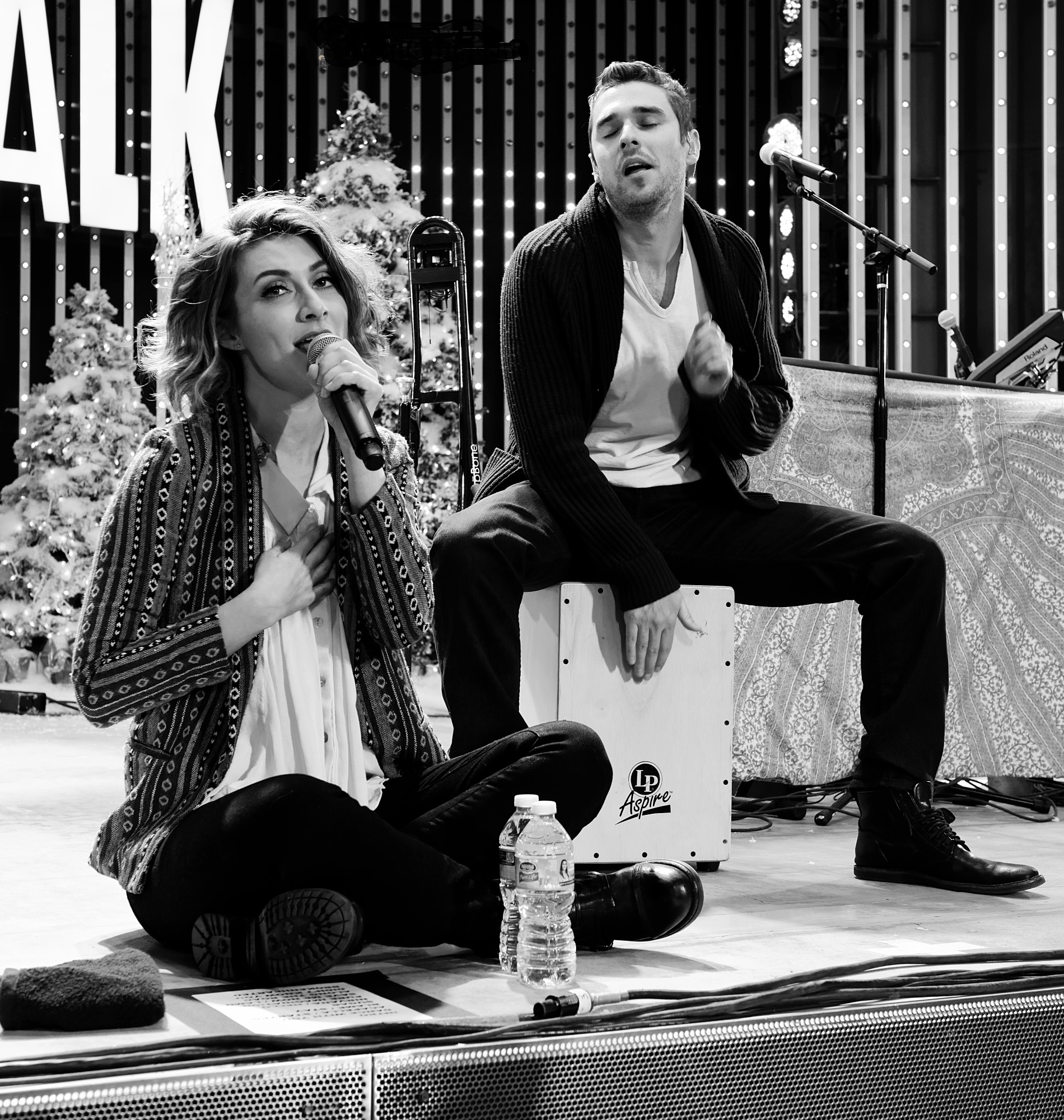
- Karmin in 2015

Background information
- Origin: Boston, Massachusetts, U.S.
- Genres: Pop; hip hop; pop-rap
- Years active: 2007–2017
- Labels: Epic; RED
- Past members: Amy Renee Noonan; Nick Noonan

Karmin were an American pop duo consisting of Nick and Amy Renee Noonan. Starting as a novelty act that released covers on YouTube, they signed in 2011 with Epic Records. In May 2012, Karmin released their debut EP Hello, which spawned the singles "Brokenhearted" and "Hello", and received mixed reviews. "Brokenhearted" reached the top 10 in the United Kingdom, Australia, and New Zealand, as well as the top 20 in the United States and Canada. Rolling Stone named Karmin's lead singer Amy as the winner of "Women Who Rock" 2012 contests. In March 2014, the duo released their debut album, Pulses. The album's lead single, "Acapella", charted in the top 10 in Australia and New Zealand, and went Gold in the United States, Canada, and New Zealand. They left Epic Records in the middle of 2014 and have since released music independently. Their second album Leo Rising was released on September 9, 2016.

In 2017, the duo disbanded Karmin to focus on Qveen Herby, Amy Noonan's alter ego. The project moves away from pop in favor of more of an R&B and hip-hop/rap sound.

== Life and career ==
=== Early life and career beginnings ===
Amy Heidemann and Nick Noonan met while attending Berklee College of Music in Boston, from which they graduated in 2008. Heidemann is a graduate of Seward High School in Seward, Nebraska. Noonan graduated from Old Town High School in Old Town, Maine, where he was a member of the concert band and jazz ensemble. The duo has also been a couple since September 2005 and in March 2016 confirmed that they had married. That month, Amy changed her Twitter name from "Amy Heidemann" to "Amy Noonan".

The duo's popularity grew due to exposure on YouTube, achieving more than 320 million views between two channels. The name of the band is an American-accented homophone made from the Latin word carmen meaning "song" (also a Spanish female name), and the word karma, making the name Karmin.

=== Music career ===
Karmin signed with Epic Records, and in late June 2011 entered the studio to record their debut studio EP, Hello, which was released on May 7 via digital download.

Karmin performed as the musical guest on Saturday Night Live on February 11, 2012, singing "Brokenhearted" and "I Told You So". Their performance received multiple negative reviews from critics, with USA Today ranking it among the worst musical acts on SNL in the 21st century.

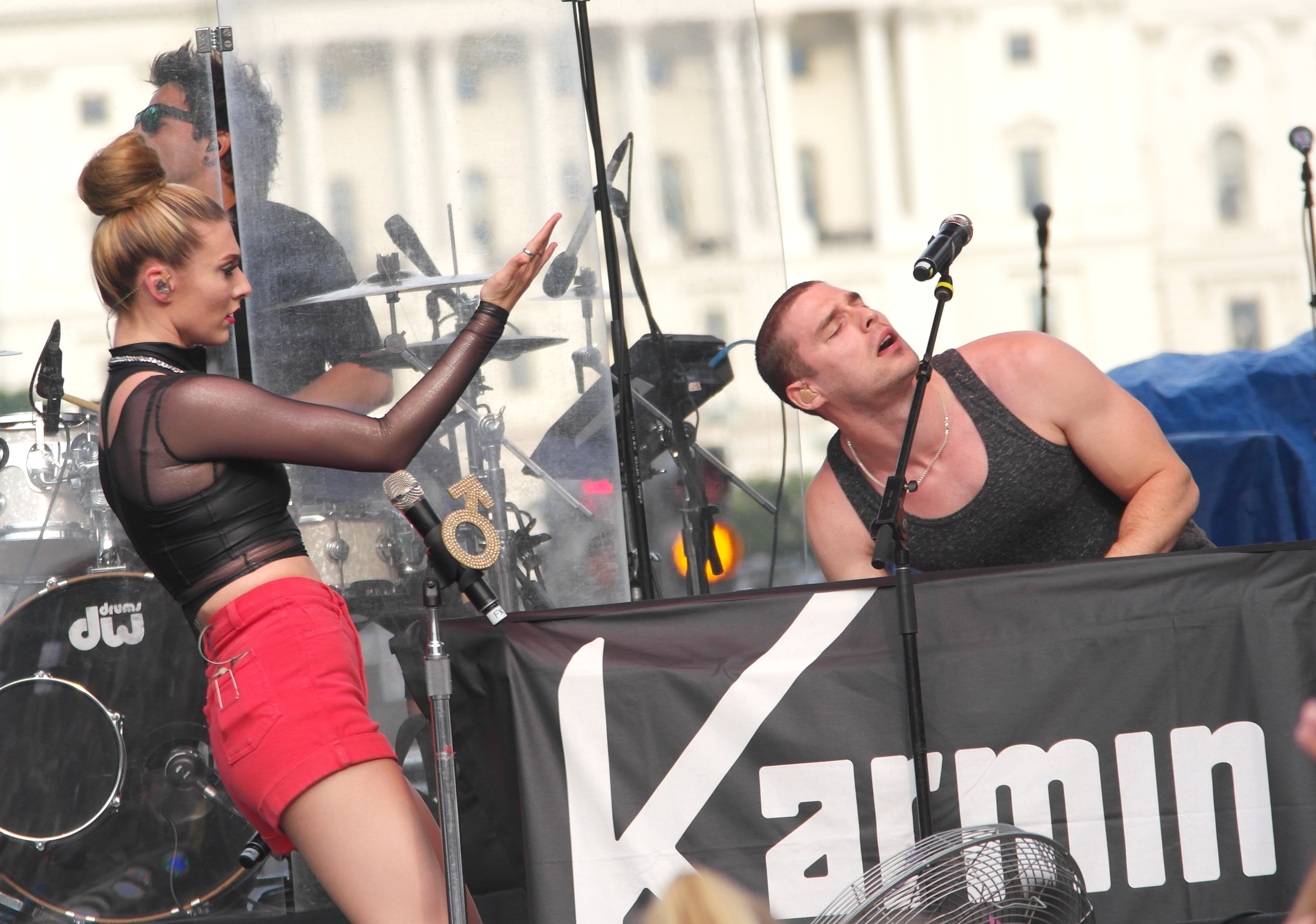
Karmin performing as a headliner at the 2014 Capital Pride Festival

On February 26, 2013, the duo released a studio cover of Drake's song "Started from the Bottom" as a promotional single; a week later they also released a mash-up studio cover for "Karate Chop/Sweet Dreams" by Future also as a promotional single. They released the single digitally for free download. The single "Acapella" was released in July and debuted at number 98 on the US Billboard Hot 100 and two weeks later peaked at number 72.

On October 28, 2013, they announced their 2014 Pulses tour, and released the full-length album Pulses on March 25, 2014; Rolling Stone gave it 1–1/2 stars.

=== 2014–2016: Split from Epic Records and Leo Rising ===
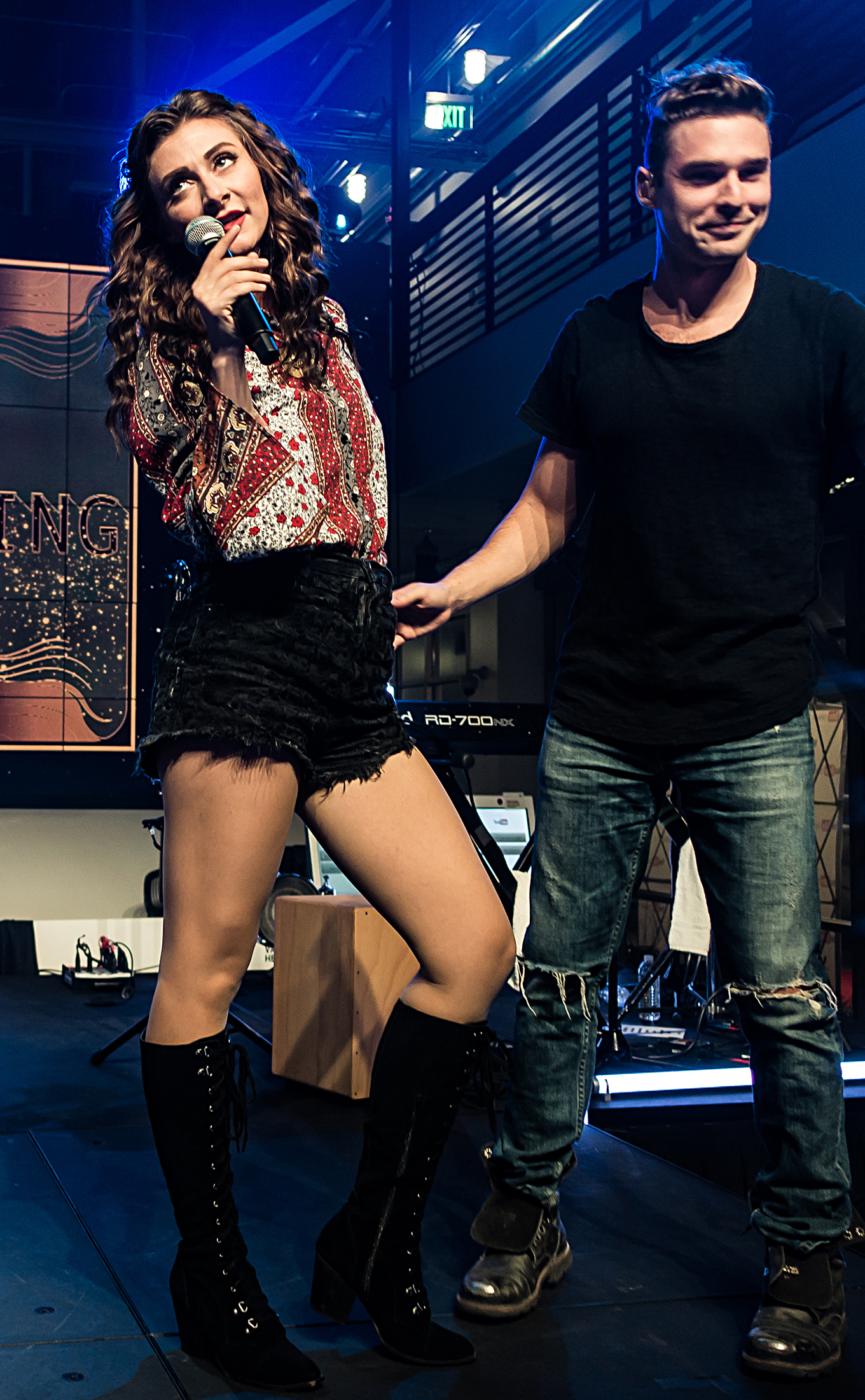
Performing at the Leo Rising showcase.

In 2014, after the release of their debut album Pulses and the attendant tour, Karmin left Epic Records. In an interview with Billboard, Heidemann said: "We were hungry to try a more musically honest approach. We wanted to be a little bit nerdier than we think they had hoped". Six months after the release of Pulses, in September 2014, Karmin released a single with rapper George Watsky titled "No Flex Zone (Remix)", inspired by the song "No Flex Zone" by Rae Sremmurd. It was produced by Nick Noonan. Later that year, Karmin began work on their second album, Leo Rising. Two digital singles were released in 2014: "Sugar" on October 8, followed by "Yesterday" on October 24, 2014. Another single "Along the Road" was released on March 25, 2015, and was slated to be the lead single off the project, was later relegated as a promotional release.

In 2016, Wild Culture released the Sugar EP in collaboration with Karmin. It features three remixes of "Sugar" and a remix of Riley Pearce's single "Brave". The album Leo Rising was released on September 9, 2016.

=== 2017–present: Qveen Herby ===
At the beginning of 2017, Amy Noonan revealed in a livestream that a Leo Rising tour would not be held in 2017, and if there was one it would be in 2018. She also revealed that alongside the launch of a new website, new music was in the works.

In 2017, all of Karmin's social media was rebranded to Qveen Herby and a small preview stating "Karmin Is Dead, Long Live the Queen" was posted. Noonan soon formally announced her solo career and launched the website Qveenherby.com. The music video for Qveen Herby's first single "Busta Rhymes" was released on June 1, 2017, followed by the release of EP 1 a day later. The EP received positive reviews from critics, who praised Herby's rebranding as an artist and the exploration of R&B and hip hop music. The EP also experienced fair success, peaking at number 37 on the US Billboard Independent Albums Chart and 13 on the US Heatseekers Albums chart.

== Discography ==
- Pulses (2014)
- Leo Rising (2016)

== Awards and nominations ==
Year	Nominated work	Award	Nomination	Result
2011	Karmin	American Music Award	New Media Honoree	Won
2012	Karmin	MTV O Music Awards	Web Born Star	Won
2012	Karmin	Teen Choice Awards	Breakout Group	Won
2012	Karmin	Teen Choice Awards	Web Star	Nominated
2012	Karmin	PopRepublic It List Awards	Breakthrough Artist	Won
2012	Karmin	PopRepublic It List Awards	Best Intl Group	Nominated
2012	"Brokenhearted"	PopRepublic It List Awards	Best Single	Won
2012	Hello	PopRepublic It List Awards	Best Album	Nominated
2014	Karmin	World Music Awards	World's Best Group	Nominated
2014	Karmin	World Music Awards	World's Best Live Act	Nominated
2014	"Acapella"	World Music Awards	World's Best Song	Nominated
2014	"Acapella"	World Music Awards	World's Best Video	Nominated
2016	Amy Heidemann	She Rocks Awards	2016 Mad Skills Award	Won
