= Discordance Axis =

American grindcore band

- Also known as: Sedition (1991)
- Origin: East Brunswick, New Jersey, US
- Genres: Grindcore, mathcore
- Years active: 1991–2001
- Labels: Devour; HG Fact; Hydra Head; Pulp; Slap a Ham; Willowtip
- Past members: Jon Chang; Rob Marton; Dave Witte; Steve Procopio; Rob Proctor
- Website: studio-grey.com/da/

Discordance Axis was an American grindcore band formed in 1991 in East Brunswick, New Jersey. Their songs employed themes of inner struggles, science fiction, comic books, anime, and literature.

== History ==
Discordance Axis was originally formed in 1991 by Jon Chang under the name of Sedition, after recruiting guitarist Rob Marton and drummer Dave Witte. The band didn't have a bassist, however, and would change their name to Discordance Axis in 1992. The band commonly avoided photographs and live performances. Steve Procopio played with the band live on a few occasions and recorded guitar on the Necropolitan EP (1997). In 2000, the band released their third and final album, The Inalienable Dreamless, which was acclaimed.

In April 2001, Discordance Axis announced that Rob Marton would be leaving the band due to severe ear damage, resulting in their breakup. The band played their final show at CBGB on May 13, 2001, with Procopio filling in on guitar. Following their disbandment, Chang formed Gridlink in 2004, whilst Witte would become known for his role as a drummer in other bands such as Human Remains, Black Army Jacket, Burnt by the Sun and Municipal Waste. In 2019, Chang and Marton reunited in the band No One Knows What the Dead Think, who released their first and only album in September 2019 through Willowtip Records.

== Style ==
In the beginning, the band played straightforward grindcore influenced by acts such as Napalm Death, to the point Seth Putnam of fellow grindcore band Anal Cunt jokingly accused them of plagiarism in their song "Stealing Seth's Ideas" the New Book by Jon Chang off the album Top 40 Hits. However, later releases showcased a more original style. Robert Marton guitar lines were both technical and dissonant, and added creative overdubs to augment the melodies. Dave Witte added complex rolls, fills, and jarring rhythmic shifts to the usual barrage of blast beats found in grindcore. Jon Chang alternated between a shrill shriek and a "gastrointestinal" roar, and based most of his metaphorical lyrics on novels and anime. The band had no bassist, and the majority of their full-length recordings were released in DVD cases rather than CD cases, accompanied by unusually large booklets with long liner notes for each song, usually longer than the lyrics.

== Members ==
=== Current members ===
- Jon Chang – vocals (Gridlink, Hayaino Daisuki, No One Knows What the Dead Think)
- Rob Marton – guitar (No One Knows What the Dead Think)
- Dave Witte – drums (Burnt by the Sun, Human Remains, Municipal Waste, Black Army Jacket, Melt-Banana, Exit-13, Deny the Cross, Hope Collapse, East West Blast Test, Birds of Prey, Phantomsmasher)

=== Former members ===
- Steve Procopio – guitar (1997–1998, 2001)
- Rob Proctor – drums (1995)

== Discography ==
=== Studio albums ===
- Ulterior (1995), Devour Records/Pulp Records
- Jouhou (1997), Hydra Head Records
- The Inalienable Dreamless (2000), Hydra Head Records

=== EPs ===
- split with Cosmic Hurse (1992), Pulp Records
- split with Hellchild (1993), HG Fact
- split with Capitalist Casualties (1994), Pulp Records
- split with Def Master (1994), HG Fact
- split with Melt-Banana (1995), HG Fact
- split with Plutocracy (1995), Slap a Ham Records
- Necropolitan (1997), HG Fact
- split with Corrupted and 324 (2001), HG Fact

=== Compilations ===
- Original Sound Version 1992–1995 (1998), Devour Records
- The Inalienable Dreamless Perfect Version Box Set (2000), self-released
- Our Last Day (2005), Hydra Head Records

=== Videos ===
- 7.62mm (1997), self-released
- Pikadourei (2002), Hydra Head Records
