= Dave Witte =

American drummer

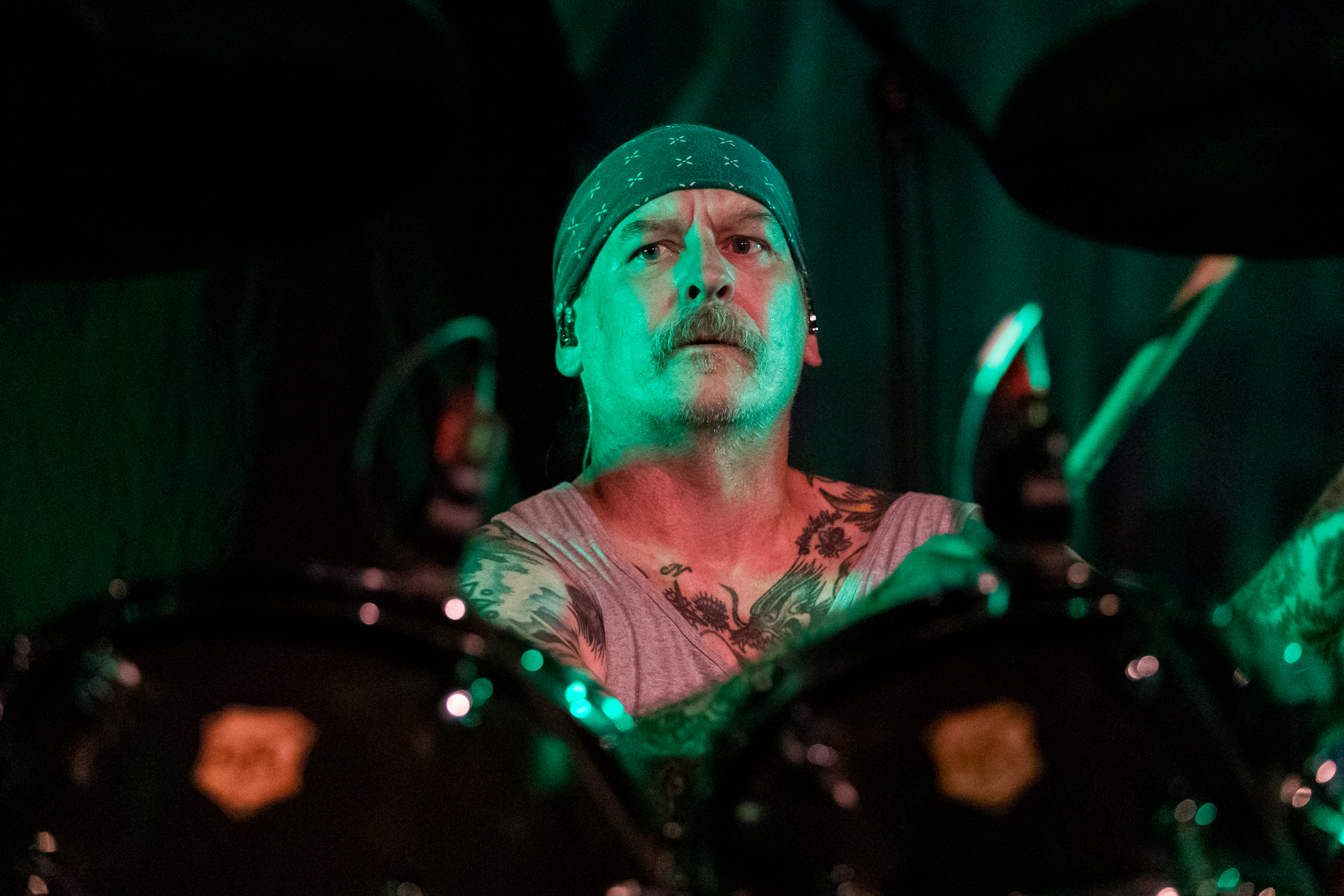
- Witte performing with Municipal Waste in 2024

Background information
- Born: August 11, 1971 (age 55)
- Origin: New Jersey, United States
- Genres: Extreme metal, heavy metal, hardcore punk
- Occupation: Musician
- Instruments: Drums, percussion
- Years active: 1990–present
- Labels: Pulp, H.G. Fact, Slap-a-Ham, Relapse, Devour, Hydra Head, Earache, Ipecac, Tankcrimes, Nuclear Blast
- Member of: Municipal Waste, Deny the Cross, Birds of Prey, Brain Tentacles
- Formerly of: Human Remains, Discordance Axis, Black Army Jacket, East West Blast Test, Phantomsmasher, Burnt by the Sun, Melt-Banana
- Website: blog.davewitte.com

Dave Witte (born August 11, 1971) is an American drummer. He is known for his work in numerous extreme metal or hardcore punk bands including Municipal Waste, Melt-Banana, Discordance Axis, Black Army Jacket, Birds of Prey, Burnt by the Sun, and Deny the Cross among others. He has also played as a session drummer for many other acts.

== Early life ==
Witte is a New Jersey native. He relocated to Richmond, Virginia to join Municipal Waste. He has been the drummer on numerous albums since 1990. He plays many styles of drumming while retaining heavy aspects of music in all his projects. Witte was introduced to drumming in grade school by his Uncle Victor. Before he graduated high school he was studying many performances, and had already formed his first band, Human Remains.

== Drumming ==
Witte often plays with multiple bands at once. He is a drummer in the underground scene. Witte says he "loves the speed aspect of drumming". Witte plays SJC drums, Paiste cymbals, and Vic Firth drumsticks.

== Bands ==
Witte has been in numerous bands since the early 1990s. He has never been in just one band, and he has been in up to five or six bands at once. He has recorded many studio albums with bands, toured with many other bands, or formed his own bands always keeping busy playing music.

=== Current bands ===
==== Municipal Waste (2004–present) ====
Witte joined Municipal Waste in 2004, after previous drummer Brandon Ferrel left the band. In 2005 Municipal Waste released their first album with Witte on drums, Hazardous Mutation. Since then they have released Massive Aggressive in 2009. Their album, The Fatal Feast came out in 2012. According to Witte Massive Aggressive is the best album the band has done to date.

==== Burnt by the Sun (1999–2009) ====
Witte formed Burnt By the Sun in 1999 along with friend John Adubato. Witte's reason for forming the band was because he was tired of buying records "that failed to deliver what they promised" so they formed their own style of metal using what Witte and the other members felt were missing from heavy music. The band released a demo on Ferret records. After the demo they released several albums on Relapse Records. After a hiatus Witte claimed it was time to make a third record, but stated the band "can not and will not be full-time". He also stated this will be the last release from Burnt by the Sun.

==== Deny the Cross (2013–present) ====
Formed in 2013 by Witte, vocalist Carlos Ramirez, guitarist Dan Lactose, and bassist Ramon Salcido, Deny the Cross is powerviolence band that released their debut album, Alpha Ghoul, in 2016, via Tankcrimes. In addition to Witte, Deny the Cross' members have also been in such bands as Spazz, Agents of Satan, Black Army Jacket, Plutocracy, Funeral Shock, and Lakota.

=== Past bands ===
Witte toured with Melt-Banana for four years.

Witte's second band, Discordance Axis, that gained much critical attention after the band had broken up.

- Human Remains

This was Witte's first band.

- Exit-13
- Black Army Jacket

A NYC-based powerviolence band that released one studio album, and a slew of EPs and compilation tracks.

Witte has also collaborated with numerous artists to create:

- Hex Machine
- Candria
- Redrum
- Major-burns
- Atomsmasher
- Phantomsmasher
- Anodyne
- East West Blast Test
- Hope Collapse

Witte also rehearsed with Pig Destroyer with the intention of joining the band following the departure of drummer Brian Harvey but was forced to back out due to a pre-existing wrist injury. Material was written for the band's upcoming album with Witte.

== Personal life ==
On his off-time from recording and touring Witte works in the kitchen of a catering company. Since 2017 he runs, together with his girlfriend, a vegan foodtruck. He is a self-proclaimed beer lover, with Belgian beers being his favorite. He also finished his first triathlon in 2003.

== Discography ==
Anodyne

- Red Was Her Favorite Color (2001, Happy Couples Never Last Records)
- The First Four Years (2004, Blackbox Recordings)

Atomsmasher

- Atomsmasher (2001, Hydrahead Records)

Birds of Prey

- Weight of the Wound (2006, Relapse Records)
- The Hellpreacher (2009, Relapse Records)

Black Army Jacket

- Black Army Jacket/Agathocles (1998, Deaf American Recordings)
- 222 (1999, Chainsaw Safety Records)
- Closed Casket (2004, Blackbox Recordings)

Burnt by the Sun

- Burnt by the Sun/Luddite Clone (2000, Ferret Records)
- Burnt by the Sun EP (2002, Relapse Records)
- Soundtrack to the Personal Revolution (2002, Relapse Records)
- The Perfect Is the Enemy of the Good (2003, Relapse Records)
- Live from the Relapse Contamination Festival (2003, Relapse Records)
- Burnt by the Sun/Car Bomb Split (2007, Relapse Records)
- Heart of Darkness (2009, Relapse Records)

Candiria

- Beyond Reasonable Doubt (1997, Too Damn Hype Records)

Deny the Cross

- Alpha Ghoul (2016, Tankcrimes)

Discordance Axis

- Discordance Axis/Cosmic Hurse (1992, Pulp Records)
- Discordance Axis/Hellchild (1993, H.G.Fact Records)
- V/A World H.C. Compilation (1993, Discrete Records)
- Discordance Axis/Capitalist Casualties (1994, Pulp Records)
- Discordance Axis/Def Master (1994, H.G. Fact Records)
- Ulterior(1995, Devour Records)
- Discordance Axis/Putocracy (1995, Slap A Ham Records)
- Discordance Axis/Melt Banana (1995, H.G. Fact Records)
- V/A Oh Great Blue Thing Compilation (1996, Oh Great Blue Thing Records)
- Jouhou (1997, Devour Records)
- Necropolitan (1997, H.G. Fact Records)
- The Inalienable Dreamless (2000, Hydrahead Records)
- Discordanace Axis/Corrupted/324 (2001, H.G. Fact Records)
- Our Last Day (2005, Hydrahead Records)

East West Blast Test

- East West Blast Test (2000, Slap A Ham Records)
- Popular Music for Unpopular People (2006, Ipecac Recordings)

Exit-13

- Exit-13/Hemdale (1995, Visceral Productions)
- Exit-13/Multiplex (1996, H.G. Fact Records)

Hex Machine

- Hex Machine (2006, Relapse Records)

Hope Collapse

- Year of The Leper (2005, Inkblot Records)

Human Remains

- Demo (1990)
- Demo (1991)
- Admiration Most Deep and Foul (1992, Cenotaph Records)
- Spoint of Beauty V/A Midnight Offerings (1992, With Your Teeth Records)
- Patterns in the Grass (1995, Happy Days Records)
- Using Sickness as a Hero (1996, Relapse Records)
- Where Were You When Discography (2002, Relapse Records)

King Generator

- King Generator (2008, Tankcrimes)

Major Burns

- Korea (1999, Now or Never Records)

Melt-Banana

- Peel Session (2001, Unreleased)

No Faith

- Forced Subservience (2017, Iron Lung Records)

Phantomsmasher

- Phantomsmasher (2002, Ipecac Recordings)

Redrum

- Ghettoblaster (1997, Antichrist Propaganda)

Municipal Waste

- Hazardous Mutation (2005, Earache Records)
- The Art of Partying (2007, Earache Records)
- Massive Aggressive (2009, Earache Records)
- Toxic Waste split w/ Toxic Holocaust (2012, Tankcrimes)
- The Fatal Feast (2012, Nuclear Blast)
- Slime and Punishment (2017, Nuclear Blast)
- Electrified Brain (2022, Nuclear Blast)

Circle of Animals

- Destroy the Light (2010, Relapse Records)
