= Deny the Cross =

American powerviolence band

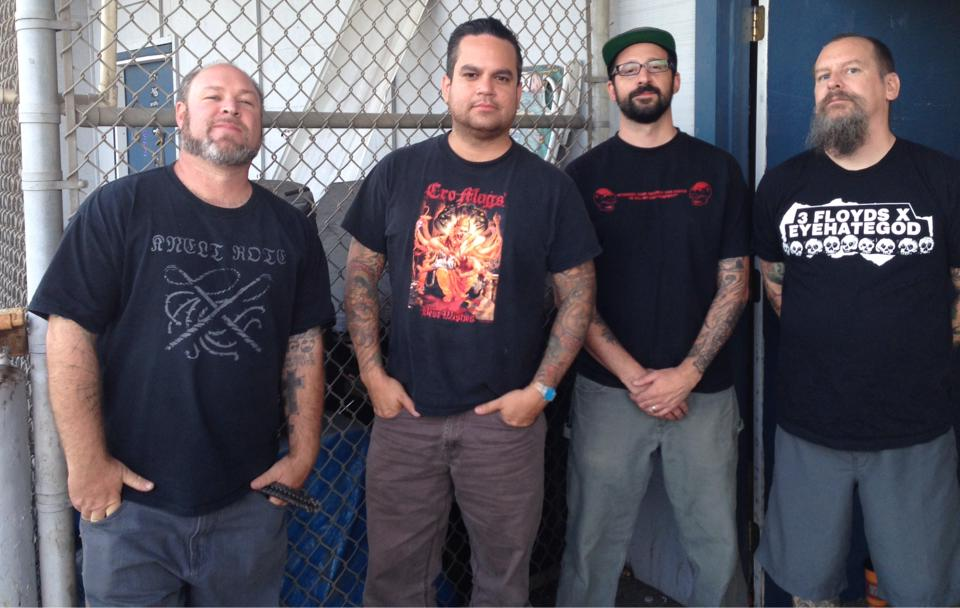

Background information
- Origin: United States
- Genres: Powerviolence, grindcore
- Years active: 2013-Present
- Label: Tankcrimes
- Members: Carlos Ramirez - vocals Dan Lactose - guitar Ramon Salcido - bass Dave Witte - drums
- Website: Official Facebook Page

Deny the Cross is an American powerviolence band. Founded in 2013, the group features drummer Dave Witte (Municipal Waste, Discordance Axis, Burnt by the Sun), vocalist Carlos Ramirez (Black Army Jacket), guitarist Dan Lactose (Spazz), and bassist Ramon Salcido (Agents of Satan, Plutocracy).

Signed to the Tankcrimes label, Deny the Cross released its debut album, Alpha Ghoul, on June 29, 2016. The album was partly recorded by Brainoil vocalist/bassist Greg Wilkinson at Earhammer Studios in Oakland, California. Former Charles Bronson vocalist Mark McCoy created the album’s artwork and layout.

Alpha Ghoul premiered as an exclusive album stream at Vice’s Noisey.com a few days before its official release.

Deny the Cross vocalist Carlos Ramirez also is the co-owner of No Echo, a music website.

== Discography ==
- Alpha Ghoul (2016, Tankcrimes)
