= Slime and Punishment =

Studio album by Municipal Waste
- Released: June 23, 2017
- Studios: Blaze of Torment Studios; Richmond, Virginia, U.S.
- Genre: Crossover thrash
- Length: 28:44
- Label: Nuclear Blast
- Producer: Municipal Waste

Municipal Waste chronology
The Fatal Feast (2012)	Slime and Punishment (2017)	Electrified Brain (2022)

Singles from Slime and Punishment
- 1. "Amateur Sketch" Released: April 27, 2017; 2. "Slime and Punishment" Released: May 25, 2017

Slime and Punishment is the sixth studio album by American crossover thrash band Municipal Waste, released on June 23, 2017. It the first album to feature guitarist Nick Poulos.

== Overview ==
Slim and Punishment was Municipal Wastes first album in five years marking their longest gab in between album releases. In an interview lead singer Tony Foresta explained the extended break between albums: "We just had so many records out already and we have a lot of songs on those records because we don't write really long songs so we just kind of felt like the world wasn't ready yet for a sixth Municipal Waste album. So we had to let it rest for a few years and kind of do our own projects and hang out at home and just be ourselves for a while. And it finally just felt like the right time to do a new record — and I think people wanted it."

It is the bands first album to feature two guitarists with Nick Poulos who joined the band in 2015. Foresta stated that having an additional guitarist help them achieve a more "metal punk sound."

The albums artwork was created by the bands friend, Andrei Bouzikov. This was the fourth album cover done for the band he had previously created the artwork for Massive Aggressive, The Art Of Partying, and their split Ep with Toxic Holocaust – Toxic Waste.

Slime And Punishment was engineered by the bands bassist Phil "Landphil" Hall at Blaze of Torment Studios in Richmond, Virginia. It was mixed and mastering by Bill Metoyer in Hollywood, California.

On April 28, 2017, Municipal Waste announced the album's release date and released the album's first single "Amateur Sketch." The albums title track was released as the second and final single on May 26. Municipal Waste took part in the 2017 Warped tour in support of the album.

== Critical reception ==
Professional ratings
Review scores
Source	Rating
Exclaim!	8/10
Kerrang!	4/5
Punknews.org	4/5 stars
Metal Injection	8/10
Metal Sucks	4.5/5 stars
Metal.de	9/10
The Music	3.5/5 stars
Ultimate Guitar	7.7

The album was met with positive reception Metal Injection wrote "Municipal Waste have mastered the formulas of traditional thrash metal and then inject it with a healthy dose of their own audacity. The big hardcore choruses, angular riffs and tight song lengths mean that Slime And Punishment remains vital for its refreshingly brief 28 minute run time." Metal Hammer wrote that it was "Waste’s strongest album since The Art Of Partying and it’s every bit as demented, uplifting and timeless as fans will be expecting." Loudwire stated "Municipal Waste have never released a studio album longer than 40 minutes long, with Slime and Punishment clocking in at a quick 29 minutes and the longest song (“Death Proof”) still under three minutes.. It flies by in a blur of shredding, shout-along choruses and memorable moments."

Maximus of Metal Sucks added "Slime and Punishment is a concept album about having fun in a society that only revels in branded, corporate-friendly frivolity. Municipal Waste are the ultimate expression of not giving a fuck about anything other than not giving a fuck. They're not the band we deserve; they're the band we need." German reviewer Metal.de also gave the album praise writing " it sounds fresh and pissed off—exactly what fans have come to expect from the band." Joe Smith of Exclaim! noted "Slime And Punishment isn't a groundbreaking record, but it's a welcome addition to an already impressive catalogue that demonstrates why the band are still leading their genre, despite a five-year album gap."

Loudwire listed the album at number 23 on their year end list of the 25 best metal albums of 2017.

== Track listing ==
No.	Title	Length
1.	"Breathe Grease"	1:49
2.	"Enjoy the Night"	0:49
3.	"Dingy Situations"	1:39
4.	"Shrednecks"	2:16
5.	"Poison the Preacher"	2:01
6.	"Bourbon Discipline"	2:31
7.	"Parole Violators"	2:30
8.	"Slime and Punishment"	2:22
9.	"Amateur Sketch"	1:45
10.	"Excessive Celebration"	1:29
11.	"Low Tolerance"	2:21
12.	"Under the Waste Command" (instrumental)	1:50
13.	"Death Proof"	2:52
14.	"Think Fast"	2:30

== Personnel ==
Municipal Waste

- Tony Foresta – lead vocals
- Nick Poulos – lead guitar
- Ryan Waste – rhythm guitar, backing vocals
- Phil Hall – bass, backing vocals
- Dave Witte – drums

Guest vocalists

- Vinnie Stigma (on "Parole Violators")

Production

- Produced by Municipal Waste
- Mixed and mastered by Bill Metoyer
- Artwork by Andrei Bouzikov

== Charts ==
Chart (2017)	Peak position
Belgian Albums (Ultratop Wallonia)	117
Canada Hard Music Albums (Billboard)	75
Canada Top Current Albums (Billboard)	180
UK Independent Albums (OCC)	29
UK Rock & Metal Albums (OCC)	17
UK Independent Album Breakers (OCC)	6
US Top Album Sales (Billboard)	52
US Top Hard Rock Albums (Billboard)	5
US Heatseekers Albums (Billboard)	3
US Independent Albums (Billboard)	9
US Indie Store Album Sales (Billboard)	8
US Vinyl Albums (Billboard)	12
