= Burnt by the Sun (disambiguation) =

Burnt by the Sun may refer to:

- Burnt by the Sun, a Russian film
  - To ostatnia niedziela, the Russian version of the Polish tango To ostatnia niedziela by Jerzy Petersburski
- Burnt by the Sun 2, a sequel to the above film
- Burnt by the Sun 2: The Citadel
- Burnt by the Sun, a play by Peter Flannery, based on the film
- Burnt by the Sun (band), an American metalcore band
  - Burnt by the Sun (EP)
