= Birds of Prey (band) =

American band

- Origin: Richmond, Virginia
- Genres: Death metal, sludge metal, death 'n' roll
- Years active: 2005–present
- Label: Relapse
- Members: Ben Hogg; Erik Larson; Bo Leslie; Summer Welch; Dave Witte

Birds of Prey is a Southern-influenced death metal supergroup hailing from Richmond, Virginia. They released their third full-length, The Hellpreacher, through Relapse Records.

== History ==
Birds of Prey was formed in 2005 as the side project to five busy musicians who were looking for additional creative outlets besides their own pre-existing projects. Composed of Ben Hogg from Beaten Back to Pure on vocals, Erik Larson from Alabama Thunderpussy and Bo Leslie from The Last Van Zant on guitars, Summer Welch from Baroness handling bass duties and Dave Witte, from numerous bands including Municipal Waste, Burnt by the Sun and Discordance Axis on drums.

Focusing on old-school death metal, the band has made a name for themselves in the metal community ever since forming in 2005. The band entered the studio in December of that year before even signing to a record label and started work on their debut album entitled Weight of the Wound with Cory Smoot at Karma Productions Studio in Richmond, Virginia. Shortly after the new year started Relapse Records, which is home to many of the band members other projects including Baroness, Alabama Thunderpussy and Burnt by the Sun signed Birds of Prey and set out to release their debut album internationally. Weight of the Wound was officially released on July 25, 2006, and it introduced the world to the newly formed super group, who before this point had never released a single song or ever played a live show. Reception for the album was positive with about.com, Allmusic and allthatisheavy.com giving the album excellent reviews. Despite the band member's other commitments, Birds of Prey soon returned to the studio to record their second full-length album entitled Sulfur and Semen. This time the album was recorded at Sniper Studio's in North Carolina with Vince Burke producing the project. After wrapping up recording in late 2007, the album was officially released on January 29, 2008, through Releapse Records. The band, now with a dedicated following, released the tracks, "Turning Big Rocks into Little Rocks" and "Lice Halo" onto their Myspace before the official release date as promotional teaser tracks to hype the upcoming release of Sulfur and Semen.

Still with all the continued success Sulfur and Semen brought the band, Birds of Prey were unable to play a live show because of each member's commitment to their other projects. Even with this impediment, Birds of Prey have never allowed that to stifle their artistic creativity and in 2009, the musicians returned to Sniper Studio's to record their third full-length album through Relapse Records entitled The Hellpreacher. The album was released on April 28 in the U.S. and May 4 internationally. The Hellpreacher expands on the band's creativity and continues to broaden Birds of Prey's musical showcase. The Hellpreacher is a concept album telling the story of a prison inmate turned priest. The album is the band's most successful release yet being carried in national stores including Wal-Mart, FYE and Virgin Records super stores. The band released "Momma" and "Juvie" to their Myspace before allowing the album to be streamed in its entirety the week of its release at www.thehellpreacher.info. With the release of their third album the band finally set their sights on playing live and scheduled their first live show to be at Maryland Deathfest VII, May 28–30 alongside renowned metal acts such as Eyehategod, Converge, Incantation and 16.

== Personnel ==
=== Current members ===
- Ben Hogg (vocals)
- Erik Larson (guitar)
- Bo Leslie (guitar)
- Summer Welch (bass)
- Dave Witte (drums)

== Discography ==
=== Albums ===
- Weight of the Wound (Relapse Records, 2006)
- Sulfur and Semen (Relapse Records, 2008)
- The Hellpreacher (Relapse Records, 2009)
