= Exit-13 =

American grindcore band

- Origin: Millersville, Pennsylvania
- Genres: Grindcore
- Years active: 1989–1997
- Labels: Econcentric; Thrash; Relapse
- Members: Bill Yurkiewicz (vocals); Bliss Blood (vocals); Steve O'Donnell (guitar); Dan Lilker (bass, piano, vocals); Richard Hoak (drums, piano, vocals)
- Past members: Dave Witte (drums); Pat McCahan (drums); Bill Schaeffer; Joel DiPietro (bass); Scott Lewis (drums)

Exit-13 was an American grindcore band from Millersville, Pennsylvania. The band were formed in 1989 by Relapse Records founder and co-owner Bill Yurkiewicz (vocals), guitarist Steve O'Donnell and bassist Joel DiPietro. Their early recordings, including the Disembowelling Party, The Unrequited Love of Chicken Soup and Eat More Crust demos (all 1989), their debut full-length Green Is Good (1990) and the EPs The Unrequited Love of Chicken Soup (1990) and Spare the Wrench, Surrender the Earth (1991) featured a line-up of Yurkiewicz, O'Donnell and DiPietro, with drum duties being shared between Bill Schaeffer and Pat McCahan.

Exit-13 underwent a line-up change prior to 1994's Ethos Musick, and recruited the rhythm section of Dan Lilker, famous for his work with Anthrax, Nuclear Assault and Brutal Truth on bass guitar, and his Brutal Truth bandmate Scott Lewis on drums. Brutal Truth's vocalist Kevin Sharp also provided backing vocals. Future line-ups were to include Bliss Blood (of Pain Teens), Richard Hoak (of Brutal Truth) and Dave Witte (of Burnt by the Sun, Discordance Axis and Municipal Waste), amongst others.

The band's lyrics mainly focused on environmental issues (with support for groups like Earth First!), but also concentrate on social issues. The band also supported the decriminalization of marijuana.

== Members ==
=== Last recording line-up ===
- Bill Yurkiewicz (vocals)
- Bliss Blood (vocals)
- Dan Lilker (bass, piano, vocals)
- Steve O'Donnell (guitars, vocals)
- Richard Hoak (drums, piano, vocals)

=== Other members ===
- Scott Lewis (drums)
- Joel DiPietro (bass)
- Pat McCahan (drums)
- Bill Shaeffer (drums)
- Dave Witte (drums)

== Discography ==
- 1989: Disembowelling Party (demo)
- 1989: The Unrequited Love of Chicken Soup (demo)
- 1989: Eat More Crust (demo)
- 1990: Green Is Good (Ecocentric Records)
- 1990: The Unrequited Love of Chicken Soup EP (Thrash Records)
- 1991: Spare the Wrench, Surrender the Earth EP (Relapse)
- 1993: Don't Spare The Green Love compilation (Relapse)
- 1994: Ethos Musick (Relapse)
- 1995: Split 7-inch EP with Multiplex (HG Fact)
- 1995: ...Just A Few More Hits (Relapse)
- 1996: Split CD with Hemdale (Visceral Productions)
- 1996: Gout d'Belgium/Black Weakeners (Relapse)
- 1996: Smoking Songs (Relapse)
- 2004: Relapse Singles Series Vol. 4, split with Phobia, Goreaphobia and Amorphis (Relapse)
- 2007: High Life! compilation (Relapse)
