= Municipal waste (disambiguation) =

Municipal solid waste is a waste type that includes predominantly household waste.

Municipal waste may also refer to:

- Municipal Waste (band), an American crossover thrash band
  - Municipal Waste (EP), their 2001 album
