= Heart of Darkness (Burnt by the Sun album) =

Studio album by Burnt by the Sun
- Released: August 25, 2009
- Genre: Metalcore, deathcore, grindcore
- Length: 34:12
- Label: Relapse Records
- Producer: Eric Rachel, Burnt by the Sun

Burnt by the Sun chronology
The Perfect Is the Enemy of the Good (2003)	Heart of Darkness (2009)

Professional ratings
Review scores
Source	Rating
About.com	4/5 stars
Allmusic	3/5 stars

Heart of Darkness is the third and final full-length album from the band Burnt by the Sun, released on Relapse Records.

== Track-listing ==
All lyrics are written by Michael Olender; all music is composed by Michael Olender.

No.	Title	Length
1.	"Inner Station"	2:44
2.	"Cardiff Giant"	2:28
3.	"F-Unit"	3:32
4.	"A Party to the Unsound Method"	4:01
5.	"There Will Be Blood"	3:27
6.	"Goliath"	3:30
7.	"Rust / Future Primitive"	5:32
8.	"Beacon"	2:04
9.	"The Great American Dream Machine"	2:23
10.	"The Wolves Are Running"	4:31
Total length:		34:12

== Personnel ==
- Michael Olender - vocals
- John Adubato - guitars
- Chris Rascio - guitars
- Ted Patterson - bass
- Dave Witte - drums

== Production ==
- Produced by Eric Rachel & Burnt by the Sun
- Engineered By Eric Rachel
- Mastered By Eric Rachel
- Artwork design by Orion Landau
