= Human Remains (band) =

American grindcore band

- Origin: New Jersey, U.S.
- Genres: Grindcore; death metal
- Years active: 1989–1995
- Label: Relapse
- Past members: Paul Miller; Steve Procopio; Jim Baglino; Teddy Patterson III; William Carl Black; Dave Witte

Human Remains was an American grindcore band formed in 1989 in New Jersey. The band featured vocalist Paul Miller, guitarists Steve Procopio and James Baglino, and drummer Dave Witte, known for his work for Discordance Axis, Burnt by the Sun, and Atomsmasher. The band's Using Sickness as a Hero EP was released by Relapse Records in 1996. A compilation album featuring the band's discography, Where Were You When: 1989-1995, was released in 2002.

The band was known for its "unusual and cliché-free" songwriting and grindcore, hardcore, and death metal blend, which was influential in the development of experimental edges of the grindcore, death metal and noisecore scenes.

== Band members ==
- Paul Miller – vocals
- Steve Procopio – guitar
- Jim Baglino – guitar
- Teddy Patterson III – bass (1989–94)
- William Carl Black – bass (1994–95)
- Dave Witte – drums

== Discography ==
Extended plays

- Admirations Most Deep and Foul (1992)
- When Forever Becomes Until... (1995)
- Using Sickness as a Hero (1996)

Compilation albums

- Where Were You When (2002)

Demos

- 1990 Demo (1990)
- 1992 Demo (1992)
