= Where Were You When =

When Where You When

Compilation album by Human Remains
- Released: March 19, 2002
- Genre: Grindcore; death metal
- Length: 89:34
- Label: Relapse

Human Remains chronology
Using Sickness as a Hero (1996)	When Where You When (2002)

Where Were You When: 1989–1995 is a compilation album by American grindcore band Human Remains. It was released on March 19, 2002 through Relapse Records. The first disc of the album contains all the officially released material, including two 7"s, the Using Sickness as a Hero EP, and a compilation-only track, while the second disc features 18 demo tracks, including previous versions of most tracks on the first disc as well as seven previously unreleased songs.

== Critical reception ==
Professional ratings
Review scores
Source	Rating
AllMusic	4.5/5 stars

AllMusic critic William York praised the album, stating: "This is still obviously the CD to buy for anyone interested in Human Remains, and it's also recommended for anyone interested in grindcore or more experimental death metal."

== Track listing ==
Disc one

1. "Patterns in the Grass" – 1:44
2. "Forked Tongue" – 1:02
3. "When Forever Becomes Until" – 2:18
4. "Weeding Out the Thorns" – 2:36
5. "Waste of Time" – 1:44
6. "Rote" – 3:30
7. "Chewed Up and Spit Out" – 2:34
8. "Swollen" – 3:32
9. "Human" – 2:30
10. "Beyond Human Perception" – 0:15
11. "Spoiling of Beauty" – 3:08
12. "Intro/Mechanical" – 4:20
13. "Fragrance of Souls" – 3:28
14. "Symptoms of the New Society" – 2:38
15. "Pretty Build-Up" – 0:37

Disc two

1. "Symptoms of the New Society" – 2:17
2. "Blessed Paradise" – 2:59
3. "The Malignance" – 3:06
4. "Human" – 2:56
5. "Imagine" – 3:17
6. "Chemical Life" – 2:02
7. "Fictitiously Vivid" – 2:43
8. "Of the Same Flesh" – 3:33
9. "Sight Beyond Sickness" – 2:24
10. "Human" – 2:37
11. "Rote" – 3:36
12. "Swollen" – 3:38
13. "Mechanical" – 3:19
14. "Chewed Up and Spit Out" – 2:47
15. "Rote" – 3:31
16. "Weeding Out the Thorns" – 2:44
17. "Swollen" – 3:34
18. "Human" – 2:35

== Personnel ==
- Paul Miller – vocals
- Steve Procopio – guitar
- Jim Baglino – guitar
- Teddy Patterson III – bass
- William Carl Black – bass
- Dave Witte – drums
