= Flow My Tears, the Policeman Said =

1974 novel by Philip K. Dick

- Cover of first edition (hardcover)
- Author: Philip K. Dick
- Language: English
- Genre: Science fiction, paranoid fiction
- Publisher: Doubleday
- Publication date: 1974
- Publication place: United States
- Media type: Print (Hardcover & Paperback)
- Pages: 231
- ISBN: 0-7838-9583-6
- OCLC: 47650715

Flow My Tears, the Policeman Said is a 1974 science fiction novel by American writer Philip K. Dick. The novel is set in a futuristic dystopia where the United States has become a police state in the aftermath of a Second American Civil War. The story follows genetically enhanced pop singer and television star Jason Taverner, who wakes up in a world where he has never existed.

The book was nominated for a Nebula Award in 1974 and a Hugo Award in 1975, and was awarded the John W. Campbell Memorial Award for Best Science Fiction Novel in 1975.

== Plot ==
The novel is set in a dystopian version of 1988, following a Second Civil War which led to the collapse of the United States' democratic institutions. The National Guard ("nats") and US police force ("pols") reestablished social order through instituting a dictatorship, with a "Director" at the apex, and police marshals and generals as operational commanders in the field. Resistance to the regime is largely confined to university campuses, where radicalized former university students eke out a desperate existence in subterranean kibbutzim. Recreational drug use is widespread, and the age of consent has been lowered to 12. The black population has almost been rendered extinct. Most commuting is undertaken by personal aircraft, allowing great distances to be covered in little time.

The novel begins with the protagonist, Jason Taverner, a singer, hosting his weekly TV show which has an audience of 30 million viewers. His special guest is his girlfriend Heather Hart, also a singer. Both Hart and Taverner are "Sixes", members of an elite class of genetically engineered humans. While leaving the studio, Taverner is telephoned by a former lover, who asks him to pay her a visit. When Taverner arrives at her apartment, the former lover attacks him by throwing a parasitic life-form at him. Although he manages to remove most of the life-form, parts of it are left inside him. After being rescued by Hart, he is taken to a medical facility.

Waking up the following day in a seedy hotel with no identification, Taverner becomes worried, as failure to produce identification at one of the numerous police checkpoints would lead to imprisonment in a forced labor camp. Through a succession of phone calls made from the hotel to colleagues and friends who now claim not to know him, Taverner establishes that he is no longer recognized by the outside world. He soon manages to bribe the hotel's clerk into taking him to Kathy Nelson, a forger of government documents. However, Kathy reveals that both she and the clerk are police informants, and that the lobby clerk has placed a microscopic tracking device on him. She promises not to turn Taverner over to the police on the condition that he spend the night with her. Although he attempts to escape, Kathy confronts him again after he successfully passes a police checkpoint using the forged identity cards. Feeling in her debt, he accompanies Kathy to her apartment block, where Inspector McNulty, Kathy's police handler, is waiting. McNulty has located Taverner via the tracking device the hotel lobby clerk placed on him, and instructs Taverner to come with him to the 469th Precinct police station so that further biometric identity checks can be performed.

At the station, McNulty erroneously reports the man's name as Jason Tavern, revealing the identity of a Wyoming diesel engine mechanic. During questioning, Taverner goes along with McNulty's mistake, explaining that he no longer resembles Tavern due to extensive plastic surgery. McNulty accepts this explanation and decides to release Taverner while lab checks are run on the rest of the documents. He issues Taverner a seven-day police pass to ensure he can pass police checkpoints in the interim period. Deciding to lie low, Taverner heads to a Las Vegas bar in the hopes of meeting a woman with whom he can stay. Instead, he encounters a former lover, Ruth Gomen; although she no longer recognizes him, he succeeds in his bid to seduce her and is taken back to her apartment. On the orders of Police General Felix Buckman, Gomen's apartment is raided and Taverner is taken into custody, being transported immediately to the Police Academy in Los Angeles.

Buckman personally interrogates Taverner, soon reaching the conclusion that Taverner genuinely does not know why he no longer appears to exist. However, he suspects that Taverner may be part of a larger plot involving the Sixes. He orders Taverner released, although ensuring that tracking devices are again placed on him. Outside the police academy, Taverner is approached by Alys Buckman, Felix's hypersexual sister and lover. Alys removes the tracking devices from Taverner and invites him to the home she shares with her brother. On the way there, she tells Taverner that she knows he is a TV star and reveals copies of his records.

At the Buckmans' home, Taverner takes Alys up on an offer of mescaline. When he has a bad reaction to the drug, Alys goes to find him a medicine to counteract it. When she does not return, Taverner goes to search for her, only to find her skeletal remains on the bathroom floor. Frightened and confused, he flees, unsuccessfully pursued by a private security guard. To aid in his escape, he asks for the help of Mary Anne Dominic, a potter. Heading to a cafe with her, they find that one of his records is on the jukebox. When his song plays, people begin to recognize him as a celebrity. After parting with Dominic, Taverner goes to the apartment of his celebrity girlfriend Heather Hart. She returns home, horrified, and shows Taverner a newspaper mentioning that he is wanted in connection with Alys Buckman's death, the motive believed to have been his jealousy over Alys' purported relationship with Hart.

An autopsy reveals that Alys' death was caused by an experimental reality-warping drug called KR-3. The coroner explains to Felix that, as Alys was a fan of Taverner, her use of the drug caused Taverner to be transported to a parallel universe where he no longer existed. Her death then caused his return to his own universe. The Police General decides to implicate Taverner in Alys' death to distract attention from his incest. The press are informed that Taverner is a suspect in the case and, wishing to clear his name, Taverner surrenders himself to the police. Heartbroken over the death of his sister, Felix returns home, suffering a nervous breakdown on the way.

In an epilogue, the final fates of the main characters are disclosed. Buckman retires to Borneo where he is assassinated soon after writing an exposé of the global police apparatus. Taverner is cleared of all charges and dies of old age, while Heather Hart abandons her celebrity career and becomes a recluse. Dominic's pottery wins an international award and her works become of great value while she lives into her eighties. KR-3 test trials are deemed too destructive and the project is abandoned. Ultimately, the revolutionary students give up and voluntarily enter forced-labor camps. The detention camps later dwindle away and close down, the government no longer posing a threat.

== Reception ==
New York Times reviewer Gerald Jonas praised the novel, saying that "Dick skillfully explores the psychological ramifications of this nightmare," but concludes that the story's concluding rationalization of its events is an artistic "miscalculation [and] a major flaw in an otherwise superb novel."

== Title ==
The title is a reference to "Flow, my tears", an ayre by the 16th-century composer John Dowland, setting to music a poem by an anonymous author (possibly Dowland himself). Quotations from the piece begin every major section of the novel, and Dowland's work is referenced in several of Dick's works. The poem begins:

Flow, my tears, fall from your springs,
Exiled for ever, let me mourn
Where night's black bird her sad infamy sings,
There let me live forlorn.

The novel is parodied as The Android Cried Me a River in Dick's later novel VALIS.

== Author's interpretation ==
In his undelivered speech "How to Build a Universe That Doesn't Fall Apart Two Days Later," Dick recounts how in describing an incident at the end of the book (end of chapter 27) to an Episcopalian priest, the priest noted its striking similarity to a scene in the Acts of the Apostles in the Bible. In Dick's book, the police chief, Felix Buckman, meets a black stranger at an all-night gas station, and uncharacteristically makes an emotional connection with him. After handing the stranger a drawing of a heart pierced by an arrow, Buckman flies away, but he quickly returns and hugs the stranger, and they strike up a friendly conversation. In Acts Chapter 8, the disciple Philip meets an Ethiopian eunuch (a black man) sitting in a chariot, to whom he explains a passage from the Book of Isaiah, and then converts him to Christianity.

Dick further notes that eight years after writing the book, he himself uncharacteristically came to the aid of a black stranger who had run out of gas. After giving the man some money and then driving away, he returned to help the man reach a gas station. Dick was then struck by the similarity between this incident and that described in his book.

Dick also recounts an unusual dream he had when writing the book, and how he felt compelled to get it into the text of the novel. Years later, he came to interpret this dream as the key to understanding the real meaning of the story, stating:

Deciphered, my novel tells a quite different story from the surface story (…). The real story is simply this: the return of Christ, now king rather than suffering servant. Judge rather than victim of unfair judgment. Everything is reversed. The core message of my novel, without my knowing it, was a warning to the powerful: You will shortly be judged and condemned.

== Adaptations ==
=== Stage ===
Mabou Mines presented the world premiere of a theatrical adaptation of Flow My Tears, the Policeman Said at the Boston Shakespeare Theatre from June 18–30, 1985. The play received mixed reviews but was widely covered by the Boston media. Linda Hartinian, a personal friend of Dick, adapted the novel to the stage and designed the set, in addition to portraying Mary Ann Dominic and reading Dick's 1981 "Tagore Letter" at the end of the play.

The Boston Phoenix quotes Hartinian on the subject in an interview before the play opened: "[Dick] was someone I admired and looked up to, and I knew he had always wanted one of his works to be adapted. One day when I came to visit him he jumped up and grabbed this manuscript and said 'I want to give you something, but I don't have anything, so I'm going to give you this manuscript, and someday its gonna be worth a lot of money.'" The Phoenix continues, "It was a draft of Flow My Tears, and as Hartinian discovered when she sat down to adapt the book, it contained many passages that had been cut from the published text, including a discussion of ways to remember deceased writers that was to prove prescient. Naturally Hartinian based her script on her private edition."

The play was directed by Bill Raymond, Hartinian's husband. "It was in response to Linda's loss that we chose Tears," he told the Phoenix, "because Flow My Tears is in fact a novel about grief, and not necessarily just about loss of identity."

The play has been performed by Mabou Mines in Boston and New York City, and by the Prop Theatre in Chicago, and the Evidence Room in Los Angeles. The Evidence Room production received positive reviews including one from the Los Angeles Times which stated that "the piece is vintage Dick, fluctuating between the inventive and the paranoiac."

=== Film ===
On February 1, 2004, Variety announced that Utopia Pictures & Television had acquired the rights to produce adaptations of three of Dick's novels: Flow My Tears, the Policeman Said, VALIS and Radio Free Albemuth. In 2007, The Halcyon Company acquired the first-look rights to Dick's works, and in May 2009 they announced that after Terminator Salvation (2009), they would next adapt Flow My Tears, the Policeman Said.

The book is referenced in the 2001 film Waking Life and in Richard Kelly's 2006 film Southland Tales, in which an underground revolutionary dressed as a police officer (played by Jon Lovitz) says, "Flow my tears" as he shoots two rivals. Also, two of the main characters are Roland and Ronald Taverner.

=== Music ===
Gary Numan referenced the novel in the 1978 song "Listen to the Sirens" from the debut Tubeway Army album. The song opens with the lyric, "'Flow my tears', the new police song."

The Human League used a character named Jason Taverner as the host of their elusive 1979 demo tape, which has since become known by fans as the Taverner Tape. Taverner introduces each of the songs and mentions that he hosts his own network TV show.

American grindcore band Discordance Axis, released a song by the same name on their 1997 album Jouhou. Discordance Axis were influenced by cyberpunk and science fiction.

Avant-Pop collective MMC Ensemble, references the novel on their first release, Twin Lovers within the songs "Montgomery L. Hopkins", "Jason Taverner Does Not Exist", "Sixes", "Watts Proper", and "Twin Lovers".

The American indie rock band Built to Spill released a song, "Nowhere Nothin' Fuckup" on their 1993 album Ultimate Alternative Wavers. The song on the album has the same name as protagonist Jason Taverner's hit played repeatedly on the jukebox by character Anne Dominic in the coffee shop in the novel.

American bass guitar player Stu Hamm released a Philip K. Dick themed solo album in 1998 titled Radio Free Albemuth featuring the song "Flow My Tears".

In 2019, American electronic musician Adderall Canyonly released a concept album based off the novel, intended as a literary soundtrack.
