= You Suck =

You Suck may refer to:

== Music ==
- You Suck (band), a band formed by John S. Hall

=== Songs ===
- "You Suck" (song), 1994 song and single by The Murmurs off their eponymous album Murmurs
- "You Suck" (song), 1992 song by Consolidated off the album Play More Music
- "You Suck" (song), 2002 song by Edan off the album Primitive Plus
- "You Suck" (song), 2006 song by Strapping Young Lad off the album The New Black
- "You Suck" (song), 2007 song by Pour Habit off the album Suiticide
- "You Suck" (song), 2008 song by Vitamin X off the album Full Scale Assault
- "I Love/You Suck" (song), 2012 song by Reel Big Fish off the album Candy Coated Fury
- "You Suck" (song), 2014 tune by Tim Herlihy from the soundtrack for the film Blended
- "You Suck" (song), 2019 song and single by Volumes (band)
- "You Suck <3" (song), 2021 song and single by Akintoye (rapper)
- "You Suck" (song), 2023 song and single by Rachel Grae
- "You Suck" (song), a song by the fictional TV character 'Phoebe Buffay' from the 1990s U.S. TV sitcom Friends
- "You Suck" (song), a song by the fictional TV band 'Armada' from the 1990s Canadian TV sketch comedy show The Kids in the Hall (TV series)
- "The You Suck Chant" (song), a song by the eponymous band You Suck founded by John S. Hall

== Insults ==
- "you suck", an insult; see suck
- "You suck!", the first instance of this insult on U.S. network TV, shown in Uncle Buck (1990 TV series)
- "YOU SUCK!", a joke about Wikipedia vandalism in the video for "Weird Al" Yankovic's 2006 song White & Nerdy

== Other uses ==
- You Suck: A Love Story (book), 2007 novel by Christopher Moore
- "You Suck!" (episode), 2005 season 2 TV episode of Odd Job Jack; see List of Odd Job Jack episodes
- You Suck (game), 2013 tabletop game from Bézier Games

== See also ==
- The dictionary definition of suck at Wiktionary
- Showyousuck (born 1985), U.S. rapper
- Yoo-suk, a Korean given name
- Suck (disambiguation)
- You (disambiguation)
