= About to Crack =

About To Crack

Studio album by Vitamin X
- Released: 11 September 2012
- Studio: Electrical Audio
- Genres: Hardcore punk, crossover thrash
- Length: 18:25
- Labels: Tankcrimes, Agipunk
- Producer: Steve Albini

Vitamin X chronology
Full Scale Assault (2008)	About To Crack (2012)	Age Of Paranoia (2018)

Professional ratings
Review scores
Source	Rating
Ox-Fanzine	8/10

About To Crack is the fifth studio album by Dutch punk hardcore band Vitamin X. Released through Tankcrimes on 11 September 2012 in the US, Agipunk in Europe and Peculio Discos in Brazil. The album was recorded at Electrical Audio in Chicago by Steve Albini.

An animation video of the song 'About To Crack' was released in 2016 based on John Baizleys artwork and created by Marco IMOV from IMOV Studios. The video features (animated) cameos from people across the punk and metal scenes (Lemmy, Danzig, Municipal Waste, Ozzy, etc.). The cartoon style owes a debt to Beavis & Butthead while paying homage to The Simpsons. The video went viral, reached millions of views on YouTube and was selected for the 2016 Annecy International Animation Festival

== Track listing ==
All tracks are written by Marc Emmerik, except where noted.

No.	Title	Length
1.	"About To Crack"	1:14
2.	"Ready To Burn"	1:40
3.	"Carnival Of Fools"	1:03
4.	"Crank It Up"	1:02
5.	"Straight Back"	1:20
6.	"Maelstrom"	1:28
7.	"I Don't Know What To Say"	1:28
8.	"Shatter The Beast" (Lyrics: Emmerik/Koutsman)	1:21
9.	"Outta Here"	1:09
10.	"No Return"	1:12
11.	"Raise The Flag"	0:51
12.	"Sick And Tired" (Koutsman)	1:23
13.	"Mind Control/Crowd Control"	1:24
14.	"Last Laugh"	1:50

== Personnel ==
- Marko Korac - vocals
- Marc Emmerik - guitars, backing vocals
- Alex Koutsman - bass, backing vocals
- Wolfram "Wolfi" Eggebrecht - drums
- Steve Albini - recording, engineering, mixing
- Dan Randall - mastering
- Benjamin Flint - assistant engineer
- Patrick Delabie - additional dubs
- John Dyer Baizley - art
- Gijs Edge, Marc, Marko - layout
