= Full Scale Assault =

Studio album by Vitamin X
- Released: 10 October 2008
- Recorded: 31 January – 8 February 2008
- Genres: Hardcore punk; thrashcore
- Length: 27:03
- Labels: Tankcrimes, Agipunk
- Producer: Steve Albini

Vitamin X chronology
Bad Trip (2004)	Full Scale Assault (2008)	About to Crack (2012)

Full Scale Assault is the fourth studio album by Dutch punk hardcore band Vitamin X. Released through Tankcrimes on 10 October 2008 in the US, and Agipunk in Europe. The album was recorded at Electrical Audio in Chicago by Steve Albini who previously recorded Nirvana, Neurosis, PJ Harvey, High on Fire, Iggy Pop & The Stooges. It features guest vocals from Negative Approach's singer John Brannon. Art is by John Dyer Baizley.

An official video of the song 'Deal With It' was released featuring guest vocalist John Brannon. Thrasher (magazine) released a skate video 'Hot Feet In the Heat' featuring skater of the year Tony Trujillo using the song 'Time Has Come'

== Track listing ==
All songs written and composed by Marc Emmerik, except where noted.

No.	Title	Length
1.	"Full Scale Assault"	1.42
2.	"Deal With It"	1:21
3.	"Get In The Pit"	1:09
4.	"Pull No Punches"	1:15
5.	"Better Get Away" (Lyrics: Emmerik/Koutsman)	1:06
6.	"Time Has Come"	1:32
7.	"You Suck"	1:20
8.	"Grim Reaper" (Lyrics: Emmerik/Koutsman)	1:01
9.	"Take It Or Leave It"	1:18
10.	"Head Full Of Demons"	1:03
11.	"Pressure Release"	1.15
12.	"Big Black Hole" (Koutsman)	1:15
13.	"Slam Dunk"	1:11
14.	"Disintegration / Civilisation" (Lyrics: Emmerik/Koutsman)	1:56
15.	"Blown Away"	1:10
16.	"Watcha Gonna Do?"	1:21
17.	"Wake Up"	1:02
18.	"Block Bust"	1:20
19.	"Suburban Nightmare"	1:34
20.	"Yes Sir, No Sir"	1:01

== Personnel ==
The following people contributed to 'Full Scale Assault':

Vitamin X

- Marko Korac – vocals
- Marc Emmerik – guitars, backing vocals
- Alex Koutsman – bass, backing vocals
- Wolfi – drums

Guest musicians

- John Brannon – vocals on 'Deal With It', 'Pressure Release' & backing vocals on 'Watcha Gonna Do'
- Nick Baran, Joe ANS - backing vocals

Other credits

- Steve Albini – recording, engineering, mixing
- Alan Douches – mastering
- Benjamin Flint – assistant engineer
- Chris Koltay – recording John Brannon vocals at High Bias, Detroit
- Patrick Delabie – additional dubs
- John Dyer Baizley – art
