= Jouhou =

1997 grindcore album by Discordance Axis

Studio album by Discordance Axis
- Released: February 1997
- Recorded: July–September 1996
- Studios: Straight Jacket Studios (Allston, Massachusetts); Trax East (South River, New Jersey)
- Genre: Grindcore
- Length: 17:38
- Labels: Devour (#8); Hydra Head (HH666-72)
- Producers: Bill T. Miller, Steve Evetts

Discordance Axis chronology
| Ulterior (1995) | Jouhou (1997) | Necropolitan (1997) |

Jouhou is the second studio album by grindcore band Discordance Axis, originally released on vinyl format in February 1997 through Devour Records in a limited edition of 4000. The 1998 compact disc edition of the album included tracks taken from splits. The album was re-released on CD by Hydra Head Records on January 27, 2004. The song "Flow My Tears, the Policeman Said" is named after the novel of the same name by Philip K. Dick.

== Background and recording ==
Recording sessions for the album were very stressful for the band, as members would frequently fight and argue. Tracks recorded for the album were either written before the sessions took place or were made up on the spot during studio time. Drums and guitars were recorded at Straight Jacket Studios, Allston, Massachusetts from July to August 1996. Vocals were recorded at Trax East, South River, New Jersey in September 1996, where the album was also mixed. Split material that's featured on the CD editions of the album were all recorded and mixed at Trax East in April 1995.

When the album was released in February 1997, the trio scheduled a tour in Japan to support the record. However, due to rising band tensions of scheduling conflicts, guitarist Rob Marton left the band, with Steve Procopio hired to fill in for his place. By the time the tour was completed in 1998, the group went on hiatus. In 1999, the band, including Marton, reunited and began to work on material that would eventually become their acclaimed third album The Inalienable Dreamless.

== Reception ==
Professional ratings
Review scores
| Source | Rating |
|---|---|
| Allmusic | 4/5 stars |
| Pitchfork | 9.3/10 |

Jouhou received positive reviews from critics. Fred Thomas of AllMusic gave the CD reissue four stars out of five, citing that despite the brevity of the tracks that tracks like "Flow My Tears, the Policeman Said" were "powerful examples of grindcore grandeur". Chris Ott of Pitchfork praised the CD reissue, claiming it as Discordance Axis' definitive release for its replay value and "melodic distortion and blast-beats".

== Track listing ==
| No. | Title | Length |
|---|---|---|
| 1. | "Vertigo Index" | 0:53 |
| 2. | "Panoptic" | 0:58 |
| 3. | "Aperture of Pinholes" | 1:01 |
| 4. | "Information Sniper" | 0:41 |
| 5. | "Carcass Lottery" | 1:15 |
| 6. | "Come Apart Together, Come Apart Alone" | 0:45 |
| 7. | "Rain Perimeter" | 0:53 |
| 8. | "A Broken Tomorrow" | 0:46 |
| 9. | "Attrition" | 0:26 |
| 10. | "Nikola Tesla" | 1:02 |
| 11. | "Flow My Tears the Policeman Said" | 0:52 |
| 12. | "Jouhou" | 0:48 |
| 13. | "Damage Style" | 0:51 |
| 14. | "Aether Scalpul" | 0:36 |
| 15. | "A Crack in the Cataracts" | 0:28 |
| 16. | "Numb(ers)" | 0:46 |
| 17. | "Ashtray Ballpoint" | 0:58 |
| 18. | "Typeface" | 1:10 |
| 19. | "Reciprocity" | 1:12 |
| 20. | "Reincarnation" | 1:17 |
| Total length: | | 17:38 |

CD bonus tracks
| No. | Title | Taken from | Length |
|---|---|---|---|
| 21. | "Alzheimer" | split 7-inch with Plutocracy | 0:35 |
| 22. | "Flow My Tears the Policeman Said" | split 7-inch with Plutocracy | 0:51 |
| 23. | "Eye Gag" | split 7-inch with Plutocracy | 0:24 |
| 24. | "Area Trinity" | split 7-inch with Plutocracy | 1:11 |
| 25. | "Integer" | split 7-inch with Plutocracy | 1:03 |
| 26. | "Information Sniper" | split 7-inch with Melt-Banana | 0:39 |
| 27. | "Amphetamine Hollow Tip" | split 7-inch with Melt-Banana | 0:59 |
| 28. | "Tokyo" | split 7-inch with Melt-Banana | 0:37 |
| 29. | "So Unfilial Rule" | split 7-inch with Melt-Banana | 0:09 |
| 30. | "Junk Utopia" | split 7-inch with Melt-Banana | 1:15 |
| 31. | "Continuity" | split 7-inch with Melt-Banana | 1:26 |
| 32. | Untitled (Live In Tokyo, 1998) | Previously Unreleased | 2:23 |
| Total length: | | | 29:10 |

== Personnel ==
Discordance Axis

- Jon Chang - vocals, artwork
- Rob Marton - guitars
- Dave Witte - drums

Production

- Steve Evetts - engineering
- Bill T. Miller - producing, recording
- Yas Koketsu - photography
- Bill Cathart - logo design
