= Destroy! =

Crust punk band from Minneapolis, active 1988–1994

- Origin: Minneapolis, Minnesota
- Genres: Crust punk, grindcore
- Years active: 1988–1994
- Label: Havoc Records
- Members: Felix Havoc; Mark Snorkelman; Dallas; Kirby Pringle; Yngwie Markstein; Chris; Mitch Useless; CyberNate Scabies; Jake Scabies; Mandy Manduke; Troll
- Website: http://destroy.net/bands/destroy

Destroy! was an American crust punk band from Minneapolis between 1988 and 1994. Vocalist Felix Havoc founded Havoc Records in 1992 as a vehicle for Destroy!'s Burn this Racist System Down 7-inch EP, and later used it to release music from other bands from 1993 onwards.

== Members ==
- Felix Havoc (Code 13, Damage Deposit)
- Yngwie Markstein (Disembodied, Look Back and Laugh, No Statik)
- Troll (Disrespect)
- CyberNate Scabies (Brainoil, Stormcrow)
- Mitch Useless (PersonHurter, Code 13, Servitude, Segue, Despise, Mördrot

== Discography ==
=== Demos ===
- Create Chaos demo, AYF, (1989)

=== EPs ===
- Total Fucking Chaos 7-inch EP, Relapse (GTGP) Records, (1991)
- Burn this Racist System Down 7-inch EP (1992)

=== LPs ===
- The Basement Years cassette, AYF, (1990)
- Necropolis LP/CD, Sound Pollution, (1994)

=== Live albums ===
- Live @ CBGBs cassette, AYF, (1990)

=== Split albums ===
- Destroy!/Disrupt split 7-inch EP, Adversity Records, (1991)
- Destroy!/Disturb split 7-inch EP, (1995)

== Compilations ==
- Son of Bllleeeeaaauuurrrrgghhh! 7-inch compilation, Slap A Ham
- Bloodless Unreality 7-inch comp.
- Crust & Anguished Life CD, MCR Recs., Japan. (1992)
- Songs For The Socially Retarded Cassette Compilation (Various Artists), Thrashing Mad
