= Waste 'Em All =

Studio album by Municipal Waste
- Released: January 27, 2003
- Recorded: October 2002
- Genre: Crossover thrash
- Length: 17:29
- Label: Six Weeks
- Producer: Mark Miley

Municipal Waste chronology
Waste 'Em All (2003)	Hazardous Mutation (2005)

Waste 'Em All is the debut studio album by crossover thrash metal band Municipal Waste. Released on January 27, 2003 on the record label "Six Weeks". This album caused the band to receive the attention of Earache Records, which the band signed to in May 2004. The album's name pays homage to Metallica's debut album, Kill 'Em All. Members on this album are Tony Foresta, Ryan Joy, Andy Harris, and Brandon Ferrell.

== Track listing ==
No.	Title	Length
1.	"The Executioner (Intro)"	1:12
2.	"Sweet Attack"	0:58
3.	"Mutants of War"	1:00
4.	"Knife Fight"	0:50
5.	"Drunk as Shit"	0:58
6.	"Death Prank"	0:11
7.	"Substitute Creature"	1:01
8.	"Waste 'Em All"	1:30
9.	"Toxic Revolution"	1:51
10.	"I Want to Kill the President"	0:17
11.	"Thrash?! Don't Mind If I Do"	0:56
12.	"Dropped Out"	0:46
13.	"Blood Hunger"	1:10
14.	"Jock Pit"	1:15
15.	"The Mountain Wizard"	1:25
16.	Untitled (hidden track)	2:09
Total length:		17:29
