= Black Army Jacket =

- Origin: United States
- Genres: Powerviolence; grindcore
- Years active: 1996-1999
- Website: Official Facebook Page

Black Army Jacket was an American powerviolence band. They released one album and many 7-inch EPs, splits and compilation appearances. Their members have gone on to play in such bands as Municipal Waste, Deny the Cross, Matt Pond PA, Burnt by the Sun and Hope Collapse.

== Biography ==
The band was started by Andrew Orlando (ex-guitarist of Milhouse and owner of Reservoir Records) and Carlos Ramirez after they met at a Fugazi show on Long Island, NY. They were both fans of bands like Terrorizer, Assück and Napalm Death and wanted to create a band in those styles. Halfman drummer Dan Crowell and Adverse Possession, Those of Us bassist Chris Russo were quickly recruited. They were both in high school at the time. The band rehearsed original material for a few weeks until scene veteran Rob Lawi joined in on lead vocals. BAJ entered NYC's LoHo Studios a few months later and recorded what would become their 1996 demo. The tape caused a small buzz in the hardcore and metal zine world and made many tape trader lists.

Queens, NY-based Chainsaw Safety Records would go on to release the band's The Path of Two Swords As One 7-inch and the band started to tour regionally shortly after. During the sessions for the aforementioned release, they recorded several more songs for future releases at NJ's Sweetwood Sound with current Dalek member Alap Momin behind the boards. Around this time both Crowell and Russo left the band and continued to play in Prom King with Mike Delorenzo of C.R. and Serpico, Brian Meehan of Milhouse and Loyal to None, and Ben Knight. Not long after they quit, Dave Witte joined the band on drums. Now a four-piece, they toured with California's Benumb and Noothgrush. This period proved to be fruitful for the group with many releases hitting stores and awareness growing.

In 1998, BAJ was invited to play the annual Milwaukee Metalfest along with bands including Destruction, Mercyful Fate, Death and Brutal Truth. They also went on to perform at that year's Fiesta Grande festival at Berkley, CA's Gilman St. club, organized by Spazz bassist/vocalist and Slap-A-Ham Records founder, Chris Dodge. The band wrote throughout the year and entered the studio with Dean Rispler (Killing Time, 25 ta Life) in the producer chair. The resulting album, 222, saw the musicians incorporating hints of death and black metal along with some more traditional elements of hardcore to their sound. They toured extensively to support their debut.

Relapse Records approached the band with an offer to release an EP of new material. They recorded a batch of new songs but Rob Lawi and the band parted ways shortly afterwards. Bassist Carlos Ramirez then became their vocalist and New Jersey native Tom Hayden joined in to fill the bass slot. Another native Jersey musician, John Adubato, was also asked to join to make Black Army Jacket a two guitar unit. Orlando and Ramirez were both huge fans of John's previous band, Times Up. Witte happened to be friends with the guitarist and he quickly jumped in just in time for some touring with the new lineup.

They came home from tour in mid-1999 and began to write newer, more technical material. They even talked about changing their name to get a fresh start. However, after a tough show in Worcester, MA the band decided to break up. Adubato and Witte then formed Burnt by the Sun, whilst Ramirez started melodic rockers Lakota a few years later. Andrew Orlando went on to join Anodyne and then Disnihil in the early 2000s (decade). Witte, Orlando and Ramirez recorded an EP under the name Hope Collapse in the mid-'00s, and are currently both in Deny the Cross, a powerviolence band that also features Dan Lactose (Spazz) and Ramon Salcido (Agents of Satan).

In 2006, Black Box Recordings released a Black Army Jacket semi-discography entitled Closed Casket. It featured their 1996 demo, assorted splits 7-inchs with Spazz, Corrupted, Noothgrush and Agathocles, and their unreleased Relapse Records EP.

Black Army Jacket reunited for 2010's Best Friends Day festival in Richmond, VA. The band's first set in over 12 years will be on August 19, on the first day of the festival. They also played a NYC show on August 4 at The Cake Shop. The lineup was Lawi, Orlando, Ramirez and Witte.

In 2014, Ramirez co-founded No Echo, a music website.

== Partial Discography ==
- Closed Casket Discography (2004, Black Box Recordings)
- 222 (1999, Chainsaw Safety/Reservoir Records) *reissued by Brainscan Records in 2015
- Split 7-inch w/ Agathocles (1999, Deaf American Recordings)
- The Path of Two Swords As One 7-inch (1998, Chainsaw Safety)
- Split 7-inch w/ Noothgrush (1997, Monkeybite zine)
- Split 7-inch w/ Corrupted (1997, Frigidity Discos)
- Split 7-inch w/ Spazz (1997, Dogprint zine)
- Split 10-inch w/ Hemlock (1997, Go-Kart Records)
- Demo (1996)

== Band members ==
- Andrew Orlando (guitars)
- Carlos Ramirez (bass, vocals)
- Rob Lawi (vocals)
- Dave Witte (drums)

=== Other members ===
- Dan Crowell (drums)
- Chris Russo (bass)
- John Adubato (guitars)
- Tom Hayden (bass)
