= Vitamin X =

Dutch hardcore punk band

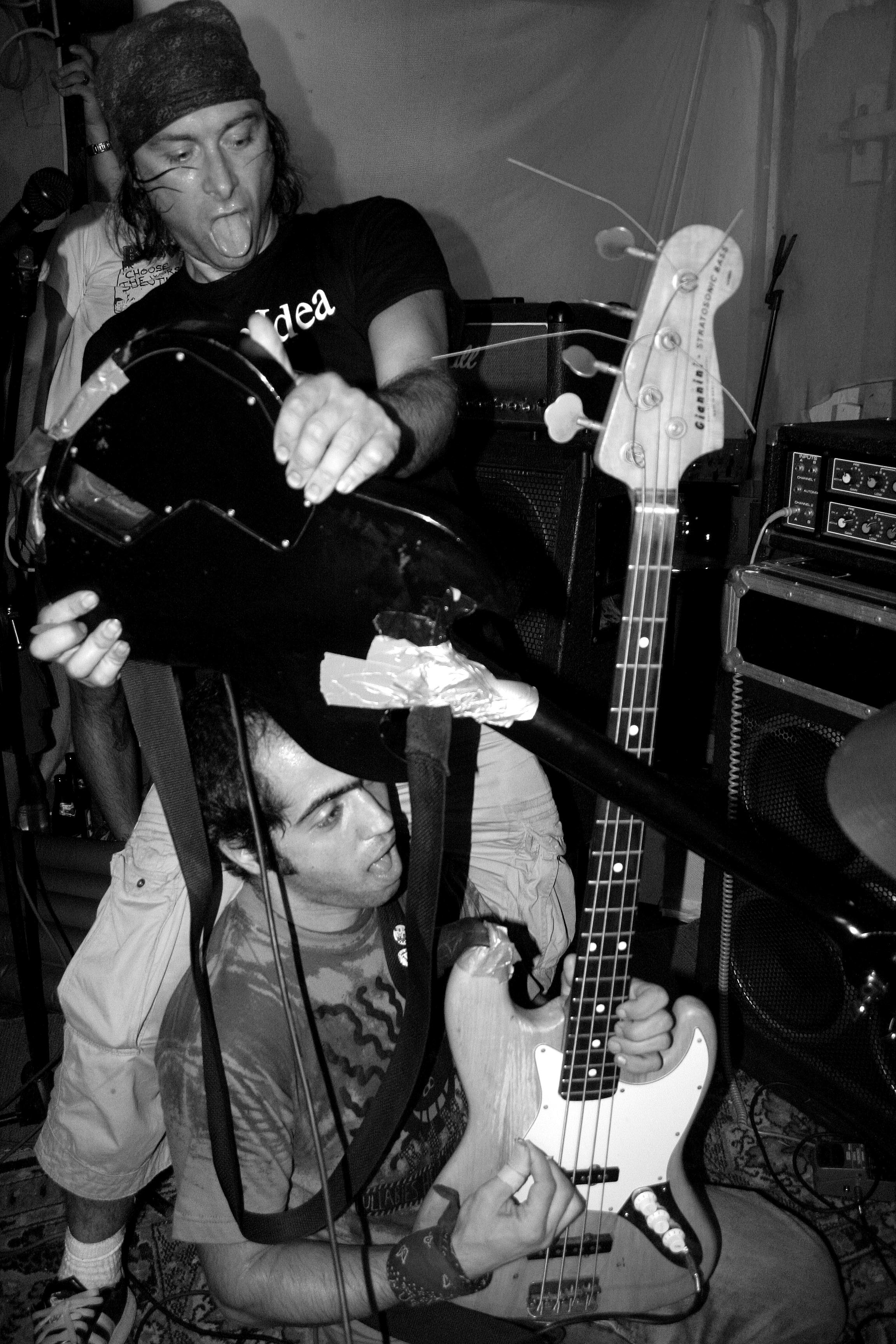
- Marc and Alex performing live at Mainz concert, Germany in August 2007

Background information
- Origin: Amsterdam, Netherlands
- Genres: Hardcore punk, thrashcore, bandana thrash
- Years active: 1997–present
- Labels: Havoc, Tankcrimes, Thrashbastard, AgiPunk, Southern Lord
- Members: Marko; Marc; Alex; Danny
- Past members: Wolfi; Wimmy "Zero"; Johan X Eric
- Website: vitaminx.bandcamp.com

Vitamin X (abbreviated VX) is a Dutch hardcore punk band from Amsterdam formed in 1997. Their sound is characterized by hardcore punk mixed with thrash metal, 1970s rock riffs and guitar solos. The members are straight edge but this does not reflect their lyrics or music. Their current line-up consists of four members: Marko (vocals), Alex (bass guitar), Danny (drums), and Marc (songwriter, guitar).

Known for their socio-political lyrical themes and energetic live performances, the band recorded several seminal full-length albums and singles on various international labels, including US label Havoc Records. The band has completed multiple tours of North America, South America, Europe, Japan, Australia, Indonesia, Philippines, Mexico, and Russia. In 2001 and 2004 they played CBGB's, New York to a sold-out crowd. At a 2006 MTV live studio performance in Brasil a riot broke out after the band smashed their instruments.

Their 2008 album Full Scale Assault was recorded in Chicago by Steve Albini, famous for recording Nirvana, Iggy Pop and The Stooges, Led Zeppelin's Page and Plant, Neurosis, etc. Featuring a guest appearance by Negative Approach singer John Brannon and artwork by John Baizley of Baroness. It received critical acclaim from publications such as Metal Maniacs, Maximumrocknroll, Profane Existence, Suburban Voice, Exclaim!, and many more, several of them naming it as one of the best hardcore punk albums of 2008/2009.

In 2012 they released the album About to Crack, also recorded by Steve Albini and artwork by John Baizley.

Besides touring around the world the band plays for 10,000s of people on some of the biggest heavy music festivals. They headlined Fluff Fest several times, as well as Exit, Obscene Extreme, Resist to Exist, and many more. In 2012 they play Europe's biggest 'extreme music festival' Hellfest featuring acts such as Ozzy Osbourne, Megadeth, Guns N' Roses but also punk acts like GBH, Discharge, Tragedy and Refused. In 2013 they were among the headliners of the Baltimore Soundstage at Maryland Deathfest, the biggest fest of its kind in North America, playing together with Infest, The Melvins, Carcass, Venom, Pentagram. After playing at 2014's Temples Fest in Bristol they again played Hellfest in 2015 with Motörhead, Billy Idol, ZZ Top, Judas Priest, and Alice Cooper.

In 2018 they sign for Southern Lord Records and release their sixth album Age of Paranoia featuring J Mascis of Dinosaur Jr and Bubba Dupree of Void and Soundgarden.

== Discography ==
Studio Albums

- 2000 See Thru Their Lies
- 2002 Down The Drain
- 2004 Bad Trip
- 2008 Full Scale Assault
- 2012 About To Crack
- 2018 Age of Paranoia
- 2026 Ride The Apocalypse

EPs

- 1998 Straight Edge Crew
- 1999 Once Upon a Time...
- 2001 We Came Here For Fun
- 2001 People That Bleed
- 2003 split 7-inch with Blind Society (King Friday)
- 2003 Random Violence (Japanese tour CD, Good Luck)
- 2005 Rip It Out (Havoc)

They have also released multiple "best of" collections and discography tapes, mainly for overseas tours.

== Members ==
- Marko – vocals
- Marc – guitar, songwriter
- Alex – bass
- Danny – drums

=== Former members ===
- Geert Jan – drums
- Wimmy "Zero" Koster – drums
- Paolo G. - drums
- Boka (Ratos De Porao) – drums
- Johan X – drums
- Wolfi – drums
- Eric 'Sunk' Ankersmit – guitar
