= Hazardous Mutation =

Studio album by Municipal Waste
- Released: September 20, 2005
- Genre: Crossover thrash
- Length: 26:10
- Label: Earache Records
- Producer: Nick Poulos

Municipal Waste chronology
Waste 'Em All (2003)	Hazardous Mutation (2005)	The Art of Partying (2007)

Hazardous Mutation is the second album by the American crossover thrash band Municipal Waste. It is also the band's debut on Earache Records. The album's main theme is zombies, other monsters, and partying all tied together with humorous yet brutal lyrics. It was also released as a special edition with a bonus live DVD. It was the first album produced by Nick Poulos.

== Background ==
After the release of Waste 'em All, Municipal Waste, whose name comes from a garbage truck, were deemed a "Party Thrash" band. In the Hazardous Mutation Bonus DVD the members of the band were asked where that came from. Ryan Waste responded, "We just party, and we just thrash. Someone else put that together". The band was also asked about how they are reminiscent of the 80's thrash scene, and what they think they bring to the scene that's new. The band responded stating that the bring "life" back to the scene with this new style. They "take what bands were doing in six minute songs and cramming them into two".

== Influences ==
Each member of the band listed some of their influences on this album in the Hazardous Mutation Bonus DVD. In the interviews on the DVD Tony Foresta stated he was influenced by Caustic Christ, Baroness, Dirty Rotten Imbeciles, and the Accüsed. Ryan Waste was influenced by many underground bands such as Razor, Hallows Eve, Menacer and Whiplash. Dave Witte was influenced by Slayer and AC/DC. Land Phil's influences come mostly from death metal, i.e. Cannibal Corpse, Obituary, and Deicide. Overall influences shared by the band include Exodus, Vio-lence, Forbidden, and Annihilation Time.

== Cover art ==
The cover art was done by Ed Repka, who has done artwork for other metal bands such as Megadeth, Death, Massacre, Nuclear Assault, Merciless Death, etc. The cover is related to the song "Hazardous Mutation", in which people without chemical suits are turned into mutants. The surviving humans are being chased by a mob of mutants in a red Kamaz dump-truck.

== Critical reception ==
Professional ratings
Review scores
Source	Rating
AllMusic	4/5 stars
Blabbermouth.net	8/10 stars
Stylus Magazine	B−
Lambgoat	9/10
Metal.de	8/10
Ox-Fanzine	8/10

The album was met with positive reception from critics Ox-Fanzine wrote "Moreover, since Municipal Waste know how to arrange their songs in a way that remains engaging—moving beyond the usual stop-and-go dynamics—and manage to surprise the listener with sparingly used melodic guitar runs, *Hazardous Mutation* stands out from the crowd of similar albums." Eduardo Rivadavia of AllMusic wrote "Even though it's a little too early to file Hazardous Mutation with any of the crossover genre's unchallenged ancient classics, suffice to say that, if you were ever a fan of mid'80s gems such as Agnostic Front's Cause for Alarm, the Cro-Mags' Age of Quarrel, or Murphy's Law's eponymous debut, prepare for a happy visit to your past over the course of these bruising 26 minutes." Similarly Metal.de added "This record could pull off a feat that is widely considered impossible these days: It could appeal just as much to the battle-vest-clad veteran—complete with an Anthrax *Among the Living* backpatch—as it does to the quintessential Metalcore kid. This is speedy Thrash-Core at its absolute finest—a release so solid that the entire album serves as a top recommendation."

In 2024 Loudwire retrospectively dubbed Hazardous Mutation the best thrash metal album of 2005.

== Track listing ==
No.	Title	Length
1.	"Intro/Deathripper"	2:19
2.	"Unleash the Bastards"	1:57
3.	"The Thing"	1:53
4.	"Blood Drive"	1:13
5.	"Accelerated Vision"	1:26
6.	"Guilty of Being Tight"	1:53
7.	"Set to Destruct"	2:01
8.	"Hazardous Mutation"	1:20
9.	"Nailed Casket"	1:36
10.	"Abusement Park"	1:00
11.	"Black Ice"	0:24
12.	"Mind Eraser"	2:17
13.	"Terror Shark"	1:43
14.	"The Thrashin' of the Christ"	2:30
15.	"Bangover"	2:38
Total length:		26:10

=== Bonus live DVD ===
1. "Intro"
2. "Deathripper"
3. "Drunk as Shit"
4. "Mind Eraser"
5. "Unleash the Bastards"
6. "The Thrashin' of the Christ"
7. "Sweet Attack"
8. "Mutants of War"
9. "Blood Drive"
10. "Accelerated Vision"
11. "New Song"
12. "Terror Shark"
13. "Toxic Revolution"
14. "Substitute Creature"
15. "Waste 'Em All"
16. "Bangover"

== Live performances ==
In the Hazardous Mutation Bonus DVD live performances are not only discussed, but they are seen. Municipal Waste uses insane gimmicks such as started the show with a Wizard who Raps, Putting their drummer, Dave Witte, in a shark costume, bringing a trampoline on stage for people to use for stage diving and bringing beach balls and boogey boards for crowd surfing. In the interview on the DVD when asked why people come to their shows they talk about all these insane gimmicks and how their fans actively participate by dressing up and running on stage having a good time. They also claim people come to their shows because they give away free beer.

== Cultural reference ==
The song "Guilty of Being Tight" opens with a quote from the horror movie Phantasm. Its name is an homage to the song "Guilty of Being White" by hardcore band Minor Threat.

== Personnel ==
- Tony Foresta – lead vocals
- Ryan Waste – guitars, backing vocals
- Philip "Land Phil" Hall – bass, backing vocals
- Dave Witte – drums
