= The Inalienable Dreamless =

- Keep case cover

Studio album by Discordance Axis
- Released: May 23, 2000
- Recorded: December 11–15, 1999
- Studio: Trax East (South River, New Jersey)
- Genre: Grindcore; mathcore
- Length: 23:21
- Label: Hydra Head
- Producer: Jon D'Uva, Discordance Axis

Discordance Axis chronology
Jouhou (1997)	The Inalienable Dreamless (2000)

The Inalienable Dreamless is the third and final studio album by grindcore band Discordance Axis, released on May 23, 2000, through Hydra Head Records. It has since become one of the most acclaimed grindcore albums of all time. The album, along with its production history, was made the subject of the 2012 book Compiling Autumn: The Making of Discordance Axis' "The Inalienable Dreamless", a limited edition paperback that was released to aid the Japanese Red Cross Society. The album was repressed on black and blue vinyl for Record Store Day in 2011.

Many of the tracks refer to elements from the anime/manga franchise Neon Genesis Evangelion, including "Angel Present", "Pattern Blue", "The End of Rebirth", and "The Third Children".

== Background and production ==
After the release of the 1997 album Jouhou, guitarist Rob Marton left the band right before they could start their Japanese tour, citing schedule conflicts with his job as a main reason. To fill in his place, the band hired guitarist Steve Procopio for the tour. The band would then take a two-year hiatus before reforming in 1999 to work on new material, Marton now back in the band. The trio was then offered by Hydra Head Records after label head Aaron Turner listened to Jouhou.

The Inalienable Dreamless was recorded, mixed, and mastered in four days in December 1999 at Trax East. It was completed on December 15, 1999. Originally, Steve Evetts was to engineer the record, however he quit and left the studio before the band could start the sessions, so Jon D'Uva was hired last minute to replace him. During the sessions, D'Uva added a subharmonic bass synthesizer effect to the guitar recordings, giving the recordings a more "full" sound. The album was made available to order online, first on compact disc and later on vinyl, on May 23, 2000. Discordance Axis also gave out copies of The Inalienable Dreamless at their show at CBGB's in New York City on June 3, 2000.

== Artwork, packaging, and lyrics ==
The CD edition of the album was packaged in a keep case, which is normally associated with DVDs. The booklet included with the CD release includes lyrics in unique handwritten fonts displayed over pictures of the oceanside taken by photographer Scott Kinkade. The photos were taken at Sea Bright, New Jersey, which was where drummer Dave Witte was living during the production of the album. Kinkade was hired to take the photos because he had been friends with the band ever since they met each other at a show in 1996. The LP edition of the album too featured the booklet, and was pressed on black and clear vinyl. The clear edition was a pressing of only 100 copies. All LP editions featured etchings in the run-out grooves that read "Are You My Pal...Danny?"

Lyrical themes of the album include loneliness and despair, a departure from the group's earlier politically motivated works. The lyrics also include references to, and were heavily inspired by, the anime series Neon Genesis Evangelion, in particular the films Neon Genesis Evangelion: Death & Rebirth and End of Evangelion. Authors Philip K. Dick and Joseph Conrad are referenced as well.

== Reception and legacy ==
Professional ratings
Review scores
Source	Rating
AllMusic	4.5/5 stars
Brave Words & Bloody Knuckles	10/10
Chronicles of Chaos	9.5/10
Exclaim!	Favorable
Metal Hammer	7/10
Punknews.org	4.5/5 stars
Stylus Magazine	A

Since its initial release, the album has received critical acclaim from critics, and is considered by many to be one of the best grindcore albums ever made. In 2009, Decibel magazine included the album in its "Hall of Fame" list. William York of AllMusic awarded the album a near perfect score of 4.5 out of 5 and "Recommended Pick" status, praising the band's musicianship. Greg Patt of Brave Words gave the album a perfect 10/10 score, complimenting the "painfully emotional and poetic" lyrics and Dave Witte's drumming. In 2009, Decibel ranked the album at number 12 on its list of the "Top 100 Greatest Metal Albums of the Decade", with Terrorizer ranking it at number 34 on its equivalent list.

== Track listing ==
No.	Title	Length
1.	"Castration Rite"	0:58
2.	"The Inalienable Dreamless"	0:41
3.	"Sound Out the Braille"	0:32
4.	"Oratorio in Grey"	0:54
5.	"Vacuum Sleeve"	1:02
6.	"Angel Present"	1:28
7.	"The Necropolitan"	1:42
8.	"Pattern Blue"	1:27
9.	"The End of Rebirth"	1:04
10.	"Loveless"	1:27
11.	"Radiant Arkham"	1:14
12.	"Use of Weapons"	0:35
13.	"Compiling Autumn"	0:48
14.	"Jigsaw"	2:08
15.	"The Third Children"	2:16
16.	"A Leaden Stride to Nowhere"	4:07
17.	"Drowned"	0:58
Total length:		23:21

== Personnel ==
Discordance Axis

- Jon Chang - vocals
- Rob Marton - guitars
- Dave Witte - drums

Production

- Jon D'Uva - engineering, recording
- Scott Kinkade - photography
