= Born/Dead =

American hardcore punk band

Born/Dead is a hardcore punk band formed in late 2000 in Oakland, California, consisting of Bill Jackson playing drums, Wyatt Culbertson (both formerly of Chemical Imbalance) playing bass and splitting vocal duties with guitarist Will Kinser. Will had been a member of the short-lived Santa Cruz/San Francisco, California band No Options. No Options had broken up suddenly upon the death of member Chad W. Rickley. All of Born/Dead's records have been dedicated to his memory and they still play No Options songs in their live set.

Born/Dead's style of DIY punk is influenced by hardcore punk, peace punk and some crust punk. They sound similar to Aus Rotten, Econochrist and Tragedy.

In 2001, after playing extensively in the San Francisco Bay Area, the band released their debut five-song 7-inch EP 24 Hostages as the first release by No Options Records, a label started by Will. After recording the initial tracks for a full-length album themselves, the band approached the long-running and successful Bay Area label, Prank Records to release the record. The nine-song Our Darkest Fears Now Haunt Us LP/CD was released in 2003 and featured a heavier sound than the debut. The LP's release lead the band to its first major U.S. tour and was quickly followed by a recording session at Burnt Ramen studios produced by Nate Smith and Greg Wilkinson of Brainoil, these songs were released on a split LP with Seattle's Consume, released on German label Yellowdog Records. This was followed closely by a 5-week tour of Europe with Consume. Levon from Shitlist and Deathraid played drums on the European tour.

In 2004, original drummer Bill Jackson left the band to concentrate on his other group Strung Up and was replaced by Josh Carman. The band prepared new material and in 2005 returned with a limited edition five-song 12-inch EP which they sold on a series of tours in the United States and Europe. This new material was more experimental than previous releases and some songs were re-released on a 7-inch EP on Prank Records. In 2006, the band toured the west coast with The Subhumans and World Inferno Friendship Society. They Followed this a split 7-inch EP on Tankcrimes records with San Francisco's Peligro Social. Will is also involved in No Options Records.

Born/Dead completed recording of a new 7 song LP entitled "The Final Collapse" at Ear Hammer studios in Oakland, and was scheduled to tour throughout most of 2007 to 2008 in over 28 countries, this tour saw the Markley Hart Econochrist play the Australian and New Zealand leg of tour with Pisschrist. In 2009 Born/Dead toured 5 weeks in Europe with Mackey Iveli of Peligro Social on drums.

2014 Born/Dead toured 7 countries in 12 days.

== Discography ==
=== LPs ===
- "Our Darkest Fears Now Haunt Us" Prank Records(2002)
- "Repetition" limited tour 12-inch Prank Records (2005)
- "Split LP with Consume" Yellow Dog Records (2003) Germany
- "The Final Collapse" Prank Records (2007)

=== CDs ===
- "Our Darkest Fears Now Haunt Us" Prank Records(2002)
- "Repetition-Endless War" Prank Records (2006)
- "The Final Collapse"Prank Records (2007)

=== EPs ===
- "24 Hostages" No Options Records (2001)
- "Repetition/Fear" Prank Records (2005)
- "Assault-split EP with Peligro Social" Tankcrimes (2006)

=== Compilation ===
- "Disturbing The Peace" V/A LP Six Weeks Records (2003)
