= The Fatal Feast =

Studio album by Municipal Waste
- Released: April 10, 2012
- Genre: Crossover thrash; thrash metal
- Length: 37:44
- Label: Nuclear Blast
- Producer: Municipal Waste

Municipal Waste chronology
Massive Aggressive (2009)	The Fatal Feast (2012)	Slime and Punishment (2017)

Professional ratings
Aggregate scores
Source	Rating
Metacritic	78/100
Review scores
Source	Rating
About	link
Blistering	link
Rock Sound	link
Thrash Hits	link
Peek from the Pit	link
Metal Injection	8.2/10
Blabbermouth.net	7.5/10
Ultimate Guitar	9/10
Ox-Fanzine	4/5 stars

The Fatal Feast (also referred to as "The Fatal Feast (Waste in Space)") is the fifth studio album by American crossover thrash band Municipal Waste. It was released on April 10, 2012 through Nuclear Blast. The album debuted at number 1 on the Billboard New Artist chart. The artwork was done by Justin Osbourn of Slasher Design.

== Background and recording ==
In the June of 2011 Municipal Waste signed with Nuclear Blast and began working on the album during the Summer of that year. Fatal Feast was Municipal Wastes longest album at the time of its release, in an interview with Guitar World guitarist Ryan Wastes commented on the albums length:

I think we just wanted to give fans the full package and not skimp on anything for the new label. We actually recorded way more than that. We took a year off to write and record the record, which we've never done, so we ended up writing more than enough songs. We liked so many of them that we just ended up with a lot of songs on the record. We ended up recording seven more that didn't even make it on there.

When it comes to the albums title Waste added:

We had the title "Fatal Feast" for years, even before Waste 'em All; we just sat on it. We had a different song written with different lyrics than you hear on the album, but we kept the title. With the Waste it's funny, we'll come up with an idea like, The fourth album's gonna be the space album.

The record features guest appearances by John Connelly, Steve Moore (ZOMBI), and vocalist Tim Barry (ex-Avail).

== Cover art ==
The albums cover art was created by Justin Osbourn of Slasher Design, who worked closely with guitarist Ryan Waste to create the artwork. The figures on the cover were called Waste-oids, as for the beer bottles on the cover Osbourn stated those were in reference to right number he would drink on a night that he would call "a pretty damn good night."

== Critical reception ==
The received positive reception receiving a 78/100 on Metacritic. Metal Injection wrote "This is standard fare for Municipal Waste as they stick to a common formula much like the Motorheads, AC/DCs, and Slayers of this music scene, however they currently do their thing much better than the bands just mentioned. About as consistent a band as I have seen in the metal scene, especially when the subject matter goes from nuclear waste, to beer, to zombies, and just about anything you can think of similar to this." Blabbermouth.net added "The Fatal Feast" is one more example of why MUNICIPAL WASTE is so damn difficult to dislike, assuming one would even entertain such a thought. Most would be hard pressed to call "The Fatal Feast" an essential crossover album. Calling it a very good one however is easy."

== Track listing ==
All tracks are written by Municipal Waste.

No.	Title	Length
1.	"Waste in Space (Main Title)"	0:57
2.	"Repossession"	2:25
3.	"New Dead Masters"	2:48
4.	"Unholy Abductor"	1:19
5.	"Idiot Check"	2:11
6.	"Covered in Sick/The Barfer"	3:10
7.	"You're Cut Off"	1:14
8.	"Authority Complex"	2:22
9.	"Standards and Practices"	3:01
10.	"Crushing Chest Wound"	2:30
11.	"The Monster with 21 Faces"	1:48
12.	"Jesus Freaks"	2:24
13.	"The Fatal Feast"	3:09
14.	"12 Step Program"	1:35
15.	"Death Tax"	2:51
16.	"Residential Disaster"	4:07

== Personnel ==
- Tony Foresta – vocals
- Ryan Waste – guitars
- Dave Witte – drums
- Land Phil – bass

Additional personnel

- Steve Moore – samples on "Waste in Space (Main Title)" and "The Fatal Feast"
- John Connelly – vocals on "The Fatal Feast"
- Tim Barry – vocals on "Standards and Practices"

== Charts ==
Chart (2012)	Peak position
UK Rock & Metal Albums (OCC)	23
UK Independent Album Breakers (OCC)	12
US Top Album Sales (Billboard)	152
US Heatseekers Albums (Billboard)	1
US Independent Albums (Billboard)	32
