= Age of Paranoia =

Studio album by Vitamin X
- Released: 18 May 2018
- Studios: ARC Studios; Amsterdam, NL
- Genres: Hardcore punk, crossover thrash, thrashcore
- Length: 27:58
- Label: Southern Lord Records
- Producer: Igor Wouters

Vitamin X chronology
About to Crack (2012)	Age of Paranoia (2018)

Professional ratings
Review scores
Source	Rating
Punknews.org	4.5/5 stars
Rock Hard	8.5/10
Ox-Fanzine	8/10
Allschools	7/10 stars
Salad Days Magazine	8.5/10 stars

Age of Paranoia is the sixth studio album by Dutch punk hardcore crossover thrash band Vitamin X. It was released on 18 May 2018 through Southern Lord Records.

== Recording and release ==
Age of Paranoia was recorded at Amsterdam Recording Company in Amsterdam, Netherlands and mixed by Igor Wouters. It was announced in March 2018 that the band had signed with Southern Lord Records. On 12 April the track "Modern Man" was premiered as a single through Bandcamp. The full album was released on 18 May 2020 on compact disc, LP, and via digital download and streaming. A second song "Flip the Switch" was premiered on 27 April through Revolver featuring special guest J Mascis of Dinosaur Jr. playing a two-minute-plus guitar solo played on Emmerik's 1980 Gibson SG. Another guest on the album is guitarist Bubba Dupree formerly of Void (band), Soundgarden and more recently Brant Bjork playing on the song "Rollercoaster Ride".

== Track listing ==
All tracks are written by Marc Emmerik, except where noted.

No.	Title	Length
1.	"Modern Man"	1.21
2.	"Rollercoaster Ride"	1:33
3.	"Age of Paranoia"	2:45
4.	"Human Plague"	0:41
5.	"No One"	1:35
6.	"Flip the Switch"	2:12
7.	"Short Circuit"	2:25
8.	"Speak No Evil"	1:01
9.	"Deranged Degenerate"	1:58
10.	"Reverse Midas Touch"	2:16
11.	"Media Messiah"	1:49
12.	"Road Warrior" (Lyrics: Emmerik/Koutsman)	1:42
13.	"Bounce Back"	0:50
14.	"Leave Me Alone"	1:35
15.	"Rock N Roll Destroyer"	1:43
16.	"Shock Value"	2:32

== Personnel ==
Vitamin X

- Marko Korac – vocals
- Marc Joseph Emmerik – guitar, vocals on "Road Warrior" and "Leave Me Alone"
- Alex Koutsman – bass guitar
- Danny Schneiker – drums

Guests

- J Mascis – guitar (on "Flip The Switch")
- Bubba Dupree – guitar (on "Rollercoaster Ride")

Production

- Produced by Igor Wouters
- Mastered by Dan Randall
- Lay-out by Marc Emmerik
- Artwork by Marald Van Haasteren
