= Soundtrack to the Personal Revolution =

Soundtrack To The Personal Revolution

Studio album by Burnt by the Sun
- Released: January 22, 2002
- Recorded: 21–29 August 2001
- Studio: Trax East
- Genre: Metalcore, mathcore, post-hardcore, extreme metal
- Length: 29:16
- Label: Relapse Records
- Producer: Matt Bayles, Burnt By The Sun

Burnt by the Sun chronology
Burnt by the Sun EP (2001)	Soundtrack To The Personal Revolution (2002)	The Perfect Is the Enemy of the Good (2003)

Professional ratings
Review scores
Source	Rating
Allmusic	3/5 stars

Soundtrack To The Personal Revolution is the debut full-length album for the band Burnt by the Sun, released on Relapse Records.

== Track listing ==
- All songs were written by Burnt by the Sun.
1. "Dracula With Glasses" – 1:46
2. "Soundtrack to the Worst Movie Ever" – 2:32
3. "Dow Jones and the Temple of Doom" – 2:48
4. "Boston Tea Bag Party" – 2:40
5. "Shooter McGavin" – 2:48
6. "Mortimer" – 2:45
7. "Don Knotts" – 3:22
8. "Famke" – 2:59
9. "Human Steamroller" – 3:17
10. "Rebecca" – 4:14

"Rebecca" ends at 3:02, followed by silence until 4:00 and a hidden outtake.

== Personnel ==
- Mike Olender – vocals
- John Adubato – guitar
- Chris Rascio – guitar
- Ted Patterson – bass
- Dave Witte – drums

== Production ==
- Produced By Matt Bayles & Burnt By The Sun
- Engineered By Matt Bayles
- Mastered By Alan Douches
