= Electrified Brain =

Studio album by Municipal Waste
- Released: July 1, 2022
- Genre: Crossover thrash
- Length: 33:51
- Label: Nuclear Blast
- Producer: Arthur Rizk, Municipal Waste

Municipal Waste chronology
Slime and Punishment (2017)	Electrified Brain (2022)

Singles from Electrified Brain
- 1. "Grave Dive" Released: April 1, 2022; 2. "High Speed Steel" Released: May 18, 2022; 3. "Electrified Brain" Released: June 2, 2022

Electrified Brain is the seventh studio album by American crossover thrash band Municipal Waste, released on July 1, 2022.

== Background and singles ==
On October 29, 2021, Municipal Waste resigned with Nuclear Blast Records and announced their seventh studio album (which had not been named yet) would be released sometime in 2022.

On April 1, 2022, the band officially announced the album’s release date along with the album’s first single "Grave Dive." An animated music video created by Pierre Mousquet was later released for the song on July 26, featuring cameos of pop culture figures such as Skeletor and Lemmy. The second single "High Speed Steel" was released on May 18, alongside an official lyric video. Rhythm guitarist Ryan Waste stated that the song is "their ode to an era when heavy metal was transitioning into a faster form."

The third and final single the title track was released on June 2, the song was accompanied with a horror inspired music video directed by FX artist Norman Cabrera. In a press release Waste also commented on the meaning of the song stating "Electrified Brain’ is a tale of revenge and redemption, continuing the concept of our song ‘Mental Shock’ rounding out the ‘Deathripper Trilogy.’ It’s about being wrongfully accused and stripped of your rights, only to overcome and break free through the electric power of heavy music."

== Composition ==
The band first began working on the album prior to the COVID-19 pandemic, however when the pandemic went into full effect and stopped the band from touring they used the extra down time to their advantage. Guitarist Ryan Waste commented "It allowed us to focus on putting together structured songs, we wanted to diversify some of the tempos and bring in some new dynamics that we hadn’t ventured into before." Municipal Waste recorded the album Philadelphia, Pennsylvania with producer Arthur Rizk. The sessions marked the first time the band reunited in person after a year. When it came to writing material lead singer Tony Foresta stated "Our approach to writing it matches the lyrical content insofar as not trying to overthink things all of the time and remembering to enjoy what you’re doing."

== Critical reception ==
Professional ratings
Review scores
Source	Rating
Blabbermouth.net	8.5/10
Kerrang!	4/5
Metal Hammer	5/7
Metal Injection	7.5/10
New Noise Magazine	Positive
Ox-Fanzine	4/5 stars
Metal.de	8/10

Metal Injection said: "There aren’t any huge surprises, but tempo shifts and a few twists and turns make this album anything but predictable." Kerrang! wrote: "Those looking for any kind of genre-reinventing revelation – or, indeed, even the slightest subtlety – need not apply. But for those of us after a band who still kill the old way, Municipal Waste remain the ultimate soundtrack for smashing cans and banging heads." New Noise Magazine gave a positive review and called "Blood Vessel/Boat Jail" the best song on the album. Blabbermouth.net said: "[...] "Electrified Brain" is a brilliant blend of the expected and the ever-so-slightly unexpected."

Metal.de wrote "With Electrified Brain The "hit factor" may have been higher on *Slime and Punishment*, but the mosh factor remains high, and the occasional detours into heavy metal pleasantly enliven the band's sound."

== Track listing ==
No.	Title	Length
1.	"Electrified Brain"	2:45
2.	"Demoralizer"	2:54
3.	"Last Crawl"	2:28
4.	"Grave Dive"	2:31
5.	"The Bite"	1:37
6.	"High Speed Steel"	2:31
7.	"Thermonuclear Protection"	3:02
8.	"Blood Vessel/Boat Jail"	1:55
9.	"Crank the Heat"	2:42
10.	"Restless and Wicked"	2:24
11.	"Ten Cent Beer Night"	2:15
12.	"Barreled Rage"	2:22
13.	"Putting on Errors"	1:30
14.	"Paranormal Janitor"	2:55

== Personnel ==
Municipal Waste

- Tony Foresta – lead vocals
- Nick Poulos – lead guitar
- Ryan Waste – rhythm guitar, backing vocals
- Phil Hall – bass, backing vocals
- Dave Witte – drums

Guest vocalists

- Blaine Cook (on "The Bite")
- Barney Greenway (on "Putting on Errors")

== Charts ==
Chart (2022)	Peak position
Swiss Albums (Schweizer Hitparade)	53
UK Independent Albums (OCC)	19
UK Rock & Metal Albums (OCC)	11
UK Independent Album Breakers (OCC)	6
UK Album Sales (OCC)	89
UK Physical Albums (OCC)	87
