= Using Sickness as a Hero =

EP by Human Remains
- Released: 1996
- Studio: Trax East Studios (South East, New Jersey)
- Genre: Grindcore; death metal; avant-garde metal
- Length: 17:00
- Label: Relapse
- Producer: Steve Evetts, Human Remains

Human Remains chronology
When Forever Becomes Until... (1995)	Using Sickness as a Hero (1996)	Where Were You When (2002)

Using Sickness as a Hero is an EP by American grindcore band Human Remains. It was released in 1996 through Relapse Records. Contrasting with the big budget death metal productions of its era, the EP is considered as an "overlooked classic" by many underground grindcore and death metal followers.

The EP has largely been out of print since it has been replaced by the Where Were You When anthology. In 2015, however, Relapse Records repressed the recording on vinyl with added demo tracks as part of its 25th anniversary reissue series.

== Critical reception ==
Professional ratings
Review scores
Source	Rating
AllMusic	3/5 stars
Chronicles of Chaos	7/10

AllMusic critic William York described the record "as close as Human Remains ever got to making a real album" and thought that the band "sound both experimental and violently intense at the same time, mixing together blastbeat sections, heavy mid-tempo breakdowns, and strange, almost robotic-sounding parts where the guitars are making strange, clipped tapping noises." York also noted "the refreshing absence of any clichéd death metal or grindcore riffs throughout the recording." Chronicles of Chaos' Brian Meloon described the record as "a good effort," but found it "a little too unfocussed for its own good" and sometimes "too chaotic to retain the heaviness that they appear to be going for."

== Track listing ==
No.	Title	Length
1.	"Weeding Out the Thorns"	2:36
2.	"Waste of Time"	1:43
3.	"Rote"	3:29
4.	"Chewed Up and Spit Out"	2:33
5.	"Swollen"	3:31
6.	"Human"	2:29
7.	"Beyond Human Perception"	0:39

2015 reissue bonus tracks
No.	Title	Length
8.	"Chewed Up and Spit Out" (demo)	2:47
9.	"Rote" (demo)	3:31
10.	"Weeding Out the Thorns" (demo)	2:44
11.	"Swollen" (demo)	3:34
12.	"Human" (demo)	2:35
Total length:		33:11

== Personnel ==
Human Remains

- Paul Miller – vocals
- Steve Procopio – guitar
- Jim Baglino – guitar
- William Carl Black – bass
- Dave Witte – drums

Production and artwork

- Steve Evett - production, engineering, mixing
- Human Remains - production, mixing
- Wes Benscoter - cover artwork
- Bill Yurkiewickz - photography, mastering
- Eric Horst - graphic design
- Dave Shirk - mastering
