= Massive Aggressive =

Studio album by Municipal Waste
- Released: August 25, 2009
- Recorded: March 2009 at Red Planet Studios in Richmond, Virginia
- Genre: Crossover thrash
- Length: 28:31
- Label: Earache
- Producer: Zeuss

Municipal Waste chronology
The Art of Partying (2007)	Massive Aggressive (2009)	The Fatal Feast (2012)

Professional ratings
Review scores
Source	Rating
Allmusic	link
Blabbermouth	link
Fast Forward Weekly	(favorable) link
Kerrang	4/5 stars

Massive Aggressive is the fourth studio album by American thrash metal band Municipal Waste. It was released on August 25, 2009 through Earache Records. The album artwork was done by Andrei Bouzikov, bassist of Deadfall.

== Track listing ==
All tracks are written by Municipal Waste.

No.	Title	Length
1.	"Masked by Delirium"	1:56
2.	"Mech-Cannibal"	2:20
3.	"Divine Blasphemer"	1:59
4.	"Massive Aggressive"	1:42
5.	"Wolves of Chernobyl"	2:29
6.	"Relentless Threat"	2:37
7.	"The Wrath of the Severed Head"	1:46
8.	"Upside Down Church"	2:29
9.	"Shredded Offering"	2:28
10.	"Media Skeptic"	1:33
11.	"Horny for Blood"	1:38
12.	"Wrong Answer"	2:32
13.	"Acid Sentence"	3:02

== Personnel ==
- Tony Foresta: Lead Vocals
- Ryan Waste: Guitars
- "Land Phil": Bass, Backing Vocals
- Dave Witte: Drums
