= The Perfect Is the Enemy of the Good =

The Perfect Is The Enemy Of The Good

Studio album by Burnt by the Sun
- Released: May 2003
- Recorded: 2003
- Studio: Trax East Studio (South River, New Jersey)
- Genre: Metalcore, mathcore, grindcore
- Length: 72:54
- Label: Relapse Records
- Producer: Burnt By The Sun and Matt Bayles

Burnt by the Sun chronology
Soundtrack to the Personal Revolution (2002)	The Perfect Is The Enemy Of The Good (2003)	Heart of Darkness (2009)

Professional ratings
Review scores
Source	Rating
Allmusic	4/5 stars

The Perfect Is The Enemy Of The Good is the second full-length album for the band Burnt by the Sun, released on Relapse Records.

The title is a common translation of a quotation by Voltaire:

Le mieux est l'ennemi du bien.

Literally,

The best is the enemy of the good.

From La Bégueule (1772).

== Track listing ==
1. "Abril Los Ojos" - 1:24
2. "Washington Tube Steak" - 2:58
3. "Battleship" - 3:38
4. "Forlani" - 2:39
5. "180 Proof" - 3:48
6. Untitled - 0:40
7. "Arrival Of Niburu" - 1:52
8. "Patient 957" - 2:01
9. "2012" - 3:05
10. Untitled - 0:47
11. "Spinner Dunn" - 3:31
12. "Pentagons And Pentagrams" - 2:18
13. "Revelations 101" - 3:37
14. Untitled - 40:36

The 40-minute final untitled track consists mostly of sine wave noise, with spoken audio from 14:46 to 16:50 and a six-minute hidden track from 34:36 to the end.

== Personnel ==
- Mike Olender- Vocals
- John Adubato - Guitar
- Ted Patterson - Bass
- Dave Witte - Drums
