= The Art of Partying =

Studio album by Municipal Waste
- Released: June 11, 2007
- Recorded: Planet Z Studios
- Genre: Crossover thrash; thrash metal
- Length: 32:01
- Label: Earache Records
- Producer: Zeuss; Municipal Waste

Municipal Waste chronology
Hazardous Mutation (2005)	The Art of Partying (2007)	Massive Aggressive (2009)

The Art of Partying is the third studio album from the crossover thrash band Municipal Waste, released on June 11, 2007, through Earache Records.

The album remains a popular item among collectors of physical media. The album was listed on Loudwire’s 2025 list of the 50 greatest metal albums of the 2000s.

== Background ==
Municipal Waste began writing material for The Art of Partying in late 2006 following a US tour with GWAR. After having their first two albums produced by future guitarist Nick Poulos, they instead listed in experienced producer Zeuss. Who was able to combine both the band’s live energy and their instrumental skills with a "sonic clarity" which was not present on their previous releases.

== Release history ==
A limited-edition version was also released at the same time, containing two bonus tracks and including a free woven patch.

The band released a video for "Headbanger Face Rip," which was filmed with independent B-movie house, Troma Entertainment. The Video on YouTube features footage from Troma Films, including The Toxic Avenger and its sequels. They followed up with a video for "Sadistic Magician".

== Artwork ==
The album's cover artwork "contains zombies and vomit," according to Metal Hammer. It is the bands' visual representation of the song "Chemically Altered."

== Critical reception and legacy ==
Professional ratings
Review scores
Source	Rating
AllMusic	3.5/5 stars
Punknews.org	4/5 stars
Ox-Fanzine	Positive
Ultimate Guitar	8.7/10

Eduardo Rivadavia of AllMusic wrote "The Art of Partying's modern, ultra-thrash intensity still helps to identify it as a product of the 2000s, not the '80s, and Municipal Waste boast enough songwriting imagination to comfortably refute the inevitable copycat claims." Tommy Jarvis of PunkNews added "The Art of Partying Municipal Waste has found its niche in songs about gateway drugs and cheap beer consumption at parties behind the toxic waste refinery on the wrong side of the tracks. Some may say that it's a gimmick, some may say it's an insult to fans' intelligence. But as long as The Waste can continue pumping out riffs to provide aural background to Tony Foresta's B-movie storytelling, even those of us who are anti-beer, like me, will line up to get Wasted."

In June of 2020, The Art of Partying was inducted into the Decibel Hall of Fame. The publication added "The Art of Partying defined “party thrash” in the new millennium. It not only launched Municipal Waste’s career, but revved up interest in thrash and inspired a fresh wave of youthful new bands. This one was a Hall of Famer out of the gate; it just took us a few years to make it official."

The album has also claimed multiple accolades from publication’s such as Loudwire. Who listed The Art of Partying as the best thrash metal album of 2007, the second best metal album of 2007 and listed it among the 50 best metal albums of the 2000s. In 2022 it was ranked at number 5 on MetalSucks list of the 20 best thrash metal albums since the turn of the millennium.

== Track listing ==
All songs written by Municipal Waste.

No.	Title	Length
1.	"Pre-Game"	0:39
2.	"The Art of Partying"	2:04
3.	"Headbanger Face Rip"	1:51
4.	"Mental Shock (Deathripper Part II)"	1:48
5.	"A.D.D. (Attention Deficit Destroyer)"	2:12
6.	"The Inebriator"	2:07
7.	"Lunch Hall Food Brawl"	1:58
8.	"Beer Pressure"	2:37
9.	"Chemically Altered"	2:21
10.	"Sadistic Magician"	2:09
11.	"Open Your Mind"	1:54
12.	"Radioactive Force"	2:27
13.	"Septic Detonation"	1:20
14.	"Rigorous Vengeance"	2:12
15.	"Born to Party"	4:20

Bonus Tracks
No.	Title	Length
16.	"Thrashing's My Business... And Business Is Good"	0:50
17.	"I Just Wanna Rock"	2:09
18.	"Boner City"	1:13

== Personnel ==
- Tony "Guardrail" Foresta – vocals
- Dave Witte – drums
- Philip "LandPhil" Hall – bass, vocals
- Ryan Waste – guitars, vocals, logo
- Zeuss – recording, mixing, production
- Alan Douches – mastering
- Andrei Bouzikov – front and back cover painting
- Mark Reategui – layout
- Jim "Barf" Callahan – additional logo and album font
- David Kenedy – band photos
