= The Hellpreacher =

Studio album by Birds of Prey
- Released: April 28, 2009
- Recorded: 2009
- Genre: Death 'n' roll, sludge metal
- Length: 40:54
- Label: Relapse Records
- Producer: Birds Of Prey, Vince Burke

Professional ratings
Review scores
Source	Rating
Lambgoat	6/10 stars
Metal Storm	8/10 stars
Asice e-zine	3.5/5 stars

The Hellpreacher is the third full-length album from death metal supergroup Birds of Prey. It was released April 28, 2009 through Relapse Records.

== Overview ==
The Hellpreacher is a concept album that gives the listener a first person perspective into the life a prison inmate turned priest. The album begins when the protagonist is only a child and follows him through a childhood full of rape and abuse which eventually finds the protagonist incarcerated, undergoing more physical abuse and rape. While in prison, the protagonist has a religious conversion and slowly starts to build a militaristic cult, that becomes the downfall for not only the protagonist but everyone else who is a part of this unholy lifestyle.

== Track listing ==
1. "Momma" - 3:49
2. "Juvie" - 5:52
3. "As the Field Mice Play" - 1:16
4. "Alive Inside!" - 3:19
5. "Tempt the Disciples" - 3:51
6. "Taking on our Winter Blood" - 2:13
7. "The Excavation" - 3:19
8. "Blind Faith" - 3:18
9. "False Prophet" - 3:48
10. "The Owl Closes In" - 1:58
11. "Warriors of Mud...The Hellfighters" - 3:59
12. "Giving up the Ghost" - 4:32

== Personnel ==
- Ben Hogg (Vocals)
- Eric Larson (Guitar)
- Bo Leslie (Guitar)
- Summer Welch (Bass)
- Dave Witte (Drums)
