= Brainoil =

American doom and sludge metal band

- Origin: Oakland, California, U.S.
- Genres: Sludge metal, doom metal, hardcore punk
- Years active: 1998–present
- Label: Life Is Abuse Records
- Members: Greg Wilkinson – Bass and vocals Nathan Smith – Guitar and vocals Ira Harris – Drums
- Website: brainoil.com

Brainoil is an American doom and sludge metal band from Oakland, California. Brainoil members have been long-term contributors to the East Bay underground punk and metal music scene.

Brainoil's musical style is sludge metal influenced by bands such as Eyehategod, Melvins and Dystopia.

== History ==
=== Early days ===
The band was originally formed in 1998 by Greg Wilkinson as a solo project called Mr.Brainoil with a Boss drum machine. Greg was joined by Nate in the summer of 2000. Greg and Nate continued to work on material throughout the summer of 2000 writing and recording a demo by the fall of 2000. Greg and Nate ditched the drum machine by the winter of 2000 and were joined by Ira Harris. Brainoil's first show was on March 3, 2001, at Mission Records in San Francisco.

=== 2001–2003 ===
Brainoil entered the studio in early 2001 to record for a split CD with fellow Oakland sludge rockers Cruevo recorded by Noah Landis of Neurosis at Mr. Toad's studios in San Francisco. The CD was released by the end of 2002 as a 4-label split release between Shifty Records, Boredom Noise, Berserker and Unknown Controller. This release has since been lost to obscurity through a lack of repressing by any of the labels, and has become something of a collector's item in the sludge world. One of the songs from this recording session was released as a Split 7" with Seattle's Iron Lung on Greg Wilkinson's label, Boredom Noise (now defunct).

Brainoil played extensively in the San Francisco Bay Area and along the West coast during 2001–2003.

Brainoil entered Polymorph Studios in March 2002 to record their debut LP with engineer Dan Rathbun. The LP was released as a self-titled LP in early 2003 by Matt Parillo of Dystopia on Life is Abuse Records. The LP received many positive reviews in the weeks and months following its release, often comparing the band's initial LP to Eyehategod, and described as "the best sludge album so far this year" in a review by Jeb Branin.

=== 2004–2008 ===
At the request and assistance of Uge from Throne Records in Spain, the band's self-titled LP was re-released in Europe on Throne Records in the winter of 2003. This version of the LP featured re-mastering and a re-arrangement of the songs on each side. The re-mastering boosted the high-end frequencies and increased the overall volume. To support the LP release, Brainoil toured Western Europe in March 2004 with fellow Throne Records label-mates Moho. Upon their return from Europe, Brainoil continued to play, but with decreasing frequency in the San Francisco Bay Area from late 2004–2006. Throughout 2005–2007 Ira Harris began an extensive touring schedule with Watch Them Die. Not wanting to continue Brainoil with any other drummer, Greg and Nate shifted focus to their other musical projects until the time was right to continue with Ira.

=== 2009–2013 ===
Brainoil began playing live shows regularly again in the San Francisco Bay Area by 2009 and appeared with bands such as Ghoul, Cannabis Corpse, Eyehategod, Deviated Instinct, Buzzoven, Doom, Saviours, Lecherous Gaze, Rorschach and Dropdead. In August 2011 Brainoil released their self-produced and recorded 2nd full-length LP Death of This Dry Deason through the 20 Buck Spin label. The release was covered in the press by the East Bay Express, Decibel Magazine and reviewed online extensively. A video for the song "Gravity is a Relic" was released shortly thereafter. The band posted an internet-only release of oddities and obscurities in September 2011 Brainoil toured the east coast of the United States with Lecherous Gaze in September–October 2013.

== Members ==
- Greg Wilkinson – Bass and vocals
- Nathan Smith – Guitar and vocals
- Ira Harris – Drums

== Discography ==
=== EP ===
- Brain/Lung Split 7" with Iron Lung Boredom Noise (2001)

=== LPs ===
- Brainoil LP Life Is Abuse (2003)
- Brainoil LP Gatefold Repress Throne Records (2003)
- Death of this Dry Season LP 20 Buck Spin (2011)
- Singularity to Extinxtion LP Tankcrimes (2018)

=== CDs ===
- "Split CD with Cruevo" split label release between Berserker, Unknown Controller, Boredom Noise and Shifty (2001)

=== Downloads ===
- Brainoil oddities, obscurities and releases mix #1 (2011)

== Associated projects ==
- Ira Harris played in the punk band Grimple from Santa Fe, New Mexico during the 1990s. Ira also played and toured extensively with Watch Them Die.
- Greg Wilkinson currently plays in Autopsy (as of 2021), Deathgrave, and Shrinkwrap Killers. He has also played with the bands Laudanum and I Will Kill You Fucker.
- Nathan Smith played in the crust punk band Destroy from Minneapolis during the 1990s, and Stormcrow from 2005-2009.

== Recording projects ==
Greg and Nate recorded and produced the Born/Dead split LP with Consume in 2003. Greg Wilkinson has recorded and produced many punk, doom, sludge, and experimental bands at EarHammer Studios in Oakland, CA.
