= Burnt by the Sun (EP) =

Burnt by the Sun EP

EP by Burnt by the Sun
- Released: 2001
- Genre: Metalcore, post-hardcore, extreme metal
- Length: 8:35
- Label: Relapse

Burnt by the Sun chronology
Burnt by the Sun EP (2001)	Soundtrack to the Personal Revolution (2002)

Burnt by the Sun is the first EP by metalcore band Burnt by the Sun, released on Relapse Records.

== Track listing ==
1. "Buffy" - 2:04
2. "You Will Move" - 2:38
3. "Lizard-Skin Barbie" - 2:00
4. "The Fish Under the Sea Dance" - 1:53

== Personnel ==
- Mike Olender- vocals
- John Adubato - guitar
- Paul Miller - guitar
- Ted Patterson - bass
- Dave Witte - drums
