= Phantomsmasher =

US musical group

- Also known as: Atomsmasher
- Origin: United States
- Genres: Grindcore; cybergrind; digital hardcore; experimental; alternative rock (early); synthpop (early)
- Years active: 2000–present
- Labels: Hydra Head Records, Ipecac Recordings
- Members: James Plotkin; DJ Speedranch; Dave Witte
- Website: plotkinworks.com/phantomsmasher

Phantomsmasher is a band led by musician James Plotkin, previously known as Atomsmasher.

The band signed to Ipecac Recordings in 2002.

== Members ==
- James Plotkin – guitar, bass guitar, electronics
- DJ Speedranch – vocals
- Dave Witte – drums

== Discography ==
=== Albums ===
- Atomsmasher (as Atomsmasher, 2000), Hydra Head Records
- Phantomsmasher (2002), Ipecac Recordings

=== Splits ===
- Podsjfkj Pojid Poa / Oisdjoks 7" (with Venetian Snares, 2003), Hydra Head Records

=== Videos ===
- "Thunderspit" (from Atomsmasher)
