= Tankcrimes =

- Founded: 2002
- Founder: Scotty Heath
- Distributor: The Orchard
- Genre: Punk rock, heavy metal, grindcore, hardcore punk
- Country of origin: U.S.
- Location: Oakland, California
- Official website: www.tankcrimes.com

Tankcrimes is an independent punk rock and heavy metal record label owned by Scotty Heath and operated from his garage in Oakland, California. Tankcrimes currently has over 150 releases.

== Bands with releases on Tankcrimes ==
- A.N.S.
- Abscess
- Agoraphobic Nosebleed
- Annihilation Time
- BAT
- Bent Sea
- Brainoil
- Cannabis Corpse
- Cliterati
- Connoisseur
- Conquest for Death
- Deadfall
- Deadform
- Deathgrave
- Deny the Cross
- Direct Control
- Despise You
- Dystopia
- Exhumed
- Final Conflict
- Fucked Up
- Ghoul
- Haggus
- Impaled
- Inepsy
- Iron Reagan
- Kicker
- Los Huaycos
- Mortuous
- Municipal Waste
- Necrot
- Peligro Social
- Population Reduction
- Strung Up
- The Shrine
- Spazz
- Toxic Holocaust
- Victims
- Vitamin X
- Vivisick
- Voetsek
