= Burnt by the Sun (band) =

American rock band

- Origin: New Jersey, United States
- Genres: Metalcore; mathcore; grindcore; post-hardcore; extreme metal
- Years active: 1999–2009; 2026–present
- Labels: Relapse; Ferret
- Members: John Adubato; Ted Patterson; Dave Witte; Mike Olender; Bill Kelliher
- Website: burntbythesun.com

Burnt by the Sun is an American metalcore band formed in 1999 from New Brunswick, New Jersey. Burnt by the Sun is described as a fusion of metalcore, mathcore, and grindcore, as well as "post-hardcore extreme metal".

== History ==
Burnt by the Sun formed in November 1999 by ex-Human-Remains drummer Dave Witte and guitarist John Adubato. Ex-For the Love of... vocalist Mike Olender and bassist Ted Patterson joined soon after. A split EP with The Luddite Clone on Ferret Records brought them to the attention of metal-specialized Relapse Records. Impressed by the band's inventive, often humorous take on the metalcore genre, Relapse quickly signed the band and released their self-titled EP. Their full-length debut, Soundtrack to the Personal Revolution (featuring second guitarist Chris Rascio), was released on January 22, 2002, followed by The Perfect Is The Enemy Of The Good, which was released on October 7, 2003.

Witte and Olender opted to part ways with the group in 2004, leading to a lengthy search for suitable replacements. However, in 2006, both returned to a revamped group (now featuring Nick Hale, formerly of Premonitions of War, on 2nd guitar).

On August 25, 2009, Burnt by the Sun released Heart of Darkness. The band stated that Heart of Darkness is the band's final album.

In 2016, former members Mike Olender, John Adubato, and Dave Witte started a new band called River Black.

In 2026, the band announced their return with original members Olender, Adubato, Witte, and Patterson, along with the addition of Mastodon guitarist Bill Kelliher.

== Current lineup ==
- John Adubato – guitar (1999–2009, 2026–present)
- Ted Patterson – bass (1999–2009, 2026–present)
- Dave Witte – drums (1999–2004, 2007–2009, 2026–present)
- Mike Olender – vocals (1999–2004, 2007–2009, 2026–present)
- Bill Kelliher – guitar (2026–present)

== Discography ==
=== Studio albums ===
- Soundtrack to the Personal Revolution (2002, Relapse)
- The Perfect Is the Enemy of the Good (2003, Relapse)
- Heart of Darkness (2009, Relapse)

=== Live albums ===
- Live from the Relapse Contamination Festival (2004, Relapse)

=== Extended plays ===
- Burnt by the Sun (2001, Relapse)

=== Split releases ===
- Burnt by the Sun / Luddite Clone (2000, Ferret)
- Black on Black: A Tribute to Black Flag – Volume One (with The Hope Conspiracy) (2001, Initial)
- Burnt by The Sun / Burst (2003, Relapse)
- Burnt by the Sun / Car Bomb (2007, Relapse)
