= Municipal Waste (band) =

American metal band

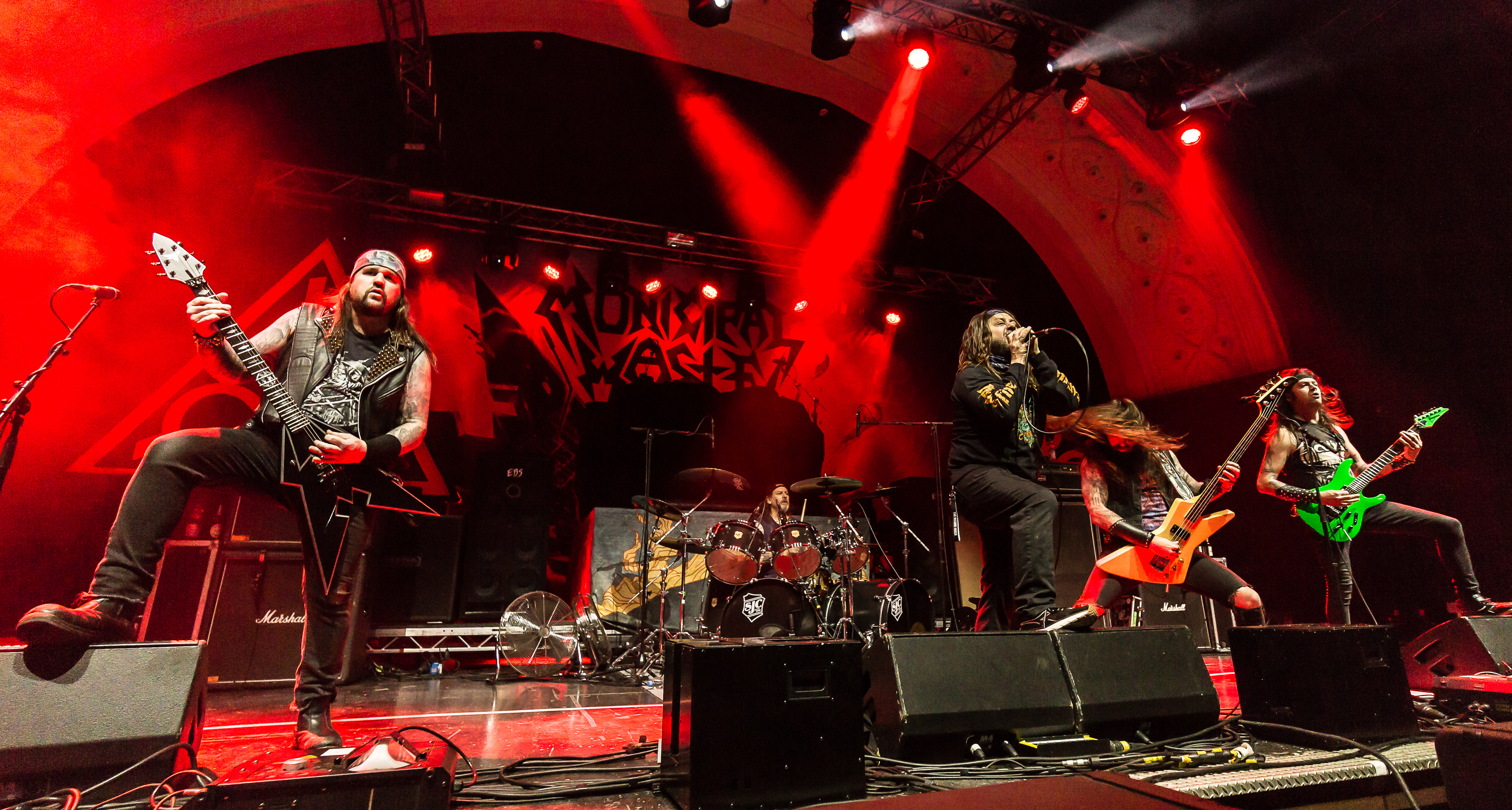
- Municipal Waste performing in 2023

Background information
- Origin: Richmond, Virginia, U.S.
- Genre: Crossover thrash
- Years active: 2000–present
- Labels: Nuclear Blast, Earache, Tankcrimes
- Members: Tony Foresta; Ryan Waste; Land Phil; Dave Witte; Nick Poulos
- Past members: Brendon Trache; Andy Harris; Brandon Ferrell
- Website: MunicipalWaste.net

Municipal Waste is an American crossover thrash band formed in Richmond, Virginia, in 2000. The band has released seven studio albums, three EPs, and four splits. Lineup changes have left vocalist Tony Foresta and rhythm guitarist Ryan Waste as the only constant members. In addition to Foresta and Waste, their current lineup includes bassist Philip "Land Phil" Hall, drummer Dave Witte, and Nick "Nikropolis" Poulos on lead guitar.

They have been called "an integral force in the second wave of the American crossover/thrash metal scene."

== History ==
=== Formation, Waste 'Em All and Hazardous Mutation (2001-2006) ===
Municipal Waste was formed in Richmond, Virginia in 2000. They played their first show at a Richmond New Year's Eve keg party in 2000–2001. The band was influenced by crossover thrash bands such as D.R.I., Suicidal Tendencies, Animosity-era Corrosion of Conformity, Nuclear Assault and Attitude Adjustment. Municipal Waste toured the US and Mexico throughout 2001 and 2002. The band released two split albums—one 7" with Bad Acid Trip, the other a 12" with Crucial Unit. They had tracks on a number of compilations.

In 2002, Brendan Trache left and was replaced with Brandon Ferrell, shortly before the Tango and Thrash on Amendment Records and Waste 'Em All was released on Six Weeks Records on January 27, 2003. Following the release of Waste 'Em All, Andy Harris and Brandon Ferrell left the band and were replaced with Cannabis Corpse bassist Philip "LandPhil" Hall and drummer Dave Witte, respectively. During this time, the band booked shows outside Virginia, including in countries such as Mexico. Waste 'Em All gained the band notoriety and led to supporting slots on tours with bands such as Converge and the Red Chord.

Municipal Waste signed with Earache Records to release their second studio album, Hazardous Mutation, on September 20, 2005. Like their debut album Hazardous Mutations met wpositive reception and helped the group gain notoriety in Europe, resulting in more touring opportunities. In July 2006, Municipal Waste headlined a US tour. The group co-headlined a US tour with GWAR from October 13, to December 12, of 2006.

=== The Art of Partying and Massive Aggressive (2007-2010) ===
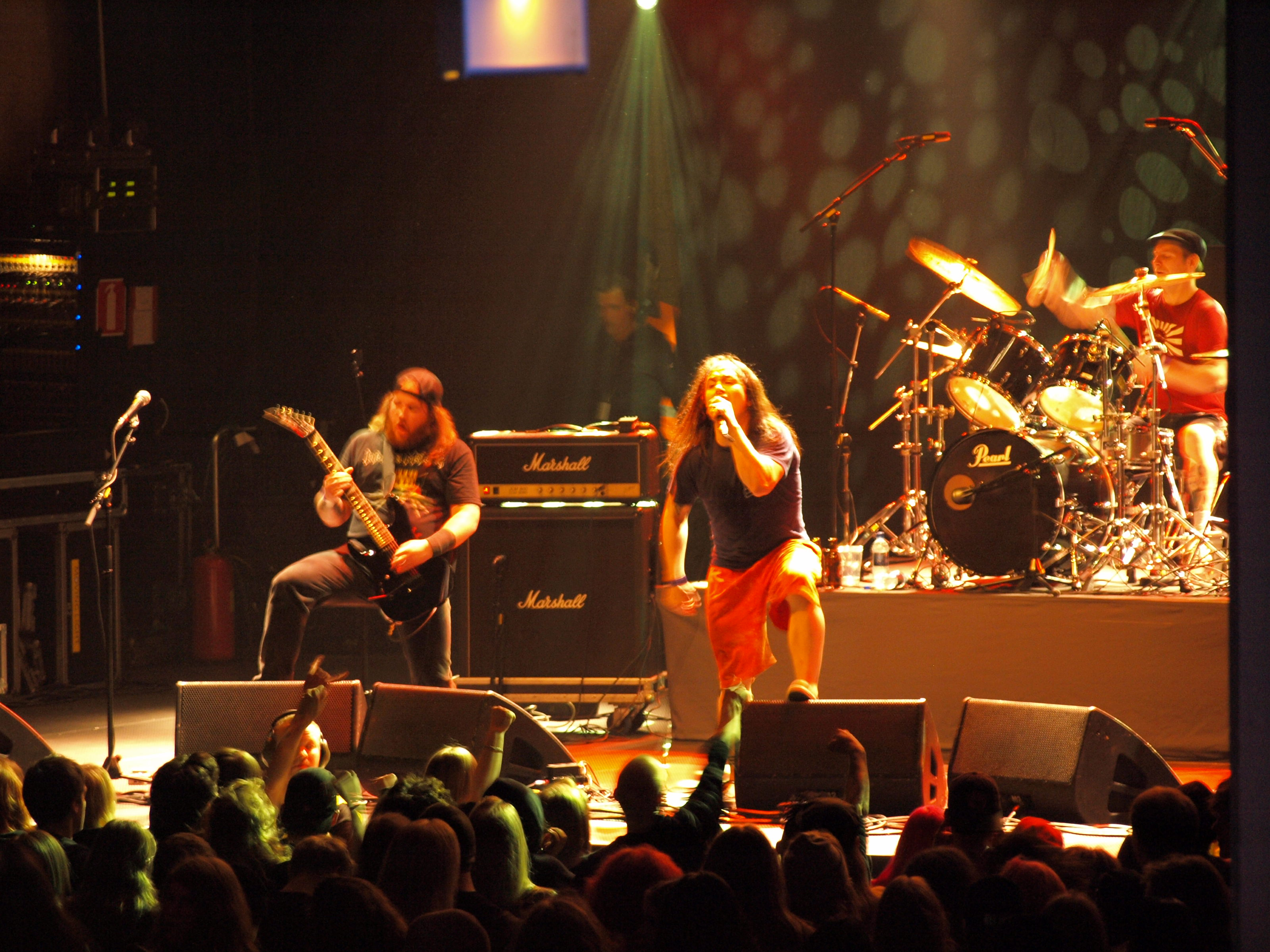
Municipal Waste live in 2008

On June 11, 2007, the band released their third studio album, The Art of Partying, produced by Zeuss. Following the album's release, Municipal Waste headlined a tour of Europe. In the Fall of that year, they headlined a US tour with supporting acts Toxic Holocaust and Skeletonwitch. At the end of the year, they played a series of tour dates with Suicidal Tendencies. Throughout 2007, the band received acclaim from the music press, with a top five album of the year placing in Sweden's Close Up magazine and top twenty positions in Big Cheese and Kerrang! They were on the front cover of Metal Maniacs magazine and made several appearances in NME.

The band toured heavily in 2008, headlining a US spring tour. They supported At The Gates on a North American tour and played a hometown show in Richmond, Virginia, alongside This Time It's War and Lamb of God.

In June and August 2009, Municipal Waste supported Lamb of God on the European leg of the Wrath Tour. On August 25 of that year, the band released their fourth album, Massive Aggressive, produced by Zeuss. It debuted at number 10 on the US Heatseekers chart and met a positive reception. The band announced the "Waste The World Tour" to support the album. The US leg of the tour took place in November and December of 2009, and featured supporting acts such as Goatwhore, The Acused and Brutal Truth on select dates. The European leg took place in late January into early February 2010 with supporting acts such as Victims and Reproach. The South American leg took place in March. The tour concluded following the Japanese leg in May. In 2010, the band was confirmed as part of the soundtrack for Namco Bandai Games' 2010 remake of Splatterhouse.

=== The Fatal Feast and Slime and Punishment (2011-2017) ===
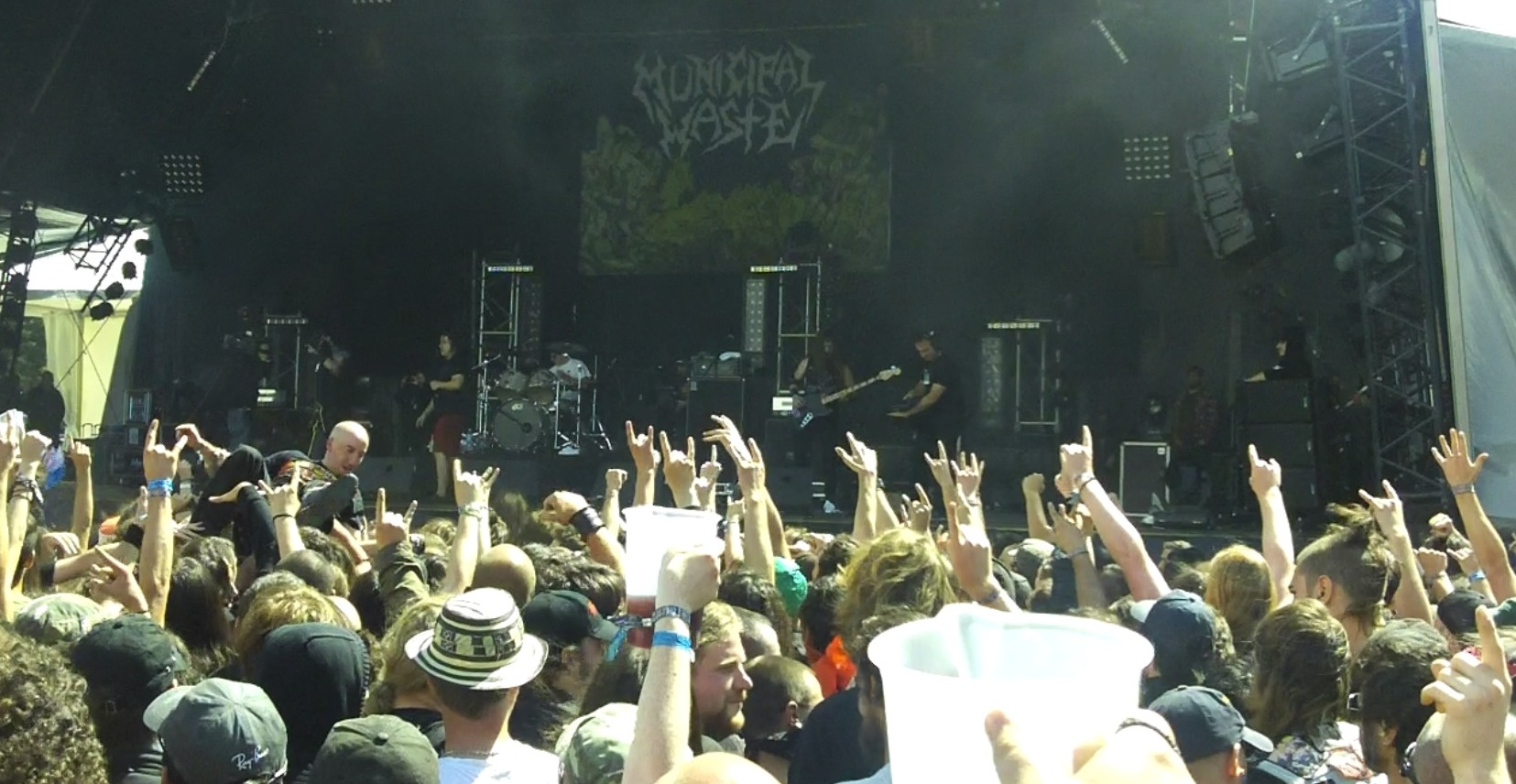
Municipal waste live in 2011

In 2011 Municipal Waste only played a handful of shows in the US, that year they only played one international show in France at HellFest 2011. On June 16, of that year it was announced that the band had signed a worldwide deal with Nuclear Blast Records.

On April 12, 2012, Municipal Waste released their fifth album The Fatal Feast which featured guest appearances by John Connelly, Steve Moore (ZOMBI), and vocalist Tim Barry (ex-Avail). The album debuted at number 1 on the US Heatseekers chart. Overall the album was met with positive reception receiving a 78/100 on Metacritic. The groups initial touring in support of the album took place in late May and June 2012 with a US headlining tour with Black Tusk. In the June of that year the group released a split Ep called Toxic Waste with Toxic Holocaust. Following this Municipal Waste embarked on a European tour which lasted till late August of that year. To finish the year they supported Napalm Death on a North American tour. Also in 2012 Tony Foresta and Land Phil started a side project called Iron Reagan.

In May 2013, Municipal Waste debuted their first signature beer "Toxic Revolution." In the Spring of 2013 Municipal Waste took part in the Metal Alliance tour alongside Anthrax and Exodus. In 2014 and 2015 the band only played a handful of shows. During this time Nick "Nikropolis" Poulos who was a friend of Foresta joined the band as their new lead guitarist, with Ryan Waste transitioning to rhythm guitar. In 2016 they returned to actively touring along with playing the festival circuit including a Summer European tour.

On May 31, 2016, the band's former drummer Brandon Ferrell died at the age of 32 no cause of death was revealed.

In January 2017, Municipal Waste took part in the Persistence Tour alongside Suicidal Tendencies and Agnostic Front. On April 28, 2017, the grouped announced their sixth album Slim and Punishment would be released on June 23, of that year. The group opted to self produce the record with bassist Land Phil serving as the album's engineer. The album debuted at number 3 on the US Heatseekers chart, while also reaching the top 10 of the Independent Albums and Top Hard Rock Albums charts. Overall it was met with positive reviews. From June 6 to August 16, Municipal Waste took part in that year's Warped Tour.

=== Electrified Brain (2018-present) ===
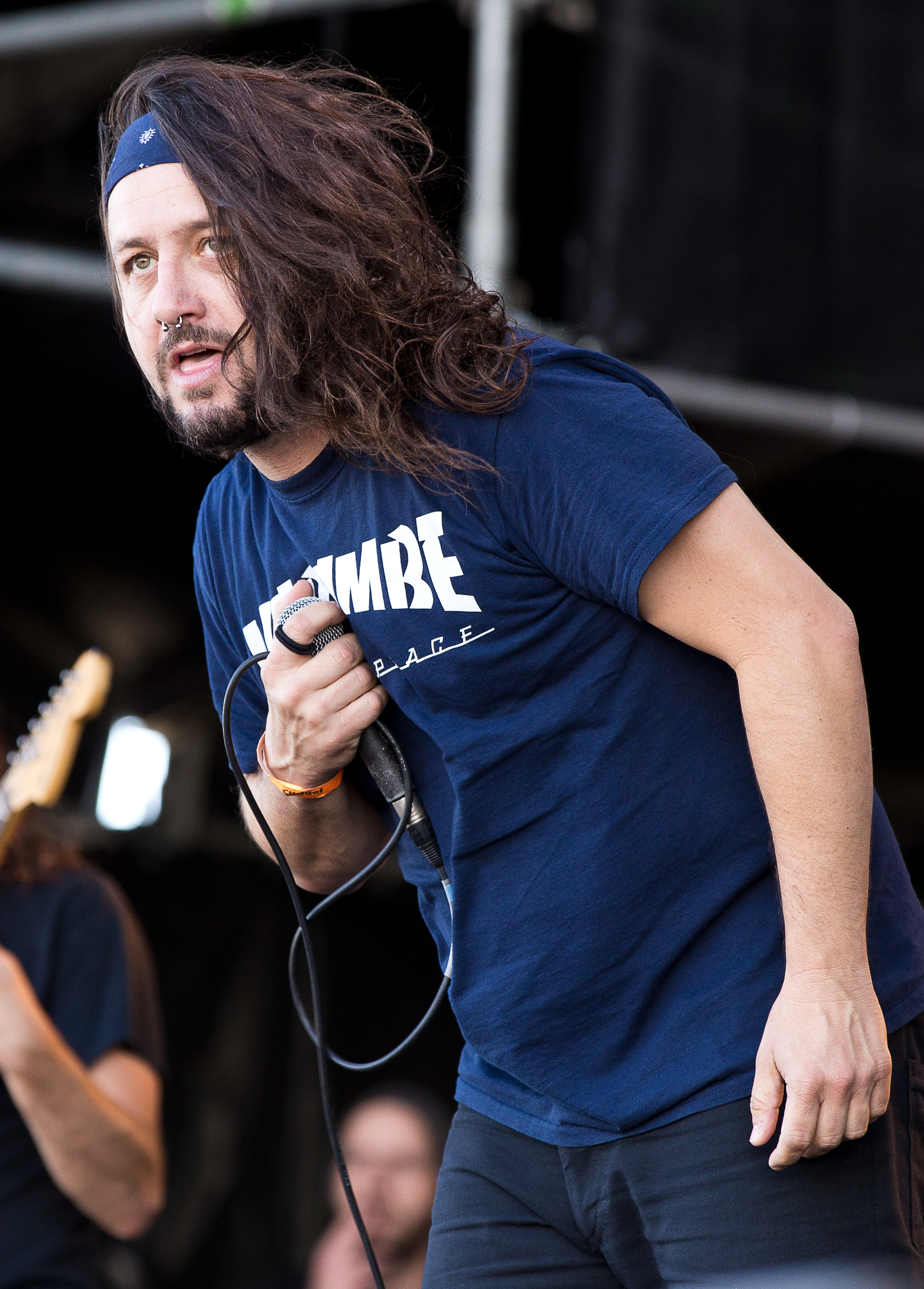
Lead singer Tony Foresta

In the Summer of 2018 Municipal Waste played multiple headlining shows, in August Foresta announced that the band was working on a new Ep. To close of the year they co headlined the "The Speed of Wizard tour" with High on Fire in November. On October 11, 2019, Municipal Waste released a four-song EP called The Last Rager. Following this they went on a US tour alongside Napalm Death and Sick of It All. They ended the year with a European winter headlining tour with Toxic Holocaust, Enforcer and Skeletal Remains.

After not touring at all in 2020, Municipal Waste returned to playing live shows in late 2021 alongside Volbeat and the Circle Jerks. On October 29, of that year it was announced the group has re signed with Nuclear Blast Records and would be releasing their seventh studio album sometime in 2022. They then held their own US headlining tour alongside Crowbar and Skeletal Remains in November.

In early 2022 Municipal Waste took part in the Decibel tour alongside acts such as Obituary and Gatecreeper. On April 1, the group released the single "Grave Dive" and announced their seventh studio album Electrified Brain. The album which was once again self produced was later released on July 1, and was met with positive reception. In support of the album they toured the US in August alongside At The Gates, Europe in the Fall with Anthrax and went on a co headlining tour with High on Fire in December.

In April 2023 Municipal Waste supported Carcass on a North American tour. In early 2024 The band held the "Brainsqueeze" North American tour in celebration of Waste 'Em All's 21st anniversary. Ghoul, Necrot, and Dead Heat served as supporting acts. On May 24, they released a nine-song Ep called Tango & Thrash, which is reissue of their material from a split with Bad Acid Trip along with extra tracks.

In January and February 2025, they supported Slayer guitarist Kerry King on his North American tour. During the Summer of 2026, they will headline a dubbed the "Summer of Shove Europe tour." They will also support Testament on their Latin American tour which takes place in late 2026.

== Musical style and influences ==
Municipal Waste's songwriting approach takes form in short, crossover thrash songs. According to AllMusic, the band "openly bow down to the memory of '80s thrash metal and crossover decades after, and a few hundred miles away from, the original movement's heyday in New York City." Despite often being associated with the metal genre, members of Municipal Waste have stated that they do not strictly classify themselves as a metal band. With their songs often using heavy riffs, melodic elements, and a blend of various styles, including punk and grunge. lead singer Tony Foresta has described the band's sound as "dirty [and] metal/punk-sounding."

Lyrical topics have to do with alcoholism, mutants, or thrash metal. The music is also described as being, and the band has received the tag "party thrash" from the media. The band's song titles are also comedic, or give nods to their influences such as "Thrashing's My Business... And Business Is Good", "The Thrashin' of the Christ", "Thrash?! Don't Mind If I Do" and "Drunk as Shit".

When asked about the band lyrical themes in 2022 Foresta stated:

Some of the stuff has storylines that we wrote from the Waste 'Em All era, Substitute Creature and all that stuff. That's a song that's based off a story from the first seven inch. We have running themes like that. If people actually pay attention to our lyrics, they can catch on pretty fast. Most of our stuff is our own world that we've created, that builds upon itself. We also write about Kurt Russell movies and social issues. We kind of just keep it all across the board or whatever' more interesting for us. We definitely have created our own world lyrically where we can branch out and do a lot of fun stuff and still make sure it's a Municipal Waste song.

The band members themselves have stated that they are influenced by such groups as Suicidal Tendencies, D.R.I., Slayer, Anthrax, Exodus, Testament, Sepultura, Nuclear Assault, Vio-lence, Forbidden, S.O.D., M.O.D. and the Cro-Mags.

== Controversies ==
In August 2009, while playing a show in Norway Municipal Waste brought a church sculpture made out of cardboard on stage and burned it. When asked why they did it lead singer Tony Foresta stated "We had to prove ourselves as the most evil band in the world - more evil than the Norwegian black metal bands - so we burned one down." While people in the audience reacted positively to the act, it later gained backlash from the local media in Norway.

In January 2016 Municipal Waste found itself in controversy once again when they made a shirt depicting U.S. President Donald Trump shooting himself in the head. The shirt was initially designed as a one-off for a show they were playing in Los Angeles, however it ended up gaining significant traction. In 2022 Foresta admitted the band did not regret making the shirt.

== Band members ==
Current members

- Tony Foresta – lead vocals (2001–present)
- Ryan Waste – rhythm guitar, backing vocals (2001–present), lead guitar (2001–2015)
- Philip "Land Phil" Hall – bass, backing vocals (2004–present)
- Dave Witte – drums (2004–present)
- Nick "Nikropolis" Poulos – lead guitar (2015–present)

Former members

- Andy Harris – bass (2001–2004)
- Brendan Trache – drums (2001–2002)
- Brandon Ferrell – drums (2002–2004; died 2016)

Timeline

== Discography ==
Studio albums

- Waste 'Em All (2003, Six Weeks Records)
- Hazardous Mutation (2005, Earache Records)
- The Art of Partying (2007, Earache Records)
- Massive Aggressive (2009, Earache Records)
- The Fatal Feast (2012, Nuclear Blast Records)
- Slime and Punishment (2017, Nuclear Blast Records)
- Electrified Brain (2022, Nuclear Blast Records)

EPs

- Municipal Waste (2001, Amendment Records / Busted Heads Records)
- Scion Presents: Municipal Waste (2012, Scion Audio Visual)
- Garbage Pack (2012, Night of the Vinyl Dead Records)
- The Last Rager (2019, Nuclear Blast Records)

Splits

- Municipal Waste / Crucial Unit (2002, Six Weeks Records)
- Tango and Thrash (with Bad Acid Trip) (2004, Mordar Records)
- Louder Than Hell (2005, Six Weeks Records)
- Toxic Waste (with Toxic Holocaust) (2012, Tankcrimes Records)

Compilations

- Waste 'Em All / Tango and Thrash (2004, Rabid Dog Records)
- "Tango & Thrash" (2024, Nuclear Blast Records)

Music videos

- "Thrashin's My Business... and Business Is Good"
- "Headbanger Face Rip"
- "Sadistic Magician"
- "Wrong Answer"
- "Acid Sentence"
- "Wolves of Chernobyl"
- "The Fatal Feast"
- "Repossession"
- "You're Cut Off"
- "Breathe Grease"
- "Slime And Punishment"
- "Wave of Death"
- "Electrified Brain"
- "Grave Dive"
- "Crank The Heat"
- "High Speed Steel"

Contributed tracks to

Title	Date of release	Label
Super Sabado Fest Comp 12"	2003	Six Weeks Records
Dark Thoughts - A Tribute to C.O.C.	2003	Rabid Dog
Teenagers from Uranus (DVD)	2005	Day By Day
Thrashing Like a Maniac	2008	Earache
Teenage Time Killers 2015

== Awards and accolades ==
Loudwire Music Awards

Year	Nominee / work	Award	Result
2017	Amateur Sketch	Metal Song of the Year	Nominated

Metal Hammer Golden Gods Awards

Year	Nominee / work	Award	Result
2007	Municipal Waste	Best Underground Band	Nominated
2008	Municipal Waste	Best Underground Band	Nominated

Decibel Hall of Fame

Year	Nominee / work	Award	Result
2020	The Art of Partying	Decibel Hall of Fame	Inducted
