= Sounds of the Animal Kingdom =

1997 album by grindcore band Brutal Truth

Studio album by Brutal Truth
- Released: September 23, 1997
- Recorded: June 1997
- Studios: Smoke, Grind, Sleep (Note: Opening sequence of "Blue World"); Baby Monster (New York City)
- Genres: Grindcore; death metal; experimental metal
- Length: 74:08
- Label: Relapse
- Producer: Billy Anderson

Brutal Truth chronology
Kill Trend Suicide (1996)	Sounds of the Animal Kingdom (1997)	Evolution Through Revolution (2009)

Sounds of the Animal Kingdom is the fourth studio album by American grindcore band Brutal Truth, released on September 23, 1997 by Relapse Records. It was the band's first release on Relapse Records, and last with guitarist Brent McCarthy. Recorded with Billy Anderson, it showcased a more experimental and varied style than the band's previous albums, incorporating elements of blues, psychedelic rock, noise, southern rock and free jazz. In 2006, the album was remastered and reissued with its preceding mini album Kill Trend Suicide (1996).

== Background and recording ==
Brutal Truth wrote material for Sounds of the Animal Kingdom over the course of two years between its departure from Earache Records and its signing with Relapse Records, working at their rehearsal space three times a week. According to Hoak, the band would write and jam material at their rehearsal before handing "rough tracks" to vocalist Kevin Sharp, whom would fit or make up lyrics for the music. "Machine Parts" was originally recorded for a 7-inch demo released prior to Kill Trend Suicide; other songs on Sounds of the Animal Kingdom were written two months before it was recorded.

Brutal Truth recorded Sounds of the Animal Kingdom with producer Billy Anderson in June 1997. It was recorded at Baby Monster Studios and mixed at The Magic Shop, both in New York City; the opening sequence to "Blue World" was recorded at the band's Smoke, Grind, Sleep studio. Hoak said the album took "eight to ten days to record, [and] another six or eight to mix". The band spent a day each on its drum and guitar sound, and half a day on its bass; the tom drum sound was changed for certain songs. Bassist Dan Lilker attributed the album's "muffled" production to the band's marijuana use during recording. Bill Yurkiewicz of Exit-13 contributed backing vocals to "Postulate Then Liberate".

== Composition ==
According to Adrian Bromley of Chronicles of Chaos, Sounds of the Animal Kingdom is "intense and brutal [...] meld[ing] grindcore, death metal and hardcore attributes into one pounding rhythm". The album features a more experimental and varied style than previous albums, incorporating elements of blues, psychedelic rock, noise, southern rock and free jazz. "Dementia" opens with a sample from the 1953 film The 5,000 Fingers of Dr. T., whilst "Blue World" is composed of samples from records drummer Rich Hoak found at flea markets, including an "environmental sounds record" with the ocean, Molly Hatchet, Telly Savalas and the Oliver! soundtrack. The album's closing track, "Prey", features a looping 2-second snippet from "Average People" that goes on for almost 22 minutes on the original CD. On the vinyl release of the album, the song is contained within a locked groove, making it play indefinitely. The song was cut down to 40 seconds on its 2006 reissue with the mini-album Kill Trend Suicide (1996). The album includes a cover of Sun Ra's "It's After the End of the World". The Japanese release features three more cover songs as bonus tracks; "Hippie Cult" by Agathocles, "Cybergod" by Nausea and "Cornucopia" by Black Sabbath.

Hoak said that the majority of the lyrics on Sounds of the Animal Kingdom revolve around "the animal within man being confronted with problems caused in society which are based on technology", and considered them to be "more politically conscious than outright political" compared to Brutal Truth's previous two albums. "Postulate Then Liberate" and "Promise" both discuss the "hypocrisy of hemp laws". The liner notes features a quote from The Naked Ape (1967) by English zoologist and ethologist Desmond Morris, which Hoak found in a library whilst brainstorming ideas for its cover. Some journalists described the lyrics as based on The Naked Ape and/or Morris' ideas, which Hoak denied, stating that the title had already been decided before he and Sharp realised the similarites between the album's themes and the book and discussed its concept. The album's cover artwork features a photoshopped image that merges a stock photo of a gorilla with the UPS driver to Relapse Records, whom the art director paid with a case of beer.

== Release and promotion ==
Sounds of the Animal Kingdom was released by Relapse on September 23, 1997. Brutal Truth embarked on a worldwide tour in support of the album, starting with a 90-date tour of the United States before a tour with Cannibal Corpse, Immolation and Oppressor. In December 1997, they toured the United States and Canada, performing four shows with Today is the Day and Turmoil. The band toured Japan, Europe and Australia in 1998, before disbanding in September of that year. In 2000, a compilation of 10 live tracks recorded for a radio promotion in New Zealand in August 1998 was released as the live album For Drug Crazed Grindfreaks Only!. Four Brutal Truth shows recorded during the Sounds of the Animal Kingdom tour were later released on the band's first and only DVD release, For the Ugly and Unwanted: This Is Grindcore (2009). Brutal Truth reunited in May 2006; in October of that year, Relapse reissused the album and Kill Trend Suicide together in a remastered package by Scott Hull of Pig Destroyer. The reissue included expanded liner notes and the music video for "Dead Smart". A remastered version of the album by Brad Boatright was released in September 2026.

== Critical reception ==
Professional ratings
Review scores
Source	Rating
AllMusic	4/5 stars
Chronicles of Chaos	7/10
Encyclopedia of Popular Music	3/5 stars
The Great Metal Discography	6/10
Hit Parader	4/5 stars
Kerrang!	3/5 stars
Rock Hard	4/10

Mike DaRonco of AllMusic praised Sounds of the Animal Kingdom for being "more structured and compounded than Cannibal Corpse will ever be", and felt its apocalyptic-yet-realistic subject matter was atypical of death metal. Hit Parader said that Brutal Truth's creativity and impact was not limited by the album's "straight-forward attack". Bromley found the album "very creative at times" and deemed it superior to Kill Trend Suicide, but also considered it "lacking [in] some of the momentum and craziness" of Need to Control (1994). Mörat of Kerrang! considered Brutal Truth to be "sharp as ever" lyrically but compared the album's direction unfavourably with Neurosis and Logical Nonsense, with the former "[doing] the slow bits better" and the latter's debut album Expand the Hive (1997) "[making] the fast bits [seem] pretty redundant." Jan Jaedike of Rock Hard felt that Brutal Truth "struggle[d] to draw the line between a somewhat tolerable grind-fest and pointlessly fragmented, nonsensical noise" on the album, though he praised the songs "Callous", "Fisting", and "Dead Smart".

In their reviews of the 2006 reissue with Kill Trend Suicide, André Bohnensack of Ox-Fanzine described Sounds of the Animal Kingdom as representing Brutal Truth's peak and a perfection of the band's "combination of rough grindcore and all kinds of sound experiments", whilst Metal Injection called it a culmination of "the epic scope of [Extreme Conditions Demand Extreme Responses], the experimentation of [Need to Control], and the raw fury of [Kill Trend Suicide]". In a 2009 interview, Decibel founder and editor Albert Mudrian praised the album as "one of the most complete [...] in grindcore history", despite "[sounding] like it was recorded under a stack of wet mattresses". In 2011, Robin Jadhi of Fact wrote that the album "redefined the [grindcore] genre [...] covering Sun Ra and generally bringing [grindcore's] technical chaos to a whole new level."

In 2000, readers of Terrorizer voted Sounds of the Animal Kingdom as the 66th greatest album of the 1990s; its cover artwork was also voted the second greatest of the decade behind that of Emperor's debut album, In the Nightside Eclipse (1994). Mudrian included the album in the "Essential Discography" for 1997 in his book Choosing Death: The Improbable History of Death Metal & Grindcore (2004). Andrew Bonzanelli, also of Decibel, ranked the album at number 27 on the magazine's list of the "Top 30 Grindcore Albums of All Time". In 2013, The Village Voice ranked the album at number 11 on its list of the "Top 20 New York Hardcore and Metal Albums of All Time". In 2015, Greg Pratt of Brave Words & Bloody Knuckles called the album both the best Relapse Records album of all time, and the "best grindcore album ever: sprawling and expansive, ugly and raw, progressive and regressive". In 2016, Metal Hammer listed it as one of its "10 essential grindcore albums", selecting it over Brutal Truth's other albums "due to the sheer diversity and deranged experimentalism of its contents". Justin M. Norton of About.com also ranked the album at number 4 on the site's list of ten "Essential Grindcore Albums".

Reflecting on the album's reception in 2015, Lilker stated:

[W]hen that record came out, a lot of people just did not know what to make of it and it took a couple years to sink in. [...] a couple years later, all of a sudden, everybody got that record, and [Brutal Truth] was done. People were coming up to me and saying, 'Man, dude, that record is so nuts. Do you realize what an impact that record made?' I'm like, 'That's funny, because when that record was out, we were playing in front of 40 people.' [...] People still tell me to this day what a crazy record that is and how it changed their lives, so I’m proud of it, man.

== Track listing ==
All songs by Brutal Truth, except "It's After the End of the World" written by Sun Ra.

Standard release
No.	Title	Length
1.	"Dementia"	2:04
2.	"K.A.P."	1:23
3.	"Vision"	0:49
4.	"Fucktoy"	1:23
5.	"Jemenez Cricket"	3:40
6.	"Soft Mind"	1:04
7.	"Average People"	2:18
8.	"Blue World"	7:14
9.	"Callous"	0:11
10.	"Fisting"	1:19
11.	"Die Laughing"	3:08
12.	"Dead Smart"	3:05
13.	"Sympathy Kiss"	4:54
14.	"Pork Farm"	1:51
15.	"Promise"	2:19
16.	"Foolish Bastard"	1:09
17.	"Postulate Then Liberate"	1:40
18.	"It's After the End of the World" (Sun Ra cover)	2:09
19.	"Machine Parts"	4:22
20.	"4:20"	3:00
21.	"Unbaptized"	3:22
22.	"Prey"	21:50
Total length:		74:08

Notes

- On vinyl copies of the album, Sounds of the Animal Kingdom ends with a locked groove on side four on "Prey".
- On the 2006 reissue, "Prey" is shortened to 40 seconds and "4:20" is omitted.

== Personnel ==
Adapted from liner notes.

Brutal Truth

- Kevin Sharp – vocals
- Dan Lilker – bass, backing vocals
- Brent McCarthy – guitars
- Rich Hoak – drums

Additional personnel

- Bill Yurkiewicz - backing vocals (17)

Production

- Billy Anderson – production, engineering, mixing
- Brutal Truth – engineering, mixing
- Juan Garcia – engineering, mixing
- Jon Smith – assistant engineer
- Brad Boatright – 2026 remaster
