= Game Over (Nuclear Assault album) =

Studio album by Nuclear Assault
- Released: October 7, 1986
- Recorded: May 1986
- Studio: Pyramid (Ithaca, New York)
- Genres: Thrash metal; crossover thrash
- Length: 36:01
- Label: Combat
- Producers: Alex Perialas, Nuclear Assault, Steve Sinclair

Nuclear Assault chronology
Brain Death (EP) (1986)	Game Over (1986)	The Plague (EP) (1987)

Singles from Game Over
- 1. "Brain Death" Released: 1986

Game Over is the debut album by American thrash metal band Nuclear Assault, released in 1986.

The cassette version of Game Over featured a track entitled "Lesbians", which did not appear on the CD version. However, this track was later performed on their 1992 live album Live at the Hammersmith Odeon.

== Critical reception ==
Professional ratings
Review scores
Source	Rating
AllMusic	2.5/5 stars
Collector's Guide to Heavy Metal	5/10
Kerrang!	3.5/5 stars

In 2005, Game Over was ranked number 287 in Rock Hard magazine's book The 500 Greatest Rock & Metal Albums of All Time.

== Track listing ==
All tracks are written by Nuclear Assault.

Side one
No.	Title	Length
1.	"Live, Suffer, Die" (instrumental)	1:08
2.	"Sin"	3:25
3.	"Cold Steel"	2:41
4.	"Betrayal"	3:01
5.	"Radiation Sickness"	2:49
6.	"Hang the Pope"	0:46
7.	"After the Holocaust"	3:44
8.	"Mr. Softee Theme" (instrumental)	0:25

Side two
No.	Title	Length
9.	"Stranded in Hell"	3:39
10.	"Nuclear War"	3:47
11.	"My America"	0:29
12.	"Vengeance"	2:51
13.	"Brain Death"	7:16

== Personnel ==
Nuclear Assault

- John Connelly – lead vocals, guitars
- Anthony Bramante – guitars
- Danny Lilker – bass
- Glenn Evans – drums

Additional musicians

- Chad McGloughlin – guest performance on "Brain Death"

Production

- Alex Perialas – producer with Nuclear Assault, engineer
- Tom Coyne – mastering at Frankford/Wayne, New York
- Ed Repka – album design and cover art
- Steve Sinclair - executive producer
