= Out of Order (Nuclear Assault album) =

Studio album by Nuclear Assault
- Released: September 10, 1991
- Recorded: March 26–April 20, 1991
- Studios: The Hit Factory, New York, New York and Presence Studios, East Haven, Connecticut
- Genre: Thrash metal
- Length: 46:04
- Label: I.R.S.
- Producers: Glenn Evans, Casey McMackin

Nuclear Assault chronology
Handle with Care (1989)	Out of Order (1991)	Live at the Hammersmith Odeon (1992)

Professional ratings
Review scores
Source	Rating
AllMusic	1.5/5 stars
Metal Hammer	4/5 stars

Out of Order is the fourth studio album released by american thrash metal band Nuclear Assault in 1991. This was the last Nuclear Assault studio album (until Third World Genocide) to feature Danny Lilker.

"Ballroom Blitz" is a Sweet cover.

== Track listing ==
All songs arranged by Glenn Evans and Nuclear Assault, except where noted

No.	Title	Lyrics	Music	Length
1.	"Sign in Blood"	John Connelly, Dan Lilker	Anthony Bramante, Lilker	3:47
2.	"Fashion Junkie"	Connelly, Evans, Lilker	Bramante, Lilker	3:44
3.	"Too Young to Die"	Connelly, Evans	Bramante, Connelly, Evans, Lilker	3:51
4.	"Preaching to the Deaf"	Connelly	Connelly, Lilker	4:49
5.	"Resurrection"	Connelly, Lilker	Bramante, Lilker	5:12
6.	"Stop Wait Think"	Connelly	Lilker, Evans	5:02
7.	"Doctor Butcher" (arranged by Bramante and Lilker)	Bramante	Bramante, Lilker	3:42
8.	"Quocustodiat" (arranged by Connelly)	Connelly	Connelly	2:35
9.	"Hypocrisy"	Lilker	Lilker, Evans	2:49
10.	"Save the Planet" (instrumental)		Bramante	6:36
11.	"Ballroom Blitz" (The Sweet cover)	Nicky Chinn, Mike Chapman	Chinn, Chapman	3:57

== Personnel ==
Nuclear Assault

- John Connelly – vocals, lead and rhythm guitars on "Preaching to the Deaf" and "Quocustodiat"
- Anthony Bramante – lead guitars, vocals
- Dan Lilker – bass, keyboards, guitar, vocals
- Glenn Evans – drums, percussion, acoustic guitars, vocals, producer

Additional musicians

- Casey McMackin – guitars, backing vocals
- John Quinn – keyboards
- Maggie Gray – whispers on track 11
- Jim Welch – backing vocals

Production

- Casey McMackin – producer, engineer
- Jay Ryan, John Quinn – assistant engineers
- Eddy Schreyer – mastering
