= Handle with Care (Nuclear Assault album) =

Studio album by Nuclear Assault
- Released: October 3, 1989
- Recorded: 1989
- Studios: The Music Grinder, Los Angeles, California
- Genres: Thrash metal; crossover thrash
- Length: 35:05
- Label: In-Effect
- Producer: Randy Burns

Nuclear Assault chronology
Survive (1988)	Handle with Care (1989)	Out of Order (1991)

Handle with Care is the third studio album by American thrash metal band Nuclear Assault, released on October 3, 1989. This is the band's most successful and best-selling album to date, peaking at number 126 on the Billboard 200, making it their highest position so far. "Critical Mass" was released as a single to promote the album.

== Reception ==
Professional ratings
Review scores
Source	Rating
AllMusic	4.5/5 stars
Collector's Guide to Heavy Metal	7/10

Reviews for Handle with Care have been mostly positive. AllMusic's Eduardo Rivadavia awards the album four-and-a-half stars out of five and describes it as "a record which stands the test of time as one of the East Coast's best offerings to the thrash metal genre." Rivadavia also praises Handle with Care a "perfect introduction, and pretty much all one will ever need from Nuclear Assault", while he describes "Critical Mass," "F♮ (Wake Up)," and "When Freedom Dies" as "outstanding thrashers."

Handle with Care entered the Billboard 200 album charts in February 1990, about four months after its release. The album peaked at number 126 and remained on the chart for 24 weeks.

Handle with Care was ranked at number seven on Loudwire's top ten list of "Thrash Albums NOT Released by the Big 4".

== Anecdotes ==
The sentence "The svastika is calling you", which is heard at the very end of the song "Torture Tactics", is taken from the movie The Blues Brothers. This sentence is yelled on the megaphone by the head of the Illinois Nazi Party (played by Henry Gibson) during the scene of the bridge. "Torture Tactics" being a very caricatured political song towards Nazis, this sentence is suited, since The Blues Brothers is a caricatured movie too.

== Track listing ==
No.	Title	Lyrics	Music	Length
1.	"New Song"	John Connelly	Connelly	2:58
2.	"Critical Mass"	Connelly	Dan Lilker	3:19
3.	"Inherited Hell"	Connelly	Connelly	3:30
4.	"Surgery"	Connelly	Lilker, Glenn Evans	2:44
5.	"Emergency"	Connelly	Evans	3:20
6.	"Funky Noise" (instrumental)	Connelly	Connelly	0:50
7.	"F♮ (Wake Up)"	Connelly	Connelly	2:58
8.	"When Freedom Dies"	Connelly	Lilker	2:34
9.	"Search & Seizure"	Evans	Evans	4:11
10.	"Torture Tactics"	Connelly	Connelly	2:22
11.	"Mothers' Day"	Lilker, Evans	Lilker, Evans	0:32
12.	"Trail of Tears"	Connelly	Connelly	5:44

2008 Deluxe Edition bonus tracks
No.	Title	Length
13.	"Intro/New Song"	3:11
14.	"Critical Mass"	3:11
15.	"Torture Tactics"	2:07
16.	"Trail of Tears"	3:57
17.	"Mother's Day"	0:59
18.	"Funky Noise"	0:50

Tracks 13–18 taken from the Live at the Hammersmith Odeon album

== Personnel ==
Nuclear Assault

- John Connelly – lead vocals, guitars
- Anthony Bramante – guitars
- Dan Lilker – bass
- Glenn Evans – drums

Additional musicians

- Barry Stern, Mo Alonso, Ron Holzner – backing vocals

Production

- Randy Burns – producer
- Casey McMakin – engineer
- Larry Malchose, Steve Heinke – assistant engineers
