= Venomous Concept =

American hardcore punk band

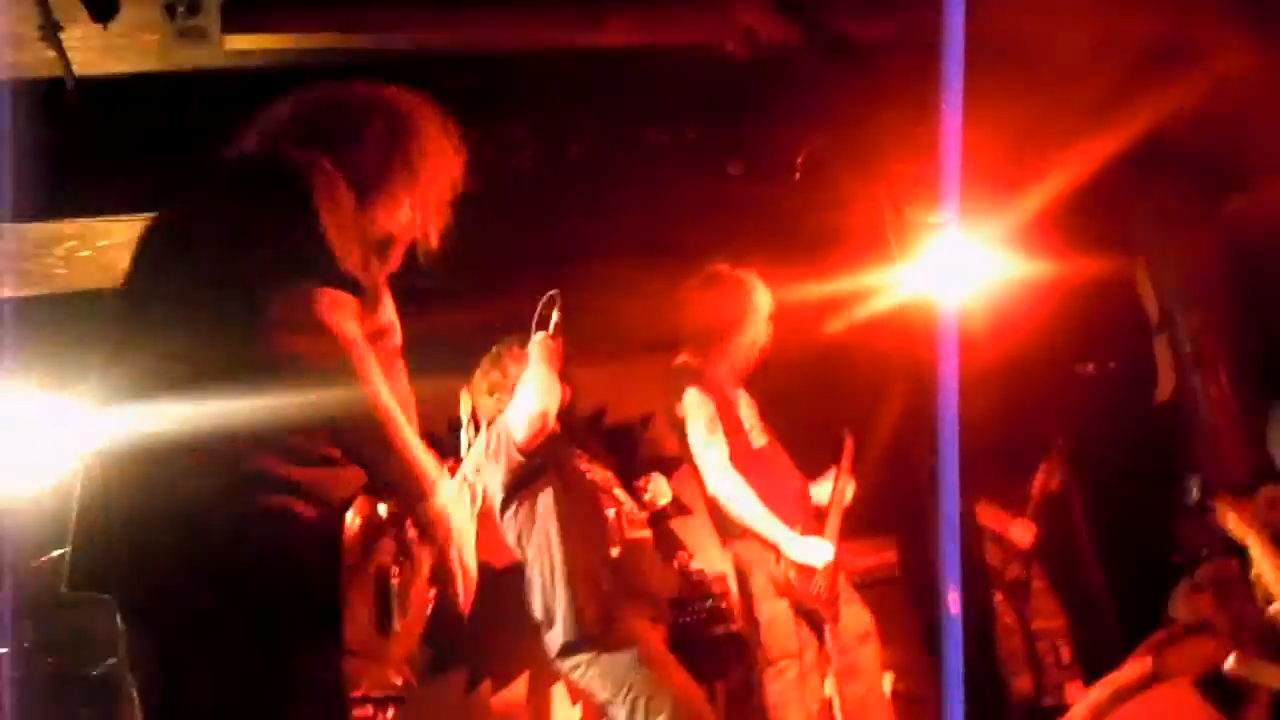
- Venomous Concept performing in 2016

Background information
- Genres: Hardcore punk; grindcore; extreme metal
- Years active: 2004–present
- Labels: Ipecac, Hypertension
- Members: Shane Embury; Danny Herrera; Danny Lilker; Kevin Sharp; John Cooke
- Past members: Buzz Osborne

Venomous Concept is an American hardcore punk band formed by Kevin Sharp of Brutal Truth and Shane Embury of Napalm Death in 2004. Sharp and Embury were joined by Danny Herrera and Buzz Osborne, who was later replaced by Danny Lilker. They have released five studio albums to date: Retroactive Abortion (2004), Poisoned Apple (2008), Kick Me Silly VCIII (2016), "Politics Versus the Erection" (2020) and "The Good Ship Lollipop" (2023). They have also released two split albums: one with Japanese grindcore band 324 (2006), and the other with Australian extreme metal band Blood Duster (2008). The band's name is a play on Poison Idea, in the style of name-mangling Japanese hardcore acts.

== History ==
In February 2004, Kevin Sharp was the tour driver for Napalm Death on The Art of Noise tour with Nile, Strapping Young Lad, Dark Tranquillity and The Berzerker. Shane Embury and Sharp were already acquainted, and "some beers, pizza and old vinyl classics by Poison Idea, Black Flag and Systematic Death" renewed their friendship. They decided to start a band together. Embury remembered:

Napalm were on tour with Nile and when the driver had to leave, Kevin Sharp who sang for Brutal Truth, stood in for him. I ended up going back to Chicago with him and we said, "Hey, how come we've never been in a band together? We both loved mid-80's punk, we both loved Poison Idea and Black Flag", so that was the starting point.

They recruited Buzz Osborne of the Melvins on guitar and Napalm Death's Danny Herrera on drums, and released their debut Retroactive Abortion (2004) via Mike Patton's Ipecac Recordings. The band replaced Osborne with bassist Danny Lilker for their second album, Poisoned Apple (2008), while Embury moved to guitar. In 2006, Belgian record label Hypertension Records re-issued Retroactive Abortion on vinyl.

== Members ==
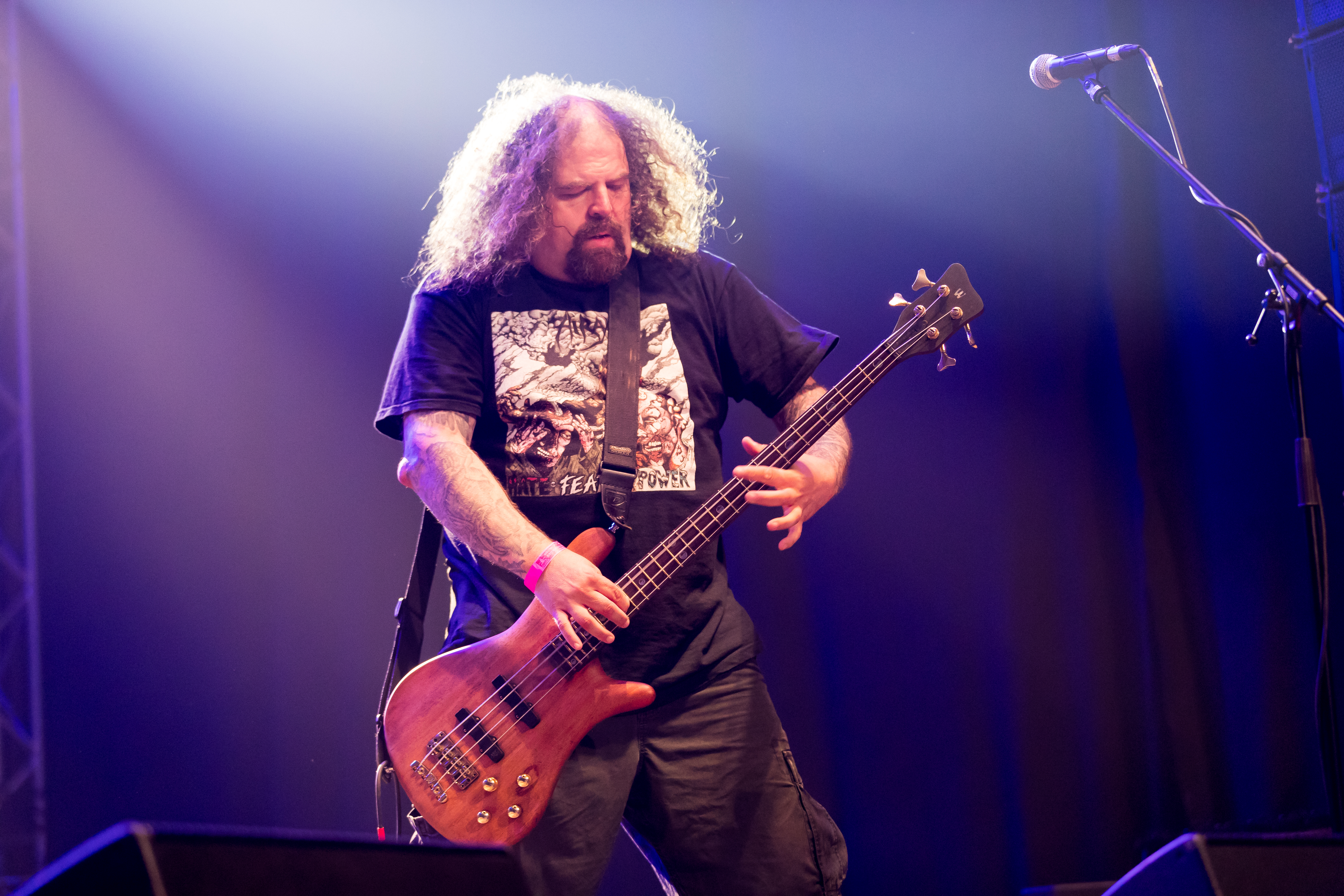
Shane Embury

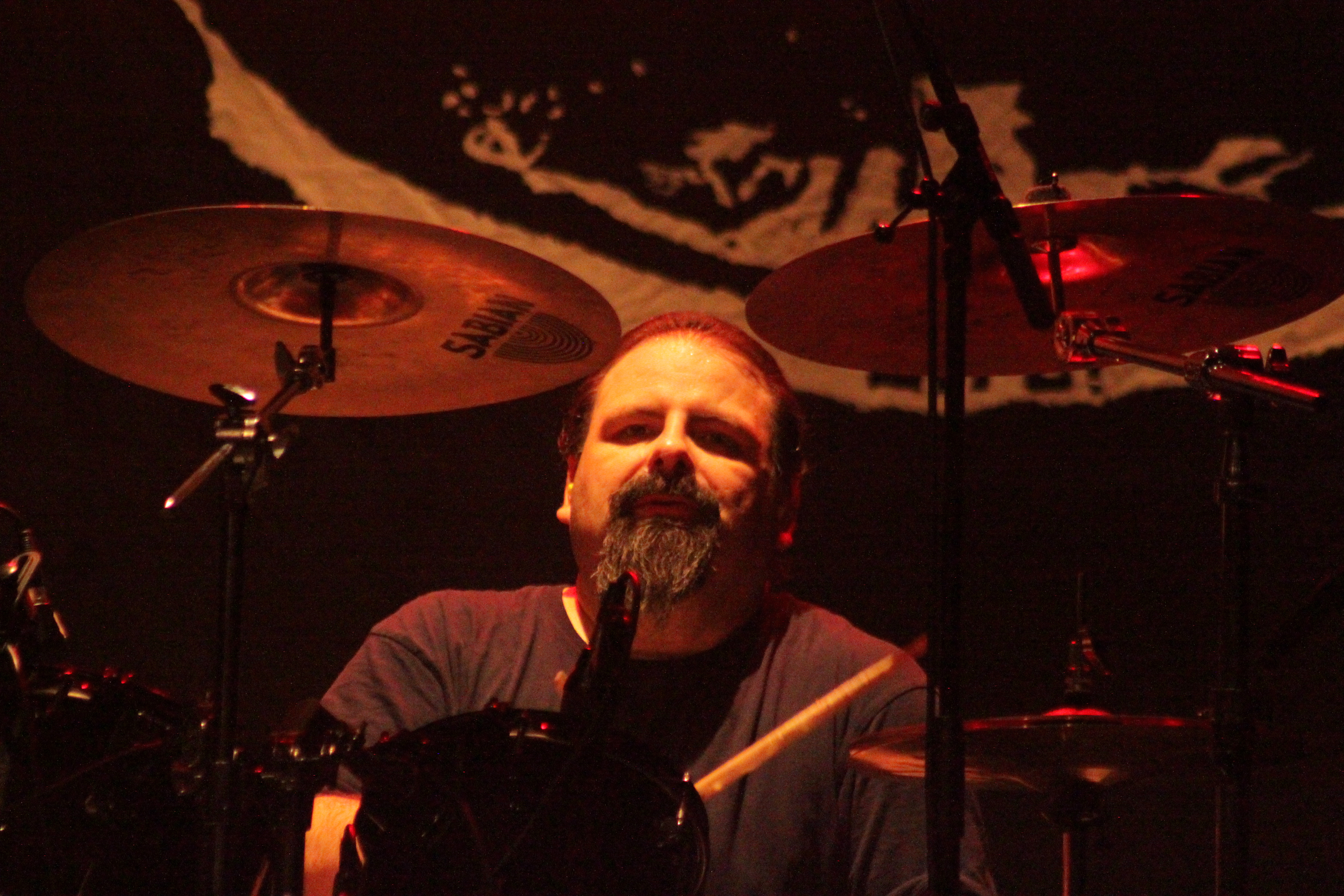
Danny Herrera

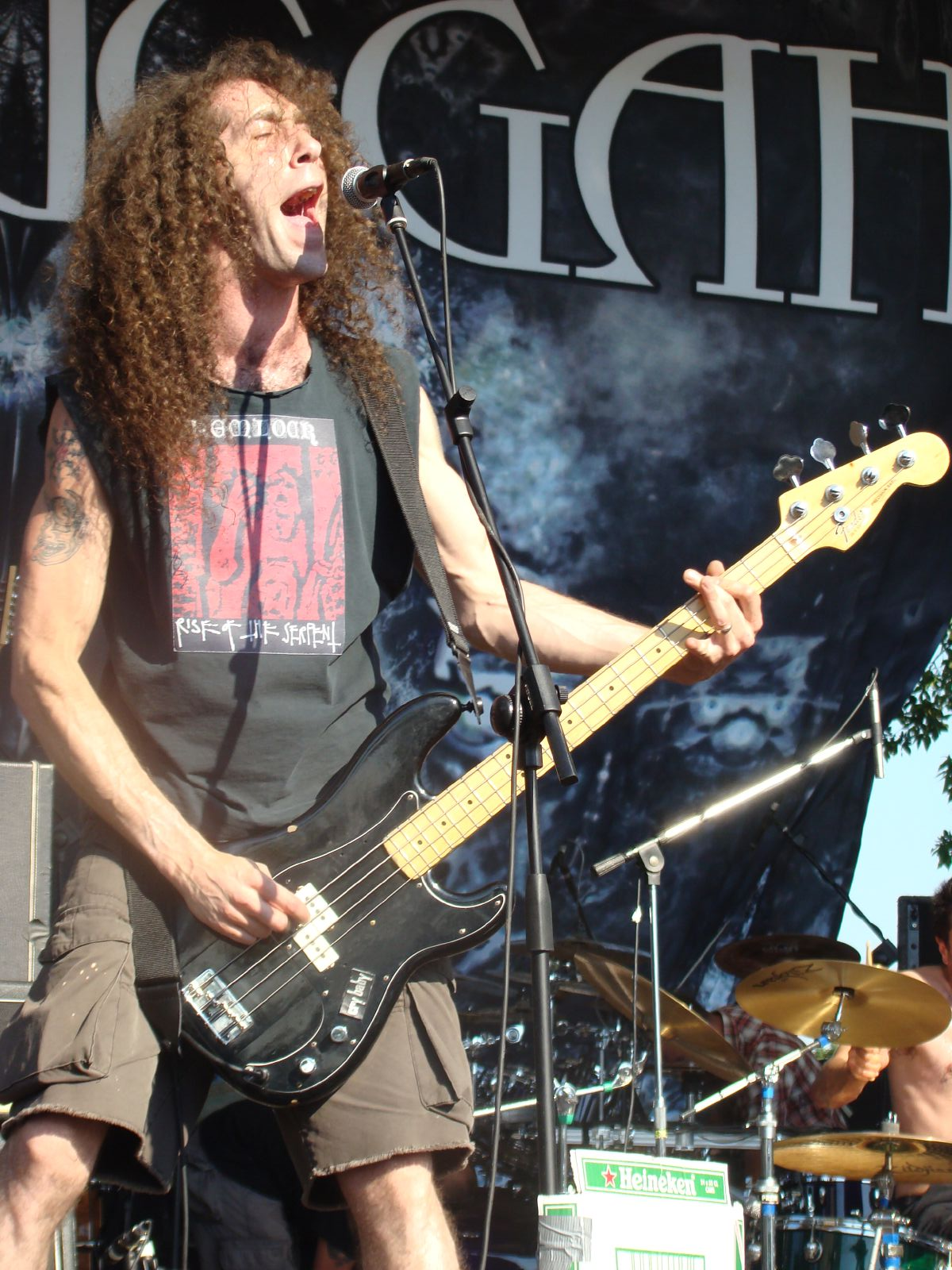
Danny Lilker

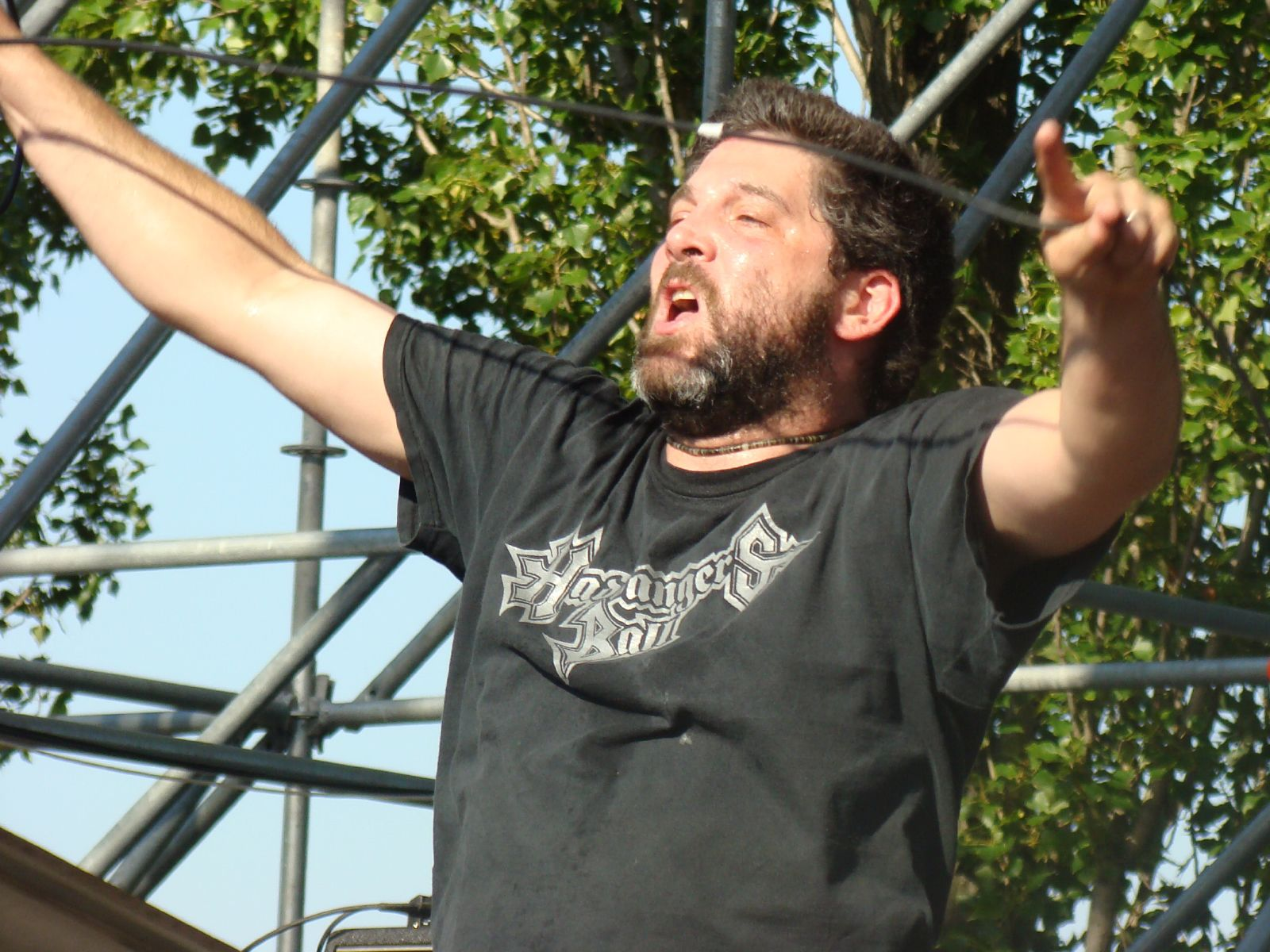
Kevin Sharp

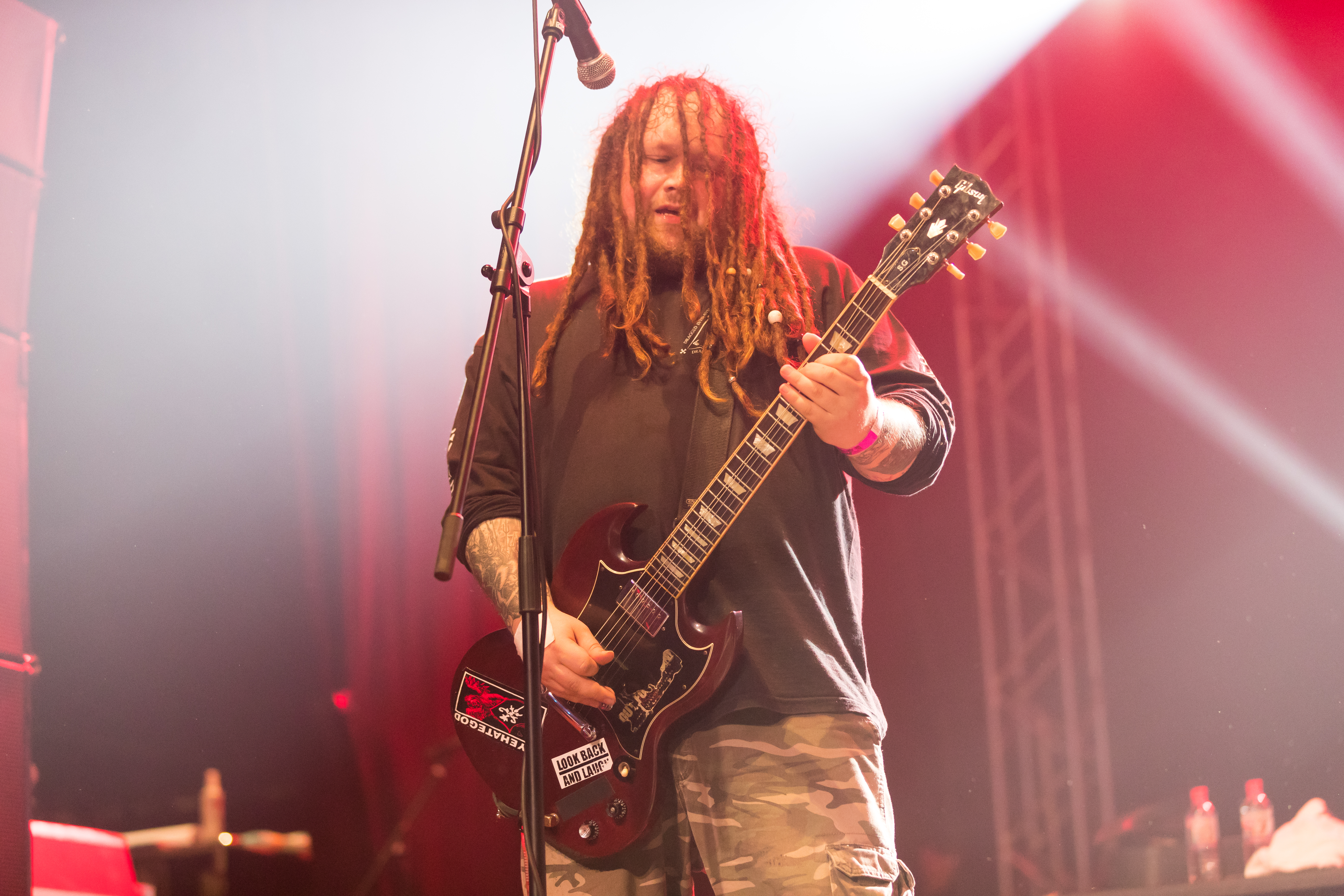
John Cooke

=== Current ===
- Kevin Sharp (Brutal Truth, Primate) – vocals
- Shane Embury (Napalm Death) – guitar, bass
- Danny Herrera (Napalm Death) – drums
- Danny Lilker (Brutal Truth, Nuclear Assault) – bass
- John Cooke (touring musician for Napalm Death) – guitar

=== Former ===
- Buzz Osborne (Melvins, Fantômas) – guitar

== Discography ==
Studio albums

- Retroactive Abortion (2004)
- Poisoned Apple (2008)
- Kick Me Silly VCIII (2016)
- Politics Versus the Erection (2020)
- The Good Ship Lollipop (2023)

Splits

- Split CD/7" with 324 (2006)
- Split 7" with Blood Duster (2008)
