= Something Wicked (album) =

Studio album by Nuclear Assault
- Released: February 23, 1993
- Recorded: August 3 – September 7, 1992
- Studio: IRS (Los Angeles)
- Genre: Thrash metal; groove metal
- Length: 38:17
- Label: I.R.S.
- Producer: Nuclear Assault

Nuclear Assault chronology
Live at the Hammersmith Odeon (1992)	Something Wicked (1993)	Assault & Battery (1997)

Professional ratings
Review scores
Source	Rating
AllMusic	2/5 stars
Collector's Guide to Heavy Metal	6/10

Something Wicked is the fifth studio album by American thrash metal band Nuclear Assault, released on February 23, 1993, by I.R.S. Records.

This is the first and only album not to feature founding members Dan Lilker and Anthony Bramante, as they departed in 1992 before the recording process began. Their replacements, Scott Metaxas and Dave DiPietro, were both part of the final Prophet line-up that recorded the Recycled album; DiPietro had also previously played in T.T. Quick with drummer Glenn Evans. Something Wicked would also be Nuclear Assault's final studio album for 12 years, until the release of Third World Genocide in 2005.

The record is considered a slight departure from the band's early hardcore punk/thrash metal roots, by incorporating a slower groove metal sound. The title track was released as a music video.

Metal Hammer included the album cover on their list of "50 most hilariously ugly rock and metal album covers ever".

== Track listing ==
All songs written and composed by Nuclear Assault

No.	Title	Length
1.	"Something Wicked"	4:42
2.	"Another Violent End"	5:10
3.	"Behind Glass Walls"	4:09
4.	"Chaos"	3:57
5.	"The Forge"	5:14
6.	"No Time"	5:19
7.	"To Serve Man"	2:27
8.	"Madness Descends"	4:31
9.	"Poetic Justice"	2:48
10.	"Art"	0:09
11.	"The Other End" (instrumental)	0:39

== Credits ==
Nuclear Assault

- John Connelly – lead and gang vocals, guitar
- Dave DiPietro – guitar, backing and gang vocals
- Scott Metaxas – bass, backing and gang vocals
- Glenn Evans – drums, gang vocals

Guest musicians

- Steve Hunter – special performance on "Behind Glass Walls"
- Karl Cochran – 12-string guitar on "No Time"
- Ray Gillen, Allan Anderson, Michael Sterlacci – gang vocals

Production

- Nuclear Assault – production
- Scott Gordon – engineer
- George Marino – mastering at Sterling Sound, New York
- Hugh Brown – art direction, cover photo
- Ed Colver – band and eye photos
