= End Time (Brutal Truth album) =

Studio album by Brutal Truth
- Released: September 27, 2011
- Recorded: 2011
- Genre: Grindcore
- Length: 54:21
- Label: Relapse
- Producer: Brutal Truth

Brutal Truth chronology
Evolution Through Revolution (2009)	End Time (2011)

Professional ratings
Review scores
Source	Rating
AllMusic	3/5 stars
Blabbermouth.net	8.5/10
Metal.de	7/10
Metal Storm	9.0/10
PopMatters	5/10

End Time is the sixth and final studio album by grindcore band Brutal Truth. It was released on September 27, 2011, by Relapse Records on CD, LP, and as a deluxe CD box set, which includes "six bonus tracks, a 20-page booklet, six custom art flats, a marijuana-scented disc card, and more".

== Writing ==
Using the track "End Time" as title track of the album was vocalist Kevin Sharpe's idea. Bassist Dan Lilker wrote the lyrics for the song "Twenty Bag": "It's about when we ran out of weed while we were writing. Semi-humorous, but actually quite important. [...] I wrote lyrics about how we do what we do." "Control Room" with "a whole bunch of loops and weird, noisy stuff" is the work of drummer Richard Hoak; Lilker and guitarist Erik Burke didn't perform on this song. The track is too long to fit on the vinyl version of the album.

== Track listing ==
No.	Title	Length
1.	"Malice"	3:27
2.	"Simple Math"	1:26
3.	"End Time"	1:57
4.	"Fuck Cancer"	0:58
5.	"Celebratory Gunfire"	1:28
6.	"Small Talk"	1:41
7.	".58 Caliber"	0:54
8.	"Swift and Violent (Swift version)"	0:46
9.	"Crawling Man Blues"	1:41
10.	"Lottery"	1:10
11.	"Warm Embrace of Poverty"	3:47
12.	"Old World Order"	1:24
13.	"Butcher"	2:54
14.	"Killing Planet Earth"	1:28
15.	"Gut-Check"	2:36
16.	"All Work and No Play"	1:35
17.	"Addicted"	2:03
18.	"Sweet Dreams"	1:30
19.	"Echo Friendly Discharge"	1:49
20.	"Twenty Bag"	0:45
21.	"Trash"	0:05
22.	"Drink Up"	3:42
23.	"Control Room"	15:21

Deluxe edition bonus tracks
No.	Title	Length
24.	"Dead" (Napalm Death cover)	0:04
25.	"Money Stinks" (D.R.I. cover)	0:45
26.	"White Clam Sauce" (N.Y.C. Mayhem cover)	0:08
27.	"Swift and Violent (Violent version)"	0:50
28.	"S.O.B." (S.O.B. cover)	0:08
29.	"The Nightmare Continues" (Discharge cover)	1:18

== Personnel ==
=== Brutal Truth ===
- Kevin Sharp – vocals, production
- Dan Lilker – bass guitar, backing vocals, broken china cymbal, production
- Erik Burke – guitar, production
- Rich Hoak – drums, electronics, production

=== Additional musicians ===
- Robert Piotrowicz – analogue modular synthesizer, electronics (11)
- Adam Jennings – electronics (15)
- Mike Golen – electronics (15)
- Jason Soliday – electronics (15)
- Omar Gonzalez – electronics (15)

=== Technical personnel ===
- Doug White – recording
- Jason P.C. – mixing
- Scott Hull – mastering
- Orion Landau – artwork, art design
- Shauna Montrucchio – photos
