= Survive (Nuclear Assault album) =

Studio album by Nuclear Assault
- Released: June 13, 1988
- Recorded: January–February 1988
- Studios: The Music Grinder and Track Record Studios, Los Angeles, California
- Genres: Thrash metal; crossover thrash
- Length: 30:15
- Label: I.R.S. Metal
- Producer: Randy Burns

Nuclear Assault chronology
The Plague (1987)	Survive (1988)	Handle with Care (1989)

Survive is the second studio album by American thrash metal band Nuclear Assault, released in 1988 on vinyl, compact disc and cassette. Propelled by the single "Brainwashed", Survive was the album that broke Nuclear Assault into the thrash metal mainstream, and was their first album to enter the Billboard 200, reaching number 145 on that chart. "Good Times Bad Times" was originally recorded by Led Zeppelin in 1968.

It is considered an essential release in the thrash metal genre.

== Reception ==
Professional ratings
Review scores
Source	Rating
AllMusic	3/5 stars
Collector's Guide to Heavy Metal	8/10
Metal Forces	9/10

Reviews for Survive have been mostly positive. AllMusic's Eduardo Rivadavia claimed that Nuclear Assault had become "East Coast thrash metal contenders (to a throne pretty much owned by Anthrax) thanks to their politically charged metal fodder." For the album's music, Rivadavia stated, "shows progress, notching up some of the band's most accomplished, lyrically controversial material to date with the title track, 'Rise from the Ashes', and the anti-mainstream media rant 'Brainwashed'." Mike Exley of Metal Forces found Survive "a finely crafted excellent album, that shows the band enlarging their sound beyond the first few tentative progressive steps the band took on The Plague". He wrote that even though "Get Another Quarter" and "PSA" are of lower standard, "the rest of the album has variety and class stamped all over it". Canadian journalist Martin Popoff praised the "pure sound" and the "vastly foucused production", describing the music "like a cross between Dan Lilker's old band Anthrax, Metallica, and the more manic of technical Bay Area speedballs."

Survive entered the Billboard 200 album charts in October 1988, four months after its release. The album peaked at number 145 and remained on the chart for ten weeks. In August 2014, the magazine Revolver placed Survive on its "14 Thrash Albums You Need To Own" list.

== Track listing ==
No.	Title	Writer(s)	Length
1.	"Rise from the Ashes"	Dan Lilker, John Connelly	3:04
2.	"Brainwashed"	Lilker, Connelly	2:40
3.	"F#"	Connelly	2:36
4.	"Survive"	Connelly	2:58
5.	"Fight to Be Free"	Connelly, Lilker	4:22
6.	"Got Another Quarter" (instrumental)	Nuclear Assault	0:19
7.	"Great Depression"	Lilker, Connelly	3:30
8.	"Wired"	Connelly	3:03
9.	"Equal Rights"	Glenn Evans	2:58
10.	"PSA"	Lilker	0:08
11.	"Technology"	Connelly, Glen Cummings	3:13
12.	"Good Times Bad Times" (Led Zeppelin cover)	Jimmy Page, John Paul Jones, John Bonham	2:14
Total length:			30:15

== Credits ==
Nuclear Assault

- John Connelly – lead vocals, guitars
- Anthony Bramante – guitars
- Danny Lilker – bass, backing vocals
- Glenn Evans – drums, percussion

Production

- Randy Burns – producer
- Casey McMakin – engineer
- Matt Frieman – assistant engineer
- Sean Rodgers – cover art
- Nuclear Assault – cover concept
- Miles Copeland – executive producer
