= The Plague (Nuclear Assault EP) =

EP by Nuclear Assault
- Released: March 1987
- Recorded: December 1986 – January 1987
- Studio: The Music Grinder in Los Angeles, California
- Genres: Thrash metal; crossover thrash
- Length: 22:26
- Label: Combat
- Producers: Randy Burns, Steve Sinclair

Nuclear Assault chronology
Game Over (1986)	The Plague (1987)	Survive (1988)

Professional ratings
Review scores
Source	Rating
AllMusic	1/5 stars
Collector's Guide to Heavy Metal	5/10
Crash	4/6

The Plague is the second extended play by the American thrash metal band Nuclear Assault. The six-track EP was originally released as a 12-inch vinyl record through Combat Records in 1987, and later combined with the band's full-length debut, 1986's Game Over, into one CD by Relativity Records.

The EP, which is a "collection of old and new material," was recorded from December 1986 to January 1987 at the Music Grinder studios in Los Angeles, California with producer Randy Burns. The Plague was originally to be titled "Cross of Iron" and to have had a cross as the sleeve artwork. However, the band's label Combat Records cited possible objections that may have come from religious organizations.

== An ode to Mötley Crüe's Vince Neil ==
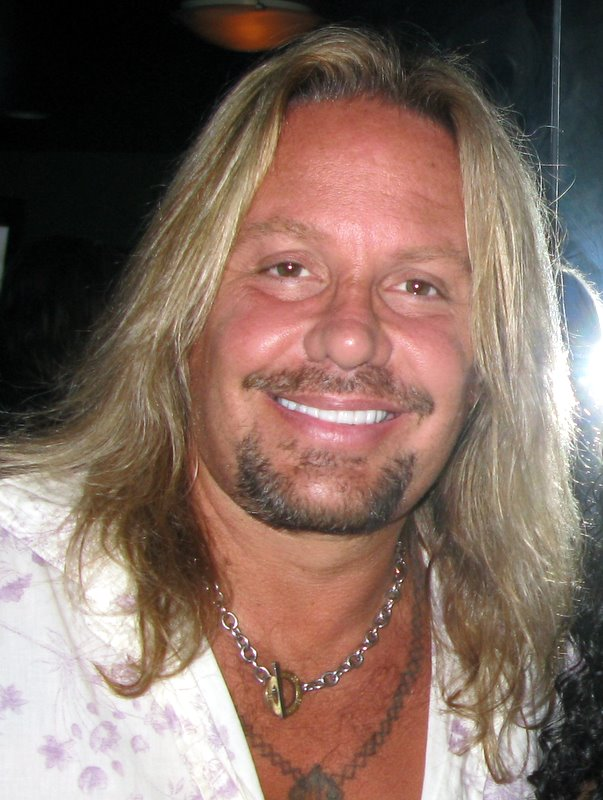
Nuclear Assault made fun of Vince Neil's car crash

According to a retrospective assessment by Eduardo Rivadavia of AllMusic, The Plague is probably best known for the controversial song "Butt Fuck" (later retitled "You Figure It Out"), which managed to introduce Nuclear Assault's dark sense of humor with an "ode" to Mötley Crüe singer Vince Neil's notorious car crash.

The accident occurred on December 8, 1984, when Vince Neil driving while intoxicated hit another car, killing his passenger, drummer Nicholas "Razzle" Dingley of Hanoi Rocks, and permanently injuring the passengers in the car he hit. Neil, who ironically left the accident unscathed, was found guilty of drunk driving and vehicular manslaughter, but he avoided prison by performing community services and paying a substantial cash settlement to his surviving victims.

In an interview with Voices from the Dark Side webzine, the Nuclear Assault's bassist Dan Lilker was asked why the song "Butt Fuck" is dedicated to Vince Neil, and Lilker stated:

The whole concept of that song was that it was fucked up that he [Vince Neil] could get away with driving drunk and killing the guy in the car with him [Razzle]. He didn't do any jail time like you or I would. Just because he was famous, all he had to do was some community service and do some public service announcements about drunk driving. He literally got away with murder. We thought he should've gone to prison and got anally raped like most young men do when they're put in United States prisons. We made the whole thing funny, but we meant it.

== Track listing ==
All tracks are written by Anthony Bramante, John Connelly, Glenn Evans, Dan Lilker.

Side one
No.	Title	Length
1.	"Game Over"	2:38
2.	"Nightmares"	3:56
3.	"Butt Fuck (You Figure It Out)"	2:54

Side two
No.	Title	Length
1.	"Justice"	4:17
2.	"The Plague"	4:54
3.	"Cross of Iron"	3:38

== Personnel ==
Nuclear Assault

- John Connelly – guitars, lead vocals
- Anthony Bramante – guitars
- Dan Lilker – bass, vocals
- Glenn Evans – drums, cover concept

Production

- Randy Burns – producer, assistant engineer
- Casey McMackin – engineer
- Steve Sinclair – executive producer
- Rich Harter – cover concept
- Gerald McLaughlin – illustration
- Mark Weinberg – art direction
