= Pounder (EP) =

EP by Nuclear Assault
- Released: June 1, 2015
- Recorded: January 9–10, 2015
- Studios: Black Dog Digital Studios, Rochester
- Genre: Thrash metal
- Length: 13:34
- Labels: Sidipus, Dry Heave

Nuclear Assault chronology
Third World Genocide (2005)	Pounder (2015)

Professional ratings
Review scores
Source	Rating
Metal Forces	6/10
PlanetMosh	5/5 stars
Terrorizer	7.5/10

Pounder is an EP from Nuclear Assault, released on June 1, 2015. It is the band's first EP since 1988's Good Times, Bad Times, and their first studio recording since 2005's Third World Genocide. This was also their final work as a band to include new material before Nuclear Assault disbanded again in 2022.

== Track listing ==
All tracks are written by Dan Lilker and John Connelly, except where noted.

No.	Title	Length
1.	"Pounder"	3:25
2.	"The Blind Follow (aka Lies)"	3:09
3.	"Analogue Man in a Digital World"	2:42
4.	"Died in Your Arms" (Written by John Connelly)	4:18

== Personnel ==
=== Nuclear Assault ===
- John Connelly – lead vocals, guitars
- Erik Burke – guitars
- Dan Lilker – bass
- Glenn Evans – drums

=== Technical personnel ===
- Robert Blackburn – engineering
- Thomas Johansson – mastering
