= Poisoned apple =

Poisoned apple or Poison Apple may refer to:

- Solanum aculeastrum, poisonous nightshade species only distantly related to true apples
- Poisoned apple, a motif whereby an evil queen turns the princess to eternal sleep in the Snow White fairy tale, its adaptations, retellings, and allusions
- Poisoned Apple, album by Venomous Concept
- "Poison Apple", a track in the electronica album Bitchcraft and a single from it
- Poison Apple, a CIA program in the novel Mission Critical
- "Poison Apple" bar in the Shrek franchise
- Poison Apple young adult book series by Aimee Friedman and other authors
