= Evolution Through Revolution =

- CD cover

Studio album by Brutal Truth
- Released: April 14, 2009
- Recorded: 2008
- Genre: Grindcore
- Length: 41:16
- Label: Relapse
- Producer: Doug White, Sanford Parker

Brutal Truth chronology
Sounds of the Animal Kingdom (1997)	Evolution Through Revolution (2009)	End Time (2011)

Alternative cover
- LP cover

Evolution Through Revolution is the fifth studio album by grindcore band Brutal Truth. This was the band's first album since 1997, recorded after an eight-year hiatus. Evolution Through Revolution was released on April 14, 2009. It sold around 1000 copies in its first week, and debuted at No. 65 on the Top New Artist Albums (Heatseekers) chart.

== History ==
Brutal Truth went on hiatus in 1998, following their tour for Sounds of the Animal Kingdom. In 2006, the band reformed to record a song for the Eyehategod tribute album For the Sick. Guitarist Gurn was later replaced by Erik Burke of Lethargy. In late 2007, Brutal Truth recorded four new original songs for This Comp Kills Fascists Vol. 1. In October 2008, the band entered the studio to record 24 songs for a new album, with work on the album being completed in January 2009. Evolution Through Revolution was released April 14, 2009. A deluxe edition was released by iTunes featuring two bonus tracks.

== Reception ==
Professional ratings
Review scores
Source	Rating
About.com	4.5/5 stars
Allmusic	3.5/5 stars
Blabbermouth.net	8.5/10 stars
Decibel	favorable

Evolution Through Revolution sold around 1000 copies in its first week, and debuted at No. 65 on the Top New Artist Albums (Heatseekers) chart.

The album was well received by critics. Justin M. Norton of About.com called the album "brash, experimental and multi-faceted", and found "Turmoil" to be "so fast it appears on the verge of collapsing on itself". Greg Prato of Allmusic commented that Brutal Truth delivered "good ol' fashioned grindcore", complete with "whiplash-inducing 'zero to 60' tempos, guttural growls, noise guitar [and] airtight drumming". Ryan Ogle of Blabbermouth.net called the album "chaotically creative", and praised "seemingly impossible tempo shifts" and the "grating, yet discernable tone and ear-bleeding servings of feedback". He then compared the album to imagining "a variable speed chainsaw where have the blades have been replaced with sledgehammers and then taking it on a frenzied rampage through a shopping mall."

Critics also appreciated the addition of Erik Burke. Saby Reyes-Kulkarni of Nashville Scene said the addition of Burke "helped propel Evolution Through Revolution into even more chaotic terrain than the band has explored in the past". Norton agreed, saying, "fresh blood certainly helped", as did Ogle, who thought Burke "brings a whole new brand of dementia to the band".

== Track listing ==
No.	Title	Length
1.	"Sugardaddy"	2:36
2.	"Turmoil"	1:04
3.	"Daydreamer"	1:46
4.	"On the Hunt"	1:00
5.	"Fist in Mouth"	1:57
6.	"Get a Therapist...Spare the World"	2:37
7.	"War Is Good"	0:48
8.	"Evolution Through Revolution"	2:52
9.	"Powder Burn"	1:54
10.	"Attack Dog"	0:42
11.	"Branded"	0:06
12.	"Detached"	3:01
13.	"Global Good Guy"	1:43
14.	"Humpty Finance"	1:55
15.	"Semi-Automatic Carnation"	2:55
16.	"Itch"	2:44
17.	"Afterworld"	3:26
18.	"Lifer"	2:53
19.	"Bob Dylan Wrote Propaganda Songs" (Minutemen cover)	1:22
20.	"Grind Fidelity"	3:55
21.	"Forever in Daze" (only available on LP)	1:30
22.	"Dogs of War" (only available on LP)	0:39

iTunes deluxe edition bonus tracks
No.	Title	Length
21.	"Walking Corpse 2112"	1:15
22.	"You Should Know Better"	1:48

== Personnel ==
=== Brutal Truth ===
- Kevin Sharp – vocals, artwork
- Dan Lilker – bass guitar, backing vocals
- Erik Burke – guitar
- Rich Hoak – drums

=== Additional personnel ===
- Doug White – recording (at Watchmen Studios)
- Sanford Parker – recording (at Volume Studios)
- Jason P.C. – mixing, mastering (at Goatsound)
- Scott Kinkade – photography
- Scott Hull – mastering
