= Retroactive Abortion =

Studio album by Venomous Concept
- Released: June 29, 2004
- Recorded: October 5–10, 2003
- Genre: Hardcore punk; grindcore
- Length: 27:11
- Label: Ipecac
- Producer: Venomous Concept

Venomous Concept chronology
| Retroactive Abortion (2004) | Split with 324 (2006) |

Retroactive Abortion is the debut album by American grindcore band Venomous Concept. It was released on June 29, 2004, through Ipecac Recordings. In 2006, Belgian record label Hypertension Records re-issued the album on vinyl.

== Critical reception ==
Professional ratings
Review scores
| Source | Rating |
|---|---|
| Stylus Magazine | D− |

The album generally received mixed reviews from music critics. Scott McKeating of Stylus Magazine thought that the album was "defiantly loud, messy and loose, but it could’ve done with being a lot more abrasive; the lo-fi production sounds underdone." McKeating concluded: "Chopped down to a fistful of songs this would’ve made a great EP, but even at thirty minutes this album is way too long." Exclaim! critic Greg Pratt wrote: "Venomous Concept had brilliance written all over it. Ultimately, it falls a bit short of that however, being more of a fun, jam-room one-off project." PopMatters' Adrien Begrand described the record as "a moderately enjoyable hardcore album… if you ignore the lyrics, that is."

== Track listing ==
1. "Weirdo" – 2:21
2. "Oink!" – 1:04
3. "Rhetoric" – 2:30
4. "I Said It Before" – 1:51
5. "Freakbird" – 1:29
6. "Infest" – 0:36
7. "Life's Line" – 1:54
8. "Idiot Parade" – 2:31
9. "Hard On" – 2:00
10. "Group Hug" – 1:33
11. "Anti-Social" – 1:12
12. "Run Around" – 1:25
13. "Smash" – 1:41
14. "Monkey See - Monkey Beat" – 1:10
15. "Total Recall" – 1:54
16. "Braincrash" – 2:14
17. "Think!"
- "Total War" (QuickTime bonus video)

== Personnel ==
Venomous Concept

- Shane Embury – bass guitar
- Kevin Sharp – vocals
- Buzz Osborne – guitar
- Danny Herrera – drums

Other personnel

- Oscar Garcia – additional vocals
- Venomous Concept – production
- Huey Dee – engineering
- Phil Wright – assistant engineering
