= Brutal Truth =

American grindcore band

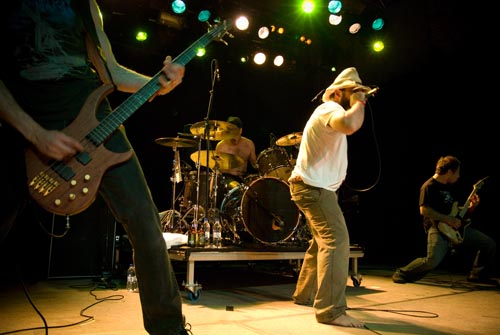
- Brutal Truth performs at Hole in the Sky in 2008

Background information
- Origin: Rochester, New York, United States
- Genres: Grindcore; death metal
- Years active: 1990–1999, 2006–2014
- Labels: Earache, Relapse, Deaf American, Relativity
- Past members: Kevin Sharp; Dan Lilker; Brent "Gurn" McCarty; Scott Lewis; Richard Hoak; Jody Roberts; Erik Burke; Dan O'Hare
- Website: Brutaltruth.bandcamp.com

Brutal Truth was an American grindcore band from New York City, formed by bass guitarist Dan Lilker in 1990. The group disbanded in 1999, but reformed in 2006 and continued to release music until 2014.

== History ==
Brutal Truth was formed in 1990 in New York City. Lilker was known for working with Anthrax, Nuclear Assault, and Stormtroopers of Death. Brutal Truth signed to Earache Records, on which they released two albums, Extreme Conditions Demand Extreme Responses and Need to Control, as well as the EP Perpetual Conversion, and 7-inch singles for the songs "Ill Neglect" and "Godplayer". During this time, music videos were made for the songs "Ill Neglect", "Collateral Damage" and "Godplayer". Brutal Truth were frustrated with Earache Records and switched to Relapse Records, known for its roster of grindcore acts, with whom they stayed until the band's demise.

Brutal Truth toured the US with Carcass, Napalm Death and Cathedral on the Campaign for Musical Destruction tour in 1992.

With Relapse, they released the mini album Kill Trend Suicide, the full-length Sounds of the Animal Kingdom and the double CD live album Goodbye Cruel World. The band has released many split 7-inch singles on smaller labels, with most of these out of print and difficult to find. The songs from these 7-inch singles were collected on the second disc of Goodbye Cruel World.

The band disbanded around 1999 due to internal conflicts about finances and management.

In 2001, the Guinness Book of Records awarded Brutal Truth the record for "shortest music video" for their video "Collateral Damage", which is 2.18 seconds long and consists of 48 still images in rapid succession followed by a clip of an explosion.

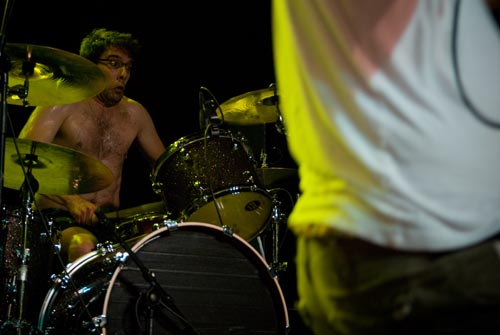
Richard Hoak, Hole in the Sky 2008

Drummer Richard Hoak sings and drums for a project titled Total Fucking Destruction. Kevin Sharp released an album with Venomous Concept in 2004, a hardcore punk band featuring members from the Melvins and Napalm Death. He was a member of Australian grind band Damaged for little over a year in 1999. He is involved with the Atlanta-based, hardcore-metal, grindcore band Primate, with guitarist Bill Kelliher from Mastodon. Dan Lilker plays for a host of bands and is currently bassist for the reunited Nuclear Assault.

Brutal Truth reformed in 2006 with three-quarters of the final lineup returning (Lilker, Hoak and Sharp). Guitarist Erik Burke (of Lethargy) replaced Brent McCarty.

On July 8, 2008, four new Brutal Truth tracks were released on the This Comp Kills Fascists compilation. That was the first new material from the band in almost ten years.

On January 21, 2009, it was announced that Brutal Truth had finished recording a new album, Evolution Through Revolution. It was released on April 14 in North America, April 17 in Germany and on April 20 worldwide. The band made the album available via streaming from their website. A video for "Sugardaddy/Branded" was released on July 17, 2009.

On September 27, 2011, Brutal Truth released End Time on Relapse. In 2012, the band participated in the Lausanne Underground Film and Music Festival, performing material composed by Robert Piotrowicz. In October 2012, Dan O'Hare took over guitar. Brutal Truth would release a split with Bastard Noise on November 11, 2013.

On January 10, 2014, Lilker announced that he would retire from full-time recording and touring on October 18, 2014, his 50th birthday. Brutal Truth disbanded on that day.

== Musical style ==
Alex Distefano of OC Weekly said of the band's sound: "The level of intensity in terms of drums, guitar speed and vocals was off the charts. This was a group of east coast dudes who loved death metal and hardcore punk. With grindcore these two sounds merged, and the band took the sound to an extreme level."

== Legacy ==
Alex Distefano of OC Weekly said: "The band has always been recognized as being true to the underground DIY spirit."

== Band members ==
- Dan Lilker – bass guitar, backing vocals (1990–1998, 2006–2014), lead vocals (1990)
- Brent "Gurn" McCarty – guitars (1990–1998)
- Scott Lewis – drums (1990–1993)
- Kevin Sharp – lead vocals (1990–1998, 2006–2014)
- Richard Hoak – drums (1994–1998, 2006–2014)
- Jody Roberts – guitars (2006–2007)
- Erik Burke – guitars (2007–2013)
- Dan O'Hare – guitars (2013–2014)

== Discography ==
=== Studio albums ===
- Extreme Conditions Demand Extreme Responses (1992, Earache Records)
- Need to Control (1994, Earache Records)
- Kill Trend Suicide (1996, Relapse Records)
- Sounds of the Animal Kingdom (1997, Relapse Records)
- Evolution Through Revolution (2009, Relapse Records)
- End Time (2011, Relapse Records)

=== Extended plays ===
- The Birth of Ignorance demo (1990)
- Ill Neglect (1992, Earache Records)
- Perpetual Conversion (1993, Earache Records)
- Godplayer (1994, Earache Records)
- Machine Parts +4 (1996, Relapse Records)
- Split 7-inches 7-inch release with the songs from the split with Converge on one side and the songs from the split with Violent Society on the other side (2008, Relapse Records)

=== DVDs ===
- For the Ugly and Unwanted – This Is Grindcore (2009, Season of Mist)

=== Splits ===
- split with Spazz (1996, Bovine Records)
- split with Rupture (1997, Relapse Records)
- split with Converge (1997, Hydra Head Records)
- split with Melvins (1997, Reptile Records)
- split with Violent Society (1997, Relapse Records)
- split with Narcosis/Total Fucking Destruction (2007, Calculated Risk Records)
- First United Meth Church split with Blood Duster (2009, Zenith Records)
- The Axiom of Post Inhumanity split with Bastard Noise (2013, Relapse Records)

=== Other releases ===
- Goodbye Cruel World (compilation of live material and rarities) (1999, Relapse Records)
- For Drug Crazed Grindfreaks Only! Live at Noctum Studios + 1 (2008, Relapse Records)
- This Comp Kills Fascists Vol. 1 (2008, Relapse Records)
