= Poisoned Apple =

Studio album by Venomous Concept
- Released: April 25, 2008
- Genre: Grindcore; hardcore punk
- Length: 34:00
- Label: Century Media

Venomous Concept chronology
Split with Blood Duster (2008)	Poisoned Apple (2008)	Kick Me Silly VCIII (2016)

Poisoned Apple is the second album by Venomous Concept. It was released on April 25, 2008 in Europe and May 13, 2008 in North America.

== Critical reception ==
Professional ratings
Review scores
Source	Rating
About.com	3/5 stars

The album generally received positive reviews from music critics. About.com critic Chad Bowar described the record as "a great outlet for Venomous Concept to take a break from their other bands and let off some steam and aggression and take us along for the ride." Greg Pratt of Exclaim! wrote: "Venomous Concept have surpassed side-project status with this disc and have crafted something that will tide us over."

== Track listing ==
1. "Drop Dead" – 2:07
2. "Toxic Kiss" – 0:56
3. "Life" – 1:47
4. "Water Cooler" – 2:58
5. "P.R.I." – 1:32
6. "Artist Friendly" – 1:30
7. "A Case of the Mondays" – 2:37
8. "Every Mother's Son" – 1:54
9. "Worker's Unite" – 1:39
10. "Half Full?" – 2:56
11. "Check Out" – 3:26
12. "White Devil" – 1:53
13. "Hero" – 2:39
14. "Three" – 1:17
15. "Screwball" – 1:48
16. "Chaos!" – 1:28
17. "Think?" – 1:33

== Personnel ==
- Kevin Sharp – vocals
- Shane Embury – guitar
- Danny Lilker – bass guitar
- Danny Herrera – drums
