= Assault & Battery (Nuclear Assault album) =

Compilation album by Nuclear Assault
- Released: November 5, 1997
- Genre: Thrash metal
- Label: Receiver Records

Nuclear Assault chronology
Something Wicked (1993)	Assault & Battery (1997)	Alive Again (2003)

Professional ratings
Review scores
Source	Rating
Allmusic	4/5 stars

Assault & Battery is a compilation album released by Receiver Records in 1997. Most tracks were previously unreleased or were b-sides from singles.

== Track listing ==
1. "Happy Days"
2. "Enter Darkness"
3. "Leaders"
4. "Hang the Pope"
5. "Radiation Sickness"
6. "Hypocrisy"
7. "Behind Glass Walls"
8. "No Time"
9. "Hour Shower"
10. "Saddam"
11. "Preaching to the Deaf"
12. "Hang the Pope"
13. "Ping"
14. "Torture Tactics" (live)
15. "Fight to be Free" (live)
16. "Trail of Tears" (live)
17. "Ping Again" (live)
18. "Butt Fuck" (live)
