= T.T. Quick =

American heavy metal band

- Origin: New York/New Jersey, U.S.
- Genres: Heavy metal
- Years active: 1979–present
- Labels: Avalanche, Megaforce SPV, Halycon, Ocean
- Members: David DiPietro; Walt Fortune; Glenn Evans; Erik Ferro; Dick Craig; Tom Capobianco; Chris Goger; Curt Benson; John Mollima; David Henry
- Past members: Mark Tornillo; A.J. Pero

T.T. Quick is an American heavy metal band from Osbornsville, New Jersey, formed in 1979. They are best known for their 1986 album Metal Of Honor and vocalist Mark Tornillo, who has been the frontman for German heavy metal band Accept since 2009.

== History ==
The band started on the highly competitive New Jersey bar band cover music circuit. In 1983 Jon Zazula began the iconic Megaforce Records label, signing T.T. Quick, along with Metallica, Anthrax and Overkill and several others. The band would release their eponymous debut EP on the Megaforce subsidiary Avalanche imprint in 1984 after which drummer Glenn Evans left to join Nuclear Assault. In 1985, T.T. Quick contributed the non-EP cut "A Wing & A Prayer" to the From The Megavault Megaforce compilation. The highly regarded Metal Of Honor album with Erik Ferro on drums would follow in 1986.

Following a lull of several years the reunion release Sloppy Seconds would debut on the Halcyon label in 1989 to be followed by the Thrown Together Live opus in 1992. A breakup and reunion would produce the CD entitled Ink in 2000.

Guitarist Dave DiPietro would join Halycon label mates Prophet on their 1991 release Recycled before reuniting with Glenn Evans in Nuclear Assault and appearing on 1993's Something Wicked as well as touring the U.S. and Europe in support of the album.

Recognized as outstanding players, guitarist Dave DiPietro in particular stood out as a mentor to Zakk Wylde and Dave Sabo, who would later star with Ozzy Osbourne and Skid Row respectively.

== Discography ==
=== Studio recordings ===
- TT Quick EP (Avalanche/Megaforce, 1984)
- Metal Of Honor (Island/Megaforce, 1986)
- Sloppy Seconds (Halycon, 1989)
- Ink (Ocean, 2000)

=== Live albums ===
- Thrown Together Live (Halycon, 1992)

=== Compilations ===
- From The Megavault (Megaforce, 1985)

== Members ==
- David DiPietro – guitars 1983 – Present
- Walt Fortune – bass 198? - Present
- Mark Tornillo – lead vocals 1979–Present
- A. J. Pero – drums 1987–1988 (died 2015)
- Glenn Evans – drums 1983–1985
- Erik Ferro – drums 1984–1986, 1988–1990, 1991 – 2023 (died 2023)
- Tom Capobianco – drums 1990–1991
- Dick Craig – drums 1979–1981
- Chris Goger – drums 1981–1983, 1986–1987
- Curt Benson – bass 1979–1981
- John Mollima – guitars 1979–1983
- David Henry – guitars 1979–1982
