= Kill Trend Suicide =

Studio album by Brutal Truth
- Released: October 1, 1996
- Genre: Grindcore; experimental metal
- Length: 33:51
- Label: Relapse
- Producer: Brutal Truth

Brutal Truth chronology
Need to Control (1994)	Kill Trend Suicide (1996)	Sounds of the Animal Kingdom (1997)

Professional ratings
Review scores
Source	Rating
Allmusic	2.5/5 stars

Kill Trend Suicide is the third studio album by grindcore band Brutal Truth, released on October 1, 1996 by Relapse Records. It was labelled as a "mini-album" due to it being longer than an EP but not as long as a standard album. This release shows a shift from the grindcore sound that the band had previously played, by incorporating elements of crust punk, rock, and experimental music. Riffs that sound similar to that of Frank Zappa can also be found on this mini-album, most prominent being on the song "Zombie".

== Track listing ==
No.	Title	Length
1.	"Blind Leading the Blind"	1:47
2.	"Pass Some Down"	2:04
3.	"Let's Go to War"	1:28
4.	"Hypocrite Invasion"	2:53
5.	"Everflow"	1:01
6.	"Zombie"	2:40
7.	"Homesick"	1:17
8.	"Humanity's Folly"	2:49
9.	"I Killed My Family" (YDI cover)	2:43
10.	"Kill Trend Suicide" (The song "Kill Trend Suicide" ends at 2:40. At minute 13:00, after 10 minutes and 20 seconds of silence, begins an untitled hidden song.)	15:10
