= Dan Lilker =

American musician (born 1964)

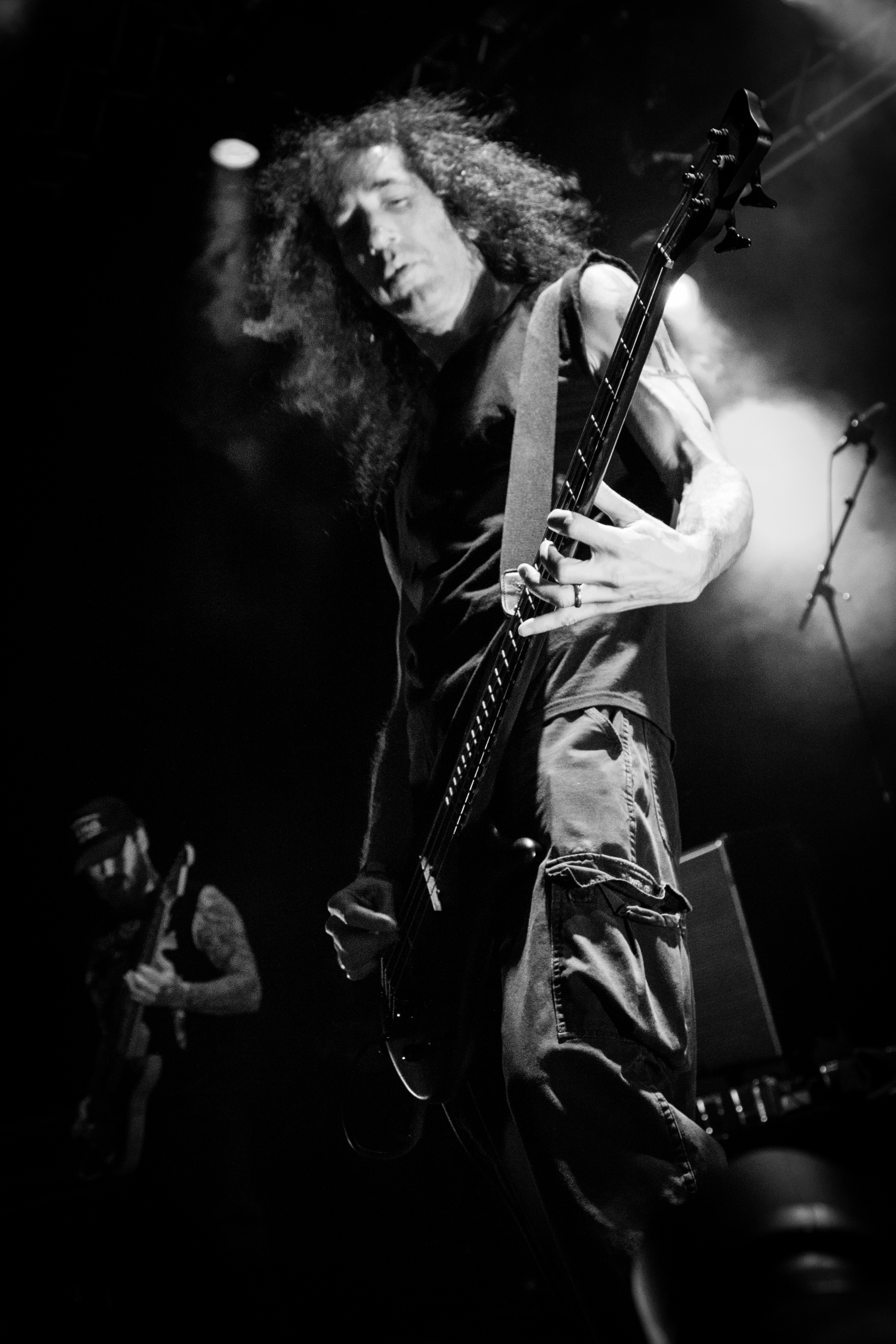
- Lilker in 2015

Background information
- Born: Daniel Adam Lilker; October 18, 1964 (age 61); New York City, U.S.
- Genres: Extreme metal; hardcore punk; thrash metal; grindcore; death metal
- Occupations: Musician
- Instruments: Bass guitar, guitar, piano, drums, vocals
- Years active: 1981–present
- Member of: United Forces; Venomous Concept
- Formerly of: Anthrax; S.O.D.; Nuclear Assault; Brutal Truth; The Ravenous; Holy Moses; Nokturnal Hellstorm; Exit-13; Hemlock; Nunfuckritual; Extra Hot Sauce

Daniel Adam Lilker (born October 18, 1964) is an American musician best known as a bass player, but also guitarist, pianist, drummer, and vocalist. He has played bass in numerous heavy metal bands, including Anthrax, Nuclear Assault, S.O.D. and Holy Moses, and grindcore bands Brutal Truth and Exit-13.

== Biography ==
Lilker was the bassist for the thrash metal band Nuclear Assault and was a founding member of Anthrax with Scott Ian. Lilker was then playing rhythm guitar and recorded bass guitar and co-wrote on their first album, Fistful of Metal (1984). Not long after the release of that album, he was dismissed from Anthrax and replaced on bass by one of the band's roadies Frank Bello. Despite this, Lilker has remained cordial with the band, receiving a co-writing credits for material on their next two albums Spreading the Disease (1985) and Among the Living (1987). Lilker also filled in for Bello on Anthrax's spring 2024 tour dates.

In addition to Anthrax and Nuclear Assault, Lilker has played bass in grindcore band Brutal Truth and crossover band Stormtroopers of Death with Scott Ian and Charlie Benante (from Anthrax), and Billy Milano (Anthrax roadie, M.O.D. singer). He has also played bass with Exit-13, Malformed Earthborn, The Ravenous, Overlord Exterminator, Venomous Concept, Crucifist, Nokturnal Hellstorm, Nunfuckritual and Extra Hot Sauce.

During his tenure with Anthrax, Lilker played bass by fingerpicking, but since forming Nuclear Assault, he has mostly been using a pick.

Lilker played on Holy Moses' 1994 No Matter What's the Cause. He is known for his fast, guitar-like riffing through heavy distortion. Lilker has been a columnist with Zero Tolerance Magazine since the publication's inception in 2005. In 2009, it was reported that Chicago journalist Dave Hofer was writing a biography of Lilker.

Lilker formed United Forces with Stormtroopers of Death bandmate Billy Milano as their singer in 2012.

In January 2014, Lilker announced his plans to retire from being a full-time recording and touring musician. He also announced that Brutal Truth would break up on his 50th birthday. However, Lilker remained a member of Nuclear Assault, who released new material in 2015 for the EP Pounder, and had continued performing live sporadically until their breakup in 2022.

== Discography ==
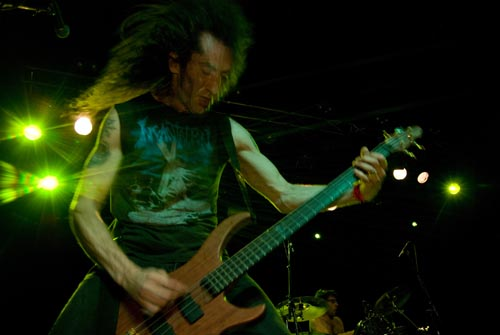
Lilker in 2007

=== Extra Hot Sauce ===
Date of release	Title	Label
1989	Taco of Death	Peaceville Records

=== Nuclear Assault ===
Date of release	Title	Label	US sales
1986	Brain Death (EP)	Combat Records / Under One Flag	5,000
March 10, 1986	Game Over	Combat Records / Under One Flag	90,000
1987	The Plague (EP)	Combat Records / Under One Flag	80,000
1988	Fight to Be Free (EP)	Relativity / Under One Flag	15,000
1988	Good Times, Bad Times (EP)	Under One Flag	10,000
June 13, 1988	Survive	Combat Records / Under One Flag	100,000
November 23, 1989	Handle with Care	Relativity / Under One Flag	500,000
1989	Handle with Care European Tour '89		100,000
September 10, 1991	Out of Order	Relativity / Under One Flag	40,000
1991	Radiation Sickness		50,000
May 19, 1992	Live at the Hammersmith Odeon	Relativity Records / Roadrunner	150,000
July 1, 2003	Alive Again	Screaming Ferret / Steamhammer	45,000
August 29, 2005	Third World Genocide	Screaming Ferret Wreckords	50,000
2015	Pounder (EP)	Sidipus, Dry Heave	

=== Brutal Truth ===
Date of release	Title	Label	US sales
October 6, 1992	Extreme Conditions Demand Extreme Responses	Earache Records	40,000
October 25, 1994	Need to Control	Earache Records	30,000
October 1, 1996	Kill Trend Suicide (EP)	Relapse Records	20,000
September 23, 1997	Sounds of the Animal Kingdom	Relapse Records	40,000
2000	For Drug Crazed Grindfreaks Only!	Solardisk	5,000
April 20, 2009	Evolution Through Revolution	Relapse Records	20,000
September 27, 2011	End Time	Relapse Records	

=== Anthrax ===
Date of release	Title	Label	US sales
January 1984	Fistful of Metal	Megaforce Records	150,000
1992	Armed and Dangerous (reissue)	Megaforce Records	

=== Stormtroopers of Death ===
Date of release	Title	Label	US sales
December 1985	Speak English or Die	Megaforce Records	100,000
1992	Live at Budokan	Megaforce Records	100,000
May 18, 1999	Bigger than the Devil	Nuclear Blast Records	50,000
1999	Seasoning the Obese: 7" split with Yellow Machinegun	Rotten Orange/Howling Bull	75,000
August 21, 2007	Rise of the Infidels	Megaforce Records	20,000

=== The Ravenous ===
Date of release	Title	Label	US sales
August 29, 2000	Assembled in Blasphemy	Hammerheart	50,000
2002	Three on a Meathook (EP)	Red Stream	10,000
February 24, 2004	Blood Delirium	Red Stream	10,000

=== Venomous Concept ===
Date of release	Title	Label
2008	Poisoned Apple	Century Media

=== Holy Moses ===
Date of release	Title	Label
1994	No Matter What's the Cause	SPV/Steamhammer
