= Nuclear Assault =

American thrash metal band

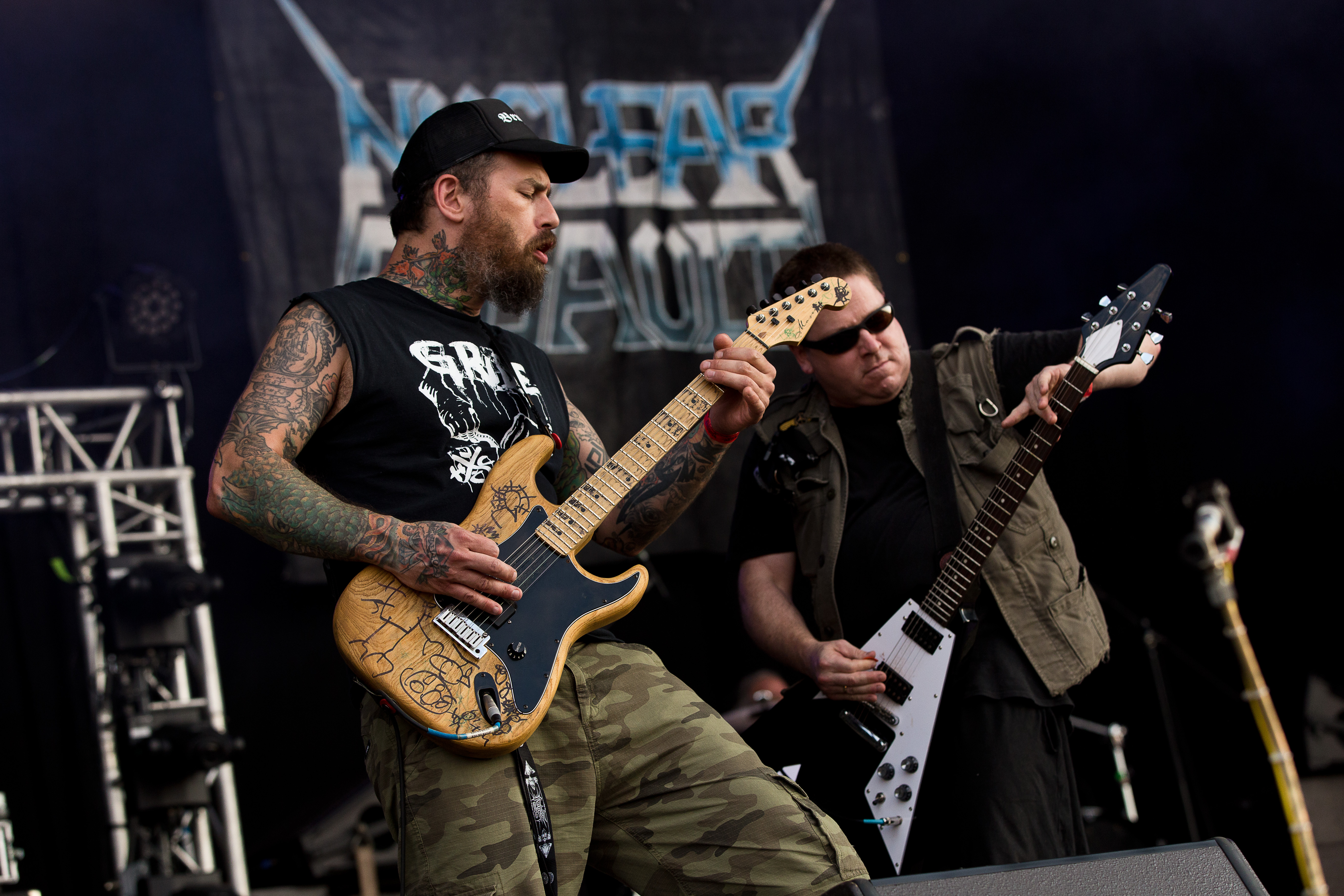
- Erik Burke (left) and John Connelly at Party.San Open Air in 2015

Background information
- Origin: New York City, U.S.
- Genres: Thrash metal; crossover thrash
- Years active: 1984–1995; 1997–1998; 2001–2008; 2011–2022
- Labels: I.R.S.; Relativity; Combat; In-Effect; Receiver; SPV
- Past members: John Connelly; Dan Lilker; Glenn Evans; Anthony Bramante; Dave DiPietro; Scott Metaxas; Eric Burke; Scott Harrington

Nuclear Assault was an American thrash metal band formed in New York City in 1984. Part of the mid-to-late 1980s thrash metal movement, they were one of the main bands of the genre to emerge from the East Coast, along with Overkill, Whiplash, Toxik, Carnivore, and Anthrax, the last of which was co-founded by Nuclear Assault bassist Dan Lilker, who had been fired from Anthrax shortly after the release of their first album. Nuclear Assault released five full-length albums and toured relentlessly throughout the 1980s and early 1990s, and broke up in 1995. The band reunited briefly in 1997, again from 2001 to 2008, and most recently from 2011 to 2022.

Nuclear Assault released six studio albums, in addition to two live albums, four EPs and one compilation album. Their most successful records are Survive (1988) and Handle with Care (1989), which peaked at Nos. 145 and 126 on the Billboard 200 chart, respectively. Other than four new songs in 2015 on the EP Pounder, the band did not release any more full-length studio albums after 2005's Third World Genocide, but continued to perform live sporadically over the following years before calling it quits once again in 2022.

== History ==
=== Early career (1984–1985) ===
After the release of Anthrax's debut album Fistful of Metal, bassist Dan Lilker, a founding member of the group, was fired by the band. He decided to pursue a more aggressive style of music and formed Nuclear Assault with guitarist/vocalist John Connelly, who had been part of an early version of Anthrax. They were joined by guitarist Mike Bogush and drummer Scott Duboys. They then recorded the first of two demos, which included the songs "Stranded in Hell", "The Plague", and "Hang the Pope".

The group's first live performance was at the Union Jack in South River, New Jersey, in late 1984. Bogush was later replaced by Anthony Bramante. Bramante's first live performance with the group was at L'Amour in Brooklyn, New York, in April 1985. Shortly after the performance, Duboys left the band and was replaced by drummer Glenn Evans formerly of New Jersey-based band T.T. Quick.

=== First three albums and rise to fame (1986–1990) ===
Nuclear Assault's second demo Live, Suffer, Die was recorded in 1985 and they began touring the United States consistently. The band signed a multi-album contract with Combat Records and recorded the Game Over album in April 1986, released to critical acclaim later that year. The album cut 'Nuclear War' had its broadcast premiere on 92.3fm in NYC (K-Rock), when guest host Chuck Kaye (DJ, VJ, Host, MC, Booker of L'Amour) brought his test pressing with him. Game Over was followed by an extended play called The Plague, which was released to coincide with a 1987 European tour with Agent Steel and Atomkraft. Later, feeling constrained by their contract with Combat, the band signed with I.R.S. Records and released Survive in 1988. The album reached number 145 on the U.S. Billboard 200 chart and Nuclear Assault set off on a 180-day world tour in the United States and Europe; first as an opening act for Slayer and later headlining with British group Acid Reign as a support act. The Survive soundtrack was featured in the underground film on I.R.S. Media Blood & Concrete. The band's next album, 1989's Handle with Care, would see the band at their commercial peak, hitting the U.S. chart at number 126, and peaking in the UK Albums Chart at No. 60, with more touring, including a trip to Japan and a U.S. tour opening for Testament and Savatage. The band released their first live album, Live at the Hammersmith Odeon, in 1990, but internal troubles were causing problems for the band.

=== Two more albums, departure of Lilker and split (1991–1995) ===
Constant touring and recording was taking its toll on the band, and there was a rumor that the band might split. The recording of Out of Order was problematic as all four members were in the process of making solo projects. Lead songwriter Connelly was conspicuously absent from the recording process. He only sang on five of the songs and played the guitar on one ("Quocustodiat" was his only full writing credit), leaving Evans and Lilker to do most of the recording alone. Out of Order was poorly received, and during the subsequent tour in 1991 to 1992, there was some line-up shuffling – Connelly moved to vocals only for a time with second guitarist Dave DiPietro joining in 1992. Founding member Lilker departed to concentrate on Brutal Truth and longtime guitarist Bramante followed by the end of the year.

Undaunted, Connolly, Evans and DiPietro recorded Something Wicked for IRS/EMI in 1993 with new bassist Scott Metaxas, the title track featuring in the film Warlock: The Armageddon. Reviews again were somewhat unfavorable, as Nuclear Assault struggled to adapt to a less thrash-friendly music scene. After touring Europe and the US for much of 1993 the band returned with a new line up of Dave Spitz on bass and a returning Bramante, joining Connelly and Evans for more North American touring before slowly coming to a halt in early 1995.The band contributed their take on Die Hard for a Venom tribute album in 1995 before calling it a day.

Nuclear Assault's classic lineup later reunited for one concert in 1997 (put on by Eric Paone of Candy Striper Death Orgy in New Hampshire) then, two more shows the following year with Eric Paone on bass guitar in New England before parting ways a second time.

=== Nuclear Assault in the 21st century (2002–2026) ===
The classic lineup reformed once again in 2002 to perform at the Metal Meltdown and Wacken Open Air festivals and subsequently recorded a live album entitled Alive Again, Bramante leaving for the last time and adding guitarist Eric Burke in time for several European tours, first with Testament and Death Angel, and then with Exodus and Agent Steel, both in 2003. A new studio album entitled Third World Genocide followed in 2005, with yet more touring, including a South American tour with Death Angel, and a headlining European tour. The band released the Louder, Faster, Harder DVD before more US touring in 2006.

From 2007 to 2012, Nuclear Assault occasionally played shows, returning to Japan and South America along with a guest appearance at the Maryland Deathfest and at the Metal Merchants Festival in Oslo, Norway, in January 2011.

In 2013, it was announced that they were working on a new album, which was due for release in 2015. They instead released an EP on June 1, 2015, titled Pounder, which featured "four killer old-school thrash" songs written by Dan Lilker and John Connelly. The band embarked on the "Final Assault" tour to support the EP in 2015 to 2016. By 2022, however, the band had continued to perform live sporadically, mostly in South America as well as both the East Coast and West Coast of the United States.

On November 20, 2022, they announced that they had again broken up. They clarified their statement on November 12, 2026, stating a permanent disbandment and ruled out any possibility for a reunion.

== Band members ==
Official members

- John Connelly – lead vocals, rhythm guitar (1984–1995, 1997-1998, 2001–2008, 2011–2022)
- Dan Lilker – bass, backing vocals (1984–1992, 2001–2008, 2011–2022)
- Scott DuBoys- drums (1984-1985)
- Derek Lord-Drums (1984)
- Glenn Evans – drums (1984–1995, 1997–1998, 2001–2008, 2011–2022)
- Anthony Bramante – lead guitar (1984–1992, 1994-1995, 2001–2002)
- Dave DiPietro – lead guitar (1992–1995)
- Scott Metaxas – bass, backing vocals (1992–1995)
- Erik Burke – lead guitar (2003–2005, 2013–2022)
- Mike Bogush - Lead Guitar ( 1984 - 1985 )

Touring musicians

- Eric Paone – bass (1998)
- Dave "The Beast" Spitz - bass (1994-1995)
- Nick Barker – drums (2017-2018)
- Andrew (Drew) Verstraete – drums (2019–2022)
- Karl Cochran - lead guitar (2003)
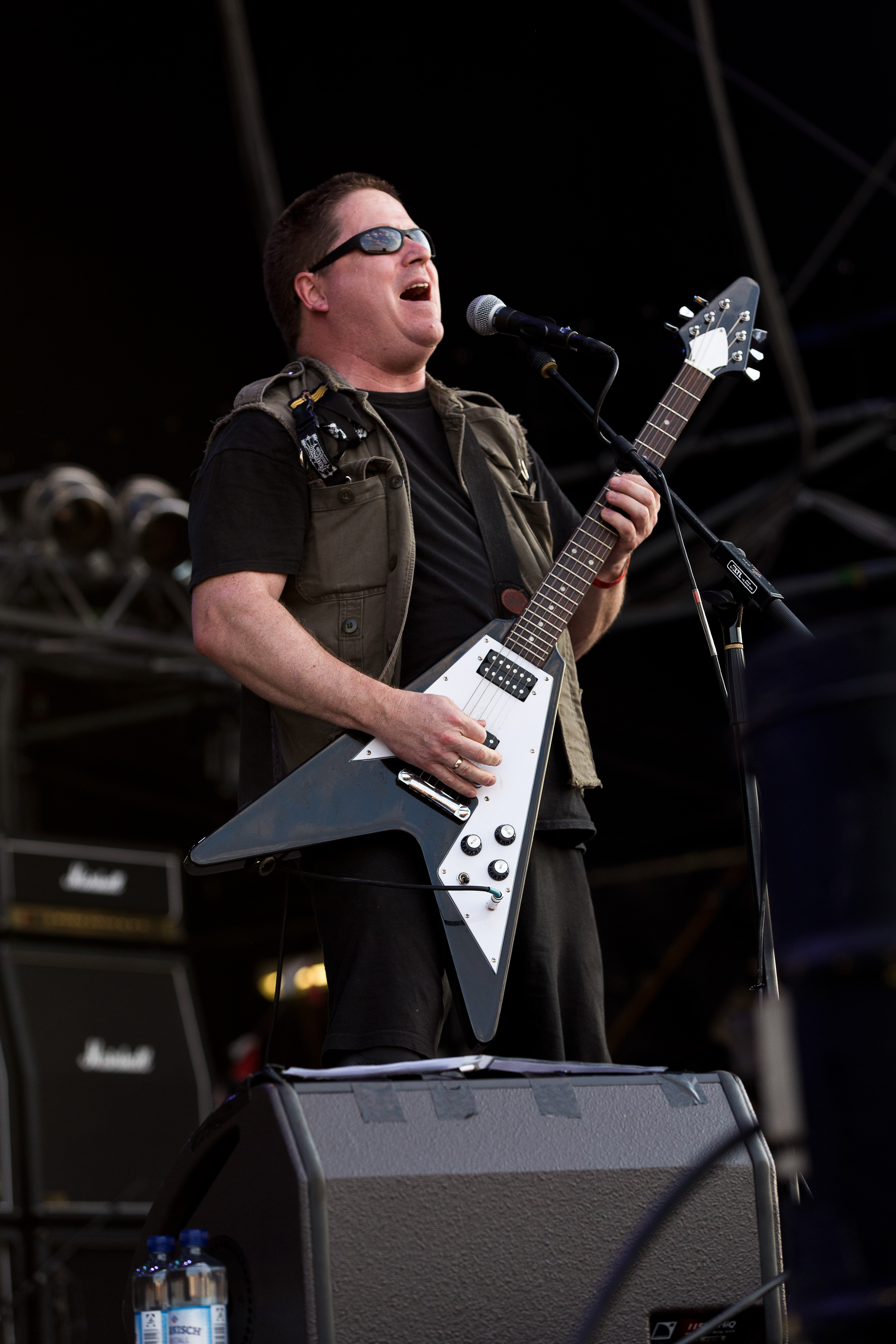
John Connelly

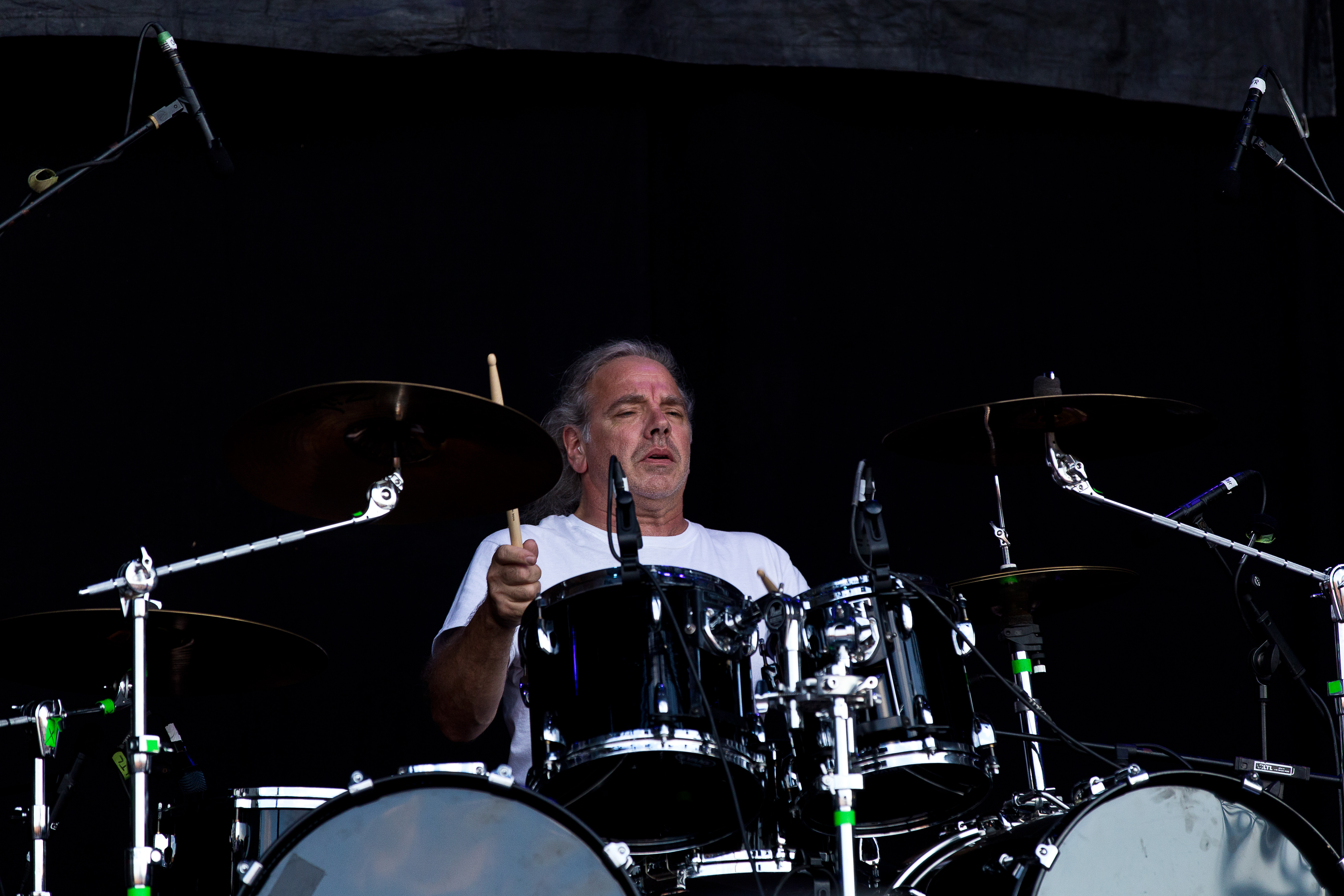
Glenn Evans

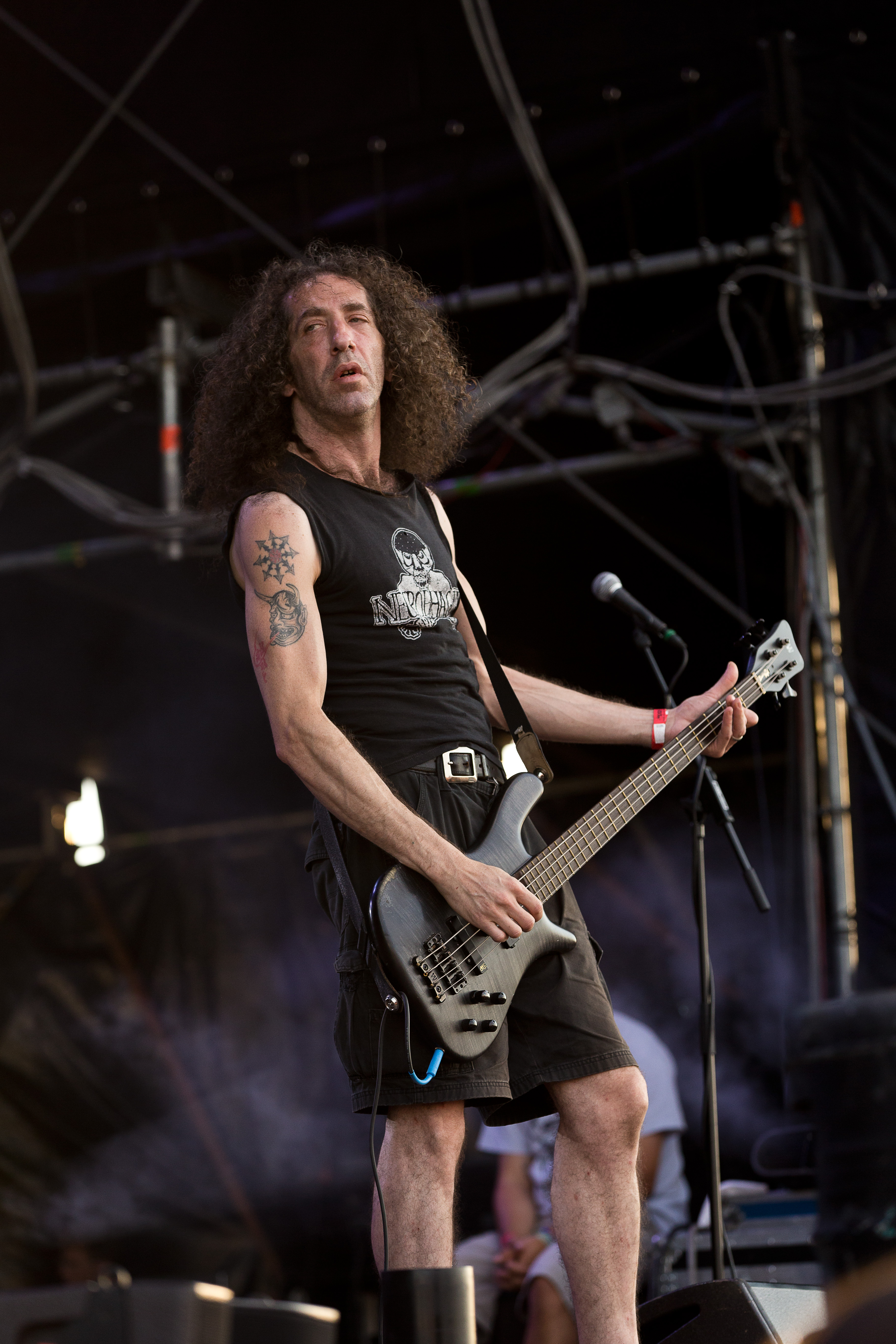
Dan Lilker

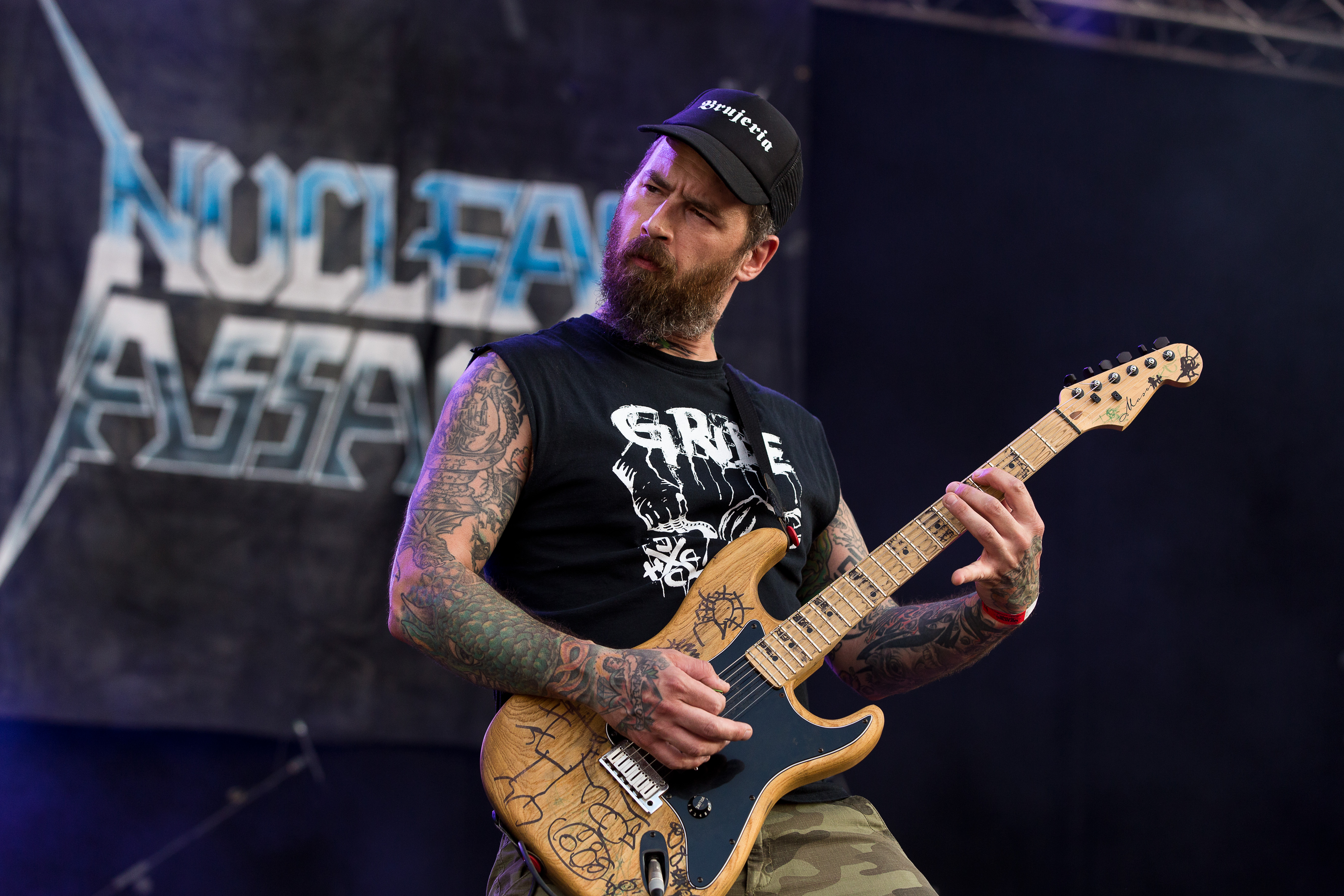
Erik Burke

== Discography ==
=== Studio albums ===
- 1986: Game Over
- 1988: Survive
- 1989: Handle with Care
- 1991: Out of Order
- 1993: Something Wicked
- 2005: Third World Genocide

=== EPs ===
- 1986: Brain Death
- 1987: The Plague
- 1988: Good Times, Bad Times
- 1988: Fight to Be Free
- 2015: Pounder

=== Live albums ===
- 1992: Live at the Hammersmith Odeon
- 2003: Alive Again

=== Compilations ===
- 1997: Assault & Battery

=== Demos ===
- 1984: Nuclear Assault demo
- 1985: Live, Suffer, Die

=== VHS/DVDs ===
- 1988: Radiation Sickness (VHS, re-released on DVD in 2007)
- 1989: Handle With Care European Tour '89 (VHS)
- 2006: Louder Harder Faster DVD

=== Music videos ===
- Brainwashed (1988)
- Critical Mass (1989)
- Trail of Tears (1989)
- Something Wicked (1993)
- Behind Glass Walls (1995) (Never Released)
- Price of Freedom (2005)
- Long Haired Asshole (2005)
