= This Comp Kills Fascists Vol. 1 =

Compilation album by Various Artists
- Released: 2008
- Genre: Grindcore, powerviolence, hardcore punk
- Length: 57:04
- Label: Relapse Records, Deep Six Records (LP)
- Producer: Various

Professional ratings
Review scores
Source	Rating
MetalKult	
Grind and Punishment	

This Comp Kills Fascists Vol. 1 is a compilation album released by Relapse Records focusing on grindcore and powerviolence bands. The LP was released by Deep Six Records. A limited edition box set of 7 7" records was released in January 2009. The album features 14 bands, 51 tracks and has a total running time of 57 minutes and 4 seconds. The album was compiled by Scott Hull of Pig Destroyer/Agoraphobic Nosebleed fame.

Many song titles and lyrics are politically charged (including the album title), mainly speaking against capitalism and fascism, some claiming that America is a fascist country. The CD artwork features a picture of George W. Bush's head with four L-shaped penises coming from his ears, mouth and top of his head that form to resemble a swastika.

== Track listing ==
1. Agents of Satan - "Joe Ryder (Doomryder)"
2. Agents of Satan - "Rape 'em All and let God Sort 'em Out
3. Agents of Satan - "Skrote Skin Mask"
4. Agents of Satan - "Kill for Baloff"
5. Weekend Nachos - "Prioritize"
6. Weekend Nachos - "If You Come Near"
7. Weekend Nachos - "Scars"
8. Weekend Nachos - "Worthless Words"
9. Kill The Client - "False Flag Attack"
10. Kill The Client - "Triple Six Bastard"
11. Kill The Client - "Shithouse Lawyer"
12. Spoonful Of Vicodin - "Totally Brutal News Exposure"
13. Spoonful Of Vicodin - "Designer Track Marks"
14. Spoonful Of Vicodin - "I Don't Lift Weights or Drive an SUV (Because I'm Comfy with My Genitalia)"
15. Spoonful Of Vicodin - "Put That in Your Pipe and Smoke It"
16. Spoonful Of Vicodin - "Our Explanations are Longer than Our Songs"
17. Spoonful Of Vicodin - "Confession Booth Gloryhole"
18. Maruta - "Behind the Steel Curtain"
19. Maruta - "Chemical Tomb"
20. Insect Warfare - "Information Economy"
21. Insect Warfare - "Cellgraft"
22. Insect Warfare - "Disassembler"
23. Insect Warfare - "Cancer of Oppression"
24. Shitstorm - "Paranoid Existence"
25. Shitstorm - "Burning Alive"
26. Shitstorm - "Brainwashed"
27. Shitstorm - "Victim"
28. Shitstorm - "Controlling"
29. Shitstorm - "Mince Meat Human"
30. Man Will Destroy Himself - "Fuse"
31. Man Will Destroy Himself - "Empty"
32. Total Fucking Destruction - "Human is the Bastard"
33. Total Fucking Destruction - "In the Process of Connecting Thinking Errors"
34. Total Fucking Destruction - "Welcome to the Fascist Corporate Wastelands of America Part One"
35. Chainsaw to the Face - "Hating Life"
36. Chainsaw to the Face - "Skewered"
37. Chainsaw to the Face - "Burnt to Death"
38. Chainsaw to the Face - "Ripped in Half"
39. Magrudergrind - "Inevitable Progression"
40. Magrudergrind - "Heavy Bombing"
41. Magrudergrind - "Burden"
42. Brutal Truth - "Forever in a Daze"
43. Brutal Truth - "You Should Know Better"
44. Brutal Truth - "Dogs of War"
45. Brutal Truth - "Turmoil"
46. A.S.R.A - "Chytridiomycosis"
47. A.S.R.A - "Cancer"
48. A.S.R.A - "Pig Squealer"
49. Wasteoid - "Drink in Hand"
50. Wasteoid - "Bangover"
51. Wasteoid - "Hancuffed and Fucked"
