= Extreme Conditions Demand Extreme Responses =

Studio album by Brutal Truth
- Released: September 7, 1992
- Studios: Baby Monster Studios, New York City
- Genres: Deathgrind; grindcore
- Length: 45:04
- Label: Relativity/Earache
- Producer: Colin Richardson

Brutal Truth chronology
Extreme Conditions Demand Extreme Responses (1992)	Need to Control (1994)

Extreme Conditions Demand Extreme Responses is the debut full-length album by American grindcore band Brutal Truth, released on September 7, 1992 by Earache Records.

== Release ==
Music videos were made for "Collateral Damage" (which once held the Guinness World Record for the shortest music video) and "Ill Neglect".

In 2010, Earache issued a limited edition redux version on CD, containing the original album along with 11 bonus tracks from the single Ill Neglect and the Perpetual Conversion EP as well as S.O.B. cover songs and music videos.

== Reception ==
Professional ratings
Review scores
Source	Rating
AllMusic	4/5 stars
Exclaim!	Favourable
Kerrang!	5/5 stars
Metal Hammer	4/5

In March 2009, Terrorizer named the album the number one American grindcore release.

== Track listing ==
All tracks are written by Brutal Truth.

No.	Title	Length
1.	"P.S.P.I."	0:35
2.	"Birth of Ignorance"	3:29
3.	"Stench of Profit"	1:22
4.	"Ill-Neglect"	2:24
5.	"Denial of Existence"	4:25
6.	"Regression/Progression"	2:34
7.	"Collateral Damage"	0:04
8.	"Time"	5:58
9.	"Walking Corpse"	1:40
10.	"Monetary Gain"	3:26
11.	"Wilt"	2:54
12.	"H.O.P.E."	2:03
13.	"Blockhead"	0:07
14.	"Anti-Homophobe"	3:10
15.	"Unjust Compromise" ("Unjust Compromise" consists of the track itself until 5:42 and a hidden track (a short jam of "Sweet Home Alabama" by Lynyrd Skynyrd) that starts at 10:42.)	10:52

Redux edition bonus tracks
No.	Title	Length
1.	"Perpetual Conversion"
2.	"Lord of this World" (Black Sabbath cover)
3.	"Bed Sheet"
4.	"Repeat at Length" (S.O.B. cover)
5.	"Let's Go Summer Beach" (S.O.B. cover)
6.	"Not Me" (S.O.B. cover)
7.	"Spare Change" (S.O.B. cover)
8.	"The Shah Sleeps in Lee Harvey's Grave" (Butthole Surfers cover)
9.	"Hear Nothing for You" (S.O.B. cover)
10.	"Pre-Natal Homeland (Funky Budda Dub)"
11.	"AC/BT"

== Personnel ==
- Kevin Sharp – vocals, power tools
- Brent McCarthy – guitars
- Dan Lilker – bass, vocals, sampling
- Scott Lewis – drums
- Bill Yurkiewicz – guest vocals, noise, animal sounds

=== Production ===
- Colin Richardson – production
- Jim Welch – production
- Digby Pearson – executive production
- Garris Shipon – engineering
- Howie Weinberg – mastering
