= Third World Genocide =

Studio album by Nuclear Assault
- Released: August 30, 2005
- Recorded: August 2003–March 2005
- Genres: Thrash metal, groove metal
- Length: 40:32
- Labels: Screaming Ferret Records; SPV (Europe)
- Producers: Glenn Evans, Tim Koukos

Nuclear Assault chronology
Alive Again (2003)	Third World Genocide (2005)	Pounder (2015)

Professional ratings
Review scores
Source	Rating
AllMusic	3.5/5 stars

Third World Genocide is the sixth and final studio album by Nuclear Assault, released in 2005. It is their first studio album since Something Wicked (1993) and the first to feature original bassist Dan Lilker since Out of Order (1991). Third World Genocide was the last studio album the band had released before their breakup in 2022, though they recorded four new songs for their 2015 EP Pounder.

== Track listing ==
No.	Title	Length
1.	"Third World Genocide"	3:37
2.	"Price of Freedom"	4:10
3.	"Human Wreckage"	2:38
4.	"Living Hell"	5:09
5.	"Whine and Cheese"	2:28
6.	"Defiled Innocence"	4:29
7.	"Exoskeletal"	3:00
8.	"Discharged Reason"	2:14
9.	"Fractured Minds"	3:59
10.	"The Hockey Song"	0:14
11.	"Eroded Liberty"	2:51
12.	"Long Haired Asshole"	2:12
13.	"Glenn's Song"	3:22

== Personnel ==
- Erik Burke - guitar
- Dan Lilker - bass, vocals
- Glenn Evans - drums, producer
- John Connelly - choir, chorus, guitar, vocals
- Matthew Azevedo - mastering
- Rudy DeDoncker - photography
- Tim Koukos - 5-string banjo, engineer, guitar (acoustic), guitar (rhythm), jaw harp, mixing, producer, vocals (background)
- Chris Kozdra (Red Right Hand) - vocals (background on Long Hair Asshole)
- Pete DeMaggio - lead guitar on "Defiled Innocence"
- Kevin Mead - artwork
