= Yellow Machinegun =

Hardcore punk/heavy metal band

- Origin: Osaka, Japan
- Genres: Hardcore punk, heavy metal
- Years active: 1993-2006
- Labels: Bandai Music Entertainment, Howling Bull Entertainment, Rotten Orange
- Past members: Kaori Okumura; Kyoko Moriya; Tamami Tai Kok

Yellow Machinegun was a hardcore punk/heavy metal band formed in 1993 in Osaka, Japan. They produced a demo tape in December 1995. The band released their debut album called Father's Golden Fish on October 21, 1996 for Bandai Music Entertainment. This band has shared the same stage with bands such as Slayer, Motörhead, and Stormtroopers of Death. The band became dormant in June 2006. They did, however, reunite in Tokyo to play a show with the vocalist's new band, SuziSuzi, in April 2017.

== Personnel ==
- Kaori Okumura (vocals, bass)
- Kyoko Moriya (guitar)
- Tamami Tai Kok (drums)

== Discography ==
=== Studio albums ===
- Father's Golden Fish (10/21/96)
- Spot Remover (8/5/98)
- Build & Destroy (9/5/99)
- Bean Ball (12/27/01)
- Yellow Bucket (12/26/02)

=== Compilation ===
- SPEAK JAPANESE OR XXX (11/27/00)
- Rotten Speed Hell (4/7/01)
- CROSS-THE STREET (12/16/04)

=== Split ===
- ヌンチャクvsイエローマシンガン Split with Nunchaku
- Seasoning The Obese Split with Stormtroopers of Death 1999
- Split (Yellow Machinegun/Abnormals) Split with Abnormals 2000

=== DVD Split ===
- ロッテンオレンジのドーン
