= Need to Control =

Studio album by Brutal Truth
- Released: October 25, 1994
- Recorded: March 1994
- Studios: Baby Monster, New York; Platinum Island, New York
- Genres: Deathgrind; grindcore; experimental metal
- Length: 43:04
- Label: Earache

Brutal Truth chronology
Extreme Conditions Demand Extreme Responses (1992)	Need to Control (1994)	Kill Trend Suicide (1996)

Professional ratings
Review scores
Source	Rating
AllMusic	4.5/5 stars
Global Domination	9/10
Under the Volcano	Favorable

Need to Control is the second studio album by American grindcore band Brutal Truth, released on October 25, 1994 by Earache Records.

== Background ==
Need to Control is the first album to feature drummer Richard Hoak, who would remain in this position until the band officially disbanded in 2014. Scott Lewis, who played drums on predecessor album Extreme Conditions Demand Extreme Responses, had left before the recording of Need to Control. According to vocalist Kevin Sharp, one reason for the drummer's departing was that "Scott just really didn't like the touring thing."

Sharp cited his personal background in the punk movement as inspiration for recording the Germs's song "Media Blitz": "I always really liked the whole Germs concept. [...] It was like 'We can't really play our instruments but we want to be in a band and we're gonna compensate by being creative. [...] I was always inspired by that mentality, that punk mentality, and that's where I come from. So that's why I like the Germs and that's why we did that song." Mike Williams, singer of American sludge metal band Eyehategod and a friend of Sharp, contributed vocals to the cover version: "Mike was in town when we recorded Need to Control."

== Release ==
Need to Control was released on CD, cassette, and LP. A box set was also released, containing 5 records: one 5", one 6", one 7", one 8", and one 9". This box set, as well as the Japanese CD, contains four bonus tracks. On September 14, 2010 Earache released a redux edition of Need to Control, which included the bonus tracks from the Japanese release (except "B.T.I.T.B.") plus two more, along with an interview with vocalist Kevin Sharp.

== Reception ==
Ian Christe in his review for Metal Maniacs in June 1995 wrote, "Brutal Truth's harsh spastic second record is all coarse and ferocious spitting rage with eyes rolled back in head..an icy, pissed new kind of power music that breaks up all earlier ideas of heavy... Slow distorted lurching and piercing noises are frantically arranged, then totally blown out. Minimal radical lyrics stick an unwavering middle finger in the face of fascists and their fans. This whole freak event is real and raw, a classic cataclysmic ruckus of intense noise, ability, and wildness."

== Track listing ==
All tracks are written by Brutal Truth, except where noted.

No.	Title	Length
1.	"Collapse"	5:03
2.	"Black Door Mine"	1:42
3.	"Turn Face"	1:29
4.	"Godplayer"	4:07
5.	"I See Red"	2:50
6.	"Ironlung"	4:22
7.	"Bite the Hand"	2:06
8.	"Ordinary Madness"	5:05
9.	"Media Blitz" (Germs cover, written and composed by Darby Crash and Pat Smear)	0:56
10.	"Judgement"	2:34
11.	"Brain Trust"	2:43
12.	"Choice of a New Generation"	1:59
13.	"Mainliner"	2:19
14.	"Displacement"	4:15
15.	"Crawlspace"	1:35

Box Set/Japanese CD bonus tracks
No.	Title	Length
16.	"Wish You Were Here.... Wish You'd Go Away" (Pink Floyd cover, lyrics by Roger Waters, music by Waters and David Gilmour)	4:58
17.	"Painted Clowns"	2:51
18.	"Dethroned Emperor" (Celtic Frost cover, written and composed by Celtic Frost)	5:01
19.	"B.T.I.T.B."

Redux Edition
No.	Title	Length
16.	"Wish You Were Here.... Wish You'd Go Away" (Pink Floyd cover, lyrics by Roger Waters, music by Waters and David Gilmour)	4:58
17.	"Painted Clowns"	2:51
18.	"Dethroned Emperor" (Celtic Frost cover, written and composed by Celtic Frost)	5:01
19.	"Eggshells"	3:09
20.	"Head Cheese"	2:13

== Personnel ==
=== Brutal Truth ===
- Dan Lilker – bass guitar
- Richard Hoak – drums
- Brent McCarthy – guitar
- Kevin Sharp – vocals

=== Additional musicians ===
- Mike Williams – vocals (9)
- Bill Yurkiewicz – vocals (2)
- Andy Haas – didgeridoo (4)

=== Technical personnel ===
- Steve McAllister – recording
- Colin Richardson – mixing
- Zmago Smon – engineering
- Dave Buchanan – assistant engineering
- Stephen Marcussen – mastering
- Patrick Aquintey – art direction
- Louis Gozik – cover art
- Eddie Bartolomei – photography
