= Robert Piotrowicz =

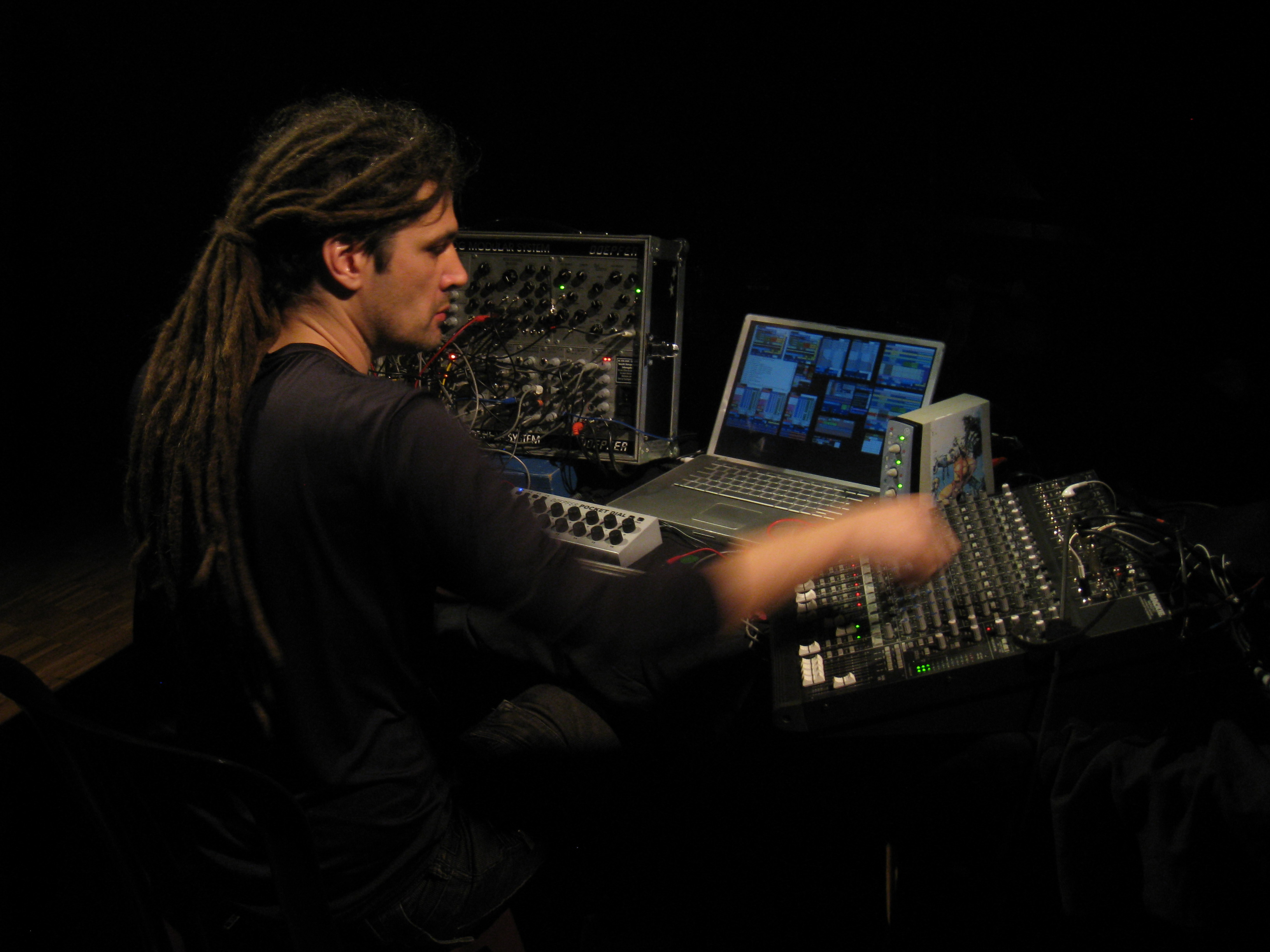
Robert Piotrowicz performing at Lausanne Underground Film and Music Festival 2010

Robert Piotrowicz (born 1973) is a Polish sound artist, composer, and improviser. Together with Anna Zaradny he runs Musica Genera label and annual festival of the same name.

He works within contemporary electroacoustic music field. Piotrowicz is an instrumentalist whose main tools are modular synthesizer and guitar.

== Career ==
Robert Piotrowicz has been working with Anna Zaradny also Burkhard Stangl, Valerio Tricoli. Other collaborators in recent years included Oren Ambarchi, Jerome Noetinger, Martin Klapper, Xavier Charles, Lasse Marhaug, John Hegre, Tony Buck, Kevin Drumm, and others.

Piotrowicz participated in such music events and festivals, including "In Between" Chicago 2001, Jazz in E. in Germany, Copenhagen Jazz Festiwal 2001, Audio Art Festival 2000/2004/2010, Muzyka z Mozgu 2000, Artgenda 2002, Horbar Festival Hamburg 2002, ALTF4, SKIFF, NPAI Pathenay, AuxPole'n, Densities 2005/2009, Ultra Hang 2007, Hapzura 2007 Club Transmediale 2008, Stimul 08, What Is Music 2009, All Ears 2010, Lausanne Underground Film and Music Festival 2010 and others.

Among his interdisciplinary projects are "Zmartwychwstanie", "Homage", TOJTOJ, "Summe von Nullen", "Definition". He composed music for theatre plays "Lastade" Lasztownia 2008. Four pictures in Space, "Smierc czlowieka wiewiórki", "Bóg/ Honor/Ojczyzna: Katarzyna Medycejska".

== Poetry, literature projects ==
- "Herbert: Reconstrukcja Poety" dir. M. Liber. Teatr usta usta/2xu. Warsaw 2008
- "Hra na Ohradu"(dir. L. Jiricka, text . Stanislav Dvorský, Prague 2008)
- "Pan Cogito"(Zbigniew Herbert, Bucuresti 2009, 2 cd audiobook)
- "RANCIO" (dir. L. Jiricka text. Emil Cioran, Prague 2010, radio play)

== Discography ==
- Robert Piotrowicz - Rurokura meets Jelito mini cdr (polycephal)
- Robert Piotrowicz / Burkhard Stangl / Anna Zaradny - Can't Illumination cd (musica genera)
- Robert Piotrowicz - The Path To The Death cdr (phase!)
- Robert Piotrowicz - Rurokura and Final Warn cd (emd.pl/records)
- Robert Piotrowicz / Xavier Charles - /// cd (emd.pl/records)
- Robert Piotrowicz - Lasting Clinamen cd (musica genera)
- Robert Piotrowicz – Rurokura and Eastern European Folk Music Research vol.2 7" (bocianrecords)
- Robert Piotrowicz / Carl Michael von Hausswolff – split LP (bocianrecords)
- Kevin Drumm / Jerome Noetinger / Robert Piotrowicz – Wrestling 7" (bocianrecords)
- Robert Piotrowicz / C. Spencer Yeh – AMBIENT – onde sided LP (bocianrecords)
- Robert Piotrowicz - When Snakeboy Is Dying - LP (musica genera)
- Robert Piotrowicz - Lincoln Sea - LP (musica genera)
