= John Connelly (musician) =

American guitarist and singer

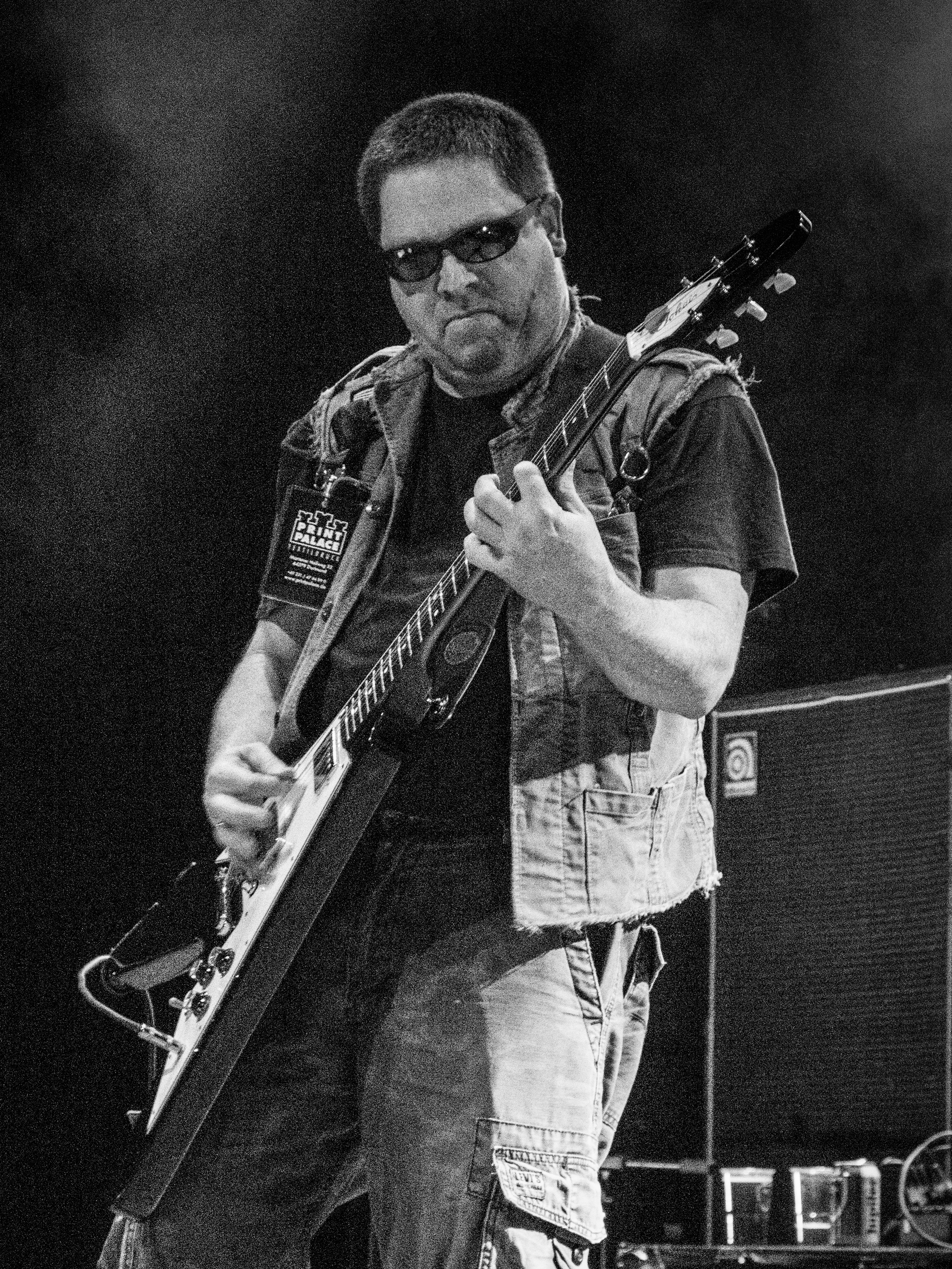
- John Conelly live with Nuclear Assault at Eindhoven Metal Meeting, 2015

Background information
- Born: July 28, 1962 (age 63); New York City, U.S.
- Genres: Heavy metal; thrash metal; crossover thrash
- Occupation: Musician
- Instruments: Vocals; guitar
- Years active: 1981−present
- Website: nuclearassault.us

John Connelly (born July 28, 1962) is an American musician, best known as the lead vocalist and guitarist of New York City thrash metal band Nuclear Assault.

== Biography ==
Connelly started as a roadie for thrash metal band Anthrax where he became a close friend of Anthrax bassist Danny Lilker. He formed the band Nuclear Assault in 1983, and Lilker, having left Anthrax, joined him soon after.

In 1986, Connelly was a guest vocalist on Immaculate Deception, the first album by New York hardcore band Ludichrist and again on a track called "Goodbye Freedom, Hello Mom" from the 1990 Scatterbrain album Here Comes Trouble.

Around 1991, Connelly saw fit to take a break from Nuclear Assault, and released a low profile solo record under the name John Connelly Theory, entitled Back to Basics. The differences between his solo project and Nuclear Assault was mostly found in the more rock oriented song structures and occasional humor..

=== Nuclear Theory 1996–1997 ===
John found himself in New London, Connecticut, at this time after the release and tour supporting Nuclear's album Something Wicked. He formed a new solo project combining the names of his previous solo project and Nuclear Assault, with the premise being that the band would concentrate on work from both as well as work on new material. Area musicians Patrick Vitagliano, lead guitar, Tony O'Brien, bass and Tom Maynard drummer from Senslis Killin' were recruited to perform gigs and support new material. The direction for the new material was heavy guitar oriented music combining elements of punk, thrash, and speed metal with some blues thrown in occasionally. The setlist typically contained the songs "L. H. A", "Aggressive", "7/8 Solution" from "John Connelly Theory" and "Another Violent End", "Behind Glass Walls" and "Hang The Pope" from Nuclear Assault's catalog. In September 1997, Patrick left to concentrate on his sound and lighting company. Tom Maynard recruited another local musician, Chris Boix to take over lead guitar duties. Nuclear Theory opened for Brutal Truth in December 1996, with Dan Lilker joining in for "Hang the Pope". About this time the band relocated to Pawcatuck, CT. On May 14, 1997, John reunited with Glenn Evans, Dan Lilker and Anthony Bramante for one Nuclear Assault show at the Colosseum in Manchester, NH. Also in early 1997, Nuclear Theory played at the Living Room in Providence, RI. Both of these shows were made possible with the help of Eric Paone of Candy Striper Death Orgy. This was the last gig for the band Nuclear Theory. Soon afterward Tom and Chris lost interest in the band due to lack of direction and each decided to devote more time to their new families.

=== Rite Bastards 2000–2002 ===
He formed a 3-piece line-up called Rite Bastards. The line up consisted of John on guitar and lead vocals. Bass player Tony O'Brian sang back up vocals and Tom Maynard played drums. Tom left the band and was replaced by Jim Villano. During this time they recorded a demo CD with songs titled, "Carmen", "Oh Why", "Other Man's Song" and 3 others. They played in Boston at a club with Overkill. John had played a reunion show with Nuclear Assault and when he came back to Rite Bastards he asked the band if they would like to form a reformed version of Nuclear Assault. Tony and Jim declined. Shortly after this John reformed Nuclear Assault.

=== Nuclear Assault III 2002–2022 ===
In early 2002 the band was approached by a mutual friend to reform for a couple of shows. Their first reunion show was the Metal Meltdown in April and there they found out that there was a demand for the band to continue. They played the classic NYC venue CBGB in May along with a show in Massachusetts that was recorded for a live album to be released on Screaming Ferret Wreckords in early 2003. After a well-received performance at the Wacken Open Air festival in Germany in August, original guitarist Anthony Bramante left the band due to commitments at home and was replaced by Erik Burke. In September 2002 the band returned to São Paulo, Brazil, where they had played back in 1989 with the then fledgling Sepultura opening.

The band released a live album Alive Again in 2003, and a studio album Third World Genocide in 2005. Lyrical themes on that album include broad criticisms of holy war, and the song "Price of Freedom" is specifically about the response of the United States after September 11, 2001. Nuclear Assault remained active sporadically before the band broke up once again in 2022.

=== Municipal Waste 2012 ===
In 2012 Municipal Waste released a track called 'The Fatal Feast'. It features John Connelly on guest vocals. He can be heard singing the chorus.
