= Fucked Up discography =

Discography of Canadian punk band Fucked Up

The discography of Canadian hardcore punk band Fucked Up comprises multiple studio albums, live recordings, extended plays, singles, compilations, mixtapes, and the long-running Zodiac series of 12-inch releases. The band’s discography spans studio albums, live recordings, and an extensive number of standalone singles and split releases, many of which have been issued in limited quantities.

== Studio albums ==
- Hidden World (2006)
- The Chemistry of Common Life (2008)
- David Comes to Life (2011)
- Glass Boys (2014)
- Dose Your Dreams (2018)
- One Day (2023)
- Who's Got the Time & a Half? (2024)
- Another Day (2024)
- Someday (2024)

== Zodiac series ==
- 2006 Year of the Dog (Blocks Recording Club)
- 2008 Year of the Pig (Vice Records, What's Your Rupture?, Matador Records)
- 2009 Year of the Rat (What's Your Rupture?)
- 2010 Year of the Ox (Merge Records + Matador Europe)
- 2012 Year of the Tiger (Matador Records)
- 2014 Year of the Dragon (Tankcrimes)
- 2015 Year of the Hare (Deathwish Inc.)
- 2017 Year of the Snake (Tankcrimes)
- 2021 Year of the Horse (Tankcrimes)
- 2025 Grass Can Move Stones Part 1: Year of the Goat (Tankcrimes)
- 2026 Grass Can Move Stones Part 2: Year of the Monkey (Tankcrimes)

== Singles, EPs, demos, splits ==
- 2001 Demo 2001 cassette tape (Breakout Fanzine)
- 2002 Demo cassette tape (self-released) + 7-inch (2022 reissue by Get Better Records)
- 2002 No Pasaran 7-inch (Deranged Records)
- 2003 Police 7-inch (Deranged Records)
- 2003 Baiting the Public 7-inch (Deranged Records)
- 2003 Dance of Death 7-inch (Deranged Records)
- 2003 Epics in Minutes 7-inch (self-released)
- 2003 Epics in Minutes 7-inch (fake version, self-released) (Baiting the Public 7-inch with incorrect labels)
- 2004 Litany 7-inch EP (Test Pattern Records + 2006 repress on Havoc)
- 2004 Split with Haymaker 7-inch (Deep Six Records)
- 2005 Dangerous Fumes 7-inch (fake version, self-released) (Baiting the Public 7-inch with incorrect labels and a fake sleeve)
- 2005 Generation 7-inch (Slasher Records)
- 2005 Black Cross 7-inch (Burning Sensation)
- 2005 Black Army 7-inch (Burning Sensation)
- 2006 Triumph of Life 7-inch (Peter Bower Records / Vice Records UK) + CD (Go Down Fighting Records / Vice Records UK)
- 2006 Dangerous Fumes 7-inch (Deranged Records / Hate Records)
- 2006 Split with Think I Care 7-inch (Town of Hardcore)
- 2006 Dolly Mixture 7-inch (Fucked Up Records) (Two covers of Dolly Mixture)
- 2006 Shop Assistants 7-inch (Fucked Up Records) (Two covers of The Shop Assistants)
- 2006 Humos Peligrosos 7-inch (La Vida Es Un Mus) (Dangerous Fumes 7-inch with a different cover)
- 2006 Fums Perillosos 7-inch (La Vida Es Un Mus) (Dangerous Fumes 7-inch with a different cover)
- 2006 Hoxton Cunts 7-inch ("Random 7-inch's that have fake covers and labels on it done to make fun of the band and Vice Records.")
- 2006 Two Snakes 7-inch (Fucked Up Records + 2009 re-press on HG Fact, and further regional variations for Greece and Germany)
- 2007 Toronto FC 7-inch Split with Hard Skin (No Future)
- 2007 David Christmas 7-inch (Hidden World Records)
- 2008 Year of the Pig American Edit 7-inch (Matador Records / What's Your Rupture)
- 2008 Year of the Pig UK Edit 7-inch (Matador Records / What's Your Rupture)
- 2008 Year of the Pig Japanese Edit 7-inch (Matador Records / What's Your Rupture)
- 2008 Crooked Head 7-inch (Matador Records)
- 2008 Royal Swan 7-inch split with Katie Stelmanis 7-inch (Matador Records)
- 2009 No Epiphany 7-inch (Matador Records)
- 2009 Neat Parts digital single (Matador Records)
- 2009 Do They Know It's Christmas? digital single (Matador Records)
- 2009 Son of Sam on Shred Yr Face Vol. 2 7-inch Split with Rolo Tomassi and The Bronx (Matador Records)
- 2010 Couple Tracks 7-inch (Matador Records)
- 2010 @WFMU 10-inch (recorded in 2007) (Altamont)
- 2010 Daytrotter Sessions 7-inch (two-song bootleg)
- 2010 Daytrotter Sessions 7-inch (three-song official release for Record Store Day) (Matador Records)
- 2010 Here Lies Are split with Serena Maneesh 12-inch (Best of Both Records)
- 2010 Live On CBC Radio 3 May/6/2008 digital single (Free Music Archive)
- 2011 A Little Death digital single (Matador Records)
- 2011 Ship Of Fools digital single (Matador Records)
- 2011 Queen Of Hearts digital single, promo CD (Matador Records)
- 2011 The Other Shoe UK tour 7-inch (Fucked Up Records) + digital single (Matador Records)
- 2011 Byrdesdale Garden City 7-inch (Matador Records)
- 2011 Do All Words Can Do 7-inch (Matador Records)
- 2011 Remember Me (That's All I Ask) 7-inch (Matador Records)
- 2011 Octavio Made The Bomb 7-inch (Matador Records)
- 2011 Full Ripe split 7-inch (bootleg) (really a fake with no connection to the band)
- 2011 Jingle Bells benefit 7-inch split with Sloan (Fucked Up Records)
- 2012 Clap, Clap, Clap from Rated G.G. compilation 7-inch (WFMU)
- 2012 I Hate Summer (Live) 7-inch split with The Dirtbombs (Bruise Cruise Records)
- 2012 What Would You Do (For Veronica)? 7-inch split with Yamantaka/Sonic Titan (Polaris)
- 2014 Paper the House 7-inch (Matador Records)
- 2014 Sun Glass 7-inch (Matador Records)
- 2014 Blink 7-inch (Fucked Up Records)
- 2018 Raise Your Voice Joyce 7-inch (Merge Records/Arts & Crafts)
- 2019 Fading Eyes 7-inch (Fucked Up Records)
- 2022 Getting Slightly flexi-disc (Fucked Up Records)
- 2023 Cops 7-inch (Fucked Up Records)
- 2023 Electroshock (with The Halluci Nation) digital single (Fucked Up Records)
- 2023 John Wayne Was A Nazi (with The Halluci Nation) digital single (Fucked Up Records)
- 2023 Being Annoying 7-inch (Fucked Up Records)
- 2023 Show Friends/Spot The Difference/What The Sun Saw 7-inch (Fucked Up Records)
- 2024 44th & Vanderbilt digital single (Matador)
- 2025 Disabuse 7-inch (Sub Pop)

== Other 12-inches ==
- 2004 Let Likes be Cured by Likes 12-inch (Schizophrenic Records)
- 2004 Looking for Gold 12-inch (Fucked Up Records)
- 2005 Generation 12-inch (Slasher Records)
- 2005 Litany + 1 12-inch (Test Pattern)
- 2006 Since U Been Gone 10-inch/12" (bootleg)
- 2009 Bruises - Live in Muenster Germany 12-inch (Slowboy Records)
- 2013 21st Century Cling-Ons on Sugar Daddy Live Split Series Vol. 8 split 12-inch with the Melvins (Amphetamine Reptile Records)
- 2016 This Mother Forever 12-inch (Fucked Up Records)
- 2022 Oberon (Fucked Up Records)

== Live albums ==
- 2008 2007 Halloween Weekend DVD
- 2010 Reel Live (Welfare Records) (Recorded live at Toronto Opera House, 2010. Reel-to-reel tape released in an edition of 75)
- 2011 Coke Sucks, Drink Pepsi (Chunklet Magazine) (Recorded live at The Earl, Atlanta GA in 2010, LP and download)
- 2020 Rivoli (Recorded live at The Rivoli Club in Toronto in 2014. Download released 2020, vinyl released 2023)
- 2017 Live at Third Man Records (Recorded live to acetate at Third Man Records during the fabled 9-piece-band "Zodiac Tour" in the summer of 2015. LP released 2017, download released 2021)
- 2020 Live at CBGB's (Recorded live at CBGB's in New York in 2006. Download only.)
- 2022 David Comes to LIVE (Recorded live in Warsaw, Brooklyn, NYC November 15, 2011. Download only.)
- 2024 Windsor (Recorded live at The Meteor in Windsor, Ontario, July 15, 2024. Download only.)

== Collaborations ==
- 2011 David's Town LP (Matador Records)
- 2018 Raise Your Voice Joyce (Contemporary Shouts From Contemporary Voices) LP

== Compilations and mixtapes ==
- 2004 Epics in Minutes CD (Deranged Records + 2022 reissue by Get Better Records)
- 2005 Mixtape Volume One cassette tape (Hidden World/Deranged Records)
- 2006 Fucked Up Tape cassette tape (Harsh Brutal Cold Productions + 2007 reissue by Trujaca Fala)
- 2006 Mixtape Volume II cassette tape (Deranged Records)
- 2009 Mixtape No. 3 cassette tape (self-released)
- 2009 Singles Compilation cassette tape (Trujaca Fala)
- 2009 Singles Compilation CD (HG Fact)
- 2010 Couple Tracks: Singles 2002-2009 CD (Matador Records)
- 2011 Mixtape No. 4 cassette tape (self-released)
- 2014 Mixtape No. 5 cassette tape (self-released)
- 2020 Mixtape No. 6 download (self-released)
- 2023 Mixtape No. 7 download (self-released)
- 2022 Do All Words Can Do LP (Matador Records)

== Soundtrack album ==
- 2016 Zanzibar (recorded in 2011) (Fucked Up Records)

== Compilation appearances ==
- 2003 Generation/Last Man Standing from Toronto City Omnibus 12-inch (Schizophrenic Records)
- 2003 88 from Town of Hardcore CD (Town of Hardcore fanzine)
- 2005 Dropout from Generations: A Hardcore Compilation CD (Revelation Records)
- 2005 Search For The Words / Dance Of Death (Original Rough Mix) from Pink Eye Club Chi-Town Get Down CDR (self-released)
- 2006 Try a Little Togetherness from Killed by Canada CD (Fans Of Bad Productions)
- 2008 Baiting the Public (Recorded Live in The Pit at KFJC, Los Altos Hills, CA.) from Live At The Devil's Triangle Vol 11 CD (KFJC)
- 2008 Job from Killed by Trash 2 LP (P. Trash Records)
- 2010 Lazer Attack from Untitled 21: A Juvenile Tribute to the Swingin' Utters CD (Red Scare Industries)
- 2010 Baiting the Public (Recorded Live On KBOO 90.7 FM PDX) from Mixed Combat Vol.1 cassette tape (Life During Wartime)
- 2013 Walking on (Crooked) Sunshine from BrooklynVegan Presents Sun Salute CD (Primary Wave)
- 2014 Voce Rubata from Broadsheet Music: A Year In Review (A Jonah Falco solo effort released under the Fucked Up moniker) CD (Arts & Crafts)
- 2016 Cream Puff War from Day of the Dead CD/LP (4AD)
- 2024 The Refused Party Program from The Shape Of Punk To Come (Obliterated Edition) tribute album LP (Epitaph Records)

== Notes ==
- (Note: Hotel California from the 2010 Metal Hard Rock Covers 353 CD is credited to Fucked Up, but is by a different band entirely unrelated to this one.)
