= Vice Canada Reports =

Vice Canada Reports is a Canadian web and television series, produced and distributed by Vice Media through the website of Vice Magazine in 2015 and 2016. The series consists of documentary news reports, which were distributed through the website until the launch of the Viceland television channel's Canadian version in 2016 formally known as "CANADIANA" and "Vice Canada".

The series is a two-time winner of the Canadian Screen Award for Best Original Program or Series Produced for Digital Media, Non-Fiction, winning at the 4th Canadian Screen Awards in 2016 and at the 5th Canadian Screen Awards in 2017.

== Notable Documentaries ==
Overdose Crisis on the US-Canada Border: Steel Town Down (2018) - Tens of thousands have died of opioid overdoses across the US and Canada in 2017, with the death count surpassing the peak of the AIDS epidemic. The weight of the crisis in Sault Ste. Marie, Ontario falls on a handful of people struggling to keep their fellow community members alive, similar to countless towns in North America. Steel Town Down is an intimate portrait of the only harm reduction worker in town and a family desperate to save their son from becoming another victim of the crisis.

The Anarchist Commune in the Rainforest: Poole's Land (2018) - We travels to Poole's Land, an anarchist commune on the western edge of Canada to figure out what exactly is drawing young people to live on the periphery of society. She ventures into the rainforest and confronts a variety of her deepest fears, but ultimately finds enlightenment in the spirit of the people who inhabit this mysterious place.

The Soldiers of Odin: Inside Canada's Extremist Vigilante Group (2017) (In association with Vice News) - We investigates the Soldiers of Odin and their declared commitment to preserving Canadian values. Amid rising Islamophobia and violence in Canada, reporter Ben Makuch explores the blurry line between nationalist pride and racist rhetoric.

Fentanyl: The Drug Deadlier Than Heroin (2016) - An immersive and personal feature film about the fentanyl crisis in Canada told from the perspective of a community of drug users.

How To Buy a Gun In Canada: Armed and Reasonable (2016) - No one thinks of Canada as a nation of gun nuts, but collectively, Canadians own over 10 million guns and this number keeps growing. Canada has been ranked 6th best country overall for gun owners by Guns & Ammo Magazine. There's a new type of gun owner emerging—20 years ago you needed to know someone with guns to be introduced to them, but today, young people are discovering guns online. This new generation of young gun enthusiasts is often simultaneously pro-gun rights and pro-gun control, almost fanatical about following gun safety laws. They're making shooting a fast-growing extreme sport. Despite somewhat high gun ownership and liberal laws, Canada's gun violence is still remarkably low. What is it about Canada's gun culture and laws that separates it from the US? We talks to gun legislators and enthusiasts in Canada and the US to find out.

Probing the Existence of an Alleged Toronto Gang with Rob Ford Ties (2016) - We look into the Dixon City Bloods - an allegedly notorious gang that sprung up into Canada's consciousness during the Rob Ford crack scandal to see if the gang was a media fabrication, a violent menace, or something in between.

Toronto's Cannabis Candyland (2016) (In association with Canadian Cannabis and guest host Damian Abraham of Fucked Up) - Toronto is in the middle of a grey market, marijuana dispensary boom. Since Canada's Prime Minister Justin Trudeau was elected in 2015, weed entrepreneurs have been illegally opening up shop all over the city. Even though there's no guarantee that Trudeau's plan for legal marijuana will include storefront businesses, these operations are opening almost daily. Not only do these shops sell weed, more and more customers are coming through the doors of their local dispensary looking for marijuana edibles. While these stores insist they're providing a medical need to cannabis patients, can a weed soda or a chronic cookie really be considered medicinal? We host and medical marijuana patient Damian Abraham does the tough job of trying to figure that out.

The Dark Grey Market: Canadian Cannabis (2015) (In association with Canadian Cannabis and guest host Damian Abraham of Fucked Up) - Cannabis in Canada is still widely illegal. With a new government entering parliament in 2016, the odds of legalization, further criminalization or decriminalization of marijuana coming to fruition are still to be determined. But despite that, black market growers and grey market marijuana dispensaries are more prevalent than ever. And the sometimes dangerous, and legally dubious process of manufacturing cannabis oil and other concentrates is rising with growers investing tens of thousands of dollars to make sheets of potent hash oil. With the legal fate of weed still in the balance, guest host Damian Abraham went to British Columbia, the Wild West of Canadian chronic, visited grows operating illegally or semi-legally, met concentrate manufacturers making large quantities of oil in spite of the law, and checked in on the exploding dispensary scene that the federal Conservative government is trying to shut down.

The Cash Crop: Canadian Cannabis (2015) (In association with Canadian Cannabis and guest host Damian Abraham of Fucked Up) - In the latest episode of our Canadian Cannabis series, we take a look at how Canada is missing out on an economic windfall by continuing down a path of restrictive marijuana policies. Fucked Up's Damian Abraham, a medical marijuana user and overall weed enthusiast, went out to Vancouver and Denver to compare the grey market of dispensaries in British Columbia (which are now in the crosshairs of the federal government) to Denver's regulated legal weed economy. He meets with weed entrepreneurs in both cities and chats with the decision makers who are trying to make pot easy to get on both sides of the border.

Canada's Waterless Communities: Shoal Lake 40 (2015) - Canada has the world's second-largest supply of fresh water, but 169 First Nation communities have limited or no access to it. Nearly a quarter of the First Nations communities administered by Health Canada are currently without clean water. The alerts issued by the federal government range from "boil water advisories" going back more than 20 years to crippling "Do Not Consume" orders. We go to Shoal Lake 40, a reserve only a few hours from Winnipeg that sits on a manmade island. The lake the reserve sits on supplies Winnipeg's drinking water, but Shoal Lake 40 has been under a boil water advisory for 17 years. In part two, we go to Neskantaga, a remote fly-in where the federal government opts to deliver rations of bottled water to rather than repair the treatment plant that would provide jobs and consistent water. VICE Canada Reports meets with the chiefs, the political negotiators and the young residents who have spent their whole lives without accessible clean water.

Searchers: Highway of Tears (2015) - You can't help but shudder at the sinister nickname for British Columbia’s Provincial AutoRoute 16, known as “The Highway of Tears,” which is both a trucking passage and the winding graveyard of up to 42 aboriginal women—most of which assumed murdered by a series of active serial killers. In fact, the RCMP, Canada's famous Mounties and the chief police force investigating the murders—believes there are active serial killers currently operating along the highway. The RCMP puts the official number of women who have been murdered along the highway at 18. Running west to east through some of the most remote terrain in North America, passing by desolate First Nations reserves and logging towns, the highway has become synonymous with the endemic violence towards Native women in Canada: They're five times more likely than any other ethnicity in the country to be raped or murdered. It really wasn't until a white tree planter was murdered and discovered on the highway in 2002, that the RCMP finally launched a full-scale investigation. The taskforce, called EPANA, has had its funding cut several times in the last few years and no one is sure what they are doing now. Ray Michalko, a former RCMP detective who quit the force, is now one of the only men on the job as a private investigator. He works directly with the families of missing or murdered indigenous women on his own dime. He takes VICE Canada Reports on a tour of, basically, Canada's Valley of Death and connects us with the families who have turned to him after sometimes decades of stalled police investigations.

The YouTube Star Who Kills Animals For Fur (2015) (In association with Vice International) - For nearly 250 years, the Canada's fur trade was a thriving industry that played a major role in the creation of the country. After decades of suffering from an anti-fur image problem, Canada's fur trade has found a new market: Thanks to China's booming middle class and Russia's luxury-starved oligarchy, the industry that founded the nation is on a comeback. In the first episode of our new series CANADIANA, we went to the Northwest Territories to meet a modern-day fur trapper—Andrew Stanley, the Metis YouTube star who's become the unlikely ambassador of Canada's trapping world. We visit Andrew's remote cabin in the northern wilderness to go full tilt into the Canadian trap life—trapping beavers, skinning an otter, and learning the best way to deal with two frozen 160-pound wolves infected with mange.

Prohibition in Northern Canada (2015) (In association with Vice International) - Officially founded in 1999, Nunavut is the youngest territory in Canada. It's only been two generations since Canada's stewardship of the land forced the Inuit out of their semi-nomadic way of life and into a modern sedentary one. But while the introduction of contemporary conveniences seem to have made life more comfortable, the history of Canada in the arctic is mired in tragedy, and the traumatic effects of residential schools and forced relocations are still being felt. Today, Nunavut is in a state of social crisis: Crime rates are four times the national average and the rates of suicide are more than ten times higher than the rest of Canada. If you ask people here what the driving force of the problem is, a lot of them will say: alcohol. Even though alcohol is completely illegal in some parts of the territory, it's been reported that 95 percent of police calls are alcohol-related.

Why are Canadians Joining the Islamic State? (2015) (In association with Vice News) - Canadian authorities have reported that at least 130 citizens are involved extremist activities abroad, with 30 in Syria alone. In Calgary, five youths who attended the 8th & 8th Musallah mosque are known to have joined the Islamic State, leading the Canadian media to emphatically label Calgary a hotbed of terrorism. In response to two so-called "lone wolf" attacks last year, Canada's Conservative government introduced controversial anti-terrorism legislation, which some fear will only further marginalize the country's Muslim population. VICE founder Suroosh Alvi in association with Vice Canada Reports travels to Calgary to investigate allegations of radicalization among the city's Muslim youth, speaking with the imam of the 8th & 8th Musallah, as well as the mother of Damian Clairmont, who died in Syria fighting for the Islamic State.

The New Era of Canadian Sex Work (2015) - After the Canadian Supreme Court struck down laws around sex work as being harmful to people in the trade, the federal government passed Bill C-36, which criminalizes johns who patronize sex workers. The government argues these laws are intended to protect women from human traffickers, but critics say they make the trade more dangerous for those consensually doing sex work. It's now illegal for sex workers to advertise their services, and because johns are committing a crime, they may pressure workers to rush into encounters without vetting potential clients. We sent Lowell, a pop singer and former stripper, to meet with policy makers and law enforcement officials to discuss C-36. Lowell also went down to Nevada to see how a regulated, legal sex industry functions. Finally, she met with a john to see how he feels about his behavior becoming newly illegal.

Abortion Access in the Maritimes (2015) - Abortion has been a legal medical procedure in Canada for more than 25 years, but in spite of that, access varies widely across the country. Urban residents are far likelier to have easy access to the procedure, while rural people may face extra costs and time requirements like travel and figuring out where to go. In this edition of VICE Canada Reports, Sarah Ratchford investigates abortion access in New Brunswick and Prince Edward Island, two provinces with restricted access to abortions and conservative political climates that make access a difficult issue even to discuss. She attends an anti-abortion rally crashed by pro-choice activists, goes undercover into a pregnancy crisis center, and talks to an activist helping people access under-the-counter abortions in Prince Edward Island (PEI). New Brunswick has few options for people in need of abortions, especially for the rural majority of its population. PEI, though, offers no official abortions on the island; a recent change to increase access saw the provincial government deciding to pay for abortions in New Brunswick.

Trawling Winnipeg's Rivers for the Bodies of Unsolved Murder Cases (2015) - Winnipeg's Red River has long been thought of as the unofficial graveyard for the city's criminal underbelly. But when the body of a 15-year old First Nations girl named Tina Fontaine was pulled from the river wrapped in a garbage bag in August 2014, it shocked the city and the country as a whole. A group of volunteers decided to take to the water to do what they say police won't. VICE Canada Reports got embedded with the crew of "Drag the Red" ground searchers checking the banks of the river for fresh bodies and with a boat crew who use fish hooks to search the river for bodies that may have sunk to the bottom. We also spoke with the local police division about why they refuse to drag the river themselves and what's going on with the unsolved cases for missing and murdered aboriginal women.

On Hold: Canadian Transgender Health Access (2015) - Transgender health access is a rarely discussed but highly contentious topic in Canada. While nine out of ten provinces offer some access to some surgeries—though there is only one hospital, in Montreal, that provides the full gamut of treatments—New Brunswick stands alone by not offering any funded procedures to transgender individuals. That's why we went to Fredericton to let AJ Ripley, a non-binary transgender person who prefers the pronouns "they and them," take us through their life in New Brunswick fighting for access to proper health services. We then took AJ to Toronto to see how services differ in a big city, but even there, it's far from perfect.

A Family's Desperate Search for a Missing Woman Police Can't Find (2015) - Misty Faith Potts is a 38 year old Nakoda woman who disappeared in March 2015. She has an MSc in Environmental Science and taught at Yellowhead College but took a downward spiral into drugs after her brother died and her marriage unravelled. She was last seen at the store at Alexis Nakota Sioux First Nation an hour outside Edmonton and may have been on her way to the city. VICE Canada Reports meets with Misty's family members who have been combing through the worst drug corners in Edmonton and the fields and forests around Alexis and Paul first nations hoping to find clues leading to Misty's whereabouts. The family hasn't heard much from police and has taken the search for Misty into their own hands. Misty is one of the more than 1200 missing or murdered indigenous women across Canada.
