= Year of the Snake (EP) =

EP by Fucked Up
- Released: March 24, 2017
- Recorded: October 2014; April-July 2015
- Studio: Key Club Studios and Union Sound, Toronto
- Length: 30:00
- Label: Tankcrimes

Fucked Up chronology
Glass Boys (2014)	Year of the Snake (2017)	Dose Your Dreams (2018)

Zodiac series chronology
Year of the Hare (2015)	Year of the Snake (2017)	Year of the Horse (2021)

Professional ratings
Review scores
Source	Rating
AllMusic	4/5 stars
Pitchfork	7.4/10
New Noise	3/5 stars

Year of the Snake is a 2017 EP by Canadian punk band Fucked Up. Released through Tankcrimes, it is the band's eighth installment in its long-running Zodiac series based on the Chinese zodiac. The EP consists of two tracks and runs 30 minutes in length.

== Background ==
The Zodiac series originated as an unplanned experiment before evolving into a recurring outlet for long-form, stylistically exploratory compositions. Drummer Jonah Falco has described the series as a space for musical gestures and approaches that do not fit within the band's more conventional hardcore punk releases, allowing for extended runtimes and heightened theatricality.

== Concept and narrative ==
According to guitarist Mike Haliechuk, Year of the Snake is concerned with death, transformation, and rebirth, framing dying as an ongoing process rather than a fixed endpoint. Haliechuk described the EP as being about "how to die, or how to think about dying," with its themes informed by meditation, pilgrimage, and Buddhist ideas of impermanence and change.

Falco has stated that the Zodiac releases deliberately incorporate symbolic attributes traditionally associated with each animal, and that the snake's associations with calmness, reflection, and introspection aligned with the band’s mindset at the time of writing, as they were touring less and engaging in greater self-reflection.

== Music and composition ==
Year of the Snake is structured as a two-track EP. The title track spans approximately 24 minutes and unfolds in multiple movements, alternating between meditative passages and more aggressive sections rooted in hardcore punk.

The second track, "Passacaglia," serves as a shorter, more conventional composition. It is a six-minute instrumental written by drummer Jonah Falco and does not feature vocals by Damian Abraham.

== Track listing ==
All tracks are written by Fucked Up.

No.	Title	Length
1.	"Year of the Snake"	23:56
2.	"Passacaglia"	6:04

== Additional contributors ==
- Bill Skibbe, Leon Taheny, and Alex Gamble – recording
- Jonny Schenke – mastering
- Leon Taheny – mixing
- Jaclyn Blumas – additional vocals
- Brandon Valdivia and Leon Taheny – additional percussion
- Yoobin Ahn – violin
- Moshe Rozenberg – additional synth
- Fred Tomaselli - cover art
- Alexandra Mackenzie – lyrics sheet art
