= CTD =

CTD may refer to:

== Medicine ==
- Carnitine transporter deficiency, an inborn error of fatty acid transport
- Cumulative trauma disorders, another common name for Repetitive Strain Injury
- Comparative Toxicogenomics Database, an online research tool describing chemical-gene-disease interactions
- CTD (chemotherapy), a combination of the drugs cyclophosphamide, thalidomide, and dexamethasone
- Common Technical Document, an internationally agreed format for drug approvals
- Connective tissue disease

== Music ==
- Crash Test Dummies, a Canadian rock band from Winnipeg, Manitoba

== Science ==
- Comparative Toxicogenomics Database, an online research tool describing chemical-gene-disease interactions
- CTD (instrument), in oceanography, used to determine conductivity, temperature, and depth
- Carboxy-Terminal Domain, the end of an amino acid chain which has specialized functions in some proteins
- Church–Turing–Deutsch principle, in computer science, relates to the universality of simulation

== Other ==
- CBS Television Distribution
- Central de Trabajadores Democráticos, a trade union centre in El Salvador
- Counter Terrorism Department (Pakistan), Pakistani agency for counter terrorism
- FBI Counterterrorism Division, the United States Federal Bureau of Investigation's anti-terrorism division
- Crash to desktop, a kind of computer crash
- Cummins Turbo Diesel, acronym for an engine genre

== See also ==
- Circle the Drain
