= Fred Tomaselli =

American painter

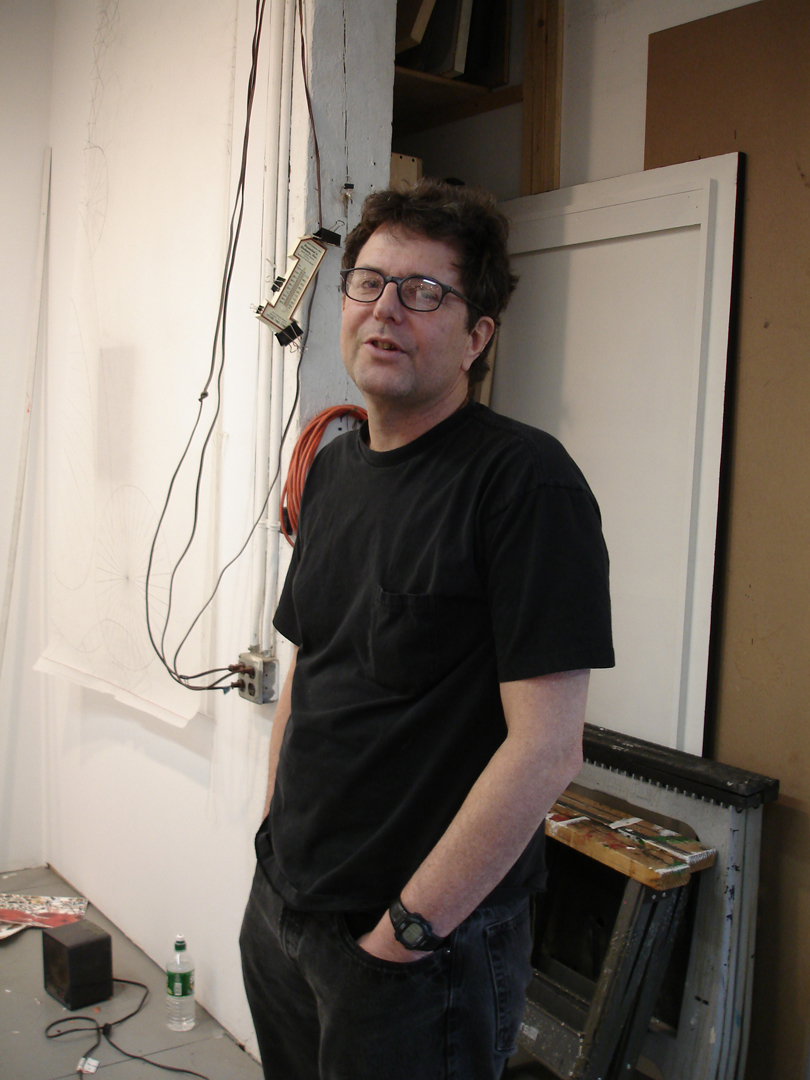
- Fred Tomaselli in his Brooklyn studio, 2006
- Born: 1956; Santa Monica, California
- Education: California State University, Fullerton
- Known for: Painting

Fred Tomaselli (born in Santa Monica, California, in 1956) is an American artist. He is best known for his highly detailed paintings on wood panels, combining an array of unorthodox materials suspended in a thick layer of clear, epoxy resin.

== The Art of Tomaselli ==
Tomaselli's paintings include medicinal herbs, prescription pills and hallucinogenic plants alongside images cut from books and magazines: flowers, birds, butterflies, arms, legs and noses, which are combined into patterns that spread over the surface of the painting like a virus or growth. He uses an explosion of color and combines it with a basis in art history. His style usually involves collage, painting, and/or glazing. He seals the collages in resin after gluing them down and going over them with different varnishes.

I want people to get lost in the work. I want to seduce people into it and I want people to escape inside the world of the work. In that way the work is pre-Modernist. I throw all of my obsessions and loves into the work, and I try not to be too embarrassed about any of it. I love nature, I love gardening, I love watching birds, and all of that gets into the work. I just try to be true to who I am and make the work I want to see. I don’t have a radical agenda.

Tomaselli sees his paintings and their compendium of data as windows into a surreal, hallucinatory universe. “It is my ultimate aim”, he says, “to seduce and transport the viewer in to space of these pictures while simultaneously revealing the mechanics of that seduction.” Tomaselli has also incorporated allegorical figures into his work – in Untitled (Expulsion) (2000), for example, he borrows the Adam and Eve figures from Masaccio's Expulsion from the Garden of Eden (1426–27), and in Field Guides (2003) he creates his own version of the grim reaper. His figures are described anatomically so that their organs and veins are exposed in the manner of a scientific drawing. He writes that his “inquiry into utopia/dystopia – framed by artifice but motivated by the desire for the real – has turned out to be the primary subject of my work”.

== Album covers ==
Tomaselli's artwork has been on the front cover of several albums. He designed the front cover artwork for Laura Cantrell's third album Humming by the Flowered Vine on Matador Records. His painting, Gravity In Four Directions, was also used as partial cover artwork for The Magnetic Fields' album i. He also has artwork featured in The Wilco Book, a book made by the band Wilco. His artwork is portrayed on Phish's eleventh studio album, Joy, which was released September 8, 2009. His art also appears on the CD by Elysian Fields Dreams That Breathe Your Name released in July 2004. In 2017, Tomaselli's artwork was used on the cover of the Fucked Up EP Year of the Snake.

== Selected solo exhibitions ==
- Joslyn Art Museum, Omaha, Nebraska (2019)
- Orange County Museum of Art, Newport Beach, California (2015)
- University of Michigan Museum of Art, Ann Arbor, Michigan (2014)
- James Cohan Gallery, New York (2014)
- Brooklyn Museum, New York (2010)
- White Cube, London (2009)
- The Rose Art Museum, Massachusetts (2005)
- IMMA, Dublin (2005)
- Fruitmarket Gallery, Edinburgh (2004)
- Albright-Knox Gallery of Art, Buffalo, New York (2003)
- James Cohan Gallery, New York (2003)
- White Cube, London (2001)
- SITE Santa Fe, New Mexico (2001)
- Palm Beach Institute of Contemporary Art, Florida (2001)
- Whitney Museum of American Art, New York, (1999)
