= Year of the Horse =

Year of the Horse may refer to:

- Year of the Horse (film), a 1997 concert documentary directed by Jim Jarmusch
- Year of the Horse (Neil Young album), a 1997 live album by Neil Young and Crazy Horse
- Year of the Horse (Fucked Up album), a 2021 album by Fucked Up
- Horse (zodiac), the seventh of the 12-year cycle of animals which appear in the Chinese zodiac related to the Chinese calendar
