= Grass Can Move Stones Part 1: Year of the Goat =

2025 album by Fucked Up

Studio album by Fucked Up
- Released: December 12, 2025
- Recorded: September 2019 – June 2025
- Studios: Union Sound; Palace Studios; Gold Standard Recordings (Toronto); Fuzzbrain Studios (London)
- Length: 55:26
- Labels: Tankcrimes, Hidden World
- Producer: Fucked Up

Fucked Up releases chronology
Some Day (2024)	Grass Can Move Stones Part 1: Year of the Goat (2025)

Zodiac series chronology
Year of the Horse (2021)	Grass Can Move Stones Part 1: Year of the Goat (2025)	Grass Can Move Stones Part 2: Year of the Monkey (2026)

Grass Can Move Stones Part 1: Year of the Goat is a 2025 album by Canadian punk band Fucked Up. It is the first installment in the three-album series Grass Can Move Stones, concluding the band's long-running Zodiac series.

== Release ==
Side A of the album, titled "Long Ago Gardens", was released digitally on October 3, 2025. Side B, "Rivers and Lakes", followed on December 5 through the band's Bandcamp page. The album was officially released on physical format on December 12, 2025, through Tankcrimes.

== Background ==
Grass Can Move Stones is a three-album series that serves as a conclusion to Fucked Up's Zodiac series, comprising Year of the Goat, Year of the Monkey, and Year of the Rooster.

The project is loosely inspired by the Chinese literary classic Journey to the West, and follows the story of Monkey (voiced by vocalist Damian Abraham) and Good Goat (voiced by collaborator Tuka Mohammed). Other guest vocalists include Jennifer Castle, Tamara Lindeman of the Weather Station, and Dwid Hellion of Integrity.

== Critical reception ==
Professional ratings
Review scores
Source	Rating
AllMusic	3.5/5
Noizze	6/10

Reviewing the album for Treble, Langdon Hickman praised the band's ambition and named it Album of the Week. In Flood Magazine, Tom Morgan described the record as "artistically commendable and consistently intriguing," while noting that its extended runtime may test the listener's patience.

Noelle May Torres of mxdwn praised its scope and vision, stating it "is a necessary reminder of what music is truly capable of".

Rowan Bruce of Noizze awarded the album 6 out of 10, praising its experimentation while noting that its dense narrative and length may challenge new listeners.

== Track listing ==
No.	Title	Length
1.	"Long Ago Gardens"	28:12
2.	"Rivers and Lakes"	27:14
Total length:		55:26

== Personnel ==
Credits adapted from Bandcamp and liner notes.

Fucked Up

- Damian Abraham – vocals
- Jonah Falco – drums
- Mike Haliechuk – guitar, lyrics
- Sandy Miranda – bass
- Josh Zucker – guitar

Additional musicians

- Tuka Mohammed – vocals
- Jennifer Castle – vocals
- Tamara Lindeman – vocals
- Dwid Hellion – vocals

Production

- Alex Gamble – recording
- Jonah Falco – recording (London)
- Dylan Frankland – vocal recording
- Arthur Rizk – mastering
- Fucked Up – production

Artwork

- Daniel St-Amant – artwork
- Daniel Murphy – layout
