= Trevor Blumas =

Canadian actor, singer and songwriter

- Born: October 16, 1984 (age 40); London, Ontario, Canada
- Occupation(s): Actor, singer-songwriter
- Years active: 1997–2015

Trevor Blumas (born October 16, 1984) is a Canadian television and film actor and singer-songwriter.

== Early life and career ==
Blumas was born in London, Ontario, Canada, and attended the Lester B. Pearson School for the Arts, studying drama, music, dance, and art. Blumas was part of the Original Kids Theatre Company in Ontario alongside Rachel McAdams, and Amber Marshall. He was nominated in 1999 Young Artist Award for "Best Performance", for his performance in Stranger in Town. Blumas co-starred in the 2005 Disney film Ice Princess alongside Hayden Panettiere (who portrayed his sister) and Michelle Trachtenberg. Blumas studied film at Santa Monica College and has studied cinema studies and art history at the University of Toronto.

=== Music ===
As a teenager, Blumas took a break from acting to form the reggae band "Staylefish." The band went on to receive minor success around the Canadian college circuit, before Trevor left for Los Angeles to pursue his acting career. After re-locating back to Toronto, he started Corduroy (or Whatever Happened to Corduroy?) an indie-rock group that independently released a series of PWYC demo ep's they dubbed Demoroy's. Corduroy's music recently appeared in an online campaign for Chevrolet and in an episode of Degrassi: The Next Generation. Corduroy eventually dissolved in 2010. Trevor went on to work on Doom Squad, an electronic music project he started with his two sisters Jaclyn and Allie. In early 2011, Doom Squad released their debut EP entitled "Land O' The Silver Birch" and subsequently set out on a west coast tour to promote it.

Blumas directed and starred in the 2015 music video for Fucked Up's song "Year of the Hare". Blumas would go on to direct the music video for Fucked Up's song "Year of the Horse" in 2021.

Blumas wrote and directed the upcoming short film "Hello, My Name is Beaver"

== Filmography ==
=== Film ===
Film
Year	Film	Role	Notes
1999	Dinner at Fred's	Young Richard	
1999	Switching Goals	Greg Jeffries	
2001	The Unsaid	Kyle Hunter	
2005	Ice Princess	Teddy Harwood	

=== Television ===
Television
Year	Title	Role	Notes
1997	Earth: Final Conflict	Jebediah Good	1 episode
1998	The Wall	Ben Holst	Television movie (segment: The Pencilholder)
1998	Due South	Young Fraser	1 episode
1998	Stranger in Town	Aaron	Television movie
1998	Little Men	Nathanel Blake	2 seasons
1999	Monet: Shadow and Light	Daniel Fontaine	Television movie
1999	Seasons of Love	Young Hocking	Television movie
1999	Switching Goals	Greg Jeffries	Television movie
2000	Virtual Mom	Tom	Television movie
2000	Twice in a Lifetime	Young Ben Bogart	"Curveball" (Season 2, Episode 4)
2001	Twice in a Lifetime	Teenage Ryan Storey	"The Choice" (Season 2, Episode 22)
2001	Inside the Osmonds	Jimmy Osmond (older)	Television movie
2001	Jane Doe	Michael Doe	Television movie
2002	Guilt by Association	Teenage Max	Television movie
2004	Prom Queen: The Marc Hall Story	Beau	Television movie
2007	Too Young to Marry	Carter	Television movie
2011	Warehouse 13	Geoffery Cedolia	"Trials" (Episode 2, Season 3)
