= Year of the Hare (EP) =

EP by Fucked Up
- Released: June 16, 2015
- Recorded: April 2013 ("Year of the Hare") & November 2014 ("California Cold") at Electrical Audio (Chicago, IL); Key Club Studios (Benton Harbor, MI); and Candle Studios (Toronto, ON)
- Length: 29:59
- Label: Deathwish (DW172)
- Producer: Mike Haliechuk, Bill Skibbe, Leon Taheny

Fucked Up releases chronology
Glass Boys (2014)	Year of the Hare (2015)	Year of the Snake (2017)

Fucked Up Zodiac series chronology
Year of the Dragon (2014)	Year of the Hare (2015)	Year of the Snake (2017)

Year of the Hare is an EP by the Canadian rock band Fucked Up and marks the seventh entry in their Zodiac Series of releases, each named after a different Chinese zodiac sign of the Chinese calendar. The EP was released on June 16, 2015 through Deathwish Inc., which is run by Jacob Bannon of Converge, who also contributed to the EP's artwork and packaging. The lyrical content, the title track's composition, and accompanying interactive music video all make allusions to time, loops and rabbits.

== Recording and composition ==
The two tracks on the EP were recorded over two years in three different studios, including time during the sessions for their 2014 studio album Glass Boys, when the members grew bored of working on the album and wanted to work on something else. Inspired by the books This Is Your Brain on Music and Perfecting Sound Forever, Fucked Up guitarist Mike Haliechuk said the band was looking for more experimental ways to record music that catered to the fact that sound is a subjective experience. The song was also intentionally made to be "a bit confusing and less structured" than a typical Fucked Up track, with a composition inspired by the structures of some movies or books.

The opening of "Year of the Hare" features several minutes of noise, which was a recording of an empty studio that was then played in the studio and recorded again and again through several iterations until the resulting recording became a "gnarly sounding industrial hum." Other experimental recording and production techniques on "Year of the Hare" included a recording of a member thinking of a lyric, recording members entering and exiting the sound stage, digital manipulation of audio, and audio loops inspired by Talking Heads's 1980 album Remain in Light and William Basinski's 2002/2003 album series The Disintegration Loops. The theme of "Year of the Hare" is "time, and becoming lost in it" and the lyrics make several references to rabbits, which are meant to be a "symbol for how little tasks and stresses seem to overpopulate our senses in daily life."

== Promotion ==
Fucked Up teased the EP by premiering the 8-minute-long track "California Cold" for online streaming two months ahead of release on April 20, 2015. The band also embarked on a May–August 2015 (expanded with additional dates from its original run ending in July) North American and European Zodiac Tour, in which the band's lineup was expanded to a nine-piece band incorporating members from tour-opener Doomsquad, and they performed various songs from their Zodiac releases.

== Interactive music video ==
Canadian actor Trevor Blumas portraying the music video's protagonist going about his mundane life while being followed by a man wearing a rabbit suit (as seen in the subway window's reflection).

On June 3, 2015, the band released an interactive music video for "Year of the Hare" co-created by Fucked Up and Canadian actor/musician Trevor Blumas (Warehouse 13, Twice in a Lifetime, Ice Princess). The video was presented in a series of loops for both the video and the "Year of the Hare" audio—25 short pieces of the whole project repeating an infinite number of times and connected in a random order, resulting in a different experience for each viewer. The viewer was expected to figure out how to progress through the video on his or her own while only being given the pre-video instructions of: "Use your keyboard to escape the loops." Some keyboard commands paused, played or advanced the loops, while others affected the video and audio's speed.

Through the jumbled loops and clips, the video tells the story of a young businessman getting ready for work and heading to the office. Throughout his day, he sees several stuffed rabbits or people in rabbit costumes. Fucked Up compared the video to the 1993 Bill Murray film Groundhog Day, saying the video is loosely about a man who cannot escape the worst day of his life. Fucked Up guitarist Mike Haliechuk said the song is composed of audio loops, and the video in both theme and delivery reinforce this idea. He said, "The video for the song is obviously a stretch and very surreal but it's not really far for some people I don't think. Wake up, make eggs, take the train, have a few suits you wear during the week, etc. I mean everything good is just the result of someone doing something really boring the same way for a long time and then having it transcend." Haliechuk also described the interactive video as being intentionally "unsolvable" because it fit with the theme of the song and that it was "an appropriate way to premiere the song online—in small little chunks of time that are impossible to navigate through, you can only get lost in them and try to find your way out."

== Reception ==
Professional ratings
Aggregate scores
Source	Rating
Metacritic	72/100
Review scores
Source	Rating
AllMusic	3.5/5 stars
NME	8/10
Pitchfork	6.0/10.0
Punknews.org	4/5 stars
PopMatters	9/10
DIY	5/5 stars

Upon release, Year of the Hare was met with average to positive reviews from music critics. At Metacritic, which assigns a normalized rating out of 100 to reviews from music critics, the EP received an average score of 72, which indicates "generally favorable reviews," based on 6 ratings.

== Track listing ==
No.	Title	Lyrics	Music	Length
1.	"Year of the Hare"	Mike Haliechuk	Haliechuk, Jonah Falco, Josh Zucker	21:38
2.	"California Cold"	Damian Abraham	Haliechuk, Abraham	8:21

== Personnel ==
Year of the Hare personnel adapted from liner notes.

=== Fucked Up ===
- Damian Abraham – lyrics for "California Cold," vocals
- Jonah Falco – guitars, bass, drums, piano, Mellotron
- Mike Haliechuk – lyrics for "Year of the Hare," guitars
- Sandy Miranda – bass
- Josh Zucker – guitars, Mellotron

=== Additional musicians ===
- Isla Craig – additional vocals on "Year of the Hare"
- Jane Fair (Jonah Falco's mother) – flutes, saxophone
- Moshe Rosenburg – synths

=== Production and recording ===
- Brad Boatright – mastering at Audioseige
- Mike Haliechuk – production
- Bill Skibbe – recording at Electrical Audio, recording at Key Club Studios, production
- Leon Taheny – recording at Candle Studios, production, mixing

=== Artwork and design ===
- Jacob Bannon – original artwork
- Mike Haliechuk – layout, design
- Sandy Miranda – layout, design
