= Year of the Tiger (song) =

Single by Fucked Up
- Released: February 7, 2012
- Recorded: June 2010; August 2010; September 2010; February 2011
- Studio: 6 Nassau Studio, Toronto; XL Studio, London; SMT Studio, New York
- Length: 37:34
- Label: Matador
- Producers: Mike Haliechuk, Jonah Falco

Fucked Up Zodiac series chronology
Year of the Ox (2010)	Year of the Tiger (2012)	Year of the Dragon (2014)

Year of the Tiger is a release by Canadian punk band Fucked Up. It is the fifth installment in the band’s long-running Chinese zodiac series, in which the group issues an extended recording for each year of the lunar calendar.

== Background ==
Year of the Tiger was released on February 7, 2012, coinciding with the Chinese New Year, as part of Fucked Up’s ongoing Zodiac singles series. The title track had been completed well before its release, with much of the recording predating work on their 2011 album David Comes to Life.

The release was issued on 12-inch vinyl through Matador Records, with a portion of proceeds benefiting the Save the Tiger fund.

== Composition ==
The title track, "Year of the Tiger", runs approximately fifteen minutes and features guest contributions from filmmaker Jim Jarmusch, electronic band Austra, and Annie-Claude Deschênes of Duchess Says.

The B-side, "Onno", is a twenty-two-minute instrumental composition described by the band as a studio experiment and a "weird rager".

== Track listing ==
Credits adapted from Bandcamp.

No.	Title	Length
1.	"Year of the Tiger"	15:28
2.	"Onno"	22:06

== Critical reception ==
Critical response to Year of the Tiger was generally positive. Writing for Pitchfork, Douglas Wolk described the release as fully album-length in scope, noting its ambitious structure and extended runtime, and awarded it a score of 7.5 out of 10.

Spin rated the release 7 out of 10, characterizing the title track as meticulously arranged while describing "Onno" as more monotonous and experimental in nature.

NME highlighted the title track’s theatrical scope and guest contributions, calling it a "bells-and-whistles" entry in the band’s Zodiac series.

== Personnel ==
Credits adapted from the album's liner notes.

=== Fucked Up ===
- Damian Abraham – vocals
- Jonah Falco – guitar, drums
- Mike Haliechuk – guitar
- Ben Cook - guitar
- Sandy Miranda – bass, back cover artwork, artwork design, and layout
- Josh Zucker – guitar

=== Additional contributors ===
- Jon Drew – recording
- Rodaidh McDonald - recording
- Shane Stoneback – recording, mixing
- Jeff McMurrich - recording
- Joseph Donovan - recording
- Lorne Hounsell – recording
- Greg Calbi – mastering
- Jim Jarmusch – backup vocals
- Annie-Claude Deschênes – backup vocals
- Katie Stelmanis – piano
- Maya Postepski – synths
