= Year of the Horse (Fucked Up album) =

Studio album by Fucked Up
- Released: May 7, 2021
- Recorded: February 5, 2016–February 5, 2021
- Studio: Union Sound, Toronto; The Hive, Toronto; Candle Recording, Toronto (Abraham vocals); TRC Studios, London (Mills & Mohammed vocals, piano, trumpet, percussion); Palmer Sound Studio, Toronto (bass); Fuzzbrain Studios, Leyton, UK (additional recording); Knobworld Stuido, Los Angeles (Berninger vocals)
- Length: 94:19
- Label: Tankcrimes; Fucked Up Records
- Producer: Fucked Up

Fucked Up releases chronology
Dose Your Dreams (2018)	Year of the Horse (2021)	One Day (2023)

Zodiac series chronology
Year of the Snake (2017)	Year of the Horse (2021)	Grass Can Move Stones Part 1: Year of the Goat (2025)

Professional ratings
Review scores
Source	Rating
Pitchfork	7.8/10
Exclaim!	9/10
Punknews.org	4.5/5 stars

Year of the Horse is a 2021 self-released concept album by Canadian punk band Fucked Up. It is the ninth installment in the band's long-running Zodiac series and is structured as a single composition divided into four movements. It was recorded between 2016 and 2021. Year of the Horse was released in stages on Bandcamp, beginning with the first act on February 5, 2021, and concluding with the fourth act on May 6, 2021, followed by the official digital release of the full album on May 7, 2021. The album's physical editions were released by Tankcrimes in August 2021.

== Concept and narrative ==
Year of the Horse is a dramatic concept album written by guitarist Mike Haliechuk, in collaboration with Toronto playwright David James Brock.

The story involves a mythical horse named Perceval on the run from an evil wizard king, King Sour, and attempts to reach her rightful home among the moon and stars. The album is broken into four acts and individual scenes, following Perceval as she flees the town of Abfall and is pursued into surrounding wastelands by a posse led by a merciless sheriff named Bloody Lance.

== Music and composition ==
Year of the Horse is structured as a single, continuous composition divided into four acts, each functioning as a movement within a larger narrative arc. Across its roughly 94-minute runtime, the album incorporates a wide range of musical styles, including hardcore punk, metal, psychedelic rock, experimental pop, folk, ambient music, Western, and classical-influenced elements. Rather than presenting discrete songs, each act is composed of multiple interconnected scenes, with recurring motifs.

The album contains several guest vocalists, including Julien Baker of Boygenius, Matt Berninger of the National, Maegan Brooks Mills of Chubby and the Gang, as well as Tuka Mohammed and Eidolon.

== Dedication ==
The album is dedicated to Iron Age guitarist Wade Allison and Power Trip singer Riley Gale, who both died in 2020.

== Track listing ==
All lyrics are written by Mike Haliechuk; all music is composed by Fucked Up.

No.	Title	Vocals	Length
1.	"Act I"	Damian Abraham, Maegan Brooks Mills, Eidolon, Tuka Mohammed	19:25
2.	"Act II"	Abraham, Mohammed, Eidolon, Mills, Jonah Falco	26:31
3.	"Act III"	Abraham, Mills, Mohammed, Matt Berninger	22:07
4.	"Act IV"	Abraham, Eidolon, Mohammed, Mills, Julien Baker, Falco	26:16

== Personnel ==
Fucked Up

- Damian Abraham – lead vocals (1–4)
- Mike Haliechuk – guitar (1–4), drums (1–4), cello (1, 3, 4), piano (2–4), synth (2–3), percussion (2), vibraphone (2), whistling (2), keyboards (4)
- Josh Zucker – guitar (1)
- Sandy Miranda – bass (1–3), recording engineer (bass at Union Sound and Palmer Stone Studio)
- Jonah Falco – drums (1–4), guitar (1–4), trumpets (1–4), piano (1–4), synth (1–3), bass (2, 4), percussion (2), vibraphone (2), additional vocals (2, 4), keyboards (4), recording engineer (additional vocals, piano, trumpet, and percussion at TRC Studios)

Additional musicians

- Maegan Brooks Mills – additional vocals (Act I, Scene Two; Act II, Scene Three; Act III, Scene One & Scene Four; Act IV, Scene Three)
- Tuka Mohammed – additional vocals (Act I, Scene Four; Act II, Scene Two & Scene Five; Act III, Scene One & Scene Three; Act IV, Scene Two & Scene Four)
- Eidolon – additional vocals (Act I, Scene Four; Act II, Scene Two, Scene Five & Scene Six; Act IV, Scene One)
- Matt Berninger – additional vocals (Act III, Scene Four)
- Julien Baker – additional vocals (Act IV, Scene Five)
- Yoobin Ahn – violin (1)
- Cory Latkovich – cello (3)
- Nick Storring – cello (3)

Technical

- Alex Gamble – recording engineer (Union Sound, The Hive), mixing
- Dylan Frankland – recording engineer (Candle Recording)
- Kristian Robinson – recording engineer (TRC Studios)
- Ben Spense – recording engineer (Fuzzbrain Studios)
- Sean O'Brien – recording engineer (Knobworld Studio)
- Dan Randall – mastering
- Nadia C. Tan – artwork
- Mark Reategui – layout and design
