= Another Day (Fucked Up album) =

Studio album by Fucked Up
- Released: August 9, 2024
- Recorded: May 2022–November 2023
- Studio: Candle (Toronto); The Stationhouse (Armley); Palmer Stone (Toronto)
- Length: 37:00
- Producer: Mike Haliechuk

Fucked Up chronology
One Day (2023)	Another Day (2024)	Someday (2024)

Singles from Another Day
- 1. "Stimming" Released: June 10, 2024; 2. "Another Day" Released: June 24, 2024; 3. "Divining Gods" Released: July 15, 2024

Another Day is the seventh studio album by Canadian post-hardcore band Fucked Up. Produced by guitarist, songwriter and occasional lead vocalist Mike Haliechuk, the album was self-released on August 9, 2024, and is a direct sequel album to the band's previous album, One Day (2023).

Using the same recording approach as One Day, each band member recorded their respective studio parts within a strict 24-hour timeframe. The album is the first to feature recording contributions from guitarist Josh Zucker since Glass Boys (2014).

== Background and recording ==
The album was primarily written and recorded over the course of 2022 and 2023, with sessions taking place at various studios across Toronto and London. The initial guitar tracks were laid down in May 2022 at Candle Studios in Toronto, and engineered by Alex Gamble. During the same month, drums were recorded at both Palace Studios in Toronto and Fuzzbrain Studios in London, with additional drum recordings taking place at the Total Refreshment Centre in London. Gamble also oversaw these sessions.

In October 2022, Sandy Miranda recorded the bass parts at Palmer Stone Studios in Toronto. By July 2022, guitarist Josh Zucker completed his recordings at Candle Studios. The lead vocals, primarily performed by Damian Abraham, were recorded by Dylan Frankland at Foran Sound/Wychwood Sounds in Toronto in November 2023, and was mastered in March 2024.

The album was announced in June 2024, about 18 months after their previous album, One Day.

On August 6th, three days prior to album's release, the band held a 24-hour recording session in which they wrote, recorded, mixed and mastered an entirely new album. This session was live-streamed in its entirety. The album was immediately released on BandCamp on August 7th, titled Who's Got The Time And A Half? and was available only for a period of 24 hours.

== Album artwork ==
The album features original cover art by Daniel Murphy, with additional artwork including a hedge photograph by Maksym Kaharlytskyi and a band photo by Colin Medley. Art direction was led by Mike Haliechuk, with layout and design by Daniel Murphy.

== Critical reception ==
Professional ratings
Aggregate scores
Source	Rating
AnyDecentMusic?	6.9/10
Metacritic	74/100
Review scores
Source	Rating
AllMusic	3.5/5 stars
Classic Rock	3.5/5 stars
Far Out	3.5/5 stars
Kerrang!	3/5
The Line of Best Fit	8/10
Mojo	3/5 stars
Pitchfork	7.3/10
PopMatters	9/10
Spin	B−
Uncut	6/10

Another Day was well received by contemporary music critics. On review aggregator, Metacritic, Another Day has an average rating of 74 out of 100 indicating "generally favorable reviews".

== Track listing ==
All lyrics are written by Mike Haliechuk, except where noted; all music is composed by Damian Abraham, Jonah Falco, Mike Haliechuk, Sandy Miranda, Josh Zucker.

Another Day track listing
No.	Title	Lyrics	Length
1.	"Face"		3:19
2.	"Stimming"		2:53
3.	"Tell Yourself You Will"		3:39
4.	"Another Day"	Abraham	4:04
5.	"Paternal Instinct"	Abraham	4:06
6.	"Divining Gods"	Abraham	3:53
7.	"The One to Break It"	Abraham	2:41
8.	"More"		4:08
9.	"Fellow Fine Feeling"		2:59
10.	"House Lights"	Abraham	5:18
Total length:			37:00

== Personnel ==
Fucked Up

- Damian Abraham – lead vocals (1–8, 10)
- Mike Haliechuk – lead guitar, backing vocals; lead vocals (9); producer
- Josh Zucker – rhythm guitar
- Sandy Miranda – bass guitar
- Jonah Falco – drums, backing vocals

Additional musicians

- Sam Bielanski – backing vocals
- Pretty Matty – backing vocals
- Charlie Manning Walker – backing vocals
- Holden Abraham – backing vocals
- Dylan Frankland – backing vocals
- Danko Jones – backing vocals

Recording and mastering

- Alex Gamble – engineering, mixing (Candle Studios, Palace Studios, Fuzzbrain Studios, Total Refreshment Centre)
- Dylan Frankland – lead vocals recording engineer (Foran Sound/Wychwood Sounds)
- Sandy Miranda – bass recording engineer (Palmer Stone Studios)
- Arthur Rizk – mastering

Artwork

- Daniel Murphy – album artwork
- Maksym Kaharlytskyi – photography
- Colin Medley – photography
- Mike Haliechuk – art direction
