= Circle the Drain =

Circle the Drain or Circling the Drain may refer to:

- Circling the Drain, a 1999 compilation of short stories by Amanda Davis
- "Circling the Drain", a song from the 2004 Fucked Up album Epics in Minutes
- Circling the Drain, a working title (c. 2004) for the television series House
- "Circle the Drain" (Katy Perry song), 2010
- "Circle the Drain" (Soccer Mommy song), 2020
- "Circle the Drain", a song by 36 Crazyfists on the 2002 album Bitterness the Star
- "Circle the Drain", a song by Wage War on the 2021 album Manic

== See also ==
- Coriolis force
