= Year of the Ox (song) =

2010 EP by Fucked Up

Single by Fucked Up
- Released: September 28, 2010
- Recorded: November 16–19, 2009
- Studio: Giant Studios, Toronto
- Length: 24:52
- Label: Merge Records, Matador Records
- Producers: Fucked Up, Jon Drew

Fucked Up Zodiac series chronology
Year of the Rat (2009)	Year of the Ox (2010)	Year of the Tiger (2012)

Year of the Ox is a single by Canadian hardcore punk band Fucked Up. It is the fourth installment in the band's Zodiac Series.

== Release ==
Merge Records released Year of the Ox in North America on September 28, 2010, on 12-inch vinyl and digital download. Outside North America, it was released by Matador Records.

A colored vinyl repress was issued in 2022.

== Background ==
The single was recorded November 16–19, 2009, at Giant Studios in Toronto by producer Jon Drew, who also mixed the record at Central Audio.

Included as a B-side with the 13-minute title track is the 11-minute "Solomon's Song".

The title track features additional vocals from Nika Roza Danilova of Zola Jesus and strings performed by the Toronto quartet Old Strings New Puppets. "Solomon's Song" includes a five-minute saxophone solo by Aerin Fogel and synthesizer contributions from Maya Postepski.

== Track listing ==
1. "Year of the Ox" – 13:01
2. "Solomon's Song" – 11:51

== Personnel ==
Adapted from Bandcamp credits and liner notes.

Fucked Up

- Damian Abraham – vocals
- Sandy Miranda – bass
- Mike Haliechuk – guitar, lyrics
- Josh Zucker – guitar
- Ben Cook – guitar
- Jonah Falco – drums

Additional musicians

- Nika Roza Danilova – additional vocals
- Old Strings New Puppets – strings, featuring:
  - Boris Kupesic – violin
  - Diane Leung – viola
  - Elspeth Poole – cello
- Maya Postepski – synthesizer
- Aerin Fogel – saxophone
- Michael Armstrong – MPC percussion

Production

- Jon Drew – recording, mixing, engineering
- Fucked Up, Jon Drew – production
- Jeff Lipton – mastering

Art

- Susan Gale - A–side and B–side art
- Sandy Miranda - design and layout
- Mike Haliechuk - design and layout
