= The Chemistry of Common Life =

Studio album by Fucked Up
- Released: October 7, 2008
- Recorded: January – June 2008 at Halla Music Studios and Central Audio Studios, Toronto
- Genre: Hardcore punk, indie rock
- Length: 52:20; 56:56 (vinyl)
- Label: Matador
- Producer: Jon Drew and Fucked Up

Fucked Up chronology
| Hidden World (2006) | The Chemistry of Common Life (2008) | David Comes to Life (2011) |

Professional ratings
Aggregate scores
| Source | Rating |
|---|---|
| Metacritic | 85/100 |
Review scores
| Source | Rating |
| AllMusic | 4/5 stars |
| Alternative Press | 4.5/5 stars |
| The A.V. Club | A |
| Blender | 4/5 stars |
| Mojo | 4/5 stars |
| NME | 8/10 |
| Pitchfork | 8.8/10 |
| Q | 4/5 stars |
| Spin | 4/5 stars |
| Uncut | 4/5 stars |

The Chemistry of Common Life is the second full-length studio album by Canadian hardcore punk band Fucked Up. It was released on October 7, 2008, on Matador Records in CD and double LP formats and on Welfare Records in Reel-to-reel Audio Tapes. The statement on the label's site describes it as "an expansive epic about the mysteries of birth, death, and the origins of life (and re-living)".

The album is named after a book by James F. W. Johnston, which (among other things) describes hallucinogenic properties of mushrooms and plants. The title for the track "The Peaceable Kingdom" is taken from a famous painting by American folk-painter Edward Hicks. The cover art depicts the phenomenon of Manhattanhenge.

The album won the 2009 Polaris Music Prize.

== Track listing ==
All tracks are written by Mike Haliechuk and Fucked Up, except where noted. Lyrics by Haliechuk, except where noted.

| No. | Title | Lyrics | Music | Length |
|---|---|---|---|---|
| 1. | "Son the Father" | Damian Abraham | | 6:32 |
| 2. | "Magic Word" | | | 3:21 |
| 3. | "Golden Seal" | instrumental | Haliechuk, Corona | 3:35 |
| 4. | "Days of Last" | Abraham | | 4:31 |
| 5. | "Crooked Head" | | | 5:55 |
| 6. | "No Epiphany" | | Jonah Falco, Fucked Up | 4:19 |
| 7. | "Black Albino Bones" | Abraham | | 4:14 |
| 8. | "Royal Swan" | | Falco | 4:49 |
| 9. | "Twice Born" | Abraham | Falco | 4:26 |
| 10. | "Looking for God" | instrumental | Haliechuk, Corona | 3:15 |
| 11. | "The Chemistry of Common Life" | | | 7:23 |

The song "The Peaceable Kingdom" (4:25) is only available on vinyl, iTunes Music Store, and Apple Music, as track 7.

== Personnel ==
Fucked Up

- Pink Eyes (Damian Abraham) – vocals (1, 2, 4–9, 11)
- 10,000 Marbles (Mike Haliechuk) – guitar (1–7, 10, 11), hand claps (2), shaker (2), tambourine (2, 5), humming (6, 11), acoustic guitar (11), backing vocals (11)
- Gulag (Josh Zucker) – guitar (1, 2, 4–7, 9, 11), hand claps (2), humming (11)
- Mustard Gas (Sandy Miranda) – bass (1–9, 11), drum seat (2)
- Mr. Jo (Jonah Falco) – drums (1, 2, 4–7, 9, 11), guitar (1, 2, 6, 8, 9), hand claps (2), humming (6, 11), acoustic guitar (11)
- Young Governor (Ben Cook) – backing vocals (4)

Additional musicians

- Justin Small – backing vocals (1)
- Katia Taylor – backing vocals (1)
- Jane Fair – flute (1, 11)
- Jonathan Adjemian – Farfisa organ (2)
- Max McCabe Lokos – organ (2, 8), Moog synthesizer (3)
- Corona – guitar (3, 10)
- Tom Wade-West – French horn (3, 4, 8)
- Michael Armstrong – congas (5, 6, 11)
- Cassie Ramone – backing vocals (5, 6, 11)
- Frankie Rose – backing vocals (5, 6, 11)
- "Kickball Katy" Goodman – backing vocals (5)
- Dallas Green – backing vocals (7)
- Katie Stelmanis – vocals (8)
- Sebastien Grainger – backing vocals (9)

Production

- Jon Drew – producer, recording engineer, sequencing
- Jeremy Scott – recording engineer, backing vocals (5, 6, 11)
- Greg Calbi – mastering
- Mimi Cabell – cover photo
- Jay Gardner – original art
- David Waldman – photos
- Mark Ohe – design (with Fucked Up)
