= David Comes to Life =

Studio album by Fucked Up
- Released: June 6, 2011
- Recorded: Treefort Studios Brooklyn, SMT Studio New York, 6 Nassau Studio Toronto, Central Audio Studio Toronto
- Genres: Hardcore punk, punk rock, indie rock
- Length: 77:47
- Label: Matador
- Producer: Shane Stoneback

Fucked Up chronology
| The Chemistry of Common Life (2008) | David Comes to Life (2011) | Glass Boys (2014) |

David Comes to Life is the third studio album by Canadian hardcore punk band Fucked Up. It was released on June 7, 2011, in North America and June 6, 2011, elsewhere on Matador Records in CD and double LP formats. David Comes to Life is an 18-song epic in four acts. It became Fucked Up's first charting album in the United States ranking at number 83 on the Billboard 200.

The album is a rock opera set in 1970s and 1980s England. The story involves unreliable narrators and meta-narrative plot devices. Drummer Jonah Falco described the album as a love story between the title character David and a girl named Veronica.

== Background and recording ==
David Comes to Life was first announced in March 2010, with guitarist Ben Cook describing the album as a musical. The album began recording in June 2010 in New York City and was finished in February 2011. The day before the album was released, the band took over Clint Roenisch Gallery in Toronto and turn it into a pop-up record shop, where they sold copies of David Comes to Life and 7" singles featuring other songs from the recording session.

The character of David Eliade had appeared in previous Fucked Up songs such as "David Comes to Life" (from Hidden World) and "David's Christmas" (a 2007 single). The reason Fucked Up made the album a rock opera was to contrast rock opera's perception as being indulgent with the rawness of hardcore punk. The music was written before the lyrics or story were written. Damian Abraham called the songs on David Comes to Life the most personal ones yet, saying "[W]e could hide behind characters and pretend that we’re talking about David and Veronica when really we’re talking about my breaking with my girlfriend or something [...] We always wrote about things we’re passionate about, but we’re always writing it in the sort of 'we', 'collective', 'us vs. humanity' type of thing. This time, it was very much like 'Here is what I am going through.' "

On Record Store Day, Fucked Up released David's Town, a compilation of 11 songs purporting to be from bands in Byrdesdale Spa, the fictional town David Comes to Life is set in. Each song on the compilation featured a guest singer (one was sung by Damian Abraham, three were sung by other band members), including Danko Jones, Wesley Patrick Gonzalez, Dan Romano, Simone Schmidt, Cee Kay and Cloud Nothings.

== Story ==
David Eliade is a worker at a light bulb factory in late 70s–early 80s England. David meets Veronica Boisson, an activist, and the two fall in love. Though David enjoys being in a relationship with Veronica, David starts to worry that something wrong is going to happen. The two build a bomb as a form of protest and attempt to bomb the factory. The bomb fails to destroy the factory, however, and ends up killing Veronica in the process. David feels sorrow for spending time with Veronica, thinking that it was all a waste, something the narrator agrees on. David also feels guilty for causing Veronica's death.

The story then introduces an acquaintance of David named Vivian Benson, who tells David to not trust narration. David then realizes that he is a character in a story, being controlled by Octavio St. Laurent, the story's narrator. David and Octavio fight for control over the plot, but David loses the fight and comes out feeling worse.

Vivian then reveals to David that she witnessed the bomb blast, and that Octavio was the cause of Veronica's death. Octavio accepts that having Veronica die was wrong. However, Octavio defends his action, saying that because he was cast as a villain, he was merely doing his job and should not be blamed. Veronica's spirit returns to David and David realizes his time with Veronica was worthwhile. David, glad with his experience, returns to the factory to relive everything again.

== Music videos ==
The first music video from the album, "Queen of Hearts," was released on June 21, 2011. The video, directed by Scott Cudmore and shot in rural Ontario, features a children choir singing the song, with the boys singing Damien Abraham's part while the girls sing Madeline Follin's part.

The second music video from the album, "The Other Shoe," was released on August 16, 2011. The video, directed by Matt Eastman, is set in Byrdesdale, the location of the album's story. The video features the characters David, Veronica and Octavio, as well as the bomb that would eventually kill Veronica. The video also intercuts to footage of the band walking in slow motion.

The third music video from the album, "Turn the Season," was released on December 12, 2011, on Spin's website. The video features a photo shoot with the band intertwined with elements from the David Comes to Life story.

On December 12, 2012, the fourth music video from the album, "Inside a Frame," premiered on Pitchfork.tv.

== Reception ==
Professional ratings
Aggregate scores
| Source | Rating |
|---|---|
| AnyDecentMusic? | 8.0/10 |
| Metacritic | 86/100 |
Review scores
| Source | Rating |
| AllMusic | 4/5 stars |
| The A.V. Club | A |
| Chicago Tribune | 3.5/4 stars |
| The Guardian | 4/5 stars |
| Mojo | 4/5 stars |
| NME | 8/10 |
| Pitchfork | 8.6/10 |
| Q | 4/5 stars |
| Rolling Stone | 3.5/5 stars |
| Spin | 9/10 |

David Comes to Life has received overwhelmingly positive reviews. On the review aggregate Metacritic, the album has a score of 86 out of 100, indicating "Universal acclaim."

The A.V. Club's Steven Hyden gave the album a grade of "A," writing: "For a highfalutin concept record, the component parts of David Comes To Life are downright catchy. They're also bracingly potent and screamingly vital; David Comes To Life is the work of a band openly aspiring to be great, and pulling it off." Brian Raftery of Spin also praised the album, writing "[David Comes to Life] is one of the most overly complicated hard-rock records of the past ten years. It's also one of the best." Pitchfork's Larry Fitzmaurice gave the album a Best New Music designation, commenting on the album's length: "David Comes to Life is absolutely worth the commitment, a convincing demonstration of what can happen when a band works without limitations." AllMusic's Jason Lymangrover wrote "Guest backing vocalists Kurt Vile, Jennifer Castle, and Madeline Follin give the songs a hint of melody, but otherwise, David Comes to Life is the musical equivalent of a bullhorn and a blender, and all the more awesome for it." Consequence of Sound's Adam Kivel, while criticizing the narrative, wrote "The missteps of narrative are easily paved over by the energy, power, and fun of the music. As such, rather than feeling constrained or overwrought, this is a concept album where you can forget the concept for a while and just dive right in."

Tiny Mix Tapes, on the other hand, was more mixed to the album, calling it "an overproduced mess." The review continued: "No matter how loud [Damian Abraham] yells, the music neuters him. Between the overlong, overstuffed songs and arrangements, ridiculous album concept and lyrical conceit, there’s no room left for the vicious, hurtling energy that first impressed me on Hidden World's best songs."

David Comes to Life's second song, Queen of Hearts, was featured as the opening song in a The Campaign Trail mod titled "Obamanation", an incumbency simulator focused on Barack Obama's first term in office set in a universe where the Great Recession occurs under his term and not George W. Bush's.

=== Accolades ===
Spin named David Comes to Life its #1 Album of 2011, writing "Fucked Up have synthesized 40 years of rock into what's ostensibly a hardcore record, and in doing so created its own logic." Popmatters named David Comes to Life the best Canadian album of 2011, writing "Is it intimidating? Sure. However, when you drop the needle and step into the world Fucked Up has created, you understand that limitations are only for those who want them to exist. And anyone who’s spent some time in the Great White North would likely agree." The same website also ranked the album #3 on its list of the 75 best albums of 2011. The Chicago Tribune ranked the album #5 on its list of the top 10 albums of 2011, with Greg Kot calling it "a landmark that transcends the band’s hardcore-punk origins," while The A.V Club named David Comes to Life the second best album of the year. Stereogum placed the album at number 4 on its list of the "Top 50 albums of 2011" while Pitchfork placed the album at number 33 on its list.

The album was named as a shortlisted nominee for the 2012 Polaris Music Prize on June 14, 2012.

Publications' year-end list appearances for David Comes to Life
| Critic/Publication | List | Rank | Ref |
|---|---|---|---|
| The A.V. Club | The A.V. Club's Top 26 Albums of 2011 | 2 | |
| Beats Per Minute | Beats Per Minute's Top 50 Albums of 2011 | 16 | |
| Billboard | Billboard's Top 10 Albums of 2011 | 6 | |
| Consequence of Sound | Consequence of Sound's Top 50 Albums of 2011 | 19 | |
| Drowned in Sound | Drowned in Sound's Top 75 Albums of 2011 | 26 | |
| Magnet | Magnet's Top 20 Albums of 2011 | 11 | |
| MTV | MTV's Top 20 Albums of 2011 | 4 | |
| MusicOMH | MusicOMH's Top 50 Albums of 2011 | 33 | |
| Pazz & Jop | Pazz & Jop's Top Albums of 2011 | 11 | |
| Pitchfork | Pitchfork's Top 50 Albums of 2011 | 33 | |
| PopMatters | PopMatters's Top 75 Albums of 2011 | 3 | |
| Prefix | Prefix's Top 50 Albums of 2011 | 4 | |
| The Quietus | The Quietus' Top 50 Albums of 2011 | 34 | |
| Spin | Spin's Top 50 Albums of 2011 | 1 | |
| Spinner | Spinner's Top 40 Albums of 2011 | 3 | |
| Stereogum | Stereogum's Top 50 Albums of 2011 | 4 | |
| Treble | Treble's Top 50 Albums of 2011 | 24 | |
| Under the Radar | Under the Radar's Top 80 Albums of 2011 | 39 | |

== Track listing ==
All tracks are written by Mike Haliechuk and Fucked Up, with lyrics by Haliechuk, except where noted.

Act One: Love, then tragedy strikes the town.
| No. | Title | Lyrics | Music | Length |
|---|---|---|---|---|
| 1. | "Let Her Rest" | instrumental | Haliechuk | 3:23 |
| 2. | "Queen of Hearts" | Damian Abraham | | 4:36 |
| 3. | "Under My Nose" | Abraham | | 3:29 |
| 4. | "The Other Shoe" | Abraham | | 4:57 |
| 5. | "Turn the Season" | | | 4:02 |

Act Two: David loses Veronica, and then himself, as he succumbs to guilt and despair.
| No. | Title | Lyrics | Music | Length |
|---|---|---|---|---|
| 6. | "Running on Nothing" | Abraham | | 4:46 |
| 7. | "Remember My Name" | | | 5:09 |
| 8. | "A Slanted Tone" | | Fucked Up, Jonah Falco | 3:40 |
| 9. | "Serve Me Right" | | | 3:49 |

Act Three: Another character is revealed, putting the responsibility for Veronica's death into question.
| No. | Title | Lyrics | Music | Length |
|---|---|---|---|---|
| 10. | "Truth I Know" | Abraham | | 4:33 |
| 11. | "Life in Paper" | | Jonah Falco | 4:38 |
| 12. | "Ship of Fools" | | | 4:02 |
| 13. | "A Little Death" | | | 4:36 |

Act Four: A revelation from Vivian sheds more light on Veronica's death; Octavio and Vivian explain their motives, and David is reborn.
| No. | Title | Lyrics | Length |
|---|---|---|---|
| 14. | "I Was There" | | 3:19 |
| 15. | "Inside a Frame" | Abraham | 4:18 |
| 16. | "The Recursive Girl" | | 3:34 |
| 17. | "One More Night" | | 5:36 |
| 18. | "Lights Go Up" | | 5:30 |
| Total length: | | | 77:47 |

== Personnel ==
The following people contributed to David Comes to Life:

Fucked Up

- Pink Eyes (Damian Abraham) – vocals (2–18)
- 10,000 Marbles (Mike Haliechuk) – guitar (1–18); producer; design and layout
- Gulag (Josh Zucker) – guitar (2–10, 12–18); design and layout
- Young Governor (Ben Cook) – guitar (2–10, 12–18), backing vocals (3, 4, 6–8, 10, 13, 15)
- Mustard Gas (Sandy Miranda) – bass (2–10, 12–18); design and layout; front cover, back cover, and gatefold photography
- Mr. Jo (Jonah Falco) – piano (1), organ (1, 4, 6, 7), drums (2–18), guitar (11, 12, 15, 17, 18), bass (11)

Additional musicians

- Madeline Follin – additional vocals (2)
- Jennifer Castle – backing vocals (4, 18), additional vocals (17)
- Kurt Vile – additional vocals (18)

Production

- Shane Stoneback – producer, engineer, mixing
- Lorne Hounsell – engineer
- Jeff McMurrich – engineer
- Brian Hermand – assistant engineer
- Ever Ronquillo – assistant engineer
- Joe LaPorta – mastering
- Emily Lazar – mastering
- Frank Longo – design and layout, lightbulb insert and original artwork
- Dan Gallo – design and layout
- Brian Kelly – design and layout
- Rachel Eliza Carr – live photo
- Jake Giles Netter – live photo
- Hillary Crist, Rochelle Fine, Melanie Hill, Erika Lobko, Ronan O'Leary, Ian Russell, Kate Young, Ken Zucker, Simone Zucker – models

== Charts ==
Chart performance for David Comes to Life
| Chart (2011) | Peak position |
|---|---|
| Canadian Albums (Nielsen SoundScan) | 90 |
| UK Albums (Official Charts) | 152 |
| UK Independent Albums (Official Charts) | 23 |
| UK Rock & Metal Albums (Official Charts) | 7 |
| US Billboard 200 | 83 |
| US Independent Albums (Billboard) | 15 |
| US Indie Store Album Sales (Billboard) | 12 |
| US Top Alternative Albums (Billboard) | 20 |
| US Top Rock Albums (Billboard) | 28 |
