= Jane Doe (2001 film) =

- Genre: Action; Thriller
- Written by: Kevin Elders
- Directed by: Kevin Elders
- Starring: Teri Hatcher; Rob Lowe
- Theme music composer: Brian Tyler
- Country of origin: United States
- Original language: English

Production
- Producers: Steve Richards; Alan Schechter
- Cinematography: Adam Kane
- Editor: Alain Jakubowicz
- Running time: 91 minutes
- Production company: USA Films

Original release
- Network: USA Network
- Release: December 11, 2001

Jane Doe is a 2001 American made-for-television action thriller film starring Teri Hatcher and Rob Lowe directed and written by Kevin Elders. The film premiered on USA Network on December 11, 2001.

== Background ==
Elders had written the script seven years before its release; according to Hatcher, studios were reluctant to pick it up because the lead character was a woman. The filmmakers planned to release Jane Doe abroad in theaters in addition to its USA network premiere

== Plot summary ==
Jane Doe (Hatcher) is the real name of arms manufacturer Cy-Kor's recently fired security password employee with top clearance, whose teenage son Michael (Trevor Blumas) is kidnapped. She obeys the bizarre instructions, including getting and learning to use a gun and downloading a secret file (after which her work post starts totally deleting), dumping both in a dumpster and waiting nearby, only to witness the company's CEO Churnings being shot by a sniper using an identical weapon. Michael is released, but the pair is now wanted for the murder and both are abducted by armed men, who bring them to a ranch. There they are welcomed by Michael's father, David Doe (Lowe), who discloses to be an agent of the Defense Intelligence Agency (DIA), and so is Michael, who used her clearance as the whole thing is a sting for the kidnapping and murder's brain, Avery (Mark Caven) so he will sell the enemy false data. However, David's DIA-partner Kurt Simmons and their boss Phelps have a dirty agenda.

== Critical reception ==
Jane Doe received primarily poor reviews. The San Francisco Chronicle called the film a "frenetic failure." The New York Daily News wrote that the plot was "full of holes" and that the acting and special effects were poor. The South Florida Sun-Sentinel said the film "relies solely on star power to attract and hold an audience."
