= Year of the Dragon (song) =

Single by Fucked Up
- Released: April 15, 2014
- Recorded: April 22-30, 2013; July 7-14, 2013; July 21-27, 2013; September 30-October 5, 2013
- Studio: Electrical Audio, Chicago, Illinois; Key Club Studio, Benton Harbor, Michigan; Candle Recording Studio
- Length: 18:02
- Label: Tankcrimes

Fucked Up Zodiac series singles chronology
"Year of the Tiger" (2012)	"Year of the Dragon" (2014)	"Year of the Hare" (2015)

Year of the Dragon is a single by Canadian punk band Fucked Up. It is part of the band’s long-running Zodiac singles series.

The title track runs 18 minutes and 2 seconds in length.

== Background ==
"Year of the Dragon" was debuted live by Fucked Up during a performance at (Le) Poisson Rouge in New York City on September 28, 2013.

The single was released on April 15, 2014, through Tankcrimes.

== Track listing ==
No.	Title	Length
1.	"Year of the Dragon"	18:02
2.	"I Wanna Be a Yank" (The Cardboard Brains cover)	2:33
3.	"Disorder" (The Ugly cover)	2:00

== Artwork and packaging ==
The release features cover artwork by Andrei Bouzikov and includes a bonus seven-inch flexi disc with a six-minute edited version of the title track.

== Personnel ==
Credits adapted from the album's liner notes.

- Damian Abraham - vocals
- Mike Haliechuk, Jonah Falco, Josh Zucker, Ben Cook - guitar
- Sandy Miranda – bass
- Jonah Falco – drums and percussion
- Bill Skibbe – recording
- Leon Taheny – recording and mixing
- Alex Gamble – recording
- Jonny Schenke – mastering
- Andrei Bouzikov – cover artwork
