= Hidden World (album) =

Studio album by Fucked Up
- Released: October 10, 2006
- Recorded: 2006
- Genre: Hardcore punk, experimental rock, psychedelia, punk rock
- Length: 72:33
- Label: Jade Tree
- Producer: Jon Drew

Fucked Up chronology
Hidden World (2006)	The Chemistry of Common Life (2008)

Professional ratings
Aggregate scores
Source	Rating
Metacritic	73/100
Review scores
Source	Rating
NOW Magazine	4/5 stars
Playlouder	4/5 stars
SPIN	4/5 stars
Pitchfork	7.5/10
AllMusic	3/5 stars

Hidden World is the debut studio album by Canadian hardcore punk band Fucked Up. It was released on double vinyl by Deranged Records and on CD by Jade Tree. It is the band's first long-play record. Hidden World was picked as #1 punk album of the year by Canadian magazine Exclaim! and was also nominated for the 2007 PLUG Independent Music Awards Punk Album of the Year.

== Releases ==
October 9, 2006 - On Jade Tree, CD
October 2006 - On Deranged Records, vinyl (double LP)
February 2007 - On Welfare Records, 8-Track (Limited to 75 copies)
September 7, 2013 - On Sexbeat Records, cassette

== Track listing ==
CD/digital release

All tracks are written by Fucked Up. All lyrics by Damian Abraham, except where noted.

No.	Title	Lyrics	Length
1.	"Crusades"	Mike Haliechuk, Abraham	6:43
2.	"David Comes to Life"		2:20
3.	"Invisible Leader"		4:30
4.	"Carried Out to the Sea"		3:11
5.	"Baiting the Public"	Haliechuk	5:56
6.	"Fate of Fates"		6:06
7.	"Two Snakes"	Haliechuk, Abraham	7:17
8.	"Hidden World"	Haliechuk, Abraham	5:44
9.	"Manqueller Man"	Haliechuk, Abraham	4:16
10.	"Blaze of Glory"		5:10
11.	"Triumph of Life"	Haliechuk	6:02
12.	"Jacobs Ladder"		5:50
13.	"Vivian Girls"	Haliechuk, Abraham	9:26

Vinyl release

- Side A: 1–4
- Side B: 5–7
- Side C: 8–10
- Side D: 11–13

== Art ==
The cover art shows a goddess rising above a river and the field of snakes. Another piece of art in the booklet shows these snakes emerging from a giant tentacle/Cornucopia. It also features many sigils. The album's logo is Vesica piscis, or Venn diagram of two sets, presumably the real world and the hidden world. It was illustrated by Jason Gardner of Buckland, Massachusetts.

== Personnel ==
Fucked Up

- Pink Eyes (Damian Abraham) – vocals
- 10,000 Marbles (Mike Haliechuk) – guitar; backing vocals (1, 4), second vocal (2), tambourine (2), organ (5), whistle (8), mandolin (11), additional vocals (11)
- Concentration Camp (Josh Zucker) – guitar; backing vocals (4), piano (11)
- Mustard Gas (Sandy Miranda) – bass; backing vocals (4), drums (5), marimba (5)
- Mr. Jo (Jonah Falco) – drums (1–4, 6–13), backing vocals (1, 4), second vocal (2), additional guitar (4, 5, 8, 10, 13), strings (11), additional vocals (11)

Additional musicians

- Heidi Hazelton – second vocal (1), whisper (10), additional vocal (13)
- Lloyd in the Void – backing vocals (1)
- Owen Pallett – violin (4, 7, 11), organ (7)
- Ben Cook – additional vocals (9)
- Chris Colohan – additional vocals (10)
- Terrence of Life – viola (11)
- The Wavy Originals – backing vocals (12)
- George Pettit – backing vocals (13)

Production

- Jon Drew – producer, recording engineer, mixing, sequencing
- Alan Douches – mastering
- Simon Wilkinson – design
- Jay Gardner – original art, sigil illustration
- Halie C. Michaelian – sigil illustration
- Mimi Cabell – photography
