= Central de Trabajadores Democráticos =

CTD
- Central de Trabajadores Democráticos
- Founded: 1980s
- Headquarters: San Salvador, El Salvador
- Location: El Salvador
- Affiliations: ITUC

Central de Trabajadores Democráticos (CTD) is a trade union centre in El Salvador. It was founded in the 1980s, and is affiliated with the International Trade Union Confederation.
