= Epics in Minutes =

Epics In Minutes

Compilation album by Fucked Up
- Released: March 16, 2004
- Genre: Hardcore punk
- Length: 62:56
- Label: Deranged Records

Epics In Minutes is a compilation of singles by the band Fucked Up released March 16, 2004 on Deranged Records. The band states in the liner notes that “this is the closest that there will ever be to a Fucked Up retrospective.” Some of the versions on this compilation are different from the ones that were originally released on the singles.

== Track listing ==
No.	Title	Length
1.	"Color Removal"	2:08
2.	"What Could've Been"	2:52
3.	"Baiting the Public I"	2:51
4.	"Baiting the Public II"	2:20
5.	"Last Man Standing"	1:59
6.	"Litany"	2:04
7.	"Police"	2:40
8.	"Circling the Drain"	2:36
9.	"Reset the Ride"	2:41
10.	"A Light That Never Comes On"	1:39
11.	"Generation+Red"	4:16
12.	"Dance of Death"	3:47
13.	"CIUT Radio Session"	5:38
14.	"The Lurking Fear (Demo)"	2:00
15.	"Circling the Drain (Demo)"	1:39
16.	"The Achilles List (Demo)"	1:05
17.	"Sleep Tight (Demo)"	1:14
18.	"Sirens (Demo)"	1:57
19.	"Piece by Piece (Demo)"	1:40
20.	"Following (Demo)"	1:37
21.	"Land of Nod (Demo)"	14:13
Total length:		62:56
