= One Day (Fucked Up album) =

Studio album by Fucked Up
- Released: January 27, 2023
- Recorded: December 2019–February 2020
- Studios: Candle Studios (Toronto); The Stationhouse (Armley); Palmer Stone (Toronto)
- Length: 40:00
- Label: Merge
- Producer: Mike Haliechuk

Fucked Up chronology
Dose Your Dreams (2018)	One Day (2023)	Another Day (2024)

Singles from One Day
- 1. "Huge New Her" Released: September 15, 2022; 2. "One Day" Released: October 25, 2022; 3. "Found" Released: November 15, 2022; 4. "I Think I Might Be Weird" Released: January 11, 2023

One Day is the sixth studio album by Canadian post-hardcore band Fucked Up. The album was released on January 27, 2023, through Merge Records, four years after their previous album Dose Your Dreams.

Four singles were released ahead of the album's release: "Huge New Her", the self-titled track and "Found", which were released in late 2022, and "I Think I Might Be Weird", which came out in early 2023.

One Day was well received by contemporary music critics, with the album enjoying "universal acclaim" on Metacritic and AnyDecentMusic.

== Background ==
The recording process of the album took over the course of three years, in part due to the impact of the COVID-19 pandemic on the music industry. The guitars of the album were recorded one day December 2019 at Candle Studios in Toronto, while the bass and vocals were recorded in February 2020 at Palmer Stone Studios and Candle Stone Studios, respectively.

Due to the COVID-19 pandemic, the final mixing and mastering did not occur until April 2022. Mixing was undertaken by Alex Gamble while mastering was undertaken by Heba Kadry. Bandmember Mike Haliechuk undertook production.

== Promotion and release ==
=== Singles ===
Four singles were released in promotion of the album. The first track, "Huge New Her," was released as a 7-inch single in September 2022. The self-titled track came out on October 25, 2022. On November 15, 2022, the band released the third single, "Found". The final single, "I Think I Might Be Weird," came out on January 11, 2023.

== Track listing ==
All lyrics are written by Mike Haliechuk, except where noted; all music is composed by Damian Abraham, Jonah Falco, Mike Haliechuk, Sandy Miranda, Josh Zucker.

One Day track listing
No.	Title	Lyrics	Length
1.	"Found"		3:50
2.	"I Think I Might Be Weird"		3:18
3.	"Huge New Her"		4:18
4.	"Lords of Kensington"	Abraham	4:08
5.	"Broken Little Boys"	Abraham	2:47
6.	"Nothing's Immortal"	Abraham	3:00
7.	"Falling Right Under"	Abraham	4:22
8.	"One Day"		5:03
9.	"Cicada"		4:29
10.	"Roar"	Abraham	4:45
Total length:			40:00

== Personnel ==
Fucked Up

- Damian Abraham – lead vocals (tracks 1–8, 10)
- Jonah Falco – drums, background vocals
- Mike Haliechuk – guitars, background vocals, production (all tracks); lead vocals (9), art direction
- Sandy Miranda – bass guitar, engineering
- Josh Zucker

Additional contributors

- Heba Kadry – mastering
- Alex Gamble – mixing, engineering
- Dylan Frankland – engineering
- James Atkinson – engineering
- Daniel Murphy – design, cover art, layout
- Jeff Bierk – photography, back cover photo
- Andrei Dornovitiy – photography
- Jeaninne Kaufer – photography
- Kirsten Thoen – photography
- Vanessa Heins – photography
