= 2009 Polaris Music Prize =

Annual Canadian music award ceremony

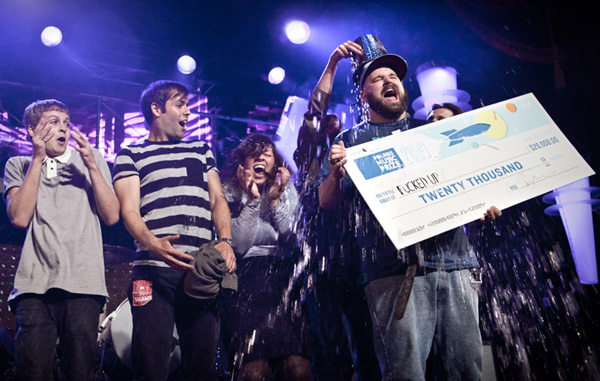
Fucked Up at the 2009 Polaris Music Prize gala

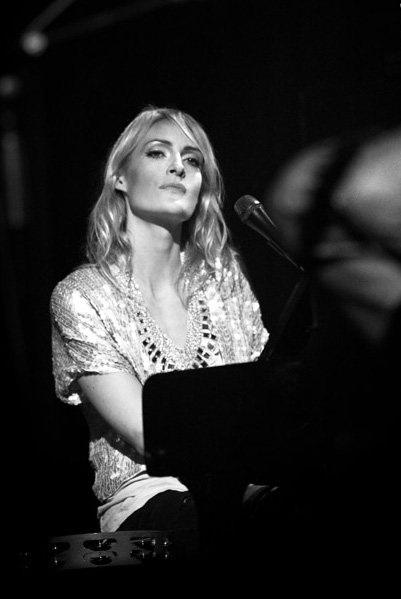
Metric's Emily Haines at the 2009 Polaris Music Prize gala

The 2009 edition of the Canadian Polaris Music Prize was presented on September 21, 2009 in Toronto at the Masonic Temple and broadcast live online for the first time in its short history. The award's eligibility period for 2009 covered albums released between June 1, 2008 and May 31, 2009.

Initial coverage of the award's shortlist noted that six of the ten finalists were repeat nominees. K'naan, Malajube and Metric were all finalists in the 2006 shortlist, while Joel Plaskett, Chad VanGaalen and Patrick Watson were all part of the 2007 award, which Watson won. It was the first time in the award's four-year history that any artist was named to the shortlist for a second time.

== Winner ==
Toronto hardcore punk band Fucked Up won with their second album, The Chemistry of Common Life, which despite being controversial, received a great deal of acclaim when it was released in October 2008.

== Shortlist ==
The prize's 10-album shortlist was announced on July 7, 2009.

- Fucked Up, The Chemistry of Common Life
- Elliott Brood, Mountain Meadows
- Great Lake Swimmers, Lost Channels
- Hey Rosetta!, Into Your Lungs (and around in your heart and on through your blood)
- K'naan, Troubadour
- Malajube, Labyrinthes
- Metric, Fantasies
- Joel Plaskett, Three
- Chad VanGaalen, Soft Airplane
- Patrick Watson, Wooden Arms

== Longlist ==
The prize's preliminary 40-album longlist was announced on June 15, 2009.

- Arkells, Jackson Square
- Jill Barber, Chances
- Beast, Beast
- Bell Orchestre, As Seen Through Windows
- Bison B.C., Quiet Earth
- Bruce Peninsula, A Mountain is a Mouth
- Cœur de pirate, Cœur de pirate
- Leonard Cohen, Live in London
- D-Sisive, Let the Children Die
- Elephant Stone, The Seven Seas
- Elliott Brood, Mountain Meadows
- Fucked Up, The Chemistry of Common Life
- Great Lake Swimmers, Lost Channels
- Handsome Furs, Face Control
- Tim Hecker, An Imaginary Country
- Hey Rosetta!, Into Your Lungs (and around in your heart and on through your blood)
- Japandroids, Post-Nothing
- Junior Boys, Begone Dull Care
- K'naan, Troubadour
- k-os, Yes!
- La Patère Rose, La patère rose
- Land of Talk, Some Are Lakes
- Lhasa, Lhasa
- Malajube, Labyrinthes
- Metric, Fantasies
- One Hundred Dollars, Forest of Tears
- Pink Mountaintops, Outside Love
- Joel Plaskett, Three
- Snailhouse, Lies on the Prize
- Charles Spearin, The Happiness Project
- Rae Spoon, superioryouareinferior
- The Stills, Oceans Will Rise
- Think About Life, Family
- Timber Timbre, Timber Timbre
- Chad VanGaalen, Soft Airplane
- Martha Wainwright, I Know You're Married But I've Got Feelings Too
- Patrick Watson, Wooden Arms
- Wolf Parade, At Mount Zoomer
- Women, Women
- Woodpigeon, Treasury Library Canada

== Sponsors ==
Sirius Satellite Radio, which had been a supporting sponsor and broadcaster of the awards since their inception, became a primary presenting sponsor of the awards in 2009.

== Media ==
In addition to being broadcast live on CBC Radio 3, the 2009 ceremony was also webcast on MuchMusic's website, as well as produced for later broadcast on MuchMusic.

== Jury ==
The Polaris Music Prize blog began announcing the 2009 jurors one by one in late June 2009. Announced jurors included Corus Entertainment radio programmer Alan Cross, music blogger Bryan Acker (Herohill) and newspaper music critics Sue Carter Flinn (The Coast), Peter Hemminger (FFWD), Serge Paradis (Ici), Stuart Derdeyn (Vancouver Province) and Brendan Murphy (Hour).
