= Dose Your Dreams =

Studio album by Fucked Up
- Released: October 5, 2018
- Recorded: Spring 2018
- Studios: Union Sound Company, The Hive, and Candle Recording; Toronto
- Length: 82:15
- Label: Merge
- Producers: Mike Haliechuk; Jonah Falco

Fucked Up chronology
Glass Boys (2014)	Dose Your Dreams (2018)	One Day (2023)

Singles from Dose Your Dreams
- 1. "Raise Your Voice Joyce" Released: July 23, 2018; 2. "Normal People" Released: August 15, 2018; 3. "House of Keys" Released: September 10, 2018; 4. "Dose Your Dreams / Accelerate" Released: September 27, 2018

Dose Your Dreams is the fifth studio album by Canadian hardcore punk band Fucked Up. The album was released on October 5, 2018, through Merge Records.

The four-year gap between the album and their 2014 album, Glass Boys, marked the longest gap in studio albums in the band's history. This was the band's last album with guitarist Ben Cook before his departure in 2021.

== Accolades ==
The album was shortlisted for the Juno Award for Alternative Album of the Year at the Juno Awards of 2019.

Publication	Accolade	Rank	Ref.
Earbuddy	Top 50 Albums of 2018	24	
Kerrang!	Top 50 Albums of 2018	14	
Stereogum	Top 50 Albums of 2018	25	
Under the Radar	Top 100 Albums of 2018	44	

== Critical reception ==
Professional ratings
Aggregate scores
Source	Rating
AnyDecentMusic?	8.2/10
Metacritic	83/100
Review scores
Source	Rating
AllMusic	4/5 stars
Exclaim!	9/10
The Guardian	5/5 stars
Mojo	4/5 stars
NME	4/5 stars
The Observer	3/5 stars
Pitchfork	7.3/10
Q	4/5 stars
Rolling Stone	3/5 stars
Uncut	8/10

Dose Your Dreams received critical acclaim upon its release. On Metacritic, a review aggregate website, contemporary music critics gave Dose Your Dreams an average score of 83 out of 100, indicating "universal acclaim" based on 23 critic scores. On review aggregator AnyDecentMusic?, the album received a score of 8.2 out of 10 based on 22 reviews.

== Track listing ==
All lyrics are written by Mike Haliechuk (with lyrical consultation by Maggie Macdonald); all music is composed by Mike Haliechuk, except where noted.

Disc one
No.	Title	Music	Vocals	Length
1.	"None of Your Business Man"		Damian Abraham; Amy Gottung	5:18
2.	"Raise Your Voice Joyce"	Haliechuk, Falco	Abraham; Jen Calleja; Jonah Falco	2:47
3.	"Tell Me What You See"	Haliechuk, Falco	Abraham; Calleja; Falco	3:26
4.	"Normal People"	Haliechuk, Falco	Abraham; Falco; Gottung; Mike Haliechuk; John Southworth	5:46
5.	"Torch to Light"		Abraham; Gottung; Ruby Mariani	4:41
6.	"Talking Pictures"		Abraham; Falco; Gottung	6:17
7.	"House of Keys"		Abraham	3:08
8.	"Dose Your Dreams"		Abraham; Haliechuk; Ayo Leilani	5:30

Disc two
No.	Title	Music	Vocals	Length
9.	"Living in a Simulation"	Haliechuk, Falco	Abraham; Falco	3:13
10.	"I Don't Wanna Live in This World Anymore"		Abraham; Falco; Gottung; Haliechuk; Southworth	5:20
11.	"How to Die Happy"		Alice Hansen; Haliechuk	4:52
12.	"Two I's Closed"	Haliechuk, Falco	Falco	2:30
13.	"The One I Want Will Come for Me"		Haliechuk; Falco	5:23
14.	"Mechanical Bull"		Abraham; Ryan Tong	4:32
15.	"Accelerate"	Haliechuk, Falco	Abraham; Ben Cook; Haliechuk	5:30
16.	"Came Down Wrong"	Haliechuk, Falco	Jennifer Castle; Jeremy Gaudet; Joseph Mascis	3:45
17.	"Love Is an Island in the Sea"	Haliechuk, Falco	Falco	2:26
18.	"Joy Stops Time"	Haliechuk, Falco	Abraham; Miya Folick; Lido Pimienta; Mary Margaret O'Hara	7:51

== Personnel ==
Fucked Up

- Damian Abraham – lead vocals (tracks 1–10, 14, 15, 18)
- Mike Haliechuk – guitar (all tracks), bass guitar (1, 2, 8), keyboards (5, 6, 11, 12, 16–18), lead vocals (8, 13), additional vocals (4, 10, 11, 15); synth and drum programming; production
- Sandy Miranda – bass guitar (3–7, 9–11, 13, 16, 18); bass engineering (3–7, 9, 10, 13, 16, 18)
- Jonah Falco – drums (all tracks), guitar (all tracks), piano (1, 16, 18), lead vocals (12, 17), additional vocals (2–4, 6, 9, 10, 13); production (2–4, 9, 12, 15–18); vocal engineering (2–6, 9, 10, 12, 13, 17)
- Ben Cook – lead vocals (15)
- Josh Zucker

Additional musicians

- Alice Hansen – lead vocals (11)
- Ryan Tong – lead vocals (14)
- Jennifer Castle – lead vocals (16)
- Miya Folick – lead vocals (18)
- Amy Gottung – additional vocals (1, 4–6, 10)
- Jen Calleja – additional vocals (2, 3)
- John Southworth – additional vocals (4, 10)
- Ruby Mariani – additional vocals (5)
- Ayo Leilani – additional vocals (8)
- J Mascis – additional vocals (16)
- Jeremy Gaudet – additional vocals (16)
- Mary Margaret O'Hara – additional vocals (18)
- Lido Pimienta – additional vocals (18)
- Jane Fair – saxophone (1, 2, 4, 9, 10)
- Yoobin Ahn – violin (1)
- Owen Pallett – viola, viola arrangement (7, 8, 18)

Technical

- Alex Gamble – engineering (all tracks), mixing (12, 16, 17)
- Bill Skibbe – guitar engineering (11)
- Shane Stoneback – mixing (1–3, 6–10, 13, 18)
- Leon Taheny – mixing (4, 11)
- Matty Tavares – mixing (5)
- Orphx – mixing (14)
- Graham Walsh – mixing (15)
- Greg Calbi – mastering

Visuals

- Eric Kostiuk Williams – cover art
- Kevin McCaughey – additional art, design
- Daniel Murphy – additional art, design

== Charting ==
Chart (2018)	Peak position
Scottish Albums (Official Charts)	80
