= Glass Boys =

Album by Fucked Up

Studio album by Fucked Up
- Released: June 3, 2014
- Recorded: Electrical Audio, Chicago; Key Club, Benton Harbor; Candle Recording, Toronto, Ontario
- Genre: Hardcore punk, punk rock, indie rock
- Length: 42:22
- Label: Matador
- Producer: Bill Skibbe, Mike Haliechuk, Jonah Falco

Fucked Up chronology
David Comes to Life (2011)	Glass Boys (2014)	Dose Your Dreams (2018)

Professional ratings
Aggregate scores
Source	Rating
Metacritic	79/100
Review scores
Source	Rating
AllMusic	4.5/5 stars
Clash	7/10
Consequence of Sound	B+
DIY	4/5 stars
Drowned in Sound	8/10

Glass Boys is the fourth full-length studio album from the Canadian hardcore punk band Fucked Up. It was released on June 3, 2014, by Matador Records. The album deals with themes of growing old in the punk scene while trying to stay true to one's youthful ideals.

== Track listing ==
All lyrics are written by Mike Haliechuk, except where noted; all music is composed by Fucked Up.

No.	Title	Lyrics	Length
1.	"Echo Boomer"		5:07
2.	"Touch Stone"		3:20
3.	"Sun Glass"		3:24
4.	"The Art of Patrons"	Damian Abraham	3:48
5.	"Warm Change"		5:06
6.	"Paper the House"	Abraham	3:50
7.	"DET"	Abraham	3:50
8.	"Led by Hand"	Abraham	3:57
9.	"The Great Divide"	Abraham	3:50
10.	"Glass Boys"		6:18

== Personnel ==
Fucked Up

- Damian Abraham – vocals (all)
- Mike Haliechuk – guitar (all), piano (1), Mellotron (1), bass (1, 5, 7); producer; art and design
- Josh Zucker – guitar (all), Mellotron (2)
- Ben Cook – guitar (2–4, 6, 8–10), additional vocals (4, 6, 10)
- Sandy Miranda – bass (2–4, 6, 8–10); art and design
- Jonah Falco – drums; organ (1, 5), additional vocals (3, 4, 6, 10), piano (5, 7, 10); producer; art and design

Additional musicians

- Gord Downie – additional vocals (4)
- J Mascis – additional vocals (8)
- George Pettit – additional vocals (9)

Production

- Bill Skibbe – producer, recording engineer, mixing
- Leon Taheny – engineer
- Josh Korody – some vocals recording engineer
- Jon Drew – additional drums recording engineer
- Nathan Carter Moore – editing
- Bernie Grundman – mastering
- Mike Zimmerman – art and design
- Stephen McGill – photography
- Gretchen Robinette – photography
- Amanda Fotes – photography

== Charts ==
Chart	Peak position
US Billboard 200	84
US Independent Albums (Billboard)	14
US Top Alternative Albums (Billboard)	17
US Top Hard Rock Albums (Billboard)	1
US Top Rock Albums (Billboard)	20
US Vinyl Albums (Billboard)	5
