= Damian Abraham =

Canadian musician and presenter

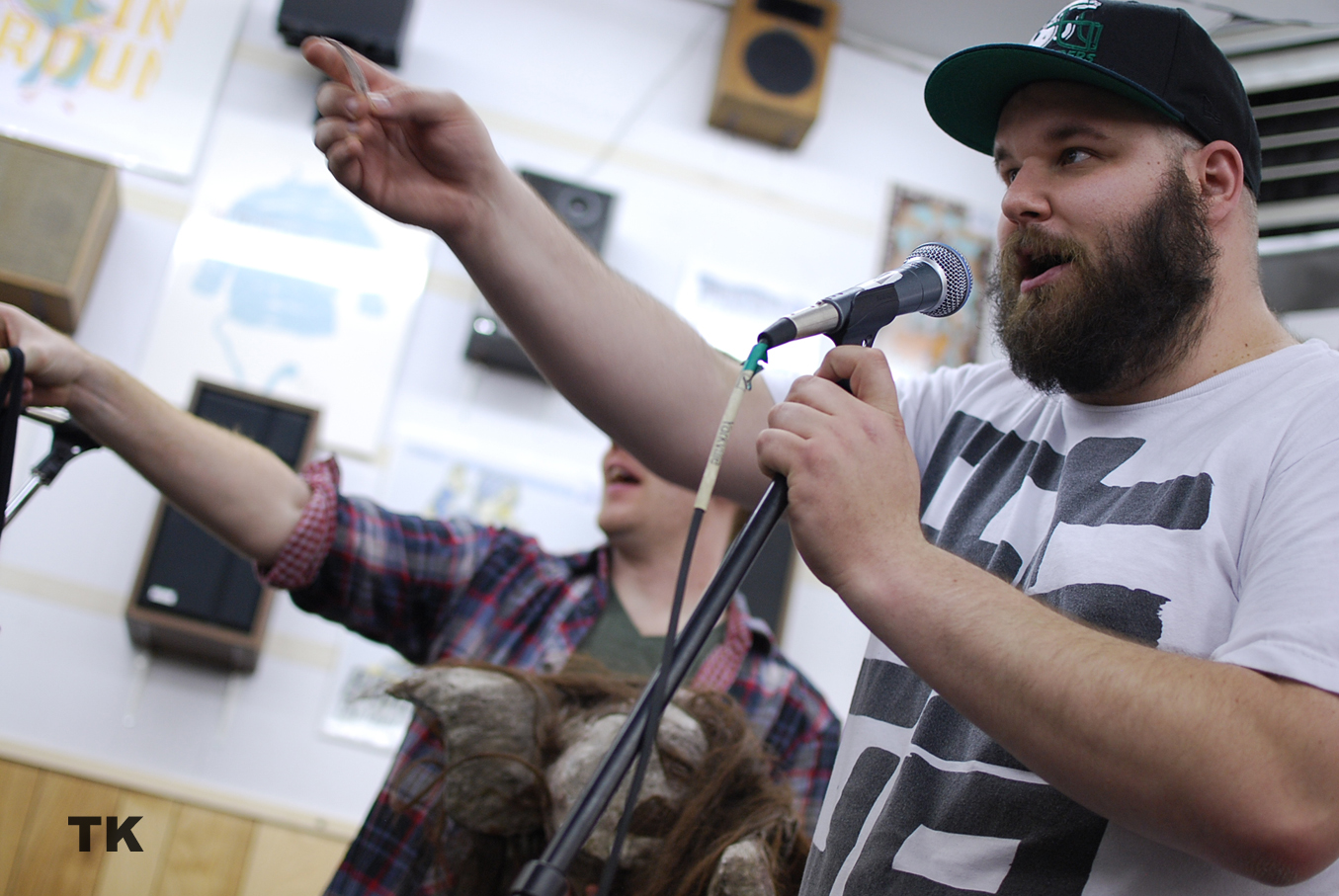
- Damian Abraham in 2010

Background information
- Born: 16 September 1979 (age 46); Toronto, Ontario
- Genres: Punk rock
- Occupations: Singer, podcast host
- Years active: 2001–present
- Member of: Fucked Up
- Website: www.damianabraham.com

Damian Abraham (also known as Father Damian, Pink Eyes and Mr. Damian) is a Canadian musician and presenter who first came to prominence as the vocalist for the band Fucked Up.

== Career ==
Abraham formed Fucked Up in Toronto in 2001. The band has released nine studio albums as of 2024, numerous singles, and was the winner of the 2009 Polaris Music Prize. On several occasions Abraham has joined Dinosaur Jr. for guest vocals when they have appeared live in Toronto.

In 2009, Abraham was invited to become a regular guest as a leftist counterpart on the Fox News show Red Eye w/ Greg Gutfeld, which he had previously appeared on twice. He turned them down.

Since 2014, he has hosted his own podcast Turned Out A Punk.

Between 2011 and its cancellation in 2014 he hosted The Wedge on MuchMusic.

In 2018 he featured in Vice series The Wrestlers which follows him around the US, Mexico, Japan, and other countries in pursuit of the best the world has to offer.

== Personal life ==
Since September 2006, Abraham has been married to Lauren Moses-Brettler. The couple appeared on a reality television show called Newly Wed, Nearly Dead. They have three children and live in Toronto.
