= Fucked Up =

Canadian hardcore punk band

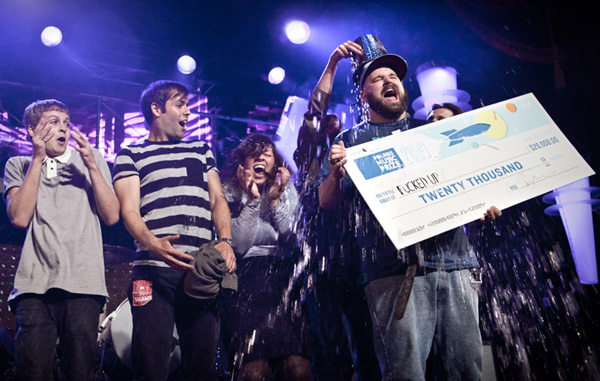
- Fucked Up receiving the 2009 Polaris Music Prize

Background information
- Origin: Toronto, Ontario, Canada
- Genres: Hardcore punk; experimental rock; indie rock; post-hardcore
- Years active: 2001–present
- Labels: Arts & Crafts (Canada), Matador, Deranged Records, Jade Tree, Get Better Records
- Members: Mike Haliechuk; Sandy Miranda; Josh Zucker; Damian Abraham; Jonah Falco
- Past members: Ben Cook; Chris Colohan
- Website: fuckedup.cc

Fucked Up are a Canadian hardcore punk band from Toronto, Ontario, formed in 2001. The band consists of guitarists Mike Haliechuk and Josh Zucker, bassist Sandy Miranda, lead vocalist Damian Abraham, and drummer Jonah Falco. From 2007 to 2021, the band also included guitarist and vocalist Ben Cook.

To date, the band has released nine studio albums, alongside numerous EPs, singles, and companion releases. The band won the 2009 Polaris Music Prize for their second studio album, The Chemistry of Common Life.

The band are known for releasing concept albums, which often feature recurring themes and characters. In 2023, the band began releasing a series of albums in which each member recorded their parts within the span of one day. Alongside their regular studio albums and EPs, the band has an ongoing series of releases based on the Chinese Zodiac, which often take the form of full albums and EPs. To date, there have been nine installments of the Zodiac series, released between 2006 and 2021, with ten-part finale set to be released across 2025 and 2026.

== History ==
=== Early career: 2001–2007 ===
The band formed and played their first shows in early 2001. The initial practicing lineup consisted of lead guitarist Mike Haliechuk (using the alias 10,000 Marbles), vocalist Josh Zucker (alias Concentration Camp), bassist Sandy Miranda (alias Mustard Gas) and drummer Chris Colohan of Left For Dead/The Swarm fame and Cursed. Just prior to recording their demo tape, vocal duties were taken over by Pink Eyes (Damian Abraham, also known as Mr. Damian) while Zucker moved to guitar. Drums were played by Mr. Jo (Jonah Falco, also credited as G. Beat or J. Falco).

Following the release of the demo, the band embarked on a long series of 7-inch records. The band released the "No Pasaran" 7-inch in May 2002. The Police 7-inch was released in March 2003, quickly followed the Baiting the Public 7-inch in May 2003. Two more 7-inches followed in 2004, the single "Dance of Death", and the 4-song EP Litany. The vinyl releases to this point were collected on 2004s Epics in Minutes CD. The band was the subject of a two-minute 16 mm film showing its links to the Toronto hardcore scene, a local infoshop and punk radio show.

The band's use of imagery and symbolism (notable the use of Sigils) took a decided turn after the release of Epics in Minutes, as it was followed by two limited 12-inches, the Looking for Gold 12-inch, and the live Let Likes be Cured by Likes 12-inch. The Looking for Gold 12-inch contained no liner notes or credits, no song titles, and a hidden track. It was self-released by the band in 2004 in two limited runs of 300 and 400 copies. The title track was 16 minutes long, used 18 guitar tracks, had a three-minute drum solo and contained 5 minutes of whistling.

In the summer of 2004, the band released the Generation 7-inch and 12-inch EPs. After touring for most of 2005 the band took on David Eliade as a quasi-full-time manager/promoter. In early 2006 Eliade began shopping demos of songs from the planned Hidden World album to labels, ending with the band signing to Jade Tree Records for an early fall 2006 release of the album. Jade Tree is distributed by Touch & Go which in turn has a distribution agreement with ADA (Warner Music Group). Jade Tree licensed the vinyl version to Deranged Records, which released it as a double album in November 2006.

Several other records, such as Year of the Dog 12-inch were released, before the band went on the European tour, visiting England, Germany, and Spain, among other places. January 16, 2007, marked the band's live television debut on MTV Live, where they were introduced as "Effed Up". During their performance of their song "Baiting the Public", the majority of the audience were moshing and causing damage to the set (also visible was a cut on Damian's forehead), resulting in a sum of $2,000 in damages. This performance sparked controversy and resulted in MTV Canada banning moshing from future MTV Live performances. In November 2007, the band played a show in New York that was filmed for the movie Burn, directed by Richard Roepnack. The performance was positively reviewed in The New York Times, although the Times chose not to print the band's name, referring to them instead as a string of asterisks.

=== 2008–2022 ===
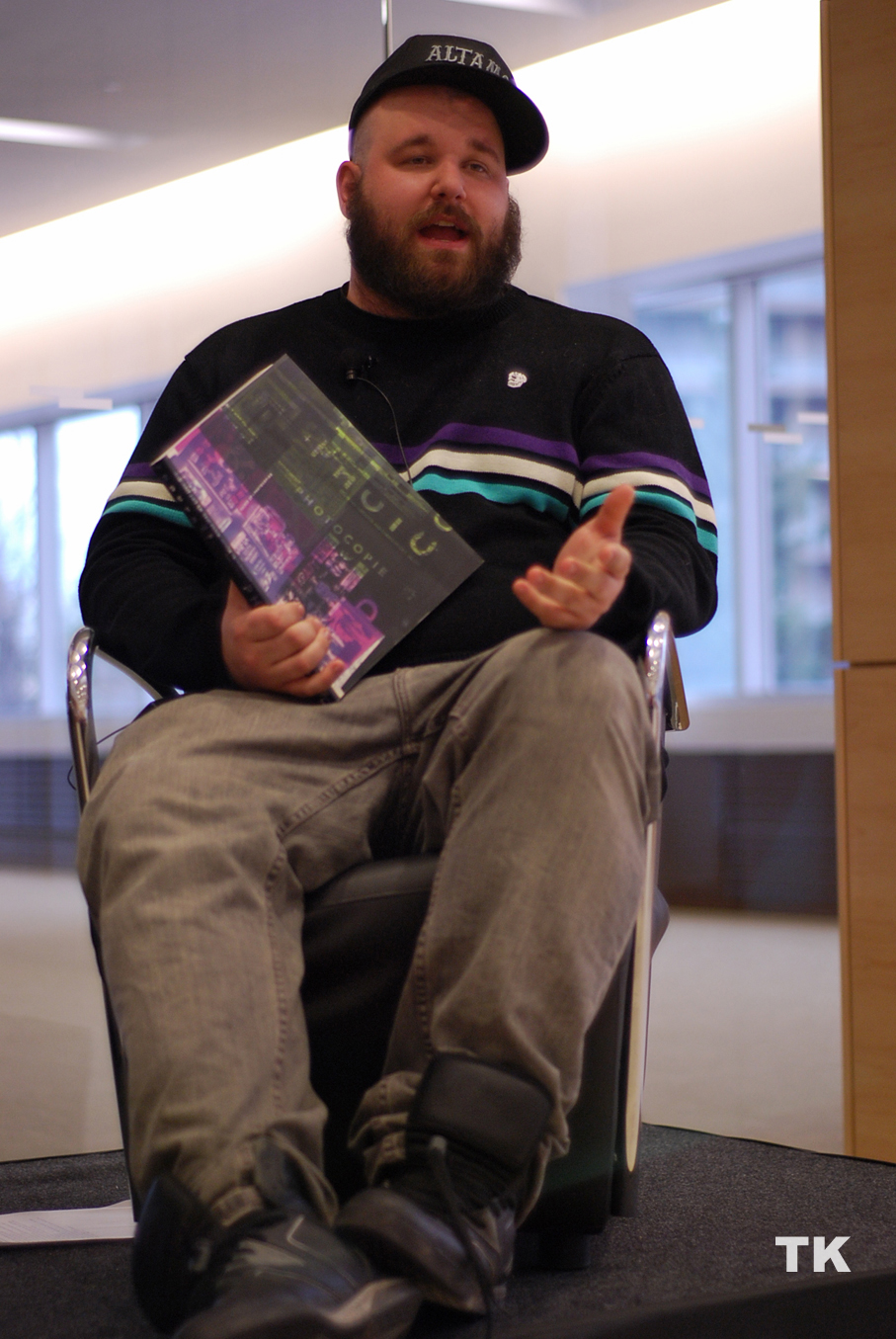
Abraham at an April 2010 literacy event

On October 9, 2008, the band returned to MTV Live, this time performing in the men's washroom. Once again, the band (and their fans) caused a large amount of damage, destroying the ceiling, spray painting walls and knocking over amps and a motorcycle which was brought into the washroom as a prop. Fans, who were told beforehand to stay out of the washroom and to watch from outside the door, rushed the doors and joined in the destruction the band had already started. The band was supposed to play three songs but were stopped after the first song as MTV was not aware of the destruction the band had planned and were concerned about the safety of the band, audience and crew. On October 10, Abraham blogged about the performance on the MTV Live website, saying the bathroom performance was "f**king out of control terrifying."

The band signed to Matador Records in Spring of 2008. That summer, Matador reissued the "Year Of The Pig" 12-inch single. This time it came out with additional formats including a series of three 7-inches, for the US, UK and Japan respectively, each with a different edit of the A-side and a new B-side. A CDEP compiled all the versions from the various vinyl versions. The band toured extensively in the UK behind this release, following it with a trip up the West Coast.

On October 7, 2008, Matador released Fucked Up's second album, The Chemistry Of Common Life. The album received near-universal critical acclaim from publications such as the NME, The New York Times, Blender, Pitchfork, Alternative Press, Q Magazine, and would later go on to win the 2009 Polaris Music Prize. The band toured the Eastern US in October, including a much-covered 12-hour long show on the Bowery in New York on October 14. They were joined by musical guests including Ezra Koenig of Vampire Weekend, Moby, John Joseph of the Cro-Mags, members of Endless Boogie, Les Savy Fav, Dinosaur Jr., and others.

In November 2008, the band participated with other similarly named bands, including Holy Fuck, Fuck, and Fuck Buttons in the Festival of the Fuck Bands music festival in the village of Fucking, Austria. In 2009 Fucked Up took part in an interactive documentary series called City Sonic. The series, which featured 20 Toronto artists, had lead singer Damian Abraham inside Rotate This talking about his love of vinyl and punk music.

Fucked Up played the ATP New York 2010 music festival in Monticello, New York in September 2010 as well as an annual Halloween gig in Toronto. In February 2011, the band toured Australia for the first time, as a part of the Soundwave Festival, along with side-shows from the festival with artists as diverse as the Bronx, Terror, H_{2}O, Trash Talk and Polar Bear Club.

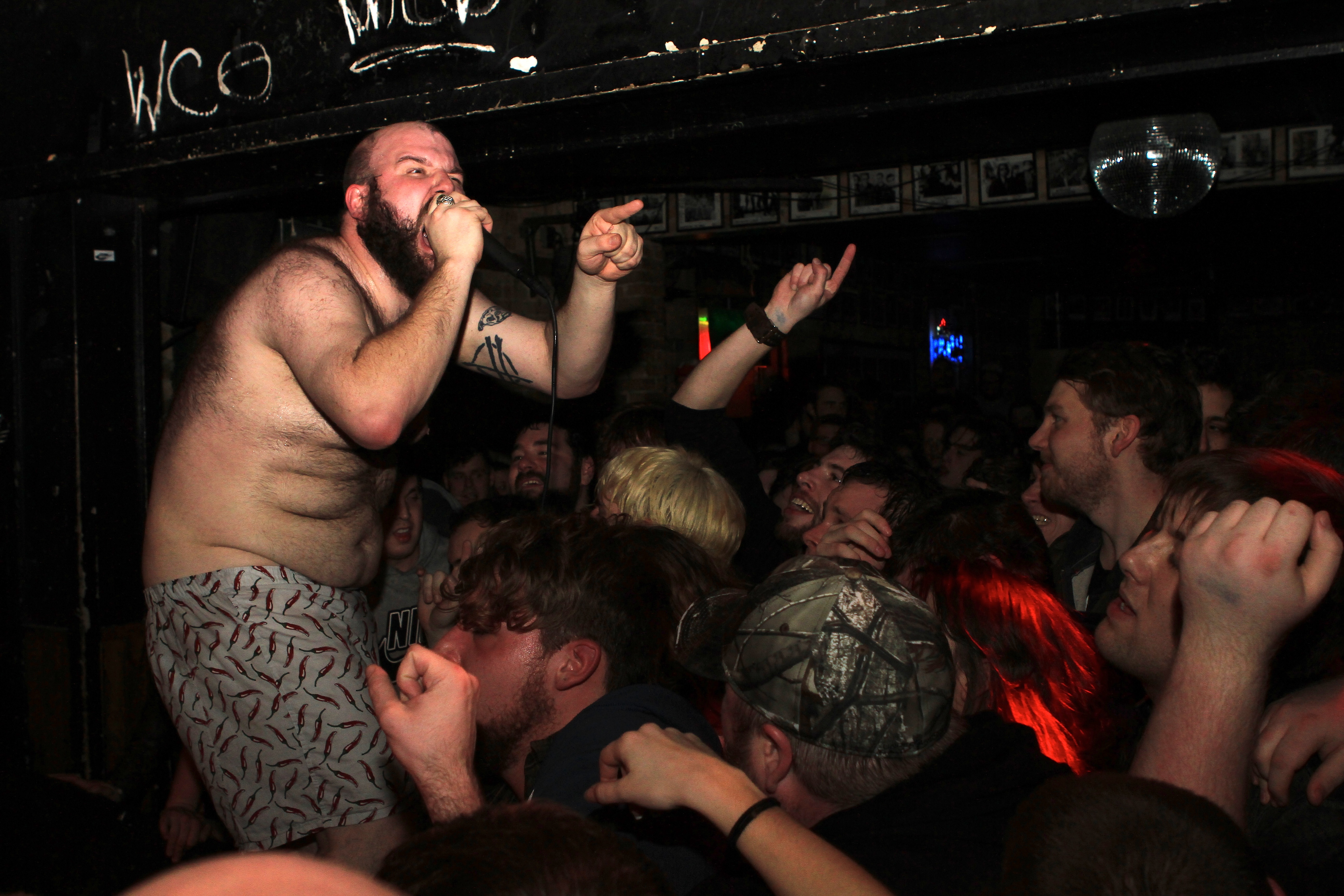
Live performance, 2013

The band's third studio album, David Comes to Life, was released in June 2011. A self-professed "rock opera" set in Thatcherite Britain, it tells a story of love, loss and redemption, with the story complicated by misdirection and unreliable narrators. The record debuted at No. 83 on the Billboard 200 in the US and received wide critical acclaim. Spin magazine named David Comes to Life its No. 1 Album of 2011, and put the band on the cover, writing "Fucked Up have synthesized 40 years of rock into what's ostensibly a hardcore record, and in doing so created its own logic." Like the previous release, this album was also nominated for the Polaris Music Prize, the nomination describing the record as "Excessive? Sure. Ridiculous? At times. Brilliant? Sounds pretty damn close to it." They did not win for a second time, being beaten by Feist's album Metals.

In late 2011, the band went on hiatus to allow Abraham to raise his family, but they returned in June 2012 to play the Metallica-curated Orion Music + More Festival in Atlantic City, New Jersey, and went on to play Fun Fun Fun Fest in November 2012, in Austin, Texas.

Fucked Up's fourth LP, named Glass Boys, was released by Matador Records on June 3, 2014. Avatars of the band and their songs "Paper the House" and "Queen of Hearts" were featured in the 2016 video game Loud on Planet X.

In 2016, the band self-released Zanzibar, a soundtrack, recorded in 2011, to Tod Browning's silent movie from 1928 West of Zanzibar starring Lon Chaney. Their fifth studio album, Dose Your Dreams was released in October 2018 by Merge Records. Driven by guitarist Haliechuk, it is a concept album focusing on the band's recurring character David, and featuring several guest lead vocalists, alongside Abraham, Falco, and Haliechuk.

The band released their sixth studio album and the ninth installment in the Zodiac series, Year of the Horse, in full on May 7, 2021. It was ranked number eleven on Decibel magazine's list of the "Top 40 Albums of 2021" and seventh on the "10 best albums of 2021" list of The Plain Dealer.

In November 2021, it was revealed that longtime guitarist Ben Cook had left the band, with Haliechuk revealing that Robin Hatch would be replacing him during live performances for the tour that followed.

=== One Day album series: 2023–2024 ===
On January 27, 2023, the band released their sixth studio album, One Day. The album was recorded between 2019 and 2022, which each band member recording their parts remotely within a strict 24-hour timeframe across the COVID-19 pandemic.

Between August 6 and August 7, 2024, the band livestreamed themselves as they wrote, recorded, mixed and released a full studio album in twenty-four hours. The resulting album, Who's Got the Time & A Half?, was released on BandCamp for twenty-four hours only at the end of the livestream.

The band's eighth studio album, Another Day, was released on August 9, 2024. The album is a direct sequel to One Day, and was recorded with the same parameters of each band member having only twenty-four hours to record their parts. Each track on Another Day corresponds to its parallel track on One Day, with guitarist Mike Haliechuk noting that the band plans on releasing four interconnected albums all recorded in the space of one day.

The band surprise-released the third album in the series, Someday, on November 1, 2024. Upon the album's release, the band stated: "This record is about how far our actions and our ideas can travel, and how we can plant consequences in the lives of other people without even realizing it and how we can use our lives to make this a better world." The album predominately features lead vocals from guitarist and primary songwriter Mike Haliechuk, with guest appearances from Tuka Mohammed and Julianna Riolino.

=== Grass Can Move Stones: 2025–present ===
On September 30, 2025, the band announced Grass Can Move Stones, a "ten-part finale" to the band's long-running Zodiac album series, which began in 2006. The release series will include three full-length albums, with the band stating: "Join us over the next year as we release the Year of the Goat LP, the Year of the Monkey 2xLP, and the Year of the Rooster 2xLP in instalments, one story spread over almost five hours of music, that dives back into the characters, narratives, and music from all our previous zodiac records, told by dozens of characters and special guests."

== Lawsuit ==
In January 2008, Fucked Up, along with Xiu Xiu, filed a lawsuit against Rolling Stone and Camel Cigarettes for an advertisement that included both bands in an Indie Rock Universe special. The advertisement apparently portrayed the bands as supporters of Camel.

On January 28, 2010, The Court of Appeal of the State of California for the First Appellate District reversed the lower court's ruling, saying constitutional principles of freedom of speech and the press require that the lawsuit be dismissed.

== Collaborations ==
Fucked Up has collaborated extensively with other artists on record and during live performances. Hidden World features guest instrumentation from Final Fantasy, as well as guest vocals by Ben Cook of No Warning, two years before he joined Fucked Up, George Pettit and Dallas Green, of Alexisonfire, Chris Colohan of Cursed, and Heidi Hazelton. Year of the Pig was written in part with Max Mccabe-Locos of The Deadly Snakes, who plays piano and organ on the record, and a lead vocal by Jennifer Castle of Castlemusic. In late 2007, the holiday charity single David Christmas featured guest vocals from Nelly Furtado, Davey Havok, David Cross, Shenae Grimes of Degrassi: The Next Generation and Faris Badwan of The Horrors, among others.

Circle Jerks singer Keith Morris has performed live with Fucked Up, singing Backed Against the Wall, Beverly Hills, and the Black Flag song Nervous Breakdown in March 2008, at the Mess With Texas Fest in Austin, Texas, and again on Nervous Breakdown in February 2009, at the Echoplex in Los Angeles. The band were joined by former Dead Kennedys singer Jello Biafra, for their encore of the Ramones' Blitzkrieg Bop at the same Los Angeles gig.

Fucked Up released a second all-star Christmas single in December 2009, this time a cover of Band Aid's Do They Know It's Christmas?, featuring Ezra Koenig of Vampire Weekend, the members of Yo La Tengo, David Cross (again), Kevin Drew of Broken Social Scene, Tegan & Sara, Andrew W.K., Bob Mould, Kyp Malone of TV On The Radio, and GZA. Proceeds from the single go to benefit three charitable organizations working to publicize the high disappearance rate of Aboriginal women in Canada.

For Record Store Day in April 2011 Fucked Up released a special exclusive LP entitled David's Town. It is not billed to Fucked Up, and instead pretends to be a compilation album documenting the scene in the fictitious UK city of Byrdesdale Spa, the late '70s setting for the band's upcoming "rock opera" David's Come To Life. Each song featured a guest singer (one was sung by the band's vocalist Abraham, three were sung by other band members), including Danko Jones, Wesley Patrick Gonzalez, Dan Romano, Simone Schmidt, Cee Kay, A.C. Newman and Dylan Baldi.

== Television appearances ==
This is the list of all known appearances of Fucked Up or their songs on mainstream television.

- MTV Live Canada - 2 live performances
- "Baiting The Public" (from Hidden World) is used in The Bad Girls Club episode 30.
- "Son The Father" (from The Chemistry of Common Life) is used in Friday Night Lights and Skins. It was also used in the film Cedar Rapids.
- Red Eye host Greg Gutfeld declared The Chemistry of Common Life the best album of 2008 and interviewed Abraham.
- George Stroumboulopoulos Tonight Christmas Special 2010
- Cedar Rapids (2011), song "Born Again" is featured in a scene.
- George Stroumboulopoulos Tonight December 2011
- Anthony Bourdain: No Reservations Season 7 Episode 17 "Holiday Special" performing "Jingle Bells" (December 12, 2011)
- The Layover Season 2, Episode 5 (December 17, 2012)
- The Chris Gethard Show Episode 97 (June 26, 2013)
- Billions Season 2, Episode 8 (April 9, 2017)

== Band members ==
=== Current ===
- Damian "Pink Eyes" Abraham — lead vocals (2001–present)
- Mike "10,000 Marbles" Haliechuk — lead guitar, keyboards, occasional bass, backing and occasional lead vocals (2001–present)
- Josh "Concentration Camp"/"Gulag" Zucker — rhythm guitar, keyboards, backing vocals (2001–present)
- Sandy "Mustard Gas" Miranda — bass, occasional drums, backing vocals (2001–present)
- Jonah "Mr. Jo" Falco — drums, guitar, keyboards, backing vocals (2001–present)

=== Touring ===
- Robin Hatch — keyboards, backing vocals (2022)
- Dorothea Paas — rhythm guitar, backing vocals (2023)
- Dave Nardi — rhythm guitar, backing vocals (2024–present)

=== Former ===
- Chris Colohan — drums (2001)
- Ben "Young Guv" Cook — rhythm guitar, backing vocals (2007–2021)

== Discography ==
Studio albums

- Hidden World (2006)
- The Chemistry of Common Life (2008)
- David Comes to Life (2011)
- Glass Boys (2014)
- Dose Your Dreams (2018)
- One Day (2023)
- Who's Got the Time & a Half? (2024)
- Another Day (2024)
- Someday (2024)

== Music videos ==
- "Crooked Head" (2008)
- "Queen of Hearts" (2011)
- "The Other Shoe" (2011)
- "Do You Feed ? (The Curry Song)" (2011)
- "Turn the Season" (2012)
- "Inside a Frame" (2012)
- "Paper the House" (2014)
- "Led by Hand" (2014)
- "Sun Glass" (2014)
- "The Art of Patrons" (2014)
- "Year of the Hare" (2015)
- "Normal People" (2018)
- "Accelerate" (2018)
- "Dose Your Dreams" (2019)

=== Motion pictures ===
- Burn (2007)
- The Last Pogo Jumps Again (2013)

== See also ==
- Canadian rock
