= Sean McGrath (musician) =

American musician

Sean McGrath is a musician and artist based out of Oakland, California. He is the founder, guitarist, and vocalist of the death metal band, Impaled, the vocalist of Engorged, and the lead guitarist and lead vocalist of Ghoul. He has also created artwork for a number of heavy metal and punk bands, most notably Municipal Waste and The Black Dahlia Murder.

== Discography ==
=== Demos ===
- Aceldama - "Untitled Cassette Demo", 1994
- Inhumation - Medicolegal Investigations of Death (Demo Cassette), 1995
- Impaled - Septic Vomit (Demo Cassette), 1997
- Impaled - Untitled (Demo Cassette), 1998
- Impaled - From Here to Colostomy (Demo Cassette), 1999
- Ghoul - Self Titled (Demo Cassette), 2003
- The Death of Everything - "Self Titled" (Demo), 2006

=== Albums ===
- Impaled - The Dead Shall Dead Remain (CD), 2000 Necropolis Records
- Impaled - Mondo Medicale (CD), 2002 Necropolis Records
- Impaled - Death After Life (CD), 2005 Century Media Records
- Impaled - The Last Gasp (CD), 2007 Willowtip Records
- Ghoul - We Came for the Dead!!! (CD), 2003 Razorback Records
- Ghoul - Maniaxe (CD), 2004 Razorback Records
- Ghoul - Splatterthrash (CD), 2006–2007 Razorback Records - re-released on Nerve Damage Records / (Vinyl LP), 2007 Tankcrimes Records
- Ghoul - Transmission Zero (Vinyl LP/CD), 2012 Tankcrimes Records

=== EPs ===
- Impaled - Choice Cuts (Extended Play CD), 2001 Necropolis Records
- Impaled - Medical Waste (EP CD), 2002 Necropolis Records
- Black Ops - "Pain is Weakness Leaving the Body" (7" Split)
- Ghoul - Intermediate Level Hard-Core (Vinyl EP), 2013 Clearview Records / (CD EP), 2013 Tankcrimes Records

=== Videos ===
- Impaled - "Operating Theatre"
- Impaled - "Choke On It"
- Impaled - "Preservation of Death"

=== Guest appearances ===
- Exhumed - Slaughtercult (guest vocals)
- Frightmare - Bringing Back the Bloodshed (guest vocals)
- Morbosidad - Cagada de Christo (guest vocals)
- Scolex - Guest live musician 2011 (guitars)
