= All Guts, No Glory =

Studio album by Exhumed
- Released: July 5, 2011
- Recorded: 2010–2011 Arcane Digital Recordings, Trench Studios, Mana Recording Studios
- Genre: Death metal
- Length: 36:06
- Label: Relapse

Exhumed chronology
Garbage Daze Re-Regurgitated (2005)	All Guts, No Glory (2011)	Necrocracy (2013)

All Guts, No Glory is the fifth full-length album by death metal band Exhumed, and the first since their 2010 reformation. It was released on July 5, 2011, by Relapse Records. Dane Prokofiev of PopMatters said the album is capable of "reminding you why Exhumed were and will continue to be revered as the gods of gore-themed death metal." The last album to feature bassist Leon del Muerte and guitarist Wes Caley and the only one to feature drummer Danny Walker.

== Background ==
In an interview conducted shortly after announcing that Exhumed would reform, founding member Matt Harvey remarked, "After a few years off and away from the death metal scene, I feel rejuvenated and ready to hack, maim and kill once again. I wanted this to be a continuation of what the band was doing and was on its way to doing, not a reunion or some weird nostalgia thing."

During Exhumed's five-year hiatus, Harvey had "barely played" death metal or grindcore. As a result, when the band reformed, he had to re-learn his songwriting style. According to Harvey, "I sat down one night, cracked open many a beer and listened to stuff from the entire history of the band."

In 2010, the band recorded All Guts, No Glory. The album line-up was Matt Harvey on guitars and high vocals, Leon del Muerte on bass and low vocals, Wes Caley on guitar and Danny Walker on drums. The musical approach taken on All Guts, No Glory was, according to Harvey, intentionally based on the band members' favoured elements of previous Exhumed records: "We all agreed that the period of Exhumed we liked the best was Slaughtercult and wanted to mix that with the technicality and melody of Anatomy." However, it was Harvey's desire not to "do anything quite as conceptual or heady as Anatomy."

In keeping with the desire to diminish the tightly regimented approach of Anatomy Is Destiny, a more "raw and spontaneous" approach was taken with respect to recording the album. "We let shit slide with the guitars that would have been edited on Anatomy," commented Harvey. "We left vocal takes that might not be quite as on-time as they could be, simply to keep the vibe of the song intact...It wasn't a case of contrived regression, but of not over-thinking things."

== Reception ==
Professional ratings
Review scores
Source	Rating
AllMusic	3.5/5 stars
Blabbermouth	8.5/10 stars
Last Rites	8/10 stars
MetalUnderground.com	4.5/5 stars
OneMetal	4.5/5 stars
Popmatters	7/10 stars

All Guts, No Glory was generally well-received, with most critics observing that the album stepped away from the technicality of the previous studio album, Anatomy Is Destiny. Thom Jurek of AllMusic wrote, "while not returning to the band's gore-grind demo era of yore, [All Guts, No Glory] is a more stripped-to-the-bone and go-straight-for-the-entrails outing than 2003's Anatomy Is Destiny". However, Joe Reviled of Metal Underground wrote that the album is not a simple return to the looser performance of Gore Metal, noting, "the music is dense and overwhelming, but precise, revelling purely in the blood-soaked insanity."

In 2012, Decibel Magazine ranked All Guts, No Glory at No. 91 on their Top 100 Death Metal Albums of All Time list.

== Track listing ==
All lyrics are written by Matt Harvey; all music is composed by Exhumed, unless otherwise noted.

No.	Title	Length
1.	"All Guts, No Glory"	1:48
2.	"As Hammer to Anvil"	3:38
3.	"Your Funeral, My Feast"	3:27
4.	"Through Cadaver Eyes"	4:08
5.	"Death Knell"	3:48
6.	"Distorted and Twisted to Form"	2:40
7.	"I Rot Within"	3:44
8.	"Dis-assembly Line"	3:00
9.	"Necrotized"	3:39
10.	"Funereality"	3:01
11.	"So Let It Be Rotten... So Let It Be Done"	3:13

Deluxe Edition bonus tracks
No.	Title	Length
12.	"The Way of All Flesh"	2:24
13.	"Unclean"	2:47
14.	"To Wake the Dead"	3:12
15.	"Cold Caress"	3:58
16.	"Necromaniac 2011"	2:36
17.	"Forged in Fire (Formed in Flames) 2011" (Mike Beams)	3:03

== Personnel ==
- Matt Harvey – guitars, vocals
- Leon del Muerte – bass, vocals
- Danny Walker – drums
- Wes Caley – guitars

=== Production ===
- Ryan Butler – engineering
- John Haddad – engineering
- Brian Elliott – mastering, mixing
- Matthew F. Jacobson – executive production
- Sawa – photography
- Orion Landau – cover art
