= Tony Foresta =

American singer

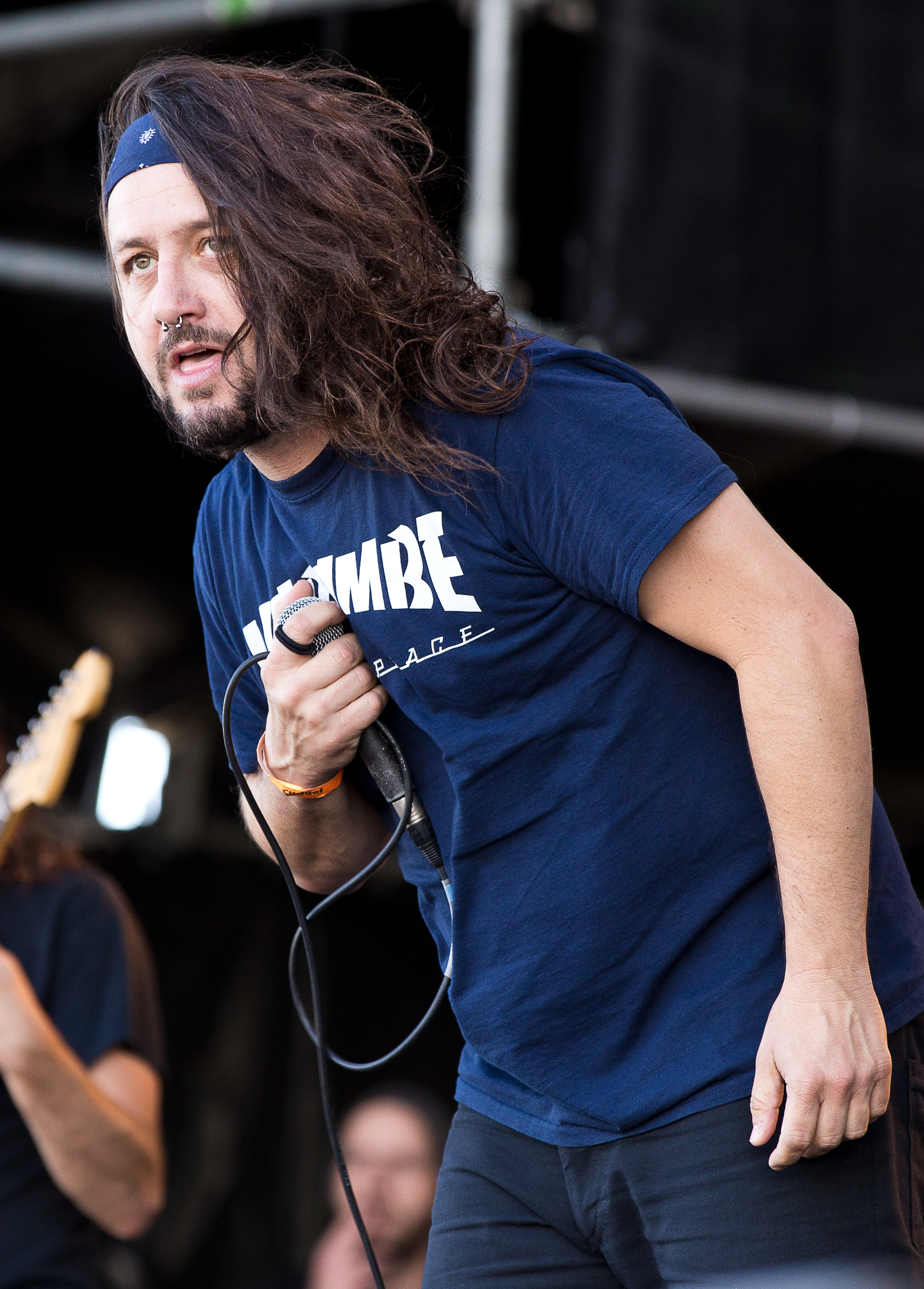
- Foresta with Iron Reagan at Party.San Metal Open Air 2016

Background information
- Also known as: Guardrail
- Born: Anthony Russell Foresta; May 20, 1976 (age 50); Petersburg, Virginia, U.S.
- Origin: Richmond, Virginia, U.S.
- Genres: Crossover thrash
- Occupations: Singer, songwriter
- Years active: 2001–present
- Member of: Municipal Waste, Iron Reagan, Heaven's Gate
- Formerly of: Rich Kids on LSD

Anthony Russell Foresta (born May 20, 1976) is an American vocalist who is the lead singer of crossover thrash bands Municipal Waste, Iron Reagan and (since 2022) the supergroup Heaven's Gate which he helped co-found with Cannibal Corpse drummer Paul Mazurkiewicz. In 2024, Foresta joined as the new lead vocalist of hardcore punk band Rich Kids on LSD.

Foresta founded Municipal Waste in 2001 with Ryan Waste, Andy Harris, and Brendan Trache. In 2012, Foresta, along with Municipal Waste bandmate Phil Hall, Ryan Parrish, and Paul Burnette formed Iron Reagan.

== Early life ==
Anthony Foresta was raised in St Petersburg, Florida. Growing up near the water Foresta became an avid surfer and skimboarder from an early age age. While in high school Foresta was on the wrestling team and diving team, he also briefly studied to become an actor. Growing up he liked bands such as the Beastie Boys, Wu-Tang Clan, Minor Threat and Sonic Youth.

Following high school Foresta moved to Virginia, where he worked as a projectionist. During the mid 1990s Foresta joined his first band called James River Scratch. A group that he described as "trying to be Richmond’s version of Gang Green. They released a 7-inch on Beer City Records and a couple Richmond comps.

== Career ==
=== Municipal Waste ===
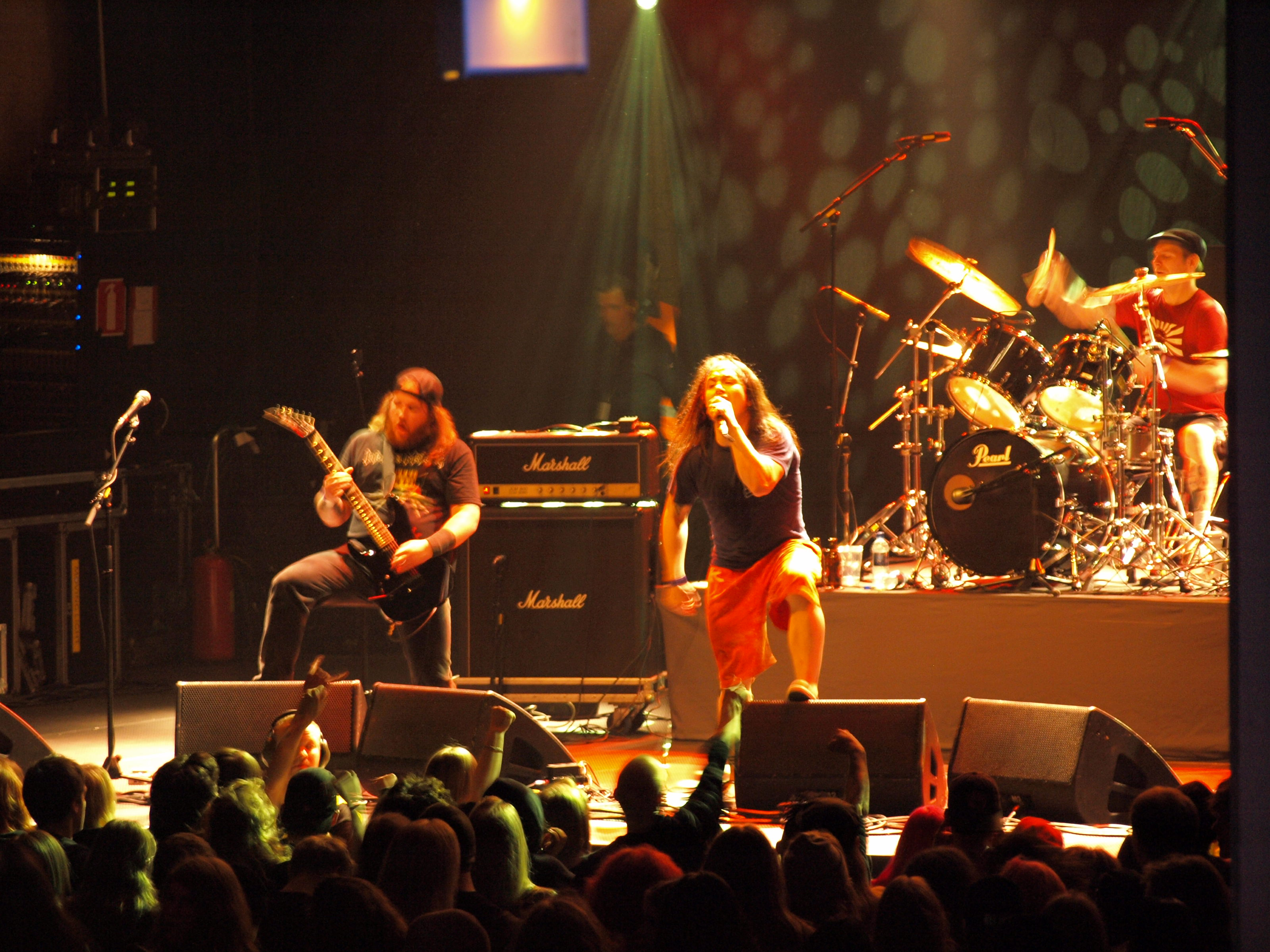
Foresta performing with Municipal Waste in 2008

In 2001 Foresta along with Ryan Waste started the crossover thrash metal band Municipal Waste. Their first self titled Ep was released that same year and their debut album Waste 'Em All was released two years later in 2003. They then gained recognition with their 2005 album Hazardous Mutation and 2007 The Art of Partying, which have both been dubbed pivotal albums in the thrash genre and were both named the best trash metal albums of their respective release years by Loudwire.

The band have since released 7 studio albums and have been called "an integral force in the second wave of the American crossover/thrash metal scene".

=== Iron Reagan ===
Since the 1990s Foresta had been talking to former Darkest Hour drummer Ryan Parrish. So when Parrish left Darkest Hour in 2011 and Municipal Waste had just come off a long touring cycle the two finally started a new band together called Iron Reagan. In 2012 their debut release Demo 2012 was released and they went on to release three albums Worse Than Dead, The Tyranny of Will and most recently Slime and Punishment.

In 2020 the band went on hiatus, however they announced their return in late 2025 and have begun touring again with their classic lineup.

=== Heavens Gate ===
In 2022 he founded Heavens Gate alongside Paul Mazurkiewicz of Cannibal Corpse, the band also features Mike Goo and bassist Jeff Howe. Their debut self titled Ep was released in February of 2023, in 2025 their debut album Tales From A Blistering paradise was released.

=== Rich Kids on LSD ===
Foresta first joined forces with Rich Kids on LSD in 2021 to record a new version of their "Sargasm" which appeared on their 1987 album Rock N Roll Nightmare. When some of the original members of the band reunited in 2024 Foresta served as their lead vocalist during their reunion tour.

== Personal life ==
Foresta resides in St Petersburg, Florida. He is a pro wrestling fan and during the COVID 19-pandemic while Municipal Waste wasn’t touring he worked for the WWE during their thunderdome era. During this tenure he worked as a runner setting up the ring. When the WWE went back to performing in front of live crowds they asked Foresta to continue working for them however he had to decline due to a blowing his knee out while working at WrestleMania.

== Recording history ==
=== With Municipal Waste ===
- Municipal Waste (2001, Amendment Records / Busted Heads Records)
- Municipal Waste / Crucial Unit (2002, Six Weeks Records)
- Tango and Thrash (w/Bad Acid Trip) (2003, Mordar Records)
- Waste 'Em All (2003, Six Weeks Records)
- Louder Than Hell (2005, Six Weeks Records)
- Hazardous Mutation (2005, Earache Records)
- The Art of Partying (2007, Earache Records)
- Massive Aggressive (2009, Earache Records)
- Scion Presents: Municipal Waste (2012, Scion Audio Visual)
- The Fatal Feast (2012, Nuclear Blast Records)
- Garbage Pack (2012, Night of the Vinyl Dead Records)
- Toxic Waste (w/ Toxic Holocaust) (2012, Tankcrimes Records)
- Slime and Punishment (2017, Nuclear Blast Records)
- The Last Rager (2019, Nuclear Blast Records)
- Electrified Brain (2022, Nuclear Blast Records)

=== With Iron Reagan ===
- Demo 2012 (2012, Tankcrimes)
- Worse Than Dead (2013, A389)
- Exhumed/Iron Reagan (2014, Tankcrimes)
- Spoiled Identity EP (2014, Magic Bullet / A389)
- The Tyranny of Will (2014, Relapse)
- Iron Reagan/Toxic Shock (2015, Reflections)
- Crossover Ministry (2017, Relapse)
- Iron Reagan/Gatecreeper (2018, Relapse)
- Dark Days Ahead (2018, Pop Wig)
- Demonetization (2026, Relapse)

=== With Heaven's Gate ===
- Heaven's Gate (2023, Beach Impediment)
- Tales From A Blistering paradise

(2025, Beach Impediment)

=== Guest appearances ===
- Pasadena Napalm Division (2013) by Pasadena Napalm Division − guest vocals on "Murder the Bearded Lady Killer"
- Hang Ten (2014) by Ghoul − guest vocals on "Kreeg"
