= Impaled (band) =

American death metal band

- Origin: Oakland, California, U.S.
- Genres: Death metal, grindcore
- Years active: 1995–present
- Labels: Willowtip, Century Media, Necropolis, Death Vomit, Razorback
- Members: Sean McGrath; Raul Varela; Ross Sewage; Jason Kocol; Leon del Muerte
- Website: impaled.info

Impaled is an American death metal band from Oakland, California. The band's backronym name stands for "Immoral Medical Practitioners And Licentious Evil-Doers".

== History ==
The band was founded by guitarist Sean McGrath in late 1996, who joined drummer Raul Varela, guitarist Jared Deaver (ex-Deeds of Flesh, ex-Severed Savior) and bassist Ron Dorn to record the 1997 demo Septic Vomit.

In 1998, Leon del Muerte, former guitarist for Exhumed, joined the line-up as lead vocalist. After Jared Deaver's departure, del Muerte took over second guitar in addition to singing. Due to tour scheduling conflicts, Ron Dorn was asked to leave and was temporarily replaced with bassist Ross Sewage, who was playing with Exhumed and Ludicra. Sewage later became a full-time member of Impaled.

In 1999, the band released a second demo, From Here to Colostomy, which gained the band some recognition. A year later, the band contributed to a split 7-inch record with deathgrind band Cephalic Carnage by Italian label Headfucker Records. The band released its first full-length album, The Dead Shall Dead Remain, followed by a tour of the US with Nile and Incantation.

In the same year, the band released a 7-inch split with Engorged and toured with death metal bands Vader and Skinless. Impaled recorded tracks for tribute albums for Carcass and Impetigo. Soon after the tour, del Muerte departed, replaced with guitarist Andrew LaBarre, formerly of Hoarfrost and Prevail.

The new line-up recorded Mondo Medicale in 2002, to relative acclaim from metal fans. The album was supposedly banned in several countries for its cover art; it was later re-released with a censored version of the original artwork. Band members have stated in interviews that the sticker on some copies of the album proclaiming "Banned in 84 Countries" was a publicity stunt. Soon after touring for Mondo Medicale, LaBarre left the band and Jason Kocol replaced him.

In 2004, the concept album Death After Life was recorded, produced by Trey Spruance. It was not released until 2005 due to scheduling difficulties at the label.

Impaled members Sean McGrath and Ross Sewage also play in the band Ghoul, who have released four albums.

In 2007, the band signed to Willowtip Records for the European distribution of their new album. Their next album, The Last Gasp, was completed in August and released November 6, 2007. Leaked versions of the album appeared on various P2P networks in the leading months, which was a prank by the band and contained the track "Captain Butt-beard the Pirate", which taunted and insulted the listener for their thievery.

== Musical style and influences ==
According to William York of AllMusic, Impaled "sound like Carcass (specifically, like a cross between Necroticism and Heartwork)." The band explores medical horror and feces-related themes in its lyrics. The band also incorporates a strong sense of melody.

== Band members ==
=== Current members ===
- Sean McGrath – guitars, vocals (1995–present)
- Raul Varela – drums (1995–present)
- Ross Sewage – bass, vocals (1999–present)
- Jason Kocol – guitars, vocals (2004–present)
- Leon del Muerte – vocals (1997–2001, 2012–present), guitars (1999–2001)

Each member of Impaled is occasionally represented by a nickname, these are listed below:

- Dr. Sean "Bloodbath" McGrath – M.D. (Medical Deviant)
- Dr. Jason Kocol – E.M.T. (Emergency Metal Technician)
- Dr. Raul Varela – Ph.D. (Doctor of Philandering)
- Dr. "Monsewer" Ross Sewage – R.N. (Registered Nut)

=== Former members ===
- Jared Deaver – guitars, vocals (1995–1998)
- Ron Dorn – bass (1995–1998)
- Jeremy Frye – vocals (1995–1996)
- Andrew LaBarre – guitars, vocals (2001–2004; died 2022)

== Discography ==
=== Studio albums ===
- The Dead Shall Dead Remain (2000), Necropolis Records)
- Mondo Medicale (2002, Death Vomit Records)
- Death After Life (2005, Century Media Records)
- The Last Gasp (2007, Willowtip Records)

=== Re-recorded albums ===
- The Dead Still Dead Remain (2013, Willowtip Records)

=== EPs ===
- Medical Waste (2002, Death Vomit Records)
- Digital Autopsy (2007, Vomitcore)

=== Compilations ===
- Choice Cuts (2001, Death Vomit Records)
- HF.Seveninches.Collection.Vol1 – Reissue of split with Cephalic Carnage, compiled with the Exhumed/Retaliation split (2008, Dracma/Masterpiece/Ugugumo)

=== Splits ===
- Split with Cephalic Carnage (1999, Headfucker Records)
- Split with Engorged (2000, Discos Al Pacino)
- Dementia Rex – split with Haemorrhage (2003, Razorback Records)

=== Demos ===
- Septic Vomit (1997, Self-released)
- From Here to Colostomy (1997, Self-released)
