= Iron Reagan =

American crossover thrash band

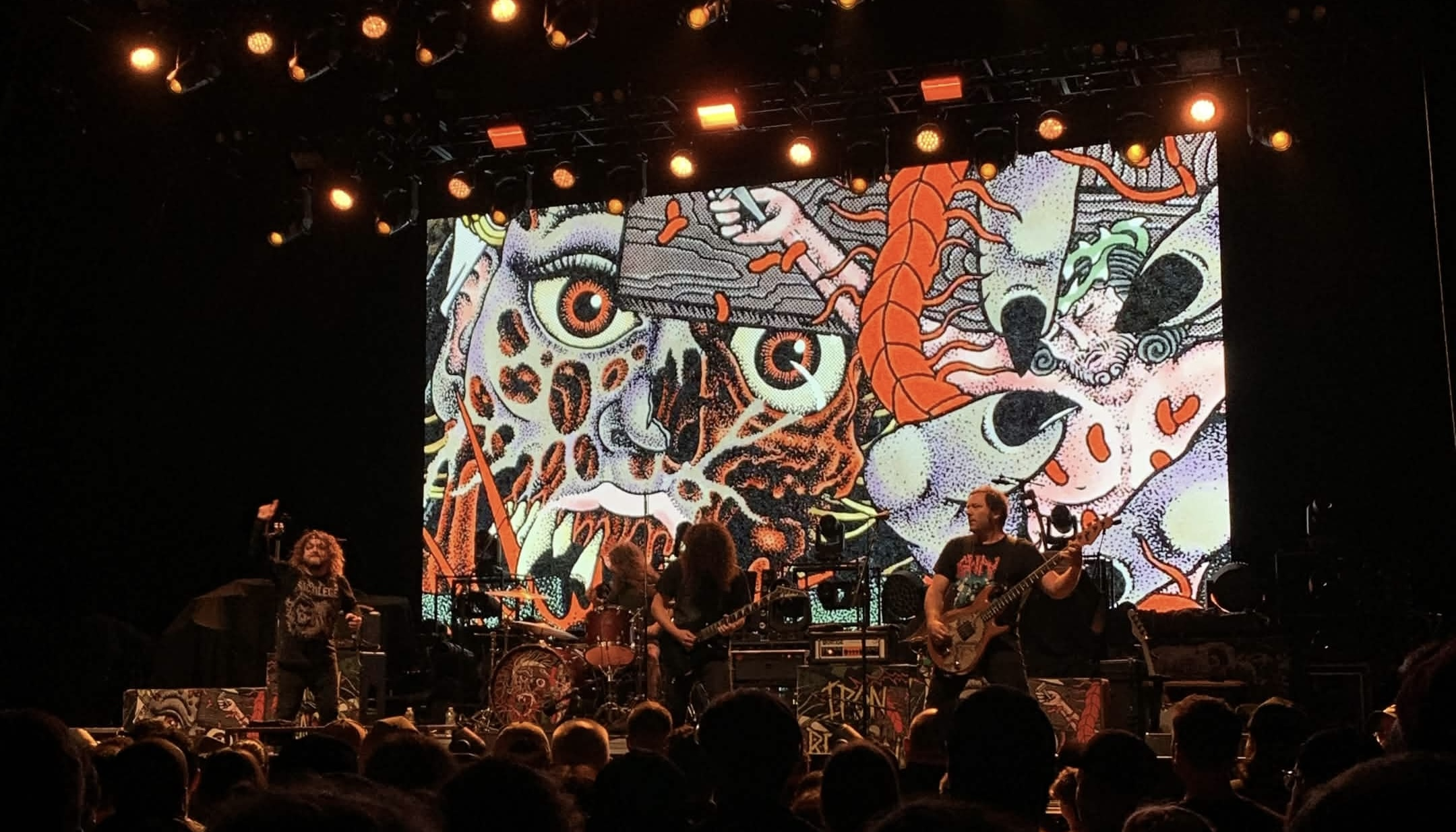
- Iron Reagan performing at the RoadRunner Boston, Massachusetts 2026

Background information
- Origin: Richmond, Virginia, U.S.
- Genres: Crossover thrash
- Years active: 2012–2020; 2025–present
- Labels: Relapse; Tankcrimes; Reflections; A389; Pop Wig
- Members: Ryan Parrish; Land Phil; Adam Guillimas; Paul Burnette; Tony Foresta
- Past members: Rob Skotis; Mark Bronzino
- Website: ironreagan.bandcamp.com
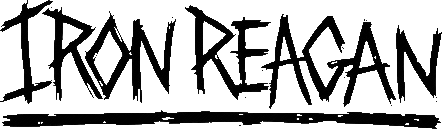

Iron Reagan is an American crossover thrash supergroup from Richmond, Virginia, consisting of Municipal Waste vocalist Tony Foresta, Cannabis Corpse and Municipal Waste bassist Phil "LandPhil" Hall, former A.N.S. guitarist Mark Bronzino, former Darkest Hour drummer Ryan Parrish, and Hellbear bassist Paul Burnette. Since their formation in 2012, they have released three full-length albums, two EPs and three split EPs. Their 2014 album The Tyranny of Will peaked at 22 on the Billboard 200.

The band went on hiatus in 2020 however they announced their return in the October of 2025, featuring their original lineup.

== History ==
=== 2012–2013: Formation, Demo 2012 and Worse Than Dead ===
Since the 1990s Municipal Waster singer Tony Foresta had been talking to former Darkest Hour drummer Ryan Parrish on starting a side project together. So when Parrish left Darkest Hour in 2011 and Municipal Waste had just come off a long touring cycle the two finally started a new band together called Iron Reagan. The group officially formed in 2012 and consisted of members Tony Foresta of Municipal Waste, Paul Burnette formerly of Darkest Hour, Phil Hall of Cannabis Corpse and Municipal Waste and Ryan Parrish also formerly of Darkest Hour. The name of the band is a pun on the heavy metal band Iron Maiden and the 40th president of the United States, Ronald Reagan.

That year, the group released their first demo, Demo 2012, through Tankcrimes Records which featured the tracks "Pay Check", "Eat Shit and Live", "Artificial Saints", "Running Out of Time" and "Walking Out". The first two tracks went on to be featured in their debut full-length album. By November of 2012 the band had officially began recording their debut album.

On March 20, 2013, the band released their debut studio album Worse Than Dead through the record label A389 Recordings. It was produced by guitarist Phil Hall. The album received a score of 5 out of 10 by Exclaim!, saying, "they're basically indistinguishable from their singer and guitarist's main band. Iron Reagan are rounded out by ex-members of Darkest Hour, but their influence isn't nearly as prominent as the crossover thrash of Municipal Waste." Following the album’s release Iron Reagan spent the rest of 2013 touring the East and West coast of the US with acts such as Drop Dead, Whiplash, Powertrip, Witchhaven, GWAR, Hatebreed, and Mean Jeans.

Bassist Paul Burnette left the band and was replaced by Mark Bronzino, who later switched to guitar and was replaced by Rob Skotis of Hellbear.

=== 2014–2016: Spoiled Identity EP, Tyranny of Will and split EPs ===
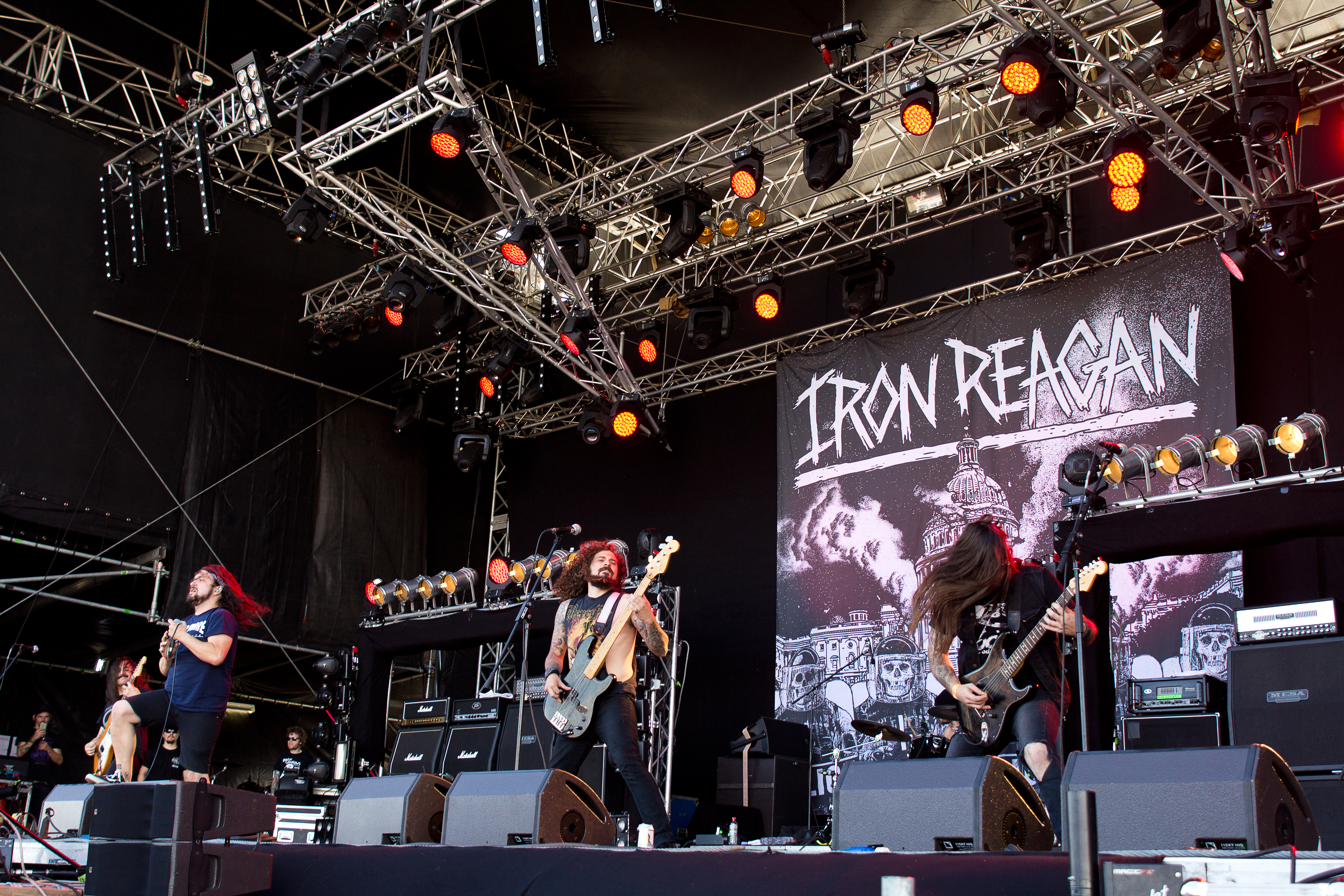
Iron Reagan performing at Metal Open Air in 2016

On January 7, 2014, Iron Reagan and death metal band Exhumed released a split EP entitled Exhumed/Iron Reagan on Tankcrimes. The first side of the record contained four tracks by Exhumed, while the second side contained four tracks by Iron Reagan.

The band independently released their first extended play, Spoiled Identity EP, on April 1, 2014, as a free online download. The EP featured 13 tracks and was under five minutes in total length. A 2015 limited edition re-release on vinyl included two bonus tracks. During the April of 2014, the group went on an extensive tour alongside Occultist.

Iron Reagan signed onto Relapse Records with and released their second full-length studio album, The Tyranny of Will, on September 16, 2014, and was produced by Phil Hall. The album debuted at number 22 on the US Heatseekers chart, and was met with positive reception receiving a 75/100 on Metacritic. Following the album’s release the group went on a US tour alongside Eyehategod.

To start of 2015 Iron Reagan went on an extensive US tour with Napalm Death and Voivod. In March of that year Iron Reagan released another split EP, this time with Toxic Shock through Reflections Records. The first side of the record featured three tracks by Iron Reagan and the second side featured three tracks by Toxic Shock. In late 2015 Iron Reagan toured the US with The Black Dahlia Murder and Goatwhore.

In January 2016 Iron Reagan toured Europe with Ignite, Terror and H2O. The band began recording of their third full-length album, in summer 2016. The album was announced through Relapse.

=== 2017–2024: Crossover Ministry and hiatus ===
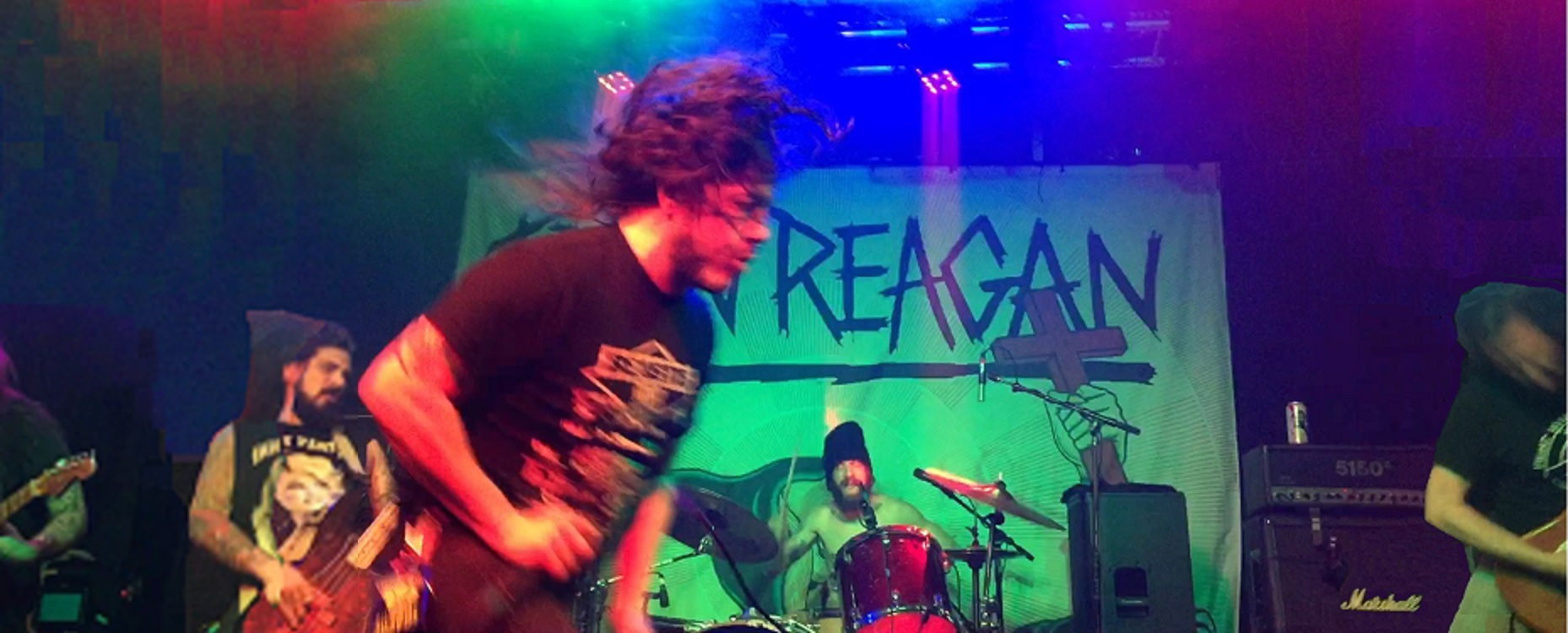
Iron Reagan live at the Broadberry, Richmond, VA in 2017

On February 3, 2017, their third studio album Crossover Ministry was released to positive acclaim. Exclaim! gave the album and 8 out of 10, stating in their review: "Overall though, Crossover Ministry is a well-made crossover thrash album that's sure to be a hit with fans of the genre and could be the selling point for people just getting into it." Following the album’s release Iron Reagan toured North America in support of the album with Powertrip in February and March of that year.

In 2018 Iron Reagan released a split EP with Gatekeeper, later that year they released another EP called Dark Days Ahead on October 12. Foresta stated that the songs for Dark Days Ahead were written for their 2017 album Crossover Ministry but didn't fit the album's sound.

In March of 2019, the group toured the US with Sick of it All, in April they released a split EP alongside Sacred Reich. Following the EP release the two toured the US with Leeway.

On January 14, 2020, it was announced the band had parted ways with bassist Rob Skotis over sexual misconduct allegations, the group then went dormant soon after.

=== 2025-present: Return ===
It was announced on October, 29th, 2025 on the bands official Instagram page that they would be playing live again. Featuring the lineup from their debut album Worse Than Dead line up, which consists of vocalist Tony Foresta, guitarist Phil Hall, Paul Burnette, Ryan Parrish, along with a new guitarist Adam Guilliams. Their comeback show took place on February 14th 2026 at Eau Gallie Civic Center in Melbourne, Florida. The band will tour the US in the late spring and early summer of 2026 with Killswitch Engage and Machine Head. On June 9, 2026, Iron Reagan released their first material in 7 years a six song Ep titled Demonetization.

== Artistry ==
Iron Reagan has been described as a high-energy, generally serious, sociopolitical crossover thrash band, with AllMusic stating, "although many have tried to bring the raw sound of crossover thrash back to life, Iron Reagan are one of the few bands with the pedigree to do it right." Much of the bands imagery consists of over-exaggerations of former US President Ronald Reagan.

In a 2016 interview lead singer Tony Foresta was asked the difference between Iron Reagan and his band other band Municipal Waste he stated:

I try to be a bit less humorous with Reagan stuff. I also let the other guys step in and contribute a lot more. It mixes it up a bit. I think people will be able to tell a lot more once the new Reagan and Waste albums drop next year. They’re two different beasts — that's for sure — and they are growing further and further apart sound-wise with the newer stuff we are writing.

Drummer Ryan Parrish also commented on the political theming claiming "the political stuff that is involved is not telling you how to feel, it’s just saying how we feel. It’s just explaining–This is how I see this point of view from my eyes." Their lyrics also can be sarcastic with Parrish adding "you can be socially aware and still have that sense of humor."

As for the music he Foresta added:

the best description I can say right now is that the Waste shit is dirtier [and] metal/punk-sounding, and the Reagan stuff is going in a more hardcore direction. Both things are working very well.

== Members ==
Current lineup

- Tony Foresta – vocals (2012–2020, 2025–present)
- Phil Hall – guitar (2012–2020, 2025–present)
- Adam Guilliams – guitar (2025–present)
- Paul Burnette – bass (2012–2013, 2025–present)
- Ryan Parrish – drums (2012–2020, 2025–present)

Former members

- Mark Bronzino – guitar (2012–2020)
- Rob Skotis – bass (2013–2020)

Timeline

== Discography ==
=== Studio albums ===
Year	Album details	Peak chart positions				
Year	Album details	US Heat	US Indie	US Vinyl	US Indie Store	BEL
2013	Worse Than Dead: Released: March 13, 2013; Label: A389 Recordings	—	—	—	—	—
2014	The Tyranny of Will: September 16, 2014; Label: Relapse Records	22	—	—	—	—
2017	Crossover Ministry: Released: February 3, 2017; Label; Relapse Records	4	23	8	6	93
"—" denotes a release that did not chart.

=== Demos ===
- Demo 2012 (2012, Tankcrimes)

=== EPs ===
- Spoiled Identity EP (2014, Independent)
- Dark Days Ahead EP (2018, Pop Wig Records)
- Demonetization (2026, Relapse Records)

=== Splits ===
- Exhumed/Iron Reagan (2014, Tankcrimes)
- Iron Reagan/Toxic Shock (2015, Reflections Records)
- Iron Reagan/Gatecreeper (2018, Relapse Records)
- Sacred Reich/Iron Reagan (2019, Metal Blade Records)

== See also ==
- Ronald Reagan in music
