= Platters of Splatter =

Compilation album by Exhumed
- Released: March 16, 2004
- Genre: Deathgrind
- Label: Relapse

Exhumed chronology
Anatomy Is Destiny (2003)	Platters of Splatter (2004)	Garbage Daze Re-Regurgitated (2005)

Platters of Splatter is a double CD compilation album of early recordings by deathgrind band Exhumed.

== Track listing ==
=== Disc one – First Course ===
1. "Horrendous Member Dismemberment"
2. "Septicemia (Festering Sphinctral Mallignancy Part II)"
3. "Masochistic Copromania"
4. "Necroveres: Decomposing the Inanimate"
5. "Disinterred, Digested, and Debauched"
6. "Bone Fucker"
7. "The Naked and the Dead"
8. "Necro-Transvestite"
9. "Torso"
10. "Dissecting the Caseated Omentum"
11. "Death Metal" (Possessed cover)
12. "Goreified"
13. "Emeticide"
14. "Pus Grinder"
15. "Torso 2000"
16. "Totally Fucking Dead"
17. "Dead Again"
18. "Gory Melanoma"
19. "Necro-Voyeur"
20. "Indignities to the Dead"
21. "Masterpieces"
22. "Instruments of Hell"
23. "Carneous Corneal Carbonization"
24. "Blood and Alcohol"
25. "Oozing Rectal Feast"
26. "Outro: A Decrepit Denouement"
27. "No Presents for Christmas" (King Diamond cover)
28. "Cannibal Apocalypse" (Impetigo cover)
29. "Exhume To Consume" (Carcass cover)
- Tracks 1–11: In the Name of Gore split CD with Hemdale
- Track 12: Bonus track on the limited edition of Slaughtercult, also featured on Slaughtercult... Fester Forever
- Track 13: Split 7-inch with Sanity's Dawn, and then on the split 7-inch with Gadget
- Track 14: Split 7-inch with Sanity's Dawn
- Track 15: Slaugtercult... Fester Forever, and then on the split 7-inch with Gadget
- Tracks 16–17: Totally Fucking Dead split 7-inch with Nyctophobic
- Tracks 18–19: Tales of the Exhumed split 7-inch with Retaliation
- Tracks 20–21: Indignities to the Dead split 7-inch with Pantalones Abajo Merenero
- Tracks 22–23: Instruments of Hell split 7-inch with No Comply
- Tracks 24–26: Blood and Alcohol split 7-inch with Pale Existence
- Track 27: Tribute to King Diamond compilation
- Track 28: Wizards of Gore: A Tribute to Impetigo compilation, also featured on Slaughtercult... Fester Forever
- Track 29: Requiems of Revulsion: A Tribute to Carcass compilation, also featured on Slaughtercult... Fester Forever

=== Disc two – Second Course ===
1. "Intro: A Purulent Prelude to Putrescent Pyosisification"
2. "Excreting Innards"
3. "Vagitarian"
4. "Grotesque Putrefied Brains"
5. "The Exquisite Flavour of Gastro-Anal Tripe"
6. "Sex, Drinks and Metal" (Sarcófago cover)
7. "Radiator Bitch"
8. "Excoriated, Emasculated, and Dead"
9. "Quagmire of Flesh"
10. "Puke of the Dead"
11. "Carneous Corneal Carbonization"
12. "Vagitarian"
13. "Grotesque Putrefied Brains"
14. "Pyathrotic Discorporation"
15. "Excreting Innards"
16. "Festering Sphinctral Malignancy"
17. "Perverse Innard Infestation"
18. "Coital Mutilation"
19. "Grubs"
20. "Disfigured Corpse"
21. "Cadaveric Splatter Platter"
22. "Caseating Decomposition"
23. "Embryonic Regordation"
24. "Oozing Rectal Feast"
25. "Culinary Pathology"
26. "Scrubs"
27. "Ziploc Bodybag"
- Tracks 1–6: Chords Of Chaos 4-way split CD with Ear Bleeding Disorder, Necrose, and Excreted Alive
- Tracks 7–12: Horrific Expulsion of Gore demo
- Tracks 13–15: Grotesque Putrefied Brains demo
- Tracks 16–21: Excreting Innards 7”
- Tracks 22–27: Dissecting the Caseated Omentum demo

=== Disc three – Dessert (bonus CD limited to 1000 copies) ===
1. "Cadaveric Splatter Platter"
2. "The Exquisite Flavor of Gastro-Anal Tripe"
3. "Excreting Innards"
4. "The Pallor of Unliving Flesh"
5. "Perverse Innard Infestation"
6. "Masterpieces"
7. "In My Human Slaughterhouse"
8. "Deathmask"
9. "Schizo" (Venom cover)
10. "Interlude: A Cacophonous Crescendo of Cadaverous Crepitation"
11. "Septicemia"
12. "Vagitarian"
13. "Necrovores: Decomposing the Inanimate"
14. "The Naked and the Dead"
15. "Enucleation"
16. "Bone Fucker"
17. "Rancid Fermenting Stench"
18. "Lacerated and Molested Necro-Vagina"
19. "Intercourse with a Limbless Cadaver"
20. "Interlude: A Disgorged Dirge of Dire Detrunctation"
21. "The Pallor of Unliving Flesh"
22. "Bleeding Heap of Menstrual Carnage"
23. "In the Throes of Ecstasy"
24. "Sickening Colotomic Surgery"
25. "Bleeding Heap of Menstrual Carnage"
26. "Necro-Fornicator"
27. "Material Girl" (Madonna cover)
- Track 1: Unreleased, recorded during the Instruments of Hell session
- Tracks 2–5: Originally recorded for the proposed (but never released) Cannibal Holocaust split
- Tracks 6–8: Unreleased Gore Metal demos recorded during Blood and Alcohol session
- Track 9: Unreleased Orchestrated Chaos compilation track
- Tracks 10–16: Live on KXLU FM 1997
- Tracks 17–19: Unreleased Cadaveric Platter Splatter demo tracks
- Tracks 20–24: Cadaveric Platter Splatter demo
- Track 25: Accidental Homicide 7-inch compilation
- Track 26: Deterioration of the Senses compilation
- Track 27: Unreleased Six Flags karaoke machine outtake
