= Necrocracy =

Studio album by Exhumed
- Released: August 2, 2013
- Recorded: Arcane Digital Recording in Chandler, Arizona; Trench Studios in Corona, California
- Genre: Death metal
- Length: 38:21
- Label: Relapse
- Producer: Ryan Butler, Exhumed

Exhumed chronology
| All Guts, No Glory (2011) | Necrocracy (2013) | Exhumed/ Iron Reagan (2014) |

Singles from Necrocracy
- 1. "Coins upon the Eyes" Released: June 25, 2013

Necrocracy is the sixth studio album by American death metal band Exhumed. The album was released on August 2, 2013, by Relapse Records. A music video was released for the lead single, "Coins upon the Eyes". The album was described by frontman Matt Harvey as slower, more melodic, and darker than the band's other albums. The only album to feature bassist Rob Babcock, the first to feature drummer Mike Hamilton and the return of Bud Burke who now switched to guitar as opposed to bass on Slaughtercult and Anatomy Is Destiny.

== Songwriting and recording ==
The writing for several of the songs on Necrocacy began during the preceding All Guts, No Glory session. Harvey indicated that the tempo variation heard on Necrocacy was a conscious decision that emerged while playing shows in support of All Guts, No Glory: "the live shows really convinced me that what the last album really lacked was any kind of slower, heavier groove stuff, so I knew early on that I wanted to incorporate more of that kind of shit into Necrocracy."

Relative to its previous recording sessions, Harvey describes Exhumed as "under-rehearsed" going into the studio. As a result, "a lot of the ideas on the record, fills, transitions, that kind of stuff, were really spontaneous and fresh. It was a cool contrast to so much death metal that you hear that sounds so calculated and contrived." The pacing of the album also gave Exhumed additional opportunities to explore its sound in the studio, according to Harvey: "The songs being a little slower also allowed a little more breathing room for stuff to happen. We also worked out a lot of harmonies and stuff in the recording studio, simply because we hadn't played the songs with two guitars yet in the rehearsal room, so that was fun and ended up bringing some unexpected challenges and pleasant surprises."

== Lyrics ==
With Necrocracy, Matt Harvey wrote lyrics that applied gore aesthetics to politics. He noted that the "political underpinnings" of the album were due to the fact that "the Presidential election was in full swing the whole time I was writing, and that really kind of inspired the whole direction of the lyrics."

Despite the political theme, Harvey continued his exploration of gore:

Everything is still filtered through the gore metaphor and stuff, so it's not like a Dropdead album or anything, but there is a political theme running through most of the songs. It's very anti-corporate, anti-consumerism, that kind of stuff. The system in America is just entering a very corrupt phase, a lot like the robber baron-era in the late 1800s and early 1900s – it's freedom for the strong to extort the weak, and the weak are bought off incredibly cheaply, happy to dig their own graves on a steady diet of infotainment, fast food and reality TV. Hopefully we'll have a reawakening like the early 20th century labor movement again and restore some kind of balance between the ultra-rich and the ultra-poor. So basically I touch on a lot of that kind of stuff, but by singing about blood and guts!

== Reception ==
Professional ratings
Aggregate scores
| Source | Rating |
|---|---|
| Metacritic | 82/100 |
Review scores
| Source | Rating |
| About.com | 4/5 stars |
| Brave Words & Bloody Knuckles | 9/10 |
| CraveOnline | 8.5/10 |
| Exclaim! | 9/10 |
| Loudwire | 2.5/5 stars |
| Metal Forces | 8/10 |
| Pitchfork | 7.5/10 |
| PopMatters | 8/10 |

Neil Pretorius of About.com said the "slower, groovier and much more melodically inclined" approach of Necrocacy provided for a more mature and accessible sound that puts it on par with Carcass's Surgical Steel as one of the best death/goregrind releases of the year. Praising the album's mixture of "profane ferocity" and "clinical, Heartwork-esque production", David Perri of Brave Words & Bloody Knuckles said, "Exhumed has crafted and executed what will surely be amongst the top 1 percent of 2013". Neil Arnold of Metal Forces expressed the opinion that with Necrocacy, "the Californian psychopaths have simply cemented their place alongside Carcass as leaders in a field swamped in clogged up gore".

However, the album did receive some criticism. Joe DeVita of Loudwire conceded that "there are moments of brilliance among relatively stagnant songwriting", but ultimately concluded that Necrocacy is "their most domesticated album to date".

== Track listing ==
| No. | Title | Length |
|---|---|---|
| 1. | "Coins upon the Eyes" | 4:01 |
| 2. | "The Shape of Deaths to Come" | 4:40 |
| 3. | "Necrocracy" | 4:25 |
| 4. | "Dysmorphic" | 4:36 |
| 5. | "Sickened" | 3:58 |
| 6. | "(So Passes) The Glory of Death" | 4:05 |
| 7. | "Ravening" | 3:58 |
| 8. | "The Carrion Call" | 3:48 |
| 9. | "The Rotting" | 4:50 |

Deluxe Edition bonus tracks
| No. | Title | Length |
|---|---|---|
| 10. | "The Beginning After the End" | 4:29 |
| 11. | "Not Yet Dead Enough" | 3:55 |
| 12. | "E Pluribus, Mortem" | 2:45 |
| 13. | "Chewed Up, Spit Out" | 1:29 |
| 14. | "Go for the Throat" | 0:58 |

== Personnel ==
=== Exhumed ===
- Rob Babcock − bass, vocals
- Bud Burke − guitar, vocals
- Mike Hamilton − drums
- Matt Harvey − guitar, vocals

=== Production ===
- Ryan Butler − production

== Release history ==
| Region | Date | Label | Format |
|---|---|---|---|
| Germany/Benelux | August 2, 2013 | Relapse Records | CD, LP, deluxe LP, digital |
| Worldwide | August 5, 2013 | Relapse Records | CD, LP, deluxe LP, digital |
| North America | August 6, 2013 | Relapse Records | CD, LP, deluxe LP, digital |
