= Mondo Medicale =

Studio album by Impaled
- Released: July 2, 2002
- Recorded: April 24–May 8, 2002
- Genre: Death metal, grindcore
- Length: 42:34
- Label: Deathvomit Records; Necropolis (US); Century Media (Europe)
- Producer: Impaled

Impaled chronology
The Dead Shall Dead Remain (2000)	Mondo Medicale (2002)

Mondo Medicale is the second full-length album by American death metal band Impaled. It was released in 2002, and is their second overall for the Deathvomit label. It features a spoken-word intro by bass player Ross Sewage.

== Artwork ==
Joe DiVita of Loudwire wrote: "Impaled's name is an acronym for Immoral Medical Practitioners and Licentious Evil-Doers and they're true to themselves on the cover for 'Mondo Medicale.' The words 'this is going to hurt you a lot more than it's going to hurt me' couldn't scream any louder as eyes are plucked from their sockets and the mouth is forced agape. The patient here is likely fully awake and may want to consider filing a malpractice suit if he survives."

== Reception ==
Professional ratings
Review scores
Source	Rating
Allmusic	link

William York from Allmusic gave the disc 4 of 5 stars, calling it "a fine piece of work that will both please (and, of course, disgust) fans of good-old gory death metal."

== Track listing ==
1. The Hippocritic Oath (LaBarre, McGrath) - 2:06
2. Dead Inside (McGrath, Sewage) - 3:53
3. Raise The Stakes (LaBarre, McGrath, Sewage) - 5:12
4. Operating Theatre (McGrath, Sewage) - 4:13
5. Choke On It (LaBarre, McGrath) - 3:44
6. We Belong Dead (Sewage) - 5:03
7. The Worms Crawl In (McGrath, Sewage) - 4:22
8. To Die For (LaBarre, Sewage) - 4:00
9. Rest In Feces (McGrath, Sewage) - 7:49
10. Carpe Mortem (McGrath, Sewage) - 1:52

== Personnel ==
- Andrew LaBarre: Immoral Surgeon (Lead & Rhythm Guitars, Vocals)
- Sean McGrath: General Malpraticioner (Lead & Rhythm Guitars, Vocals)
- Ross Sewage: Waste Mismanagement (Bass, Vocals)
- Raul Varela: Intoxicologist (Drums, Percussion)
- With Rachél Hopkins: Voice-Over

== Production ==
- Arranged & Produced By Impaled
- Engineered By Mauphistopholes Acevedo & Andrew LaBarre
- Mixed By Andrew LaBarre
- Mastered By Colon Davis
