= Worse Than Dead =

Studio album by Iron Reagan
- Released: March 20, 2013
- Studio: Blaze of Torment Studios; Richmond, Virginia, U.S.
- Genre: Crossover thrash
- Length: 24:40
- Label: A389
- Producer: Phil Hall

Iron Reagan chronology
Demo 2012 (2012)	Worse Than Dead (2013)	Exhumed/ Iron Reagan (2014)

Professional ratings
Review scores
Source	Rating
Exclaim!	5/10

Worse Than Dead is the first full-length album by American crossover thrash band Iron Reagan. It was released on March 20, 2013, on A389 Recordings. It is the only album to feature Paul Burnette on bass.

== Track listing ==
No.	Title	Length
1.	"Drop the Gun"	1:17
2.	"Slightly Out of Focus"	0:33
3.	"I Predict the Death of Harold Camping"	1:16
4.	"Cycle of Violence"	1:37
5.	"Eyes Piss Tears"	1:10
6.	"Insanity Plea(se)?"	0:45
7.	"A Joke A Fraud A Fake"	1:16
8.	"Rats in a Cage"	1:04
9.	"We Know You're Hiding"	1:06
10.	"Pay Check"	1:23
11.	"Midlothian Murder Mile"	1:50
12.	"The Debt Collector"	1:57
13.	"I Ripped That Testament a New Asshole"	1:15
14.	"Bodies"	1:38
15.	"Eat Shit and Live"	1:50
16.	"Two Examples"	1:31
17.	"Snake Chopper"	0:55
18.	"Warp Your Mind"	1:55
19.	"Walking Out"	1:39

== Personnel ==
Iron Reagan

- Tony Foresta – vocals
- Phil Hall – guitar
- Paul Burnette (Credited as Dr. Guitar) – bass guitar
- Ryan Parrish – drums

Production

- Produced by Phil Hall
- Mastered by Dan Randall
- Artwork by Brent Eyestone
