= The Tyranny of Will =

Studio album by Iron Reagan
- Released: September 16, 2014
- Recorded: February–April 2014
- Studio: Blaze of Torment Studios; Richmond, Virginia, U.S.
- Genre: Crossover thrash
- Length: 31:45
- Label: Relapse
- Producer: Phil Hall

Iron Reagan chronology
Spoiled Identity EP (2014)	The Tyranny of Will (2014)	Crossover Ministry (2017)

Singles from The Tyranny of Will
- 1. "Miserable Failure" Released: July 9, 2014; 2. "Four More Years" Released: August 7, 2014

The Tyranny of Will is the second studio album by American crossover thrash band Iron Reagan. Released in September 2014, it was their first under the Relapse Records label and the first to feature bassist Rob Skotis.

== Recording and release ==
The Tyranny of Will was recorded from February to April 2014 at Blaze of Torment Studios in Richmond, Virginia and mixed by Kurt Ballou at GodCity Studio in Salem, Massachusetts.

It was announced in March that the band had signed with Relapse Records, and, when their Spoiled Identity EP was released weeks later, the tracks "The Living Skull" and "Your Kid's an Asshole" were included. On July 9, the track "Miserable Failure" was released as a single through SoundCloud. The full album was released on September 16, 2014 on compact disc, LP, cassette, and via digital download and streaming. Music videos were made for the songs "Miserable Failure" and "I Won’t Go."

== Music and album cover ==
When asked about the albums length and amount of songs, lead singer Tony Foresta stated "I have a short attention span, so 40 seconds is all you can grab me for. It’s got to be really catchy if it’s a long song. I don’t like hearing the same riff 47 times. People are more intelligent than that. Sometimes people process things faster and they want to move onto something different. So this is for people with Attention Deficit Disorder."

Unlike the bands other releases the cover art does not feature former US President Ronald Reagan, it instead features a defaced Rudy Giuliani. The decision to not feature Reagan on the cover was bands in order to change things up.

== Critical reception ==
Professional ratings
Aggregate scores
Source	Rating
Metacritic	75/100
Review scores
Source	Rating
The Austin Chronicle	3.5/5 stars
Pitchfork	6.2/10
PopMatters	7/10 stars
Punknews.org	4/5 stars
Revolver	4/5

The album was met with positive reception receiving a 75/100 on Metacritic.

Revolver wrote "The Tyranny of Will’ is all aces, too: From politically-charged rippers (“In Greed We Trust,” “Patriotic Shock”) to pants-pissing punk mischief (“Eyeball Gore,” “Your Kid’s an Asshole”), Iron Reagan have got you covered." Zoe Camp of Pitchfork added "The quintet's latest, The Tyranny of Will, is a thirty-two minute blitzkrieg that surges forth like the blood spurting from the politician's neck on the album cover. Iron Reagan stick to what they know best: firing off short, potent riffs at a workmanlike pace, and letting the listener sort out the mess for themselves." Punk News added "Its sound and subject matter are relevant and modern. If there's any justice in the world, Iron Reagan will lead younger fans back to the bands that informed their sound. It would blow a lot of minds if a whole new generation discovered the original crossover bands."

== Track listing ==
No.	Title	Length
1.	"Tyranny of Will"	2:04
2.	"I Won't Go"	1:27
3.	"Eyeball Gore"	1:02
4.	"Close to Toast"	1:50
5.	"Bet on Black"	0:25
6.	"Miserable Failure"	2:15
7.	"The Living Skull"	0:42
8.	"In Greed We Trust"	1:15
9.	"Glocking Out"	0:11
10.	"Rat Shit"	1:41
11.	"U Lock the Bike Cop"	0:33
12.	"Broken Bottles"	2:08
13.	"Bleeding Frenzy"	1:32
14.	"Bored to Death"	0:52
15.	"Class Holes"	1:39
16.	"Obsolete Man"	1:38
17.	"Nameless"	1:00
18.	"Exit the Game"	1:33
19.	"Your Kid's an Asshole"	0:12
20.	"Patriotic Shock"	0:20
21.	"Bill of Fights"	1:46
22.	"Consensual Harassment"	0:31
23.	"Just Say Go"	0:50
24.	"Four More Years"	4:01

== Personnel ==
Iron Reagan

- Tony Foresta – vocals
- Mark Bronzino – guitar
- Phil Hall – guitar
- Rob Skotis – bass guitar
- Ryan Parrish – drums

Guest vocalists

- Luna Duran (on "Consensual Harassment")

Production

- Produced by Phil Hall
- Mixed by Kurt Ballou
- Mastered by Brad Boatright
- Cover design by Orion Landau
- Artwork by Alexis Mabry

== Charts ==
Chart	Peak position
US Heatseekers Albums (Billboard)	22
