= Crossover Ministry =

Studio album by Iron Reagan
- Released: February 3, 2017
- Recorded: 2016
- Studio: Blaze of Torment Studios; Richmond, Virginia, U.S.
- Genre: Crossover thrash
- Length: 28:48
- Label: Relapse
- Producer: Phil Hall

Iron Reagan chronology
| The Tyranny of Will (2014) | Crossover Ministry (2017) | Iron Reagan/ Gatecreeper (2018) |

Singles from Crossover Ministry
- 1. "A Dying World" Released: November 16, 2016; 2. "Grim Business" Released: December 12, 2016; 3. "Bleed the Fifth" Released: January 12, 2017

Professional ratings
Aggregate scores
| Source | Rating |
|---|---|
| Metacritic | 72/100 |
Review scores
| Source | Rating |
| AllMusic | 3.5/5 stars |
| Exclaim! | 8/10 |
| Kerrang! | 3/5 |
| Pitchfork | 6.7/10 |
| PopMatters | 7/10 stars |
| Punknews.org | 4.5/5 stars |

Crossover Ministry is the third studio album by American crossover thrash band Iron Reagan, released in 2017 by Relapse Records. As with previous entries, many of its lyrics contain social and political commentary, with the title track, "Megachurch", and "Dogsnotgods" in particular targeting organized religion.

== Recording and release ==
Crossover Ministry was recorded during the summer of 2016 at Blaze of Torment Studios in Richmond, Virginia and mixed by Kurt Ballou at GodCity Studio in Salem, Massachusetts. On November 16, 2016, the opening track, "A Dying World" was released as a single through SoundCloud, followed by "Grim Business" on December 12 and "Bleed the Fifth" on January 12. The full album was released by Relapse Records on February 3, 2017, on compact disc, LP, cassette, and via digital download and streaming.

== Track listing ==
| No. | Title | Length |
|---|---|---|
| 1. | "A Dying World" | 2:24 |
| 2. | "You Never Learn" | 0:43 |
| 3. | "Grim Business" | 2:29 |
| 4. | "Dead with My Friends" | 3:35 |
| 5. | "No Sell" | 0:12 |
| 6. | "Condition Evolution" | 1:56 |
| 7. | "Fuck the Neighbors" | 1:50 |
| 8. | "Power of the Skull" | 0:49 |
| 9. | "Crossover Ministry" | 2:03 |
| 10. | "More War" | 1:36 |
| 11. | "Blatant Violence" | 1:23 |
| 12. | "Parents of Tomorrow" | 0:05 |
| 13. | "Bleed the Fifth" | 2:01 |
| 14. | "Megachurch" | 1:36 |
| 15. | "Shame Spiral" | 1:36 |
| 16. | "Dogsnotgods" | 1:18 |
| 17. | "Eat or be Eaten" | 0:31 |
| 18. | "Twist Your Fate" | 2:41 |
| Total length: | | 28:48 |

== Personnel ==
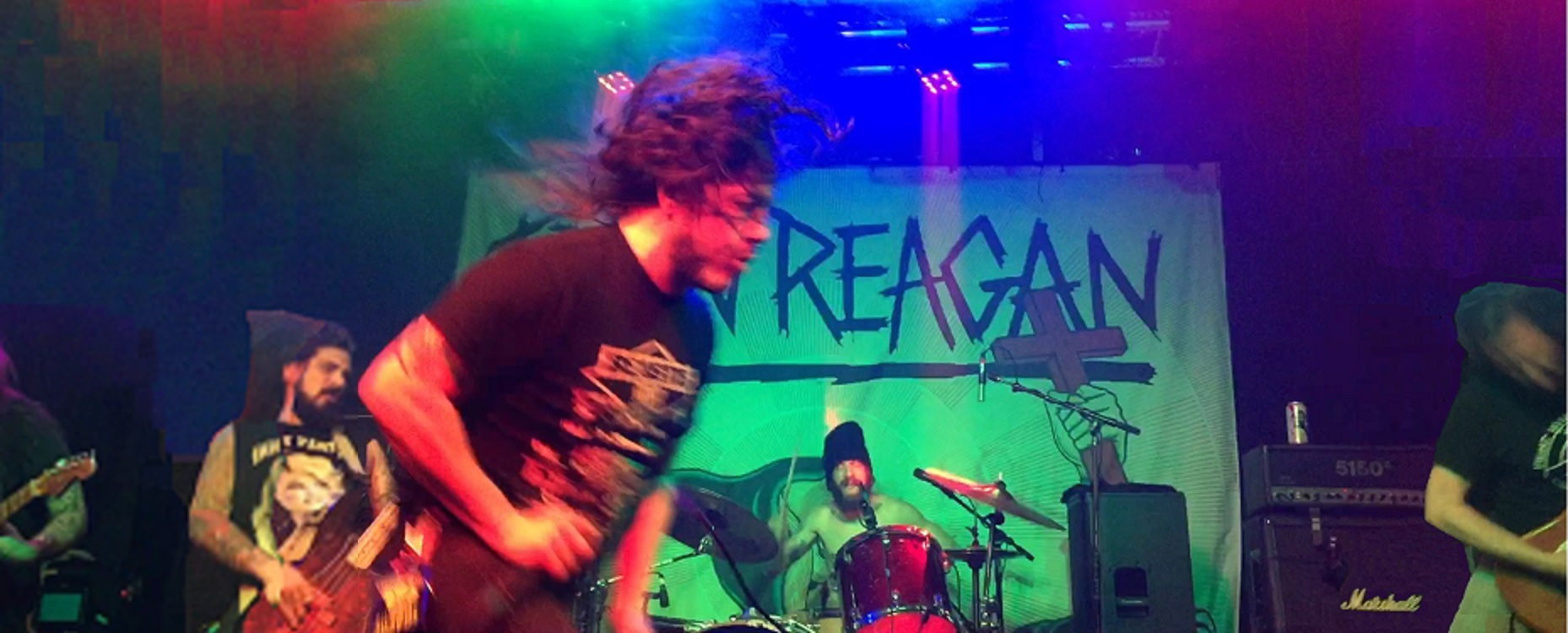
Iron Reagan performing at the Broadberry in Richmond, Virginia on February 28, 2017. Band members pictured are, from left to right: Hall, Skotis, Foresta, Parrish, Bronzino.

Iron Reagan

- Tony Foresta – vocals
- Mark Bronzino – lead guitar
- Phil Hall – rhythm guitar
- Rob Skotis – bass
- Ryan Parrish – drums

Guest vocalists

- Dave Wood (on "No Sell")
- Andreas Sandberg (on "Megachurch")
- Marissa Paternoster (on "Eat or be Eaten")

Production

- Produced by Phil Hall
- Mixed by Kurt Ballou
- Mastered by Brad Boatright
- Cover design by Orion Landau
- Artwork by David "Bonethrower" Cook

== Charts ==
| Chart | Peak position |
|---|---|
| Belgian Albums (Ultratop Flanders) | 93 |
| US Heatseekers Albums (Billboard) | 4 |
| US Independent Albums (Billboard) | 23 |
| US Indie Store Album Sales (Billboard) | 6 |
| US Vinyl Albums (Billboard) | 8 |
