= Spoiled Identity EP =

EP by Iron Reagan
- Released: April 1, 2014
- Studio: Blaze of Torment Studios; Richmond, Virginia, U.S.
- Genre: Crossover thrash
- Length: 4:56
- Label: Magic Bullet, A389
- Producer: Phil Hall

Iron Reagan chronology
Exhumed/ Iron Reagan (2014)	Spoiled Identity EP (2014)	The Tyranny of Will (2014)

Professional ratings
Review scores
Source	Rating
Punknews.org	3.5/5 stars

Spoiled Identity EP is an EP released by American crossover thrash band Iron Reagan. It was originally released as a free online download and as a 7-inch flexi disc in the June 2014 issue of Decibel. Recorded during the sessions for The Tyranny of Will, its tracks "The Living Skull", a tribute to Dave Brockie, and "Your Kid's an Asshole" were later featured as part of that album. Two additional tracks, "U Lock the Bike Cop" and "Glockin' Out" were included as bonus tracks on a 2015 limited edition 12-inch vinyl release.

== Track listing ==
No.	Title	Length
1.	"Tongue Tied"	0:11
2.	"The Living Skull"	0:38
3.	"I'm Regret"	0:09
4.	"Zero Gain"	0:12
5.	"One Shovel Short of a Funeral"	0:12
6.	"Spoiled Identity"	1:04
7.	"Your Kid's an Asshole"	0:07
8.	"The Hungry Male (of Wall St.)"	0:12
9.	"Cops Don't Like Me, I Don't Like Cops"	0:33
10.	"Declaration of War"	0:22
11.	"I Spit on Your Face/Grave"	0:25
12.	"Court Adjourned"	0:15
13.	"The Hill Witch"	0:24
14.	"U Lock the Bike Cop" (Bonus track)	0:18
15.	"Glockin' Out" (Bonus track)	0:13

== Personnel ==
Iron Reagan

- Tony Foresta – vocals
- Mark Bronzino – guitar
- Phil Hall – guitar
- Rob Skotis – bass guitar
- Ryan Parrish – drums

Production

- Produced by Phil Hall
- Mixed by Robert Caldwell
- Mastered by Scott Hull
- Artwork by Alexis Mabry
