= Exhumed/Iron Reagan =

EP by Exhumed and Iron Reagan
- Released: January 7, 2014
- Genre: Death metal; crossover thrash
- Length: 11:45
- Label: Tankcrimes
- Producer: Ryan Butler, Bob Quirk

Exhumed chronology
Necrocracy (2013)	Exhumed/Iron Reagan (2014)	Death Revenge (2017)

Iron Reagan chronology
Worse Than Dead (2013)	Exhumed/ Iron Reagan (2014)	Spoiled; Identity EP (2014)

Professional ratings
Review scores
Source	Rating
Exclaim!	6/10

Exhumed/Iron Reagan is a split EP released in 2014 by San Jose, California death metal band Exhumed and Richmond, Virginia crossover thrash band Iron Reagan.

== Track listing ==
Side one (Exhumed)
No.	Title	Length
1.	"Gravewalker"	2:29
2.	"Dead to the World"	2:18
3.	"Seeing Red" (Minor Threat cover)	0:52
4.	"Ready to Fight" (Negative Approach cover)	1:12

Side two (Iron Reagan)
No.	Title	Length
5.	"Life Beater"	0:54
6.	"Gave Up on Giving a Fuck"	1:24
7.	"Mini Lights"	1:33
8.	"Holy Water Makes Me Wet"	0:54

== Personnel ==
Exhumed

- Rob Babcock − bass guitar, vocals
- Bud Burke − guitar, vocals
- Matt Harvey − guitar, vocals
- Mike Hamilton − drums

Iron Reagan

- Tony Foresta – vocals
- Mark Bronzino – guitar
- Phil Hall – guitar
- Rob Skotis – bass guitar
- Ryan Parrish – drums

Production

- Produced by Ryan Butler, Bob Quirk
- Mixed by Ryan Butler, Rob Caldwell
- Mastered by Ryan Butler, Dan Randall
- Artwork by Jim Callahan
