= Garbage Daze Re-Regurgitated =

Studio album by Exhumed
- Released: August 30, 2005
- Genre: Death metal
- Length: 37:16
- Label: Parasitic Twin

Exhumed chronology
Platters of Splatter (2004)	Garbage Daze Re-Regurgitated (2005)	All Guts, No Glory (2011)

Garbage Daze Re-Regurgitated is the fourth album by American death metal band Exhumed. It is entirely composed of covers by artists that influenced Exhumed. The first album to feature bassist Leon del Muerte, guitarist Wes Caley and the only one to feature drummer Matt Connell. It was mastered by Scott Hull and co-produced Matt Widener.

The title is a reference to Metallica's The $5.98 E.P. - Garage Days Re-Revisited.

== Track listing ==
No.	Title	Original artist	Length
1.	"A Reflection"	The Cure	2:09
2.	"All Murder, All Guts, All Fun"	Samhain	2:05
3.	"Pay to Die"	Master	3:08
4.	"The Power Remains"	Amebix	4:49
5.	"Uninformed"	Unseen Terror	2:04
6.	"No Quarter"	Led Zeppelin	5:50
7.	"Trapped Under Ice"	Metallica	3:28
8.	"Necrophilia"	GBH	1:30
9.	"The Ghoul"	Pentagram	4:32
10.	"In Fear We Kill"	Epidemic	4:16
11.	"Twisted Face"	Sadus	2:11
12.	"Drop Dead"	Siege	1:14

== Personnel ==
- Matt Harvey – guitars, vocals
- Leon del Muerte – bass, vocals
- Matt Connell – drums
- Wes Caley – guitars

Additional Personnel

- Bud Burke - guitar on ‘Trapped Under Ice’
