= Ghoul (band) =

American extreme metal band

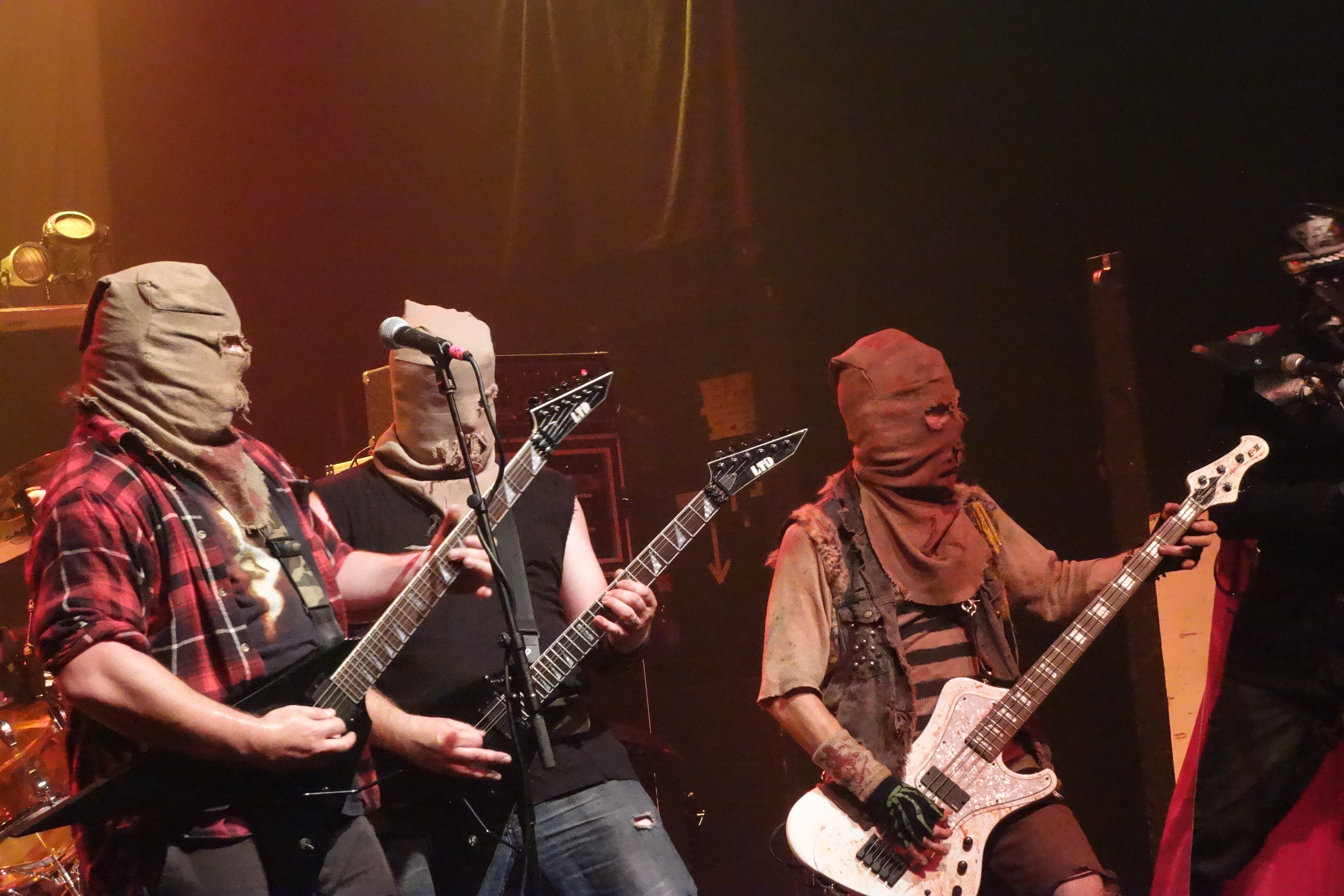
- Ghoul performing in 2016

Background information
- Origin: Oakland, California, U.S.
- Genres: Death metal; thrash metal; grindcore; shock rock
- Years active: 2001–present
- Labels: Tankcrimes; Razorback
- Members: Digestor (Sean McGrath); Cremator (Ross Sewage); Dissector (Peter Svoboda); Fermentor (Adam Houmam)
- Past members: Cremator (Andrew LaBarre); Fermentor (Dino Sommese); Dissector (Dan Randall); Fermentor (Peژ Mon)
- Website: creepsylvania.com

Ghoul is an American death/thrash metal band from Oakland, California, formed in 2001. Though the members conceal their identities, some members or past members of Ghoul play or have played in other bands such as Impaled, Dystopia, Wolves in the Throne Room, Exhumed, Phobia, Morbid Angel, Asunder and Morbosidad. Ghoul has released five studio albums.

== History ==
The band released its first album, We Came for the Dead!!!, through Razorback Records in 2002. It followed with Maniaxe in 2003 and Splatterthrash in 2006. Across these releases, Ghoul developed a continuing fictional storyline that became part of its identity.

The story takes place in Creepsylvania, an invented country whose inhabitants include the band’s characters. Elements of this setting also appear in its concerts, which feature costumes, fake blood, and staged encounters with monsters and robots. www.kerrang.com

In 2011, Ghoul released its fourth album, Transmission Zero, through Tankcrimes Records. The album continued the band’s narrative and placed greater emphasis on its thrash metal influences. A review in Lambgoat noted that some earlier recordings had leaned more toward death metal and grindcore.

Ghoul explored surf music on the six-track EP Hang Ten, released in 2014. The mostly instrumental recording was prepared for Record Store Day and recorded by Salvador Raya at Earhammer Studios in Oakland, with mastering by Dan Randall. www.horrorsociety.com

The band’s fifth studio album, Dungeon Bastards, was released by Tankcrimes on July 29, 2016. music.apple.com That year, Ghoul was announced as one of the supporting acts on Carcass’s American “One Foot in the Grave” tour, alongside Crowbar and Night Demon.

According to Kerrang!, Dungeon Bastards brought Ghoul and Tankcrimes their first appearances on Billboard’s Heatseekers and Hard Rock charts. The magazine also reported that the band had opened for Cannibal Corpse and GWAR.

In 2018, Ghoul released a split single with rapper Ill Bill, featuring “Pentagram” and “Splatterthrash 2: Thrash Damage.” The following year, the band announced a crowdfunding campaign for Ghoul: Born to Kill, a horror comic written and illustrated by Ross Sewage. The project expanded the Creepsylvania storyline through stories involving the band and characters from its stage shows. Its planned format included a color cover and 24 black-and-white pages, drawing on the tradition of EC and Warren horror comics.

Tankcrimes released Ghoul’s live album Live in the Flesh in 2021. www.tankcrimes.com On February 2, 2024, the band released the five-track EP Noxious Concoctions. Recorded by Scott Evans at Antisleep Audio and Sharkbite Studios, it included four original songs and a cover of Funerot’s “1-900-DTH-LINE.” The release was accompanied by announced North American tour dates with Municipal Waste, Necrot, and Dead Heat during February and March 2024. www.metalsucks.net

== Style ==
Ghoul plays a blend of thrash metal and grindcore with death metal vocals and lyrics. Kerrang! described the band as "cannibal thrashers".

The masked members go by the stage names Digestor, Cremator, Dissector and Fermentor. The band's lyrics describe a large cast of characters, including themselves. Much of the known information concerning the band comes from the "Curio Shop Owner", one of the many characters mentioned in their songs. They claim to be mutants that come from Creepsylvania.

== Members ==
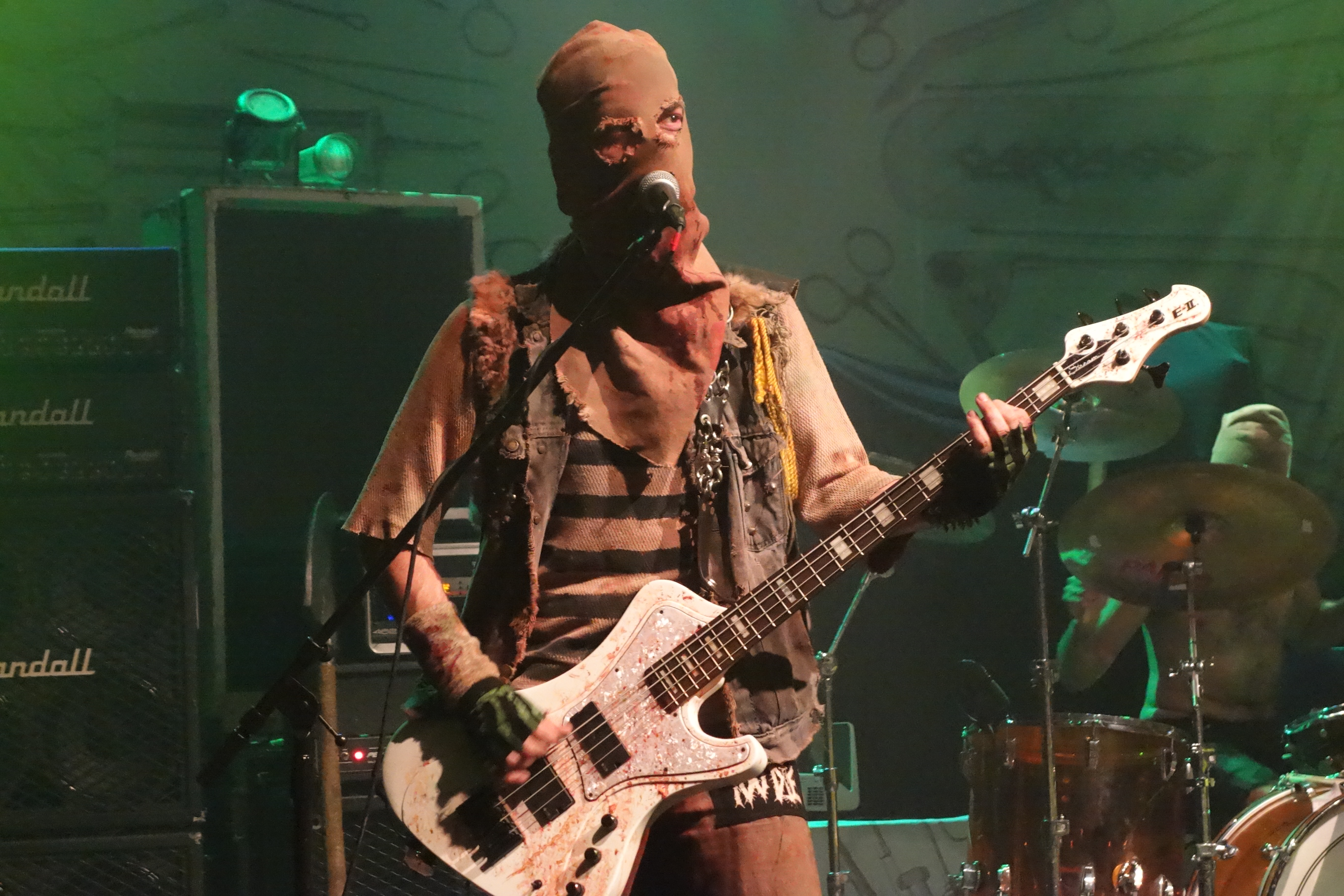
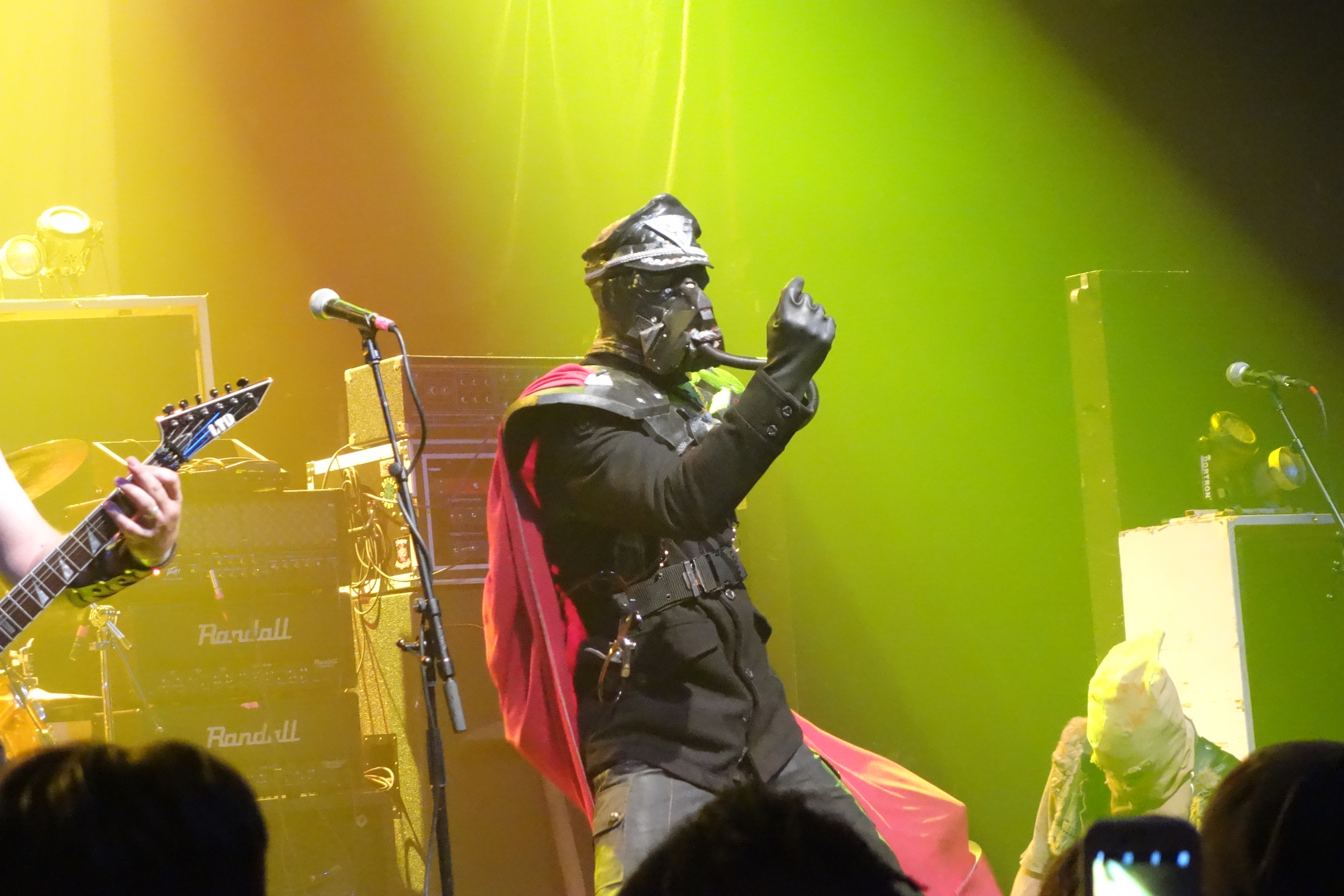
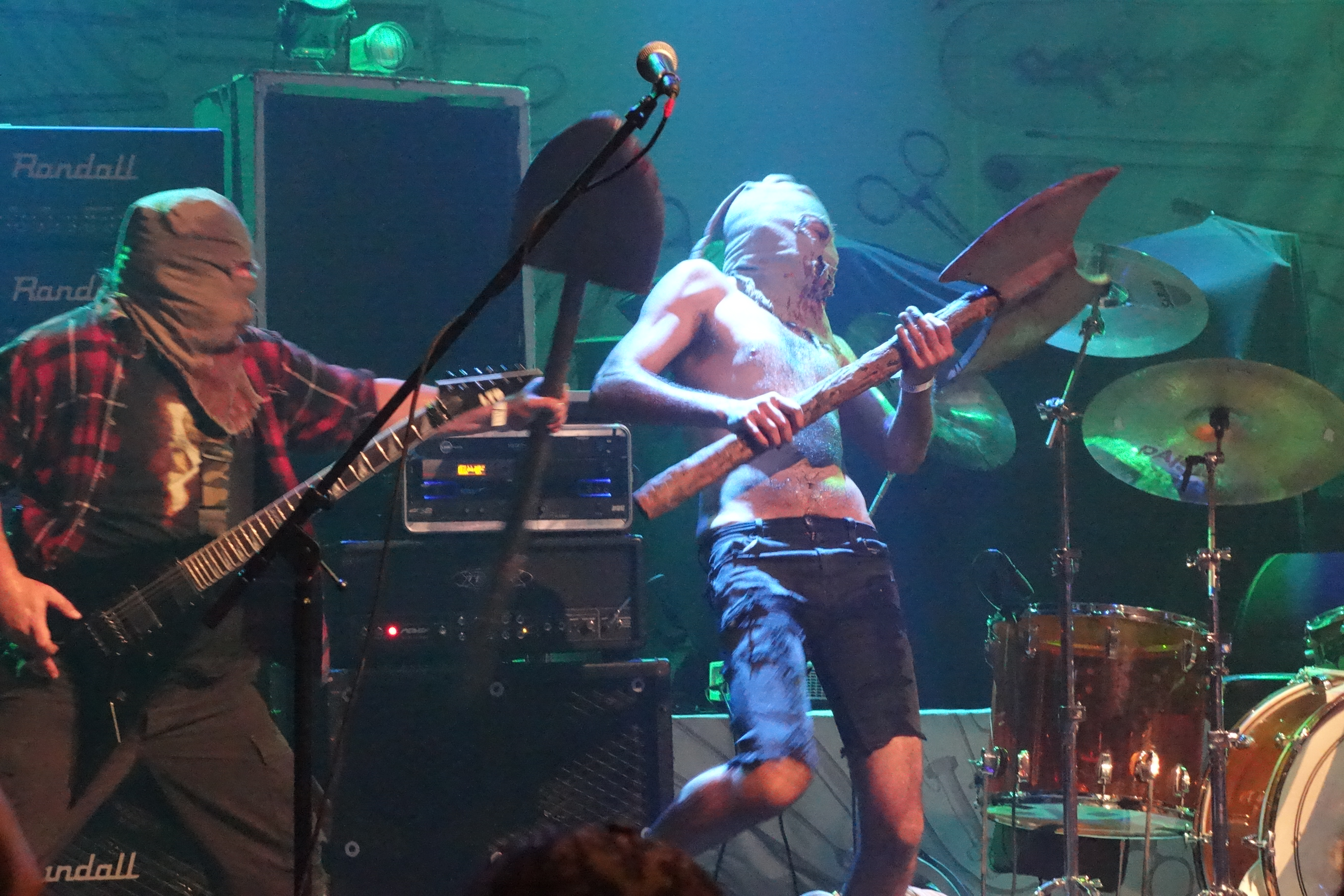
Ghoul performing in 2016
- Sean "Digestor" McGrath – lead guitar, lead vocals (2001–present)
- Ross "Cremator" Sewage – bass, backing vocals (2003–present)
- Peter "Dissector" Svoboda – rhythm guitar, backing vocals (2014–present)
- Adam "Fermentor" Houman – drums, backing vocals (2022–present)

=== Former members ===
- Justin "Dr. X" Green – drums (2001)
- Raul "Fermentor" Varela – drums (2001–2004)
- Andrew "Cremator" LaBarre – rhythm guitar, bass, backing vocals (2001–2003)
- Dino "Fermentor" Sommese – drums, backing vocals (2004–2013)
- Dan "Dissector" Randall – rhythm guitar, backing vocals (2004–2014)
- Peژ "Fermentor" Mon – drums (2013–2017)
- Justin "Fermentor" Ennis – drums, backing vocals (2017–2020)

=== Live crew/character performers ===
- Scott Bryan
- Peter "Pove" Povey
- Scotty Heath
- Dave Swafford
- Peter "Hmong the Living" Vang

=== Characters ===
- Mr. Fang – The Curio Shop Owner
- The Swamp Hag – Witch
- The Mutant Mutilator – aka The Gore Boar
- Killbot – Mark I and Mark II (with Walt Disney's brain)
- The Ghoul Hunter
- Kogar the Destructor
- Baron Samedi
- Constance Spoogeous – Death Humper – Holocaust survivor – Child Predator – Salvation Army Bell Ringer
- The Grand Basilisk – The Cult Leader
- Skuz – Crusty punk and owner of the Dog Armpit
- Kreeg – Motorcycle and surfing enthusiast, monster
- Commandant Yanish Dobrunkum – Ruler of Creepsylvania
- Bernard Fussbottom – Tech entrepreneur and inventor of the I-Eye Mark I

== Discography ==
=== Studio albums ===
- We Came for the Dead!!! (2002, Razorback Records)
- Maniaxe (2003, Razorback Records)
- Splatterthrash (2006, Razorback Records) (reissue 2011, Tankcrimes)
- Transmission Zero (2011, Tankcrimes)
- Hang Ten (EP) (2014, Tankcrimes)
- Dungeon Bastards (2016, Tankcrimes)
- Noxious Concoctions (EP) (2024 Tankcrimes)

=== Live albums ===
- Live In The Flesh (2021, Tankcrimes)

=== Compilation and split albums ===
- We Came for the Dead & Maniaxe (2008, Tankcrimes)
- Ghoul / Brody's Militia (2008, Rescued from Life Records)
- Splatterhash (split with Cannabis Corpse, 2013, Tankcrimes)
- Ill Bill / Ghoul (2018, Tankcrimes)

=== Demo ===
- Ghoul's Night Out (2001, self-released demo)
1. "Graveyard Mosh"
2. "Ghoul"
3. "Rot Gut"
4. "Ghouls Night Out" (Misfits cover)

=== Single ===
- "Kids in America" (2012, Tankcrimes; Kim Wilde cover)
- "Nazi Smasher" (2020, Tankcrimes)
