= Transmission Zero =

Studio album by Ghoul
- Released: November 8, 2011
- Genres: Thrash metal, death metal
- Length: 39:49
- Label: Tankcrimes
- Producer: Ghoul

Ghoul chronology
Splatterthrash (2006)	Transmission Zero (2011)	Dungeon Bastards (2016)

Transmission Zero is an album released in November 2011 by Ghoul. It is the first album under their new label, Tankcrimes records.

Anthony Fantano of The Needle Drop rated it an 8 out of 10.

== Track listing ==
All tracks are written by Ghoul.

No.	Title	Length
1.	"The Lunatic Hour" (instrumental)	4:06
2.	"Off with Their Heads"	3:16
3.	"Destructor"	3:05
4.	"Death in the Swamp"	1:34
5.	"The Mark of Voodoo"	2:52
6.	"Brain Jerk"	4:30
7.	"Blood Feast"	3:43
8.	"Morning of the Mezmetron"	8:17
9.	"Transmission Zero"	3:29
10.	"Tooth and Claw"	2:28
11.	"Metallicus Ex Mortis"	2:29
Total length:		39:49

== Personnel ==
Ghoul

- Digestor - vocals, guitars
- Dissector - vocals, guitars
- Cremator - vocals, bass
- Fermentor - drums, vocals
