= Anatomy Is Destiny =

Studio album by Exhumed
- Released: July 29, 2003
- Genre: Death metal; deathgrind
- Length: 45:23
- Label: Relapse
- Producer: Neil Kernon

Exhumed chronology
Slaughtercult (2000)	Anatomy Is Destiny (2003)	Platters of Splatter (2004)

Professional ratings
Review scores
Source	Rating
Allmusic	4.5/5 stars
Aversion Online	8/10
MetalStorm	9/10

Anatomy Is Destiny is the third full-length album by American death metal band Exhumed. The album is regarded as Exhumed's "most critically acclaimed" album. The title of the album is taken from a well-known quote by Sigmund Freud. The only album to feature Bud Burke on bass before switching to guitar on Necrocracy. The last album to feature guitarist Mike Beams and drummer Col Jones.

== Track listing ==
All songs written by Matt Harvey, except where noted.

No.	Title	Writer(s)	Length
1.	"Anatomy Is Destiny"		1:09
2.	"Waxwork"		4:34
3.	"The Matter of Splatter"	Harvey, Mike Beams	3:41
4.	"Under the Knife"		5:00
5.	"Consuming Impulse"		4:21
6.	"Grotesqueries"	Harvey, Beams	3:59
7.	"In the Name of Gore"		4:48
8.	"Arclight"	Harvey, Beams	3:18
9.	"Nativity Obscene (A Nursery Chyme)"		3:43
10.	"Death Walks Behind You"		3:31
11.	"A Song for the Dead"		6:59

== Personnel ==
- Matt Harvey – guitars, vocals
- Mike Beams – guitars, vocals
- Bud Burke – bass
- Col Jones – drums
- Sakara Birdong – additional vocals

=== Production ===
- Neil Kernon – production, engineering, mixing
- Scott Hull – mastering
