= Maniaxe =

Studio album by Ghoul
- Released: June 24, 2003
- Genres: Death metal, thrash metal
- Length: 34:42
- Label: Razorback Records

Ghoul chronology
We Came for the Dead!!! (2002)	Maniaxe (2003)	Splatterthrash (2006)

Maniaxe is Ghoul's second album, released in 2003 by Razorback Records. It is the follow-up to their debut album, We Came for the Dead!!!. As before, the lyrics in this album continue the band's storyline, and introduces Ghoul's new nemesis, "The Ghoul Hunter." Maniaxe also introduces a fourth member to Ghoul, "Dissector".

The last track "What a Wonderful World" is a parody of Louis Armstrong's hit, with the lyrics perverted into an observation of nuclear war.

== Track listing ==
All tracks are written by Ghoul, except where noted.

No.	Title	Length
1.	"Pleasant Screams / Forbidden Crypts"	4:18
2.	"Maggot Hatchery"	3:33
3.	"Sewer Chewer"	3:37
4.	"Ghoul Hunter"	3:53
5.	"Numbskull"	3:24
6.	"Boneless"	3:11
7.	"Maniaxe"	3:17
8.	"Mechanized Death"	3:30
9.	"The End?"	2:56
10.	"What a Wonderful World" (Louis Armstrong cover)	2:40
Total length:		34:42

== Personnel ==
- Cremator - Vocals, Bass
- Dissector - Vocals, Guitars
- Digestor - Vocals, Guitars
- Fermentor - Drums
