= Demo 2012 =

Demo album by Iron Reagan
- Released: January 16, 2012
- Studio: Blaze of Torment Studios; Richmond, Virginia, U.S.
- Genre: Crossover thrash
- Length: 5:04
- Label: Tankcrimes
- Producer: Phil Hall

Iron Reagan chronology
Demo 2012 (2012)	Worse Than Dead (2013)

Demo 2012 is the debut album by Richmond, Virginia-based crossover thrash band Iron Reagan.

== Track listing ==
No.	Title	Length
1.	"Paycheck"	1:20
2.	"Eat Shit and Live"	0:51
3.	"Artificial Saints"	1:21
4.	"Running Out of Time"	1:31
Total length:		5:04

== Personnel ==
Iron Reagan

- Tony Foresta – vocals
- Mark Bronzino – guitar
- Phil Hall – guitar
- Paul Burnette – bass guitar
- Ryan Parrish – drums

Production

- Produced by Phil Hall
- Mastered by Dan Randall
- Artwork by Brandon Ferrell, Richard Minino
