= Splatterthrash =

Studio album by Ghoul
- Released: June 1, 2006
- Genres: Thrash metal, Death Metal
- Length: 41:20
- Label: Razorback
- Producers: Ghoul, Dan Randall

Ghoul chronology
Maniaxe (2003)	Splatterthrash (2006)	Transmission Zero (2011)

Splatterthrash is an album released in June 2006 by Ghoul. The album features many surf guitar riffs, as well as thrash metal riffs.

== Story and Concept ==
The album's lyric sheet is presented in a comic book-like fashion, with talk boxes narrating the story. The album's concept begins with "Bury the Hatchet." This tells of a cult, which Ghoul defeats, attacking Ghoul in an effort to take the crystal skull in their possession. Later, the cult comes back with Killbot, defeats Ghoul, and takes over Creepsylvania. Creepsylvania becomes a fundamentalist Christian state while Ghoul waits to get revenge.

== Critical reception ==
In a review for Last Rites, Chris Chellis called it "a potential member of the Top 3 Albums of 2006".

== Track listing ==
All tracks are written by Ghoul.

No.	Title	Length
1.	"Into the Catacombs"	4:33
2.	"As Your Casket Closes"	3:36
3.	"Bury the Hatchet"	2:55
4.	"Merde!"	2:22
5.	"Cult of the Hunter"	3:35
6.	"Mutant Mutilator"	3:42
7.	"Psychoplasm"	2:57
8.	"Splatterthrash"	2:47
9.	"Gutbucket Blues"	2:21
10.	"Rise, Killbot, Rise!!!"	5:26
11.	"Life of the Living Dead"	3:40
12.	"Baron Samedi"	3:26
Total length:		41:20

== Personnel ==
Ghoul

- Digestor - vocals, guitars
- Dissector - vocals, guitars
- Cremator - vocals, bass
- Fermentor - drums, vocals

Additional personnel

- Baron Samedi - Didjeridoo
- Mr. Fang - Theremin and Electric Organ
- Dan Randall - Mastering
- Jason Kocol - Engineering
- Sal Raya - Engineering
- Heather Necker - Photography
