= Gore Metal (album) =

Studio album by Exhumed
- Released: October 27, 1998
- Recorded: Burnt Offering Studio, July 1998
- Genre: Deathgrind
- Length: 43:29
- Label: Relapse

Exhumed chronology
Gore Metal (1998)	Slaughtercult (2000)

Gore Metal is the debut studio album by American death metal band Exhumed, released by Relapse Records on October 27, 1998. It is their only album until 2017's Death Revenge to feature bassist Ross Sewage.

== Background ==
According to founding member Matt Harvey, Gore Metal was the album where Exhumed developed its vision, although he conceded that "we were still very loose and sloppy and didn't really have a handle on recording at all. Listening back to that record, I like most of the songs, but the production is awful sounding."

The band recorded several songs for the album that were lost when producer James Murphy, then suffering from brain cancer and acting "erratically", was evicted from his studio in Oakland.

== Track listing ==
All songs written by Matt Harvey, except where noted.

No.	Title	Writer(s)	Length
1.	"Necromaniac"		2:32
2.	"Open the Abscess"		3:18
3.	"Postmortem Procedures"		3:21
4.	"Limb from Limb"	Harvey, Ross Sewage	2:32
5.	"Enucleation"	Harvey, Sewage, Alex Lopez	4:00
6.	"Casketkrusher"		3:25
7.	"Deathmask"		2:52
8.	"In My Human Slaughterhouse"		2:02
9.	"Sepulchural Slaughter"		3:03
10.	"Vagitarian II"		3:41
11.	"Blazing Corpse"		2:05
12.	"Deadest of the Dead"		5:52
13.	"Sodomy and Lust" (Sodom cover)	Tom Angelripper	4:48

== Personnel ==
=== Exhumed ===
- Matt Harvey – guitars, screamed vocals
- Col Jones – drums
- Ross Sewage – bass, growled vocals
- Mike Beams – guitars

=== Additional personnel ===
- Dave Shirk – mastering
- James Murphy – mixing
- Maurice Acevedo – engineering
- Brian Henry – design, layout
