= The Dead Shall Dead Remain =

Album by Impaled

Studio album by Impaled
- Released: February 22, 2000
- Genre: Death metal, grindcore
- Length: 42:34
- Label: Deathvomit Records
- Producer: Impaled

The Dead Shall Dead Remain is the first album of the American death metal band Impaled.

Chronicles of Chaos rated the album four out of ten.

== Track listing ==
The Dead Shall Dead Remain track listing
No.	Title	Length
1.	"Introduction"	1:26
2.	"Fæces of Death"	4:10
3.	"Flesh & Blood"	3:16
4.	"Trocar"	5:31
5.	"Spirits of the Dead"	3:37
6.	"Immaculate Defecation"	3:13
7.	"Fæcal Rites"	3:49
8.	"Back to the Grave"	4:45
9.	"All That Rots"	3:51
10.	"Gorenography"	4:55
11.	"Blood Bath"	4:59
12.	"Untitled"	26:04
Total length:		69:36
