= Exhumed (band) =

American deathgrind band

- Origin: San Jose, California, U.S.
- Genres: Deathgrind; death metal; goregrind (early)
- Years active: 1990–2005; 2010–present
- Labels: 625 Thrashcore, Relapse
- Members: Matt Harvey; Mike Hamilton; Sebastian Philips; Ross Sewage
- Past members: Rob Babcock; Bud Burke; Wes Caley; Derrel Houdashelt (aka D.Attacker); Jake Giardina; Matt Ferri; Mike Beams; Leon del Muerte; Ben Marrs; Colten Lavallee; Matt Widener; Matt Connell; Col Jones; John Longstreth; Danny Walker

Exhumed is an American death metal band formed in San Jose, California, currently signed to Relapse Records. It revolves around leader, vocalist-guitarist, and sole constant member, Matt Harvey. The band has released nine albums and eight split 7-inch singles. They were formed in 1990, went on hiatus in 2005, and reformed in 2010.

== Background ==
=== Early history (1990–2000) ===
Fifteen-year-old Matt Harvey formed Exhumed in 1990. Exhumed spent much of the ensuing decade releasing demos, split CDs, and EPs. Harvey explained that he was influenced by Carcass, Impetigo, Repulsion and Terrorizer as well as early albums by Entombed. The band played goregrind at that time.

The band recorded their debut album, Gore Metal,in 1998. The album blended death metal and grindcore and influenced later bands who played the same type of music. Harvey said that Gore Metal was the album where Exhumed developed his vision, although he conceded that "we were still very loose and sloppy and didn't really have a handle on recording at all. Listening back to that record, I like most of the songs, but the production is awful sounding." Harvey said the band recorded several songs for the album that were lost when producer James Murphy, then suffering from brain cancer and acting "erratically", was evicted from his studio in Oakland.

=== Middle period and hiatus (2001–2009) ===
This led to the band touring the United States and making several festival appearances. The band's line-up continued to change during, and after, the release of their second album, Slaughtercult, in August 2000. Harvey said that Slaughtercult was "the album where we came closest to achieving our goal – just a brutal, simple, direct group of songs that were very up-front and live sounding." He further noted the band's pride over the lack of double bass on the album, in contrast to contemporary death metal trends. In support of Slaughtercult, the band did three US tours, and their first proper European tour, including co-headlining festivals like Fuck the Commerce and Obscene Extreme. The band also appeared at the Wacken Open Air festival.

The band evolved further with their third album, Anatomy Is Destiny (2003), which added more sophisticated arrangements, production and instrumentation. Bassist Leon del Muerte replaced Bud Burke soon after the album was recorded. Harvey described the album as "a big step forward", but retrospectively criticized the album for its lack of memorable choruses. He said of Anatomy Is Destiny, "in many ways it's our best album, but in just as many, we missed the mark on a bunch of things."

Co-founder and drummer Col Jones departed Exhumed in 2003, which affected the creative chemistry of the band. Harvey recalled, "After he (Jones) left it was a big adjustment. I was trying to run shit on my own creatively and logistically. The anatomy of the band just dissolved and everything fell apart." As Harvey attempted to rebuild the line-up, Exhumed issued a double CD compilation of their early recordings titled Platters of Splatter. After touring North America, Europe, Japan, and Australia, guitarist Mike Beams departed and new guitarist Wes Caley and drummer Matt Connell made their debut. Exhumed then completed recording an album of cover songs titled Garbage Daze Re-Regurgitated. Harvey later explained that the album was intended as a "stopgap" album, although the band's subsequent hiatus put the band on hold longer than planned. Harvey later recalled:

I was pretty burnt on Exhumed. The fact that the band hadn't really gotten any bigger from album to album, along with the Anatomy line-up falling apart were really frustrating, especially in light of how much work we had done. I felt like without Col in Exhumed, the band didn't really have any credibility any more, and I was just tired of teaching new people the songs and hoping that they would "get" where the band was coming from.

During the hiatus, Harvey played in Dekapitator, Gravehill, and Scarecrow. Harvey, later remarking that "the passion for music didn't go away but my passion for Exhumed went away", came to regret that the band's last recording would be a covers album and, feeling rejuvenated, decided to reform Exhumed to record a new studio album.

=== Reunion & Departure of Bud Burke (2010–present) ===
In an interview conducted shortly after announcing that Exhumed would reform, Harvey remarked that "After a few years off and away from the death metal scene, I feel rejuvenated and ready to hack, maim, and kill once again. I wanted this to be a continuation of what the band was doing and was on its way to doing, not a reunion or some weird nostalgia thing."

In 2010, the band recorded All Guts, No Glory. The album line up was Harvey on guitars and high vocals, del Muerte on bass and low vocals, Caley on guitar, and Danny Walker on drums. The musical approach taken on All Guts, No Glory was, according to Harvey, intentionally based on the band members' favoured elements of previous Exhumed records: "We all agreed that the period of Exhumed we liked the best was Slaughtercult and wanted to mix that with the technicality and melody of Anatomy."

The band toured extensively, although del Muerte and Walker left the band to complete Murder Construct's debut album. They were replaced by Bob Babcock and Mike Hamilton (Deeds of Flesh), respectively.

In 2012, guitarist Caley was replaced by Bud Burke, and the band recorded Necrocracy, which was released by Relapse Records on August 2, 2013. Harvey described the album as being "not quite as fast" as All Guts, No Glory.

On November 6, 2014, the band appeared on the season 3 premiere of The Eric Andre Show.

In November 2014, Matt Ferri replaced Rob Babcock on bass.

In 2015, Matt Ferri left and Ross Sewage rejoined the band on bass.

The band released their seventh album Death Revenge on October 13, 2017.

In November 2018, Burke officially left the band after being unable to tour since 2017. Sebastian Phillips, who had been filling in for Burke during this time, was simultaneously announced as the full-time replacement guitarist. Harvey commented on the situation:

"Bud simply wasn't available for touring as much as we needed him to be, it was that simple. He and I have been friends for years, and we both understood that this move made sense for the band – there were no hard feelings whatsoever... We're definitely going back to into the studio next year. We have a ton of material that's shaping up to be really aggressive, and we're pumped to get Baz contributing to the writing and recording side of things as well!"

— Matt Harvey, 2018

In August 2019, the band announced their eighth studio album Horror, which was followed by the singles "Ravenous Cadavers" on August 13, "Naked, Screaming, and Covered in Blood" on September 10, and "Playing With Fear" on September 30. The full album was released through Relapse Records on October 4, 2019.

In August 2022, the band announced their ninth studio album To the Dead followed by the music video for the first single "Drained of Color." This announcement also coincided with the announcement of a 2022 US tour with support from Hulder, Vitriol, Molder, and Castrator on select dates.

Drained of Color was fully released through Relapse Records on October 21, 2022.

On April 20 2023, the band was announced as one of the opening acts for Cavalera, alongside the band Incite, for a fall 2023 US tour.

On August 28 2023, the band surprise released an EP entitled Beyond the Dead, which featured four new songs and four live cuts taken from some of the band's recent live shows. In May and June 2024, they headlined the Decayed Decades tour throughout the US.

The band are currently embarking on a North American tour which will run throughout late 2026, with support from Jarhead Fertilizer, Savage Master and Molder.

== Artistry ==
AllMusic describes the bands style as death metal, heavy metal and grindcore adding that the band "have honed their brand of gore-obsessed death metal with a tongue-in-cheek flair and an overall musical approach often reminiscent of Carcass." When asked about the band’s musical style vocalist and guitarist Matt Harvey described it as "earache death metal and grind, mid ’80s evil thrash and proto-death metal, a pinch of intense hardcore, and traditional metal for dynamics."

=== Song writing ===
Over the years of their existence, Exhumed's approach to songwriting has become increasingly traditional in its structure and has been greatly influenced by Metal acts such as Visage. Main songwriter Matt Harvey said:

On any song that we're writing, the first thing I think is, "Where's the chorus? What's the chorus? Where's the hook?" Then we've got something to build around. I'm very into the regular pop format of verse-chorus-verse-chorus-bridge-verse-chorus and variations thereof. To me, the chorus has to be the thing that grabs me and hooks me in – especially in death metal, because there's no vocal melody. Yeah, you've got riffs, but you have to have something to hook the listener in, to bring them back, to keep them listening again and again and again. That's really the goal, to create music that I would want to listen to five years later. For me, it's all about choruses and trying to write catchy songs.

=== Lyrical themes ===
Exhumed's lyrics focus on gore themes. However, the band uses this thematic lens in an allegorical fashion. Lyricist Matt Harvey said:

One thing I like about gore is that it gives you a set of aesthetics to work with to use as an allegory or metaphor. Even as far back as the first album, a lot of the songs are metaphors for different things. We have songs about consumerism and songs about relationships and songs about politics. Instead of me coming off like a whiny bitch complaining about society, I'm able to put it across in a way that's really allegorical and has its own entertainment value without having any deeper context...the gore metaphor keeps me from becoming a preachy, pretentious douchebag.

On Necrocracy, Harvey wrote lyrics that applied the gore theme to political subject matter, such as a critique of American corporatism and consumerism.

== Personnel ==
=== Current ===
- Matt Harvey – vocals, guitars (1990–2005, 2010–present)
- Ross Sewage – vocals (1994–1999, 2015–present), bass (1995–99, 2015-present)
- Mike Hamilton – drums (2011–present)
- Sebastian Philips – guitars (2018–present)

=== Former ===
- Bud Burke – bass, vocals (1999–2003), guitars, vocals (2012–2018)
- Rocky Torrecillas – guitar (1990–1991)
- Derrel Houdashelt – guitar (1991–1996)
- Leon del Muerte – guitar, vocals (1996–1997), bass, vocals (2003–2005, 2010–2011)
- Mike Beams – guitar, vocals (1998–2004)
- Wes Caley – guitar (2004–2005, 2010–2012)
- Peter Rossman – bass (1990–1991)
- Ben Marrs – bass (1991–1992, died in 2024)
- Jake Giardina – vocals (1991–93), bass (1993)
- Matt Widener – bass, vocals (1994–1995)
- Rob Babcock – bass, vocals (2012–2014)
- Matt Ferri – bass, vocals (2014–2015)
- Col Jones – drums (1990–2003)
- Danny Walker – drums (2003–2004, 2010–2011)
- Matt Connell – drums (2004–2005)

== Discography ==
=== Albums ===
- Gore Metal (1998)
- Slaughtercult (2000)
- Anatomy Is Destiny (2003)
- Garbage Daze Re-Regurgitated (2005)
- All Guts, No Glory (2011)
- Necrocracy (2013)
- Death Revenge (2017)
- Horror (2019)
- To the Dead (2022)
- Red Asphalt (2026)

=== EPs and splits ===
- Excreting Innards (7-inch) (1992)
- Split cassette with Haemorrhage (1995)
- In the Name of Gore (split CD with Hemdale) (1996)
- Blood And Alcohol (split 7-inch with Pale Existence) (1996)
- Chords of Chaos (4-way split with Ear Bleeding Disorder, Necrose, and Excreted Alive) (1997)
- Instruments of Hell (split 7-inch with No Comply) (1997)
- Indignities to the Dead (split 7-inch with Pantalones Abajo Marinero) (1997)
- Totally Fucking Dead (split 7-inch with Nyctophobic) (1998)
- Tales of the Exhumed (split 7-inch with Retaliation) (1998)
- Split 7-inch with Sanity's Dawn (2000)
- Split 7-inch with Gadget (2001)
- Deceased in the East/Extirpated Live Emanations (live split 10-inch with Aborted) (2003)
- Something Sickened This Way Comes / To Clone and to Enforce (split 7-inch and mini-CD with Ingrowing) (2006)
- Exhumed/Iron Reagan (2014) Tankcrimes Records
- Twisted Horror (10-inch split with Gruesome) (2020) Relapse Records
- Worming (2021)
- Beyond the Dead (2023)

=== Compilations ===
- Platters of Splatter (double album) (2004)
