= Slaughtercult =

Studio album by Exhumed
- Released: August 15, 2000
- Recorded: Trident Studios, Concord, California from May 2–9, 2000, and Soundlab Studios, Örebro, Sweden from May 12–14, 2000
- Genre: Deathgrind
- Length: 34:56
- Label: Relapse

Exhumed chronology
| Gore Metal (1998) | Slaughtercult (2000) | Anatomy Is Destiny (2003) |

Professional ratings
Review scores
| Source | Rating |
|---|---|
| AllMusic | 4.0/5 stars |

Slaughtercult is the second full-length studio album by American death metal band Exhumed. It contained backup vocals from Henke Forss from Dawn and guest lead guitars on one song by Mieszko Talarczyk of Nasum.

== Overview ==
Founding member Matt Harvey said that Slaughtercult was "the album where we came closest to achieving our goal – just a brutal, simple, direct group of songs that were very up-front and live sounding." He further noted the band's pride over the lack of double bass on the album, in contrast to contemporary death metal trends. Slaughtercult also reduced the quantity of sound effects and samples in comparison to Gore Metal; Harvey attributed this to the departure of Ross Sewage, who had taken a leading role in the implementation of these sound elements in the past. Harvey said, "We didn't feel like they [the sound effects and samples] fit in with the overall direction of the material and the feel of the album and we just wanted to make something 100% over-the-top and in-your-face."

In support of Slaughtercult, the band toured the US three times, and embarked on their first proper European tour, including co-headlining festivals like Fuck the Commerce and Obscene Extreme. The band also appeared at the Wacken Open Air festival.

== Track listing ==
All songs written by Matt Harvey, except where noted.

| No. | Title | Writer(s) | Length |
|---|---|---|---|
| 1. | "Decrepit Crescendo" | | 2:26 |
| 2. | "Forged in Fire (Formed in Flame)" | Harvey, Mike Beams | 2:57 |
| 3. | "A Lesson in Pathology" | | 3:25 |
| 4. | "This Axe Was Made to Grind" | Harvey, Bud Burke | 2:24 |
| 5. | "Carnal Epitaph" | | 3:00 |
| 6. | "Dinnertime in the Morgue" | | 2:05 |
| 7. | "Fester Forever" | Harvey, Beams | 3:39 |
| 8. | "Deep Red" | | 3:09 |
| 9. | "Infester" | Harvey, Col Jones | 1:21 |
| 10. | "Slave to the Casket" | | 3:18 |
| 11. | "Slaughtercult" | | 1:36 |
| 12. | "Funeral Fuck" | Harvey, Beams | 3:03 |
| 13. | "Vacant Grave" | | 2:35 |

== Personnel ==
=== Exhumed ===
- Matt Harvey – guitars, bass, vocals
- Col Jones – drums
- Mike Beams – guitars, vocals

=== Guest musicians ===
- Mieszko Talarczyk – lead guitar ("Fester Forever"), engineering, mixing, mastering
- Juan Urteaga – additional vocals
- Leon del Müerte – additional vocals
- Sean McGrath – additional vocals
- Henke Forss – additional vocals
- Jason Balsells – additional vocals

=== Production ===
- Jonathan Canady – design
- Julio Sánchez – photography
- Juan Urteaga – assistant engineering
- Matthew F. Jacobson – executive production
