= New England Metal and Hardcore Festival =

Annual festival held in Worcester, Massachusetts, United States

The New England Metal and Hardcore Festival is an annual festival held in Worcester, Massachusetts, United States. The weekend-long concert of heavy metal and hardcore punk bands along with a merchandising and promotional area for record labels and other vendors, has been held in the Worcester Palladium since its inception in 1999.

== Timeline ==
=== 1999 – NEMHF I ===
Morbid Angel, Napalm Death, Gwar, Deicide, Manowar, Earth Crisis, Isis, Overkill, Converge, Diecast, Vital Remains, Madball, Crossthread, Non Compos, God Stands Still

The headliners were Morbid Angel and Napalm Death on the 1st night, Gwar and Deicide on the 2nd night, and Manowar and Earth Crisis on the third night. It was originally supposed to be The Misfits instead of Manowar, which is why there was more hardcore on the third day, but The Misfits canceled their appearance, thereby placing Manowar as the replacement headliner.

=== 2000 – NEMHF II ===
Friday, February 11, 2000 – Machine Head, Six Feet Under, Reveille, Shadows Fall, Immolation, Skarhead, 7th Rail Crew, Hate Machine, Gangsta Bitch Barbie, Primer 55, Simple, Buried Alive, Rain Fell Within, 100 Demons, Unearth, Scrape, Sworn Enemy, 6 Thirty 7, Long Winter Stare, Havoc, Hateplow, Eastcide, Shed, R22, Colepitz, Nok, Hypnotic Kick, Dead Trees Sway, Morgan 2, Neck, Blindside, Trustfall

Saturday, February 12, 2000 – Misfits, Cannibal Corpse, Hate Eternal, Snapcase, Vision of Disorder, Candiria, Reach the Sky, Isis, Indecision, The Dillinger Escape Plan, Dying Fetus, Turmoil, Pessimist, Diecast, Grade, Dissolve, All That Remains, Drowningman, The Step Kings, Gargantua Soul, Internal Bleeding, maudlin of the Well, Torn Asunder, Chimaira, Deceased, The Hope Conspiracy, Blood Has Been Shed, Diabolic, Himsa, Skinless, Killswitch Engage, Aftershock, Suffer, Old Man Gloom, Cannae, Catheter, Excoriate, Dragbody, Death Threat, In My Eyes, Ground Zero, Recoil, Haste, Spite, Onslaught, Humans Being, God Dethroned, Toxic Field Mice, Delvic, Codeseven, Crash Davis, In Pieces, Hatebreed, Anal Cunt

=== 2001 – NEMHF III ===
Cannibal Corpse, wasteform, Dimmu Borgir, Nile, The Haunted, Lamb of God, Malevolent Creation, Catastrophic (ex-Obituary), Monstrosity, Meshuggah, Amorphis, Opeth, Shadows Fall, Dying Fetus, Gorguts, God Forbid, Zao, Living Sacrifice, All Out War, Diecast, Skinless, Noctuary, All That Remains, Poison the Well, God Below, Exhumed, Cannae, The Hope Conspiracy, Killswitch Engage, Nullset, Blood Has Been Shed, and Vital Remains, Suffocation, Held Under, Mushmouth, Santa Sangre, and Zircon.

=== 2002 – NEMHF IV ===
In Flames, Cannibal Corpse, Nile, Shai Hulud, Overcast (reunion), Soilwork, Throwdown, Poison the Well, Lamb of God, Dark Funeral, Killswitch Engage, God Forbid, Pissing Razors, Arch Enemy, Nora, All That Remains, deadeyesunder, Burnt by the Sun, Light Is the Language, Dasai, Severe Torture, Disavowed, Disgorge, Deeds of Flesh, Pig Destroyer, Deceased, Novembers Doom, Skycamefalling, From Autumn to Ashes, Devil May Care, Halo, Incantation, Mastodon, Blood Has Been Shed, Misery Index, Scar Culture, Kataklysm, Barium

=== 2003 – NEMHF V ===
Opeth, Shadows Fall, Nevermore, Lacuna Coil, Kataklysm, Goatwhore, Novembers Doom, Noctuary, Full Blown Chaos, Beyond The Sixth Seal, Wasteform, Eviscerate, Blood Has Been Shed, DRI, Cannae, Bongzilla, Crematorium, Locked In A Vacancy, Scarlet, Grimlock, The Acacia Strain, Superjoint Ritual, Meshuggah, The Haunted, Suffocation, Lamb Of God, Converge, Killswitch Engage, Strapping Young Lad, Unearth, Eighteen Visions, Diecast, Speedkillhate, NORA, Bleeding Through, Beyond The Embrace, Chimaira, Harakiri, Drowning, Held Under, Dysrhythmia, Traumaside, Pig Destroyer, The Red Chord, Atreyu, Misery Index, Cephalic Carnage, Most Precious Blood, Mastodon, Hate Eternal, Baby Brown Eye, Caliban, Himsa, Premonitions Of War, 100 Demons, The Takeover, Uphill Battle, On Broken Wings and a special performance by Agoraphobic Nosebleed

=== 2004 – NEMHF VI ===
Killswitch Engage, Arch Enemy, Machine Head, God Forbid, Iced Earth, Children of Bodom, Downward Deception, Zao, Throwdown, Bleeding Through, A Perfect Murder, All My Sins, All That Remains, As I Lay Dying, The Autumn Offering, Between The Buried And Me, The Black Dahlia Murder, The Bled, Burnt By The Sun, Bury Your Dead, Byzantine, Cannae, Cattle Decapitation, Comeback Kid, Crematorium, Darkest Hour, Daughters, Deadwater Drowning, Diecast, Ed Gein, Embrace Today, Evergreen Terrace, Evergrey, Every Time I Die, Found Dead Hanging, From A Second Story Window, Full Blown Chaos, Glass Casket, The Judas Cradle, Kataklysm, Martyr AD, Misery Index, Misery Signals, Mortal Treason, Most Precious Blood, NORA, Pig Destroyer, The Red Chord, Reflux, Scar Culture, Scarlet, Since The Flood, Six Feet Under, Soilent Green, Speedkillhate, Terror, Through The Discipline, To The Grave, Twelve Tribes, Walls of Jericho, Watch them Die, What Weapons Bring War

=== 2005 – NEMHF VII ===
Hatebreed, Gizmachi, Unearth, Obituary, Nightwish (cancelled), Chimaira, Cryptopsy, Hell Within, King Diamond, Nile, Soilwork, A Life Once Lost, All Shall Perish, All That Remains, As I Lay Dying, Behemoth, Black Dahlia Murder, Blood Has Been Shed, Bury Your Dead, Dark Tranquillity, Darkest Hour, Evergreen Terrace, Full Blown Chaos, Glass Casket, Hypocrisy, If Hope Dies, Internal Bleeding, Ion Dissonance, It Dies Today, Kylesa, Maroon, Misery Signals, Nimic, Premonitions Of War, Pro-Pain, The Red Chord, Reflux, Remembering Never, Scurvy, Sonata Arctica, Stemm, Strapping Young Lad, The Acacia Strain, The Agony Scene, The Esoteric, The Killing, The Minor Times, Throwdown, Trivium, Winter Solstice, Mnemic, Cephalic Carnage, Origin, Between the Buried and Me, Noctuary, Paria

=== 2006 – NEMHF VIII ===
A Love Ends Suicide, Bronx Casket Company, Burn in Silence, Byzantine, Cannae, DragonForce, Lacuna Coil, Gamma Ray, Hypersolid, Inked in Blood, Into Eternity, Kid Deposit Triumph, Light This City, Mercury Switch, Protest the Hero, Sanctity, Withered, Orphan Secks, Wolf, xDeathStarx, 3, Bloodlined Calligraphy, Born Victim, Cellador, Daughters, Doomriders, Folly, Goat Horn, Phoenix Mourning, The Miles Between, Torn Asunder, xLooking Forwardx, Yakuza, 100 Demons, Arch Enemy, At All Cost, Baby Bottom Smashers, Caliban, Chimaira, Embrace The End, Exodus, God Forbid, Hate Eternal, Immolation, Into the Moat, Ion Dissonance, On Broken Wings, Overcast, Butte Skratcha, Scars of Tomorrow, Since The Flood, Skinless, Suffocation, Terror, Colin of Arabia, Damnation AD, Death Threat, First Blood, Full Blown Chaos, Righteous Jams, Shoot To Kill, Spitfire, Sworn Enemy, The Human Abstract, The Jonbenét, Turmoil, Alarum, Arsis, A Life Once Lost, Hateblood, Between the Buried and Me, Dead to Fall, Demiricous, Haste The Day, If Hope Dies, Necrophagist, Nodes of Ranvier, Scarlet, Still Remains, The Absence, The Acacia Strain, The Black Dahlia Murder, The Red Chord, Through the Eyes of the Dead, Neckdeath, Cephalic Carnage, Ed Gein, From A Second Story Window, Ligeia, Ringworm, Suicide Silence, Today I Wait

=== 2007 – NEMHF IX ===
April 27, 2007

Behemoth, Dimmu Borgir, DevilDriver, Walls of Jericho, Kataklysm, 3 Inches of Blood, Still Remains, Skinless, The Devil Wears Prada, Atomic Six, 100 Demons, NORA, Despised Icon, Nachtmystium, xDEATHSTARx, Animosity, DÅÅTH, December Aeternalis, Merauder, Suicide Silence, Death Before Dishonor, Ligeia, Pale Horse, Kylesa, Bloodlined Calligraphy, Stick to Your Guns, Thy Will Be Done, Skeletonwitch, As Blood Runs Black, Beneath The Massacre, The Faceless, The Funeral Pyre.

April 28, 2007

Unearth, Cannibal Corpse, The Black Dahlia Murder, The Red Chord, Job for a Cowboy, Lizzy Borden, God Dethroned, Impious, Goatwhore, 3, Shai Hulud, Since the Flood, Demiricous, Cellador, Hallows Eve, Beyond The Embrace, Architect, Animosity, Psyopus, If Hope Dies, Gaza, Absence, Forever In Terror, Apiary, Sons of Azreal, Catalystic Confession, The Destro, The Miles Between, The Network, Epicurean.

=== 2008 – NEMHF X ===
April 25, 2008
Megadeth, In Flames, Children of Bodom, Job for a Cowboy, High on Fire
April 26, 2008
Dimmu Borgir, Shadows Fall, Behemoth, Overkill (cancelled), The Acacia Strain, Hate Eternal, Kataklysm, Vital Remains, Heaven Shall Burn, As Blood Runs Black, Despised Icon, Animosity, Through The Eyes Of The Dead, Skeletonwitch, Monstrosity, Keep of Kalessin, The End, Ghost Inside, Municipal Waste, Disfear, First Blood, On Broken Wings, Sleeping Giant, Arsis, Soilent Green, From A Second Story Window (cancelled), Cold World (cancelled), Cockpunch, Trap Them, Veil of Maya, For the Fallen Dreams, Embrace The End
April 27, 2008
Ministry, Meshuggah, Divine Heresy (cancelled), Ensiferum, Turisas, Týr, Eluveitie, A Life Once Lost, Emmure, Vanna, Stick to Your Guns, Winds of Plague, Impending Doom, Born of Osiris, Unholy, Kid Deposit Triumph (cancelled before festival), Unexpect, After the Burial, The Classic Struggle, Shai Hulud, Full Blown Chaos, Punkmeat, Tony Danza Tap Dance Extravaganza, Hemlock, Thy Will Be Done, Ligeia, Since the Flood, Recon, xTyrantx, Stray from the Path, Waking the Cadaver, Sea of Treachery, With Dead Hands Rising, Arsonists Get All the Girls (added at last minute due to Kid Deposit Triumph dropoff)

=== 2009 – NEMHF XI ===
April 17, 2009

- Main Stage presented by Metal Blade Records:

All That Remains, Between the Buried and Me, The Haunted, The Acacia Strain, Suffocation, August Burns Red, Napalm Death, Whitechapel, Kataklysm, Toxic Holocaust, After The Burial, Psycroptic, Burning Human, Sylosis, Merauder, Woe of Tyrants

- 2nd Stage presented by Prosthetic Records:

Cattle Decapitation, Veil Of Maya, Psyopus, Coliseum, Aggressive Dogs, The Miles Between, Decrepit Birth, Trap Them, xThe Warx, Architect, Withered, Bison B.C., Left To Vanish

- Developing Artists Stage presented by Deathcote Records:

Within The Ruins, Rose Funeral, The Destro, Brother Von Doom, We Were Gentlemen, Conqueror, Surrounded By Teeth, Pictures Of Winter, Half Hearted Comeback, Shroud of Bereavement, When The Deadbolt Breaks, Underlying Truth, Mordisk

April 18, 2009

- Main Stage presented by Metal Blade Records:

Lamb of God, As I Lay Dying, Children Of Bodom, God Forbid, Municipal Waste, Emmure, Winds Of Plague, All Shall Perish, Austrian Death Machine, iwrestledabearonce, Thy Will Be Done, The Ghost Inside, Book Of Black Earth, ABACABB, Landmine Marathon, The Crimson Armada, Suicide Silence(secret special guest), Acaro

- 2nd Stage presented by Prosthetic Records:

Have Heart, Terror, Shipwreck, Cold World, Trapped Under Ice, Cruel Hand, The Carrier, This Is Hell, Energy, Unholy, Grandpa Fist, Defeater, Dead Swans, Century (American band)

- Developing Artists Stage presented by Deathcote Records:

Stray from the Path, Soldiers, Oceano, Catalepsy, The Gary Coleman Project, Conducting From The Grave, Half Hearted Comeback, Broadcast The Nightmare, Autumn Black, For Today, Black Teeth, This or the Apocalypse

=== 2010 – NEMHF XII ===
Friday, April 23 and Saturday, April 24.

April 23, 2010
Mastodon, Between the Buried and Me, Baroness, Cro Mags, Earth Crisis, Death Threat, Death Before Dishonor, Colin of Arabia, Doomriders, Thick As Blood, Black Pyramid, Nachtmystium (cancelled), Donnybrook, XTheWarX, Grave Maker, Valient Thorr, After The Burial, The Fall Of Troy, Mongoloids, Burning Empires, Monsters, Howl.

April 24, 2010
Cannibal Corpse, Amon Amarth, Job For A Cowboy, Whitechapel, Skeletonwitch, Eluveitie, The Red Chord, Municipal Waste, Impending Doom, Lecherous Nocturne, Tony Danza Tap Dance Extravaganza, Chelsea Grin, Abacabb, Arsonists Get All The Girls, Malefice, Swashbuckle, Cattle Decapitation, Acaro, Holy Grail, Disembodied, Cruel Hand, Reign Supreme, XTyrantX, Rose Funeral, Soul Control, Mother Of Mercy, Gaza, Across The Sun, Through The Eyes Of The Dead.

=== 2011 – NEMHF XIII ===
Thursday, April 14, Friday, April 15 and Saturday, April 16

April 14, 2011
Attack Attack, Memphis May Fire, Vanna, MyChildren MyBride, Our Last Night, Stray from the Path, Arsonists Get All the Girls, A Bullet For Pretty Boy, Lions Lions, Armor for the Broken, This or the Apocalypse, I, The Breather, Across the Sun, Too Late the Hero, Atilla, A Plea for Purging, Dr. Acula, The Crimson Armada, Legacy, Counterparts, Legion, An Early Ending, Capitals

April 15, 2011
Biohazard, Blood For Blood, Bury Your Dead, Terror, Winds of Plague, Stick to Your Guns, Your Demise, Thy Will Be Done, This is Hell, The Carrier, Suffokate, Born Low, Murder Death Kill, Trapped Under Ice, Lionheart, Shai Hulud, Close Your Eyes, Legend, Monsters, The World We Knew, The Great Commission, The Greenery, Hundredth, King Conquer, Betrayal, Withered, Venia, Death Ray Vision, She Has Fallen, Years Since the Storm

April 16, 2011

- Main Stage:

Hatebreed, Between the Buried and Me, Born of Osiris, Times of Grace , Darkest Hour (cancelled), Carnifex, Job For a Cowboy, Dying Fetus, Oceano, The Ocean, Cephalic Carnage, Tony Danza Tap Dance Extravaganza, Within the Ruins, The Contortionist, Volumes, Structures

- Second Stage:

Skeletonwitch, 3 Inches of Blood, Nails, A Life Once Lost, Believer, Revocation, Withered, Lazarus A.D., Last Chance to Reason, Son of Aurelius, Legion, Hung, Wretched

=== 2012 – NEMHF XIV ===
Thursday, April 19, Friday, April 20, Saturday, April 21, and Sunday, April 22

April 19, 2012
Thy Will Be Done, Last Chance To Reason, The Confrontation, Forsaken, Eyes of the Dead, Strike Hard, Acaro, Conforza, Desiccation, Widow Sunday, Hivemasher

April 20, 2012
The Black Dahlia Murder, The Acacia Strain, Oceano, All Shall Perish, Obey The Brave, Nile, Skeletonwitch, Lionheart, Carnifex, Fleshgod Apocalypse, First Blood, Molotov Solution, The Contortionist, Reign Supreme (band), Conducting From The Grave, Fit For An Autopsy, Incendiary, Palehorse, Hour of Penance, Legion, Relentless, Pathogenic.

April 21, 2012
All That Remains, DragonForce, Overkill, Unearth, Iwrestledabearonce, Protest the Hero, Periphery, Bane, God Forbid, Shipwreck, Cruel Hand The Mongoloids, Structures (cancelled), System Divide, Naysayer, The Greenery, Diamond Plate, Rotting Out, Expire, Trumpet The Harlot, Manners, Malefice (cancelled), Suidakra, Cockpunch, Fire In The Skies, Wrong Answer, Revenge.

April 22, 2012
Killswitch Engage, Every Time I Die, Vanna, Emmure, For Today, Chelsea Grin, Sleeping Giant, Stick To Your Guns, Attila, On Broken Wings, Mychildren Mybride, For the Fallen Dreams, Texas In July, Upon A Burning Body, Volumes, Like Moths To Flames, Glass Cloud, Hundredth, No Bragging Rights, Counterparts, Gideon.

=== 2013 – NEMHF XV ===
Friday, April 19, Saturday, April 20, and Sunday, April 21

April 19, 2013
Disgrace, Antagonist AD, Rude Awakening, Suburban Scum, Twitching Tongues, Code Orange Kids, Expire, Power Trip, The Mongoloids, Xibalba, Death Before Dishonor, Trap Them, Lightsbane, Scalpel, Mutilation Rights, Allegaeon, Vygr, Holy Grail, Black Breath, Shadows Fall, Municipal Waste, Exodus, Every Time I Die, Hatebreed, Anthrax

April 20, 2013
Saving Grace, Those Who Fear, Ark of The Covenant, Dead By Wednesday, Mouth Of The South, East Beast, City In The Sea, Years Since The Storm, Reflections, Battlecross, Goatwhore, Murder Death Kill, Born Low, Alpha & Omega, Terror, Totality, Hellsot, trollfest, heidevolk, Fit For An Autopsy, Glass Cloud, Tyr, The Contortionist, Within The Ruins, After The Burial, Born Of Osiris, Ensiferum, Katatonia, The Dillinger Escape Plan, Opeth

April 21, 2013
To The Wind, Agitator, Brick By Brick, The Greenery, Warhound, Turnstile, Thick As Blood, Sworn In, incendiary, Gideon, Bracewar, Remembering Never, Trapped Under Ice, Welcome The Tide, Skylar, Dark Sermon, Beyond The Shore, Walking The Dead, Fit For A King, Erra, Legion, I Declare War, The Plot In You, Texas In July, Job For A Cowboy, Miss May I, D.R.I., Sick of It All, Suicidal Tendencies

=== 2014 – NEMHF XVI ===
April 17, 2014

All That Remains, Bleeding Through, Broken Hope, Cop Problem, Darkest hour, Emmure, Enabler, Fallujah, Gideon, InDirections, Julius Seizure, Kublai Khan, Oceano, Rivers of Nihil, Scars of Tomorrow, The Last Ten Seconds of Life, Years Since The Storm

April 18, 2014

1349, Behemoth, Bent Life, Black Crown Initiate, Born Low, Carnifex, Colin Of Arabia, Cruel Hand, Erra, Fire and Ice, Fit For An Autopsy, Goatwhore, I Declare War, Inquisition, Malfunction, Naysayer, Obey The Brave, Reflections, Slapshot, Suburban Scum, The Acacia Strain, The Mongoloids, Thy Art Is Murder, Warhound, Whitechapel, Within The Ruins

April 19, 2014

Menace, Terrible Minds, Sands, Madball, King Nine, Will to Die, Wisdom in Chains, Presence of Fear, Axis, Ante Up, Rude Awakening, Barricade, Dementor, City of Snakes, Heavyweight, Steel Nation, Step Up, Hatebreed, Up Your Arsenal, Greylines, Paper Trail, Incited, Lifeless, Empire of Rats, Comeback Kid, H2O, Blood For Blood, Death Before Dishonor, Remembering Never, Vice, 100 Demons, Floods, Bad Terms, The Storm, Strength For A Reason, Agitator, Not Til Death, Futile Justic

=== 2015 – NEMHF XVII ===
April 17, 2015

Between The Buried And Me, The Red Chord, Cavalara Conspiracy, Death Angle, Terror, Within The Ruins, Corrosion of Conformity, Bane, On Broken Wings, Wisdom In Chains, Code Orange, Overcast, H2O, Biohazard, Jasta, CDC, Agitator, Rock Bottom, Surge of Fury, Black Mask, Homewrecker, Eternal Sleep, Downpresser, Phineus

April 18, 2015

Testament, E. Town Concrete, Exodus, Strengthen What Remains, Nuclear Assault, Nails, Indecision, Incendiary, Suburban Scum, Incantation, Vital Remains, Allegaeon, Rivers of Nihil, World War 4, Wisdom in Chains, Disgrace, Gods Hate, Thy Will Be Done, Vice, No Zodiac, Extinction AD, Absolute Suffering, Nailbomb, Incite

April 19, 2015

Kid Dynamite, Strength For A Reason, The Color Morale, Vanna, Death Before Dishonor, Cruel Hand, Lionheart, The Plot in You, I Declare War, These Streets, My Ticket Home, Nasty, Rude Awakening, Lorna Shore, Gift Giver, The Last Ten Seconds of Life, Brick by Brick, World of Pain, Shark Ethic, Unity, Ghost Ship, Living Laser, Oath, Exalt, For Today, Motionless In White

=== 2016 – NEMHF XVIII ===
April 15, 2016

- Bury Your Dead
- Carnivora
- Disentomb
- Epicenter
- Fallujah
- Great American Ghost
- Left Behind
- Madball
- Merauder
- Oceano
- On Broken Wings
- Pathogenic
- River Black
- The Black Dahlia Murder
- The Days Ahead
- Traitors
- Varials
- Without Warning

April 16, 2016

- 36 Crazyfists
- Currents
- Earth Crisis
- Exalt
- Ghost Key
- Hollow Earth
- Hope Before The Fall
- In Depths & Tides
- Inari
- Of Nations
- Jesus Piece
- Killswitch Engage
- Memphis May Fire
- Old Wounds
- Reflections
- Ringworm
- Toothgrinder
- Unearth
- Unlocking the Truth
- Wind Walkers
- Zao

=== 2023 – NEMHF ===
This year's edition marked the return of the festival after a five year hiatus.

September 15, 2023

- Parkway Drive
- The Amity Affliction
- Northlane
- Make Them Suffer

September 16, 2023

- Lamb of God
- Hatebreed
- Shadows Fall
- The Black Dahlia Murder
- Dying Fetus
- Fit for an Autopsy
- Despised Icon
- Chelsea Grin
- Terror
- 100 Demons (cancelled)
- E.Town Concrete (replaced 100 Demons)
- Vein.fm
- 200 Stab Wounds
- Crown Magnetar
- Darkest Hour
- Enterprise Earth
- Frozen Soul
- Fuming Mouth
- Gates to Hell
- Hazing Over
- Jesus Piece
- Judiciary
- Momentum
- Paleface
- Ringworm
- Tribal Gaze
- Undeath

=== 2024 – NEMHF ===
September 21, 2024

- Killswitch Engage
- Converge
- Machine Head
- Nails
- Overkill
- After the Burial
- Better Lovers
- Full of Hell
- Incendiary
- The Red Chord
- Emmure
- Bleeding Through
- Overcast
- Xibalba
- Integrity
- Year of the Knife
- 200 Stab Wounds
- Alluvial
- Balmora
- End
- Glacial Tomb
- Mammoth Grinder
- Missing Link
- No Cure
- On Broken Wings
- Psycho-Frame
- Since the Flood
- Simulakra
- Tribal Gaze

September 22, 2024

- Slaughter to Prevail
- Suicidal Tendencies
- As I Lay Dying
- Bane
- Suicide Silence
- Terror
- Shadow of Intent
- Throwdown
- Brand of Sacrifice
- Fleshgod Apocalypse
- Pain of Truth
- Brat
- Corpse Pile
- Death Before Dishonor
- Disembodied Tyrant
- Ends of Sanity
- Escuela Grind
- Ingested
- Foreign Hands
- Jarhead Fertilizer
- Life Cycles
- Mouth for War
- PeelingFlesh
- Snuffed on Sight
- Trail of Lies
- Two Piece
- Upon Stone
- With Honor
- The Zenith Passage

=== 2025 – NEMHF ===
One Day Only This Year

Saturday September 20, 2025 Outside (Two Main Stages)

- Lorna Shore
- Cannibal Corpse
- Kublai Khan Tx
- Bury Your Dead (Final Farewell Set)
- Drain
- The Black Dahlia Murder
- Municipal Waste
- Despised Icon
- Shadow of Intent
- Sanguisugabogg
- Full of Hell
- Peeling Flesh
- Gideon
- Varials
- Gates to Hell
- Fulci

Inside Side Stage (Palladium Upstairs)

- Madball
- All Out War
- Big Ass Truck IE
- Guilt Trip
- Hard Target
- Vomit Forth
- Chamber
- Teeth
- Bay Way

== DVD release ==
- New England Metal Hardcore Festival 2003
  - Trustkill Records
  - EAN: 0824953005192
