= Saints & Sinners Festival =

- Genre: Hardcore punk, heavy metal
- Dates: October/November
- Locations: Asbury Park, New Jersey
- Years active: 2006 – present
- Founders: TSL Productions
- Website: saintsandsinnersfest.com

Saints & Sinners Festival is a two-day hardcore and heavy metal music festival held yearly in New Jersey. It started in 2006 at the Asbury Park Convention Hall on October 28 and October 29. The first day had emo/screamo/post hardcore bands and Atreyu headlined. The second day had metal/hardcore bands and Killswitch Engage headlined. The festival came back in 2007 and was held on November 3 and 4. Against Me! headlined on the 3rd and Glassjaw headlined on the 4th. The festival spun off into a tour in 2009, featuring Senses Fail, Hollywood Undead, Haste the Day, and Brokencyde.

== 2006 ==
At Rest

- A Life Once Lost
- All That Remains
- Atreyu
- Bleeding Through
- Cellador
- Chiodos
- Despised Icon
- Drop Dead, Gorgeous
- Ed Gein
- Escape the Fate
- Every Time I Die
- Folly
- From a Second Story Window
- Full Blown Chaos
- God Forbid
- Heavy Heavy Low Low
- Helvetika (local)
- Job for a Cowboy
- Killswitch Engage
- Left to Vanish
- Ligeia
- Mindless Self Indulgence
- NORA
- Remembering Never
- Sacred Hatred
- See You Next Tuesday
- Suicide City
- The Devil Wears Prada
- The Kisscut
- The Number Twelve Looks Like You
- The Warriors
- This Is Hell
- Through The Grey (local)
- Through the Eyes of the Dead
- Unearth
- Zero Strikes Back (local)

== 2007 ==
Saints and Sinners took place on November 3 and 4. The Crusade held competitions for local bands to compete to play at Saints and Sinners. The competition started in July. Prices were $30 for a one-day pass and $57 for a two-day pass. Against Me! headlined the 3rd and Glassjaw headlined the 4th.

=== November 3 ===
- Against Me!
- Agnostic Front
- August Burns Red
- Bang Camaro
- Bela Kiss
- Drop Dead, Gorgeous
- Elysia
- Four Letter Lie
- Future Cult Classic (local)
- Hip Hop Karaoke
- Horse the Band
- Kaddisfly
- LoveHateHero
- Municipal Waste
- Newlywed Disaster
- Saves the Day
- Strike Anywhere
- The Casualties
- The Number Twelve Looks Like You
- Whitechapel

=== November 4 ===
- Glassjaw
- A Skylit Drive
- The Agony Scene
- Alexisonfire
- All Shall Perish
- Animosity
- The Banner
- Between the Buried and Me
- Blessthefall
- Dance Gavin Dance
- December Aeternalis
- Envy on the Coast
- From a Second Story Window
- From Autumn to Ashes
- From First to Last
- Ground To Machine (Local)
- Misery Signals
- MyChildren MyBride
- Norma Jean
- Saosin
- Shai Hulud
- Silverstein
- Suicide Silence
- Black Moon (local)
- The Man with Dynamite Hands
