= Nowhere Bound (album) =

Studio album by Death Before Dishonor
- Released: May 16, 2025
- Studio: Rock Valley / Planet Z Massachusetts
- Genre: Hardcore punk
- Length: 22:47
- Label: Bridge 9
- Producer: Zeuss

Death Before Dishonor chronology
Unfinished Business (2019)	Nowhere Bound (2025)

Singles from Nowhere Bound
- 1. "Overruled" Released: February 28, 2025; 2. "Pushed to the Edge" Released: April 18, 2025

Nowhere Bound is the sixth studio album by Boston hardcore punk band Death Before Dishonor. It was released on May 16, 2025, via Bridge 9 Records. It is the first album to feature guitarist Justin Viera and the first since Better Ways to Die to feature guitarist Ben "B-Roll" Kelly.

== Overview ==
Nowhere Bound was produced by Zeuss who had worked on the band on their previous album Unfinished Business. The album was recorded between Rock Valley Studio in Easthampton and Planet-Z studios in Wilbraham, Massachusetts.

According to drummer Ben Hilton lyrical themes touch upon the bands mental state throughout the past six years "There are familiar themes from past records, like loyalty & friendship, but we also take on entirely new topics for us, like describing what it’s like to maintain your principles as you get older." He also described the songs as unspoken thoughts finally getting put to paper. Lead singer Bryan Harris noted that the band took more time on the album making sure they were satisfied with the songs.

The albums title comes from a song with the same name off of their 2002 debut album True Till Death.

On February 28, 2025, the first single "Overruled" was released alongside an official music video. The second and final single "Pushed to the Edge" was released on April, 18. A music video for "Inherit The Pain" was released alongside the album of May, 16.

== Critical reception ==
Professional ratings
Review scores
Source	Rating
Away From Life	Positive
Distorted Sound Magazine	7/10
Ox-Fanzine	4.5/5 stars

Ox-Fanzine stated "it’s already a record every hardcore fan should own." Adding "Despite the stylistic resemblance mentioned earlier, the quintet stays true to itself and delivers the goods across the entire album. It’s testosterone-fueled, metallic old-school hardcore with all the trimmings. Frontman Bryan Harris, in particular, sounds more pissed off than ever, delivering a sound that hits like a punch in the face." Disorted Sound added "Nowhere Bound is pretty much as good a place to start as any other with DEATH BEFORE DISHONOR, especially with its chunky muscular mix courtesy of returning producer Zeuss. It’s exactly what people come to this band for – neither more nor less – and if it is your first exposure to them and you like what you hear then the good news is there’s five more where that came from."

== Track list ==
All tracks are written by Death Before Dishonor.

No.	Title	Length
1.	"Intro"	1:41
2.	"Inherit The Pain"	2:00
3.	"Die Alone"	1:58
4.	"Pushed To The Edge"	2:06
5.	"Will To Fight"	2:19
6.	"Overruled"	2:40
7.	"Forgive And Forget"	1:18
8.	"Thick As Thieves"	2:09
9.	"Life’s Grip"	1:39
10.	"End Of Days"	2:25
11.	"Nowhere Bound"	2:43
Total length:		22:47

== Personnel ==
Death Before Dishonor

- Bryan Harris – vocals
- Ben Hilton – drums
- Greg Chihoski – bass
- Ben "B-Roll" Kelly – guitars
- Justin Viera – guitars

Technical

- Zeuss — producer
