= First Blood (band) =

American hardcore band

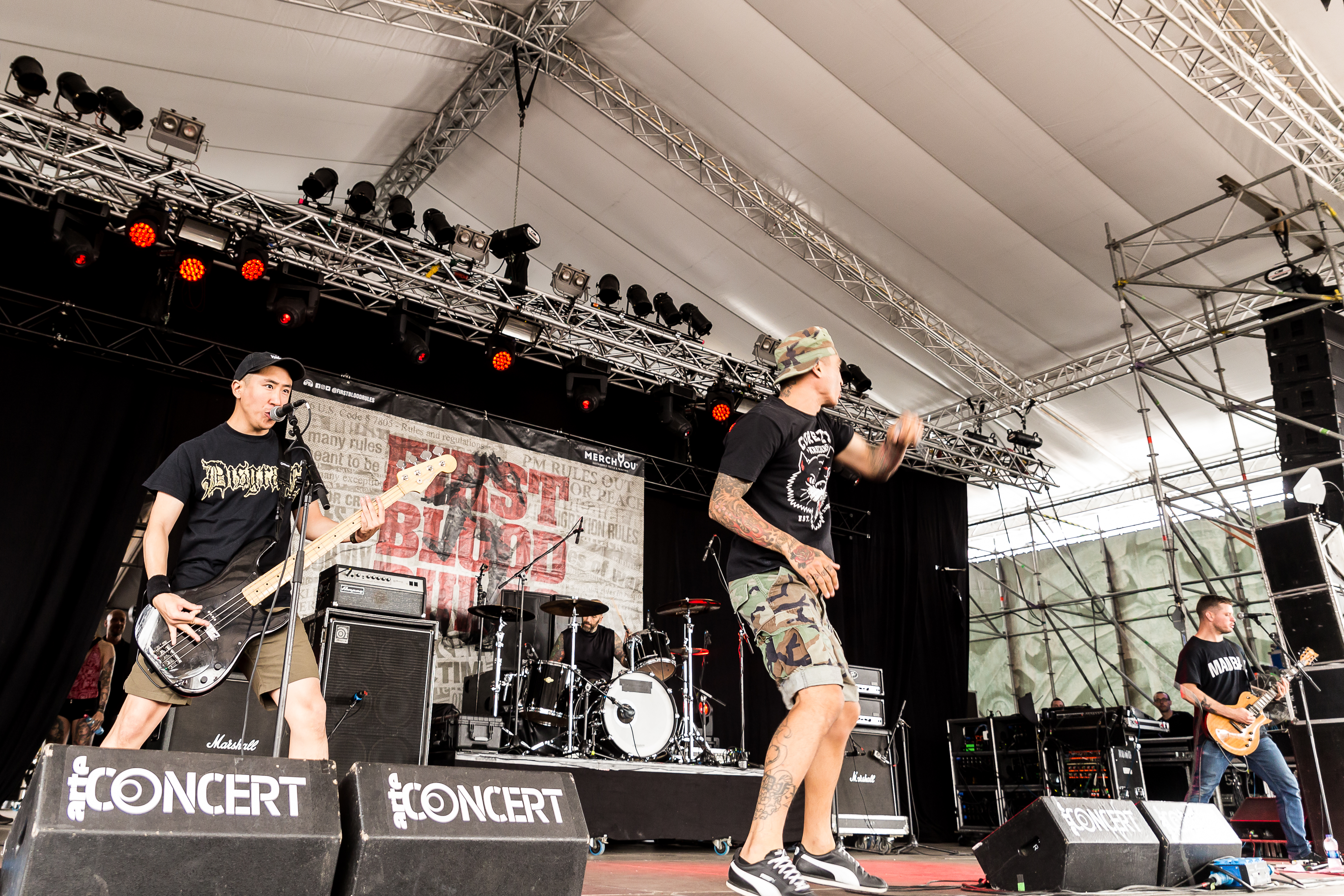
- First Blood at With Full Force 2018

Background information
- Origin: San Francisco, California, U.S.
- Genres: Beatdown hardcore, metalcore, tough guy hardcore
- Years active: 2002–present
- Labels: Pure Noise; Bullet Tooth; Truskill; Deathwish; Bridge 9
- Website: firstbloodrules.com

First Blood is an American hardcore band from San Francisco, California, formed in 2002.

== Background ==
First Blood released their debut record, an eponymously titled EP, in 2003. Then, the following year, they released a split EP with Blacklisted titled The Dead Man's Hand. Finally, in 2006, the band released their debut full-length album, Killafornia, on Trustkill Records. First Blood also went on tour that year with Ignite, Comeback Kid, The Red Chord, Sick of It All, Stretch Arm Strong, and others, and appeared at the New England Metal Fest on April 29. The band then toured extensively in 2007 with the likes of Full Blown Chaos, Since the Flood and Death Before Dishonor.

In 2010 they released their second album, Silence Is Betrayal, on Bullet Tooth Records.

On February 10, 2017, First Blood released its third studio album Rules, the first in seven years, produced by Will Putney on Pure Noise Records. The lyric video of "Rules of Conviction" was premiered in January of that year, and the video of "Rules of Conviction" featuring Jesse Barnett of Stick to Your Guns and Kobayashi Hiroyuki of Loyal to the Grave in June.

== Lineup ==
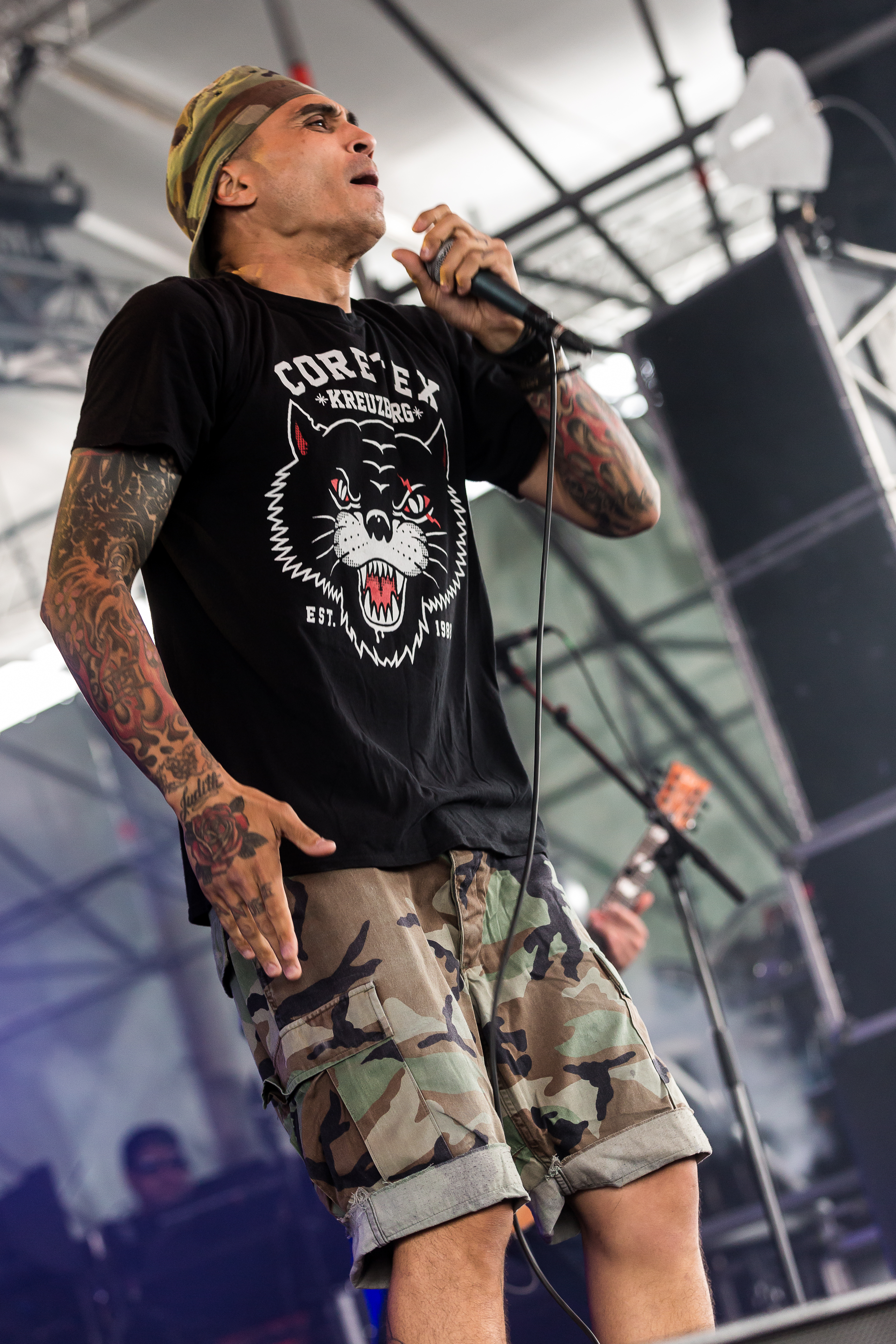
Carl Schwartz

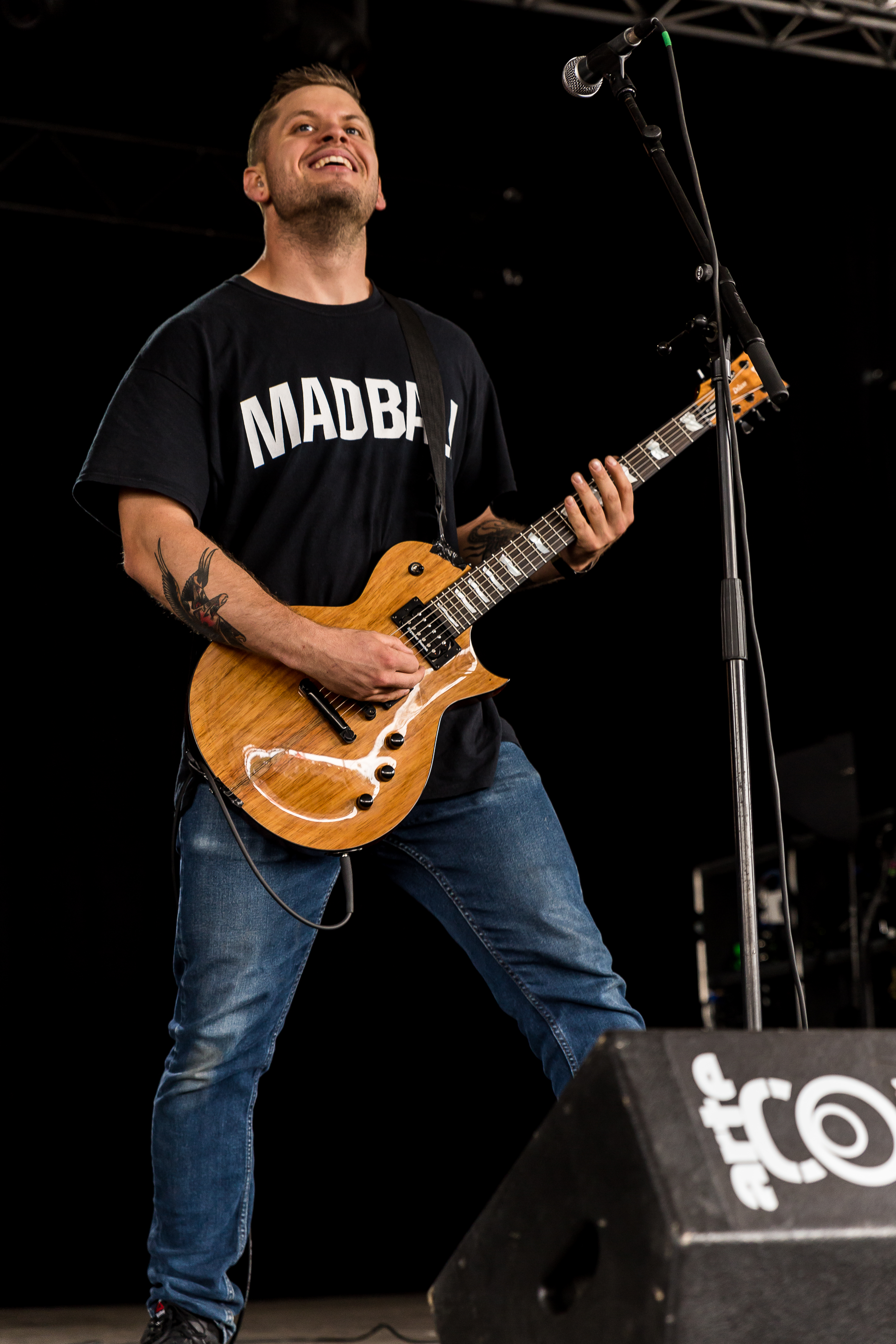
Johan Vesters

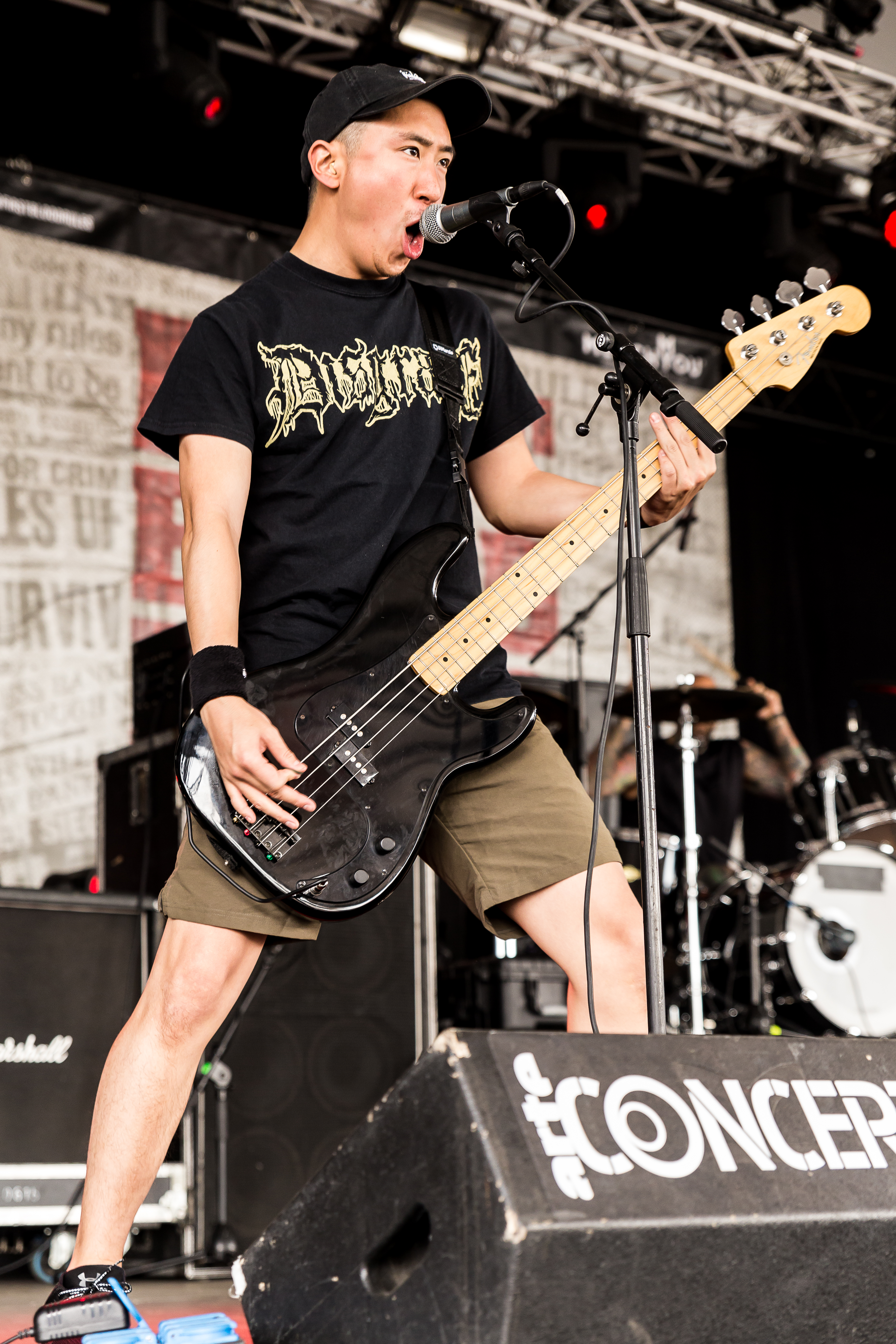
Daiske Shibamori

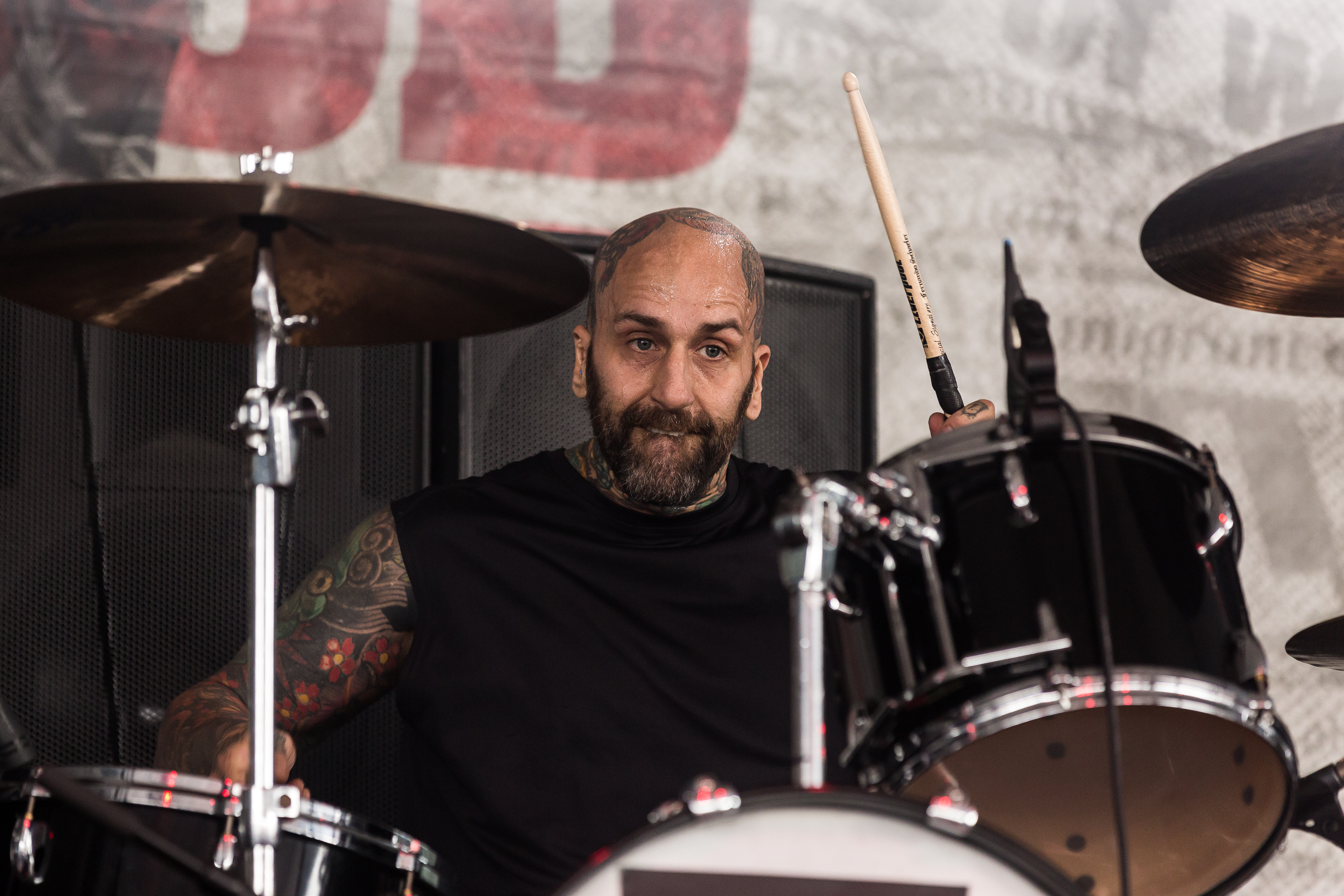
Fernando Schaefer

- Carl Schwartz – vocals (2002–present)
- Robert Rozendaal – bass (2019–present)
- Johan Vesters – guitar (2014–2019, 2022-present)
- Bobby Blood – drums (2003-2016, 2022-present)

Former

- Eddie Virgil – drums (Alcatraz)
- Anthony Pizzarelli – bass (Alcatraz)
- Manuel Peralez – guitar
- Kyle Dixon – guitar
- Doug Weber – guitar
- Brandon Thomas – drums (recorded drums on "Killafornia".)
- Michael Orris – drums (first touring drummer in support of the release of "Killafornia" - toured on and off.)
- Ryan Brooks – drums (filled in on tour when the band was seeking a full-time drummer)
- Daniel Fletcher – guitar
- Dave Stauble – guitar (2009)
- Joe Ellis – bass (ex- For The Fallen Dreams)
- Marc Strömberg – bass (filled-in on tour 2012)
- Jakob Arevärn – guitar (filled-in on tour 2013)
- Sebastian Sahin – bass (filled-in on tour 2013)
- Rhett Hornberger – drums
- AJ Borish – drums, bass (filled in on tour 2012, 2013)
- John Torn – bass (2013–2015)
- AJ Worrell – drums (filled in on drums and guitar in prior years) (2016–2017)
- Lordninnaum – guitar (2012–2019)
- Daiske Shibamori – bass (2017–2019)
- Joel Heijda – drums (2017–2019)
- Joe Kenney – guitar (2019–2022)
- Tiago – drums (2019–2022)

== Discography ==
- First Blood EP – 2003, Bridge 9 Records
- Dead Man's Hand 03 – 2005, Deathwish Inc. (split record with Blacklisted)
- Killafornia – May 2, 2006, Trustkill Records
- Silence Is Betrayal – November 9, 2010, Bullet Tooth Records
- Rules – February 10, 2017, Pure Noise Records (peaked at No. 18 on the Billboard Top Heatseekers chart)
