= Single Bullet Theory (metal band) =

American metal band

- Origin: Philadelphia, Pennsylvania, U.S.
- Genres: Heavy metal, thrash metal, melodic death metal, groove metal, metalcore
- Years active: 2000–2008, 2011–2019, 2023–present
- Labels: Crash Music, Inc. (2000–2008); Goomba Music (2011–2013)
- Members: Matt DiFabio; Justin Shaffer; Dan Loughry; Joey Eck
- Website: www.facebook.com/singlebullettheory

Single Bullet Theory (SBT) is an American heavy metal band from Philadelphia, Pennsylvania. The band was founded in 2000 by guitarist Matt DiFabio after the disbanding of Cipher (reactivated in Dec. 2015, renamed "Vedic" in Aug. 2017, and disbanded in July 2023). The band is led by vocalist/guitarist Matt DiFabio (ex-Pissing Razors). The band has released two EP's, five studio albums, and one compilation album. The band released its fifth studio album Divine Ways of Chaos on October 19, 2018.

== History ==
=== Early years and debut album Route 666 (2000–2003) ===
Drawing inspiration from the refined vehemence of black metal to the classy flair of power metal, the Philadelphia-based (then quintet) Single Bullet Theory formed in 2000. They displayed a strong do-it-yourself attitude and work ethic from the start, touring across the entire United States four times and issuing self-released EPs in 2001 and 2002, the second of which was produced by Eddy Garcia of Pissing Razors.

The band's talents were noticed and they were landed the opening slot for the entire month-long Hypocrisy, Soilwork, Killswitch Engage U.S. tour in the spring of 2002. Single Bullet Theory was finally able to ink a deal with Crash Music Inc. (formerly Pavement Records) in 2003. It was at this time that the band went from a 5-piece to a 4-piece, with guitarist Matt DiFabio taking over as lead vocalist while also remaining one of the band's guitarists and main songwriter. The band entered the studio to record their debut album, Route 666 (mixed by James Murphy of Testament, Death and Obituary fame), which was released in April of that year. Route 666 has been described as "an unforgiving example of sensory assault." The band filmed their debut music video for the song "Murder Machines" (filmed and produced by Brett Worley), which aired on MTV2's Headbanger's Ball and Fuse TV's Uranium later that year. SBT toured extensively in support of Route 666 including a monthlong run with the metal band King Diamond and Entombed in the fall of 2003.

=== Behind Eyes of Hatred (2004–2005) ===
Their second release, Behind Eyes of Hatred (2004) featured guest performances by Matt Thompson (King Diamond) and James Murphy (guitarist) (Death, Testament, Obituary). In support of Behind Eyes of Hatred, the band ventured across the US and Canada with Amorphis, Into Eternity and Beyond the Embrace in March 2005 and also released its second music video for the song "Hollowed Out" (filmed and produced by Jay Bones).

=== On Broken Wings (2006–2008) ===
After a series of lineup changes, a brief period of record label negotiations, and spending nearly two years writing material for what would become their third album; On Broken Wings was finally completed in 2007. SBT was able to reestablish its relationship with Crash Music Inc. and released On Broken Wings in the fall of 2007. Mixed by longtime friend Eddy Garcia (ex-Ministry, Pissing Razors), On Broken Wings "showcases the bands ability to capture raw, explosive riffing mixed with subtly placed clean passages and incredibly dynamic vocals. The hooks are strong and the aggressiveness is even stronger." The band continued pounding the local and regional club circuit, playing shows throughout 2007 and 2008. However, in the spring of 2008 due to various internal and external struggles, founding member Matt DiFabio decided to call it quits and put SBT to rest. DiFabio and bassist Bill Mez continued pursuing other projects together, but towards the end of that year, Mez quit the music business to focus on his personal life.

=== IV (2011–2013) ===
After a three-year hiatus, Matt DiFabio decided to piece Single Bullet Theory back together. During the downtime, DiFabio had written songs for what would become the band's fourth full-length album, aptly titled IV, which was released in 2011 on the newly emerged Goomba Music. IV proved to be a great uplifter for the band, and after a seven-year hiatus from national touring SBT went on to support a three-week tour with Canadian extreme progressive metal band Into Eternity in the summer of 2012. The band also shot and released a music video in late 2011 for the song "Diabolical" (filmed and produced by Jay Bones). In 2012 SBT continued to perform live before hitting the studio to record the song "Edge of Broken", which would become one of five previously unreleased songs on their upcoming self-titled compilation album. The band filmed their fourth video for "Edge of Broken" in 2012 (filmed and produced by Matt DiFabio).

A highlight track from IV is "The Auctioneer", a ten-minute instrumental featuring 18 guest guitar solos from 14 well-known metal guitarists, including Tim Roth (Into Eternity), Jeff Loomis (Nevermore), Pete Blakk (King Diamond, Disasterpeace), John Perez (Solitude Aeturnus), Mark Simpson (Flotsam and Jetsam), Jack Frost (Seven Witches, Savatage), Rob Doherty (Into Eternity), Riggs (Rob Zombie, Scum of the Earth), Curran Murphy (Annihilator, Nevermore), James Murphy (guitarist) (Testament, Death), Metal Mike Chlasciak (Sebastian Bach, Halford), Attila Voras (Nevermore, Leander), Carlos Alvarez (Shadowdance), and John Ruszin III (Carfax Abbey).

Single Bullet Theory released their own brand of hot sauces in 2013; "Damnation", a habanero/garlic sauce, and "Route 666" which is ghost pepper based.

=== Self-titled compilation (2014–2015) ===
In 2014 amidst the writing and recording process for SBT's next full-length album, founder Matt DiFabio spent time compiling a variety of tracks for a self-titled compilation album. The album features previously unreleased, remixed, and/or remastered songs, and ends with a previously recorded but never released cover of the song "Spirit Crusher" by the legendary death metal band Death. The album also features a link to the band's hidden website page which contains a thirty-seven minute video with track by track commentary by DiFabio and (then ex-) bassist Bill Mez reminiscing on the band's fourteen-year history. SBT supported its release by touring for three weeks in the fall of 2014 through the Midwest and Texas.

=== Divine Ways of Chaos (2015–2020) ===
SBT began writing for their newest album Divine Ways of Chaos in 2013, working under a non-pressured, steady pace and recording the album throughout 2014 at DiFabio's studio Hard Attack Audio. 2016 marked the return of longtime bassist Bill Mez. The band continued performing local and regional shows through 2018, and released their latest album Divine Ways of Chaos on October 19, 2018, after a lengthy and tumultuous period which saw lineup changes and serious health conditions delay its release. The band had begun to write new material in 2017 for a future release, tentatively titled "Dark Fields", but progress was put on hold indefinitely. Unfortunately drummer Rob Gladden died in March 2022 at the age of 33 after a four year long battle with osteosarcoma.

=== Darkfields (2023–present) ===
As of September 2023, DiFabio has assembled a new line up of Single Bullet Theory which again features Richard Gulczynski (guitar), long-time friend Justin Shaffer (bass), and Joey Eck (drums) whom DiFabio has been performing with in various musical projects since 1991. SBT has 11 new songs written and are planning to begin recording during the winter of 2025. The band has performed several shows locally and regionally under this new line up and will be scheduling more dates throughout Pennsylvania, Maryland, Ohio, New York and the new England area throughout the spring, summer and fall of 2025. In July 2025 the band announced the return of Dan Loughry on guitar, replacing Rich Gulczynski who left the band due to personal and creative differences.

== Discography ==
=== Studio albums ===
- The Anatomy of Being, EP (2001)
- Single Bullet Theory, EP (2002)
- Route 666 (2003)
- Behind Eyes of Hatred (2004)
- On Broken Wings (2007)
- IV (2011)
- Single Bullet Theory, compilation (2014)
- Divine Ways of Chaos (2018)
- DarkFields (production begins 2025)

== Members ==
=== Current lineup ===
- Matt DiFabio – Guitars (2000–2019, 2023 to present), Vocals (2003–2019, 2023 to present)
- Dan Loughry – Guitars (2005–2008, 2025 to present)
- Justin Shaffer – Bass (2023 to present)
- Joey Eck – Drums (2023 to present)

=== Former members ===
- Bill Mez – Bass (2000–2008, 2016–2019)
- Steve Kilp – Bass (2000)
- Johnny Sasso – Drums (2000–2003, 2007–2008)
- Doug Rush – Guitars (2000–2004)
- Mark Shveima – Vocals (2000–2002)
- Dave Brown – Vocals (2002)
- Jason Dunkerley (studio only) – Drums (2004, 2007)
- Matt Thompson (studio only) – Drums (2004)
- Jay Horvath – Drums (2004–2005)
- Carlos Alvarez (live only) – Guitars (2004–2005)
- Darren Patrick – Drums (2005–2006)
- Acacio Carvalho – Drums (2011)
- John Ruszin III – Guitars (2011)
- Nick Bunczk – Drums (2011–2013)
- Jeff Kalber – Bass (2011–2014)
- Joe Brannigan – Guitars (2012)
- Pat Brose – Guitars (2012–2013)
- Jeff Willet – Drums (2013)
- Justin Arman (studio only) – Drums (2013)
- Harry Lannon – Guitars (2013–2015)
- Rob Gladden – Drums (2013–2019; died 2022)
- Rich Gulczynski – Guitars (2016–2019, 2023–2025); Bass (2014–2015)
