= Bad News (Ligeia album) =

Studio album by Ligeia
- Released: August 5, 2008
- Recorded: December 2007 – January 2008
- Genre: Metalcore
- Length: 29:00
- Label: Ferret Records

Ligeia chronology
Your Ghost Is a Gift (2006)	Bad News (2008)

Professional ratings
Review scores
Source	Rating
Allmusic	3/5 stars
Rock Hard	7/10
Metal.de	7/10
Ox-Fanzine	7/10
Scream Magazine	3/6

Bad News is the second album by Massachusetts' metalcore band Ligeia.

== Track listing ==
No.	Title	Length
1.	"Bad News"	3:42
2.	"Johnny Cash"	3:11
3.	"I've Been Drinking"	2:30
4.	"Hot Mess"	2:20
5.	"One Night Stand"	2:37
6.	"Teenage Wasteland"	2:05
7.	"Interlude"	1:15
8.	"Bombshell"	3:17
9.	"Heroin Diaries"	2:52
10.	"Thanks for Nothing"	2:43
11.	"Hoodrat"	2:28
12.	"You Suck At Life (Japanese Bonus Track)"	2:55
Total length:		31:59
