= Lion of Judas =

Studio album by Elysia
- Released: June 10, 2008
- Genre: Metalcore
- Length: 26:46
- Label: Ferret Records
- Producer: Kurt Ballou

Elysia chronology
Masochist (2006)	Lion of Judas (2008)

Professional ratings
Review scores
Source	Rating
Allmusic	3/5 stars

Lion of Judas is the second album by deathcore band Elysia. The album has a large change in style compared to the band's previous album, drawing heavy influence from Converge, Botch, and Cave In. It was released on June 10, 2008 on Ferret Records. The album was leaked to P2P file sharing networks in early May 2008.

== Track listing ==
All tracks by Elysia & Zak Vargas

1. "Lack of Culture" - 2:47
2. "Flood of Kings" - 2:01
3. "Box of Need(les)" - 3:38
4. "Crown of Thorns" - 4:11
5. "Plague of Insects" - 3:26
6. "Pride of Lions" - 2:03
7. "Curse of God (part 1)" - 2:21
8. "Fountain of Life (part 2)" - 2:42
9. "Lion of Judas" - 4:57

== Personnel ==
- John Malanowski - bass, vocals
- Steven Sessler - drums
- Chris Cain - guitar
- Garrett Gilardi - guitar
- Zak Vargas - vocals
