= Your Ghost Is a Gift =

Studio album by Ligeia
- Released: March 21, 2006
- Recorded: December 2004 – April 2005
- Genres: Melodic hardcore, metalcore, melodic metalcore
- Length: 43:00
- Label: Ferret Records
- Producer: Ken Susi

Ligeia chronology
Demo 2004 (2004)	Your Ghost Is a Gift (2006)	Bad News (2008)

Professional ratings
Review scores
Source	Rating
Punknews.org	3/5 stars
Scream Magazine	3/6

Your Ghost Is a Gift is American metalcore band Ligeia's first full-length album released on March 21, 2006.

== Track listing ==
1. "Beyond a Doubt" - 2:28
2. "I'm Sorry You're Ugly" - 2:42
3. "Heart Attack" - 4:08
4. "Judas Complex" - 3:40
5. "The Blackout" - 5:37
6. "Household Stereotypes" - 3:54
7. "Makin' Love to a Murderer" (feat. Philip Labonte of All That Remains)- 3:08
8. "Swollen Eye View" - 3:45
9. "Always, Forever" - 4:18
10. "Dead Man's Bride" - 3:58
11. "Wishing Wells" - 5:22

== Credits ==
- Matthew Bennett - bass
- Phil Fonseca - drums
- Chris Keane - guitar
- Ryan Ober - guitar
- Keith Holuk - vocals
