= Blessed Be This Nightmare =

Studio album by Eternal Lord
- Released: March 17, 2008
- Recorded: Studio 6, Swindon, UK
- Genre: Deathcore
- Length: 38:09
- Label: Golf
- Producer: Ed Butcher; Stuart Mackay

Eternal Lord chronology
Eternal Lord (2007)	Blessed Be This Nightmare (2008)

Blessed Be This Nightmare is Eternal Lord's first and only full-length album. It was released on 17 March 2008 in the United Kingdom through Golf Records and the following day in the United States on Ferret Records. The Ottawa Citizen listed it as one of the "Top 10 Metal CDs of 2008".

== Reception ==
Joe Pelone of Punknews.org gave it a rating of one out of five stars. He was not impressed with the album, saying: "the laughably titled Blessed Be This Nightmare, cycles through the metal/hardcore playbook quickly and efficiently. But as a listening experience, it's a total death march, melodramatic yet ultimately tame". He closed out his review, opining; "this music does not move me in any possible way, whether musically, lyrically, or even ironically".

Shawn Jam Hill from The Ottawa Citizen gave it a rating of the out of five stars, and included it on the "Top 10 Metal CDs of 2008". He said the band was "unafraid to mesh seriously down-tuned chudstorming with a corpse-related vocal attack courtesy of Edward Butcher, funerary director of said proceedings". He highlighted the track "Wasps", as being a "chameleonic number that boasts a metal onslaught buoyed by charging gang vocals", and also praised the songs "The Damned Floor" and "Set Your Anchor".

In his review for Ox-Fanzine, Carsten Hanke writes; "despite my preference for modern, sometimes complex Death Metal by young people with sometimes chic hairstyles, I don't really warm to this band from England". He argues that the "attempt to mash everything up on one record goes completely wrong", pointing out that Edward Butcher's vocals come across as "lame and grunty". He opines further that as soon as the album "gets a little more fast-paced, it may seem scary to small children, but in my opinion it destroys almost every song", and that it "rumbles, bangs, screams and crashes, but without being any fun".

Dave Synyard of Exclaim!, admired the album saying it was "impressively heavy and sludgy as hell". He goes on to say that "lead vocalist Edward makes good use of his diversity via screams, belly growls and a subtlety higher growl. It allows the album to keep a cohesive sound while offering a variety that keeps things so fresh and so mean". HeavyMetal.dk rated it five out of ten stars. They said the vocals are "consistently deep and evil death metal growl", but "when you've heard half a track on this album, you know what you're in for, for the next three quarters of an hour, which also results in a somewhat boring experience".

== Track listing ==
All tracks are written by Ed Butcher & Chris Gregory.

No.	Title	Length
1.	"Hot To Trot"	1:01
2.	"Get To Fuck"	3:36
3.	"Set Your Anchor"	3:51
4.	"Wasps"	3:12
5.	"All Time High"	4:16
6.	"I, The Deceiver"	4:39
7.	"The Damned"	3:41
8.	"Amity"	3:04
9.	"O'Brothel Where Art Thou"	3:34
10.	"Ten Forty Five"	3:06
11.	"Blessed Be This Nightmare"	4:06
Total length:		38:09

== Personnel ==
- Ed Butcher – vocals
- Chris Gregory – guitar
- Shaun Zerebecki – guitar
- Nick Gardner – bass
- Stuart Mackay – drums, mixing and production
- Sons of Nero – artwork
