= Elysia (band) =

American deathcore band

- Origin: Shingle Springs, California, U.S.
- Genres: Deathcore, metalcore
- Years active: 2003–2008, 2013–2015, 2025–present
- Label: Ferret
- Past members: Zak Vargas; Chris Cain; Garrett Gilardi; Stephen Sessler; Jon Malinowski; Alex Porte; Kevin Marquez; Andre Vocino; Justin Chambers; Joey Rommel; Jeremy Chavez; Chris Thiele; Elymikk; John Sontag; Danny Lomeli; Mark Underwood; Jessy Singh

Elysia is an American deathcore band from Shingle Springs, California. Originally called Elysium's Revenge, the band was started in 2003 while the members were in high school. Since 2003 they have released one EP and two full-length albums and have completed two US tours despite frequent line-up changes. Having settled into a more consistent line-up, the band released Lion of Judas on June 10, 2008, through Ferret Records. The band disbanded in 2008, but announced their reformation in 2013. In May of 2024, the band remastered and reissued Masochist with bonus tracks and an insight into the album by vocalist Zak Vargas.

Elysia has toured and performed with bands including; Arsonists Get All the Girls, Knights of the Abyss, Catherine, Emmure, Heavy Heavy Low Low, Impending Doom, Suicide Silence and This Is Hell. The group also performed at the Saints & Sinners Festival in 2007.

== History ==
=== Formation and early years ===
Elysia started as Elysium's Revenge, while the band members were still in high school. The band gained notoriety in the Shingle Springs-Cameron Park area with their empty shows at the Shingle Springs Community Center. By the end of 2003, they shortened their name to Elysia and added a second vocalist, Justin Chambers, who helped them record their first EP. Months later, they penned "Incinerate," a song that became a staple in their setlist. In the spring of 2004 they recorded a second EP with the first occurrence of "Incinerate." The release show for this EP features Suffokate and The Frontline. That summer and fall, they would write "Triumph" and "Filthy."

=== Masochist ===
Out of the Masochist writing sessions came their first full album, Masochist. Originally planned for release on This City Is Burning Records, problems arose and it became a DIY effort. It was during this process that the band started to become more known, touring with killwhitneydead. Around this time, most of the band graduated, and Kevin Marquez left the band to move to San Diego. After several band member changes, they toured along the west coast. In the spring of 2007, the band planned to rerecord the album for a re-release on Tribunal Records, with Jamie King as the producer. However, drummer Joey Rommel left the band right before they went into Castle Ultimate Studios to record. Because of this recording disruption, Elysia never re-released the album, although they are on a Tribunal Records sampler. They found drummer Jacob Durrett (now playing drums in Fate) to fill in for a 10-Day tour with Impending Doom and Moria. After returning home they found Steven Sessler to play drums, who is still a member of the band. Alex Porte left the band in the summer of 2007, less than a month before their first full US tour. With Zak Vargas as the sole original member, the band almost broke up, but continued due to contractual responsibility to perform. They toured with Knights of the Abyss and Arsonists Get All the Girls, and during the tour got jumped for a second time. In the low point of the band, when they were about to break up, Elysia got signed to Ferret Records. Elysia signed into a three-day mini-tour, and the day it started Mark Underwood, Alex's replacement, leaves the band. Once again, the fate of the band was at stake, but Zak agreed to continue, and they found a replacement guitarist. To save the band, after the mini-tour Zak talked Garrett Gilardi, a high-school friend, into joining the band again, as well as Jon joining the band again as the bassist.

=== Lion of Judas ===
In December 2007, the band sat down to write their second album, Lion of Judas released through Ferret Records. They consider their new music to be "a new era for Elysia, so please do not expect the same band." They were on a tour with This Is Hell, where it concluded with a trip to Salem, Massachusetts where the new album was recorded with Kurt Ballou for a week. They dropped off the tour with Shai Hulud and Full Blown Chaos because of medical issues with Zak.

=== Disbanding and re-forming ===
After the drop-out of the last tour, there were hints of Elysia's then current state including their MySpace design removed and Zak's blog entries which included Elysia breaking up. Members including Zak, Steven, and Garrett looked into working together on a new project, but nothing surfaced.

Through many sources, it was confirmed the band had reformed. Plans fell through with the other members, thus putting to rest of any plans of reformation. Zak Vargas would later form black metal outfit VRTRA. Elysia, in 2025, would reform to play shows across California.

On July 30, 2026, drummer and former guitarist Danny Lomeli died.

== Musical style, influences and lyrical themes ==
Elysia's lyrics cover a wide range of topics, such as anti-homophobia, anti-establishment, and failed romantic love. The band admits that they sometimes had a hard time accurately portraying the meanings they wanted to put across, mainly because of "immaturity". For example, the lyrical content of "Incinerate" and "Filthy" has led to criticism of the band. They have also been banned from playing at venues because of their lyrics’ graphic violent content. Their sound has encompassed several facets of hardcore and metal. Their early material, to include Masochist, was of the death core style. Their second and final album, Lion of Judas, was of a style reminiscent of 90s hardcore in its sound; however, it continued the band's socially minded lyrical themes, albeit in a more seasoned manner.

The band's first studio album Masochist pulls heavily on metalcore and death metal influence (the two genres that make up deathcore). Although with breakdowns inspired directly from 90's hardcore rather than the typical metal core breakdown. Some of the band's influences include Entombed, Immolation, Dying Fetus, The Acacia Strain, Converge and Pantera.

== Band members ==
Current members

- Zak Vargas – vocals (2003–2008, 2013–2015, 2025–present)
- Alex Porte – guitars (2003–2007, 2013–2015, 2025–present)
- Steven Sessler – drums (2007–2008, 2026-present)
- Chris Lemos – bass guitar, backing vocals (2013–2015, 2025–present)

Former members

- Andre Vocino – guitars (2003–2006)
- Mark Underwood – guitars (2007, 2013–2015, 2025-2026)
- Kevin Marquez – drums (2003–2006)
- Pat Guild – bass (2003–2004)
- Justin Chambers – keyboard, vocals (2003–2004)
- Jeremy Chavez – bass (2004–2005)
- John Sontag – bass (2005–2006)
- Danny Lomeli – drums (2013–2015), guitars (2006–2007, 2025–2026) (died 2026)
- Jon Malanowski – bass, backing vocals (2006–2007, 2007–2008)
- Joey Rommel – drums (2006–2007)
- Chris Cain – guitar (2007–2008)
- Garrett Gilardi – guitar (2007–2008)

Timeline

== Discography ==
=== As Elysia ===
Studio albums

- Masochist (2006)
- Lion of Judas (2008)

EPs

- Killing Grounds EP (2004)

Demos

- 04 Demo (2004)
- Tease Her, Please Her, Stick Her in the Freezer (2005)

=== As Elysium's Revenge ===
EPs

- Demo (2003)
