= Left to Vanish =

American metalcore band

- Also known as: LTV
- Origin: Philadelphia, Pennsylvania
- Genres: Metalcore, deathcore
- Years active: 2001–2009, 2016–present
- Labels: Lifeforce
- Members: Sean Salm; Bob Meadows; Bryan Little; Paul Meredith
- Past members: Will Walker; John Walls; Andrew Karpinski; Steve Hanna; Ken Karpinski; Mark Zdon; Keith Nolan; Kevin Salm; Victor Figueroa

Left to Vanish is an American metalcore band formed in 2001 from Philadelphia, PA. With a number of member changes at their initial start, Sean Salm (age 15 in 2001) is considered to be the main contributor behind LTV's work. They released two albums in a 7-year span. Buried Alive in A Grave of Your Own Mistakes in 2005 on End All Music and Versus the Throne in July 2008 on Lifeforce Records. The band disbursed in 2009 right after setting plans to enter the studio to record their 3rd full-length album, due to conflicts between members.

LTV remained inactive until December 2016 w/ their first single in 7 years "The Recurrence Pattern" featuring Will Walker on vocals. They released their third album Dethroned which featured new frontman Bob Meadows (former member of A Life Once Lost) December 2017.

== Festival appearances ==
Infest 2006 Asbury Park, NJ w/ The Dillinger Escape Plan, Necrophagist, Job For A Cowboy, Cattle Decapitation, Animosity, Chiodos.
7 Angels 7 Plagues Reunion 2006 Fredericksburg, Va w/ Suicide Silence, All Shall Perish, Fear Before The March of Flames
Saints & Sinners Festival 2006 Asbury Park Convention Center w/ Atreyu, Everytime I Die, From First To Last, Bleeding Through.
Death By Decibels Fest 2006 Baltimore, MD w/ Napalm Death, A Life Once Lost, Skinless, Dead To Fall
CMJ Music Fest 2008 New York, NY
New England Metal and Hardcore Festival 2009 Palladium in Worcester, MA New England Metal and Hardcore Festival 2018 Palladium in Worcester, MA

== Members ==
- Sean Salm - guitar (2001-2009, 2015–present)
- Paul Meredith - drums (2004-2009, 2015, 2017–present)
- Bryan Little - bass (2006-2009, 2015–present)
- Randy Mac - guitar (2016–present)
- Bob Meadows - vocals (2017–present)

Former members

- Domenic Rocco - vocals (2001-2002)
- Ken Karpinski - bass (2001-2004)
- Andrew Karpinski - drums (2001-2004)
- Steve Hanna - guitar (2001-2006)
- Keith Nolan - vocals (2001-2009)
- Marc Zdon - vocals (2007-2008)
- Bill Walker - vocals (2007-2009, 2015-2017)
- Victor Figueroa - drums (2016-2017)
- Kevin Salm - guitar (2006-2009, 2015-2016)

== Discography ==
Date of Release	Title	Label
2005	Buried In a Grave of Your Own Mistakes	End All Music
2007	2007 EP	Self Released
2008	Versus The Throne	Lifeforce Records
2016	The Recurrence Pattern (Single)	Self Released
2017	Dethroned	Creep Records
2022	Neverender	Self Released
