= Friends Family Forever =

Studio album by Death Before Dishonor
- Released: 2005
- Genre: Hardcore punk
- Length: 18:43
- Label: Bridge 9

Death Before Dishonor chronology
True Till Death (2002)	Friends Family Forever (2005)	Count Me In (2007)

Professional ratings
Review scores
Source	Rating
PunkNews	1.5/5 stars

Friends Family Forever is the second studio album by Boston hardcore punk band Death Before Dishonor. It was released in 2005 on Bridge 9 Records.

== Track list ==
No.	Title	Length
1.	"Born From Misery"	1:48
2.	"Endless Suffering"	2:10
3.	"By My Side"	3:08
4.	"Never Again"	3:09
5.	"Walk Away"	2:44
6.	"Dying Inside"	2:30
7.	"6.6.6. (Friends Family Forever)"	3:14
