= Insect Song (album) =

Studio album by Beyond the Embrace
- Released: May 17, 2004
- Recorded: December 12, 2003 – February 9, 2004
- Studios: System Recordings, Ipswich, Massachusetts
- Genre: Melodic death metal
- Length: 43:17
- Label: Metal Blade Records
- Producer: Ken Susi

Beyond the Embrace chronology
Against the Elements (2002)	Insect Song (2004)

Insect Song is the second studio album by American heavy metal band Beyond the Embrace. It was released in 2004 on Metal Blade Records.

Mike Delano of Lollipop Magazine described it as "straight-up melodic death metal in the vein of obvious Swedish reference points, In Flames and Soilwork."

== Track listing ==
All tracks are written by Beyond the Embrace.

No.	Title	Length
1.	"Fleshengine Breakdown"	4:37
2.	"Plague"	4:07
3.	"My Fall"	5:05
4.	"Of Every Strain"	3:56
5.	"Redeemer"	5:12
6.	"Insect Song"	5:01
7.	"Ashes"	2:55
8.	"Weak and the Wounded"	3:47
9.	"Absent"	4:39
10.	"Within"	3:58

== Personnel ==
- Shawn Gallagher - vocals
- Alex Botelho - guitar
- Jeff Saude - guitar
- Oscar Gouveia - guitar
- Dan Jagoda - drums
- Chris Parlon - bass
