= Silence Is Betrayal =

Studio album by First Blood
- Released: 2010
- Genre: Hardcore punk
- Length: 44:06
- Label: Bullet Tooth

First Blood chronology
Killafornia (2006)	Silence Is Betrayal (2010)

Silence Is Betrayal is First Blood's second full-length release. It was released in 2010 by Bullet Tooth Records.

A review from The Music called it "a straight up hardcore album that will not satisfy old hardcore fans, but will be more than adequate for the younger generations that are not aware of the records that came before it".

== Track listing ==
No.	Title	Length
1.	"Intro"	1:09
2.	"Silence"	0:53
3.	"Preamble"	3:16
4.	"Enemy"	2:32
5.	"Resist"	1:24
6.	"Truth"	1:22
7.	"Detach"	4:51
8.	"Enslaved"	2:47
9.	"Confront"	2:37
10.	"Fear"	2:10
11.	"Occupation"	2:51
12.	"Fascism"	3:50
13.	"Lies"	3:54
14.	"Messenger"	1:12
15.	"Survive"	4:05
16.	"Armageddon II"	5:51
