= Bishop (band) =

Bishop A.C.
- Origin: Fort Lauderdale Florida, U.S.
- Years active: 2004-2017
- Labels: Ferret Records; Dead Truth Recordings
- Members: "Mean" Pete Kowalsky: Vocals; Sam Kooby: Guitar; Peter Vazquez: Drums; Shane Nerenberg: Bass
- Past members: Christopher Duett: Guitar; Aldo Rodriguez: Bass "Dual" Dave Chase: Bass; Daron Marino: Bass

Bishop A.C. (formerly xBISHOPx) was an American straight edge hardcore band, forming in 2004 and originating in Florida, United States. The band features current and former members of Until the End, Remembering Never, xReign of Terrorx, and Suffocate Faster. Its lyrical content includes perspectives on politics, society, and the straight edge.

Originally formed under the name xDiary Of A Corpsex, they recorded their first four track demo (which was later released as Bless the Dead in 2007). In 2005, the band changed its name and released their debut album Suicide Party on Ferret Records. Soon after, they released the remainder of recorded tracks on a split with The Red Baron. Despite rumors of a breakup or permanent hiatus, Ferret Records announced a second full-length album, Drugs, which was released on Dead Truth Records on November 11, 2008. The vinyl version of the album features an exclusive track.

The band released the Asylum 7" via Dead Truth Recordings in August 2009 before going on a hiatus from 2011-2013. They released their third album, Everything In Vein, in 2015 on Dead Truth Recordings.

== Discography ==
- Suicide Party (2006)
- "Bless the Dead" 7" (recorded in 2005 but released in 2007)
- Split with The Red Baron (2007)
- Drugs (November 11, 2008)
- Asylum (August 24, 2009)
- Everything In Vein (July 24, 2015)
