= Death Before Dishonor (band) =

American hardcore band

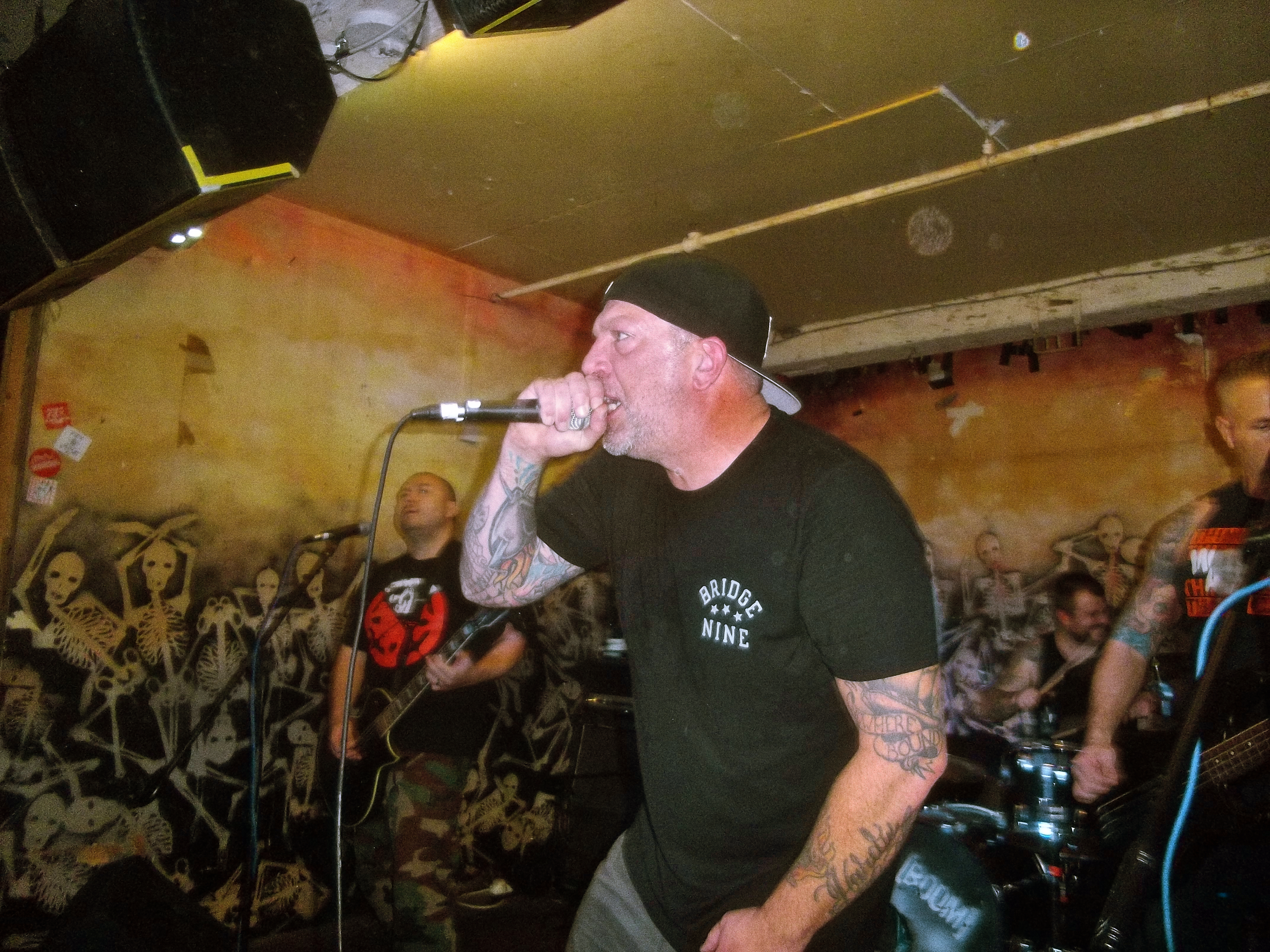
- Death Before Dishonor performing live in 2023

Background information
- Origin: Boston, Massachusetts, U.S.
- Genres: Hardcore punk; tough guy hardcore
- Years active: 2000–present
- Labels: Bridge 9 (2004–present); Spook City (2002–2004)

Death Before Dishonor (DBD or DB4D) is an American hardcore punk band from Boston, Massachusetts. Their initial releases were on Spook City Records; the group signed with Bridge Nine Records in 2005 and have released six albums.

== History ==
=== Formation and True Till Death (2000–2004) ===
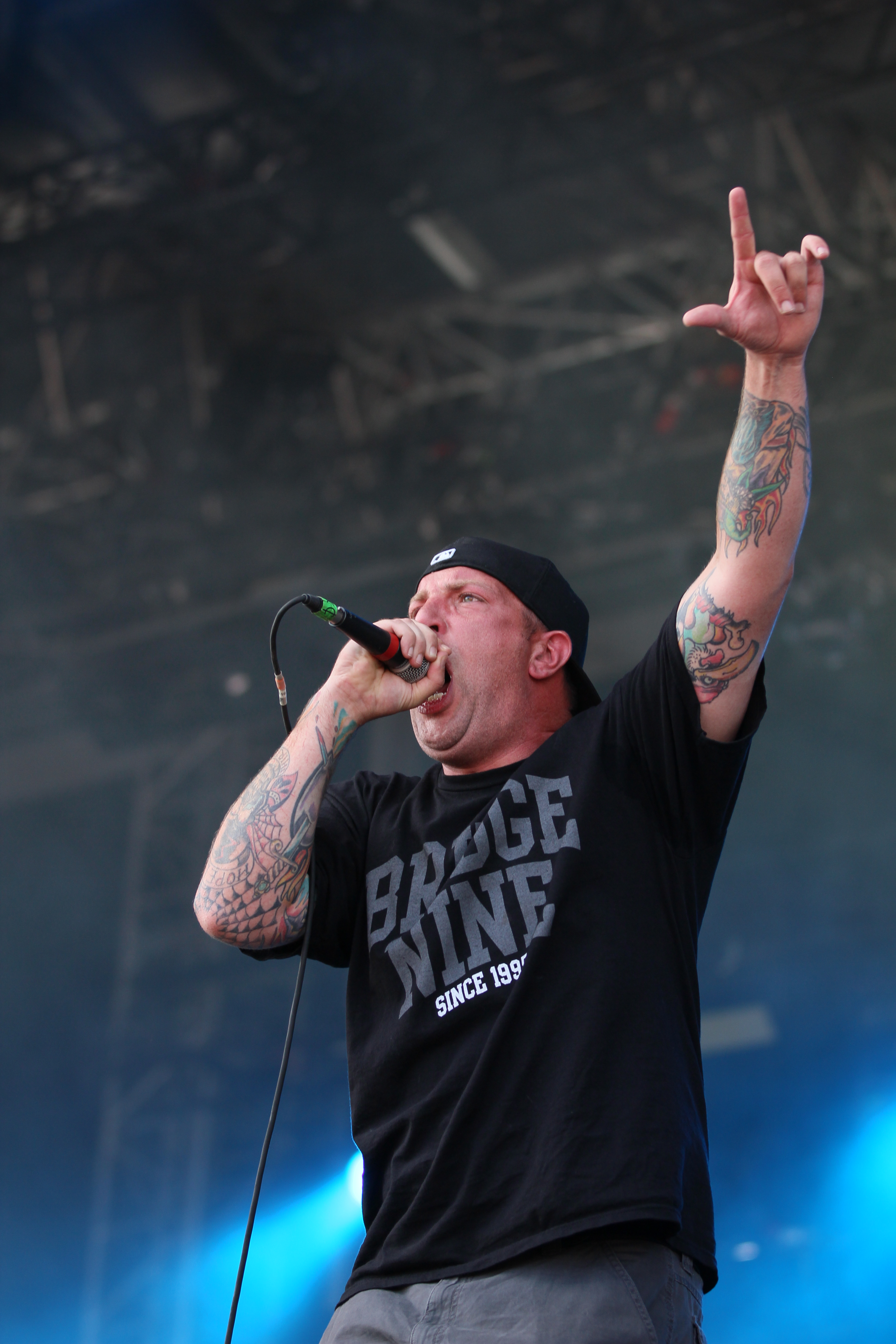
Lead singer Bryan Harris is the only remaining original member.

Death Before Dishonor was formed in Boston, Massachusetts in 2000. The original lineup was made up of members from defunct local bands such as Incision, Fuse, and League of Pain. The initial lineup consisted of vocalist Bryan Harris, guitarist Erik Deitz bassist Frankie Puopolo and drummer Dan Loftus.

In 2001, DBD self-released their four-song debut EP, Wartime. The following year, the band signed to the independent record label Spook City and released their debut album, True till Death. In 2003, DBD released a split ten-song record, Taking It Back, with the North Carolina hardcore band Nourish the Flame supplying the first six tracks and DBD contributing the last four. In 2004, the band re-released True Till Death with new cover art along with additional tracks from Taking It Back. In November 2004, DBD went on a short tour alongside Ringworm.

=== Friends Family Forever, Count Me in and Better Ways to Die (2005–2009) ===
In 2005 the band caught their first break when they signed with Bridge 9 Records and released their label debut Friends Family Forever. In May the band went on a U.S. tour in support of the album alongside Blacklisted. DBD kept up this newly-gained momentum by extensively touring throughout the rest of the year with hollow hardcore bands like Full Blown Chaos, Champion, Terror, and Agnostic Front. 2005 also saw the band's first lineup change, with guitarist Erik Deitz leaving, being replaced by Dave X. Ben "B-Roll" Kelly also joined the group as an additional guitarist. In 2006 the band continued touring heavily, including a summer U.S. tour with Terror. In total, the touring lasted for nearly two straight years.

In early 2007, DBD teamed up with well-known hardcore acts Sick of It All and Madball for a U.S. tour.

In May of that year, the band released their third studio album, Count Me In, which was produced by Jim Siegel. The album received positive reviews. The album sold 1,193 copies in its first week debuting at number 61 on the US Heatseekers chart. Cory of Lambgoat stated, "this album is definitely worth any hardcore fan's time. It's a well-written slab of beatdown hardcore with a bit more to it than most of its competition." The album's single "Break Through It All" also received significant play time on MTV Headbangers Ball.

By 2008, DBD were averaging 250 live performances a year, and embarked on an international tour in 2008, headlining in Australia, Europe, Mexico, and Canada. They also served as a supporting act for Sick of It All on a US tour, and Ignite on a European tour. 2008 also saw more lineup changes, with bass player Frankie Puopolo moving to guitar, with Rob Deangelis taking over Dan Loftus left that same year and was replaced by Memphis Murphy.

In 2009, Death Before Dishonor released their fourth studio album, Better Ways to Die, Greg Prato of AllMusic said, "with the arrival of Better Ways to Die, Death Before Dishonor have certainly blossomed into one of the top modern hardcore outfits of the modern day." This album marked DBD's first album release for the next 10 years. For the rest of the year, DBD continued touring regularly alongside bands like Death Threat, The Mongoloids, and xThe Warx and Terror.

=== Touring years (2010–2018) ===
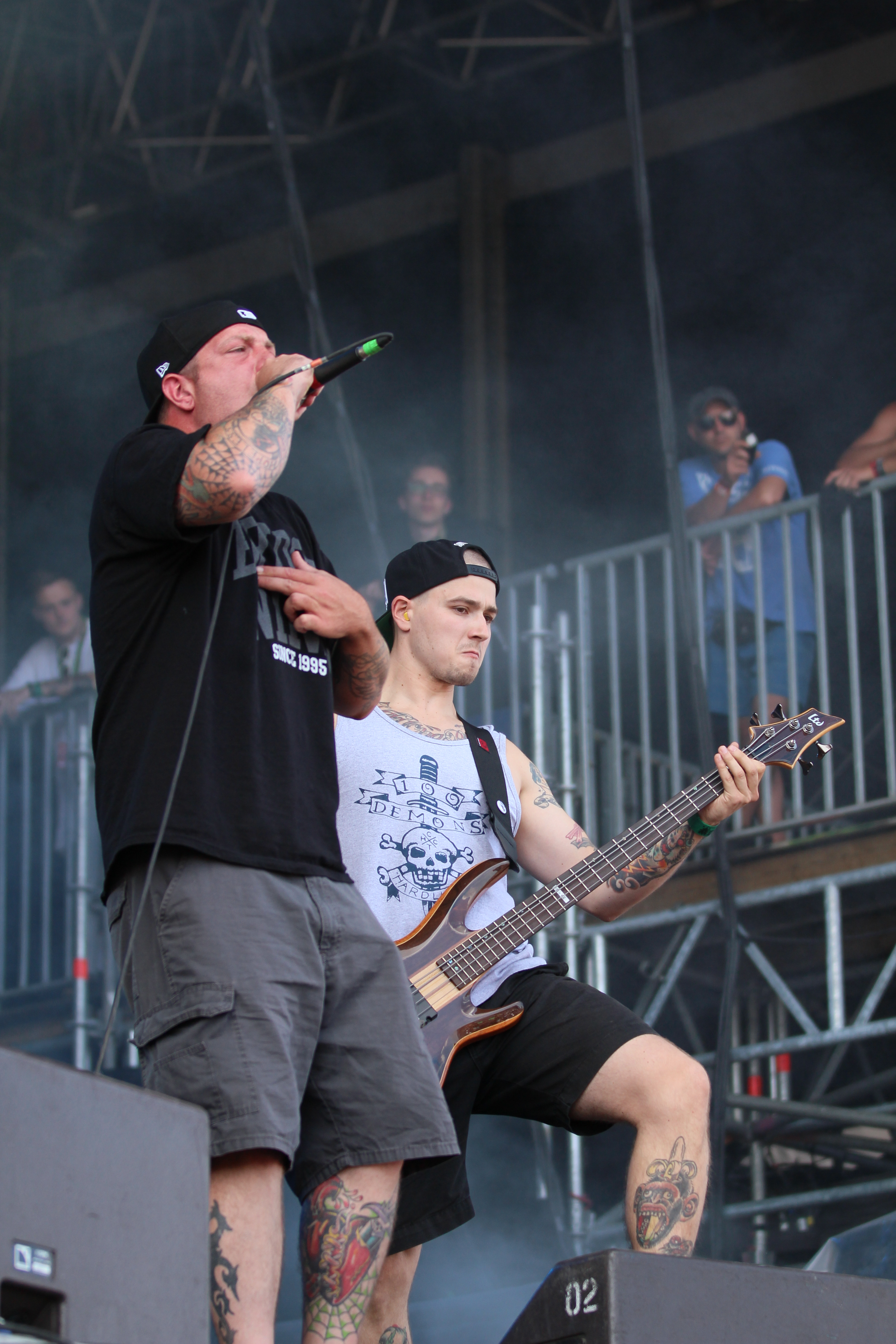
Death Before Dishonor at With Full Force 2014

In early 2010, the band toured alongside Evergreen Terrace and Death Threat.

This year again saw multiple lineup changes, as both Ben "B-Roll" Kelly and Rob Deangelis left the band. Colin Reilly joined the band as a new guitarist.

Throughout that fall, DBD supported acts such as Suicidal Tendencies, Cro-Mags and Strife at East Coast shows.

In early 2011, the group went on a U.S. tour with Casey Jones and a European tour with Mongoloids. In October 2011, DBD announced they were writing material for a new album, and would play some of the new songs on their early 2012 tour with Jones. However, this new material never came to fruition.

Around this time, drummer Josh Long left the band and was replaced by longtime member Ben Hilton.

In April 2012, the group went on a lengthy European tour with Terror and also took part in the Hell On Earth Tour alongside Walls of Jericho and others.

The group continued touring regularly throughout 2013. In 2014, a new bass player, Austin Sparkman, joined the band. To begin the year, DBD embarked on a North American headlining tour, with Betrayal and Seeker serving as support. Later that year, the band went on a co-headlining tour alongside Ringworm, and served as supporting act for Madball, alongside Turnstile, and Take Offense, along with multiple festival appearances.

In 2015, the band performed at that year's New England Metal Fest. They were also scheduled to tour the US with Cross Me in March, but the tour was canceled. Later that year, the band announced that they were preparing to record a new album. In 2016, DBD continued touring worldwide, including a short Mexico tour with Piece By Piece. In late 2017, the group embarked on a European headlining tour, with Last Hope serving as the sole supporting act.

=== Unfinished Business (2019–2024) ===
On May 20, 2019, DBD announced their first new album in ten years, Unfinished Business. The single "Cowards Will Fall" was released on June 15, with the album being released a month later in June. Hansel Lopez of Ghost Cult Magazine wrote, "Death Before Dishonor hasn't lost an inch of what got them to the dance." The group went on tour in support of the album. Bass player Austin Sparkman also left the band during the year and was replaced by Greg Chihoski.

DBD toured in early 2020 alongside Madball before taking the rest of the year off due to the COVID-19 pandemic, then returned to touring in 2021. 2021 also saw the departure of founding member Frankie Puopolo and longtime guitarist Colin Reilly. This resulted in the return of former guitarist Ben "B-Roll" Kelly.

In celebration of True Till Death's 20th anniversary, DBD re-released the record with new cover art. They also released a live recording of a 2006 performance at the CBGB, called live at the CBGB 07/13/06. In April 2022, Terror toured the US alongside Cruel Hand and Year of the Knife.

In February 2023, the band embarked on a European tour, followed by a separate United Kingdom tour with Slapshot, billed as the "Boston Takeover Tour". They later toured the United States in April alongside Hold My Own and Exit Strategy. That July, they released a two-song EP titled Master of None. Justin Viera also joined the band as a second guitarist.

In March 2024, DBD supported Dropkick Murphys at their yearly St Patrick's Day celebration shows. In April and May of that year, they went on a European tour, and made their first ever appearances in Georgia and Kazakhstan.

=== Nowhere Bound (2025–present) ===
After touring with Madball in early 2025, they also released a new single, "Overruled." DBD then announced on April 18, that a new studio album Nowhere Bound would be released on May 16. Another single, "Pushed to the Edge", was also released. Drummer Ben Hilton described the album as a "collection of statements and observations that represent our mindset through the past 6 years since our last record." The band then went on tour in support of the album. In November they embarked on a European tour with Terror, which also seen them play Friends Family Forever in its entirety for its 20th anniversary during a show at Revolution Calling.

To begin 2026, DBD toured the East Coast alongside Shattered Realm. The band is also scheduled to perform at multiple headlining shows and festivals across Europe during the summer.

== Artistry ==
Death Before Dishonor is a hardcore band that have become one of the more notable names in the Boston hardcore scene. AllMusic describes their style as a "back to basics" approach to American hardcore, fusing speed, metallic riffs, along with raspy yells and screams of vocalist Bryan Harris. Throughout DBD early years their sound was more heavier, raw and unpolished. However, from 2007s Count Me In and onwards the bands sound has become more polished with more of that metallic influence.

Throughout the band's tenure their lyrics have focused on loyalty, respect and not backing down. As lead singer Bryan Harris and the band have gotten older he has also mentioned that some of the lyrics focus on “maintaining your principles as you get older.”

Some of the band's main influences include Agnostic Front, Sick of It All, Merauder and Hatebreed. In a 2024 interview, lead singer Bryan Harris commented on the band's evolution and influences, stating:

Even our sound has kind of evolved. When we started the band we were a lot heavier. When we started we were in other local bands and we wanted to do more than just play in just our city or one state away, so back in 2001 Hatebreed was out, and there were just a lot of other heavy bands–we wanted to be a heavy band. We kind of matured over time and our influences changed too. If you asked me in 2000 what my influences were I’d be like: Merauder or Hatebreed, and they still are big influences but then we went on our first tour and played with Agnostic Front and I learned about more than just the band, they taught us how to tour. So that was another really big influence for us. As I said there are a bunch of legendary bands from Boston but a lot of them tend to break up, and at this point, I think the inspiration is still pushing hard for Boston, and what we feel hardcore is. I don’t have this is what hardcore is, it’s just ‘go out there, have fun, bring some energy.”

DBD are known for their active touring schedule and high energy performances. After over 20 years of being a band, the group have left little of the globe uncharted, playing shows and festivals all across North America, Canada, Central America, South America, Western Europe, Eastern Europe, Southeast Asia, Central Asia, and the Middle East.

== Members ==
Current

- Bryan Harris – vocals (2000–present)
- Ben Hilton – drums (2011–present)
- Greg Chihoski – bass (2019–present)
- Ben "B-Roll" Kelly – guitars (2005–2010, 2021–present)
- Justin Viera – guitars (2023–present)

Former

- Erik Deitz – guitars (2000–2005)
- Dave X – guitars (2005–2007)
- Colin Reilly – guitars (2010–2021)
- Rob Deangelis – bass (2008–2010)
- Austin Sparkman – bass (2014–2019)
- Dan Loftus – drums (2000–2008)
- Memphis Murphy – drums (2008–2010)
- Josh Long – drums (2010–2011)
- Frankie Puopolo – bass (2000–2008), guitars (2008–2021)

Timeline

== Discography ==
Albums

Title	Details
True Till Death	Released: March 15, 2002; Label: Spook City; Format: CD
Friends Family Forever	Released: February 22, 2005; Label: Bridge 9; Format: LP, CD
Count Me In	Released: May 22, 2007; Label: Bridge 9; Format: LP, CD
Better Ways to Die	Released: July 28, 2009; Label: Bridge 9; Format: LP, CD
Unfinished Business	Released: July 26, 2019; Label: Bridge 9; Format: LP, CD
Nowhere Bound	Released: May 16, 2025; Label: Bridge 9; Format: LP, CD

Singles & EPs

- Wartime (2001)
- Split with Black Friday '29 (2006) Bridge 9
- Break Through It All (2007) Bridge 9
- Our Glory Days (2009) Bridge 9
- Live At CBGB 07/13/06 (2022) Bridge 9
- Master Of None (2023) Bridge 9

Compilations

- True Till Death / Wartime Demo (20th Anniversary Re-Release) (2022) (Fast Break)

Compilation appearances

- Split with Nourish the Flame (2003) Spook City

Guest appearances

- Haywire — "Is What It Is Ain't What It Ain't" (2023) ft Bryan Harris

== Music videos ==
- Born from Misery (2006)
- Break Through It All (2007)
- True Defeat (2019)
- Freedom Dies (2019)
- Inherit The Pain (2025)

== Awards and nominations ==
Boston Music Awards

Year	Nominee / work	Award	Result
2023	Death Before Dishonor	Punk / Hardcore Artist of the Year	Nominated
