= Eyes of the Dead =

- Origin: New Haven, Connecticut
- Genres: Thrash metal Death metal
- Years active: 2004–present
- Label: Black Picket Fence Records
- Members: Frank Connors; Pat Seymour; Robert Moore; Brian Greene; James Stolfi
- Past members: Matt Talarczyk; Rich Wandell; Tim Price; Ryan Kiekel; William Fritz; Chris "Jr" Tallerdy; Robert Moore
- Website: Eyes of the Dead

Eyes of the Dead (EOTD) is an American heavy metal band from New Haven, Connecticut. They are signed to indie label Black Picket Fence Records. Formed in 2004, EOTD has recorded and released three albums, two EPs, and one single. They have toured throughout the northeastern and midwestern areas of The United States, opening for many different national touring acts, such as: The Absence, Agnostic Front, Anthrax, Carnivore, Dark Tranquility, Destruction, D.R.I., Dying Fetus, Emperor, Exodus, Goatwhore, God Forbid, Immolation, Job For A Cowboy, Krisiun, Last Chance To Reason Misfits, Misery Index, Motograter, Mushroomhead, Opeth, Revocation, Six Feet Under, Sodom, Sonata Arctica, Soulfly, Suffocation, Testament, Thy Will Be Done, Unearth, Warbringer, Winds of Plague, and many others.

Eyes of the Dead was founded by Matthew Talarczyk, Ryan Kiekel, Tim Price, Rich Wandell, all former members of the band Aggressia; and former singer of the band Deadwait, Frank Connors. They released their debut album What Nightmares Are Made Of in 2006. They began work on their follow-up album, The Weak and the Wounded, in 2007. Produced by Joey Zampella (Life of Agony), it was released on Black Picket Fence Records in 2009.

In July 2011, Eyes of the Dead toured the American midwest acting as support for the band Motograter on their Honoring of the Sun tour. That year, the band was also featured on the For the Headbangers – Brutal Music Volume Two Compilation CD, alongside bands including Jasta, Kingdom of Sorrow, Black Label Society, All That Remains, Crowbar, and Dead by Wednesday. The CD was handed out at the Hatewear tent at all U.S. and Canadian dates of the 2011 Rockstar Energy Mayhem Festival.

In 2012, EOTD announced the addition of drummer James Stolfi and guitarist Pat Seymour to the band.

On April 19, 2012, EOTD took part in the 14th annual New England Metal and Hardcore Festival, at The Palladium in Worcester, Massachusetts, featuring headliners Thy Will Be Done and Last Chance to Reason, and then again returned to the Palladium June 10 for the Worcester Deathfest, featuring Six Feet Under, Suffocation, Dying Fetus, Revocation, Fit for an Autopsy, and Vattnet Viskar.

Eyes of the Dead recorded the Dead Girls Never Say No EP in July 2012 at Studio B with producer Mike Z (100 Demons) for Ear One Productions. The EP was released 8/31/2012.

In earlyf 2014, Eyes of the Dead recorded their third album, The Sum of All Your Fears, at Dexters Lab Recording with sound engineer and producer Nick Bellmore. It was well received by local audiences, winning 2014 Album of the Year from Connecticut indie media outlets Metal Cyndicate and Metal Fortress Radio.

As of March 2016, the band is re-recording some previously released material at Dexters Lab. Founding guitarist Matt Talarczyk recently announced his departure from the band, but is included on these recordings. On July 20, 2016, Eyes of the Dead announced via Facebook the return of former guitarist, Robert "Hobbit" Moore, as well as a comeback show after a six-month hiatus.

== Members ==
Current members

- Frank Connors – vocals (2004–present)
- Pat Seymour – guitar (2012–present)
- Robert "Hobbit" Moore – guitar (2011–2012, 2016–present)
- Brian Greene – bass (2008–present)
- James Stolfi – drums (2012–present)

Former members

- Matthew Talarczyk – guitar (2004–02/2016)
- Rich Wandell – drums (2004–2007)
- Tim Price – bass (2004–2008)
- Ryan Kiekel – guitar (2004–2009)
- Bill Fritz – guitar (2009–2010)
- Chris "Jr" Tallerdy – drums (2007–2011)

Temp/Touring

- Rob "Mouse" Brown – Drums (2011), Guitar (2012)

Timeline

== Discography ==
Year	Title
2005	Demo
2006	What Nightmares are Made Of
2009	The Weak and the Wounded
2010	Let's Play Drink the Beer !! EP
2011	Evil EP
2012	Dead Girls Never Say No EP
2013	"Postmortem Glory" – Single
2014	The Sum of All Your Fears
