= Killafornia =

Studio album by First Blood
- Released: 2006
- Genre: Heavy hardcore
- Label: Trustkill

First Blood chronology
| The Dead Man's Hand 03 (2003) | Killafornia (2006) | Silence Is Betrayal (2010) |

Killafornia is First Blood's first full-length release. It was released in 2006 by Trustkill Records.

The album was rated a 7 out of 10 by Blabbermouth.net.

== Track listing ==
| No. | Title | Length |
|---|---|---|
| 1. | "Next Time I See You, You're Dead" | 1:03 |
| 2. | "First Blood" | 3:29 |
| 3. | "Conspiracy" | 4:13 |
| 4. | "Suffocate" | 3:31 |
| 5. | "Execution" | 4:43 |
| 6. | "Victim" | 2:57 |
| 7. | "Conflict" | 4:04 |
| 8. | "Tides" | 3:05 |
| 9. | "Regimen" | 2:36 |
| 10. | "Unbroken" | 3:50 |
| 11. | "Armageddon" | 1:13 |
| 12. | "No Cure (Sick of It All Cover) (European Bonus Track)" | 2:22 |

The name First Blood is taken from the movie First Blood featuring the famous character Rambo. Short sound clips from the movie are played at intervals throughout the album.
