= Eternal Lord =

British deathcore band

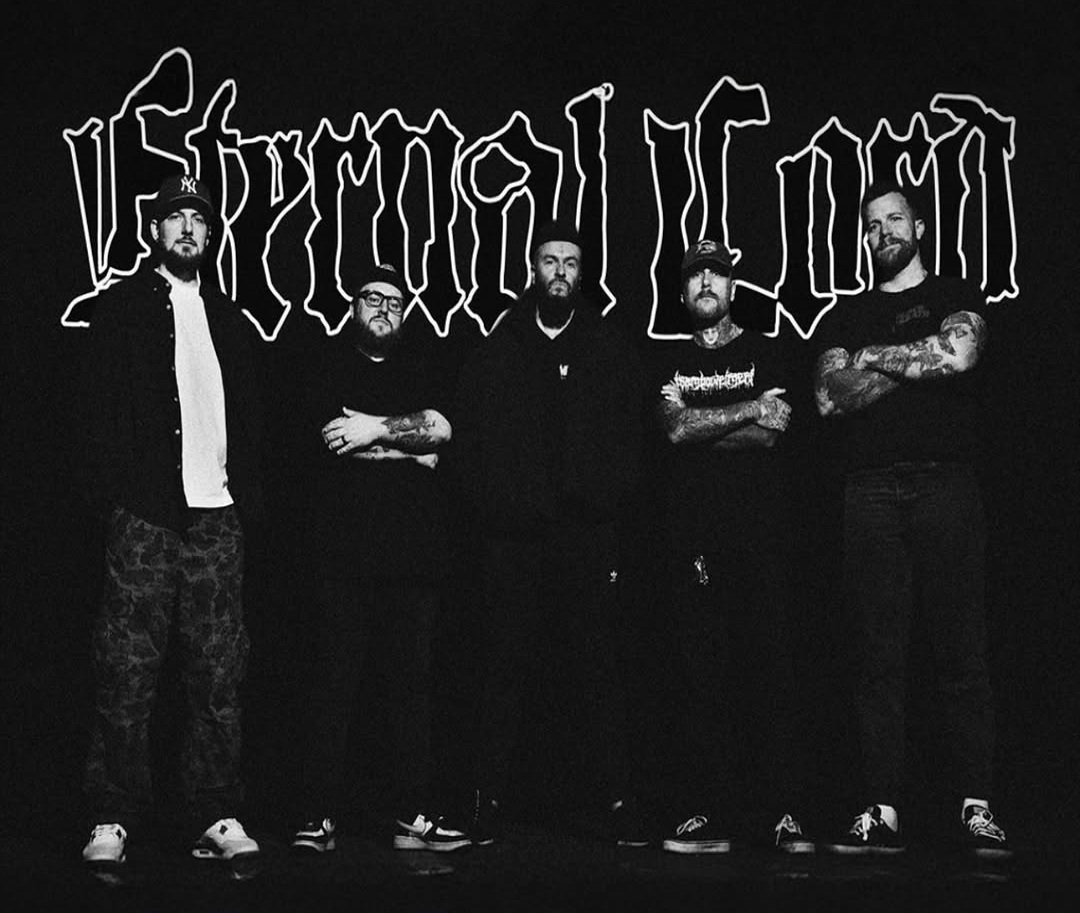

Background information
- Origin: Swindon, England
- Genre: Deathcore
- Years active: 2005–2008, 2025-present
- Labels: Thirty Days of Night, Golf, Ferret
- Members: Sam Ricketts - Vocals; Stu McKay - Drums; Sam Atkin - Bass; Shaun Zerebecki - Guitar; James Hackett - Guitar

Eternal Lord are an English deathcore band that formed in 2005, disbanded in 2008, and reformed in 2025

== History ==
Former members of The Hunt for Ida Wave and Burning Skies formed Eternal Lord in 2005. In 2006, the band issued their debut EP, which featured original vocalist Sam Ricketts. He left the band in 2007 to pursue a different career path. Former The Hunt for Ida Wave and I Killed The Prom Queen vocalist Ed Butcher replaced him. Throughout April 2007, they toured with All That Remains on their "The Fall of Ideals European Tour 2007" with Textures and Misery Signals.

Eternal Lord's debut album, Blessed Be This Nightmare, was released throughout the UK and Europe in March 2008 via Golf Records and in the US via Ferret Music. Butcher and Gregory wrote the album. In May 2008, drummer Stu McKay quit the band prior to embarking on a US tour with The Acacia Strain, All Shall Perish, and Since The Flood. In July 2008, Eddy Thrower was announced as the band's new drummer. During the band's UK summer headline tour of 2008, Butcher quit Eternal Lord to pursue firefighting. The band announced plans to replace him but instead dissolved.

The band announced their reunion in April 2025, with original members Sam Ricketts, Shaun Zerebecki, Stu McKay, Sam Atkin and James Hackett, who was briefly in the 2007 iteration of the band. Chris Gregory was the only original member not returning.

In October 2025, they released their first single, "Windstalker". Taking the band back to their roots with a familair sound to the split they released with Azriel (2006).

Their next studio EP will be released in 2026.

== Band members ==
Current lineup

- Sam Ricketts – vocals, (2005–2007) (2025-present)
- Sam Atkin a.k.a. Johnson – bass, (2005-2007) (2025-present)
- Shaun Zerebecki – guitar, (2005–2008) (2025-present)
- James Hackett – guitar, (2007) (2025-present)
- Stu Mckay – drums, percussion, (2005–2008) (2025-present)

Former

- Edward Butcher – vocals, writer, (2007–2008)
- Chris Gregory – guitar, (2005–2008)
- Nick Gardner – bass, (2007–2008)
- Edward Thrower – drums, percussion (2008)

== Discography ==
Studio album

- Blessed Be This Nightmare (Golf Records, 2008)

EPs

- Eternal Lord (Thirty Days of Night Records, 2006)
- Azriel/Eternal Lord Split CD (Thirty Days of Night Records, 2006)

Singles

- Windstalker (Self Released, 2025)
