= Against the Elements =

2002 studio album by Beyond the Embrace

Studio album by Beyond the Embrace
- Released: May 21, 2002
- Recorded: June–December 2001 at Euphoria Sound Studios
- Genre: Melodic death metal
- Producer: Beyond The Embrace and Aaron Clay

Beyond the Embrace chronology
Against the Elements (2002)	Insect Song (2004)

Against the Elements is the debut album by American melodic death metal band Beyond the Embrace.

Professional ratings
Review scores
Source	Rating
AllMusic	4/5 stars
Chronicles of Chaos	8/10 stars

== Track listing ==
No.	Title	Length
1.	"Bastard Screams"	5:38
2.	"Mourning in Magenta"	4:59
3.	"Compass"	3:05
4.	"Rapture"	5:00
5.	"Drowning Sun" (Instrumental)	3:33
6.	"Against the Elements"	4:31
7.	"Release"	3:50
8.	"The Bending Sea"	4:45
9.	"Embers Astray"	4:39
10.	"The Riddle of Steel" (Instrumental)	7:03

== Personnel ==
- Shawn Gallagher – vocals
- Alex Botelho – guitar
- Jeff Saude – guitar
- Oscar Gouveia – guitar
- Dan Jagoda – drums
- Chris Parlon – bass
