= Unfinished Business (Death Before Dishonor album) =

Studio album by Death Before Dishonor
- Released: July 26, 2019
- Genre: Hardcore punk
- Length: 21:33
- Label: Bridge 9
- Producer: Zeuss

Death Before Dishonor chronology
Better Ways to Die (2009)	Unfinished Business (2019)	Nowhere Bound (2025)

Singles from Unfinished Business
- 1. "Cowards Will Fall" Released: June 14, 2019; 2. "True Defeat" Released: July 16, 2019

Unfinished Business is the fifth studio album by Boston hardcore punk band Death Before Dishonor. It was released in 2019 on Bridge 9 Records. It marked the bands first release in 10 years since 2009’s Better Ways to Die.

== Overview ==
After the band had been quietly working on new material for over 10 years they finally announced their follow up to 2009’s Better Ways to Die on May 20, 2019. Unfinished Business seen Death Before Dishonor work with producer Zeuss. The albums first single "Cowards Will Fall" premiered on Revolver on June 14, 2019. The second and final single "True Defeat" was released on July 16.

The album officially premiered on Decibel on July 24, 2019. In an interview with the magazine lead singer Bryan Harris noted that with Unfinished Business he wanted to create something similar to the likes of Agnostic Front and Sick of It All in the 1990s.

The albums first music video was released on September 25, 2019, for the song "True Defeat" which was directed by Aviv Marotz. A second music video was later released for the song "Freedom Dies" which was directed by Nick Principe. Lead singer Bryan Harris stated the video is "a visual manual for a civilization on the edge of a dystopian nightmare turned reality."

== Critical reception ==
Professional ratings
Review scores
Source	Rating
Ghost Cult Magazine	7/10
Metal.de	8/10
Ox-Fanzine	4.5/5 stars

Ox-Fanzine stated "listening to them is a sheer delight: tracks like "True Defeat" and "Bad Blood" are ultimate mosh-pit firecrackers with choruses that hit home instantly." Metal.de wrote "Don't mistake it for 2019 New School Hardcore. Even though no single song stands out and the album won't be winning any awards for innovation, *Unfinished Business* impresses as a complete package." Hansel Lopez of Ghost Cult added "Death Before Dishonor dishes out the hardcore like the great poet Joey Diaz describes as "to sling dick with three hands." Such elegant prose rarely gets used in this publication, but Unfinished Business requires such language."

== Track list ==
No.	Title	Length
1.	"Cowards Will Fall"	1:38
2.	"True Defeat"	3:04
3.	"Freedom Dies"	3:20
4.	"Save Your Breath"	2:20
5.	"Bad Blood"	1:53
6.	"Haunted"	3:13
7.	"Left To Die"	2:35
8.	"Promises Of Yesterday"	3:34

== Personnel ==
Death Before Dishonor

- Bryan Harris – vocals
- Ben Hilton – drums
- Austin Sparkman – bass
- Colin Reilly – guitars
- Frankie Puopolo – guitars

Technical

- Zeuss — producer
