= Count Me In (Death Before Dishonor album) =

Studio album by Death Before Dishonor
- Released: May 22, 2007
- Genre: Hardcore punk
- Length: 21:51
- Label: Bridge 9
- Producer: Jim Siegel

Death Before Dishonor chronology
Friends Family Forever (2005)	Count Me In (2007)	Better Ways to Die (2009)

Count Me In is the third studio album by Boston hardcore punk band Death Before Dishonor. It was released in 2007 on Bridge 9 Records. The artwork for the album was designed by Converge vocalist Jacob Bannon.

The band began recording the album in October of 2006, with producer Jim Siegel at the Outpost studio in Stoughton, Massachusetts. It was mixed and mastered by May of 2007. Prior to the full albums release Death Before Dishonor released a limited 7" in that featured three songs from the album along with a cover song.

The album's single "Break Through It All" received significant play time on MTV Headbangers Ball.

The album sold 1,193 copies in its first week debuting at number 61 on the US Heatseekers chart.

== Critical reception ==
Professional ratings
Review scores
Source	Rating
AllMusic	3.5/5 stars
Lambgoat	7/10
Metal.de	9/10
Metal Injection	8/10
Ox-Fanzine	6/10
PunkNews	7/10

The album was met with positive reception Metal.de noted "I’d describe the whole thing as a masterclass in hardcore. It’s the hardcore counterpart to Bolt Thrower, so to speak. Blistering speed and mosh-worthy intensity of the highest caliber! Listening to this record is simply a joy." Metal Injection praised the albums production stating "the recording quality is top notch. All the instruments come out really well, they’re all easy to pick out, and they all sound very powerful. Even the bass player gets a fair shot at being heard with the rest of the band, as he comes out so well that he becomes an integral part to DEATH BEFORE DISHONORs signature voice."

Greg Prato of AllMusic stated " Death Before Dishonor merge drill-instructor vocal barking and gang-shouted choruses with metallic, crunchy riffs and brisk tempos." PunkNews praised Bryan Harris vocals on the album adding "Harris' vocals are more intense than ever, and the rest of the band adds plenty of little wrinkles to insure that nothing grows stale this time. Those gang vocals were one of those wrinkles, and the call-and-answer style of delivery towards the end of the song is a welcome addition to their approach."

== Track list ==
No.	Title	Length
1.	"Count Me In"	1:15
2.	"Nowhere To Turn"	2:23
3.	"Break Through It All"	2:08
4.	"Curl Up And Die"	3:01
5.	"Behind Your Eyes"	2:20
6.	"Fuck It All"	2:23
7.	"See It Through"	2:07
8.	"Nothing But Agony"	2:31
9.	"Infected"	1:49
10.	"Take Me Away"	1:41
11.	"Still Standing"	1:40
12.	"[Untitled hidden track]"	2:08
13.	"[Untitled hidden track]"	2:31

== Charts ==
Chart (2007)	Peak position
US Heatseekers	61
