= Hallows Eve =

- Origin: Atlanta, Georgia
- Genres: Thrash metal, speed metal
- Years active: 1982-1989, 2004-present
- Label: Metal Blade Records

Hallows Eve is an American thrash/speed metal band from Atlanta, formed in 1982 or 1983. Their material was distributed by Metal Blade Records.

== History ==
Their song "Metal Merchants" was featured in the sixth installment of Metal Massacre, a series of compilations released by Metal Blade Records. Their debut album is titled Tales of Terror and was released through Metal Blade in 1985. It was re-released by Metal Blade in 2021. Their second album was called Death and Insanity, released in 1986. AllMusic said it was the band's most popular effort of their career. The third album Monument came in 1988. AllMusic referred to these releases "competent but indistinctive thrash metal". The band broke up in 1989 and reformed in 2004. They brought in Steve Cannon to perform lead vocals, who served as editor-in-chief of Vibrations of Doom, which Blabbermouth said was the world's longest-running online music magazine. That year, they announced that they had begun work on a new album. It was due to be released in 2005, titled Evil Never Dies. Several months later, it was announced that Cannon had been ejected from the band. He shared a lengthy statement expressing his dissatisfaction with how the decision was handled, and disclosed that he was unemployed and was facing homelessness. In 2010, the band announced that they had brought in a new drummer named "Scooch".

== Musical style and influences ==
The lyrical themes of Hollows Eve include death and insanity. They were known for incorporating horror-themed theatrics into their aesthetic, drawing influence from American rock singer Alice Cooper. Decibel stated that the band's style of early speed metal was derived from Exciter, as well as Black Sabbath and the new wave of British heavy metal. Some of the material on the band's debut album was described as "Maiden-esque". Decibel also stated that while vocalist Stacy Anderson was capable of heavy metal singing, his harsher vocals could be considered borderline death growls. Tommy Stewart’s heavy metal bass playing drew comparisons to Lemmy of Motörhead's style. There were also elements of punk rock in the band's early sound, according to Ghost Cult Magazine.

== Discography ==
- Tales of Terror (1985)
- Death and Insanity (1986)
- Monument (1989)

== Band members ==
- Stacy Andersen – lead vocals
- Tommy Stewart – bass, vocals
- Doyle Bright – guitars
- David Stuart - guitar
- Steve "Skullator" Shoemaker - guitar
- Ronny Appoldt - drums
- Brandon Ottinger - guitar
- Dane Jensen - drums
- Steve Cannon - lead vocals
- Scooch - drums
