= Knights of the Abyss =

American deathcore band

- Origin: Glendale, Arizona
- Genre: Deathcore
- Years active: 2005–2010, 2015, 2022–present
- Labels: Ferret, Siege of Amida
- Members: Nick Florence; Andy Rysdam; Cody Brechtel; Gabe Santillan; Mark Brice

Knights of the Abyss are an American deathcore band from Glendale, Arizona, United States, formed in 2005.

== Biography ==
Knights of the Abyss was formed in 2005 after drummer Andy Rysdam left Job for a Cowboy. They have recorded two full-length albums, released by Siege of Amida Records and Ferret Music. Early songs featured original vocalist Phil Noriega. Dustin Hadlock, who had provided guest vocals on older tracks, stepped in to record the rest of the album and tour with the band throughout January 2008. The band announced signing to Ferret Music. The song "A New Darkened Faith" from their first Ferret album, Shades, was posted on the band's Myspace page in early April. All vocals on Shades were performed Dustin Curtis of the band A Breath Before Surfacing from Tucson, Arizona. The band has toured in the United States and the United Kingdom, playing alongside bands such as Elysia and Arsonists Get All the Girls. Elysia's vocalist, Zak Vargas, was featured on the song "Decaying Waste" from the album Juggernaut.

At the start of 2009, many original members of Knights of the Abyss left to return to school. Hadlock was re-appointed vocalist, and drummer James Gillespie, guitarist Brian McNulty, and bass guitarist Griffin Kolinski joined. Kolinski and McNulty also play in Arizona metal band The Blood Countess. Hadlock and Gillespie were recruited from Nick Florence's side project, Decessus. Florence is the only remaining original member of the band. Knights of the Abyss announced that they had returned to the studio to demo and record a follow-up to Shades. On May 3, 2009, the band posted a new song in pre-production, dubbed "Pandemic", as a sign they were recording their newest album. By May 1, 2010, the band had completed recording their third full-length album, The Culling of Wolves.

Knights of the Abyss launched the first single for The Culling of Wolves, "Deceiver's Creed", on their Myspace and Facebook pages in July 2010. The album was released August 17, 2010 via Ferret Music. They announced two separate U.S. fall tours. "The Culling of Wolves Tour" featured Conducting from the Grave, Enfold Darkness, and The World We Knew. "The California Blood Tour" included Cattle Decapitation, Devourment, Burning the Masses, and Son of Aurelius.

Former band member Griffin Kolinski died on July 20, 2015, aged 28, from congestive heart failure.

The band reunited in 2022, teasing the single "Entrenched in Stench".

In October 2022, founder and original drummer Andy Rysdam returned to the band.

== Band members ==
=== Current members ===
- Nick Florence – guitar (2005–2012, 2015, 2022–present)
- Andy Rysdam – drums (2005–2008, 2022–present)
- Cody Brechtel – guitar (2005–2009, 2022–present)
- Mark Brice – vocals (2009 touring; 2023–present)
- Gabe Santillan – bass (2022–present)

=== Former members ===
- J.M. Campbell – bass (2005–2006)
- Phil Noriega – vocals (2005–2006)
- John Seabury – bass (2006–2007)
- Mike Mannheimer – vocals (2006–2007, 2008–2009)
- Aaron Stone – bass, vocals (2007–2008)
- Dustin Hadlock – vocals (2007–2008, 2009–2010)
- Peter Ridegway – touring keyboards (2008–2009)
- Griffin " The Father" Kolinski – bass (2009–2012);(died 2015)
- Ben Harclerode – drums (2009–2010)
- James Gillespie – drums (2009)
- Logan Paul "Harley Magnum" Kavanaugh – vocals (2010–2012, 2015)
- Brian McNulty – guitar (2009–2012, 2015)
- Mark Gray – drums (2022)
- Cameron Martin - vocals (2022-2023)

== Discography ==
=== Studio albums ===
- Juggernaut (2007)
- Shades (2008)
- The Culling of Wolves (2010)

=== Other releases ===
- Decapitation of the Dark Ages (EP, 2005)
- Demo 2006
- Entrenched in Stench (Single, 2022)
