= Cannae (band) =

American metalcore band

- Origin: Boston, Massachusetts, U.S.
- Genres: Thrash metal, metalcore
- Years active: 2000–present
- Label: Prosthetic Records

Cannae (pronounced KA-nigh) is an American metalcore band from Boston, Massachusetts. Their style mixes death metal, hardcore and thrash metal, with a focus on dual guitar work (guitarist Alex Vieira was formerly with Capharnaum), heavy, double bass drumming and both growling and screaming vocals. They are currently signed to Prosthetic Records.

== Members ==
=== Current members ===
- Adam DuLong – vocals
- Stephen Colombo – guitar
- Shane Frisby – bass
- Alex Vieira – guitar

=== Former members ===
- Colin Conway – drums
- Jason Zucco– guitar
- Daniel Campenella – bass
- Michael Boutillette – drums

== Discography ==
- Demo (1999)
- Troubleshooting Death (2000) – Eastcoast Empire, re-released on Brutal Records
- Horror (2003) – Prosthetic Records
- Gold Becomes Sacrifice (2005) – Prosthetic Records
