= Better Ways to Die =

Studio album by Death Before Dishonor
- Released: July 28, 2009
- Genre: Hardcore punk
- Length: 24:16
- Label: Bridge 9

Death Before Dishonor chronology
| Count Me In (2007) | Better Ways to Die (2009) | Unfinished Business (2019) |

Professional ratings
Review scores
| Source | Rating |
|---|---|
| AllMusic | 3.5/5 stars |

Better Ways to Die is the fourth studio album by Boston hardcore punk band Death Before Dishonor. It was released in 2009 on Bridge 9 Records.

== Track list ==
| No. | Title | Length |
|---|---|---|
| 1. | "Peace and Quiet" | 1:15 |
| 2. | "Remember" | 2:11 |
| 3. | "Coffin Nail" | 2:23 |
| 4. | "Fuck This Year" | 1:51 |
| 5. | "Boys in Blue" | 2:15 |
| 6. | "Better Ways to Die" | 2:50 |
| 7. | "So Far From Home" | 3:02 |
| 8. | "Black Cloud" | 2:04 |
| 9. | "No More Lies" | 1:54 |
| 10. | "Bloodlust" | 2:03 |
| 11. | "Our Glory Days" | 2:28 |
