= True till Death =

True Till Death

Studio album by Death Before Dishonor
- Released: March 15, 2002
- Genre: Hardcore punk
- Length: 42:33
- Label: Spook City

Death Before Dishonor chronology
Wartime (2001)	True Till Death (2002)	Friends Family Forever (2005)

True Till Death is the first studio album by Boston hardcore punk band Death Before Dishonor. It was released in 2002 on Spook City Records.

In celebration of True Till Death's 20th anniversary, DBD re-released the record with new cover art, along with the original demo tracks from their self released "War Time" demo. They later held a headling tour in the Spring of 2023, in celebration of the albums 20th anniversary.

== Track listing ==
No.	Title	Length
1.	"Intro"	0:49
2.	"True till Death"	4:03
3.	"Nowhere Bound"	4:07
4.	"Another Day"	3:03
5.	"Time To Die"	3:27
6.	"Torn Apart"	3:12
7.	"Seven"	1:48
8.	"Forever Alone"	3:56
9.	"Hopeless"	5:17
10.	"Slut Song"	1:35
11.	"Play Your Part"	3:29
12.	"Endless Suffering"	2:13
13.	"Nothing But Agony"	1:57
14.	"Under My Skin"	3:37
