= Beyond the Embrace =

American melodic death metal band

Beyond The Embrace
- Origin: New Bedford, Massachusetts
- Genres: Melodic Metal
- Years active: 2000–present
- Label: Metal Blade Records
- Members: Oscar Gouveia; Jeff Saude; Chris Parlon; Kevin Camille

Beyond The Embrace is an American Melodic Metal band. They formed in New Bedford, Massachusetts in January 2000. The band has released two albums to date, Against the Elements in 2002 and Insect Song in 2004. They were signed to Metal Blade Records. Their first two albums featured vocalist and keyboardist Shawn Gallagher, bassist Adam Gonsalves, and drummers Mike Bresciani and Kevin Camille, the band featured the work of three guitarists: Alex Botelho, Oscar Gouveia, and Jeff Saude. After a 16 year hiatus the band has currently reformed with four of the original members, Oscar Gouveia on lead guitar and vocals, Jeff Saude on guitar and vocals, Chris Parlon on bass, and Kevin Camille on Drums. The band is currently writing new material and will be recording a new studio album for a tentative 2025 release. They will be performing live for the first time in 16 years at the end of November in 2024 in their home of Massachusetts, more details to be announced shortly.

== Current members ==
- Oscar Gouveia - guitar, vocals (2000–present)
- Jeff Saude - guitar, vocals (2000–present)
- Chris Parlon - bass (2004–present)
- Kevin Camille - drums (2002-2005, present)

== Previous members ==
- Kenneth Paul Benda - vocals (2005-2011)
- Shawn Gallagher - vocals, keyboard (2000-2007)
- Mike Bresciani - drums (2000-2002)
- Steve Bolognese - drums (2005-2007)
- Chris Haskell - drums (2007-2008)
- Adam Gonsalves - bass (2002-2004)
- Alex Botelho - guitar (2000-2007)
- Dan Jagoda - drums (2008-2011)

== Studio albums ==
- Against the Elements (2002)
- Insect Song (2004)
