= Pissing Razors =

American groove metal band

- Origin: El Paso, Texas, U.S.
- Genre: Groove metal
- Years active: 1993–2004, 2014–present
- Labels: Noise, Spitfire, Art Is War
- Members: Eddy Garcia; Mat Lynch; Joe Rodriguez; Geo Gomez
- Past members: Danny Garcia; Dave "Loco" McNutt; Rick Valles; Cesar Soto; Jason Bragg; Matt Difabio; Andre Acosta; Dave McNutt
- Website: Pissing Razors on X

Pissing Razors is an American groove metal band formed in El Paso, Texas in 1993. Their most recent album Eulogy Death March was released in 2021.

== History ==
The band was started by brothers Eddy and Danny Garcia in 1993. Eddy played guitar and Danny played drums, and they were joined by singer Dave McNutt and bassist Mat Lynch. McNutt soon departed and was replaced by Joe Rodriquez. They self-released an album titled Psycho Punko Metal Groove in 1996. By 1997, Danny Garcia had departed and Eddy Garcia switched to drums while Lynch switched to guitar, with Rick Valles joining on bass. A self-titled debut album was released in 1998 by Noise Records.

The band's lineup remained stable until 1999, when Lynch departed and was replaced by Cesar Soto. In 2000, they contributed to the album Panther: A Tribute to Pantera. The band's next two albums were affected by unstable lineups. Rodriguez departed in 2000 and was replaced by Jason Bragg, who lasted for about one year and was replaced in turn by Andre Acosta. By 2003, Soto had been replaced by Matt Difabio; this lineup released the album Evolution.

The band split in 2004. After being defunct for a decade, the band reunited in 2014 with original members Eddy Garcia and Mat Lynch, plus returning singer Joe Rodriguez and new bassist Geo Gomez. The stand-alone single "Wasting Away", a Nailbomb cover, was released in early 2021. Their first new album in 18 years, Eulogy Death March, was released in October 2021.

== Band members ==
=== Current ===
- Eddy Garcia – drums (1997–2004, 2014–present), guitars (1994–1996)
- Mat Lynch – guitars (1997–1999, 2014–present), bass (1994–1996)
- Joe Rodriguez – vocals (1995–2000, 2014–present)
- Geo Gomez – bass (2014–present)

=== Former ===
- Dave McNutt – vocals (1994; died 2013)
- Danny Garcia – drums (1994–1996)
- Cesar Soto – guitars (1999–2002)
- Jason Bragg – vocals (2000–2001)
- Andre Acosta – vocals (2001–2004)
- Matt Difabio – guitars (2002–2004)
- Rick Valles – bass (1997–2004)

== Discography ==
=== Studio albums ===
- Psycho Punko Metal Groove (Independent, 1996)
- Pissing Razors (Noise Records, 1998)
- Cast Down the Plague (Noise Records, 1999)
- Fields of Disbelief (Noise Records, 2000)
- Where We Come From (Spitfire Records, 2001)
- Evolution (Spitfire Records, 2003)
- Eulogy Death March (Razor Records, 2021)

=== Live albums ===
- Live in the Devil's Triangle (Spitfire Records, 2002)
