= Ligeia (American band) =

American metalcore band

- Origin: Palmer, Massachusetts, U.S.
- Genre: Metalcore
- Years active: 2003–2009, 2010–2011
- Label: Ferret
- Members: Keith Holuk; Ryan Ober; Brandon Whipple; Michael Comeiro
- Website: https://facebook.com/LigeiaBand

Ligeia was an American metalcore band from Massachusetts, formed in 2003. The group is named after a short story by Edgar Allan Poe.

== History ==
Originally formed in the winter of 2003 by Keith Holuk and Ryan Ober, Ligeia solidified their lineup with the additions of Brandon Whipple and Patrick Murphy in 2007. Their debut album, Your Ghost Is a Gift, was recorded in December 2004 by Ken Susi of Unearth and released in late March 2006 on Ferret Music. Ligeia released their second album, Bad News, in August 2008 on Ferret Records.

Ligeia has maintained an independent work ethic since their inception and claim to have played over 600 shows, including a highly successful run on the "Two Dollar Brawler" tour in 2007.

Ligeia has toured across the U.S. and Canada extensively, as well as in the UK, Europe and South America. They have toured with such bands as The Acacia Strain, Misery Signals, Haste The Day, Remembering Never, and August Burns Red.

=== Breakup ===
On May 21, 2009, Ligeia failed to show up to a scheduled show in Connecticut at the El-N-Gee Club. On May 22, 2009, they also no-showed a scheduled show in Rochester, New York, at The Jukebox. Upon contacting Ligeia, they indicated that they had disbanded.

On May 23, 2009, three days into their US/Australia tour with Deez Nuts, an announcement was made on their Myspace page that they were breaking up. Singer Keith Holuk disclosed on his Myspace page that the band is currently on "hiatus" although no official press release has been given.

=== Reunion (2010–2011) ===
Ligeia announced on June 15, 2010 via their Myspace page that the band's hiatus was over and they were working on a new album.

Ligeia's comeback show took place in Moosup, Connecticut on February 1, 2011, just days before they head back to Canada for their "Fear of Freezing" Headlining Tour with the Canadian bands A Sight For Sewn Eyes and Right Before the Rise. The tour spanned from Ontario and Quebec from February 4–26, 2011, with the kickoff show being held in London, ON.

On July 31, 2011, Ligeia entered The Bear's Den Recording Studio with producer Jay DeLuca to begin recording new material.

=== Welcome to Palm City (2011) ===
On November 3, 2011, the band released a studio update video which included the song "Simulated Drowning", the band's first release since 2008. The EP "Welcome To Palm City" was released completely free and available on their website for fans to download. The album was produced and recorded by Jay DeLuca, and mastered by Kris Crummett.

== Band members ==
=== Current lineup ===
- Keith Holuk – vocals (2003–2009, 2010–2011)
- Ryan Ober – guitar (2003–2009, 2010–2011)
- Brandon Whipple – bass (2007–2009, 2010–2011)
- Michael Comeiro – drums (2008, 2011)

=== Previous members ===
- Phil Fonseca – drums (2003–2006, 2008–2009)
- Matthew Bennett – bass (2003–2006) (died 2026)
- Chris Keane – guitar (2003–2006)
- Don Fogarty – bass (2006)
- Bryan Forbes – bass (2006-200?)
- Ryan Irizarry – drums (2006-200?)
- Jake Lawrence – drums (2007)
- Michael Comeiro – drums (2008)
- Nick Neumeister – drums (2008)
- Patrick Murphy – drums
- Jeanne Sagan – bass
- Eric "Rabbit" Gross – drums (2010–2011)

== Discography ==
Date of release	Title	Label
January 2004	Lifetime Black Out	Independent
March 21, 2006	Your Ghost Is a Gift	Ferret Music
August 5, 2008	Bad News	Ferret Music
November 11, 2011	Welcome to Palm City – EP	Independent

=== Music videos ===
- "Beyond a Doubt" from Your Ghost Is a Gift
- "Household Stereotypes" from Your Ghost Is a Gift
- "I've Been Drinkin'" from Bad News
