= Ferret Music =

American independent record label

- Parent company: Warner Music Group
- Founded: 1996
- Founder: Carl Severson
- Distributors: Fontana, eOne Music, ADA
- Genre: Metalcore, post-hardcore, hardcore punk, heavy metal
- Country of origin: U.S.
- Location: West Windsor, New Jersey
- Official website: ferretmusic.com

Ferret Music is an American independent record label turned Warner Music Group subsidiary, founded in 1996. The label is owned by metalcore band NORA's vocalist, Carl Severson, and based in West Windsor, New Jersey. Ferret recently started an imprint called New Weathermen Records. Warner Music Group's Alternative Distribution Alliance acquired a stake in Ferret Music in August, 2006, and as a result is currently distributed by Fontana Distribution, Alternative Distribution Alliance and eOne Music.

As of September 12, 2007, Ferret partnered with an uprising extreme metal and hardcore punk label out of the UK, Siege of Amida Records (S.O.A.R.). S.O.A.R will retain A&R responsibilities. On February 18, 2010, Carl Severson and his business partner at Ferret and ChannelZERO, Paul Conroy, announced their departure from the company to start Good Fight Entertainment, a management company with music and sports divisions along with a new record label. Ferret's official website was last updated in 2009, adding to speculation that the label is defunct. According to Scott Mellinger, lead guitarist for Zao, Ferret Records sold to Warner Music while Severson went on to start Good Fight.

In July 2026, it was announced that Ferret founder Carl Severson had regained control of the label and would return it to active business, signing acts Bore and Wounded Touch. Severson also announced a 20th anniversary re-issue of Remembering Never's 2006 album God Save Us, which will be pressed on vinyl for the first time. Ferret has since reissued albums by acts such as The Banner, Endeavor, Racetraitor, Old Wounds and Torn Apart (some of which were originally released on Good Fight).

== Current artists ==
- Bore
- Wounded Touch

== Past artists ==
- 36 Crazyfists (disbanded)
- A Life Once Lost (disbanded)
- A Static Lullaby (active, unsigned)
- All Chrome (disbanded)
- Annotations of an Autopsy (active, unsigned)
- Blood Has Been Shed (disbanded)
- Boris The Blade (disbanded)
- Boys Night Out (active, with Good Fight Music)
- Burnt by the Sun (reformed 2026)
- blessthefall (active, on Rise Records)
- Cataract (disbanded)
- Chimaira (partially active)
- Dead Hearts (disbanded)
- Disembodied (active, on Good Fight Music)
- The Devil Wears Prada (active, on Solid State Records)
- Elysia (disbanded)
- Eternal Lord (disbanded)
- Every Time I Die (disbanded)
- For the Love of... (active)
- Foxy Shazam (active, with I.R.S. Records)
- From Autumn to Ashes (active, unsigned)
- Full Blown Chaos (active on Ironclad Recordings)
- Funeral for a Friend (active)
- Gwen Stacy (disbanded)
- Harvest (active)
- Heavy Heavy Low Low (active, unsigned)
- Hellmouth (active, on Paper+Plastick Records)
- In Flames (active, with Nuclear Blast Records)
- Ice Nine Kills (active, with Fearless Records)
- Johnny Truant (disbanded)
- Killswitch Engage (active, with Metal Blade Records)
- Knights of the Abyss (on hiatus since 2012)
- Luddite Clone (disbanded)
- Ligeia (disbanded)
- LoveHateHero (disbanded)
- Lower Definition (active, Independent)
- Madball (active, with Good Fight Music)
- Martyr A.D. (disbanded)
- Maylene and the Sons of Disaster (active, Independent)
- Misery Signals (disbanded)
- NORA (active, with Good Fight Music)
- Poison the Well (active)
- Remembering Never (disbanded)
- Revolution Mother (on hiatus)
- Scarlet (on hiatus)
- See You Next Tuesday (Active, Good Fight Music)
- Shadows Fall (active)
- Skycamefalling (disbanded)
- Suicide Note (disbanded)
- The Banner (active, with Good Fight Music)
- The Break (disbanded)
- The Bronx (active, with White Drugs)
- The Hottness (disbanded)
- The Rise (active, with ReIgnition Records)
- Torn Apart (disbanded)
- Twelve Tribes (disbanded)
- Union (disbanded)
- Underneath the Gun (disbanded)
- Upon Disfigurement (on hiatus)
- xBishopx (disbanded)
- Waking the Cadaver (active, with Unique Leader Records)
- Zao (active, currently unsigned)

== S.O.A.R. artists ==
- Against the Flood
- Ageless Oblivion
- Annotations of an Autopsy (Also on Nuclear Blast)
- Ancient Ascendant
- Armed for Apocalypse
- As They Burn
- Awaken Demons
- Belial
- Betraeus
- Cult Cinema
- Dead Beyond Buried
- Demoraliser
- Diskreet
- Dripback
- Dyscarnate
- Eradication
- Heart in Hand
- Ingested
- Malevolence
- Martyr Defiled
- The Breathing Process
- The Bridal Procession
- TRC
- Waking The Cadaver

== Past S.O.A.R Artists ==
- A Girl a Gun a Ghost (disbanded)
- Belie My Burial (active, unsigned)
- Chaos Blood (disbanded)
- Chase the Sunset (formerly known as Endurance of Hate)(Active, Unsigned)
- Clone the Fragile (disbanded)
- Dignity Dies First (disbanded)
- Forever Never (active, Unsigned)
- Impending Doom (active, with eONE music)
- Implosive Disgorgence (disbanded)
- Knights of the Abyss (disbanded)
- Last House on the Left (Active, Unsigned)
- Horror of the Sky (disbanded)
- My Cross to Bare (reformed 2021)
- Rose Funeral (active, with Metal Blade Records)
- The Adept (active, unsigned)
- The Irish Front (disbanded)
- The Partisan Turbine (disbanded)
- The Plasmarifle (active, unsigned)
- The Red Death (disbanded)
- The Red Shore (disbanded)
- Titans (disbanded)
- Viatrophy (disbanded)
- Wecamewithbrokenteeth (disbanded in 2008, reformed in 2009 and then disbanded again in 2010)
- Whitechapel (active, with Metal Blade Records)

== See also ==
- List of record labels

== Other sources ==
- Warner Music Group news release August 7, 2006
- Martens, Todd, "Ferret's New Partner", Billboard, 00062510, September 2, 2006, Vol. 118, Issue 35
