= Chimaira discography =

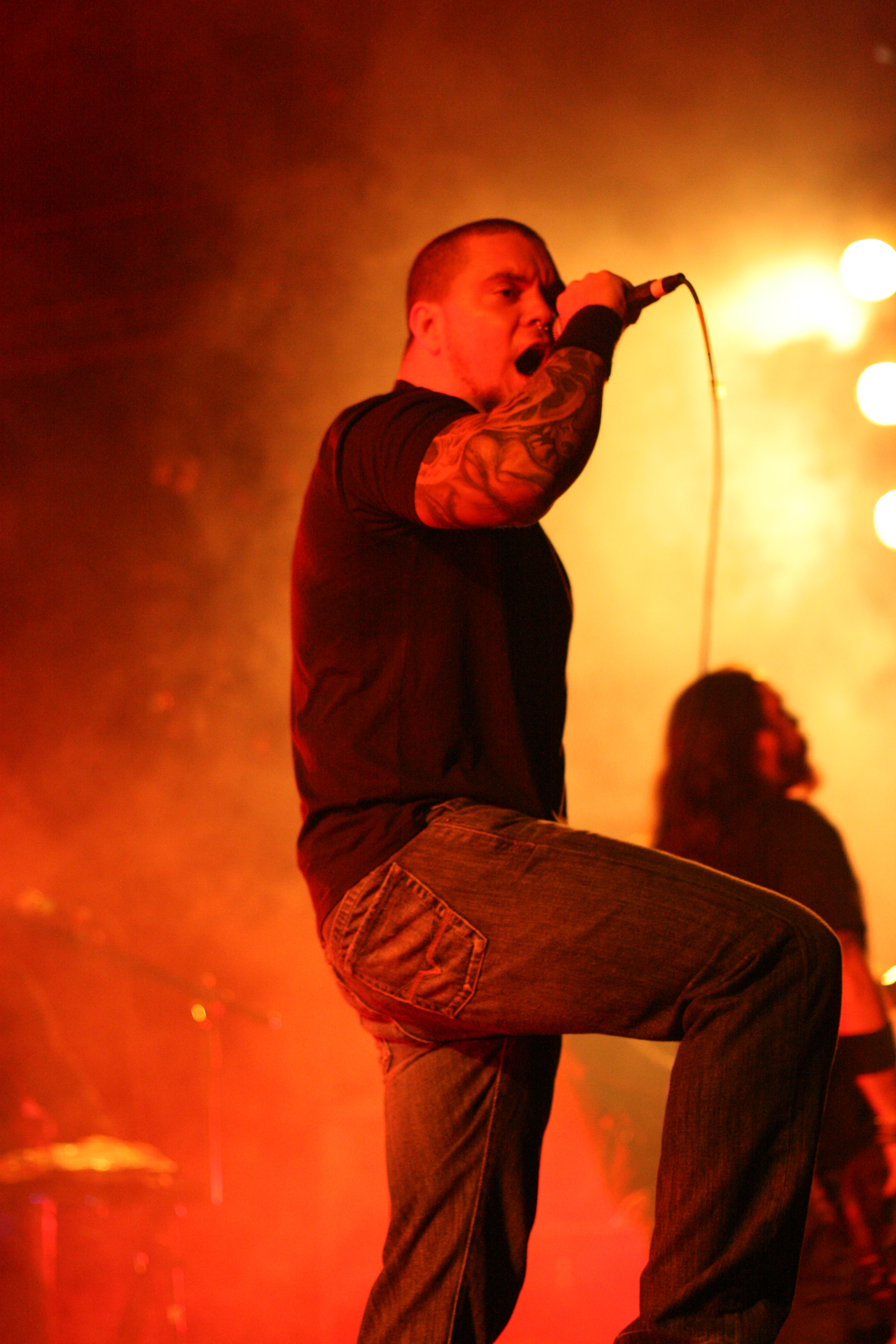
- Mark Hunter performing live with Chimaira at the Nokia Theatre Times Square on June 25, 2008.
- Studio albums: 7
- Extended plays: 2
- Singles: 11
- Video albums: 2
- Music videos: 13

The discography of American heavy metal band Chimaira consists of seven studio albums, two extended plays, eleven singles, two video albums and thirteen music videos. Chimaira originated in Cleveland, Ohio, composed of vocalist Mark Hunter, guitarists Jason Hager and Rob Arnold, bassist Jim LaMarca, drummer Andols Herrick and programmer Chris Spicuzza. Hager was replaced by Matt DeVries in 2001. Chimaira's first release was an extended play, This Present Darkness, which sold 10,000 copies. After signing to Roadrunner Records, the band's debut studio album, Pass Out of Existence, was released in August 2001. A second studio album, The Impossibility of Reason, followed in 2003, debuting and peaking at number 117 on the Billboard 200. Herrick was replaced by drummer Kevin Talley, formerly of Misery Index, in 2004. A video album, The Dehumanizing Process, arrived later that year, documenting the writing and recording process behind The Impossibility of Reason. Chimaira released a self-titled album in August 2005, which peaked at number 74 on the Billboard 200. After an internal crisis due to pressure from the label for a new release, the band moved on from Roadrunner and signed a new deal with Ferret Music. In early 2006, Herrick rejoined the band and Chimaira recorded their fourth studio album Resurrection, which appeared in early March 2007. Resurrection peaked at number 42 on the Billboard 200.

== Albums ==
=== Studio albums ===
List of studio albums, with selected chart positions
Title	Album details	Peak chart positions									
Title	Album details	US	US Hard Rock	AUS	AUT	BEL (WA)	FIN	FRA	GER	NLD	UK
Pass Out of Existence	Released: October 2, 2001 (US); Label: Roadrunner; Formats: CD, digital download	—	—	—	—	—	—	—	—	—	—
The Impossibility of Reason	Released: May 13, 2003 (US); Label: Roadrunner; Formats: CD, digital download	117	—	—	—	—	—	—	—	—	133
Chimaira	Released: August 9, 2005 (US); Label: Roadrunner; Formats: CD, digital download	74	—	45	—	—	—	69	60	97	62
Resurrection	Released: March 6, 2007 (US); Label: Ferret, Nuclear Blast; Formats: CD, digital download	42	—	79	58	—	—	104	71	99	76
The Infection	Released: April 20, 2009 (US); Label: Ferret, Nuclear Blast; Formats: CD, LP, digital download	30	4	81	71	97	32	109	85	—	155
The Age of Hell	Released: August 16, 2011 (US); Label: eOne; Formats: CD, LP, digital download	54	3	—	—	—	—	—	—	—	—
Crown of Phantoms	Released: July 30, 2013 (US); Label: eOne; Formats: CD, LP, digital download	52	4	86	—	—	—	—	—	—	—
"—" denotes a recording that did not chart or was not released in that territory.

=== Video albums ===
List of video albums
Title	Album details
The Dehumanizing Process	Released: October 26, 2004 (US); Label: Roadrunner; Formats: DVD
Coming Alive	Released: July 20, 2010 (US); Label: Ferret, Nuclear Blast; Formats: DVD, CD, digital download

=== Extended plays ===
List of extended plays
Title	Album details
This Present Darkness	Released: January 11, 2000 (US); Label: East Coast Empire; Formats: CD
The Age of Remix Hell	Released: December 24, 2011 (US); Label: eOne; Formats: Digital download

== Singles ==
List of singles, showing year released and album name
Title	Year	Album
"Down Again"	2003	The Impossibility of Reason
"Eyes of a Criminal"	2005	The Impossibility of Reason
"Nothing Remains"	2005	Chimaira
"Resurrection"	2007	Resurrection
"Secrets of the Dead"	2009	The Infection
"Wild Thing"	2011	Non-album single
"Trigger Finger"	2011	The Age of Hell
"Born in Blood"	2011	The Age of Hell
"The Age of Hell"	2011	The Age of Hell
"All That's Left Is Blood"	2013	Crown of Phantoms
"No Mercy"	2013	Crown of Phantoms

== Guest appearances ==
List of non-single guest appearances, showing year released and album name
Title	Year	Album
"Fascination Street"	2000	Disintegrated: A Tribute to the Cure
"Balls to the Wall"	2001	ECW Anarchy Rocks: Extreme Music, Vol. 2
"Army of Me"	2003	Freddy vs. Jason soundtrack
"Threnody"	2006	Masters of Horror, Vol. 2 soundtrack
"Paralyzed"	2007	Resident Evil: Extinction soundtrack
"Warpath"	2009	Saw VI soundtrack

== Music videos ==
Year	Title	Director
2002	"Sp Lit"	Todd Bell
2003	"Pure Hatred"	Todd Bell
2003	"Down Again"	P. R. Brown
2004	"Power Trip"	Lex Halaby
2005	"Nothing Remains"	Shane Drake
2006	"Save Ourselves"	
2007	"Resurrection"	Todd Bell
2009	"Destroy and Dominate"	Todd Bell
2011	"Year of the Snake"	
2013	"All That's Left Is Blood"	
2013	"No Mercy"	
2014	"Wrapped in Violence"	Alex Morgan
2014	"Crown of Phantoms"	Alex Morgan
