= The Age of Remix Hell =

EP by Chimaira
- Released: December 24, 2011
- Genre: Groove metal Electronic
- Length: 17:16
- Label: E1 Music

Chimaira chronology
The Age of Hell (2011)	The Age of Remix Hell (2011)	Crown of Phantoms (2013)

Professional ratings
Review scores
Source	Rating
PitRiff	8/10 stars

The Age of Remix Hell is a digital EP by American metal band Chimaira. The album was released for free online on December 24, 2011, through Multiupload.com.

== Track listing ==
All tracks are written by Chimaira.

No.	Title	Remixed by	Length
1.	"Year of the Snake" (Dubba Jonny Mix)	Dubba Jonny	4:10
2.	"Clockwork" (Hunter Mix)	Mark Hunter	4:20
3.	"Year of the Snake" (Allinaline Mix)	Jeremy Creamer	4:17
4.	"Losing My Mind" (Allinaline Mix)	Jeremy Creamer	4:29
Total length:			17:16

== Personnel ==
- Mark Hunter – vocals, keyboards, samples
- Rob Arnold – lead guitar, rhythm guitar, bass guitar
- Ben Schigel – drums
