= Stemm (band) =

American metal band

STEMM
- Origin: Niagara Falls, New York, U.S.
- Genres: Nu metal, groove metal, metalcore, hardcore punk
- Years active: 1998–2012, 2019–present
- Label: Catch 22, I Scream
- Members: Joe Cafarella; Danny Nelligan; Stephen Crowl; Alex Scouten
- Past members: Louis J. Penque III; Fred Blackwell; Jimi Penque; Russ Martin; Rich Spalla; TJ Frost; Mario Nobilio
- Website: stemmband.com

STEMM is an American heavy metal band from Niagara Falls, New York. STEMM was formed in 1998 by Joe Cafarella and Jimi Penque, along with Louis Penque, Russ Martin, and Alex Scouten, made up the original lineup of the band. Alex left the band in 1999 and was briefly replaced by guitarist Fred Blackwell. Rich Spalla replaced Fred shortly after. This lineup remained intact until 2003. Joe and Rich merged with drummer Danny Nelligan (SKUNgK), bassist Stephen Crowl (SKUNgK), and vocalist TJ Frost (Yellow No. 5) of Buffalo band 5 Years Gone, to create a new incarnation of the band. This lineup also saw a change in the musical direction of the band from hardcore/rap to more of a metalcore act.

This lineup's first two shows were a showcase for Metal Blade Records, opening for major act, Sevendust. The band performed on many Jägermeister Tours overtime, opening for major/large acts such as Hatebreed, Chimaira, Staind, Godsmack, Soulfly, Trivium, Arch Enemy, and Black Label Society. STEMM also played the last full show of Dimebag Darrell (Pantera/Damageplan) in Buffalo, NY, the night before he was killed on stage in Columbus, Ohio.

STEMM began a hiatus on December 1, 2012. Then, in early 2019, it was announced on the band's Facebook page that they would be releasing new music later in the year.

STEMM was endorsed by ESP Guitars, Jägermeister, Dream Cymbals, Regal Tip drumsticks and Mesa Boogie.

== History ==
=== Early years ===
STEMM was formed in June 1998 by Joe Cafarella, Jimi Penque, Russ Martin and Louis Penque. All the members had come from various other local acts. By December the band recorded a two-song promo disc. Within four months' time, the album had sold well over 600 copies. Initially STEMM incorporated a hybrid of hardcore with rapcore much like the band E.Town Concrete. These sounds were very prominent on their first EP, entitled Further Efforts and also on their first independently released debut, entitled Dead to Me which was released in 2002. In July 2000, STEMM would announce the addition of second guitarist, Rich Spalla.

=== UFC and Fight Network ===
In 2002, STEMM also signed a licensing deal with the UFC. STEMM's music has been incorporated in UFC television and live events since August 2002. Songs to date used by the UFC include, "Out of Context", "Holding On", "Fallen", "Face the Pain" (which was used for the theme song and is featured on the UFC 2009 Undisputed soundtrack), which have been used on every UFC pay-per-view from 2002 until 2018 and The Ultimate Fighter. "Face the Pain" was also featured on the UFC compilation CD UFC Ultimate Beatdowns Volume 1 alongside such bands as Fear Factory, Slayer and Shadows Fall. STEMM more recently also signed a licensing deal to feature their music on Canadian television station The Fight Network.

=== Lineup changes ===
In late 2003 and through most of 2004, the band's lineup would change. Jimi Penque left STEMM, citing creative and musical differences. A few months later Louis Penque left STEMM due to family reasons. This provided the bridge for the merging of local Buffalo metal act, 5 Years Gone and STEMM. 5 Years Gone drummer Dan Nelligan and vocalist T.J. Frost of 5 Years Gone began filling in, while STEMM guitarists returned the favor by replacing the two guitarists that had recently departed 5 Years Gone. After bassist Russ Martin was fired, STEMM and 5 Years Gone would be combined as one. The combination saw the band take a different direction musically. Because of this, the band as a whole do not recognize the previous incarnation of the band and even contemplated changing the name of the band, but decided to keep on as STEMM due in large part to the UFC having already spent money on promoting the band.

=== New beginning ===
After reconfiguring the lineup, STEMM signed to Chimaira guitarist Rob Arnold's management label, Triple M Management. With Arnold's help, the band recorded a 5-song EP entitled 5 in early 2004. On the song "13 Years", Chimaira vocalist Mark Hunter did a guest appearance. The EP went on to sell over 1,000 copies in only a couple of months time. The band did local shows in support of the demo, opening for acts such as Sevendust and touring nationwide with Chimaira and Trivium. STEMM would be the openers for Damageplan's final concert, as the next day, Dimebag Darrell was murdered while onstage. They also opened for Nuclear Blast artist Bleed The Sky at the legendary Whisky a Go Go. T.J. Frost along with Joe Cafarella would provide guest vocals on the Bleed the Sky track "Division" as well. The band then participated in the 2005 installment of the New England Metal and Hardcore Festival with other notable acts such as Soilwork, Danzig, Dark Tranquillity and Mnemic. In November 2005, the band released their second album, entitled Songs for the Incurable Heart independently. The album included four tracks from the previous demo, plus all new material, including a song that is a tribute to the victims of the September 11, 2001 attacks, which vocalist T.J. Frost survived entitled "The Day the Earth Stood Still" which clocks in at 9:11, in homage.

=== Finally signed ===
In August 2006, the band announced on their MySpace page that they had officially signed a record deal with I Scream Records to re-release their second album Songs for the Incurable Heart. Though the contract was only to re-release Songs for the Incurable Heart. STEMM continued for the next year opening for bands such as Godsmack and Stone Sour. On July 30, 2007, STEMM announced that vocalist T.J. Frost had departed the band due to personal issues. With his departure, back up vocalist and guitarist Joe Cafarella changed to full-time vocal duty, while guitarist Alex Scouten formerly of 3 Minutes of Hate began filling in as a session member. Alex had previously worked with STEMM, when then vocalist T.J. Frost was injured in 2006 and also was the original guitar player for STEMM when they reformed with a different lineup in 2003. Later on Scouten replaced former guitarist Rich Spalla.

=== Blood Scent ===
After securing a solid lineup the band began working on new material for their third album Blood Scent. The song "Poopmouth" which was later renamed "Broken Face Masterpiece" for the album was featured in the May edition of Metal Edge Magazine on a CD sampler that accompanied the magazine. In early July it was announced the new album was completed, but it wouldn't be until mid-October before the track listing and artwork for the new album, Blood Scent was confirmed. In the same news, the band also revealed that they had signed with Catch 22 Records, a subsidiary of MVD Entertainment and that they would handle the release of the album. In the words of vocalist Joe Cafarella, the new album is their Vulgar Display of Power. Comparing the album itself not as a clone of the album, but as the way it represents them as a whole, saying "We just wanted to make a CD that would not pigeon hole us into a certain cliché sound. Let's face it, Pantera made it on their live performances. While MTV was playing 'Walk' and 'This Love' us metal heads were cranking Fucking Hostile and Mouth for War." Blood Scent was released on November 11, 2008. In a press release by the UFC, the company stated that the song, "House of Cards" from Blood Scent would be used as the theme song for UFC Wired. The first single, "Awake" is accompanied by a video that was shot by GDM Video Production company.

=== Joining with Trans-Fusion Entertainment ===
In late 2008 STEMM finally found a booking agency who was able to get them outside a regional market. STEMM has been touring the United States in support of Blood Scent as the headlining act.

=== Ride or Die Tour 2009 ===
In June 2009, STEMM announced they would headlining the Ride Or Die Tour with bands His Name Was Yesterday and Adakain.

== Disbandment and reunion ==
On December 1, 2012, STEMM performed their last show. The concert was located at Town Ballroom in Buffalo, NY. They performed with His Name Was Yesterday and Whiskey Reverb. Former members Louis, TJ, and Stephen played with them according to the eras they were with the band (e.g. Louis performed songs from Further Efforts and Dead to Me). They all came together for Face the Pain and finally Monster.

After disbandment, Joe and Danny started working in music publishing for Sonoton and APM.

The band became active again in 2019. They released a new single "Don't Act Surprised" on YouTube on October 13, 2019.

== Band members ==
Current lineup

- Joe Cafarella – vocals, guitar (1998–present, 2019–present)
- Dan Nelligan – drums (2003–2012, 2019–present)
- Alex Scouten – guitar (1998–1999, 2007–2012, 2019–present)
- Joe Scouten – bass, backing vocals (2019–present)

Former members

- Louis Penque III – vocals (1998–2003, guest 2011, 2012, 2022)
- Russ Martin – bass (1998–2003)
- Jimi Penque – drums (1998–2003)
- Fred Blackwell – guitar (1999–2000, guest 2012, 2022)
- T.J. Frost – vocals (2003–2007, guest 2012, 2022)
- Rich Spalla – guitar (2000–2007)
- Stephen Crowl – bass, backing vocals (2003–2011, guest 2012, 2025)
- Mario Nobilio – bass, backing vocals (2011–2012)

== Discography ==
Title	Release date	Label
Further Efforts	1999	None
Dead to Me	2001	None
5	2004	None
Songs for the Incurable Heart	November 15, 2005; October 10, 2006 (re-release)	I Scream Records
Blood Scent	November 11, 2008	Catch 22 Records
Crossroads	September 13, 2011	Catch 22 Records
