= Matt DeVries =

American guitarist

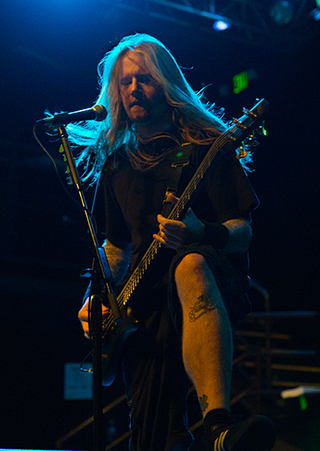
- DeVries performing with Fear Factory in 2013

Background information
- Born: January 28, 1977 (age 48)
- Genres: Groove metal, metalcore, industrial metal, death metal
- Occupation: Musician
- Instrument(s): Guitar, bass guitar
- Years active: 1995–present
- Website: chimaira.com

Matthew DeVries (born January 28, 1977) is an American musician. He is the rhythm guitarist in the metal band Chimaira and the former bassist in Fear Factory. During his time with Chimaira, he, along with lead guitarist Rob Arnold and singer Mark Hunter, wrote many of the band's songs. In 2005, DeVries appeared on the Roadrunner United: The All Star Sessions album, playing on two of the tracks, "Annihilation by the Hands of God" and "Constitution Down".

It was announced in March 2011 that DeVries would be the touring bassist for Six Feet Under along with fellow Chimaira guitarist Rob Arnold and former Chimaira drummer Kevin Talley.

Matt DeVries left Chimaira after Chimaira Christmas '11 for 'personal reasons'.

In February 2012, he joined industrial metal band, Fear Factory, replacing Byron Stroud as bassist. He left the band in May 2015, being replaced by Static-X and Ministry bassist Tony Campos.

In February 2014, he began touring as the bassist for Unearth.

He filled in for John Campbell from Lamb of God on the last 2013 leg of their Resolution Tour, who had to pull out due to a family emergency.

On June 21, 2017, Chimaira announced a one-off reunion show would take place on December 30, 2017. Matt later confirmed this on his social media accounts.

DeVries endorses ESP Guitars, and he plays his LTD MFA-600 signature model. It features an alder Viper body, a maple neck through the body with an ebony fingerboard, a TonePros Tune-O-Matic bridge, locking tuners and one EMG 81 pickup. While playing bass in Unearth and Fear Factory, he would use LTD B-series 5-string bass guitars, and while touring with Six Feet Under he used LTD F-series 4 string basses. He eventually switched to using Ibanez Soundgear 5-string bass guitars in 2013.

== Discography ==
- The Impossibility of Reason (2003), Roadrunner
- The Dehumanizing Process (2004), Roadrunner – DVD
- Chimaira (2005), Roadrunner
- Resurrection (2007), Ferret (U.S.) & Nuclear Blast
- The Infection (2009), Ferret (U.S.) & Nuclear Blast
