= New wave of American heavy metal =

Music movement

- Other names: NWOAHM; New wave of American metal
- Stylistic origins: Alternative metal; groove metal; metalcore; industrial metal; nu metal
- Cultural origins: Early–mid 1990s, United States
- Typical instruments: Vocals; electric guitar; bass guitar; drums

Other topics
- New wave of British heavy metal

The new wave of American heavy metal (also known as NWOAHM and new wave of American metal) was a heavy metal music movement that originated in the United States during the early–mid 1990s and expanded most in the early to mid-2000s. Some of the bands considered part of the movement had formed as early as the late 1980s, but did not become influential or reach popular standing until the following decade. The term itself borrows from the new wave of British heavy metal dating to 1979. NWOAHM includes a wide variety of styles, including alternative metal, groove metal, industrial metal, nu metal and metalcore. The term was reportedly coined by Mark Hunter, vocalist of the American metalcore band Chimaira, in 2001.

Although the term is used by the media with increasing frequency, the definition has not been finished completely. This is due in part to the growing addition of bands that assimilate to common styles in NWOAHM (as defined below), yet have not differentiated greatly enough as to garner a new genre moniker. One description by longtime metal author Garry Sharpe-Young helps classify the NWOAHM as a "marriage of European-style riffing and throaty vocals". Several of the bands within the NWOAHM are credited with bringing heavy metal back into the mainstream.

== History ==
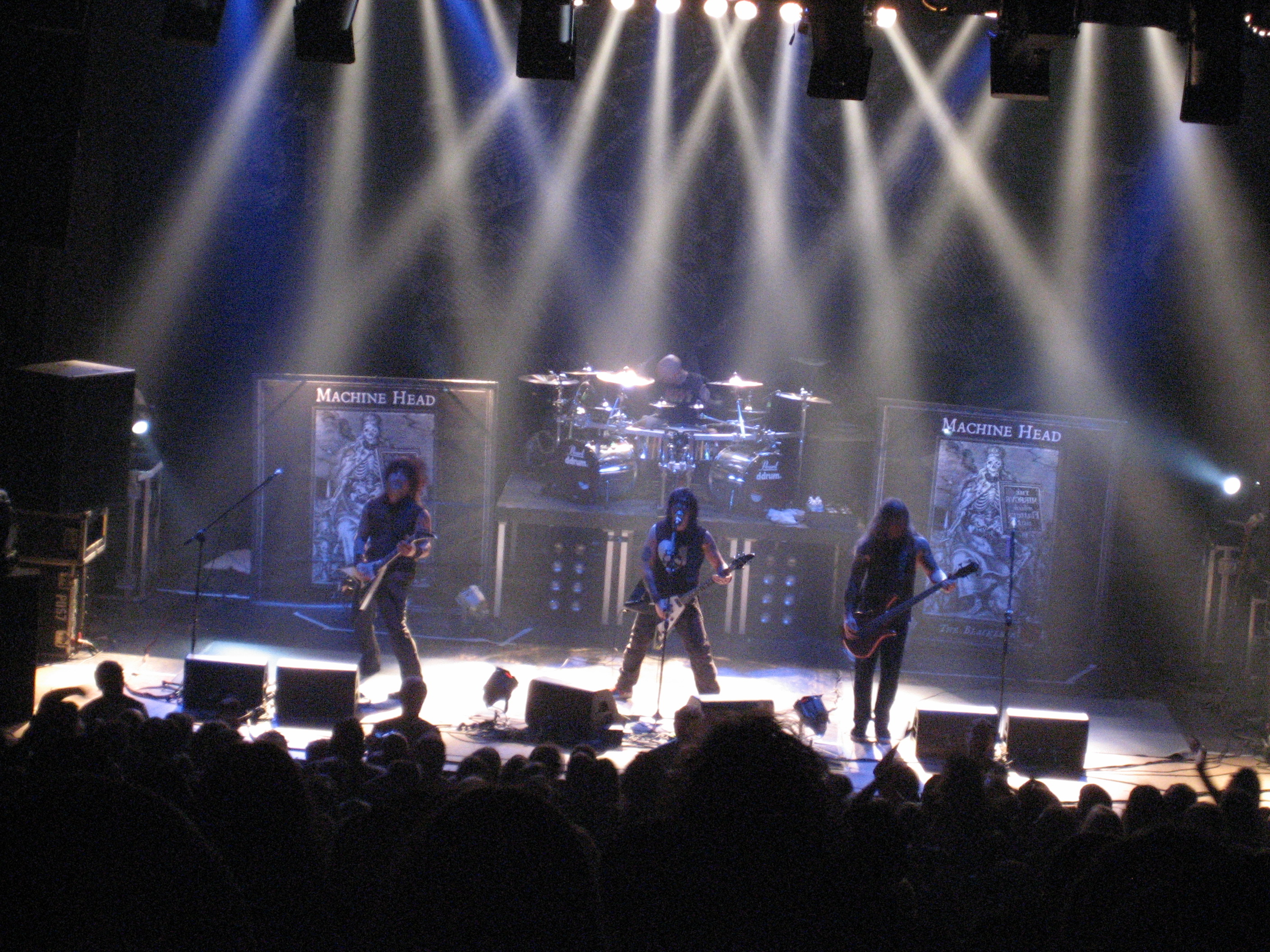
Machine Head performing in 2007

The new wave of American heavy metal has its origins in a group of post-grunge acts from the 1990s that brought heavy metal "back to its core brutality" and drawing not from the traditional blues formula but from thrash metal and punk. In the book The Next Generation of Rock & Punk, Joel McIver acknowledged Korn as the pioneers of the new wave of American heavy metal, and also credits them as the first band labeled as nu metal. The nu metal genre was popular in the late 1990s and early 2000s. Other roots of NWOAHM are attributed to bands such as Pantera, Biohazard, and Machine Head.

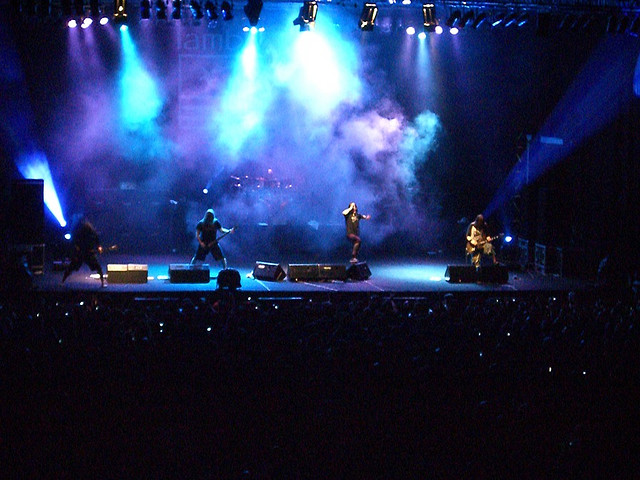
Lamb of God performing in 2009

The producers behind the 2005 documentary Metal: A Headbanger's Journey have written of the NWOAHM: "In essence, NWOAHM can embody the seething aggression of the 'hardcore' hormone, but play a type of acrobatic, precise, technical thrash/death metal synthesis regularly touched by the melody of traditional metal, but often just briefly. Vocally, these bands huddle around Pantera-derived roar, leaning toward a death metal bark, but often with 'clean' or 'sung' vocals as ear candy, sometimes from a member of the band who is not the front man." They also reference Unearth, Shadows Fall, and Lamb of God as "leaders of the pack".

In the book New Wave of American Heavy Metal, when listing the wave's most popular contributors, Garry Sharpe-Young stated: "...the groups that broke the metal scene into new territory after grunge were Pantera, Biohazard, and Machine Head. From there it gets really diverse, crossing the spectrum from melodic death metal to progressive metal and everything in between." Sharpe-Young described bands such as Pantera, Biohazard and Machine Head as neo-metal, writing that the band Pantera started a new time period of heavy metal that involved both Biohazard and Machine Head. Sharpe-Young lists the broad range of styles in the new wave of American heavy metal movement as ranging from the Christian metalcore scene, the 1970s-inspired progressive rock of Coheed and Cambria, melodic death metal, and the screamo and "sub-Gothique" emocore of Alkaline Trio and My Chemical Romance. Beyond this, the genre encompasses a number of different styles including alternative metal, groove metal, hardcore punk and metalcore.
