= Restless in the Tides =

Studio album by Forever in Terror
- Released: June 12, 2007
- Recorded: 2007
- Genres: Metalcore, deathcore
- Length: 54:08
- Label: Metal Blade
- Producer: Don Debiase

Forever in Terror chronology
Restless in the Tides (2007)	The End (2009)

Restless in the Tides is the first studio album by heavy metal music group Forever in Terror.

== Track listing ==
No.	Title	Length
1.	"Destroy Us"	4:20
2.	"Leviathan"	4:43
3.	"In the Face of the Faceless" (feat. Mark Hunter of Chimaira)	6:04
4.	"The Chosen One"	4:05
5.	"Shameless Crucifixion"	7:02
6.	"I'm Not Afraid of Tomorrow"	6:24
7.	"Upon Your Grave"	4:22
8.	"To Burn Alone, To Burn Alive"	4:20
9.	"All Left Drowning"	4:49
10.	"Restless in the Tides"	7:59
Total length:		54:08

== Personnel ==
Forever in Terror

- Chris Bianchi - Vocals
- Johnny Burke - Lead Guitar
- Nate "Nate Dogg" Marti - Rhythm Guitar
- Josh "Jmurda" Owen - Bass
- Nick "NickB" Borukhovsky - Drums

Guest

- Mark Hunter of Chimaira - Vocals on "In the Face of the Faceless"

Production

- Johnny Burke - Producer
- Don Debiase - Producer
