= Chimaira (album) =

Studio album by Chimaira
- Released: August 9, 2005
- Recorded: 2004–2005
- Genres: Groove metal, metalcore
- Length: 59:08
- Label: Roadrunner
- Producers: Ben Schigel, Mark Hunter

Chimaira chronology
| The Impossibility of Reason (2003) | Chimaira (2005) | Resurrection (2007) |

Singles from Chimaira
- 1. "Nothing Remains" Released: 2005; 2. "Save Ourselves" Released: 2005

Professional ratings
Review scores
| Source | Rating |
|---|---|
| AllMusic | 3.5/5 stars |
| Blabbermouth.net | 7.5/10 |
| Drowned in Sound | 9/10 |
| Kerrang! | 4/5 stars |
| laut.de | 4/5 stars |
| Metal.de | 8/10 |
| Metal Rules | 4.0/5 |
| Ox-Fanzine | 6/10 |
| RTÉ | 2/5 stars |
| Terrorizer | 8.5/10 |

Chimaira is the third studio album by American metal band Chimaira, released on August 9, 2005. It debuted No. 74 on the Billboard 200 charts and sold 14,000 copies in the United States in its first week of release (according to Nielsen SoundScan). The album would be the band's final release under Roadrunner Records and the only one to feature Kevin Talley on drums.

== Production ==
Chimaira would mark further progression in heaviness. Band member Chris Spicuzza described the album as "the next natural step from Impossibility of Reason . . . definitely more brutal." He noted its deemphasise on melodic tracks, alluding to the 2003 song "Down Again", and described the writing process as having "zero limitations".

All lyrics were written by vocalist Mark Hunter. The opening track "Nothing Remains" was written on the day that Dimebag Darrell was shot, but was not written specifically about his death.

== Track listing ==
All tracks are written by Rob Arnold and Mark Hunter, except where noted.

| No. | Title | Length |
|---|---|---|
| 1. | "Nothing Remains" | 5:36 |
| 2. | "Save Ourselves" | 5:08 |
| 3. | "Inside the Horror" (Arnold, Hunter, Matt Devries) | 5:29 |
| 4. | "Salvation" (Hunter, Devries) | 5:22 |
| 5. | "Comatose" (Arnold, Hunter, Devries) | 4:44 |
| 6. | "Left for Dead" | 5:43 |
| 7. | "Everything You Love" | 6:17 |
| 8. | "Bloodlust" | 7:18 |
| 9. | "Pray for All" | 5:52 |
| 10. | "Lazarus" (Hunter) | 7:36 |
| Total length: | | 59:08 |

The album was re-issued in 2006 with a bonus disc containing nine additional tracks. All live tracks are from The Dehumanizing Process DVD. The tracks "Clayden" and "Malignant" are covers of Ascension songs. Ascension was a band that former Chimaira members Jason Hagar and Matt DeVries were in before they joined Chimaira.

2006 Bonus Disc
| No. | Title | Length |
|---|---|---|
| 1. | "Clayden" (Ascension cover) | 6:22 |
| 2. | "Malignant" (Ascension cover) | 3:30 |
| 3. | "Power Trip" (Live) | 4:06 |
| 4. | "Cleansation" (Live) | 3:48 |
| 5. | "Severed" (Live) | 3:50 |
| 6. | "Eyes of a Criminal" (Live) | 5:23 |
| 7. | "Down Again" (Live) | 5:27 |
| 8. | "The Dehumanizing Process" (Live) | 3:54 |
| 9. | "Pure Hatred" (Live) | 4:32 |
| Total length: | | 39:32 |

2009 Digital Special Edition
| No. | Title | Length |
|---|---|---|
| 1. | "Nothing Remains" | 5:36 |
| 2. | "Save Ourselves" | 5:08 |
| 3. | "Inside the Horror" | 5:29 |
| 4. | "Salvation" | 5:22 |
| 5. | "Comatose" | 4:44 |
| 6. | "Left for Dead" | 5:43 |
| 7. | "Everything You Love" | 6:17 |
| 8. | "Bloodlust" | 7:18 |
| 9. | "Pray for All" | 5:55 |
| 10. | "Lazarus" | 7:36 |
| 11. | "Disposable Heroes" (Metallica cover) | 8:19 |
| 12. | "Threnody" | 4:04 |
| 13. | "Clayden" (Ascension cover) | 6:22 |
| 14. | "Malignant" (Ascension cover) | 3:30 |
| Total length: | | 81:23 |

== Personnel ==
Chimaira

- Rob Arnold – lead guitar
- Matt DeVries – rhythm guitar
- Mark Hunter – vocals
- Jim LaMarca – bass guitar
- Chris Spicuzza – synthesizers, sampling
- Kevin Talley – drums

Additional musicians

- Andols Herrick – live drums (2006 Bonus Disc, Tracks 3–9), tracked drums (2009 Digital Special Edition, Track 11)

Production

- Produced by Ben Schigel and Mark Hunter at Spider Studios
- Mixed by Ben Schigel and Colin Richardson
- Engineered by Ben Schigel, Tony Gammalo and Tom Kubik
- Mastered by Ted Jensen at Sterling Sound
- Artwork, design, photography and art direction by Garrett Zunt
- Additional photography by Todd Bell
