= The End (Forever in Terror album) =

Studio album by Forever in Terror
- Released: May 19, 2009
- Recorded: 2009
- Genres: Metalcore; Deathcore; Progressive metal
- Length: 35:32
- Label: Independent

Forever in Terror chronology
Restless in the Tides (2007)	The End (2009)

The End is the first independent album by heavy metal music group Forever in Terror. The album shows a more progressive sound and is the first album to feature Chad Lundgren and the only album to feature Ben Kantura and Mike Wartko.

== Track listing ==
No.	Title	Length
1.	"Sunlight Sands"	2:54
2.	"Overboard"	5:38
3.	"Lunar Fortress" (feat. Joey Nelson of Beneath the Sky)	3:12
4.	"V2009"	3:12
5.	"Fallacy of A Memory"	3:33
6.	"Until Valor"	3:10
7.	"Defiled Within"	2:54
8.	"Vertical Horizon"	3:29
9.	"Finite Infinite"	3:45
10.	"Lazarus Mirror"	3:58
Total length:		35:32

== Personnel ==
Forever in Terror

- Chris Bianchi - Vocals
- Glenn Moore - Lead guitar
- Ben Kantura - Rhythm guitar
- Chad Lundgren - Bass guitar
- Mike Wartko - Keyboards
- Nick Borukhovsky - Drums

Guest

- Joey Nelson of Beneath the Sky - Vocals on "Lunar Fortress"
