= This Present Darkness (EP) =

EP by Chimaira
- Released: January 11, 2000
- Recorded: November 1–3, 1999
- Studios: Spider Studios, Strongsville, Ohio
- Genres: Nu metal, metalcore
- Length: 34:28
- Label: East Coast Empire
- Producers: Ben Schigel, Chimaira

Chimaira chronology
Chimaira EP (1999)	This Present Darkness (2000)	Pass Out of Existence (2001)

Professional ratings
Review scores
Source	Rating
AllMusic	4/5 stars

This Present Darkness is the debut EP and first major release of the American heavy metal band Chimaira. As of 2007, the EP has sold more than 10,000 copies, and it paved the way for the group’s first full-length album, Pass Out of Existence, which would see a release the following year. Two songs from this EP, "Painting the White to Grey" and "Sphere", were re-recorded for Pass Out of Existence.

== Background ==
The hidden tracks, "Empty" and "Silence", were recorded with original bassist Andrew Ermlick. The band wanted the songs to be part of the EP, and they also wanted Ermlick to be part of the record. However, they did not have the money to bring him in to re-record them so they used the demo versions of the tracks. The two tracks were hidden so that the CD could be sold at the price of an EP.

"Empty" features guest vocals from Rob of the band Canister.

"Silence" features guest vocals from John Marino, Doug Esper, and Dan Pelleteir.

The sample at the end of "Sphere" is taken from the film The Shawshank Redemption, a favorite of the band members'. The sample is removed from the re-released edition.

"Satan's Wizard" is not a live track; crowd noise was added to the recording, and the high pitched vocals are done by Ben Schigel of Sw1tched (the producer of this EP). At the end of the song, he deliberately mispronounces the word 'Chimaira'.

=== 2004 reissue ===
This Present Darkness was re-released and remastered with two included bonus tracks, "Refuse to See" and "Gag" (yet with "Satan's Wizard" omitted). This reissue came as a bonus item with the Dehumanizing Process DVD released on October 26, 2004. The bonus song "Refuse to See" that was included in this version is the same track that was included on the band's 1999 MCD self-titled EP; however, "Gag" is exclusive to this version only and was never released on any previous Chimaira album. "Gag" and "Refuse to See" were actually written while Hunter and Jim LaMarca were playing in Skipline, their prior hardcore band.

== Cover art ==
The person who appears on the front cover is a heavily edited photo of drummer Andols Herrick.

== Track listing ==
All tracks are written by Chimaira.

Original release
No.	Title	Length
1.	"This Present Darkness"	5:17
2.	"Painting the White to Grey"	4:32
3.	"Divination"	3:54
4.	"Sphere"	4:05
5.	"Lend a Hand"	4:47
13.	"Empty" (hidden track)	6:23
14.	"Silence" (hidden track)	3:23
69.	"Satan's Wizard" (hidden track)	2:07
Total length:		34:28

2004 re-release (Dehumanizing Process bonus disc)
No.	Title	Length
1.	"This Present Darkness"	5:17
2.	"Painting the White to Grey"	4:32
3.	"Divination"	3:54
4.	"Sphere"	3:15
5.	"Lend a Hand"	4:47
6.	"Empty" (bonus)	6:23
7.	"Silence" (bonus)	3:23
8.	"Gag" (bonus)	4:30
9.	"Refuse to See" (bonus)	3:29
Total length:		39:30

== Personnel ==
- Mark Hunter – vocals
- Rob Arnold – guitar
- Jason Hager – guitar
- Andols Herrick – drums
- Rob Lesniak – bass on all songs, sans bonus tracks
- Andrew Ermlick – bass on bonus tracks
