= Blood Scent =

Studio album by STEMM
- Released: November 11, 2008
- Recorded: DWS Studios in Niagara Falls, New York
- Genre: Metalcore, groove metal
- Length: 56:06
- Label: Catch 22
- Producer: Mike Hatalak

STEMM chronology
Songs for the Incurable Heart (2005)	Blood Scent (2008)	Crossroads (2011)

Blood Scent is STEMM's fourth full-length album and first on new record label Catch 22 Records. It was released on November 11, 2008, almost exactly three years since their prior release, which was on November 15, 2005. The album is the first to feature the band's new line-up with original member Alex Scouten taking over guitar duties while former guitarist Joe Cafarella handles full-time vocals for the first time. The first single from the album has been announced as "Awake," the song also has an accompanying video that was produced by GDM Video Production company. The first 1,000 albums sold will also feature a DVD, STEMM's first ever, that will document several aspects of the band and the recording process for Blood Scent. During a recent interview, vocalist Joe Cafarella talked at length about the new album, saying

This new STEMM CD is our 'Vulgar Display of Power.' There is a lot that went into the making of this CD, We are not saying that we are the next Pantera — that's not even close to what I am saying. We just wanted to make a CD that would not pigeon hole us into a certain cliché sound. Let's face it, Pantera made it on their live performances. While MTV was playing 'Walk' and 'This Love', us metalheads were cranking 'Fucking Hostile' and 'Mouth for War'. I am telling you that you will get that same type of feeling on the new STEMM CD as you would listening to 'Vulgar'. And it's just as real.

The band was sending their second single "House of Cards" to rock radio on August 10, 2009. "House of Cards" would later be featured in EA Sports MMA. This was also the last album to feature bassist Stephen Crowl since his first STEMM album was Songs for the Incurable Heart. He was replaced by Mario Nobilio in 2011 who appears in STEMM's final album Crossroads.

Professional ratings
Review scores
Source	Rating
Allmusic	3/5 stars

== Track listing ==
1. "Blood Soaked" - 5:21
2. "House of Cards" - 4:49
3. "One King Down" - 3:52
4. "Awake" - 3:47
5. "The Devil Walks Among Us..." 4:30
6. "Broken Face Masterpiece" - 3:22
7. "As Real As it Gets" - 5:02
8. "Wish" (N.I.N. Cover) - 5:00
9. "Beneath My Skin" 4:51
10. "Never Will I Break" 3:28
11. "Casualty for Prayer" - 12:04

=== Personnel ===
- Joe Cafarella - vocals, guitar
- Stephen Crowl II - bass, backing vocalist
- Alex Scouten - guitar, backing vocals
- Dan Nelligan - drums

=== Guest musicians ===
- Mike Hatalak - Guitar on "Blood Soaked"
- Bruce Wojick - Slide guitar on "House of Cards"
- Judah Nero - Harmonies on "Beneath My Skin"
- T.J. Frost - Ending vocals on "Casualty for Prayer"
- Ruth Ann Davis - Samples on "Wish"
