= Songs for the Incurable Heart =

Studio album by STEMM
- Released: November 15, 2005
- Recorded: Spider Studios, Strongsville, Ohio
- Genres: Metalcore, groove metal
- Length: 52:48
- Label: I Scream
- Producer: Ben Schigel

STEMM chronology
5 (2004)	Songs for the Incurable Heart (2005)	Blood Scent (2008)

Songs for the Incurable Heart is STEMM's second full-length album originally released November 15, 2005. It was re-released on October 10, 2006 by major record label I Scream Records, who signed STEMM in 2006. The song "The Day the Earth Stood Still" is a tribute song to the victims of the September 11, 2001 attacks in which vocalist T.J. Frost was a survivor. The opening track, "The Memory Remains" is also a tribute song to former Pantera/Damageplan guitarist Darrell "Dimebag" Abbott. This is the only album to feature former vocalist T.J. Frost and the last album to feature guitarist Rich Spalla who both left the band in 2007. The album sold over 6,000 copies.

== Track listing ==
1. "The Memory Remains" - 3:23
2. "A Song for the Incurable Heart" - 3:19
3. "Till I Die" - 4:02
4. "Monster" - 3:52
5. "Pandemic" - 4:10
6. "Numb" - 5:30
7. "On the Surface" - 4:11
8. "13 Years" - 3:30
9. "Incomplete" - 3:36
10. "Holding On" - 4:18
11. "Between Now and Forever" - 3:47
12. "The Day the Earth Stood Still" - 9:11

== Album credits ==
- Tony Gammalo - engineer
- Mike Hatalak - producer
- Fred Betschen - mastering
- Mark Hunter - guest vocals on "13 Years"
