= The Impossibility of Reason =

Studio album by Chimaira
- Released: May 13, 2003
- Recorded: 2002–2003
- Studio: Spider Studios in Strongsville, Ohio
- Genres: Groove metal; metalcore; nu metal
- Length: 59:02
- Label: Roadrunner
- Producer: Ben Schigel

Chimaira chronology
Pass Out of Existence (2001)	The Impossibility of Reason (2003)	Chimaira (2005)

Special edition
- Special edition cover

Singles from The Impossibility of Reason
- 1. "Down Again" Released: 2003; 2. "The Impossibility of Reason" Released: 2003; 3. "Eyes of a Criminal" Released: 2005

Professional ratings
Review scores
Source	Rating
AllMusic	3/5 stars
Kerrang!	4/5 stars
Metal Hammer	8/10

The Impossibility of Reason is the second studio album by the American heavy metal band Chimaira, released on May 13, 2003. It is the first album to feature Matt DeVries on rhythm guitar. The album is noted for its groove metal-oriented sound, especially when compared to the band's previous releases which were considered closer to the nu metal genre. Upon release, it debuted No. 117 on the Billboard 200 charts. To date the album has sold around 200,000 copies in the US.

A limited-edition version of The Impossibility of Reason was released in 2004, which included a bonus disc called Reasoning the Impossible. The song "Army of Me" appeared on the Freddy vs. Jason soundtrack.

== Production ==
The Impossibility of Reason was recorded with six-string guitars in drop C tuning, a standard that future albums would follow, and deemphasizes electronic effects. Rob Arnold later explained that the higher tuning allows "much more clarity and power to the attack" in comparison to the murky drop A tuning used on Pass Out of Existence. Thus, the album has been considered heavier than Chimaira's 2001 debut, yet still bears a melodic side. Vocalist Mark Hunter noted the album's musical growth and credited the influence of bands they toured with. He also elaborated that while the sampling featured in their previous album was "ear candy", it would be more focused to "enhance the music" on their 2003 effort. Chimaira would continue their progression of heaviness with future albums.

In an interview, Hunter described The Impossibility of Reason and compared it with the band's prior release:

"With the new album we give the listener a feeling like they can’t breathe, the songs pound you continuous. The breakdowns in the songs don’t go all soft, but stay on the heavy level."

The production of The Impossibility of Reason was filmed and would be included on the Dehumanizing Process DVD in October 2004.

== Touring and promotion ==
Chimaira toured with the likes of In Flames, Soilwork, and Unearth before joining Ozzfest 2003. They also performed on European Road Rage 2003 with Spineshank and Ill Niño before heading to Japan and Australia, the latter being firsts for Chimaira.

In early 2003, a music video was filmed for the melodic "Down Again" which aired on Uranium. By autumn that same year, a video for "Pure Hatred" debuted and gained substantial airplay on Headbangers Ball. With its intense, anthemic chorus, the song became a concert favorite with significant crowd participation. On November 16, 2004, "Pure Hatred" was also featured in the MythBusters episode "Exploding House" during the "talking to plants" segment.

== Track listing ==
No.	Title	Writer(s)	Length
1.	"Cleansation"	Arnold, DeVries, Hunter	4:09
2.	"The Impossibility of Reason"	Arnold, Hunter	3:42
3.	"Pictures in the Gold Room"	Arnold, Hunter	4:26
4.	"Power Trip"	Hunter	2:47
5.	"Down Again"	Hunter	4:20
6.	"Pure Hatred"	Arnold, DeVries, Hunter	4:18
7.	"The Dehumanizing Process"	DeVries, Hunter, Arnold	4:10
8.	"Crawl"	Arnold, Hunter	3:30
9.	"Stigmurder"	Arnold, Hunter	4:38
10.	"Eyes of a Criminal"	Arnold, Hunter	5:15
11.	"Overlooked"	Arnold, Hunter	4:10
12.	"Implements of Destruction"	Arnold, Hunter	13:30
Total length:			59:02

UK bonus track
No.	Title	Length
13.	"Army of Me" (Demo)	4:21
Total length:		63:30

Reasoning the Impossible
No.	Title	Length
1.	"Indifferent to Suffering"	4:22
2.	"Stays the Same" (Quoted as "Removed Track" from Reasoning the Impossible version)	3:07
3.	"Without Moral Restraint"	4:02
4.	"Fascination Street" (The Cure cover)	4:52
5.	"Let Go" (Demo)	4:21
6.	"Pass Out of Existence" (Demo)	3:47
7.	"Severed" (Demo)	2:59
8.	"Forced Life" (Demo)	4:33
9.	"Dead Inside" (Demo)	3:41
10.	"Power Trip" (Live)	2:57
11.	"Cleansation" (Live)	3:43
Total length:		40:24

=== Notes ===
- Tracks 1–2 taken from the pre-production sessions for The Impossibility of Reason (November 2002)
  - Produced and mixed by Ben Schigel
  - Co-produced by Mark Hunter and Rob Arnold
- Tracks 3–4 are out-takes from the Pass Out of Existence album sessions (April 2001)
  - Track 4 was recorded as part of a tribute cover album for The Cure
  - Produced and mixed by Andrew Murdock
- Tracks 5–9 taken from various pre-production sessions for Pass Out of Existence (March 2000–February 2001)
  - Produced and mixed by Ben Schigel
- Tracks 10–11 recorded live off the board at The Glass House, Pomona, California (December 7, 2003)
  - (Un)mixed by Tom Kubik

== Personnel ==
Chimaira

- Mark Hunter – vocals, guitar on "Implements of Destruction"
- Rob Arnold – lead guitar
- Andols Herrick – drums
- Matt DeVries – lead and rhythm guitar
- Chris Spicuzza – keyboards, electronics
- Jim LaMarca – bass guitar

Additional musicians

- Jason Hager – rhythm guitar (Reasoning the Impossible, tracks 3–9)
- Ricky Evensend – live drums (Reasoning the Impossible, tracks 10–11)

Production

- Ben Schigel – producer, engineer
- Mark Hunter – producer
- Rob Arnold – producer
- Colin Richardson – mixing
- Ted Jensen – mastering at Sterling Sound
- Garrett Zunt – artwork
