= Roadrunner United =

2005 project by Roadrunner Records

A promotional shot of the four 'team captains'. From left to right: Robb Flynn, Matt Heafy, Joey Jordison (wearing his Slipknot mask), and Dino Cazares.

Roadrunner United was a project organized by American heavy metal record label Roadrunner Records to celebrate its 25th anniversary. It culminated in an album released worldwide on October 11, 2005, entitled The All-Star Sessions. Four "team captains" were chosen to lead 57 artists from 45 past and present Roadrunner bands, and produce and oversee the album's 18 tracks: then-Slipknot drummer Joey Jordison, Trivium frontman and guitarist Matt Heafy, Fear Factory guitarist Dino Cazares, and Machine Head frontman and guitarist Robb Flynn. The project was the brainchild of Roadrunner UK general manager Mark Palmer and Roadrunner USA VP of A&R Monte Conner. The album project was coordinated by Lora Richardson and was mixed by Colin Richardson and Andy Sneap. The All-Star Sessions spawned one single and music video ("The End"). The DVD included with the CD purchase is a documentary of the "Making Of" the songs. It features the sessions of the four team captains making their songs.

On October 13, 2008, Roadrunner Records announced that a two-disc DVD of a release party-concert, featuring songs from the album performed live, would be released on December 9, 2008. The DVD features the full concert and a documentary.

The project design was inspired by association football, particularly the three European football clubs; Manchester United, the primary inspiration behind the project's name and most part of the logo, Real Madrid (the logo's crown), and AC Milan (red and black stripes in the background).

== The All-Star Sessions ==
The All-Star Sessions

Studio album by Roadrunner United
- Released: October 11, 2005
- Recorded: February 16 – June 1, 2005
- Genre: Heavy metal
- Length: 76:55
- Label: Roadrunner
- Producer: Joey Jordison; Matt Heafy; Dino Cazares; Robb Flynn

Professional ratings
Review scores
Source	Rating
Stylus Magazine	B+
Pyro Music	8.5/10 stars

=== Track listing ===
No.	Title	Lyrics	Music	Performed by	Length
1.	"The Dagger"	Robb Flynn, Howard Jones	Flynn	Performed by: (C) Robb Flynn – rhythm guitar, vocals; Howard Jones – vocals; Jeff Waters – guitar solo; Jordan Whelan – rhythm guitar; Christian Olde Wolbers – bass guitar; Andols Herrick – drums	5:31
2.	"The Enemy"	Mark Hunter	Dino Cazares, Roy Mayorga	Performed by: (C) Dino Cazares – rhythm guitar; Mark Hunter – vocals; Andreas Kisser – guitar solo; Paul Gray – bass guitar; Roy Mayorga – drums	4:44
3.	"Annihilation by the Hands of God"	Glen Benton	Joey Jordison, Rob Barrett	Performed by: (C) Joey Jordison – drums; Glen Benton – vocals; James Murphy – guitar solo; Rob Barrett – rhythm guitar; Matt DeVries – rhythm guitar; Steve Di Giorgio – bass guitar	5:33
4.	"In the Fire"	King Diamond	Matt Heafy	Performed by: (C) Matt Heafy – lead, rhythm & acoustic guitars; King Diamond – vocals; Corey Beaulieu – lead & rhythm guitars; Mike D'Antonio – bass guitar; Dave Chavarri – drums	4:07
5.	"The End"	Matt Heafy	Cazares	Performed by: (C) Dino Cazares – rhythm guitar; Matt Heafy – vocals, guitar solo; Logan Mader – guitar (harmonics); Rhys Fulber – keyboards; Nadja Peulen – bass guitar; Roy Mayorga – drums	3:35
6.	"Tired 'n Lonely"	Keith Caputo	Jordison	Performed by: (C) Joey Jordison – bass guitar, drums; Keith Caputo – vocals; Jim Root – solo/harmony guitar; Acey Slade – rhythm guitar; Tom Niemeyer – rhythm guitar; Matt Baumbach – rhythm guitar	3:37
7.	"Independent (Voice of the Voiceless)"	Max Cavalera	Flynn, Phil Demmel	Performed by: (C) Robb Flynn – rhythm guitar, 3-part guitar harmony, keyboards; Max Cavalera – vocals; Jeff Waters – guitar solo; Jordan Whelan – rhythm guitar; Christian Olde Wolbers – bass guitar; Andols Herrick – drums	4:51
8.	"Dawn of a Golden Age"	Dani Filth	Heafy	Performed by: (C) Matt Heafy – lead & rhythm guitars; Dani Filth – vocals; Justin Hagberg – guitar; Sean Malone – bass guitar; Mike Smith – drums	4:09
9.	"The Rich Man"	Corey Taylor	Flynn	Performed by: (C) Robb Flynn – rhythm guitar, keyboards; Corey Taylor – vocals; Jordan Whelan – rhythm guitar; Christian Olde Wolbers – bass guitar; Andols Herrick – drums	6:49
10.	"No Way Out"	Daryl Palumbo	Jordison, Matt Sepanic	Performed by: (C) Joey Jordison – bass guitar, drums; Daryl Palumbo – vocals; Matt Baumbach – lead & rhythm guitars; Junkie XL – keyboards	3:27
11.	"Baptized in the Redemption"	Dez Fafara	Cazares, Mayorga	Performed by: (C) Dino Cazares – rhythm guitar; Dez Fafara – vocals; Andreas Kisser – guitar solo; Paul Gray – bass guitar; Roy Mayorga – drums	3:19
12.	"Roads"	Mikael Åkerfeldt	Josh Silver	Performed by: Mikael Åkerfeldt – vocals; Josh Silver – keyboards, vocals	2:24
13.	"Blood & Flames"	Jesse Leach	Heafy	Performed by: (C) Matt Heafy – lead, rhythm & acoustic guitars, vocals; Jesse Leach – vocals; Josh Rand – rhythm guitar; Mike D'Antonio – bass guitar; Johnny Kelly – drums	5:38
14.	"Constitution Down"	Kyle Thomas	Jordison	Performed by: (C) Joey Jordison – drums; Kyle Thomas – vocals; James Murphy – guitar solo (intro); Andy LaRocque – guitar solo; Rob Barrett – rhythm guitar, guitar solo; Matt DeVries – rhythm guitar; Steve Di Giorgio – bass guitar	5:04
15.	"I Don't Wanna Be (A Superhero)"	Michale Graves	Heafy	Performed by: (C) Matt Heafy – lead & rhythm guitars; Michale Graves – vocals; Justin Hagberg – rhythm guitar; Mike D'Antonio – bass guitar; Dave Chavarri – drums	2:02
16.	"Army of the Sun"	Tim Williams	Flynn, Dave McClain	Performed by: (C) Robb Flynn – rhythm guitar; Tim Williams – vocals; Jordan Whelan – rhythm guitar; Christian Olde Wolbers – bass guitar; Andols Herrick – drums	3:48
17.	"No Más Control"	Cristian Machado	Cazares, John Sankey	Performed by: (C) Dino Cazares – rhythm guitar; Cristian Machado – vocals; Andreas Kisser – harmony solo; Mike Sarkisyan – harmony guitar; Cello Dias – bass guitar; Dave McClain – drums	3:01
18.	"Enemy of the State"	Peter Steele	Jordison, Sepanic	Performed by: (C) Joey Jordison – drums; Peter Steele – vocals, keyboards; Steve Holt – lead, rhythm & slide guitars; Josh Silver – keyboards; Dave Pybus – bass guitar	5:08
Total length:					76:55

(C) – Denotes the captain for the song.

== Personnel ==
=== Team Captains ===
The following were the primary songwriters/producers for the album and were referred to as the 'Team Captains', each getting to select the musicians they wanted for each song.

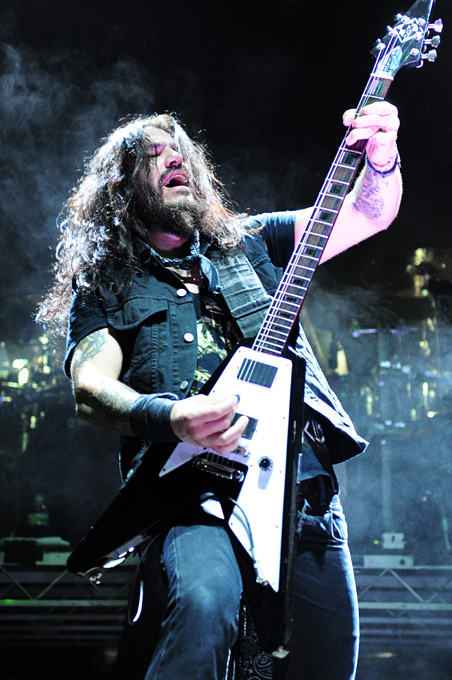
- Robb Flynn, guitarist and vocalist for Machine Head
  Robb Flynn – co-lead vocals (track 1), keyboards (tracks 7, 9), rhythm guitar, production (1, 7, 9, 16)
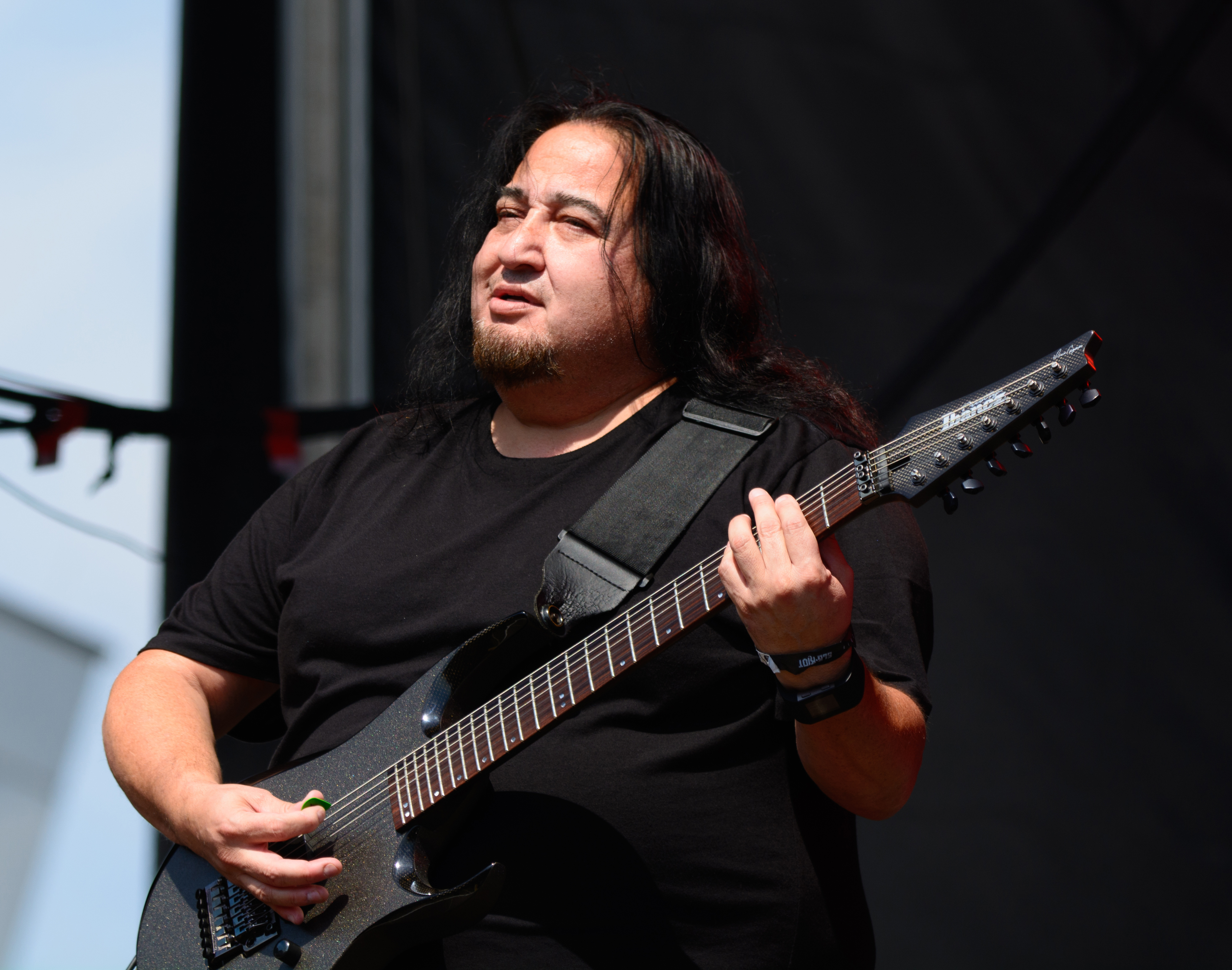
- Dino Cazares, guitarist for Fear Factory
  Dino Cazares – rhythm guitar, production (tracks 2, 5, 11, 17)
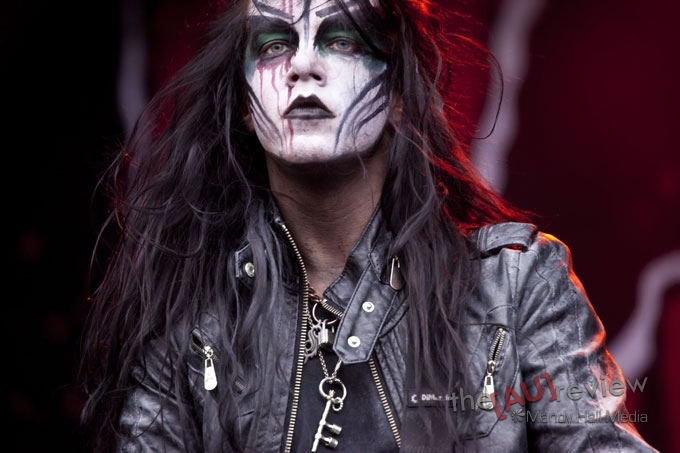
- Joey Jordison, former drummer of Slipknot
  Joey Jordison – bass (tracks 6, 10), drums, production (tracks 3, 6, 10, 14, 18)
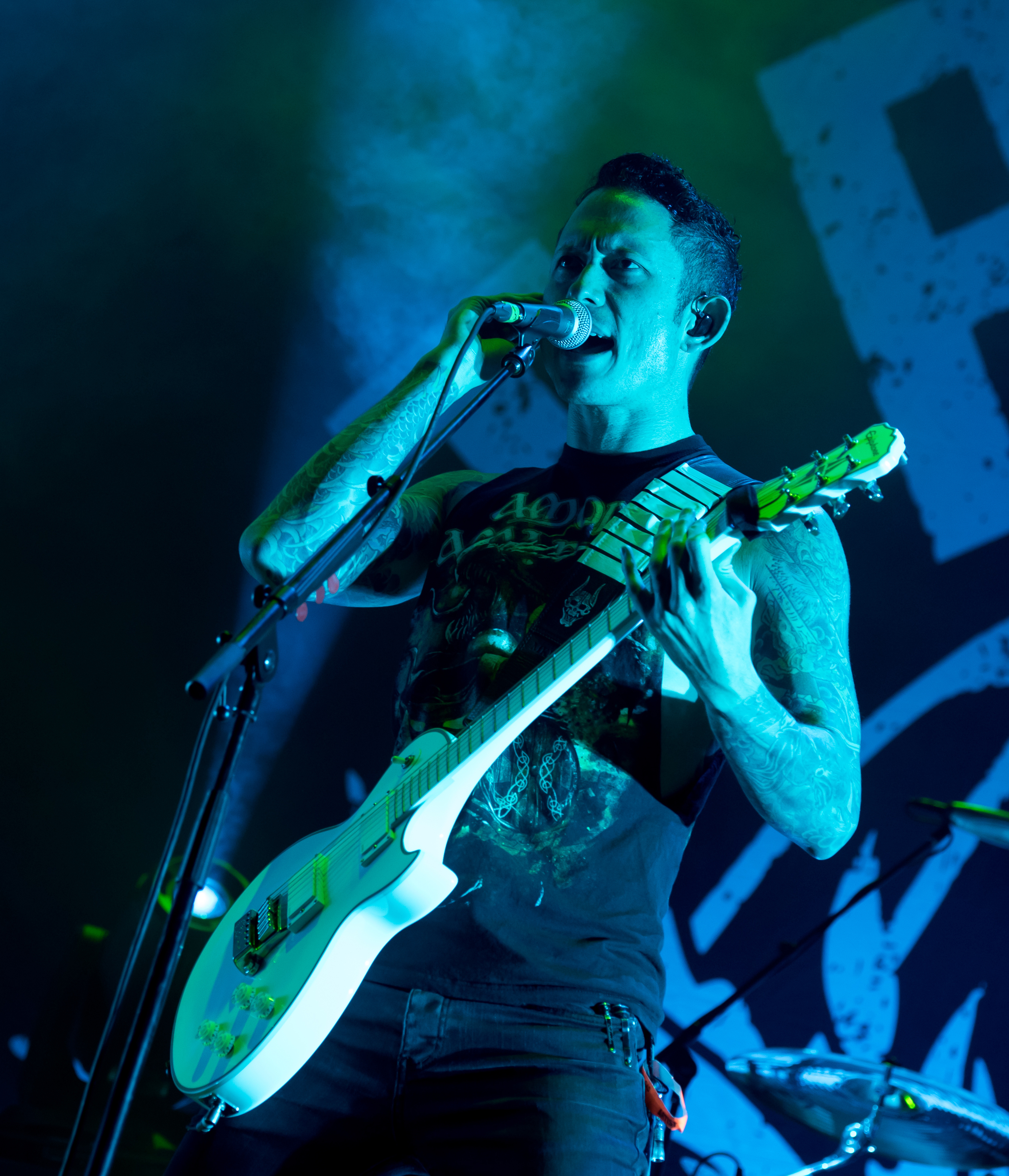
  Matt Heafy, vocalist and guitarist for Trivium
- Matt Heafy – lead vocals (track 5), backing vocals (tracks 8, 13), acoustic guitar (tracks 4, 13), lead and rhythm guitar, production (tracks 4, 8, 13, 15)

=== Vocalists ===
- Howard Jones – (co-lead) (track 1)
- Mark Hunter (track 2)
- Glen Benton (track 3)
- King Diamond (track 4)¨
- Matt Heafy (track 5)
- Keith Caputo (track 6)
- Max Cavalera (track 7)
- Dani Filth (track 8)
- Corey Taylor (track 9)
- Daryl Palumbo (track 10)
- Dez Fafara (track 11)
- Mikael Åkerfeldt (track 12)
- Jesse Leach (track 13)
- Kyle Thomas (track 14)
- Michale Graves (track 15)
- Tim Williams (track 16)
- Cristian Machado (track 17)
- Peter Steele (track 18)

=== Guitarists ===
- Jordan Whelan – rhythm (tracks 1, 7, 9, 16)
- Jeff Waters – lead (tracks 1, 7)
- Andreas Kisser – lead (tracks 2, 11) co-lead (track 17)
- Matt DeVries – rhythm (tracks 3, 14)
- Rob Barrett – rhythm (tracks 3, 14), co-lead (track 14)
- James Murphy – lead (track 3), intro lead (track 14)
- Corey Beaulieu – rhythm & lead (track 4)
- Logan Mader – harmonics (track 5)
- Matt Baumbach – rhythm (tracks 6, 10), lead (track 10)
- Tom Niemeyer – rhythm (track 6)
- Acey Slade – rhythm (track 6)
- Jim Root – lead (track 6)
- Justin Hagberg – rhythm (tracks 8, 15)
- Josh Rand – rhythm (track 13)
- Andy LaRocque – co-lead (track 14)
- Mike Sarkisyan – co-lead (track 17)
- Steve Holt – rhythm & acoustic (track 18)

=== Bassists ===
- Christian Olde Wolbers (tracks 1, 7, 9, 16)
- Paul Gray (tracks 2, 11)
- Steve Di Giorgio (tracks 3, 14)
- Mike D'Antonio (tracks 4, 13, 15)
- Nadja Peulen (track 5)
- Sean Malone (track 8)
- Marcelo Dias (track 17)
- Dave Pybus (track 18)

=== Drummers ===
- Andols Herrick (tracks 1, 7, 9, 16)
- Joey Jordison (tracks 3, 6, 10, 14)
- Roy Mayorga (tracks 2, 5, 11)
- Dave Chavarri (tracks 4, 15)
- Mike Smith (track 8)
- Johnny Kelly (track 13)
- Dave McClain (track 17)

=== Keyboards/Programming ===
- Rhys Fulber (track 5)
- Junkie XL (track 10)
- Josh Silver (tracks 12, 18), backing vocals (track 12)
- Peter Steele (track 18)

=== Engineers ===
- Matt Sepanic (tracks 3, 6, 10, 14, 18)
- Jason Suecof (tracks (4, 8, 13, 15)
- Roy Mayorga (tracks 2, 5, 11, 17)
- Mark Keaton (tracks 1, 7, 9, 16)

=== Charts ===
Chart performance for The All-Star Sessions
Chart (2005)	Peak position
Australian Albums (ARIA)	45
Dutch Albums (Album Top 100)	92
French Albums (SNEP)	114
German Albums (Offizielle Top 100)	67
Italian Albums (FIMI)	82
UK Albums Chart	45
US Billboard 200	77

== Roadrunner United: The Concert ==
The Concert

Live album by Roadrunner United
- Released: 2008
- Recorded: December 15, 2005
- Genre: Heavy metal
- Length: 1:57:39
- Label: Roadrunner
- Producer: Harlan Frey

A concert celebrating the project, album and anniversary took place on Thursday December 15, 2005, at the Nokia Theater in New York City. The concert featured multiple musicians both past and present from Roadrunner bands, as well as musicians that did not originally perform on the All-Star Sessions album. The set list consisted of some of the most popular and famous songs released by Roadrunner Records as well as some of the original songs from the project's album. The 'core band', who performed on the majority of the songs, was Dino Cazares, Adam Duce, Paul Gray, Joey Jordison, Andreas Kisser, and Roy Mayorga.

=== Set list ===
No.	Title	Music	Performed by	Length
1.	"Punishment"	Biohazard	Performed by: Evan Seinfeld – vocals; Billy Graziadei – vocals, rhythm guitar; (C) Dino Cazares – rhythm guitar; Andreas Kisser – lead guitar; Adam Duce – bass; (C) Joey Jordison – drums	4:51
2.	"Set It Off"	Madball	Performed by: Jamey Jasta – vocals; Andreas Kisser – rhythm guitar; (C) Dino Cazares – rhythm guitar; Adam Duce – bass; (C) Joey Jordison – drums	2:55
3.	"March of the S.O.D"	Stormtroopers of Death	Performed by: Andreas Kisser – lead guitar; (C) Dino Cazares – rhythm guitar; Scott Ian – rhythm guitar; Paul Gray – bass; (C) Joey Jordison – drums	1:34
4.	"River Runs Red"	Life of Agony	Performed by: Keith Caputo - vocals; Andreas Kisser – lead guitar; (C) Dino Cazares – rhythm guitar; Scott Ian – rhythm guitar; Paul Gray – bass; (C) Joey Jordison – drums	2:09
5.	"The End Complete"	Obituary	Performed by: Glen Benton – vocals; Andreas Kisser – lead guitar; (C) Dino Cazares – rhythm guitar; Paul Gray – bass; (C) Joey Jordison – drums	5:02
6.	"Curse of the Pharaohs"	Mercyful Fate	Performed by: Tim "Ripper" Owens – vocals; Andreas Kisser – lead & rhythm guitars; James Murphy – rhythm & lead guitars; Adam Duce – bass; (C) Joey Jordison – drums	3:48
7.	"Abigail"	King Diamond	Performed by: Tim "Ripper" Owens – vocals; James Murphy – rhythm & lead guitars; Jeff Waters – lead & rhythm guitars; Paul Gray – bass; Roy Mayorga – drums; Rob Caggiano – keyboards	5:16
8.	"Allison Hell"	Annihilator	Performed by: Tim "Ripper" Owens – vocals; Jeff Waters – lead guitar, vocals; James Murphy – rhythm guitar; Adam Duce – bass; Roy Mayorga – drums	6:35
9.	"Dead by Dawn"	Deicide	Performed by: Glen Benton – vocals; Andreas Kisser – lead guitar; (C) Dino Cazares – rhythm guitar; Paul Gray – bass; Steve Asheim – drums	4:35
10.	"Pull Harder on the Strings of Your Martyr" (With outro of Pantera's "Domination")	Trivium	Performed by: (C) Matt Heafy – rhythm and lead guitar, vocals; Corey Beaulieu – lead and rhythm guitar, backing vocals; Paolo Gregoletto – bass; Travis Smith – drums; (C) Robb Flynn – additional vocals	6:09
11.	"My Last Serenade"	Killswitch Engage	Performed by: Howard Jones – vocals; Jesse Leech – vocals; Joel Stroetzel – rhythm guitar; Andreas Kisser – lead guitar; Mike D'Antonio – bass; Justin Foley – drums	3:58
12.	"Pure Hatred"	Chimaira	Performed by: Jamey Jasta – vocals; Andreas Kisser – rhythm guitar; (C) Dino Cazares – rhythm guitar; Adam Duce – bass; (C) Joey Jordison – drums	4:32
13.	"Replica"	Fear Factory	Performed by: (C) Matt Heafy – vocals; Andreas Kisser – rhythm guitar; (C) Dino Cazares – rhythm guitar; Adam Duce – bass; (C) Joey Jordison – drums	4:06
14.	"Black No. 1"	Type O Negative	Performed by: Ville Valo – vocals; Andreas Kisser – lead guitar; (C) Dino Cazares – rhythm guitar; Nadja Peulen – bass; (C) Joey Jordison – drums; Rob Caggiano – keyboards	6:00
15.	"Tired 'n Lonely"	Roadrunner United	Performed by: Keith Caputo - vocals; Matt Baumbach – lead guitar; Acey Slade – rhythm guitar; Nadja Peulen – bass; (C) Joey Jordison – drums; Rob Caggiano – keyboards	3:55
16.	"Bother"	Stone Sour	Performed by: Keith Caputo - vocals; Corey Taylor – vocals, guitar	6:15
17.	"The Rich Man"	Roadrunner United	Performed by: Corey Taylor – vocals; Jeff Waters – rhythm guitar; Jordan Whelan – rhythm guitar; Paul Gray – bass; Andols Herrick – drums	6:30
18.	"The Dagger"	Roadrunner United	Performed by: (C) Robb Flynn – vocals; Howard Jones – vocals; Jeff Waters – lead guitar; Andreas Kisser – rhythm guitar; Jordan Whelan – rhythm guitar; Adam Duce – rhythm guitar; Paul Gray – bass; Andols Herrick – drums	5:59
19.	"The End"	Roadrunner United	Performed by: (C) Matt Heafy – vocals; Logan Mader – rhythm guitar; (C) Dino Cazares – rhythm guitar; Nadja Peulen – bass; Roy Mayorga – drums	3:31
20.	"Eye for an Eye"	Soulfly	Performed by: Brian Fair – vocals; Logan Mader – lead guitar; (C) Dino Cazares – rhythm guitar; Adam Duce – bass; Roy Mayorga – drums	4:35
21.	"Refuse/Resist"	Sepultura	Performed by: (C) Robb Flynn – vocals; Andreas Kisser – lead guitar; Scott Ian – rhythm guitar; (C) Dino Cazares – rhythm guitar; Phil Demmel – rhythm guitar; Adam Duce – bass; Roy Mayorga – drums	4:09
22.	"Surfacing"	Slipknot	Performed by: (C) Robb Flynn – vocals; Andreas Kisser – rhythm guitar; (C) Dino Cazares – rhythm guitar; Adam Duce – bass; Roy Mayorga – drums	4:10
23.	"Davidian"	Machine Head	Performed by: (C) Robb Flynn – vocals; (C) Matt Heafy – vocals; Tim Williams – vocals; Andreas Kisser – lead & rhythm guitars; Logan Mader – rhythm & lead guitars; (C) Dino Cazares – rhythm guitar; Paul Gray – bass; (C) Joey Jordison – drums	6:05
24.	"(sic)"	Slipknot	Performed by: Corey Taylor – vocals; Tommy Vext – vocals; Andreas Kisser – rhythm guitar; (C) Dino Cazares – rhythm guitar; Scott Ian – rhythm guitar; Paul Gray – bass; (C) Joey Jordison – drums	4:38
25.	"Roots Bloody Roots"	Sepultura	Performed by: (C) Robb Flynn – vocals; Corey Taylor – vocals; Howard Jones – vocals; Jesse Leach – vocals; Tommy Vext – vocals; Andreas Kisser – lead guitar; Scott Ian – rhythm guitar; (C) Dino Cazares – rhythm guitar; Paul Gray – bass; Adam Duce – bass; (C) Joey Jordison – drums; Roy Mayorga – percussion	6:22
Total length:				1:57:39
