= Pass Out of Existence =

Studio album by Chimaira
- Released: October 2, 2001
- Recorded: 2001 at Third Stone in North Hollywood, California
- Genre: Nu metal
- Length: 62:30; 66:31 (with bonus track)
- Label: Roadrunner
- Producer: Andrew Murdock

Chimaira chronology
| This Present Darkness (2000) | Pass Out of Existence (2001) | The Impossibility of Reason (2003) |

Professional ratings
Review scores
| Source | Rating |
|---|---|
| Allmusic | 4.5/5 stars |

Pass Out of Existence is the debut studio album by American heavy metal band Chimaira, released on October 2, 2001. According to vocalist Mark Hunter, as of 2003, the band has sold 44,000 copies of the album in the United States alone. Pass Out of Existence features an altogether different sound when compared to the band's later albums, leaning more towards nu metal rather than the groove metal style featured in later material. Its heavy use of electronics has also been noted.

Prior to the album’s release, the track "Dead Inside" was performed on the short lived USA Network program Farmclub.com. This appearance prompted Roadrunner Records to sign Chimaira. Pass Out of Existence features re-recordings of two songs that were included on the band’s previous release, This Present Darkness, which are “Sphere” and “Painting the White to Grey”.

== Production, sound, and content ==
Unlike other Chimaira records, Pass Out of Existence was recorded with seven-string guitars in dropped A tuning. It emphasizes programming and sampling and, consequently, has been considered less heavy than Chimaira's following albums. In a 2004 interview, synthesizer player Chris Spicuzza acknowledged this but pointed out that it was largely an issue with the mixing that gives this impression. Vocalist Mark Hunter would later disparage the sampling as "ear candy" and stated that the band's 2003 effort The Impossibility of Reason had a more focused approach to sampling.

Despite some criticisms and the band's later sound change, the album was still positively praised by some. Worship Metal stated "Chimaira’s bizarre melding of death metal, groove metal and nu-metal’s penchant for electronic noises marked them out as an anomaly from the start."

Stephen Carpenter of Deftones lent a hand during the writing stages for the song "Rizzo".

Some editions of Pass Out of Existence include a hidden track at the end of "Jade", extending the track's total runtime to 13:57. The Japanese/Australian pressing includes the bonus track "Without Moral Restraint".

== Touring and promotion ==
In October 2001, Chimaira would join and befriend Slayer on their God Hates the World Tour. This would later prove beneficial when drummer Ricky Evensand left Chimaira in 2004; going on advice from Slayer guitarist Kerry King, Mark Hunter contacted Kevin Talley who would go on to fill the role for two years.

The album cover is featured in the movie The Rules of Attraction along with other albums by Roadrunner bands such as Fear Factory and Slipknot. Chimaira would later tour with both bands in the Jägermeister Tour in 2004.

A music video was made for the song "Sp Lit", which gained airplay on Uranium.

== Track listing ==
All tracks are written by Chimaira, except where noted.

| No. | Title | Length |
|---|---|---|
| 1. | "Let Go" | 3:51 |
| 2. | "Dead Inside" | 3:45 |
| 3. | "Severed" | 3:16 |
| 4. | "Lumps" | 3:54 |
| 5. | "Pass Out of Existence" | 3:24 |
| 6. | "Abeo" | 1:44 |
| 7. | "Sp Lit" | 3:12 |
| 8. | "Painting the White to Grey" | 4:44 |
| 9. | "Taste My..." | 4:02 |
| 10. | "Rizzo" | 4:38 |
| 11. | "Sphere" | 4:20 |
| 12. | "Forced Life" | 3:48 |
| 13. | "Options" | 3:50 |
| 14. | "Jade" | 13:58 |
| Total length: | | 62:30 |

Japanese edition bonus track
| No. | Title | Length |
|---|---|---|
| 15. | "Without Moral Restraint" | 4:02 |
| Total length: | | 66:31 |

20th Anniversary Edition Bonus Tracks
| No. | Title | Writer(s) | Length |
|---|---|---|---|
| 15. | "Without Moral Restraint" | | 4:02 |
| 16. | "Severed" (2021 Remix) | | 4:01 |
| 17. | "Split" (2021 Remix) | | 3:13 |
| 18. | "Painting the White to Grey" (2021 Remix) | | 4:42 |
| 19. | "Taste My.." (Demo) | | 4:06 |
| 20. | "Fascination Street" (The Cure cover) | Robert Smith, Simon Gallup, Porl Thompson, Roger O'Donnell, Boris Williams | 4:55 |
| 21. | "Let It Go" (Live in Orlando 2002) | | 3:53 |
| 22. | "Lumps" (Live in Orlando 2002) | | 4:20 |
| 23. | "Severed" (Live in Orlando 2002) | | 3:11 |
| 24. | "Split" (Live in Orlando 2002) | | 4:12 |
| 25. | "Silence" (Live in Orlando 2002) | | 1:54 |
| 26. | "Forced Life" (Live in Orlando 2002) | | 3:45 |
| 27. | "Dead Inside" (Live in Orlando 2002) | | 3:55 |
| 28. | "This Present Darkness" (Live in Orlando 2002) | | 6:25 |

== Personnel ==
=== Musicians ===
Chimaira

- Mark Hunter – vocals, additional guitar on "Abeo" and "Jade"
- Rob Arnold – guitars
- Jason Hager – guitars
- Chris Spicuzza – electronics
- Jim LaMarca – bass
- Andols Herrick – drums

Additional musicians

- Stephen Carpenter – guitars on "Rizzo"

=== Production ===
- Produced by Andrew Murdock
- Recorded by Andrew Murdock, Justin Walden and Scott Francisco (Recorded at Third Stone, N. Hollywood)
- Mixed by Andrew Murdock and Ted Regier (Mixed at Larrabee Studios, W. Hollywood)
- Justin Walden – keyboards and synthesizer editing/sound design
- Mastered by Tom Baker at Precision Mastering
- Artwork by Animated Noise Studios (Michael Bodine II, Neil Allardice, and Bobby Czzowitz)
- Artwork direction by Chris Spicuzza
- Photography by Daniel Moss
