= The Infection =

Studio album by Chimaira
- Released: April 20, 2009
- Recorded: September–December 2008 at Spider Studios
- Genre: Groove metal
- Length: 55:36
- Labels: Ferret Music (US); Nuclear Blast (Worldwide)
- Producer: Ben Schigel

Chimaira chronology
Resurrection (2007)	The Infection (2009)	The Age of Hell (2011)

Singles from The Infection
- 1. "Secrets of the Dead" Released: 2009; 2. "Destroy and Dominate" Released: August 11, 2009

Professional ratings
Review scores
Source	Rating
AllMusic	3.5/5 stars
About.com	3.5/5 stars
Blabbermouth.net	7/10
Kerrang!	2.5/5 stars
MetalSucks	4.5/5 stars

The Infection is the fifth studio album by American heavy metal band Chimaira. Released in the US on April 20, 2009, and worldwide on April 24, it reached position 30 on the Billboard 200 charts on its first week of release, selling around 15,000 copies. This was improvement from the previous album's debut at No. 42. It is also their third album featuring the classic lineup and the last album to feature long time bassist Jim Lamarca, drummer Andols Herrick, as well as longtime keyboard player Chris Spicuzza.

== Promotion ==
Within the order of promoting the album, the band revealed a track name from the album and a piece of the album cover on the main page of their website approximately every other day. The final track and entire cover were revealed on February 12, 2009. "Secrets of the Dead" was released as a single on iTunes March 3, 2009 and was first played for the public at their Chimaira Christmas show in Cleveland, Ohio. The song "Destroy and Dominate" was played live for the first time on Friday, March 6, 2009, at the Dubai Desert Rock Festival 2009. "Destroy and Dominate" was released for free on Chimaira's official Twitter profile on March 16, 2009, for one hour only. On April 16, 2009, Chimaira released the first nine tracks of The Infection on their MySpace profile for listening. The song, "On Broken Glass" is available as downloadable content for Guitar Hero World Tour.

== Production ==
Rob Arnold told Kerrang! that "Try To Survive" was the first song written for the album.

All songs on the album were written in drop C except for Destroy and Dominate, The Disappearing Sun, and Try to Survive, which were written in drop B.

=== Fan involvement ===
In order to further involve the fans and promote the album, Chimaira released the stem files that were used to create the "Destroy and Dominate" music video. Fans were asked to create their own version of the music video. The members of the band chose their favorites and the prizes went as follows:

1st Place: The Infection (Deluxe Tin Box) and two concert tickets to see Chimaira
2nd Place: Two concert tickets to see Chimaira or a Chimaira T-shirt
3rd Place: Two concert tickets to see Chimaira or a Chimaira T-shirt

== Track listing ==
All tracks are written by Rob Arnold and Mark Hunter, except where noted.

No.	Title	Length
1.	"The Venom Inside"	4:05
2.	"Frozen in Time"	4:05
3.	"Coming Alive" (Arnold)	3:04
4.	"Secrets of the Dead" (Arnold, Hunter, Matt DeVries, Andols Herrick)	4:25
5.	"The Disappearing Sun"	4:24
6.	"Impending Doom" (Arnold, Hunter, Chris Spicuzza)	6:05
7.	"On Broken Glass" (Arnold, Hunter, DeVries)	3:46
8.	"Destroy and Dominate" (Arnold, Hunter, DeVries)	4:42
9.	"Try to Survive"	4:40
10.	"The Heart of It All"	14:52
Total length:		55:36

Limited edition bonus tracks
No.	Title	Length
11.	"Revenge"	3:12
12.	"Convictions" (State of Conviction cover, feat. Jason Popson of Mushroomhead and Pitch Black Forecast)	2:13
13.	"Warpath"	4:18
Total length:		65:19

== Limited deluxe fan edition ==
This is a special "Briefcase" version of the album. Only 580 are said to exist, and the first 100 bought are signed by the band. Extra features include:

- Metal Briefcase packaging
- Chimaira Infection Logo Flag
- CD/DVD Edition of the album (Features the bonus track "Revenge" and a "Making of" DVD)
- "Syringe" USB in metal box featuring the bonus tracks "Convictions" and "Warpath", a bonus CD that includes instrumental demo versions of all tracks, wallpapers, Buddy Icons and more
- Guitar Pick Pack featuring signature picks of all guitarists
- Booklet featuring never before seen photos of the band in studio
- Laminate

== Charts ==
Chart (2009)	Peak position
Finnish Albums Chart	32
The Billboard 200	30

== Personnel ==
Chimaira

- Mark Hunter – vocals
- Rob Arnold – lead guitar
- Matt DeVries – rhythm guitar
- Jim LaMarca – bass guitar
- Andols Herrick – drums
- Chris Spicuzza – keyboards, electronics

Additional Musicians

- Jason Popson – vocals on "Convictions"

Production

- Produced by Ben Schigel, Mark Hunter and Rob Arnold at Spider Studios
- Engineered by Tony Gammalo
- Mixed by Chris "Zeuss" Harris at Planet Z Studios
- Mastered by Ted Jensen at Sterling Sound
- Photography by Todd Bell and Rob Dobi
- Design concept by Chris Spicuzza and Mark Hunter
