= Resurrection (Chimaira album) =

Studio album by Chimaira
- Released: March 6, 2007
- Recorded: 2006
- Genre: Groove metal
- Length: 51:35 (regular edition); 59:03 (limited edition)
- Label: Ferret Music (U.S.); Nuclear Blast (Worldwide)
- Producer: Jason Suecof

Chimaira chronology
Chimaira (2005)	Resurrection (2007)	The Infection (2009)

Singles from Resurrection
- 1. "Resurrection" Released: March 12, 2007

Professional ratings
Review scores
Source	Rating
AllMusic	3.5/5 stars
Alternative Press	3/5
Chronicles of Chaos	7.5/10
Metal Injection	7/10

Resurrection is the fourth studio album by Chimaira, released on March 6, 2007. Debuting at number 42 on the Billboard 200 charts, Resurrection shipped about 16,000 copies sold in its first week. The album was released in two forms: a regular version, and a limited edition version with different cover artwork and a DVD documentary of the making of the album. Chimaira's first album with Ferret Music since leaving Roadrunner Records, Resurrection features original drummer Andols Herrick who rejoined the group shortly before the writing process. Resurrection is also the first Chimaira album to feature some additional backing vocals by keyboardist Chris Spicuzza.

The international edition issued by Nuclear Blast was issued in a digipak along with the DVD documentary. However, the cover artwork was the standard one.

There's also a tin box limited to 500 copies from Nuclear Blast Germany, that includes the album with the DVD, plus six pictures of the band and a numbered authenticity certificate.

The title track appears on the soundtrack for the video game Saint's Row 2.

== Track listing ==
All lyrics are written by Mark Hunter.

No.	Title	Music	Length
1.	"Resurrection"	Arnold; DeVries; Hunter	4:37
2.	"Pleasure in Pain"	Hunter; Arnold	3:04
3.	"Worthless"	Arnold; DeVries	3:44
4.	"Six"	Arnold; DeVries; Hunter; Herrick	9:44
5.	"No Reason to Live"	Arnold	3:44
6.	"Killing the Beast"	Hunter	3:47
7.	"The Flame"	Arnold	5:23
8.	"End It All"	Arnold; Hunter	4:22
9.	"Black Heart"	Hunter; Arnold	4:34
10.	"Needle"	DeVries; Hunter; Arnold	3:08
11.	"Empire"	DeVries; Hunter; Arnold	5:39
Total length:			51:35

Bonus tracks
No.	Title	Music	Length
12.	"Kingdom of Heartache"	DeVries; Hunter	4:11
13.	"Paralyzed"	DeVries	3:06
Total length:			59:03

== Personnel ==
Chimaira

- Mark Hunter – lead vocals, rhythm guitar, keyboards, theremin, samplers
- Rob Arnold – lead guitar
- Chris Spicuzza – keyboards, backing vocals
- Jim LaMarca – bass
- Matt DeVries – rhythm guitar
- Andols Herrick – drums

Additional musicians

- Jason Suecof – additional keyboards and samples
- Steve Steverson – additional vocals on "Worthless"

Production

- Produced by Jason Suecof at Audiohammer Studios
- Mixed, engineered and tracked drums by Andy Sneap at Backstage Studios
- Additional engineering by Mark Lewis
- Mastered by Ted Jensen at Sterling Sound
- Artwork by Dennis Sibeijn
- Photography by Todd Bell
