= Rob Arnold =

American musician (born 1980)

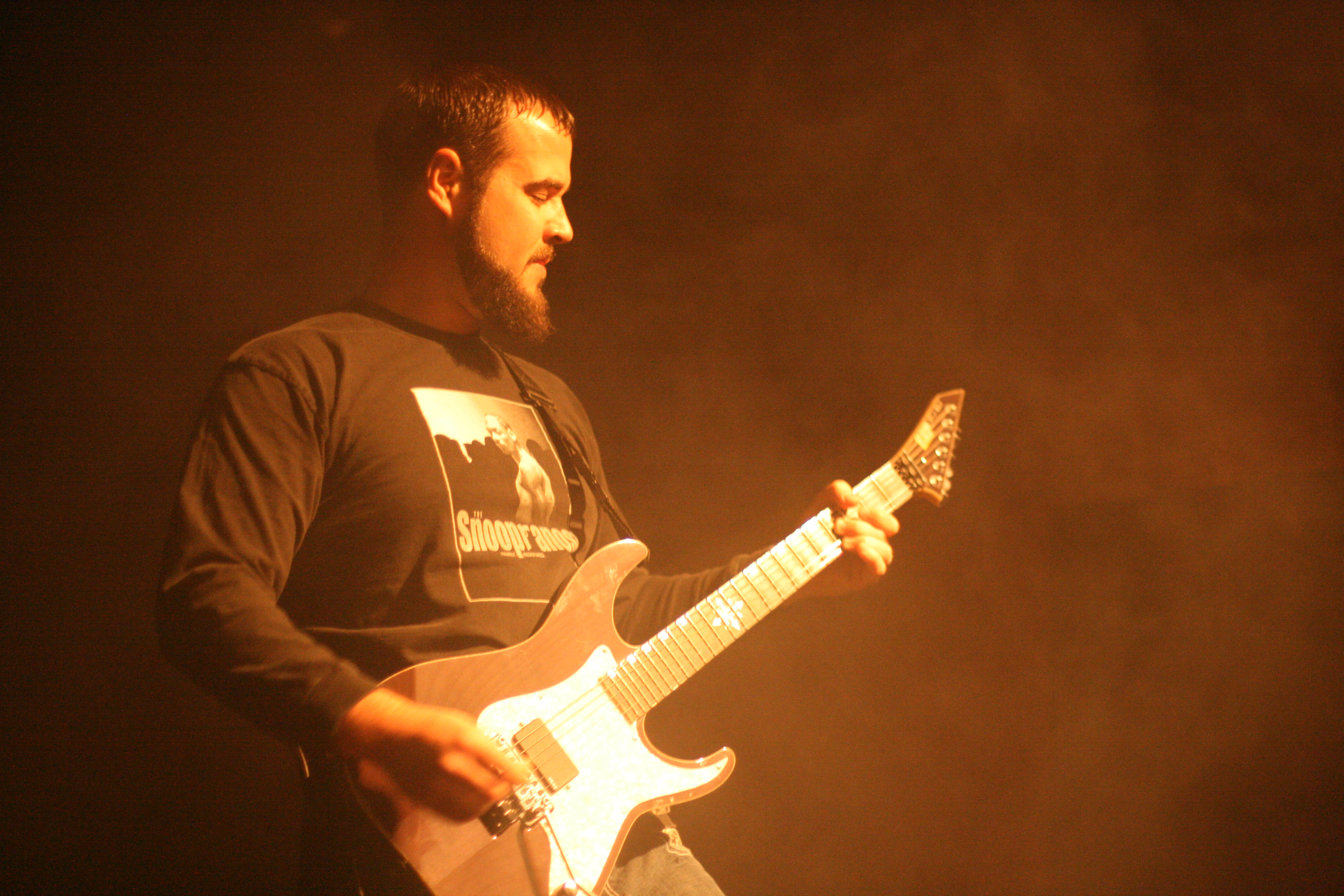
- Rob Arnold performing live in Chimaira at the Nokia Theatre Times Square, on June 25, 2008

Background information
- Born: January 3, 1980 (age 46)
- Genres: Groove metal; metalcore; death metal; nu metal
- Occupations: Musician; record producer
- Instruments: Guitar; bass; drums
- Years active: 1998–present
- Labels: Roadrunner; Nuclear Blast; Ferret; E1 Music; Metal Blade
- Member of: Chimaira
- Formerly of: Six Feet Under
- Website: robarnoldworld.com

Rob Arnold (born January 3, 1980) is an American musician, best known for performing as the lead guitarist of the metal band Chimaira and later as a guitarist of the death metal band Six Feet Under. In an interview with Roadrunner Records, he named Kirk Hammett, "Dimebag" Darrell Abbott, Dave Mustaine, Marty Friedman and Kerry King as being influential to his playing style.

Arnold is endorsed by ESP Guitars and has his own signature model, the RA-600, which has an M body shape based on the ESP LTD m-1000. In Chimaira, Arnold preferred the drop-C tuning (CGCFAD). He also uses custom ESP 7-string guitars, tuned to drop-A (AEADGBE). Arnold has been a long-time user of Peavey amps, using the 5150II since the beginning of Chimaira. Since the mid-2000s, he uses a Peavey 6505+ amp head paired with a Mesa Boogie Cabinet.

During the mid-2000s, he released a Signature Series guitar with ESP Guitars based on his custom RA-3 model. It is called the ESP LTD RA-600. He also has an instructional DVD available through The Rock House Method which focuses on metal guitar, soloing, riffing, and song writing.

Arnold is the lead guitarist for his band, The Elite, with former Baphomet/Stemm front man T.J. Frost, and Bleed the Sky/Chimaira/DevilDriver drummer Austin D'Amond. They released an EP titled WW3 in July 2009, and their debut full-length album Total Destruction in September 2018.

On February 27, 2011, it was announced that Arnold along with fellow Chimaira guitarist Matt DeVries, and former Chimaira drummer, Kevin Talley, would be joining the band Six Feet Under. Arnold, Talley, and Six Feet Under vocalist, Chris Barnes, wrote and recorded 2011's Undead, then briefly toured Europe and the United States.

In November 2011, it was confirmed that Arnold would be leaving Chimaira after their Chimaira Christmas '11 show for personal reasons.

On May 22, 2012, Six Feet Under announced that guitarist Ola Englund would be replacing Arnold, who planned to retire from touring. The band suggested that Arnold may perhaps remain a central writing partner and collaborator on future Six Feet Under releases.

== Discography ==
Chimaira

- This Present Darkness (2000)
- Pass Out of Existence (2001)
- The Impossibility of Reason (2003)
- Chimaira (2005)
- Resurrection (2007)
- The Infection (2009)
- The Age of Hell (2011)

Six Feet Under

- Undead (2012)
- Unborn (2013)
- Unburied (2018)

The Elite

- The WW3 EP (2009)
- Total Destruction (2018)

The Disaster

- Healing Process (2018)

Rob Arnold (solo artist)

- Magnitude (2022)
- Menace (2023)
