= Chimaira =

American heavy metal band

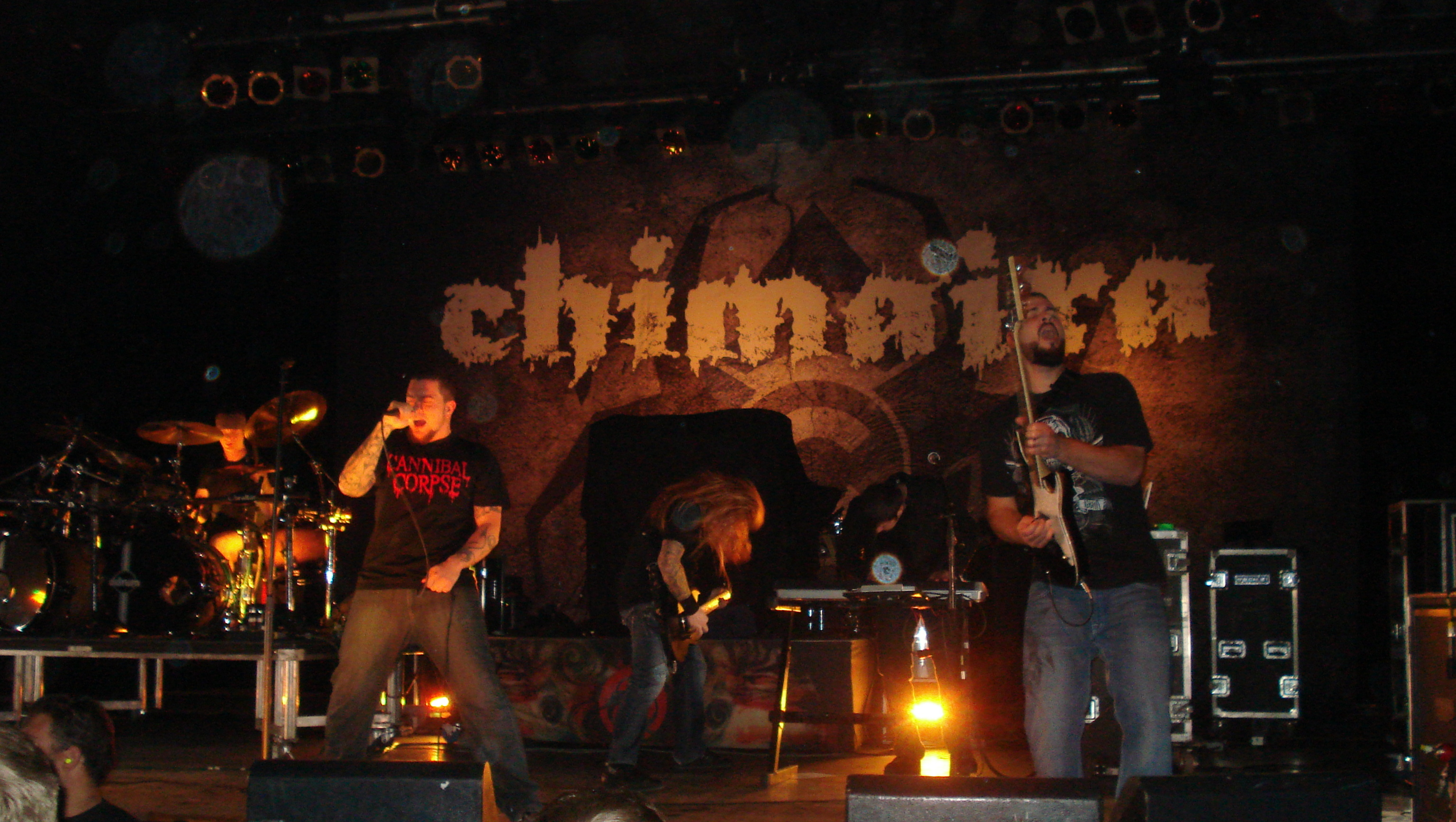
- Chimaira performing in 2009

Background information
- Origin: Cleveland, Ohio, U.S.
- Genres: Groove metal; metalcore; nu metal
- Years active: 1998–2014, 2017 (one-off reunion), 2023–present
- Labels: East Coast Empire, Roadrunner, Ferret, Nuclear Blast, eOne
- Members: Mark Hunter; Rob Arnold; Chris Spicuzza; Jim LaMarca; Matt DeVries; Austin D'Amond
- Past members: Jason Hager; Andrew Ermlick; Jason Genaro; Andols Herrick; Emil Werstler; Richard Evensand; Kevin Talley; Matt Szlachta; Jeremy Creamer; Sean Zatorsky
- Website: chimaira.com

Chimaira (/kaɪˈmɪərə/ ky-MEER-ə) is an American heavy metal band from Cleveland, Ohio. Formed in August 1998, the band's name is derived from the word Chimera, a monstrous creature in Greek mythology. Throughout its history, the band had numerous line-up changes, leaving vocalist Mark Hunter as the only constant member. The band dissolved in 2014, but announced a reunion in 2017 and a return in 2023 with most of the group's longtime members rejoined.

== History ==
=== Early days (1998–1999) ===
Prior to Chimaira, vocalist Mark Hunter and bassist Jim LaMarca were part of a hardcore band named Skipline, which lasted two years from 1996 to 1998. Shortly before Skipline's first ever Rhode Island show, the group was carjacked of their van (along with all of the inside equipment), which left the 4-piece band to find their way back to Ohio and effectively ended Skipline. Soon after the experience, Hunter was contacted by guitarist Jason Hager, who was part of a local Cleveland metalcore band known as Ascension, to form a new group. Hunter was ecstatic about the opportunity and agreed. Hunter and Hager recruited friends and previous bandmates Jason Genaro on drums and Andrew Ermlick on bass to complete the required positions for a line-up. Chimaira was officially founded in August 1998.

After a few practices, the four decided that the band needed to thicken their sound, and Ermlick recommended that Rob Arnold, a former bandmate from his time in Common Thread, could be recruited into the band as guitarist. Arnold's band at the time, Sanctum, had recently split, and he was available to join Chimaira. By 1999, Arnold joined the band soon after as lead guitarist, to which Hager was then moved to play rhythm.

The band recorded its first demo in January 1999. During the recording, Arnold recommended to Hunter and Hager that they replace Genaro with Arnold's former drummer Andols Herrick in the band Sanctum. After observing a cassette recording featuring Herrick's percussion, the band agreed to replace Genaro in favor of Herrick. Herrick then came along to the studio with the other four and recorded the drums for the demo the very next day.

The band spent much of 1999 doing various live shows around the United States, and during that year, Andrew Ermlick left the band to concentrate on his college studies and was replaced by Rob Lesniak. The band recorded a second demo that year, and it began to receive widespread airplay on several college radio stations around the area.

=== This Present Darkness and Pass out of Existence (2000–2002) ===
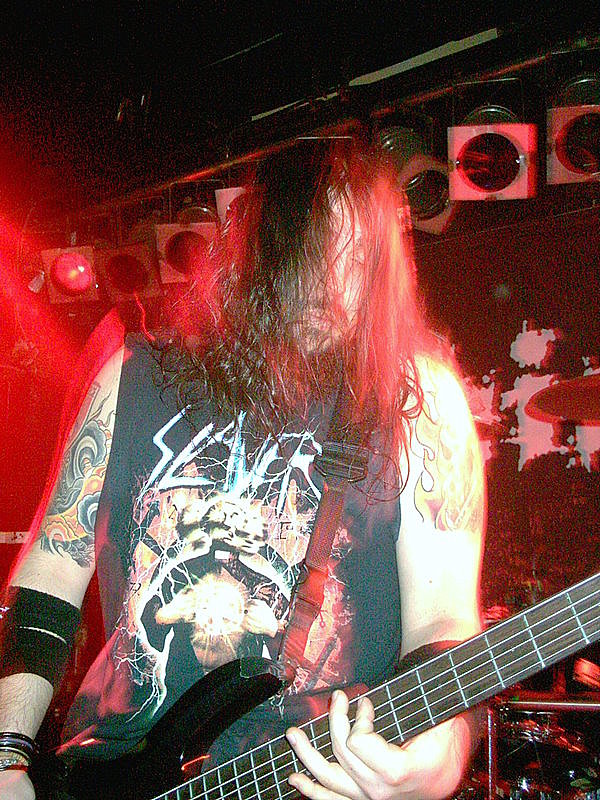
Bassist Jim LaMarca played with Hunter in their previous band, Skipline, and later joined Chimaira in 2000.

Eventually, the band recorded their debut EP, This Present Darkness, which was released in 2000 via the independent label East Coast Empire (based in Prospect, Connecticut) and charted in the top 10 at Metal Radio. Shortly after the release of TPD, Chimaira aligned with manager and A&R scout Thom Hazaert (who would go on to run prominent independent labels Corporate Punishment Records and THC Music), a longtime friend of sampler Chris Spicuzza, and continued to tour the US, playing consistently with bands including Hatebreed and God Forbid. The band recorded demo versions of several new tracks, including "Severed", "Taste My ...", and the fan-favorite "Dead Inside", as well as a cover of The Cure's "Fascination Street", which Hazaert shopped, eventually gaining interest from several major labels. During this time, the band also contributed a cover of the Accept classic "Balls to the Wall" to the ECW Wrestling album Anarchy Rocks Vol. 2.

Chimaira landed a spot performing "Dead Inside" in September of 2000 on the short-lived USA Network show Farmclub.com, and was subsequently signed to Roadrunner Records. By this time Jim LaMarca, who performed alongside Hunter in their prior band Skipline, was now bassist. Chris Spicuzza joined as well, handling all electronics duties. The six-piece quickly recorded its debut album Pass Out of Existence in 2001 with producer Mudrock, a nu metal album containing 14 tracks and featuring over an hour's worth of music. Released on October 2, 2001, the record would also feature a guest appearance from Deftones' guitarist Stephen Carpenter on the track "Rizzo". Shortly after the release of the album and the tour that was to follow, Jason Hager left the band when he discovered he was going to become a father. Matt DeVries, who also previously played in Ascension (with Hager), was recruited to take over as rhythm guitarist. The band promoted the album with steady touring with bands like Machine Head, Fear Factory, Ill Nino and Kittie among others, and were even invited by Slayer to open for them on their North American tour in late 2001.

However, despite consistent touring and high expectations from the band, Roadrunner Records had very little faith in the release and did minimal promotion for it, which resulted in poor sales; about 44,000 were sold two years after the album was released. There were also instances of concerts with extremely low attendance, according to singer Mark Hunter. In addition, a portion of the band's fanbase reacted negatively to the album, partly because of its cleaner, more polished production compared to This Present Darkness. This era of the band was later reflected on by members as a particularly difficult time, especially at the beginning of their The Dehumanizing Process video.

=== The Impossibility of Reason (2003–2004) ===
The band returned home in late 2002 to begin writing and recording its next full-length album, The Impossibility of Reason. Due to the previous album's lack of success, the band saw the album's production and writing as a second chance, and felt high pressure from several parties, including their label Roadrunner Records. The band also decided to change their sound drastically, ditching 7-string guitars and deemphasizing electronic effects, in order to adopt a rawer, more aggressive sound oriented towards groove metal. The album's making was documented and later seen on their debut DVD release The Dehumanizing Process. After the release and ensuing tours, drummer Andols Herrick left the band. As evidenced in the DVD documentary, Herrick appeared unenthusiastic about constantly being on the road. He returned home to attend college to obtain a music degree.

Chimaira eventually welcomed Ricky Evensand as its new drummer. Hailing from Sweden, Evensand was a part of Soilwork for a short time. Evensand's stay in Chimaira was relatively short-lived. Going on advice from Slayer guitarist Kerry King, Hunter contacted Kevin Talley, an experienced death metal drummer who had previously been in the bands Dying Fetus and Misery Index. With Talley on board, the band finished its remaining tour dates before returning home for some downtime. They soon began the writing and recording process for their next album. Songs from the album were featured on MythBusters for the episode "Talking to Plants".

=== Chimaira (2005–2006) ===
By the first quarter of 2005, the band had finished most of its next release and began to tour again. The self-titled album, the first (and only) one featuring Talley, was released in August 2005 while the band was taking part in the inaugural Sounds of the Underground tour. Hunter and DeVries also participated in another musical project that year, Roadrunner Records' twenty-fifth anniversary CD entitled The All-Star Sessions. Also taking part in the recording of several songs was former drummer Andols Herrick. These recording sessions reignited Herrick's interest in being in a full-time band. The band also co-headlined the Kings of Cleveland concert with Mushroomhead.

=== Resurrection (2007–2008) ===
In 2006, the band was released from its contract with Roadrunner Records and eventually signed with Ferret Records for United States distribution. The band also acquired a deal with Nuclear Blast for international operations. The band was said to be excited about its new deals, and its fourth full-length studio album Resurrection, which was released on March 6, 2007. The band has stated they felt "rejuvenated" after its split with Roadrunner and the readmission of Herrick on drums. The only downside of this happy event was that the band decided to call off the Eastpak Antidote tour with Soilwork, Sonic Syndicate and Caliban. Chimaira was replaced by Dark Tranquillity. In 2008, Chimaira joined Brendon Small on the Dethklok tour 2008 as a guest appearance.

=== The Infection (2009–2010) ===
Before the album's release, the band had been posting short clips on the webpage from the upcoming album, written in Cleveland, Ohio, with producer Ben Schigel, who previously produced the band's album The Impossibility of Reason and their self-titled album. The new album, entitled The Infection, is mixed by Zeuss, who mixed and produced albums for Hatebreed and Shadows Fall. Chimaira stated they were pushing for an April 21, 2009, release date on the new album. At its annual Chimaira Christmas show on December 30, 2008, they debuted a new song entitled "Secrets of the Dead".

I think that we've been a band that over the past fourteen years encapsulates the best elements of heavy metal. In our music you can hear elements of death metal in one instant only to hear influences from classic thrash metal the next moment. Chimaira has always been a hybrid metal band and we'll continue doing that. We're a band that never quits, no matter the odds.

— Mark Hunter, on the essence of Chimaira

The first single of the album "Secrets of the Dead" was released on March 3, 2009. The Infection was released worldwide on April 21, 2009, and debuted at number 30 on the Billboard 200. During several European tour dates supporting The Infection, Chimaira had Emil Werstler of Dååth filling in for Matt DeVries, as DeVries' girlfriend had their first child.

The 10th annual Chimaira Christmas show was held at the House of Blues in Cleveland, Ohio on December 27, 2009. It was filmed for a live DVD titled Coming Alive, which was released in 2010.

In late 2010, bassist Jim LaMarca retired from the band. Chimaira released the following statement regarding his departure: "After a decade of good times and achievements, our friend and band mate Jim LaMarca [bass] has decided to retire from CHIMAIRA. We wish him nothing but the best as he settles in and starts a family. As for seeking a replacement ... we'll cross that bridge down the line. In the meantime, consider it 'business as usual' with the CHIMAIRA you know and love."

=== The Age of Hell, line-up changes, Crown of Phantoms, and split (2011–2014) ===
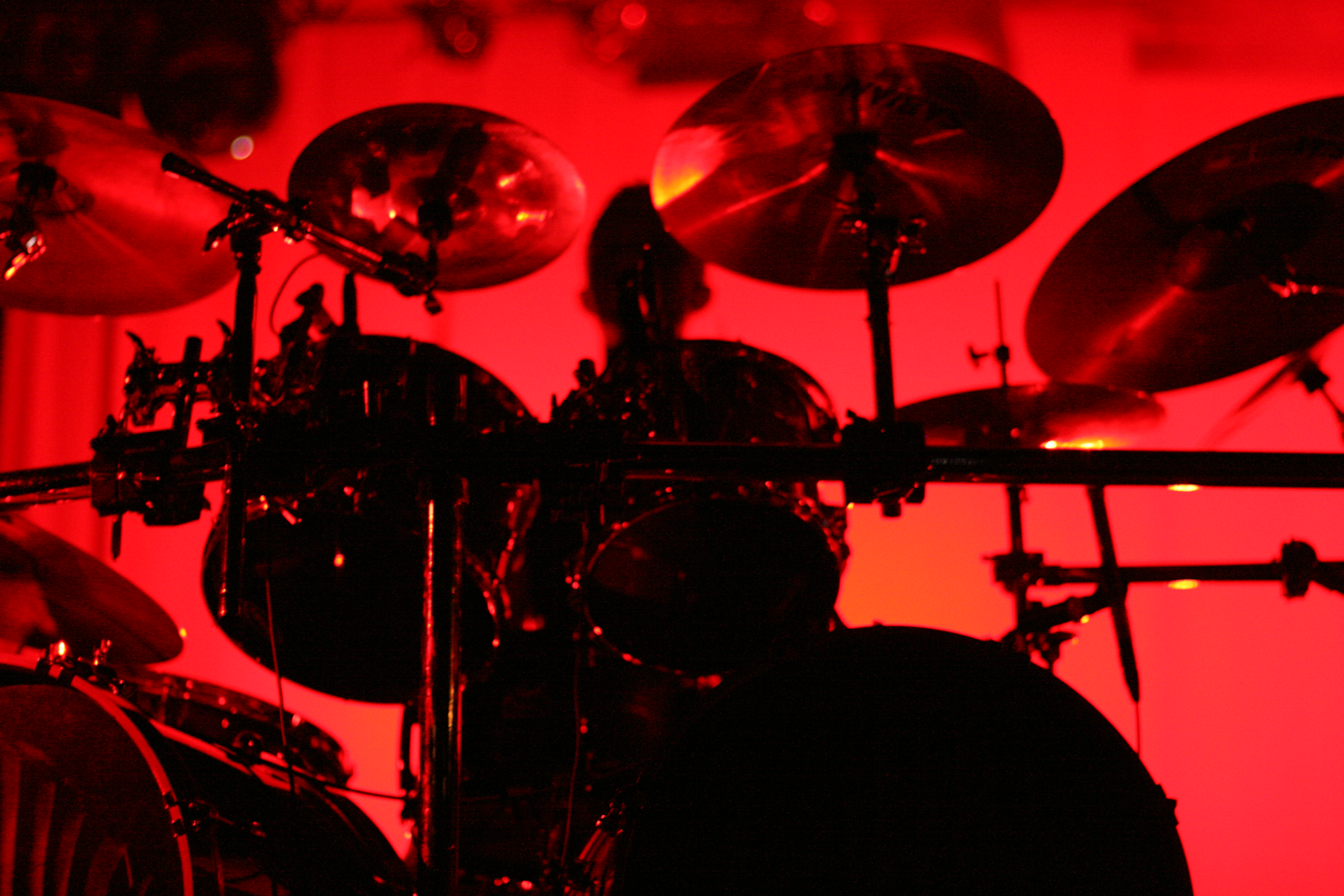
Drummer Andols Herrick has been in and out of Chimaira a total of three times.

On January 24, 2011, it was confirmed that Chimaira was signed to eOne Music.

Chimaira finished recording their 6th album in March 2011, expected to be released in August 2011. Also in March, Chimaira released a cover of The Troggs' "Wild Thing" as a single on YouTube and iTunes, in response to the "Charlie Sheen phenomenon".

On April 5, 2011, keyboardist and programmer Chris Spicuzza announced he would be leaving the band (a decision he made in January), citing a "negative environment" and the general state of the music industry. He also announced his next project, a mobile gaming startup called IRL Gaming. Spicuzza did not contribute to the new album.

On April 13, drummer Andols Herrick announced that he, too, would be leaving the band due to differences. He was asked to leave by the other members of the band. Andols has technically been out of the band since December 2010 (prior to Chimaira Christmas 11). It was not announced until April 2011, however. Herrick was asked to rejoin the band, but he declined. He has said he looks forward to moving on with other musical projects. He said that there is no bad blood between the band and himself and that they all remain friends. Herrick did not contribute to the new album. However, he was around during the time of the song-writing and assures the fans through his Facebook page that the new album is sounding pure as ever. On May 28, at Peabody's in Cleveland, OH, the new album was revealed to be titled The Age of Hell that was met with the debut live performance of the song "Trigger Finger", which will be included on the record.

The Age of Hell is a transitional album. The songs on it aren't that bad, but the fire and the passion simply wasn't there. It was more about holding on to something that was falling apart and recording those emotions. I think it's still a decent metal album, but Crown of Phantoms is really special to me, because of all the fire and passion. The Age of Hell was basically me and Rob (Arnold) recording an album with a stand-in drummer. It isn't a good representation of what we are all about. If fans had the chance to name an album which shouldn't have the Chimaira mark on it, I'd suggest The Age of Hell would be the appropriate album.

— Mark Hunter, on The Age of Hell and line-up changes

The Age of Hell was released in the US on August 16, 2011. Frontman Mark Hunter states, "Words can't express what it took to create this album. We hope you love it as much as we do. Turn it up loud, this is Chimaira at [its] finest." The album was also released in the UK through Metal Hammer magazine. In November 2011, Mark Hunter released a statement stating that guitarists Matt DeVries and Rob Arnold are leaving Chimaira after Chimaira Christmas '11. He added that they are leaving for 'personal reasons'.

It was confirmed that Emil Werstler will be replacing Rob Arnold as the lead guitarist, meanwhile Matt Szlachta from Dirge Within and Jeremy Creamer from Dååth will be handling rhythm guitar and bass duties respectively.

On December 29, 2012, Chimaira Christmas 13 revealed a new song from the upcoming 2013 album, titled "I Despise". The same day an official teaser for the new album was added to YouTube, titled Chimaira 2013. On April 18, 2013, the band released a teaser video on their YouTube channel revealing the album title, Crown of Phantoms, and a release date, July 30, 2013.

On August 31, 2014, Emil Werstler departed to pursue a solo career. The rest of the band mutually decided to part ways.

On September 4, 2014, Mark Hunter announced the formal break-up of Chimaira.

=== 2017-present: Reunions ===
==== 2017 Chimaira Christmas reunion ====
In late 2017 guitarist Rob Arnold uploaded an image depicting the numbers "1514688300". It was later revealed to be a Unix timestamp of the date and time of the band's reunion show. On June 21, 2017, ThePRP.com announced that a one-off reunion of the band's "classic" lineup would take place on December 30, 2017, during the group's Chimaira Christmas event, which would be seven years since this line-up performed together. The band later shared this news on their official Facebook page, confirming the news.

On December 15, it was announced that drummer Andols Herrick would no longer be a part of the reunion show due to health issues, and that former Chimaira drummer Austin D'Amond would be his replacement.

==== Canceled 2020 Christmas reunion ====
On October 14, 2020, Arnold revealed that Chimaira had begun planning another reunion show; Chimaira Christmas 2020. However, due to the COVID-19 pandemic, these plans were put on hold. "[the show] had been booked but it hadn't been announced yet. We weren't gonna announce it until maybe mid summer". Arnold was hesitant to say that the band was alive but did say that it was "certainly reawakened and was prepped to emerge". Arnold also said that there was discussion of putting together new music, that riffs had been passed around but no full songs had been completed and there were no immediate plans to record or release a new album.

==== 2023 and 2024 reunions ====
On December 13, 2022, the band announced two reunion shows to take place in May 2023 to celebrate the 20th anniversary of The Impossibility of Reason. Five months later their Instagram account posted an image of the band's logo with "XXV" in the middle, potentially hinting at a 25th anniversary event.

The band announced performances for 2024 at Inkcarceration Fest, their first festival concert in 14 years, and Headbanger's Boat, headlined by Lamb of God.

== Musical style ==
Chimaira is part of the new wave of American heavy metal. Their music is considered groove metal, metalcore, and nu metal (particularly their earlier albums), with elements of death metal, thrash metal, hardcore punk, and industrial metal.

== Band members ==
=== Current lineup ===
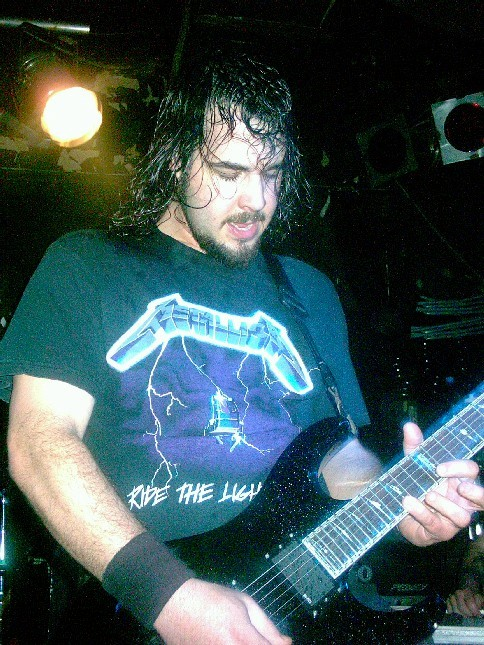
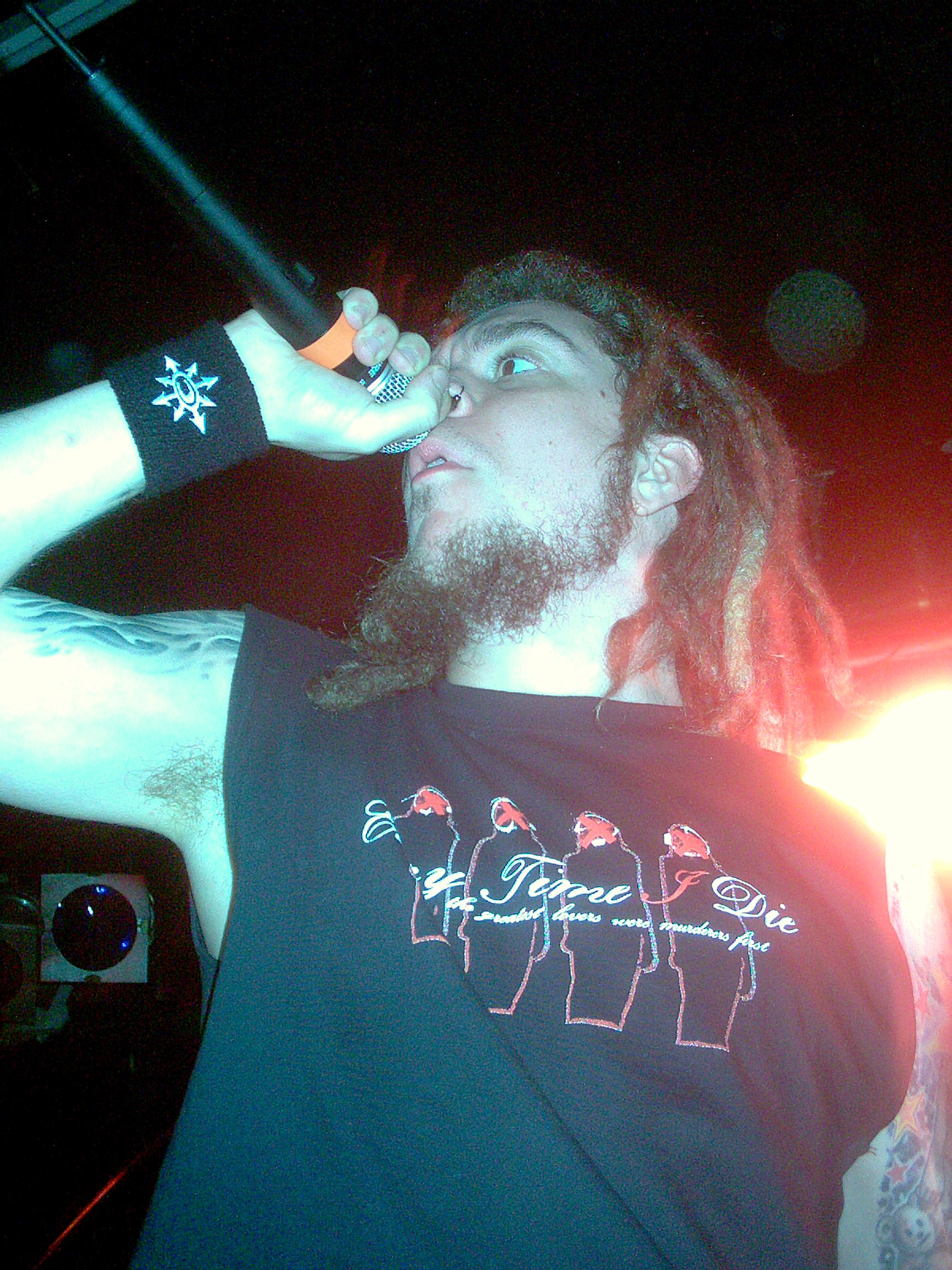
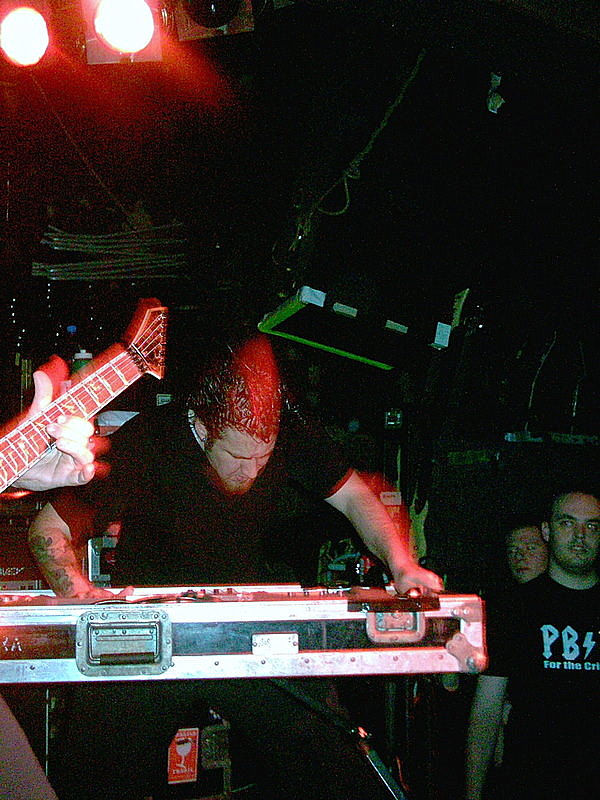
Guitarist Rob Arnold (left), vocalist Mark Hunter (center), and keyboardist Chris Spicuzza (right) performing in 2004
- Mark Hunter – lead vocals (1998–2014, 2017, 2023–present)
- Rob Arnold – lead guitar (1999–2011, 2017, 2023–present)
- Chris Spicuzza – keyboards, electronics, backing vocals (2000–2011, 2017, 2023–present)
- Jim LaMarca – bass (2000–2010, 2017, 2023–present)
- Matt DeVries – rhythm guitar (2001–2011, 2017, 2023–present)
- Austin D'Amond – drums (2011–2014, 2017, 2023–present)

=== Previous members ===
- Jason Hager – lead guitar (1998–1999), rhythm guitar (1998–2001)
- Jason Genaro – drums (1998–1999)
- Andrew Ermlick – bass (1998–1999)
- Rob Lesniak – bass (1999–2000)
- Richard Evensand – drums (2003–2004)
- Kevin Talley – drums (2004–2006)
- Andols Herrick – drums (1999–2003, 2006–2011, 2017)
- Emil Werstler – lead guitar (2012–2014), bass (2010–2011; touring), live rhythm guitar (2009)
- Sean Zatorsky – keyboards, electronics, backing vocals (2011–2014)
- Jeremy Creamer – bass (2012–2014)
- Matt Szlachta – rhythm guitar (2012–2014)

== Discography ==
=== Studio albums ===
List of studio albums, with selected chart positions
Title	Album details	Peak chart positions									
Title	Album details	US	US Hard Rock	AUS	AUT	BEL (WA)	FIN	FRA	GER	NLD	UK
Pass Out of Existence	Released: October 2, 2001 (US); Label: Roadrunner; Formats: CD, LP, digital download	—	—	—	—	—	—	—	—	—	—
The Impossibility of Reason	Released: May 13, 2003 (US); Label: Roadrunner; Formats: CD, digital download	117	—	—	—	—	—	—	—	—	133
Chimaira	Released: August 9, 2005 (US); Label: Roadrunner; Formats: CD, LP, digital download	74	—	45	—	—	—	69	60	97	62
Resurrection	Released: March 6, 2007 (US); Label: Ferret, Nuclear Blast; Formats: CD, LP, digital download	42	—	79	58	—	—	104	71	99	76
The Infection	Released: April 21, 2009 (US); Label: Ferret, Nuclear Blast; Formats: CD, LP, digital download	30	4	81	71	97	32	109	85	—	155
The Age of Hell	Released: August 16, 2011 (US); Label: eOne; Formats: CD, LP, digital download	54	3	—	—	—	—	—	—	—	—
Crown of Phantoms	Released: July 30, 2013 (US); Label: eOne; Formats: CD, LP, digital download	52	4	86	—	—	—	—	—	—	—
"—" denotes a recording that did not chart or was not released in that territory.

=== Extended plays ===
List of extended plays
Title	Album details
This Present Darkness	Released: January 11, 2000 (US); Label: East Coast Empire; Formats: CD
The Age of Remix Hell	Released: December 24, 2011 (US); Label: eOne; Formats: Digital download

=== Singles ===
List of singles, showing year released and album name
Title	Year	Album
"Down Again"	2003	The Impossibility of Reason
"Eyes of a Criminal"	2005	The Impossibility of Reason
"Nothing Remains"	2005	Chimaira
"Resurrection"	2007	Resurrection
"Secrets of the Dead"	2009	The Infection
"Wild Thing"	2011	Non-album single
"Trigger Finger"	2011	The Age of Hell
"Born in Blood"	2011	The Age of Hell
"The Age of Hell"	2011	The Age of Hell
"All That's Left Is Blood"	2013	Crown of Phantoms
"No Mercy"	2013	Crown of Phantoms

=== Guest appearances ===
List of non-single guest appearances, showing year released and album name
Title	Year	Album
"Fascination Street"	2000	Disintegrated: A Tribute to the Cure
"Balls to the Wall"	2001	ECW Anarchy Rocks: Extreme Music, Vol. 2
"Army of Me"	2003	Freddy vs. Jason soundtrack
"Threnody"	2006	Masters of Horror, Vol. 2 soundtrack
"Paralyzed"	2007	Resident Evil: Extinction soundtrack
"Warpath"	2009	Saw VI soundtrack

=== Music videos ===
Year	Title	Director
2002	"Sp Lit"	Todd Bell
2003	"Pure Hatred"	Todd Bell
2003	"Down Again"	P. R. Brown
2004	"Power Trip"	Lex Halaby
2005	"Nothing Remains"	Shane Drake
2006	"Save Ourselves"	
2007	"Resurrection"	Todd Bell
2009	"Destroy and Dominate"	Todd Bell
2011	"Year of the Snake"	
2013	"All That's Left Is Blood"	
2013	"No Mercy"	
2014	"Wrapped in Violence"	Alex Morgan
2014	"Crown of Phantoms"	Alex Morgan

=== Video albums ===
List of video albums
Title	Album details
The Dehumanizing Process	Released: October 26, 2004 (US); Label: Roadrunner; Formats: DVD
Coming Alive	Released: July 20, 2010 (US); Label: Ferret, Nuclear Blast; Formats: DVD, CD, digital download
