= Crown of Phantoms =

Studio album by Chimaira
- Released: July 30, 2013
- Genre: Metalcore, nu metal
- Length: 44:23
- Label: eOne
- Producer: Ben Schigel

Chimaira chronology
The Age of Hell (2011)	Crown of Phantoms (2013)

Singles from Crown of Phantoms
- 1. "All That's Left Is Blood" Released: May 16, 2013; 2. "No Mercy" Released: June 18, 2013

Professional ratings
Review scores
Source	Rating
AllMusic	3.5/5 stars
Laut.de	2/5 stars
Metal Hammer UK	3.5/5 stars
Revolver	3/5 stars
Rock Hard	6/10

Crown of Phantoms is the seventh album by the American metal band Chimaira. It was released on July 30, 2013, via record label E1 Music. It is the first and only Chimaira album to feature Austin D'Amond, Jeremy Creamer, Sean Zatorsky, Emil Werstler, and Matt Szlachta, who all joined the band during 2011 and 2012 and left the band in September 2014.

== Release ==
On April 18, 2013, Chimaira announced their seventh studio album, Crown of Phantoms, along with a release date of July 30, 2013. The band also announced an Indiegogo crowdfunding campaign for the release of their album. Contributions for the campaign would fund a Fan Edition CD/DVD version of album which included additional tracks, a documentary, and other exclusive features. The campaign was successfully funded on June 2, 2013. On June 4, 2013, the band revealed the album's track listing and cover artwork.

On May 14, 2013, Chimaira released the album's first single, "All That's Left Is Blood", along with an accompanying music video. A second single, "No Mercy", and music video was released on June 18, 2013. The album reached position 52 on the Billboard 200 charts on its first week of release, selling around 7,400 copies and 1,800 on the second week. This was improvement from the previous album's debut at No. 54.

Crown of Phantoms was included into the list of "Axl Rosenberg's Top Fifteen Metal Albums of 2013" according to MetalSucks.

== Recording and production ==
"Crown Of Phantoms is the culmination of three years of going through tons of changes, harsh realities but also excitement. It's something brand new and when you put all those things together you get Crown Of Phantoms as a result. These are exciting times for the band and it’s the polar opposite of where I was with the band two years ago."

— Mark Hunter

The album was produced and mixed by Ben Schigel at Spider Studios, and mastered by Dan Millice at Engine Room Audio in New York City.

== Track listing ==
No.	Title	Length
1.	"The Machine"	4:01
2.	"No Mercy"	4:34
3.	"All That's Left Is Blood"	3:17
4.	"I Despise"	3:46
5.	"Plastic Wonderland"	5:04
6.	"The Transmigration"	2:26
7.	"Crown of Phantoms"	3:58
8.	"Spineless"	3:17
9.	"Kings of the Shadow World"	5:22
10.	"Wrapped in Violence"	4:22
11.	"Love Soaked Death"	4:16
Total length:		44:23

Fan Edition bonus tracks
No.	Title	Length
12.	"New Apocalypse"	3:31
13.	"The Dehumanizing Process (Slow & Low 2013 Mix)"	4:26
14.	"Outshined" (Soundgarden cover)	4:42
15.	"Wrapped in Violence (Allinaline Mix)"	3:15
16.	"All That's Left Is Blood" (Live in Huntington, New York)	3:13
17.	"I Despise" (Demo)	4:12
18.	"No Mercy" (Demo)	4:35
Total length:		71:30

== Personnel ==
Chimaira

- Mark Hunter – lead vocals
- Austin D'Amond – drums
- Sean Zatorsky – keyboards, synthesizers, backing vocals
- Emil Werstler – lead guitar
- Jeremy Creamer – bass
- Matt Szlachta – rhythm guitar

Additional musicians

- Steve Basil – piano on "King of the Shadow World"

Production

- Patrick Finegan – artwork, art direction
- Scott Givens – A&R
- Dan Millice – mastering
- Ben Schigel – production, engineering, mixing
- Mark Lewis, Jim Stewart, Tony Gammalo – producers (assistant)
- Ben Hostetler – engineering (assistant)
- Recorded and mixed at Spider Studios (Cleveland, Ohio, United States)
- Guitars re-amped at Audiohammer Studios (Orlando, Florida, United States)
- Mastered at Engine Room Audio (New York City, United States)

== Charts ==
Chart performance for Crown of Phantoms
Chart (2013)	Peak position
UK Rock & Metal Albums (Official Charts)	18
US Billboard 200	52
US Top Album Sales (Billboard)	52
US Top Hard Rock Albums (Billboard)	4
US Top Rock Albums (Billboard)	10
US Independent Albums (Billboard)	8
