= The Age of Hell =

Studio album by Chimaira
- Released: August 16, 2011
- Recorded: 2011
- Genre: Groove metal
- Length: 49:50
- Label: E1 Music
- Producers: Ben Schigel; Mark Hunter; Rob Arnold

Chimaira chronology
The Infection (2009)	The Age of Hell (2011)	Crown of Phantoms (2013)

Singles from The Age of Hell
- 1. "Trigger Finger" Released: June 17, 2011; 2. "Born in Blood" Released: June 17, 2011; 3. "The Age of Hell/Year of the Snake" Released: March 27, 2012

Professional ratings
Review scores
Source	Rating
AllMusic	3.5/5 stars
CraveOnline	6.5/10
Loud	90%
Metal Arcade	5/5 stars
Metal.de	8/10
Metalholic	9.3/10
The New Review	4.5/5 stars
Revolver	4/5 stars

The Age of Hell is the sixth studio album by American heavy metal band Chimaira. The album was released on August 16, 2011. The album sold more than 7,000 copies in the United States in its first week of release to debut at position No. 54 on the Billboard 200 chart. In an interview, the band stated they have filmed a music video. On August 10, 2011, the official video for "Year of the Snake" was released. The DVD that was released through a Hot Topic edition featured a 50-minute interview with the new line up, no music videos were featured.

== Critical reception ==
In a review for AllMusic, critic reviewer Dave Donnelly wrote: "Drummer Andols Herrick, keyboardist Chris Spicuzza, and bassist Jim LaMarca left the Ohio metal band in the preceding months, leaving vocalist Mark Hunter to cover keyboards and guitarist Rob Arnold to take over bass duties while producer Ben Schigel deputized on drums. What's remarkable is how little an effect the stated departures had on the sound of the album. It's a very smooth and seamless transition from 2009's The Infection - so much so that it's not immediately obvious that anything has changed." Rick Bakker of Metal Arcade called the album "a definite return to form for Chimaira. It's the sound of a band that has regained its confidence, learned from their mistakes and secured its foothold in the metal landscape."

== Track listing ==
All tracks are written by Rob Arnold, Mark Hunter and Ben Schigel, except where noted.

The Age of Hell track listing
No.	Title	Length
1.	"The Age of Hell"	3:32
2.	"Clockwork"	3:43
3.	"Losing My Mind"	4:57
4.	"Time Is Running Out"	4:13
5.	"Year of the Snake"	3:41
6.	"Beyond the Grave"	4:54
7.	"Born in Blood" (Rob Arnold, Mark Hunter, Ben Schigel, Phil Bozeman)	4:08
8.	"Stoma"	1:28
9.	"Powerless"	4:31
10.	"Trigger Finger"	3:54
11.	"Scapegoat"	4:32
12.	"Samsara" (featuring Emil Werstler of Dååth)	6:12
Total length:		49:50

Collector's edition/iTunes bonus tracks
No.	Title	Length
13.	"Scum of the Earth"	5:03
14.	"Your Days Are Numbered"	3:02
15.	"Clockwork" (Remix)	4:20
16.	"Wild Thing" (Chip Taylor cover)	2:29
Total length:		64:04

== Personnel ==
Chimaira

- Mark Hunter – vocals, keyboards, samples
- Rob Arnold – guitars, bass
- Ben Schigel – drums

Additional musicians

- Tony Gammalo – bass guitar on "Beyond the Grave"
- Emil Werstler – additional guitar solo on "Samsara", additional keyboards and samples
- Phil Bozeman – additional vocals on "Born in Blood"
- Patrick Finegan, Lauren Dupont, Vincent DiFranco – additional keyboards and samples
- Kalam Muttalib – saxophone on "Clockwork", additional keyboards and samples
- Austin D'amond – drums (16)
- Emil Werstler – guitar (16)
- Sean Z – keyboards (16)

Production

- Ben Schigel – producer
- Mark Hunter – producer
- Tony Gammalo – additional production
- Rob Arnold – additional production
- Zeuss – mixing, mastering at Planet Z Studios
- Garrett Zunt – artwork, design
- Todd Bell – additional artwork, art direction

== Charts ==
Chart performance for The Age of Hell
Chart (2011)	Peak position
US Billboard 200	54
US Independent Albums (Billboard)	5
US Top Rock Albums (Billboard)	9
US Top Hard Rock Albums (Billboard)	3
US Indie Store Album Sales (Billboard)	24
