= Mark Hunter (musician) =

American singer (born 1977)

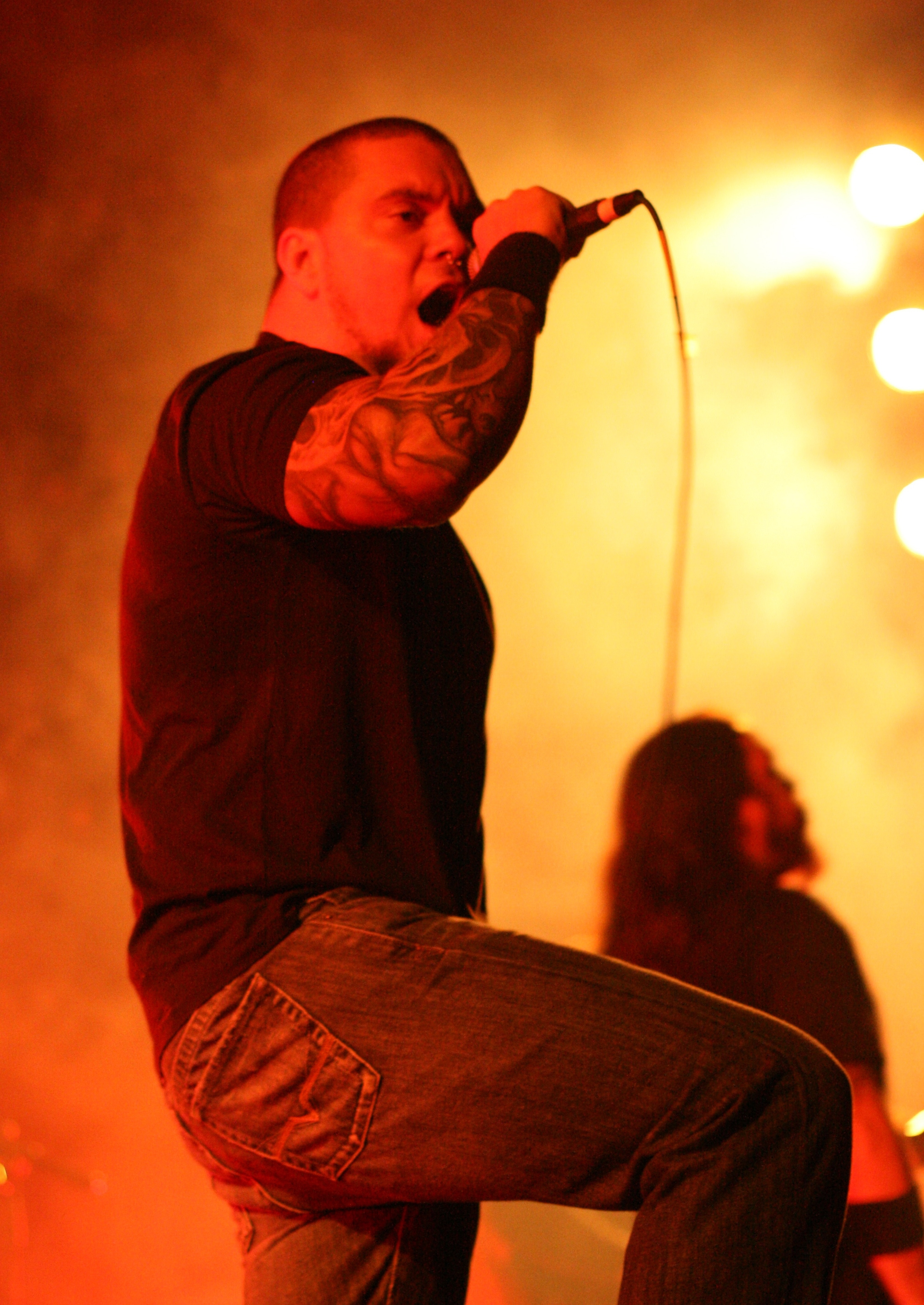
- Hunter performing with Chimaira in 2008

Background information
- Also known as: Metal Moses
- Born: May 26, 1977 (age 49); Parma Heights, Ohio, U.S.
- Genres: Groove metal, metalcore, nu metal
- Occupations: Singer, songwriter
- Years active: 1998–present
- Member of: Chimaira

Mark Hunter (born May 26, 1977) is an American musician best known as the lead vocalist of heavy metal band Chimaira.

== Early life ==
Hunter was born in Parma Heights, Ohio, on May 26, 1977.

== Career ==
Hunter started Chimaira in 1998. The band has sold over a million albums worldwide and have debuted on the Billboard 200 Chart six times. 2013's Crown of Phantoms debuted at number 54 selling over 7,400 copies in its first week of release. Hunter was one of the main songwriters for Chimaira and considered the band leader. He is also credited in the album liner notes for assisting with guitars, artwork concepts and album production.

He was the only original member of Chimaira after departures in 2010 and 2011. Cleveland Scene nicknamed Hunter "Metal Moses" in 2002 for his popularization of the Wall of Death

== Influences ==
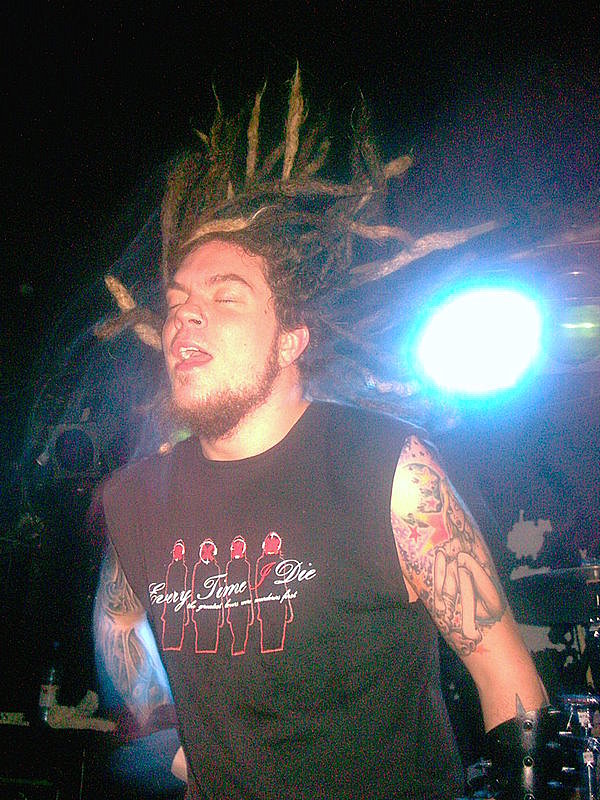
Hunter in 2004

Hunter has cited Stanley Kubrick, Gaspar Noé, Trent Reznor, and Slayer to be among some of his influences. Some inspiration for lyrical content was drawn from Hunter's love of movies. Beyond the Black Rainbow, Fire Walk with Me, and The Shining have been mentioned in numerous interviews.

== Personal life ==
Hunter practiced Muay Thai and was featured in the July 2008 edition of Fight! Magazine, and the April 2009 edition of MMA Weekly.

Chimaira and director Nick Cavalier released the documentary Down Again in 2018, in which Hunter shares his struggle with bipolar disorder as well as his interest in photography.

Hunter was diagnosed with thyroid cancer but is now in remission after a full thyroidectomy.

=== Writing and blogs ===
Hunter wrote regular columns for Revolver magazine and GunShyAssassin. Some of topics included meditation, travel, and nutrition. He also penned the liner notes for The Best of Mercyful Fate.

=== Social media ===
In 2011, Hunter took to his Twitter and Facebook accounts to discuss his frustration with the music industry resulting in praise from fellow musicians and journalists.

- Metal Sucks – Why You Should Be Following Mark Hunter
- "misconception"-of-the-music-industry Metal Insider – Mark Hunter Discusses His Twitter Outburst

== Discography ==
=== Chimaira ===
- This Present Darkness EP
- Pass Out of Existence
- The Impossibility of Reason
- Freddy vs. Jason (soundtrack)
- Chimaira
- Resurrection
- The Infection
- Coming Alive
- The Age of Hell
- Crown of Phantoms

=== Previous bands and guest work ===
- Guitarist and vocalist for hardcore band Skipline (1995–1997)
- Guitarist for stoner rock band High Point (2003)
- Guitarist for The Demonic Knights of Aberosh
- Backing vocals on "In the Face of the Faceless" by Forever in Terror on the album Restless in the Tides
- Vocals on "13 Years" by Stemm on the album Songs for the Incurable Heart
- Vocals on "The Enemy" on the album Roadrunner United
- Vocals on "Mask of the Damned" by The Elite on the World War 3 EP
- Vocals on "Faith Destroyed" by Excellent Cadaver on the album Faith Destroyed
- Vocals on "Desert Dread" by Ghost Iris on the album Comatose
- Vocals on "Parasite" by Bleed the Sky for their newest single. (02-2023)

=== Production credits ===
- The Impossibility of Reason (co-producer)
- Chimaira
- The Infection (co-producer)
- The Age of Hell (co-producer)
- Crown of Phantoms DVD (assistant camera/editor)
