= List of Columbia College Chicago people =

The following is a partial list of notable alumni and faculty of Columbia College Chicago.

== Notable alumni ==
- Scott Adsit (1987) – actor on 30 Rock
- Chester Alamo-Costello (1998) – artist and photographer
- Melissa Albert (2006) – author of young adult fiction
- Monroe Anderson, journalist, author, was Chicago's press secretary for mayor Eugene Sawyer
- Hettie Barnhill (2006) – dancer in 2009 Broadway production of Fela!
- Anna Brunner – vocalist for the metal bands Exit Eden and League of Distortion
- Aidy Bryant (2009) – former cast member of Saturday Night Live
- Mickie Caspi (1982) – artist
- Nick Charles – sports broadcaster
- Chris Coates (journalist) (2004) - journalist
- Olivia A. Cole – (2011) author and teacher
- Common (attended briefly) – rapper, actor, author
- Chet Coppock (1971) – sports commentator for WLS radio
- Greg Corner – musician, bass player of Kill Hannah, musical director and co-host of JBTV
- Shea Coulee (2011) – drag queen and contestant on RuPaul's Drag Race
- David Cromer (attended briefly; award-winning director of Adding Machine)
- Charlie Curtis-Beard – rapper and TikTok personality
- Jeffrey Daniels – author and poet
- Brant Daugherty (2008) – actor
- Andy Dick – actor (attended briefly)
- Phyllis Diller – comedian and actress
- Jimmy Dore – stand-up comedian, former political commentator for The Young Turks, host of The Jimmy Dore Show
- Bruce DuMont (1969) – broadcaster
- Aiden English (2010) – professional wrestler
- Elaine Equi – poet
- Deitra Farr – blues singer
- Danny Fenster (2009) – journalist, editor of Frontier Myanmar
- Mauro Fiore (1987) – Academy Award-winning cinematographer (Avatar, The Island, Tears of the Sun, Training Day)
- Kathleen Flinn (1989) – New York Times best-selling author
- Paul Garnes – producer of Selma, QueenSugar, The Game
- Greg Glienna – director and screenwriter
- Michael Goi (1980) – cinematographer
- Kevin Gosztola (2010) – journalist, writer, and documentarian
- Shecky Greene (1946) – comedian and actor
- Chester Gregory (1995) – actor, Broadway productions of Tarzan, Cry Baby, and Dreamgirls
- Michael Grothaus (2000) – novelist, author of Epiphany Jones
- John Guleserian – cinematographer
- Hal Haenel (1981) – senior vice president of 20th Century Fox
- Larry Heinemann (1971) – novelist, author of Paco's Story
- David Heinz (2002) – film editor
- Isabella Hofmann – actor
- Erica Hubbard (1999) – actor on Lincoln Heights
- Andrew Huebner (1998) – Emmy Award-winning television producer with Nickelodeon Animation Studios
- Chase Infiniti (2022) – actress
- Jeremih (2009) – singer
- Rashid Johnson (2000) – photographer
- Janusz Kamiński (1982–87) – Academy Award-winning cinematographer for Schindler's List, Saving Private Ryan
- John Kass – columnist
- Kid Sister (2004) – recording artist
- Kyle Kinane (2002) – comedian
- J. A. Konrath – writer of the Jack Daniels mystery series
- Tina La Porta (1989) – digital artist
- Laura Les – music producer, singer and songwriter, half of experimental electronic duo 100 gecs
- Jake Lloyd – actor, played Anakin Skywalker in Star Wars film
- Josefina Lopez (1991) – author of Real Women Have Curves
- Becky Lynch – professional wrestler
- Shane Madej (2009) – founder of Watcher Entertainment, filmmaker, writer, producer
- Liz Mandeville – blues musician, singer, songwriter, music producer, record label owner
- Jason Marnocha – voice actor
- The Mazeking – contemporary visual artist
- Kym Mazelle – singer and actress
- Chris McKay – animator, film and television director, editor and producer
- Austin P. McKenzie – actor
- Joe Meno (1997) – author
- Sharon Mesmer (1983) – poet, author
- Michelle Monaghan – actress, Gone Baby Gone, Mission: Impossible III
- Ozier Muhammad (1972) – Pulitzer Prize-winning photojournalist for The New York Times
- Bob Odenkirk – writer for Saturday Night Live (1987–1995), actor (Breaking Bad, Better Call Saul)
- Lola Omolola – journalist
- Anita Padilla (1991) – reporter for FOX Chicago
- Diane Pathieu (2001) – weekend news anchor for WLS-TV in Chicago
- Steve Pink – actor, screenwriter and director
- Tonya Pinkins (1996) – Tony Award-winning actress
- Laura Post – voice actress
- Mark Protosevich (1983) – screenwriter of I Am Legend, Poseidon, The Cell
- Aidan Quinn – actor, Elementary, Legends of the Fall
- Declan Quinn (1979) – cinematographer
- Matthew Rehwoldt (2010) – professional wrestler
- Rob Renzetti – animator and creator of My Life as a Teenage Robot
- Dean Richards – reporter and broadcaster (1976)
- Andy Richter (1988) – actor, sidekick on Conan
- Alexander Rybak (2022) – winner of 2009 Eurovision
- Saba (attended briefly) – rapper, record producer
- Pat Sajak (1968) – host of Wheel of Fortune
- Marcus Sakey – best-selling author
- Ken Seng (1999) - cinematographer
- Anna D. Shapiro – theater director and Steppenwolf ensemble member
- Drew Shiflett (1974) – mixed media artist and sculptor
- Silver Sphere (1999) – singer-songwriter
- Bob Sirott (1971) – broadcaster
- Matt Skiba – musician, lead singer and guitarist of Alkaline Trio
- Coyla May Spring – Chautauqua dramatic reader, singer, pianist
- Michael Stahl-David (2005) – actor, Cloverfield, The Black Donnellys
- Dino Stamatopoulos – comedy writer
- Greg Stimac (2005) – artist
- Mike Stoklasa – director, actor, and creator of RedLetterMedia
- Sumanth (1996) – film actor/producer
- Genndy Tartakovsky (1990) – creator of Dexter's Laboratory, Samurai Jack, Sym-Bionic Titan
- Norman Teague – American designer and educator
- Robert Teitel (1990) – producer of Men of Honor, Barbershop, Notorious
- George Tillman, Jr. (1991) – director of Men of Honor, Barbershop, Notorious
- Glenna Smith Tinnin (1897) – women's suffrage leader and theater professional
- Christian Sprenger (2007) – cinematographer and television producer
- Nadine Velazquez (2001) – actress in The League
- Jim Verraros – dance musician and actor
- Jordan Vogt-Roberts (2006) – film and television director
- Lena Waithe – actress, producer, and screenwriter of Master of None
- Ryley Walker – singer-songwriter and guitarist
- Frank Waln (2014) – Sicangu Lakota Native American rapper and activist
- Sam Weller – (1990) author, biographer
- Jon Wellner – actor, CSI 1997
- Francis White (2007) – musician
- Jim Williams – broadcaster

== Faculty ==
† denotes former faculty member

- Stephen T. Asma – writer
- Martin Atkins – musician
- Dawoud Bey – photographer
- Pauline Brailsford †
- Gwendolyn Brooks – first African American to receive a Pulitzer Prize †
- Ivan Brunetti – sequential artist
- Jim DeRogatis – music critic, co-host of Sound Opinions
- Phyllis Eisenstein – fantasy and science fiction novelist
- Jan Erkert – choreographer, teacher and writer
- Ed Ferrara – television writer
- Charles "Chuck" Harrison
- Larry Heinemann †
- Aleksandar Hemon – writer
- Andy Herren – winner, Big Brother 15
- Joe Meno – author
- Edward L. Morris † – journalist, CEO, president of Chicago chapter of the National Academy of Television Arts and Sciences, executive at Grant Broadcasting
- Audrey Niffenegger – author
- Sheldon Patinkin †
- Melissa Potter – interdisciplinary artist
- William Russo – musician
- John Schultz – writer
- Gordon A. Sheehan – animator †
- Smino – rapper (attended briefly)
- David Trinidad
- Karen Volkman – poet
- Sam Weller – journalist and author
- Donda West – musician †
- John H. White – photojournalist
