= Blue Lightning =

Blue Lightning may refer to:

- The Blue Lightning, a 1986 Australian film
- Blue Lightning (1989 video game), an Atari video game for the Lynx console
- Blue Lightning (1995 video game), an Atari video game for the Jaguar console
- IBM 486DLC (Blue Lightning), an improved version of the IBM 386SLC
- Blue Lightning (Evan K album), 2016
- Blue Lightning (Yngwie Malmsteen album), 2019
- "Blue Lightning", a 2022 song by Big Thief from the album Dragon New Warm Mountain I Believe in You
- "Blue Lightning", a 2010 crime novel by Ann Cleeves from her 'Shetland/Jimmy Perez' series, which was later adapted into the "Shetland" (TV Series)
- The Blue Lightning Initiative (BLI), a US federal program training aviation personnel to identify and report cases of human trafficking.
