= Enemy Inside =

German metal band

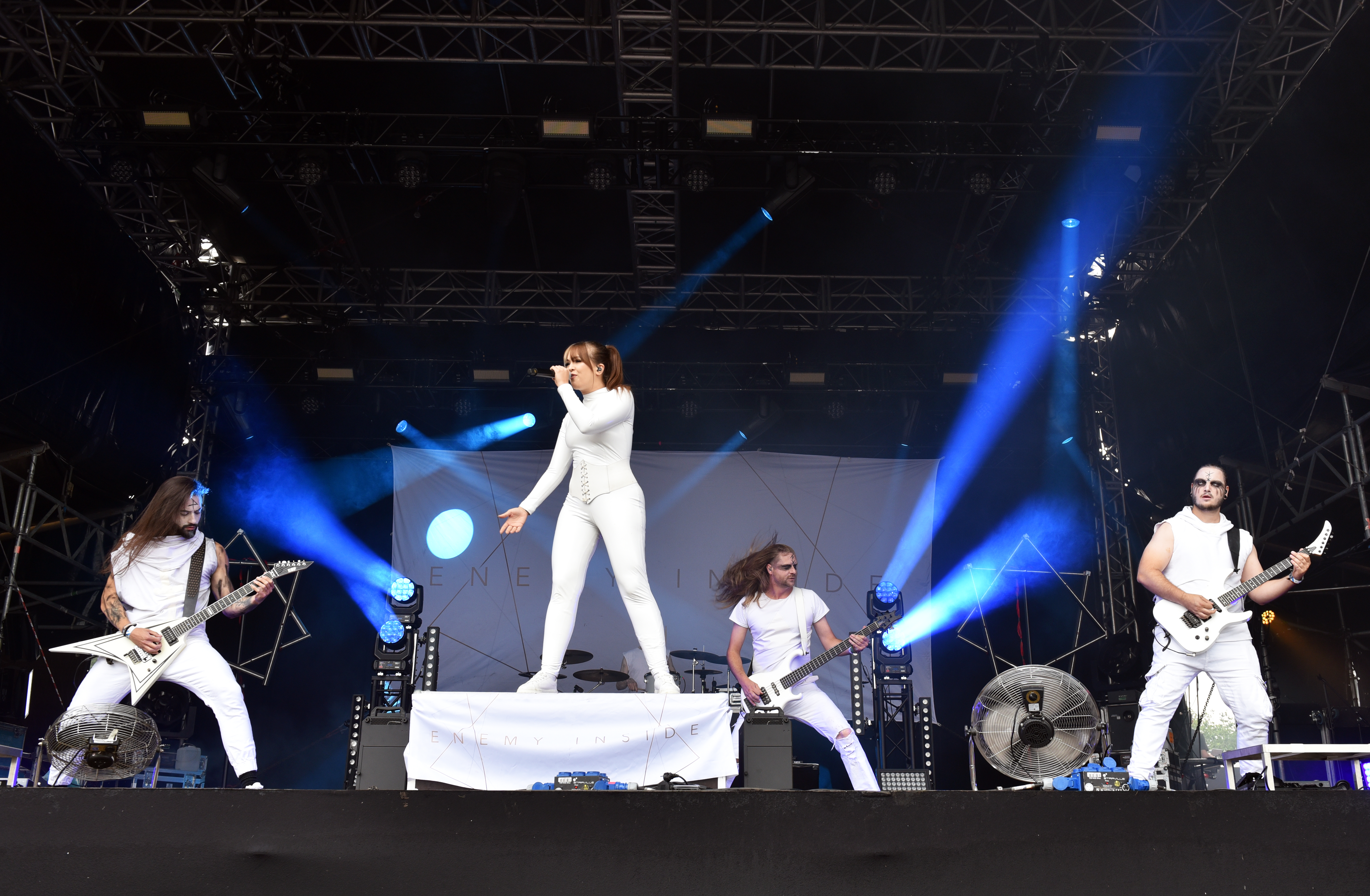
- Enemy Inside performing at Wacken Open Air 2023

Background information
- Origin: Aschaffenburg, Germany
- Genres: Alternative metal, symphonic metal
- Years active: 2017–present
- Label: Reigning Phoenix Music
- Members: Nastassja Giulia; Evan K David Hadarick; Dominik Stotzem; Hanno Kerstan
- Past members: Fabian Dührssen; Felix Keith
- Website: enemy-inside.com

Enemy Inside is a German metal band formed in Aschaffenburg in 2017.

== Background ==
The band was formed by singer Nastassja Giulia and guitar player Evan K (Mystic Prophecy, Exit Eden, ex-Cypecore) who have found their own sound, somewhere between dark rock and modern metal, through a wide range of musical experimentation. Their music strikes hard guitar riffs with melodic vocals and melodic guitar solos.

In June 2018, Enemy Inside announced their debut album Phoenix to be released by ROAR in September 2018.

In August 2018, the band released their first singles & video clips "Falling Away", "Oblivion" and "Lullaby" on YouTube.

Georg Neuhauser, the singer of the symphonic/progressive power metal band Serenity, appears also as a guest and performs alongside Giulia on the song "Doorway to Salvation". The album reached after few days of its release Nr.28 in the German iTunes Metal Top releases and Nr.74 in the US.

In August 2021 the band has released its second album "Seven" and reached #93 of the German Downloadscharts and was positioned within the Top Releases in many countries.

In February 2025, the band released their third album "Venom" through Reigning Phoenix Music. Additionally, Hanno Kerstan was confirmed as the band's permanent drummer.

== Band members ==
Current members

- Nastassja Giulia – lead vocals (2017-present)
- Evan K – lead guitar (2017-present) (Mystic Prophecy, Exit Eden)
- David Hadarick – rhythm guitar (2017-present)
- Dominik Stotzem – bass guitar (2017-present) (ex-Beyond The Bridge)
- Hanno Kerstan – drums (2025-present)

Former members

- Fabian Dührssen - drums (2022 - 2023)
- Felix Keith – drums (2017–2021) (ex-Aloha from Hell)

Enemy Inside at Rockharz Open Air 2022

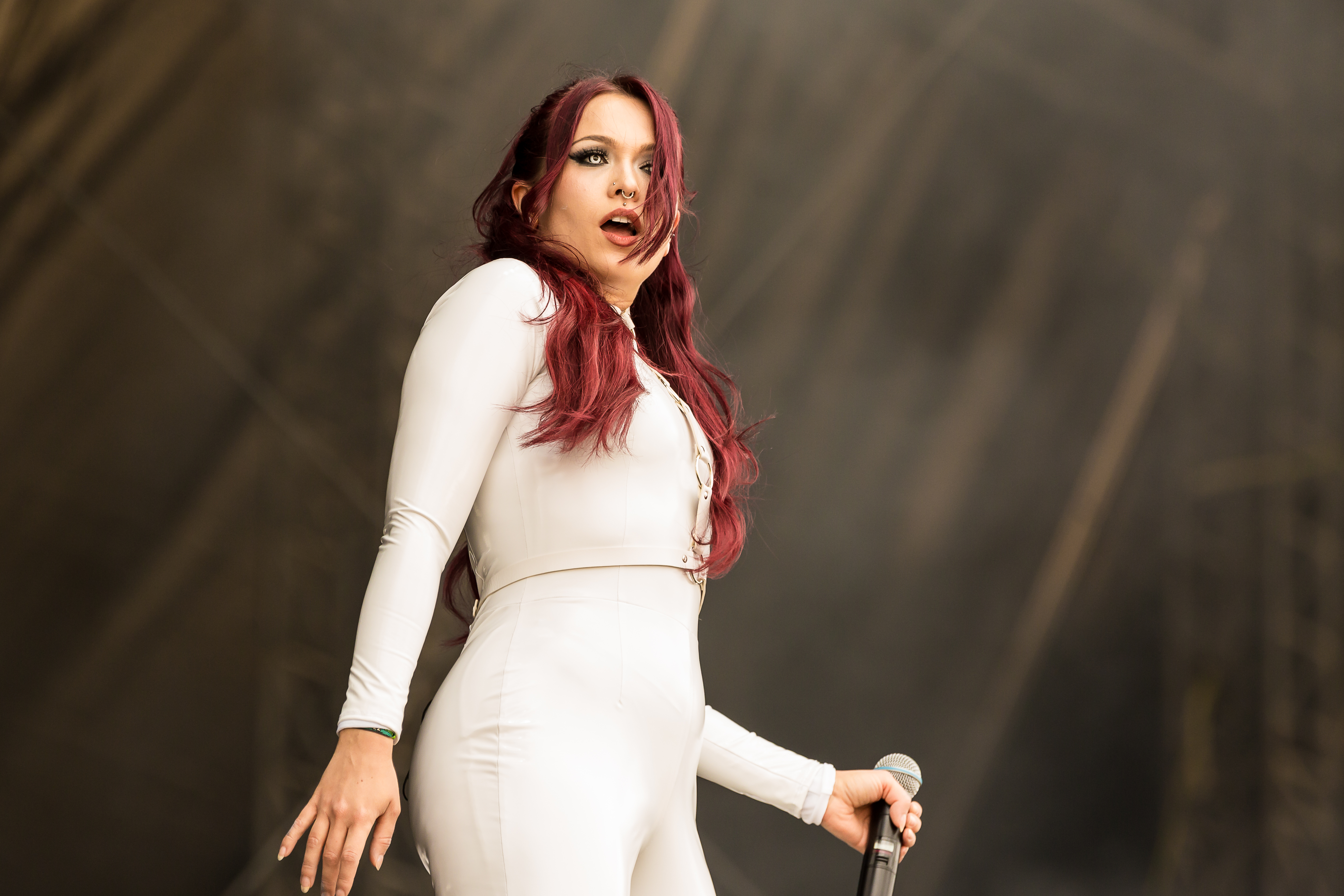
Nastassja Giulia

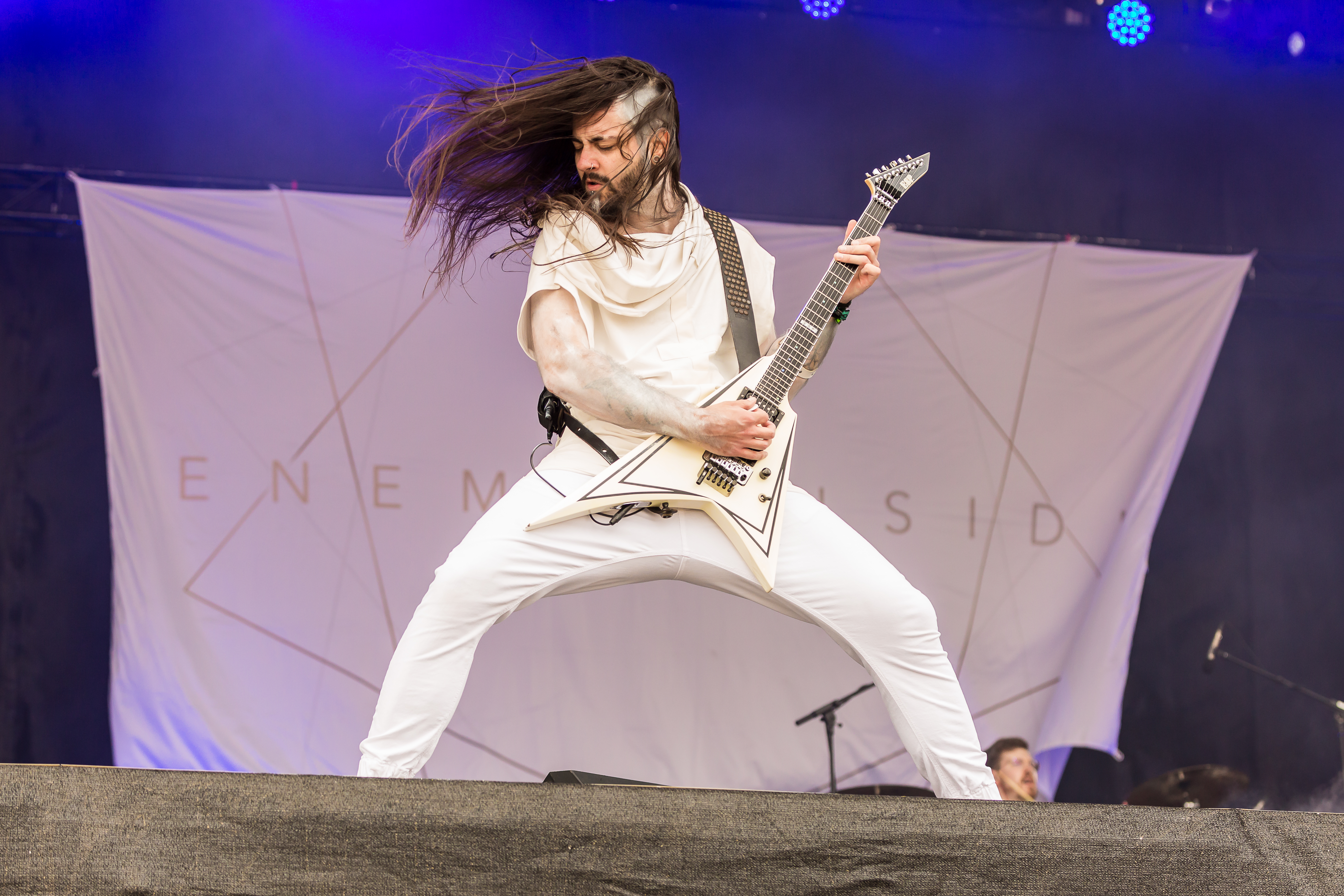
Evan K

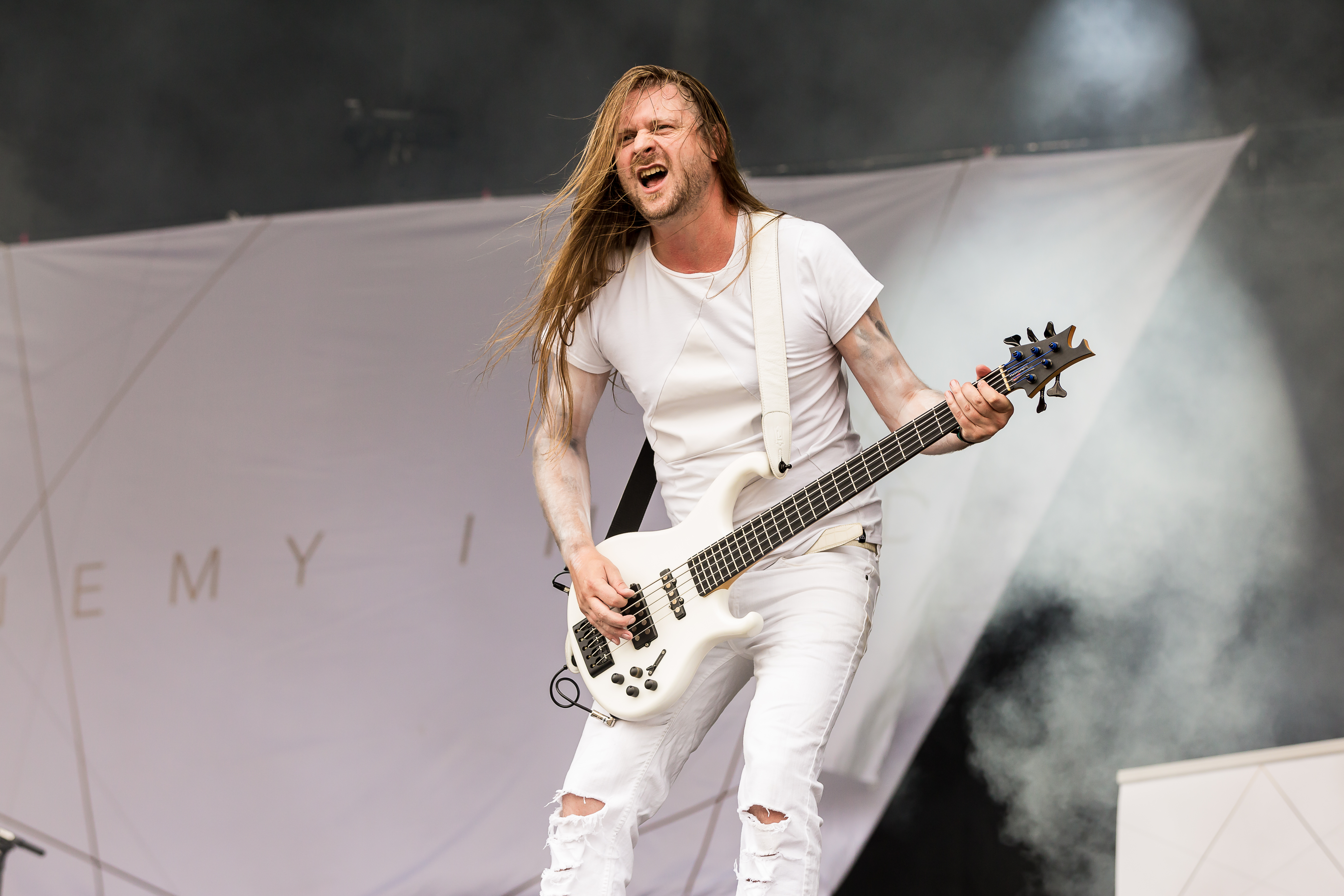
Dominik Stotzem

== Discography ==
Singles

- Falling Away (2018)
- Oblivion (2018)
- Lullaby (2018)
- Phoenix (2019)
- Dark Skies (2019)
- Doorway to Salvation (2019)
- Crystallize (2021)
- Alien (2021)
- Release Me (2021)
- Black Butterfly (2021)
- In My Blood (2021)
- What We Used to Be (2024)
- Sayonara (2024)
- Should Have Known Better (2024)
- Fuck That Party (feat: Zak Tell) (2024)
- Don't Call Me An Angel (2024)
- Dirt On My Name (feat: Mirza Radonjica) (2025)
- Venom (2025)
- Innocent (2025)
- R.I.P. (2026)
- Dopamine (2026)

Studio albums

- Phoenix (2018)
- Seven (2021)
- Venom (2025)

== Videography ==
- Dark Skies (2019)
- Phoenix (2019)
- Doorway To Salvation (2019)
- Falling Away (2018)
- Oblivion (2018)
- Lullaby (2018)
- Crystallize (2021)
- Alien (2021)
- Release Me (2021)
- Black Butterfly (2021)
- In My Blood (2021)
- What We Used To Be (2024)
- Sayonara (2024)
- Don't Call Me An Angel (2024)
- Dirt On My Name (2025)
- Venom (2025)
- Innocent (2025)
- R.I.P. (2026)
- Dopamine (2026)
