= Chester Alamo-Costello =

American artist, publisher

- Born: 1967 (age 58–59); Indianapolis, Indiana, US
- Education: Columbia College Chicago, Herron School of Art and Design
- Known for: Photography, site-specific art, public art, publishing, teaching
- Website: Alamo-Costello Archive

Chester Alamo-Costello (born 1967) is an American artist, educator, publisher and writer based in Chicago, Illinois. He is known for his international "Art Drop" series (1998–present), which places art into non-traditional settings such as public parks, and for photographic books that have been noted for their rawness and everyday immediacy. He has exhibited widely in the public domain in Europe, the United States and Canada, as well as at the Museum of Contemporary Photography and Hyde Park Art Center. His photography and projects have been reviewed or published in the Chicago Sun-Times, Chicago Tribune Magazine, De Telegraaf (Amsterdam), The Globe and Mail (Canada), New Art Examiner, Museum of Contemporary Art Chicago Magazine, Nerve, and on Chicago Public Radio. His books of photography, art and writing include: Somewhere In-Between Chicago (2018), The Globe (2010), and Grandpa Danny (2008).

Alamo-Costello is also the publisher of, and a contributor to, The COMP Magazine, a digital art and design journal. He is a professor in the Department of Art and Design at the University of St. Francis in Joliet, Illinois and at Sichuan University of Science and Engineering in Zigong, China.

Chester Alamo-Costello, "New Agenda Art Drops" (Series 1, details); left, Giardini Pubblici Indro Montanelli, Milan, Italy, May 18, 2011; right, New Street Agenda Art Drop (White Devil), Series 1, 2007.

== Early life and career ==
Alamo-Costello was born Michael Christopher Costello in 1967 in Indianapolis to a blue-collar family of German, Irish, and Italian immigrants that valued practical skills. After developing an interest in art and graduating from Southport High School, he studied graphic design, painting and photography at the Herron School of Art and Design at IUPUI in Indianapolis (BFA, 1990). He moved to Chicago in 1993, and initially photographed artists, musicians, and transients while living in a warehouse district on the city's South Side, near Chinatown. In 1994, he enrolled in graduate school at Columbia College Chicago (MFA, 1998), where he studied with photographers Bob Thall and Melissa Ann Pinney, and painter Corey Postiglione. He began his teaching career at Columbia, before moving to the University of St. Francis in 1999. Alamo-Costello lives and works in Chicago with wife, Sandy.

== Work ==
Armpit, Urban Totems (Installation detail), 1400 South Wabash Avenue, Chicago, Illinois, August 5–November 15, 1994.

Although Alamo-Costello's work has included drawings, painting and journals, his artistic practice primarily lies in two areas: art-related public interventions, performances and social experiments that may be site-specific or placed in public space; and photographic series in which he often takes on the role of archivist or journalist, collecting and documenting everyday, contemporary experiences and encounters.

=== Public and ephemeral art and social experiments ===
Alamo-Costello has worked on a range of public, temporary and experimental projects that present artwork in non-traditional settings to "non-art" audiences and explore themes of ephemerality, randomness, communication, and trust. His first forays into this work came about as a founding member of "Armpit" (1992–8), a performance and public art group that included himself and artists Jesse Bercowetz, Nick Nuccio and Michael Plaza. Between 1993 and 1995, they embarked on three "art walks"—the longest, a 298-mile Chicago-to-St. Louis trip—wheeling carts of their own sculpture as a "roving street gallery" bringing contemporary art to communities and viewers that normally have little contact with it in their own environments. In 1994, they created a temporary display of large "urban drop-offs" or "urban totems" in empty Chicago city lots that they made from refuse (cinder blocks, hunks of concrete, scrap wood, tubes and old tires) found on-site. The Chicago Reader's Fred Camper described it as a "guerrilla installation" of "near-chaotic accretions" that "gains much from its relationship to the site, and from the social goals that made the group choose it."

==== "Art Drop" series ====
Alamo-Costello extended the urban drop-off concept with his "art drop" series (1998– ), an art-based social experiment that sought to break through the inaccessibility of art galleries and markets by introducing artworks in unexpected public places, thus involving a broader base of viewers in responding to and collecting art. For the first drop, "Searching for Geomantricks" (1998), Alamo-Costello created sixty 4 in × 5 in (100 mm × 130 mm) lightboxes with abstract color images inlaid in glass and encased in stained oak frames, which he placed in 20 Chicago public parks for passersby to find, keep and respond to; each was accompanied by a note describing the piece and project, a pen, and a self-addressed, stamped envelope for responding. The images, which resembled spider-like lairs, doubled as "puzzle" pieces that combined to form a large-scale image called Geomantrick's Blessing, which Alamo-Costello created by shooting sections of a string composition with a large format camera, varying exposure times, focus points and color balance.

Between 1999 and 2004, he produced "Appleseed International"—named for the American folk-hero, Johnny Appleseed—in which he distributed 280 similarly conceived works to 20 U.S. and 20 international city parks. For New Street Agenda (2005-2013), he created 280 framed graffiti-like prints that comment on contemporary modes of deceptive communication and distributed them in 80 international cities from St. Petersburg, Russia through Europe to the United States. Alamo-Costello has received responses from about 30% of the left pieces, from places as widespread as Edinburgh and Paris to Joliet, Illinois.

In 2000, Alamo-Costello produced “The Men Who Sold The World” with Scottish artist Donald McGhie, an interactive exhibition and performance at the Hyde Park Art Center that explored contemporary "savage" capitalism and aggressive marketing techniques in the guise of a "fly-by-night upstart company" willing to buy or sell anything. The show transformed the center into "an enterprise zone" including modern office cubicles, product displays, flashing lights, and money-themed imagery; performative elements—at the opening and a second performance—included aggressive entrepreneurs offering to buy ideas, telemarketing of cellphone users from across the room, a liquidation auction down to the walls, and a money giveaway in the street.

Chester Alamo-Costello, "Chelsea 1 – Barcelona 1, 2nd Leg" (two images), photographs, UEFA Champions League Semi Final, May 5, 2009. From The Globe, 2010.

=== Documentary photographic practice ===
Alamo-Costello has created distinct photographic series since 1993, produced throughout the Midwest and Europe, using an approach informed by art and documentary photographers such as Barbara Crane, Mitch Epstein, Walker Evans, Susan Meiselas, Daidō Moriyama, and August Sander. These series include "Chicago Portraits" (1993- ), depicting Chicago creatives, passersby, and neighborhoods; "7 Minutes SW of the Loop" (1996-2012), portraits and neighborhood studies of Chicago's near south side; "Street Notes" (1993- ), images of ephemeral street art, messages and signage; and "University" (2002- ), images taken at USF. Additional series have formed the basis of his three books.

Chester Alamo-Costello, Chicago Street, Vicinity of Damen Ave. and North Ave., photograph, Chicago, IL, 2012. From Somewhere In-Between Chicago, 2018.

Alamo-Costello's first sustained photographic subject was his grandfather, Danny Uberto, who he memorialized in his first book, Grandpa Danny (2008). The book combines sections compiling family mementos and snapshots, catalogued personal artifacts, and photos taken by Alamo-Costello; it was described as straddling the genres of fine arts monograph and personal visual tribute documenting a century of everyday life. His second book, The Globe (2010), also took on a personal subject: football (soccer) fan support at The Globe, a pub in Chicago's Northcenter neighborhood that Alamo-Costello frequented and documented over five years. The book was noted for its emotional universality, capturing in unpolished, snapshot-like compositions of "unusual rawness and immediacy," the interactions of fans, clubs, and televised contests.

Somewhere In-Between Chicago (2018–21) documents people (artists, musicians, commuters, passersby), places, architecture and experiences Alamo-Costello encountered in Chicago over a 25-year period—many compiled through over 170 artist/musician interviews and portraits—along with essays from four writers mirroring the city's diversity and energy. In 2021, he exhibited the project and book at the University of St. Francis Art Gallery, with support from an Illinois Arts Council Agency grant. Since 2023, Alamo-Costello's photographic work and research has focused on China, specifically portraits of art faculty, students and staff at Sichuan University of Science & Engineering where he has taught for part of each year since 2019. The work, which compares Chinese and U.S. teaching philosophies and practices, was supported in part by a Chicago Department of Cultural Affairs grant.

== Publishing and writing ==
Alamo-Costello launched The COMP Magazine, a digital publication focusing on art and design, in 2014 with Egzon Shaqiri. He remains the magazine's publisher and an active contributor. He has written articles about artists Kerry James Marshall, Moholy-Nagy, Frida Kahlo and Diego Rivera, the Japanese photography and performance movement “Provoke” and the Hairy Who, Chicago's underground music scene, comics, and video games. He also works as a historian, documenting Chicago artists in interviews and portraits, among them William Conger, Maria Gaspar, Melissa Ann Pinney, Colleen Plumb, Corey Postiglione, Alison Ruttan, and Bob Thall.

== Teaching ==
Alamo-Costello has taught in the Art and Design Department of the University of St. Francis (USF) in Joliet, Illinois since 1999, and served as chair of the department from 2001 to 2009. He built up USF's initially limited program, expanding facilities, hiring faculty, and increasing course offerings. He directed USF's Moser Performing Arts Center (MPAC) Gallery from 2009 to 2011 and 1999 to 2004, bringing in several international shows. Alamo-Costello is also the director of the Sichuan University of Science & Engineering (SUSE)/USF International Program in Zigong, China. Beginning in 2019, he taught at SUSE virtually; since 2023, he has taught and lived in China for part of the year in addition to teaching at USF.

Prior to arriving at USF, he taught photography at Columbia College Chicago (1995–2001), lectured at the Museum of Contemporary Photography in Chicago, and was an instructor at John Herron School of Art.

== Books ==
- Alamo-Costello, Chester. (2018). Somewhere In-Between Chicago, Artist Edition, Chicago. Essays by Max King Cap, Juan Angel Chávez, Anya Davidson, and Paul Melvin Hopkin. ISBN 9780692964644
- Alamo & Costello, Chester. (2010). The Globe, Chicago: Dark Lark Press. ISBN 9780615339412
- Alamo & Costello, Chester. (2008). Grandpa Danny, Chicago: Dark Lark Press. ISBN 9780615205960
