= Evan K =

German-Greek guitarist

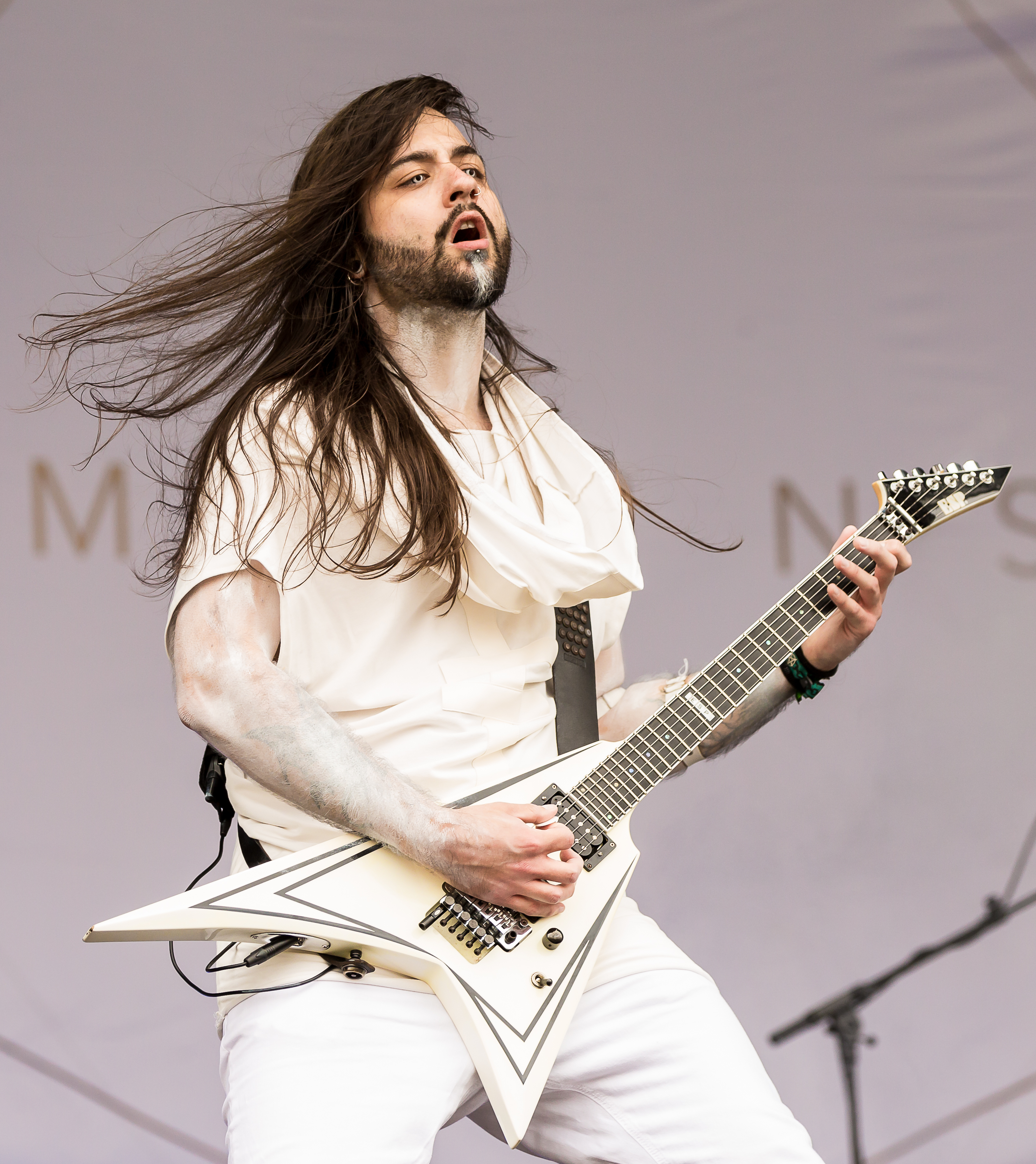
- Evan K with Enemy Inside at Rockharz Open Air 2022

Background information
- Born: Evangelos Koukoularis; 27 May 1994 (age 32); Hamburg, Germany
- Genres: Heavy metal, instrumental rock, hard rock, progressive rock, progressive metal, experimental rock, melodic death metal, industrial metal
- Occupation: Guitarist
- Years active: 2013–present
- Website: evanofficial.com

Evangelos Koukoularis (born 27 May 1994), known professionally as Evan K, is a German-Greek guitarist. He is the lead guitarist of the German power metal band Mystic Prophecy, former and lead guitarist of the German dark rock band Enemy Inside and ex-guitarist of the industrial death metal band Cypecore. Evan K also performs with the female symphonic metal band Exit Eden and works as a producer, solo artist and session musician in a wide range of music genres, from pop to rock and metal.

== Life and work ==
Evan K started playing guitar at the age of 11, inspired by famous hard rock bands like Scorpions, Deep Purple, Led Zeppelin, and Whitesnake. Five years later he completed the E-Guitar & Jazz Harmony program of Berklee College of Music through authorized local conservatories in Athens. At the age of 19, he left his German literature studies in Athens in order to study E-Guitar and popular music at the Popakademie Baden-Württemberg, University of Popular Music and Music Business in Mannheim, Germany. He was one out of the four guitarists chosen every year to study there.

In 2015, Evan K joined the industrial/death metal band Cypecore. In January 2016, the band released its third studio album Identity, with Evan K in the line-up.

In July 2016, Evan K released his first studio solo album Blue Lightning, where Fabio Lione (Rhapsody of Fire, Angra, Vision Divine) and Bob Katsionis (Firewind, Serious Black, Outloud), Markus Johansson (4ARM, Sylencer, THEM), Jimmy Pitts (Marco Minnemann, Christian Münzner) appear as special guests. The album was released in Europe via FC Metal Recordings and in Japan via King Records.

In 2017 Evan K recorded guitars and bass for the debut album Rhapsodies in Black by Exit Eden, a female symphonic metal band formed by Amanda Somerville, Clémentine Delauney, Marina La Torraca and Anna Brunner. The album features metal covers of some very popular hits such as Madonna's "Frozen", Adele's "Skyfall" and Lady Gaga's "Paparazzi". Simone Simons (Epica) appears as guest vocalist in the album.

In August 2017 Evan K was announced as the new lead guitarist of the German power metal band Mystic Prophecy.

At the end of 2017 Evan K formed the dark rock and modern metal band Enemy Inside with singer Nastassja Giulia and announced the release of their debut album Phoenix in September 2018 with R.O.A. Records and in August 2021 their second album Seven.

Evan K is endorsed by ESP Guitars, ENGL Amplifiers, Two Notes Engineering and HESU Cables. He enjoys testing and experimenting with new music gear and is also demonstrating products in his personal-(Evan K) as well as in ENGL TV channels in YouTube.

== Discography ==
=== EVAN ===
- Blue Lightning, 2016

=== with Enemy Inside ===
- Phoenix, (2018)
- Seven, (2021)
- Venom, (2025)

=== with Mystic Prophecy ===
- Monuments Uncovered, 2018
- Metal Division, 2020
- Hellriot, 2023

=== with Exit Eden ===
- Rhapsodies in Black, 2017

=== with Cypecore ===
- Identity, 2016
- The Alliance, 2018
