= Identity (Cypecore album) =

Studio album by Cypecore
- Released: 22 January 2016
- Recorded: 2014–2015
- Genres: Industrial metal, cyber metal, thrash metal, melodic death metal, metalcore
- Length: 51:00

Cypecore chronology
Take the Consequence (2010)	Identity (2016)	The Alliance (2018)

Professional ratings
Review scores
Source	Rating
Crossfire-Metal.de	7/10
Metal1.info	7.5/10
Powermetal.de	8.5/10

Identity is the third album by German metal band Cypecore, released in 2016. It is the band's first album with guitarist Evan K and vocalist Dominic Christoph. A music video for the bonus track "The Hills Have Eyes" was released on 12 March 2014, two years before the album was released. The album would be followed by their next one, The Alliance, released in 2018.

== Track listing ==
1. "Intro" - 1:22
2. "Saint of Zion" - 4:27
3. "Where the World Makes Sense" - 4:04
4. "My Confession" - 4:22
5. "Hollow Peace" - 4:35
6. "Identity" - 4:50
7. "Drive" - 3:38
8. "A New Dawn" - 4:02
9. "The Abyss" - 4:37
10. "The Void" - 5:39
11. "Outro" - 3:45
12. "The Hills Have Eyes" (bonus track) - 5:39

== Personnel ==
- Dominic Christoph - vocals
- Chris Heckel - bass
- Nils Lesser - guitar
- Evan K - guitar
- Tobias Derer - drums
