= Femmes Fatales (album) =

Studio album by Exit Eden
- Released: 12 January 2024
- Genre: Symphonic metal
- Length: 56:09
- Label: Napalm

Exit Eden chronology
| Rhapsodies in Black (2016) | Femmes Fatales (2024) |

Femmes Fatales is the second studio album by the symphonic metal group Exit Eden, released by Napalm Records on 12 January 2024.

== Reception ==
The album received mostly positive reviews. Tuonela Magazine described the album: "On their sophomore album, "Femmes Fatales," the trio – Clémentine Delauney (Visions of Atlantis), Anna Brunner (League of Distortion), and Marina La Torraca (Phantom Elite) – decided to branch out and try their hand at some original compositions to complement the covers. One of its greatest strengths is undoubtedly the top-notch vocals that showcase the singers at their absolute best, and their combined effort is spectacular, to say the least. The symphonic aspect also helps elevate the material and make "Femmes Fatales" a rewarding listening for fans of the genre, while the diversity of moods and soundscapes adds to the playability factor."

== Track listing ==
| No. | Title | Length |
|---|---|---|
| 1. | "Femme Fatale" | 4:45 |
| 2. | "It's a Sin" (Pet Shop Boys cover) | 4:39 |
| 3. | "Run! (featuring Marko Hietala)" | 4:52 |
| 4. | "Separate Ways" (Journey cover) | 4:36 |
| 5. | "Buried in the Past" | 5:03 |
| 6. | "Désenchantée" (Mylène Farmer cover) | 5:03 |
| 7. | "Dying in my Dreams" | 4:41 |
| 8. | "Poison" (Alice Cooper cover) | 4:34 |
| 9. | "Alone" (i-Ten cover) | 3:37 |
| 10. | "Hold Back Your Fear" | 5:11 |
| 11. | "Kayleigh" (Marillion cover) | 3:54 |
| 12. | "Elysium" | 5:14 |
| Total length: | | 56:09 |

== Personnel ==
Band members

- Anna Brunner – vocals
- Clémentine Delauney – vocals
- Marina La Torraca – vocals

Guests

- Marko Hietala – vocals (track 3)
- Jim Müller – guitars, bass
- Julian Breucker – guitars
- Sandro Friedrich – flute, Uillean pipes (track 3)
- Hannes Braun – vocals (backing), keyboards, drum programming, additional programming

== Charts ==
| Chart (2024) | Peak position |
|---|---|
| German Albums (Offizielle Top 100) | 36 |
| Austrian Albums (Ö3 Austria) | 20 |
| Scottish Albums (Official Charts) | 47 |
| Swiss Albums (Schweizer Hitparade) | 83 |
| UK Album Downloads (Official Charts) | 22 |
| UK Independent Albums (Official Charts) | 11 |
| UK Rock & Metal Albums (Official Charts) | 4 |
