= Make Me Real =

Studio album by Cypecore
- Released: 26 April 2024
- Recorded: 2023
- Genre: Melodic death metal, thrash metal, technical death metal, progressive death metal, industrial metal
- Length: 38:30
- Label: Easthaven Records

Cypecore chronology
The Alliance (2018)	Make Me Real (2024)

Professional ratings
Review scores
Source	Rating
Crossfire-Metal.de	6.5/10
Metal.de	8/10
Powermetal.de	8/10

Make Me Real is the fifth album by German metal band Cypecore, released on 26 April 2024. It is the band's first album without founding bassist Chris Heckel, after his death in 2018. The band chose not to replace Heckel out of respect for his memory. A music video was released for "I'll Be Back" on 25 August 2023. The band toured in support of the album in Germany with League of Distortion in April and May 2024.

== Track listing ==
1. "Intro" - 0:33
2. "Neoteric Gods" - 4:27
3. "Pinnacle of Creation" - 3:44
4. "Doomsday Parade" - 3:45
5. "Make Me Real" - 5:19
6. "King of Rats" - 3:49
7. "Fragments" - 3:58
8. "I'll Be Back" - 5:42
9. "Patient Zero" - 4:03
10. "Outro" - 3:10

== Personnel ==
- Dominic Christoph - vocals
- Nils Lesser - guitar, bass
- Pascal Olejnik - guitar
- Sebastian Unic - drums
