= A Lethal Dose of Truth =

Studio album by Sylencer
- Released: September 4, 2012
- Recorded: 2006–2012, Chicago
- Genre: Thrash metal
- Length: 75:22
- Labels: Sylencer Records, Inc.
- Producers: Markus Johansson and Christian Olde Wolbers

A Lethal Dose of Truth is the debut studio album of American thrash metal band Sylencer, released in 2012 by their independent label, Sylencer Records, Inc.

== Track listing ==
All tracks are written by Markus Johansson except where stated
(Lyrics to "Get It Up" adapted by The Heathen).

No.	Title	Writer(s)	Length
1.	"Day by Day"		3:30
2.	"Eternal"		4:58
3.	"88 Reasons to Hate"		5:12
4.	"Shock and Awe"		3:17
5.	"Permanent Heartbreak"		3:31
6.	"Dead to Your World"		3:03
7.	"Scream at the Stars" (instrumental)		5:20
8.	"Sinners in the Hands of an Angry God"		5:38
9.	"The End of the Nightmare"		4:20
10.	"Rise and Die"	Markus Johansson, Johnny Rox	10:08
11.	"Afflicted"		4:34
12.	"Evilution"		4:23
13.	"Asche zu Asche" (Rammstein cover)	Rammstein	3:55
14.	"Wired in the Blood"		4:45
15.	"Acquiesce"		4:10
16.	"Get It Up" (Van Halen cover)	Van Halen	4:19
Total length:			75:22

== Reception ==
Angela from metal-temple.com rated the album 10/10 and said: "A Lethal Dose Of Truth was six long years in the making, with an incredible list of guest musicians, including Gene Hoglan, Brendon Small, Andy LaRocque, Steve Di Giorgio, and others. Everything is intense and driving on this album. 15 epic tracks of controlled chaos that will not leave your CD player."

== Credits ==
Sylencer

- Markus Johansson – vocals, guitars
- Johnny Rox – bass guitar
- Kevin Talley – drums, percussion (Tracks 1–13)

Guest musicians

- Larry Tarnowski – lead guitar (Tracks 1–3, 5–12)
- Metal Mike Chlasciak – lead guitar (Track 3)
- Emil Werstler – lead guitar (Track 4)
- Michael Angelo Batio – lead guitar (Track 7)
- Roland Grapow – lead guitar (Track 7)
- Steve Di Giorgio – bass guitar (Track 8)
- Rob Caggiano – lead guitar (Track 10)
- Jordan Rudess – keyboards (Track 10)
- Christian Lasegue – lead guitar (Track 10)
- Andy LaRocque – lead guitar (Track 11)
- Marco Minnemann – drums (Track 14)
- Steve Smyth – lead guitar (Track 15)
- Sean Reinert – drums (Track 15)
- The Heathen – lead vocals (Track 16)
- Brendon Small – lead guitar (Track 16)
- Gene Hoglan – drums (Track 16)

== Production ==
- Markus Johansson – Producer, Vocal Production
- Christian Olde Wolbers – Vocal Production
- Orlando Villasenor – Mixing
- Maor Appelbaum – Mastering
- Gianluca Trombetta – Editing, Engineer
