= The Alliance (album) =

Studio album by Cypecore
- Released: 16 February 2018
- Recorded: 2017
- Genres: Groove metal, industrial metal, cyber metal, melodic death metal, metalcore
- Length: 57:02
- Label: Vaultroom Records

Cypecore chronology
Identity (2016)	The Alliance (2018)	Make Me Real (2024)

Professional ratings
Review scores
Source	Rating
Crossfire-Metal.de	8/10
Metal.de	8/10
Powermetal.de	8/10
Stormbringer	4.5/5

The Alliance is the fourth album by German metal band Cypecore, released in 2018. It is the band's final album with drummer Tobias Derer, guitarist Evan K, and founding bassist Chris Heckel. The lattermost died months after the album's release. A music video was released for the single "Dreamsmasher" on 25 May 2020.

== Track listing ==
1. "Intro" - 0:33
2. "The Alliance" - 4:27
3. "Dissatisfactory" - 5:44
4. "Dreamsmasher" - 6:22
5. "Aeons" - 5:19
6. "Reject the Stream" - 3:36
7. "Remembrance" - 7:12
8. "The Voice of Conviction" - 5:20
9. "Leviathan" - 5:27
10. "Values of Death" - 4:56
11. "The Gift of Failure" - 4:27
12. "Outro" - 3:39

== Personnel ==
- Dominic Christoph - vocals
- Chris Heckel - bass
- Nils Lesser - guitar
- Evan K - guitar
- Tobias Derer - drums
