= Kissin' Dynamite =

German heavy metal band

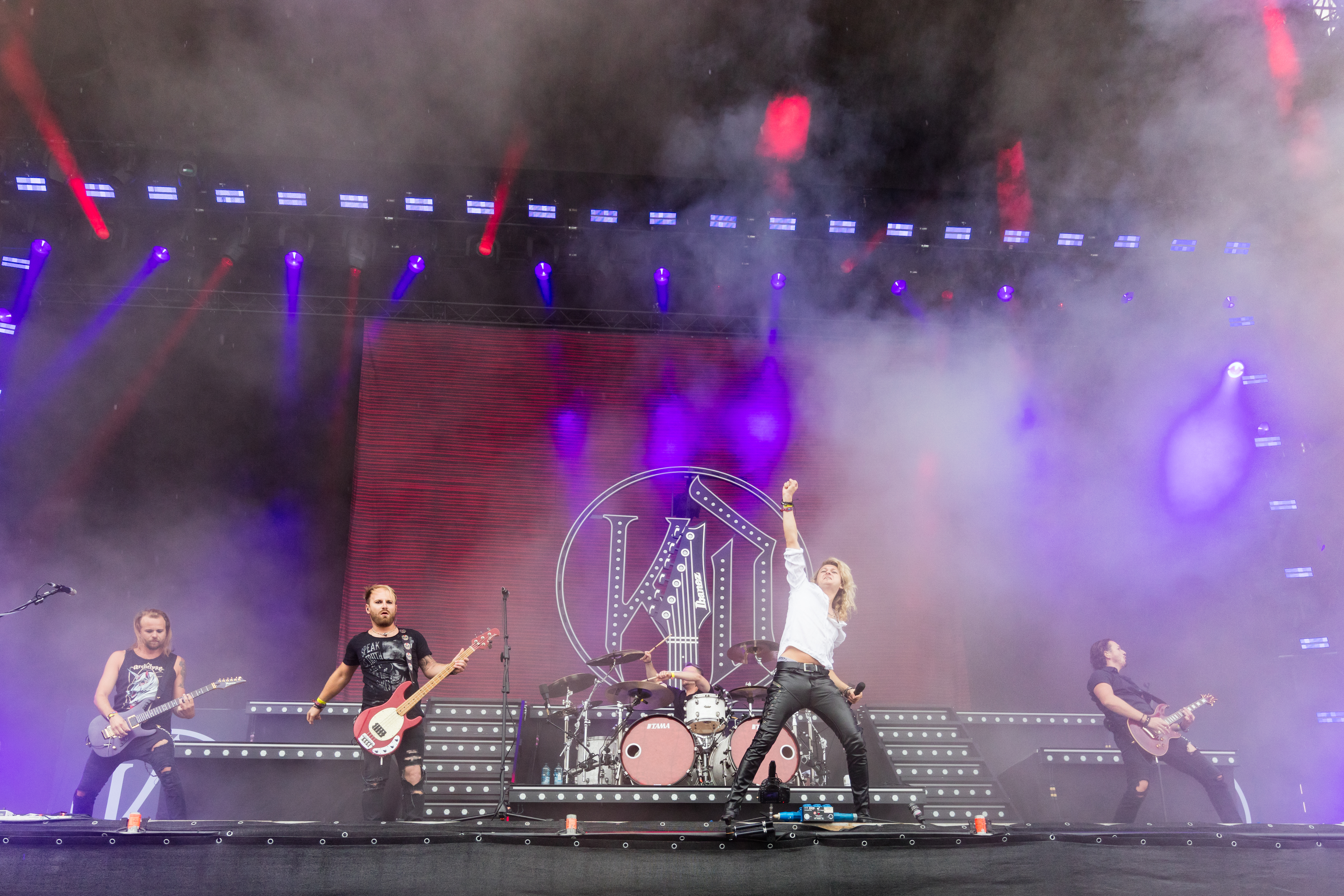
- Kissin' Dynamite at Wacken Open Air 2022

Background information
- Origin: Burladingen and Münsingen, Germany
- Genres: Hard rock, heavy metal, glam metal
- Years active: 2006–present
- Labels: AFM, EMI, Metal Blade, Napalm
- Members: Johannes "Hannes" Braun; Ande Braun; Jim Müller; Steffen Haile; Andi Schnitzer
- Website: kissin-dynamite.de

Kissin' Dynamite is a German hard rock/heavy metal band from Burladingen and Münsingen.

== History ==
Kissin' Dynamite started as a school band. Since 2007, the band has worked with the Flensburg production team Elephant Music. At the end of 2007, they started sending demos to various music labels, leading to a record contract with Capitol Records / EMI in the same year. They released their debut album Steel of Swabia in 2008, and in that year also started appearing in music festivals, which included Bang Your Head.

Their second album, also produced by Elephant Music, was titled Addicted to Metal and had twelve tracks. The title track, "Addicted to Metal" features vocals by Udo Dirkschneider of U.D.O. for whom Kissin' Dynamite frequently opened. In March 2011, Kissin' Dynamite announced that they had started working on their third album, which would be published by their new label, AFM Records. The album was completed in 2011, and released under the title Money, Sex and Power in March 2012. As part of the launch, the band opened for L.A. glam metal band Steel Panther on their Tour.

In 2014 they released the album Megalomania, followed in 2016 by Generation Goodbye, then in 2018 by Ecstacy which broke them into the top ten on the German charts for the first time.

Prior to Kissin' Dynamite, Hannes Braun achieved second place in the 2004 season of the German version of the Sat.1 show Star Search singing heavy metal at the age of 12.

Hannes Braun is also the producer of Exit Eden, and has had a relationship with Exit Eden singer Anna Brunner for years. Both lived in Flensburg from 2015 to 2019 and worked for Elephant Music. Anna Brunner and Hannes Braun have been living in Betzingen since 2020 and run their own production company.

== Name ==
According to guitarist Jim Müller, the band was named after the AC/DC song of the same name. During a band meeting to choose a name, Andi Schnitzer's cellphone rang, and the song was his ringtone, leading to the decision. AllMusic also named Bon Jovi and Mötley Crüe as inspirations for the groups musical style.

== Band members ==
Kissin' Dynamite live at Rockharz Open Air 2019

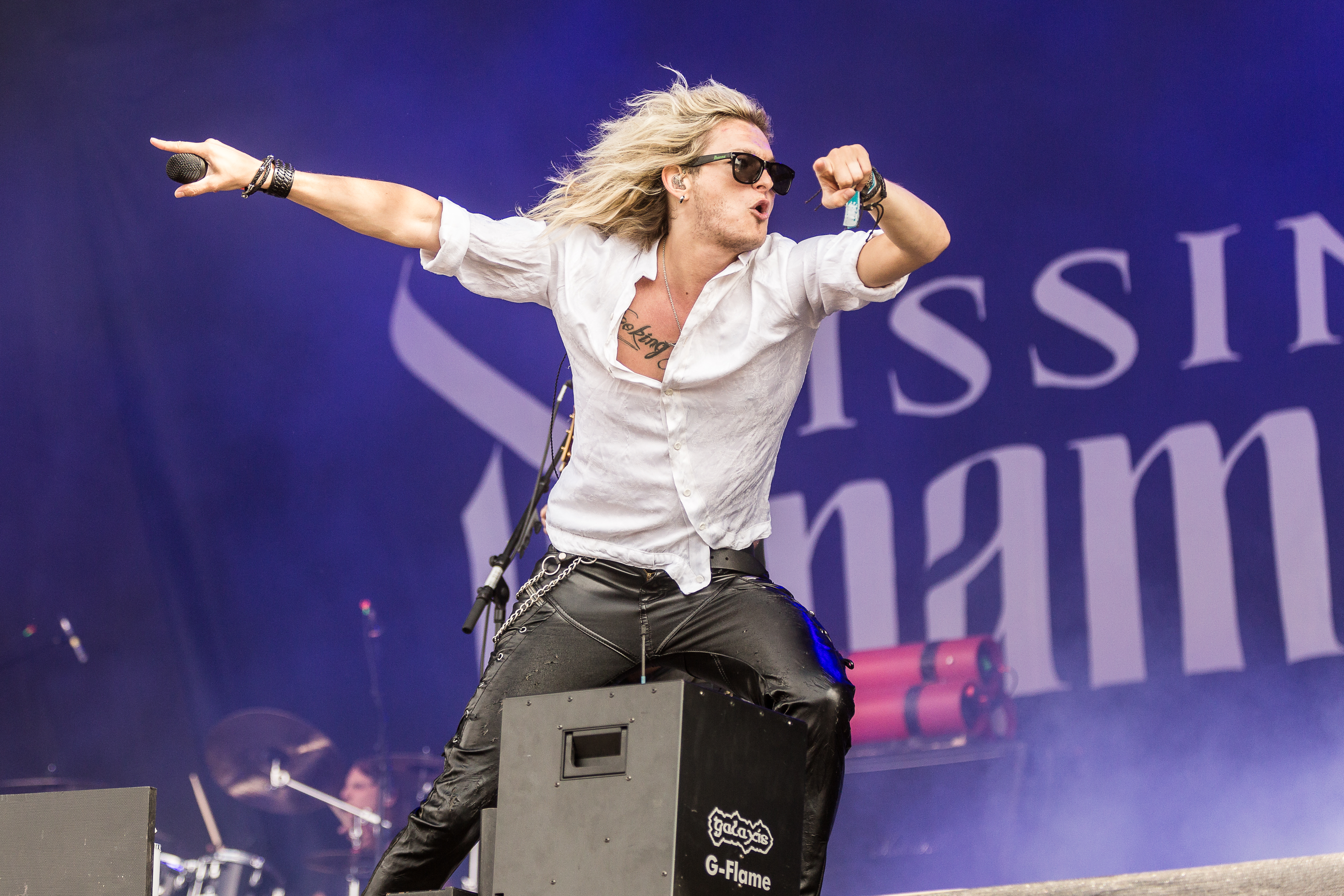
Hannes Braun

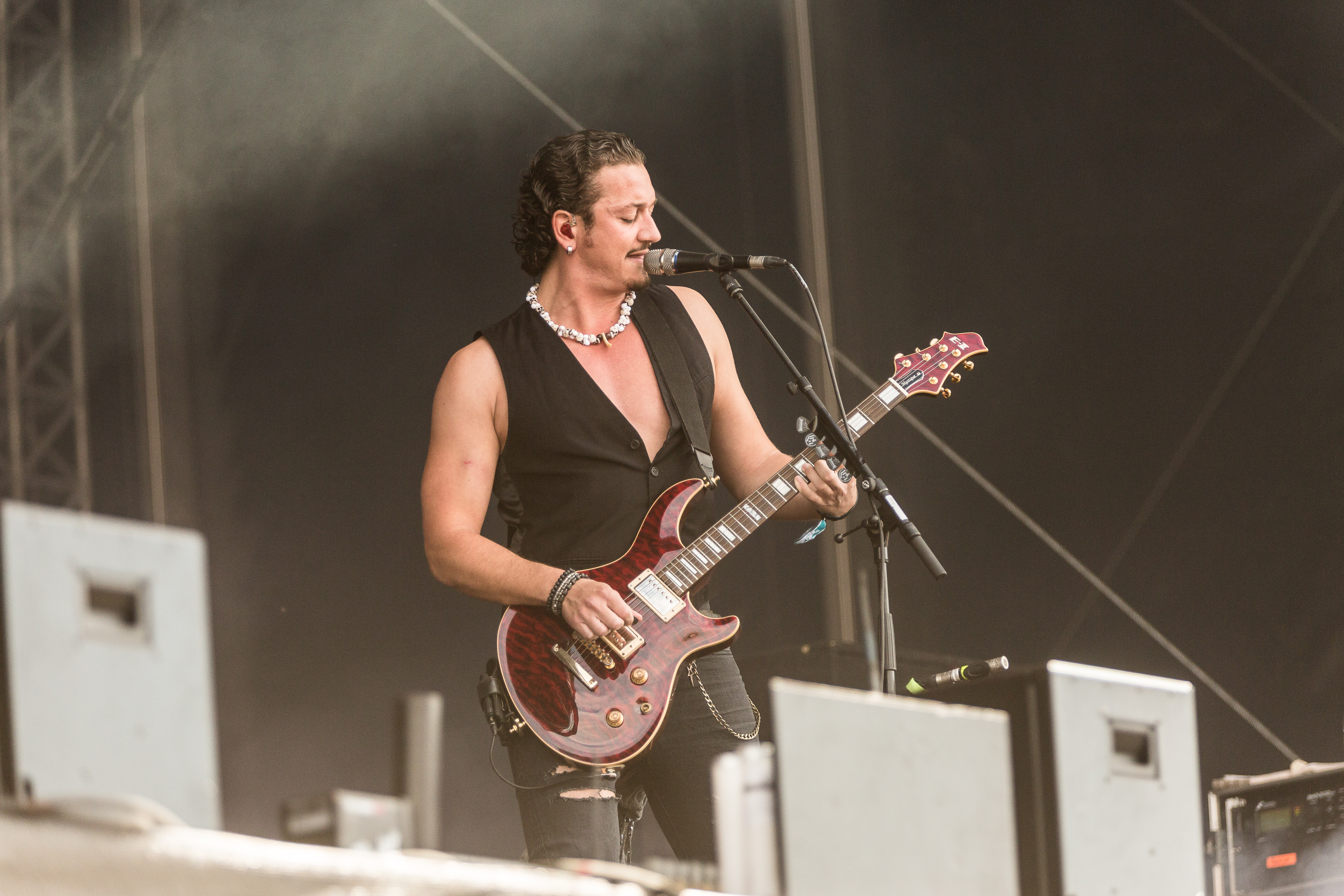
Ande Braun

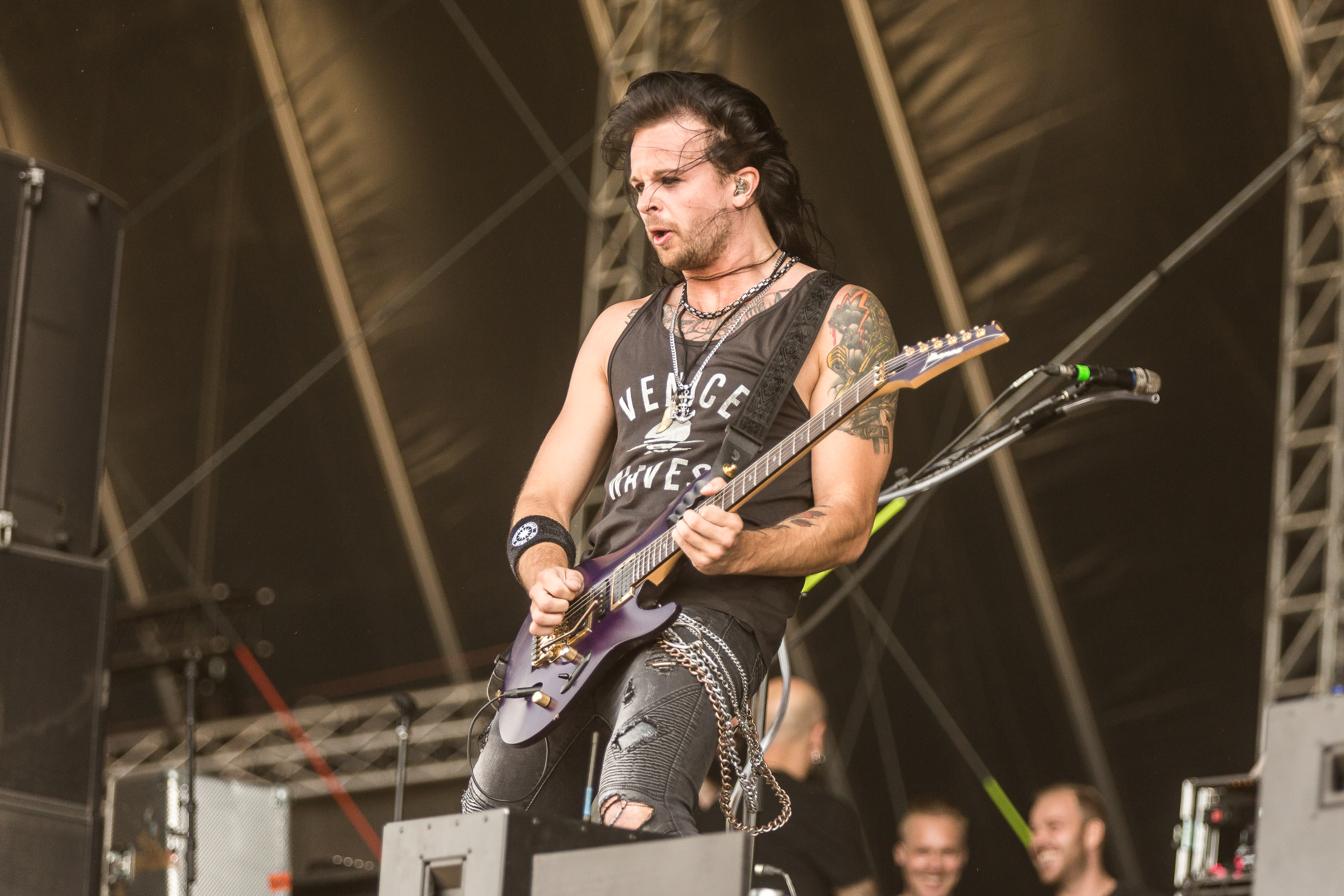
Jim Müller

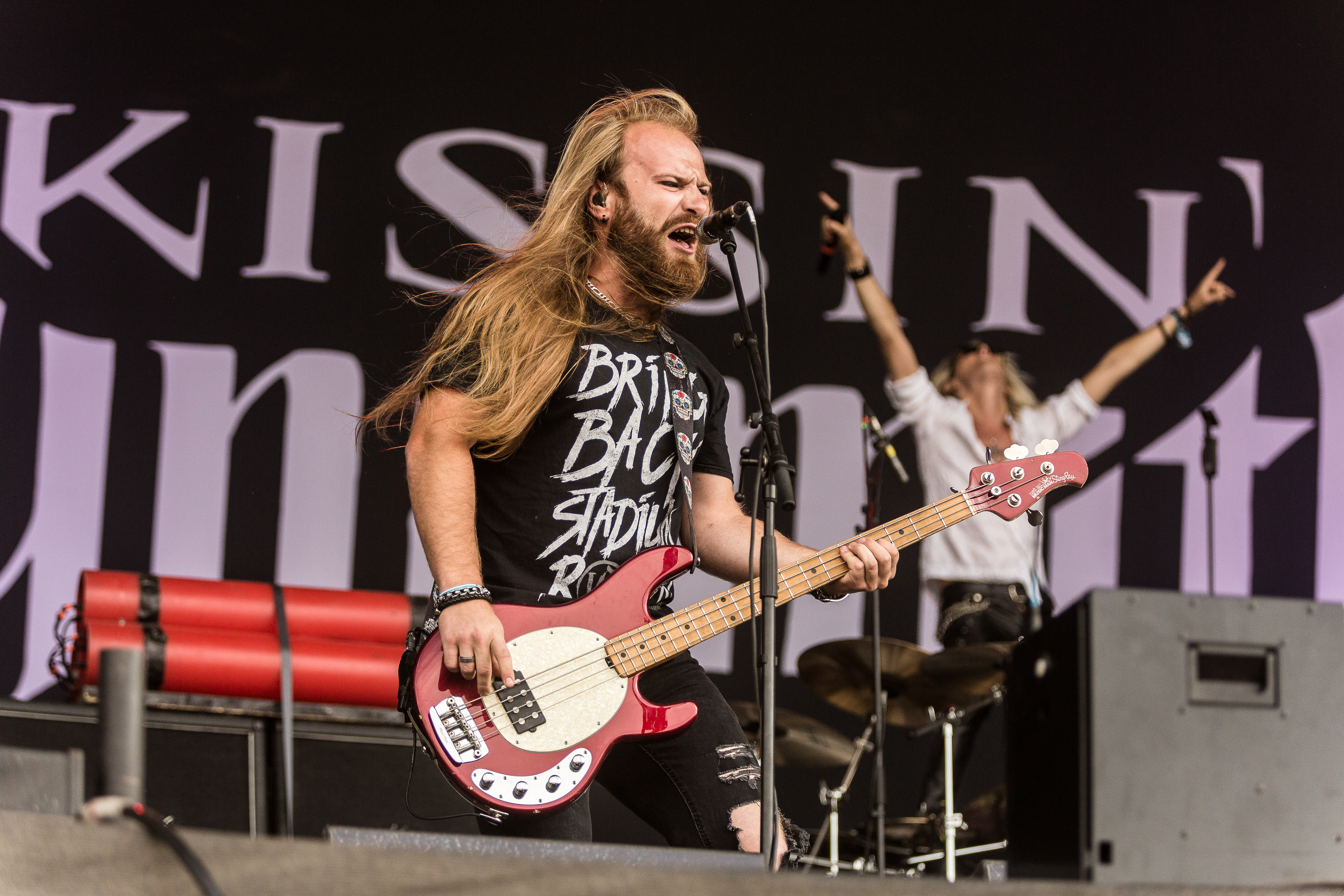
Steffen Haile

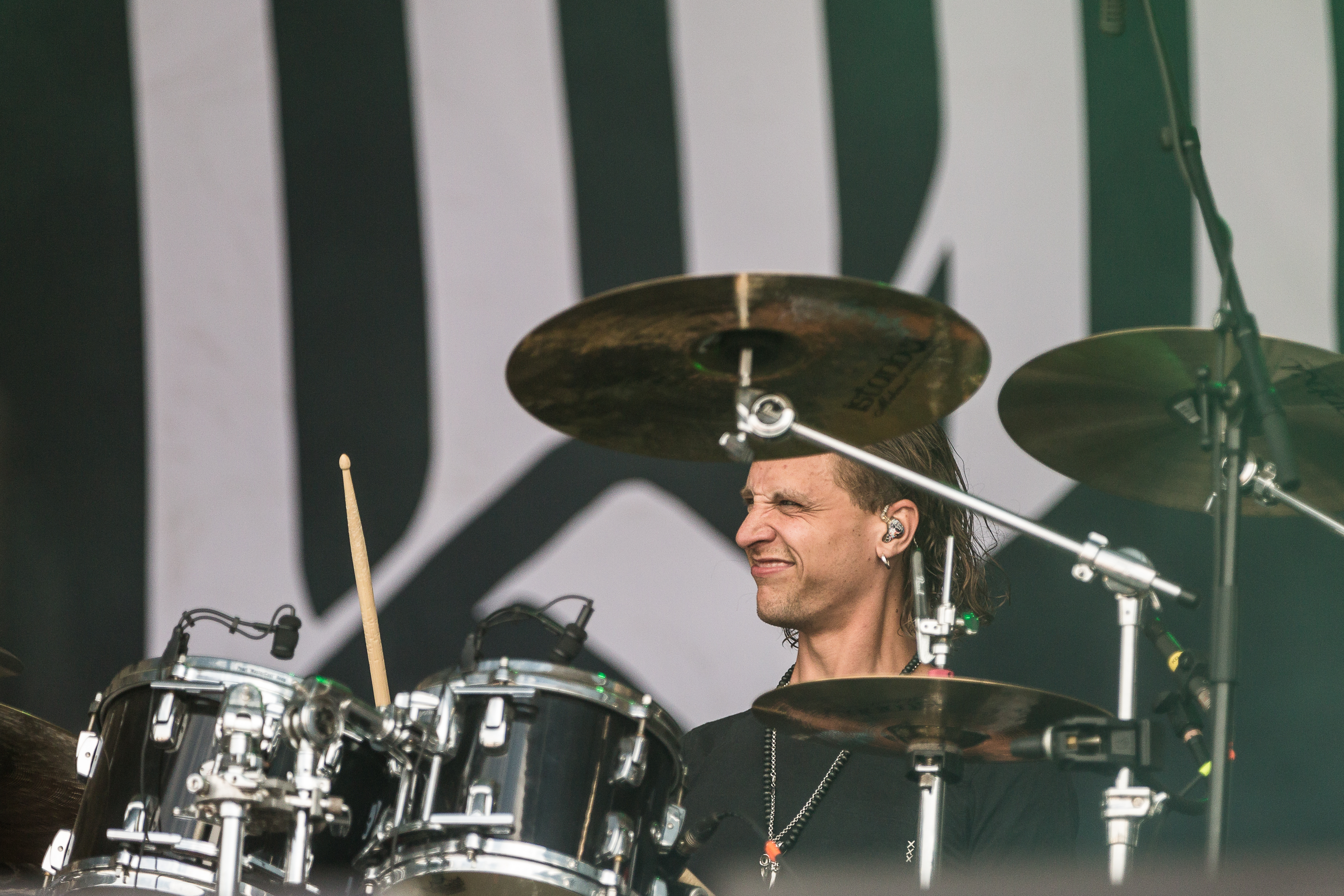
Former drummer Andi Schnitzer

Current

- Ande Braun – guitars
- Jim Müller – guitars
- Steffen Haile – bass guitar
- Sebastian Berg – drums (since 2021)

Former

- Andi Schnitzer (until 2021)
- Johannes (Hannes) Braun – vocals (until 2026)

== Awards and nominations ==
Year	Award	Category	Nominee/work	Result	Ref.
2013	Metal Hammer Awards (Germany)	Up and Coming	Kissin' Dynamite	Nominated	
2017	Metal Hammer Awards (Germany)	Best German Band	Kissin' Dynamite	Nominated	
2018	Metal Hammer Awards (Germany)	Best German Band	Kissin' Dynamite	Won	
2023	Pop Awards	Band/Group of the Year	Kissin' Dynamite	Nominated	

== Discography ==
Year	Title	Chart positions	
Year	Title	GER	SWI
2008	Steel of Swabia	—	—
2010	Addicted to Metal	91	—
2012	Money, Sex and Power	50	—
2014	Megalomania	17	—
2016	Generation Goodbye	14	59
2018	Ecstasy	7	30
2022	Not the End of the Road	2	13
2024	Back with a Bang!	1	11
2026	Kissin' Dynamite	1	12
