= Markus Johansson =

American musician

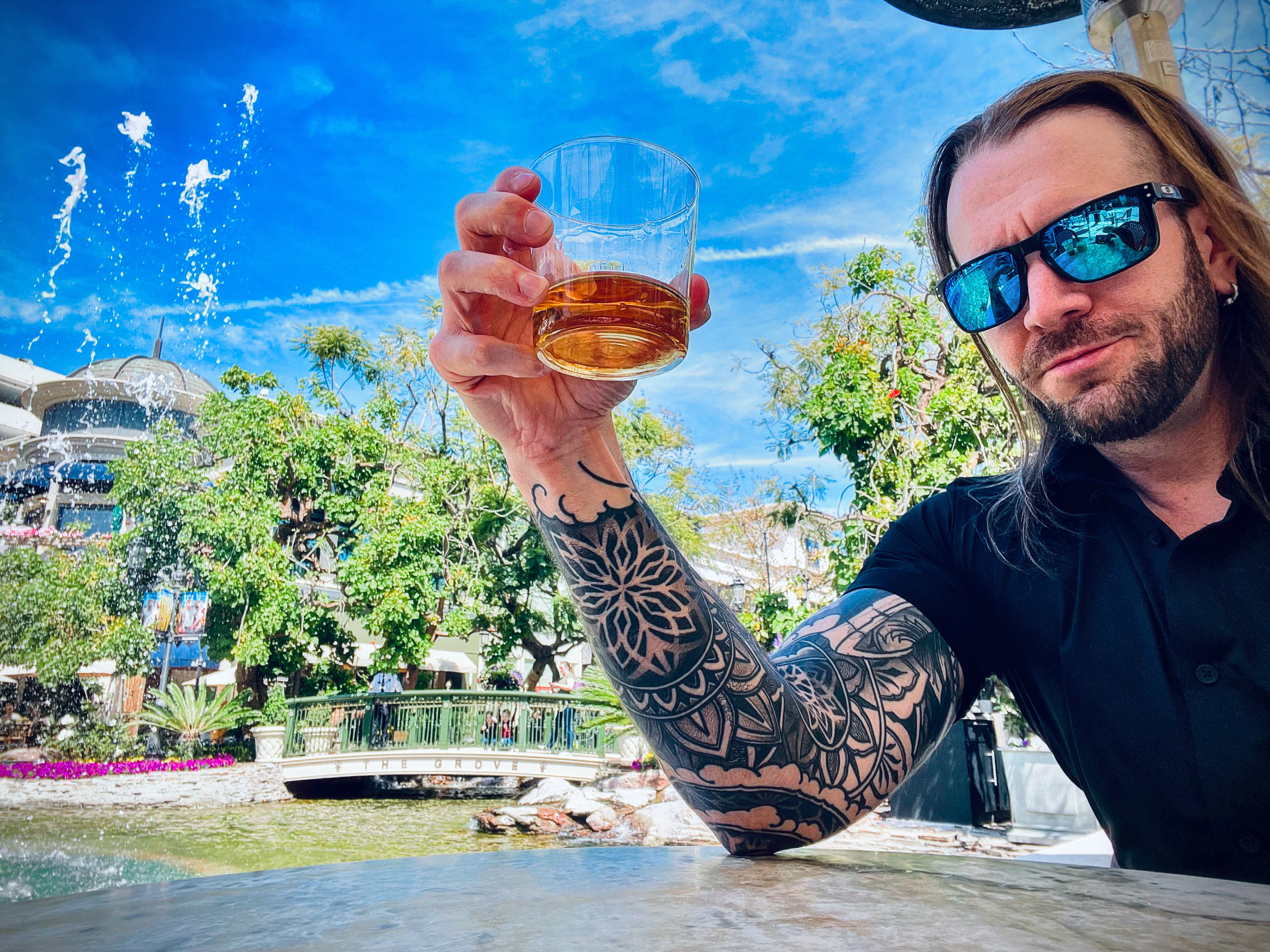

Background information
- Born: December 22, 1984 (age 40); Chicago, Illinois, U.S.
- Genres: Heavy metal, thrash metal, hard rock, speed metal, power metal, progressive metal
- Occupation(s): Musician, songwriter
- Instrument(s): Guitar, vocals
- Years active: 2006–present
- Website: johanssonshreds.com

Markus Johansson (born December 22, 1984) is an American heavy metal guitarist and vocalist from Chicago. He is currently the lead guitarist for the international touring band THEM. Johansson is also the lead vocalist and guitarist for Sylencer, Australian thrash metal band 4ARM, as well as a session guitarist for various projects.

== Biography ==
Johansson is a self-taught lead guitarist from Chicago, Illinois, who began playing guitar when he was 13 years old. At the age of 17, he auditioned for Limp Bizkit, to which Fred Durst humorously told him to "go play for Megadeth, instead." In 2009, Johansson auditioned with Dying Fetus, but continued on as the lead vocalist and lead guitarist of the band Sylencer.

=== Recent events ===
In the summer of 2004, Johansson founded the band Sylencer and began recording their debut album, "A Lethal Dose of Truth" in 2006. He recruited drummer Kevin Talley and guitarist Larry Tarnowski to round out the lineup for his debut release. The majority of the album was recorded by the end of 2006, Johansson recruited several big names in the heavy metal community which grew to include members of Dream Theater, Anthrax, Dethklok, and nearly a dozen others. A Lethal Dose of Truth was released independently in September 2012 through Sylencer Records.

In the spring of 2014, Johansson collaborated with guitarist Toby Knapp on the instrumental album Unborn Spirits Immortal. The album was released in June 2014 through Shred Guy records. That same year, Johansson joined Australian metal band, 4ARM as their lead singer/guitarist and recorded their 2015 album, Survivalist. Currently, Johansson is the lead guitarist for the heavy metal band THEM and recorded on their 2016 album, Fear Them. He joined their spring tour which headlined Helloween.

Johansson did several tours with THEM.

- Harder than Steel (9/30/17)
- Mountains of Madness (10/20/17)
- German Swordbrothers Festival (2/14/18)
- Metalheadz Open Air 2018 (5/11/18)

On May 23, 2018, Johansson joined Repentance and opened for Trivium.

Johansson spent the majority of 2019 and 2020 working on his studio tan and on the debut Repentance album "God For A Day," and THEM's "Return to Hemmersmoor," in addition to several other session projects. He did a short European tour with THEM in spring of 2019.

In fall of 2020, Johansson joined Chicago's legendary 80's Hair Metal tribute, Hairbangers Ball as "Darrell Diamond." During the COVID-19 pandemic downtime, the group collaborated and released an original single "All Aboard the Bang Train" – a song about the famous Bluebird Nightclub in Bloomington, Indiana. Also, Johnasson, in addition to other former members of Repentance, to form a new project, Divinity Plague.

== Equipment ==
ESP Guitars, ISP Technologies, FU-Tone, BTPA, Rocktron, Fastback Custom, Cleartone Guitar Strings, Protone Pedals, Two Notes Audio Engineering.

Johannson has his own custom pickup, The Cobra Igniter.

== Bands ==
- Sylencer 2006–present
- 4ARM 2013–present
- THEM 2015–present
- Repentance 2018–2021
- Hairbangers Ball 2020–2022
- Divinity Plague 2021–present

== Discography ==
=== Sylencer ===
- A Lethal Dose of Truth (2012)

=== THEM ===
- "Fear Them" (2016)
- "Sweet Hollow" (2016)
- "Manor of the Seven Gables" (2018)
- "Back in the Garden Where Death Sleeps" (2019)
- "Return to Hemmersmoor" (2020)
- "Fear City" (2022)

=== Knapp/Johansson ===
- "Unborn Spirits Immortal" (2014)
- "Electric Gathering" (2015)

=== 4ARM ===
- "Survivalist" (2015)
- Pathway to Oblivion (2023)

=== Repentance ===
- "God for a Day" (2020)

=== Evan K ===
- Blue Lightning (2016), guest vocals on "Everything Is Coming Up Roses"

=== Hairbangers Ball ===
- "All Aboard the Bang Train" (single) (2021)
- "Play Dangerous" (single) (2021)
