= Blue Lightning (Evan K album) =

Studio album by Evan K
- Released: July 15, 2016 (Europe); July 27, 2016 (Japan)
- Recorded: Epsilon Studio, The Prophecy and Music Factory Studios [[]], Kempten, Germany
- Genre: Power metal
- Length: 44:40
- Labels: FC Metal Recordings, King Records
- Producer: Evan K

Blue Lightning is the first solo album of guitar virtuoso Evan K, released 2016 by FC Metal Recordings in Europe and King Records in Japan. It consists of 6 instrumental titles and 3 songs (the Japanese version includes two additional bonus tracks) and features some famous guests from the Power-Progressive Metal Scene like Fabio Lione (Rhapsody Of Fire, Angra, Vision Divine), Bob Katsionis (Firewind, Serious Black, Outloud), Markus Johansson (4ARM, Sylencer) and Jimmy Pitts (Marco Minnemann, Christian Münzner).

== Track listing ==
1. "Rising" (Instrumental) - 1:16
2. "Into The Light" (Instrumental) - 5:04
3. "Skies Of Shred" (Instrumental) - 4:49
4. "Picking The Stars" (Instrumental) - 4:06
5. "Orchestra Of Withered Clouds" (Instrumental) - 8:18
6. "Blue Lightning" (Instrumental) - 5:33
7. "Edge Of The Sky" (vocals Fabio Lione) - 5:04
8. "One Last Time" (vocals Fabio Lione) - 6:20
9. "Everything Is Coming Up Roses" ( Black Cover / vocals Markus Johansson) - 4:10
10. "Far Beyond The Sun" (Yngwie Malmsteen Cover) *** Bonus track - Japan release
11. "Edge Of The Sky" (Instrumental) *** Bonus track - Japan release

== Personnel ==
- Evan K - Guitars
- Fabio Lione - Vocals on "Edge Of The Sky" & "One Last Time"
- Bob Katsionis - Keyboards
- Markus Johansson - Vocals on "Everything Is Coming Up Roses"
- Jimmy Pitts - Keyboards on "Everything Is Coming Up Roses
- Jim C. - Bass
- Danny Joe Hofmann - Drums

== Credits ==
- All music and lyrics written by Evan K.
- Produced and recorded by Evan K at Epsilon Studio in Mannheim, Germany.
- All keyboards arranged and produced by Bob Katsionis (Firewind, Serious Black, Outloud) at Sound Symmetry Studio in Athens, Greece.
- All vocals recorded by Fabio Lione (Rhapsody Of Fire, Angra, Vision Divine) in Pisa, Italy.
- Vocals on Track 9, "Everything Is Coming Up Roses" recorded by Markus Johansson (4ARM, Sylencer, THEM) in Chicago, USA.
- Keyboards on Track 9, "Everything Is Coming Up Roses", recorded by Jimmy Pitts (Marco Minnemann, Christian Münzner) in Missouri, USA.
- Mixed and Mastered by R.D. Liapakis (Mystic Prophecy, Devil's Train) and Christian Schmid at The Prophecy and Music Factory Studios (Mystic Prophecy, Suicidal Angels, Devil's Train, Steel Prophet, Eldritch etc.) in Kempten, Germany.
- Logo concept, design, album artwork and layout by Abstrata - The Art of Gustavo Sazes.
