= Anna Brunner (singer) =

- Born: Anna Brunner
- Genres: Heavy metal; alternative metal; symphonic metal
- Occupations: Singer; songwriter
- Instrument: Vocals
- Member of: Exit Eden; League of Distortion

Anna Brunner is a German singer and a founding member of the symphonic metal supergroup Exit Eden. She is also the lead singer of her own band League of Distortion.

== Life and career ==
Brunner grew up bilingually in Freiburg im Breisgau as the daughter of a German father and an American mother. She founded her first rock band as a teenager.

After finishing school, she studied jazz and pop music at the Popakademie Baden-Württemberg. She also attended Columbia College Chicago. She focused on singing and songwriting. She also had the opportunity to play gigs with individual bands.

In 2018, Brunner sang a duet with Santiano with the song Im Auge des Sturms.

Brunner is in a relationship with Hannes Braun and has already performed on stage with him and his heavy metal band Kissin' Dynamite (European tour). She came to Exit Eden through a studio job at Elephant Music, where she had worked until 2019. In 2022, Brunner released the debut album of the same name with her band League of Distortion. She founded League of Distortion together with Kissin' Dynamite guitarist Jim Müller.

== Discography ==
=== Beyond the Black ===
- 2016: Lost in Forever (Track 1 and 6)

=== Santiano ===
- 2018: Im Auge des Sturms (Track 1)

=== Kissin’ Dynamite ===
- 2016: Generation Goodbye (Track 4)
- 2018: Ecstasy (Track 4 and 9)

=== Exit Eden ===
- 2017: Rhapsodies in Black
- 2024: Femmes Fatales

=== League of Distortion ===
- 2022 League of Distortion (album)
- 2024 Galvanize (album)

=== Compilations ===
- Various – Die Ultimative Chart Show – Die Erfolgreichsten Hits 2018 – Santiano: Im Auge Des Sturms
