= Lola Omolola =

Nigerian journalist

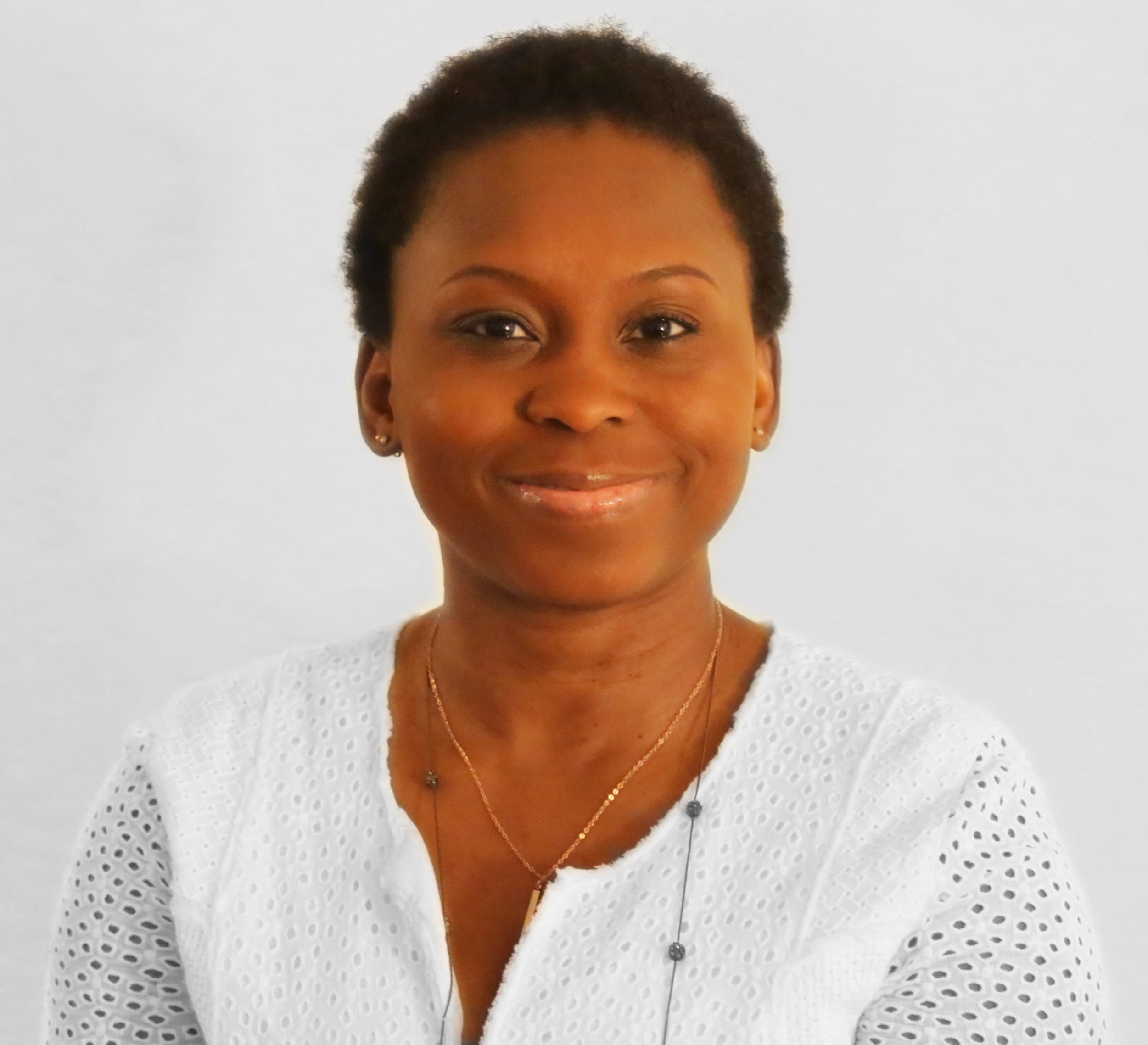
- Born: 1976 (age 49–50); Lagos, Nigeria
- Education: Bachelor's degree in Broadcast journalism
- Alma mater: Columbia College
- Occupations: Journalist, community engagement strategist
- Notable work: Female IN
- Children: 2

Lola Omolola (born 1976) is a Nigerian former journalist who founded the Female IN (FIN) group on Facebook. Lola is the first Nigerian woman who created a place where other women can share their untold stories regarding their sexual abuses, and other challenges they are facing. She was featured in the 2018 Facebook F8 Conference.

== Education ==
Omolola completed her primary and secondary studies in Nigeria. After moving to the United States, she earned a Bachelor's degree in Broadcast journalism from Columbia College in Chicago.

== Career ==
Omolola is a former journalist, and she owned some TV shows in Nigeria. After earning her degree, she worked at the Community Counseling Centers of Chicago where she assisted people with mental health issues. Omolola also worked for apartments.com, but she quit after she had children. At home, she taught herself how to code. She eventually began running the site spicebaby.com in order to share Nigerian food recipes. In 2015, the kidnapping of the Chibok girls inspired her to create the Facebook group Female in Nigeria. The purpose of the group was for women living in Nigeria to connect and share their stories without embarrassment. The group's name was eventually changed to "Female IN" to accommodate its increasingly diverse membership of over one million women. It is a private page that can only be accessed by its members. Omolola's goal is to help women who are struggling in life, but can not tell anyone about their issues due to their environment. In an interview with Mark Zuckerberg, she stated that "[w]henever a girl shows any sign of self-awareness she gets silenced."

== Accomplishments ==
After she created FIN, Omolola met the Facebook founder Mark Zuckerberg. They discussed how women are getting support from FIN. In an interview with CNN, Mark Zuckerberg praised her for connecting voiceless women and building a safe community for them on Facebook. Lola is now planning to move forward with FIN by "providing centres where women can go to talk about their experiences in a safe space."
