= The Mazeking =

- Born: Unknown; 1968 (age 57–58)
- Education: Columbia College Chicago University of London
- Known for: Painting, Photography
- Notable work: Happiness Here, Process Series
- Website: themazeking.com

The Mazeking (born 1968) is an American contemporary visual artist living and working in New York City.

He has a master's degree from Columbia College Chicago. He is best known for his creation of "Happiness Here," an interactive public art project in which he created over 183 colorful chalk based interactive artworks throughout New York City from the summer of 2012 to the spring of 2014. In 2013, the artist took the project on the road and did public installations of "Happiness Here" art in Baltimore, Jersey City and Chicago. These temporal public artworks have been seen by thousands of people. In the winter of 2014, he collaborated with the French fashion company Somewhere and created several Happiness Here public installations in Paris. He creates both traditional and mixed media artworks, often combining various mediums such as, oil, acrylic paint and concrete, among others.
