= Blue Lightning (Yngwie Malmsteen album) =

Studio album by Yngwie Malmsteen
- Released: 29 March 2019
- Length: 58:07
- Label: King; Mascot
- Producer: Yngwie J. Malmsteen

Yngwie Malmsteen chronology
World on Fire (2016)	Blue Lightning (2019)	Parabellum (2021)

Blue Lightning is the twenty-first studio album and 2nd cover album released by Yngwie Malmsteen in 2019.

== Background ==
The album features cover songs of the classic rock music that Yngwie has been influenced by throughout his career, as well as tracks that explore his blues roots for the first time. As with his previous release World on Fire, he did not employ a dedicated vocalist; instead, Yngwie performs the lead vocals himself. Of the fourteen tracks, including bonus tracks, ten are covers and four are original compositions ("Blue Lightning," "1911 Strut," "Sun’s Up Top’s Down," and "Peace, Please"), with "1911 Strut" and "Peace, Please" being instrumental pieces. The album was released worldwide on 29 March 2019.

The obi strip commentary on the Japanese edition describes it as: "A masterful work completed as the king retraces the roots of classic rock. An artistic creation in which rock and blues captivate through his passion and guitar technique. This is the first new album in roughly two years from Yngwie Malmsteen, one of the leading guitarists in the metal scene. Alongside original compositions written by confronting his roots in blues and classic rock, the album also includes cover songs personally selected by Yngwie. A powerful work filled with the spirit of a master, expressing historic rock classics through his passionate guitar playing and vocals."

== Track listing ==
Blue Lightning track list
No.	Title	Writer(s)	Original artist/album	Length
1.	"Blue Lightning"	Yngwie J. Malmsteen	(original)	4:52
2.	"Foxey Lady"	Jimi Hendrix	Jimi Hendrix Experience/Are You Experienced	4:51
3.	"Demon's Eye"	Ritchie Blackmore, Ian Gillan, Roger Glover, Jon Lord, Ian Paice	Deep Purple/Fireball	3:50
4.	"1911 Strut" (instrumental)	Malmsteen	(original)	2:41
5.	"Blue Jean Blues"	Billy Gibbons, Dusty Hill, Frank Beard	ZZ Top/Fandango!	7:01
6.	"Purple Haze"	Hendrix	Jimi Hendrix Experience/Are You Experienced	3:56
7.	"While My Guitar Gently Weeps"	George Harrison	The Beatles/The Beatles	5:50
8.	"Sun's Up Top's Down"	Malmsteen	(original)	4:04
9.	"Peace, Please" (instrumental)	Malmsteen	(original)	3:44
10.	"Paint It Black"	Jagger-Richards	Rolling Stones/Aftermath	4:08
11.	"Smoke on the Water"	Blackmore, Gillan, Glover, Lord, Paice	Deep Purple/Machine Head	3:18
12.	"Forever Man"	Jerry Lynn Williams	Eric Clapton/Behind the Sun	2:49

Bonus tracks
No.	Title	Writer(s)	Original artist/album	Length
13.	"Little Miss Lover"	Hendrix	The Jimi Hendrix Experience/Axis: Bold as Love	3:13
14.	"Jumpin' Jack Flash"	Jagger-Richards	Rolling Stones/Through the Past, Darkly (Big Hits Vol. 2)	3:50

== Personnel ==
- Yngwie J. Malmsteen - guitar, bass, vocal, keyboard, Hammond B3
- Lawrence Lannerbach - drums

== Charts ==
Chart (2019)	Peak position
Belgian Albums (Ultratop Wallonia)	85
Finnish Albums (Suomen virallinen lista)	38
French Albums (SNEP)	103
Italian Albums (FIMI)	96
Japanese Albums (Oricon)	35
Swiss Albums (Schweizer Hitparade)	35
