= Melissa Ann Pinney =

American photographer (born 1953)

- Born: February 12, 1953 (age 73); St. Louis, Missouri, U.S.
- Known for: Photography
- Website: http://www.melissaannpinney.com

Melissa Ann Pinney (born February 12, 1953) is an American photographer best known for her closely observed studies of the social lives and emerging identities of American girls and women. Pinney's photographs have won the photographer numerous fellowships and awards, including Guggenheim and NEA Fellowships, and found their way into the collections of the major museums in the US and abroad.

Melissa Ann Pinney's work first garnered attention when it was included in the Museum of Modern Art's major 1991 exhibition, Pleasures and Terrors of Domestic Comfort. Her evocative and sharply attentive photographs of the stages of life in American women earned her a Guggenheim Fellowship in 1999, enabling her to develop the work that resulted in her first major monograph, Regarding Emma: Photographs of American Women and Girls (Center for American Places, 2003). Since that time, Pinney has continued to follow those narratives, and the themes contained within them. This is an extensive body of work, some of which was shown at the Art Institute of Chicago in 2008 and at Alan Klotz Gallery in 2007 and 2009. Girl Ascending, the full span of this second phase in Pinney's project, was published by the Columbia College Press in January 2010.

== Biography ==
=== Early life and education ===
Melissa Ann Pinney was born in St Louis, Missouri, the fourth of William Thomas Pinney and Mary Ann Hilburn Pinney's eight children. A year after her birth the Pinneys moved to Scarsdale, New York. Six years later they moved to Palo Alto, California and then in 1961 to Evanston, Illinois. Pinney was brought up as a Catholic and attended high school at the Convent of the Sacred Heart, a private academy for girls in Chicago. She went on to attend Manhattanville College– also a Sacred Heart school– in Purchase, NY, and then earned a BFA in Photography from Columbia College Chicago in 1977. Pinney earned her MFA in Photography from the University of Illinois at Chicago in 1988.

=== Influences ===
Early on, Pinney was inspired by the photographs of Dorothea Lange and Robert Frank, by the portraits of Julia Margaret Cameron and the street photography of Garry Winogrand and Helen Levitt. In addition to these 20th century artists, the iconography of the Christian religious paintings from Pinney's Catholic girlhood are the foundational images of her art.

=== Early portraits ===
Pinney's first work to gain attention was a series of costumed black and white portraits of her female friends, made in locations around Chicago. These pictures were first exhibited in Breath of Vision: Portfolios of Women Photographers, at Fashion Institute of Technology Galleries in New York City in 1975.

In 1978 Pinney exhibited her Portraits of Evanston Artists at the Evanston Art Center, followed by series of large black and white portraits of family and friends, "Remembrances." The exhibition opened at the Chicago Cultural Center in 1982 and travelled to the Illinois State Museum in Springfield, Illinois, in 1983.

=== 1980s street work ===
In graduate school, Pinney moved on from the medium-format portraits that had characterized her work, to pictures made in the flux of life on the streets of Chicago. Her first project in this manner were pictures made during the summer of 1983 at the Hamlin Park swimming pool, followed by a series of street carnivals shot mostly at night, images of her parents and siblings in Florida, and the beaches of Sarasota and Miami. By the mid-1980s Pinney had acquired her first Leica Camera.

=== The Feminine Identity Series (1985–95) ===
Throughout the 1980s, Pinney supported herself by working as a photo-assistant and stylist for commercial still and motion photographers. She accepted commissions photographing weddings and parties, and started shooting in color for these jobs. Photographs of brides, their mothers and attendants made during these wedding assignments signaled the beginning of the "Feminine Identity Series". Images from this series were included in Museum of Modern Art's 1991 exhibition curated by Peter Galassi, Pleasures & Terrors of Domestic Comfort.

=== Regarding Emma (2003) ===
In 2003, Pinney's first monograph, Regarding Emma: Photographs of American Women & Girls, (With a Foreword by Ann Patchett), was published by The Center for American Places. For nearly twenty years, Melissa Ann Pinney had photographed girls and women, from infancy to old age, to portray how feminine identity is constructed, taught, and communicated. Her work depicted the rites of American womanhood-- a prom, a wedding, a baby shower, a tea party, and the informal passages of girlhood: combing a doll's hair, doing laundry with a mother, smoking a cigarette at a state fair. With each view, we gain a greater understanding of the connections between mother and daughter, and by extension the larger world of family, friends, and society. Pinney's approach to interpreting girlhood became more complicated and complex when her daughter, Emma, was born in 1995. Emma's childhood evoked in Pinney her own girlhood and gave her work new meaning and purpose. Ultimately, Regarding Emma shares with all of us the incremental and the ritualistic changes that take place in a woman's life over time.

=== Ballroom Dance Series (2007–10) ===
These pictures of young people negotiating their first formal events were made during Ballroom Dance Class at the Woman's Athletic Club, a graduation dance at the Hilton Chicago and B'nai Mitzvah parties in Chicago and Evanston.

=== Girl Ascending (2010) ===
Girl Ascending (With a Foreword by David Travis) was published by The Center for American Places at Columbia College Chicago in 2010. The work in Girl Ascending focuses on a touchstone moment in the lives of American girls and women: their emergence from protected youth to public maturity. In these pictures Pinney portrays the uneasiness of that emergence in the struggle to fit ideal dresses to real bodies, proper etiquette to ebullient energies and appetites, natural companionship to formal conversation as the girls prepare themselves for the rest of their lives. Girl Ascending can be seen as a continuation of Pinney's widely praised first book, Regarding Emma: Photographs of American Women and Girls. "The strength of Pinney's work has always lain in her ability to sympathetically inhabit the lives of her subjects, while understanding their place in the larger ebb and flow of social life around them," photographic and cultural historian Peter Bacon Hales has written. "The pictures are so often gorgeous in their manner, and heartbreaking in their implications; rarely do we see photographs that can imply so much without intruding or announcing their intentions. A major contribution to neo-documentary photography, Melissa Ann Pinney's Girl Ascending confirms her place among the top rank of photographers working in the new century." As David Travis writes in his introduction, "Pinney has regained that sense of wonder, making her view of girls ascending into young women both believable and enchanting".

=== Cellar Door Series (2001–2016) ===
Pinney made the first picture in the Cellar Door Series in May 2001. After celebrating her daughter Emma's sixth birthday with a backyard party, Emma climbed up on the old cellar door. Pinney was inspired by Alfred Stieglitz's 1921 portrait of Georgia Engelhard to make a picture. Afterward, Pinney decided to continue the project, at first once a year and then once every season or so. Emma is now twenty one years old; the photographs span over a decade from 2001 to 2016 and continuing.

=== TWO (2015) ===
TWO, edited and introduced by Ann Patchett demonstrates the duality in our relationships and in the world that surrounds us. The photographs are of pairs—mostly, but not always human—that display or imply elusive connections of mind, of spirit, or of simply of the act of being. Photographs include children at play, aging friends, parent and child, couples in love, two nesting tea cups, twin teen-age boys, two chairs in autumn, among many others. The photographs are laid out in short sequences, with an essay placed between each sequence. The essays by the contemporary writers, Billy Collins, Edwidge Danticat, Elizabeth Gilbert, Allan Gurganus, Jane Hamilton, Barbara Kingsolver, Elizabeth McCracken, Maile Meloy, Susan Orlean, and Richard Russo.

=== Becoming Themselves (2018–present) ===
Photographs of students of Bell School of the Chicago Public Schools system in 2018, followed by Ogden International High School and Senn High School from 2019 to present.

== Awards ==
- 1980 Illinois Arts Council Project Completion Grant
- 1981 Illinois Arts Council Project Completion Grant
- 1987 Changing Chicago Documentary Project, Chicago, IL
- 1987 Community Arts Assistance Program, Chicago, IL
- 1987 Illinois Arts Council Artists Fellowship Award
- 1987 National Endowment for the Arts, Midwest Regional Fellowship
- 1989 Illinois Arts Council Artists Fellowship Award
- 1992 Chicago Women in Philanthropy, Macarthur foundation
- 1997 LaSalle National Bank, Chicago Marathon Project Commission
- 1999 John Simon Guggenheim Fellowship
- 2006 Photography Now: One Hundred Portfolios
- 2007 Illinois Arts Council Fellowship Award
- 2011 Forward Thinking Museum, Photography Award Winner
- 2012 Nominee, Anonymous Was A Woman Award

== Selected permanent collections ==
- Art Institute of Chicago
- Amon Carter Museum of American Art. Fort Worth, TX
- Bank of America Collection, Chicago, IL
- Center for Creative Photography
- Chicago History Museum
- Columbus Museum of Art
- DeCordova Museum and Sculpture Park
- George Eastman Museum
- Illinois State Museum
- International Center of Photography
- J. Paul Getty Museum
- Metropolitan Museum of Art
- Milwaukee Museum of Art, Milwaukee, WI
- Museum of Contemporary Art, Chicago
- Museum of Fine Arts, Boston
- Museum of Fine Arts, Houston
- Museum of Modern Art
- Portland Art Museum
- San Francisco Museum of Modern Art
- Smith College Museum of Art
- Saint Louis Art Museum
- Whitney Museum of American Art

== Selected exhibitions ==
- "Closer Look at TWO" (2015) Solo Exhibit. Schneider Gallery, Chicago, Illinois
- "Girls of Summer" (2014) Solo Exhibit. Winton Bell Gallery, Brown University. Providence, Rhode Island
- "The Gender Show", (2013) Group Exhibition. George Eastman Museum, Rochester, New York
- "Girl Ascending", (2010) Solo Exhibit, Utah Museum of Contemporary Art, Salt Lake City, Utah
- "Recent Work" (2007 and 2009) Solo Exhibit, Alan Klotz Gallery, New York City, New York
- "Girls on the Verge" (2008) Group Exhibition. Art Institute of Chicago, Chicago, Illinois
- "Inside Out: Portrait Photographs from the Permanent Collection," (2004) Group Exhibition. Whitney Museum of American Art, New York City, New York
- "Contemporary Photographs", (2003) Group Exhibition. Metropolitan Museum of Art, New York City, New York
- "Pleasures and Terrors of Domestic Comfort," Museum of Modern Art, New York City, New York

== Publications ==
- Pinney, Melissa Ann (2023). In Their Own Light: Photographs from Chicago Public Schools. Skylark Editions. ISBN 978-0-9973859-6-0.
- Pinney, Melissa Ann; Patchett, Ann (2015). Two. Harper Design. ISBN 978-0062334428.
- Pinney, Melissa Ann; Travis, David (2011). Girl Ascending. Center for American Places. ISBN 978-1935195115.
- Pinney, Melissa Ann; Patchett, Ann (2003). Regarding Emma: Photographs of American Women and Girls. Center for American Places. ISBN 1930066147.
- Galassi, Peter (1991). Pleasures and Terrors of Domestic Comfort. Museum of Modern Art. ISBN 0870701924.
- Moura, Sophie (June 20, 2011). "Starvation Nation: Inside a Groundbreaking Eating Disorder Facility". Marie Claire.
- Flanagan, Caitlin (October 21, 2011). "Girls, Interrupted". New York Times Magazine.
- Pesta, Abigail (March 19, 2009). "I Survived Prison: What Really Happens Behind Bars". Marie Claire.
- Jones, Tamara (November 19, 2008). "Why I Went AWOL". Marie Claire.
- Kirp, David L. (July 23, 2006). "After the Bell Curve". New York Times Magazine.
- Pinney, Melissa Ann (October 2012). "What Makes My Life Real Simple". Real Simple Magazine.
- Booth, Stephanie (July 2012). "Sole Sisters". Real Simple Magazine.
- Hager Cohen, Leah (September 30, 2007). "Absent Mothers". New York Times.
- Reeves, Hope (October 19, 2003). "Two Lives to Give". New York Times.
- Merkin, Daphne (June 18, 2006). "Daddy's Forgotten Girl". New York Times Magazine.
- Saint Louis, Catherine (January 27, 2002). "The Way We Live Now: What Were They Thinking?". New York Times Magazine.
