= Maria Gaspar =

American artist and educator

- Born: 1980 (age 45–46); Chicago, Illinois
- Education: BFA Pratt Institute, MFA University of Illinois at Chicago
- Known for: Installation art, Sculpture, Performance art, Social Practice
- Notable work: Radioactive: Stores from Beyond the Wall, Unblinking Eyes, Watching, Sounds for Liberation, 96 Acres Project, Brown Brilliance Darkness Matter, On the Border of What is Formless and Monstrous
- Awards: Latinx Artist Fellowship; Guggenheim Fellowship in the Creative Arts; United States Artists Fellowship; Art Matters Award; Robert Rauschenberg Artist As Activist Fellowship; Creative Capital Award; Joan Mitchell Emerging Artist Grant; National Endowment for the Arts; Sor Juana Women of Achievement Award, National Museum of Mexican Art

Maria Gaspar (born 1980) is an American interdisciplinary artist and educator.

Her works have been exhibited at venues including the MoMA PS1 in New York, Pérez Art Museum Miami, Florida, Museum of Contemporary Art located in Chicago, Artspace in New Haven, CT, African American Museum, Philadelphia, PA, University of California, Santa Cruz, and many others. Gaspar's work has been written about in the New York Times Magazine, Artforum, The Chicago Tribune, Hyperallergic, and many other publications.

== Early life and education ==
Gaspar was born in Little Village, a neighbourhood on the West Side of Chicago in 1980. The Little Village neighbourhood is home to one of the largest Mexican American communities in the United States. She is first-generation to parents who migrated from Mexico to Chicago's West Side in the 1960's. Her mother was a teacher’s aide and professional clown and later went on to be a community-radio DJ in Little Village at a station called WCYC that was part of the Boys & Girls Club. Gaspar has stated in numerous interviews that her mother's work has deeply influenced her art. She attended Whitney M. Young Magnet High School, which had a strong art department, and started her public art career painting community murals. Gaspar travelled the city of Chicago to work with local muralists, observing different neighbourhoods and communities. She received a BFA from Pratt Institute in 2002 and in 2009 she received an MFA from the University of Illinois at Chicago.

== Cook County Jail ==
Cook County Jail is located in South Lawndale, Chicago, Illinois and is known to be the third-largest jail system in the United States. Little Village, the neighbourhood which Gaspar grew up in, was primarily taken up by the corrections facility. Gaspar's work was heavily influenced by the jail and how it disproportionately affected Black and Brown families. The first piece Gaspar completed connected to the jail was Cook County Jail: The Visible and Invisible. Gaspar created an audio documentary including Little Village residents and their experience living next to Cook County Jail. With her project, Unblinking Eyes, Watching, Gaspar printed images of the jail and plastered them on the wall of the Chicago Cultural Center. With her work Radioactive: Stories from Beyond the Wall, Gaspar collaborated with incarcerated individuals in the corrective facility to invite the public within the jail walls. This project used the voices of those affected by incarceration to create discussions around the systems of power within incarceration as well as the influence of geography. This project took what was overlooked and made it visible to others. Gaspar's work about Cook County Jail forced the viewer to consider the presence of the site and its connection and power it had to residents.

== Notable works ==
Gaspar's most profound pieces focus on community collaboration. Gaspar continually emphasizes the power of place in her work.

The 96 Acres Project is one of Gaspar's most ambitious projects, created between 2012–2016. This multi-year, multimedia work produced eight site-responsive public actions, collaborating with youth, teachers, activists, officials, and incarcerated individuals of Cook County Jail. Gaspar had to facilitate these collaborations, negotiate for and with these individuals and advocate for them. The focus of this project was for the community to understand and consider incarceration, how it disproportionately impacts people of color, and the influence of prisons in impoverished neighbourhoods.

In Radioactive: Stories from Beyond the Wall, Gaspar collaborated with incarcerated individuals. Created from 2016–2018, Gaspar led workshops within Cook County Jail to produce audio art with incarcerated individuals. The final piece of the project was broadcast on the outside walls of the jail, showing the public the inner lives of the incarcerated. The goal of this project was to represent those who had been historically marginalized, pulling apart pre-conceived notions of those inside prisons.

Gaspar's most recent project, Compositions, created in 2023, utilized Cook County Jail in a new manner. Gaspar used debris salvaged from the demolition of a wing of Cook County Jail to create this exhibition, showing how these items that built the jail represent unfreedom. This project questions the role, consequences and permanence of prisons, representing abolotionist goals. This project uses multimedia production, from sculptures to audios to show themes of abolition, transformation and renewal.

== Career ==
Gaspar's body of work has received numerous awards including a 2022 John Simon Guggenheim Fellowship, a 2015 Creative Capital Award, and a 2016 Robert Rauschenberg Artist as Activist Fellowship, amongst many others. Gaspar is an Associate Professor of Contemporary Practices at School of the Art Institute of Chicago. Gaspar has served on the MacArthur Foundation’s Chicago Commitment Team, the Art for Justice Fund’s Advisory Council and is currently a member of Chicago’s Advisory Committee for the Memorials and Monuments Assessment Project.

== Selected solo exhibitions ==
- Compositions (solo), 2023, Institute of the Arts and Sciences, UC Santa Cruz, Santa Cruz, CA
- Force of Things (solo), 2023, El Museo Del Barrio, New York, NY
- Brown Brilliance Darkness Matter (solo), 2016, National Museum of Mexican Art, Chicago, IL
- On the Border of What Is Formless and Monstrous, 2016, Experimental Sound Studio, Chicago, IL
- Into Body Into Wall, 2015, Jane Addams Hull House Museum, Chicago, IL
- Gaspar/Hall, 2013, The Franklin, Chicago, IL
- All That Also Means To See (solo), 2011, Woman Made Gallery, Chicago, IL
- Maria Gaspar/Helene Maureen Cooper: New Work, 2010, Dominican University, River Forest, IL
- Oblation for A Parade (solo), 2009, UBS 12 x 12 New Artists/New Work, Museum of Contemporary Art, Chicago

== Notable works ==
- At the Same Time, One and Many (2023)
- Unblinking Eyes, Awaiting (2023)
- Clamour (2022)
- Soy Paz, Soy Más (2020)
- Feedback (2019)
- Unblinking Eyes, Watching (2019)
- Brown Brilliance Darkness Matter (2016)
- Haunting Raises Specters (by A.G.) (2015)
- City As Site (2010)
- Radioactive: Stories from Beyond the Wall (2016-2018)
- Sounds for Liberation
- Cook County Jail: The Visible and Invisible (2013)
- The 96 Acres Project (2012–2016)
- On the Border of What is Formless and Monstrous

== Awards ==
- 2022 Latinx Artist Fellowship
- 2022 Guggenheim Fellowship
- 2021 United States Artists Fellowship
- 2020 Frieze Impact Prize
- 2020 Art Matters Grant
- 2018 Imagining Justice Art Grant
- 2017 Art Matters Grant
- 2017 Chamberlain Award for Social Practice at the Headlands Center for the Arts
- 2016 Robert Rauschenberg Artist as Activist Fellowship
- 2015 Creative Capital Award
- 2015 Joan Mitchell Emerging Artist Grant
- Chicagoan of the Year in the Arts in 2014 by art critic and historian, Lori Waxman
- 2008 Sor Juana Women of Achievement Award in Art and Activism from the National Museum of Mexican Art
