= Cypecore =

German melodic death metal band

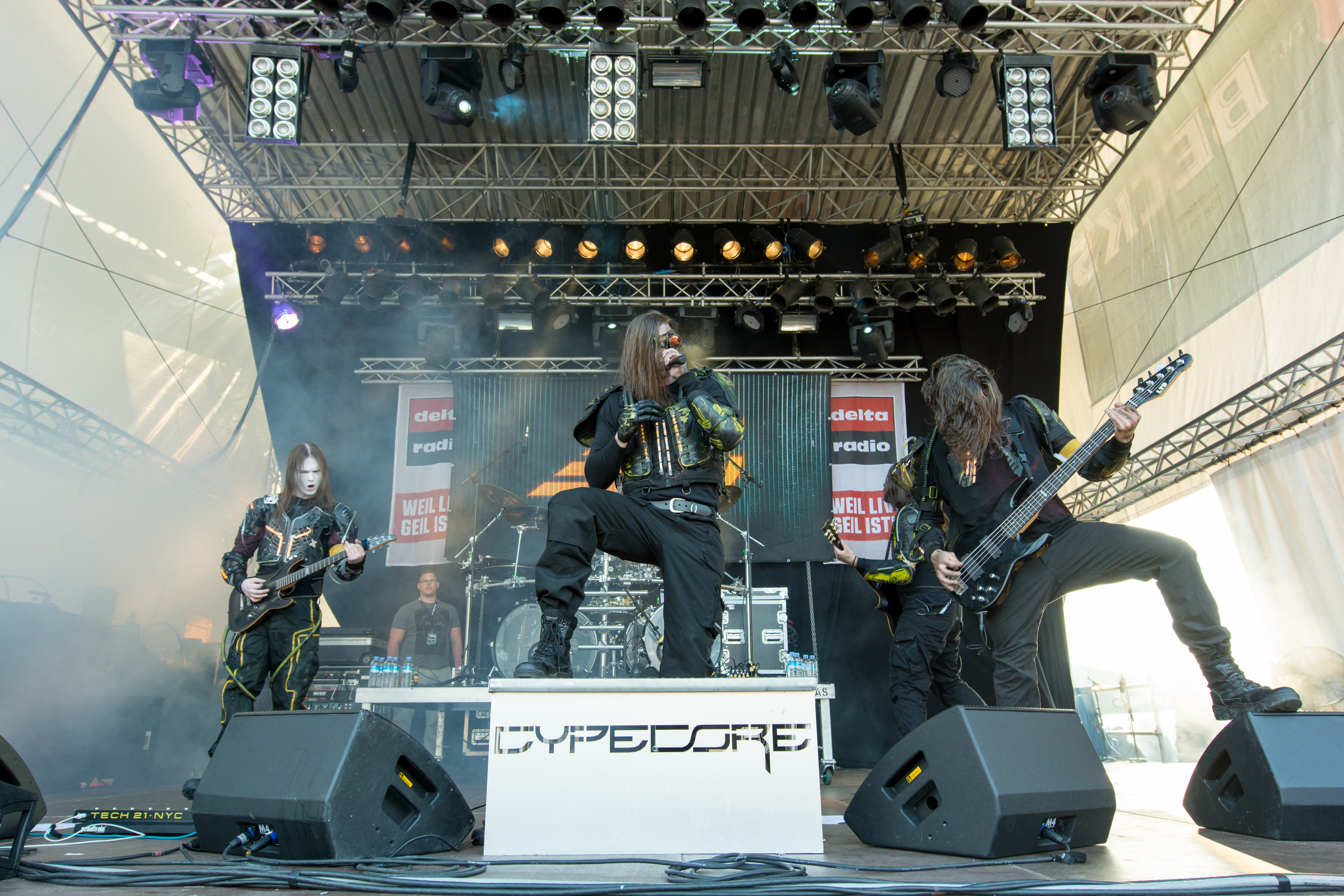
- Cypecore 2017

Background information
- Origin: Mannheim, Germany
- Genres: Melodic death metal; groove metal; thrash metal; cyber metal; industrial metal
- Years active: 2007–present
- Label: Independent
- Members: Dominic Christoph; Nils Lesser; Pascal Olejnik; Simon Schröder
- Past members: Evan K Attila Erdélyi; Lucas Amadeus Buttendorf; Christoph Rogdakis; Tobias Derer; Chris Heckel; Jay Marsman
- Website: cypecore.com

Cypecore is a German melodic death metal band from Mannheim. They were formed in 2007 and have released five studio albums.

== Band members ==
=== Current line-up ===
- Nils "Alchemist" Lesser – guitar (2007–present)
- Dominic "Commander" Christoph – vocals (2015–present)
- Pascal "Mechanic" Olejnik – guitar (2021–present)
- Simon "Ex09" Schröder – drums (2023–present)

=== Previous members ===
- Lucas "Luggey" Amadeus Buttendorf – drums (2007–2012)
- Christoph "Greek" Rogdakis – guitar (2007–2015)
- Attila "Azge" Erdélyi – vocals (2007–2015; died 2022)
- Chris Heckel – bass (2007–2018; died 2018)
- Tobias "Ex07" Derer – drums (2011–2017)
- Evan K – guitar (2015-2017)
- Sebastian "Ex09" Unic – drums (2017–2021)
- Jay Marsman – guitar (2017–2021)
- Johannes "Ex08" Kochs – drums (2021–2023)
Cypecore, Band members at Rockharz 2026

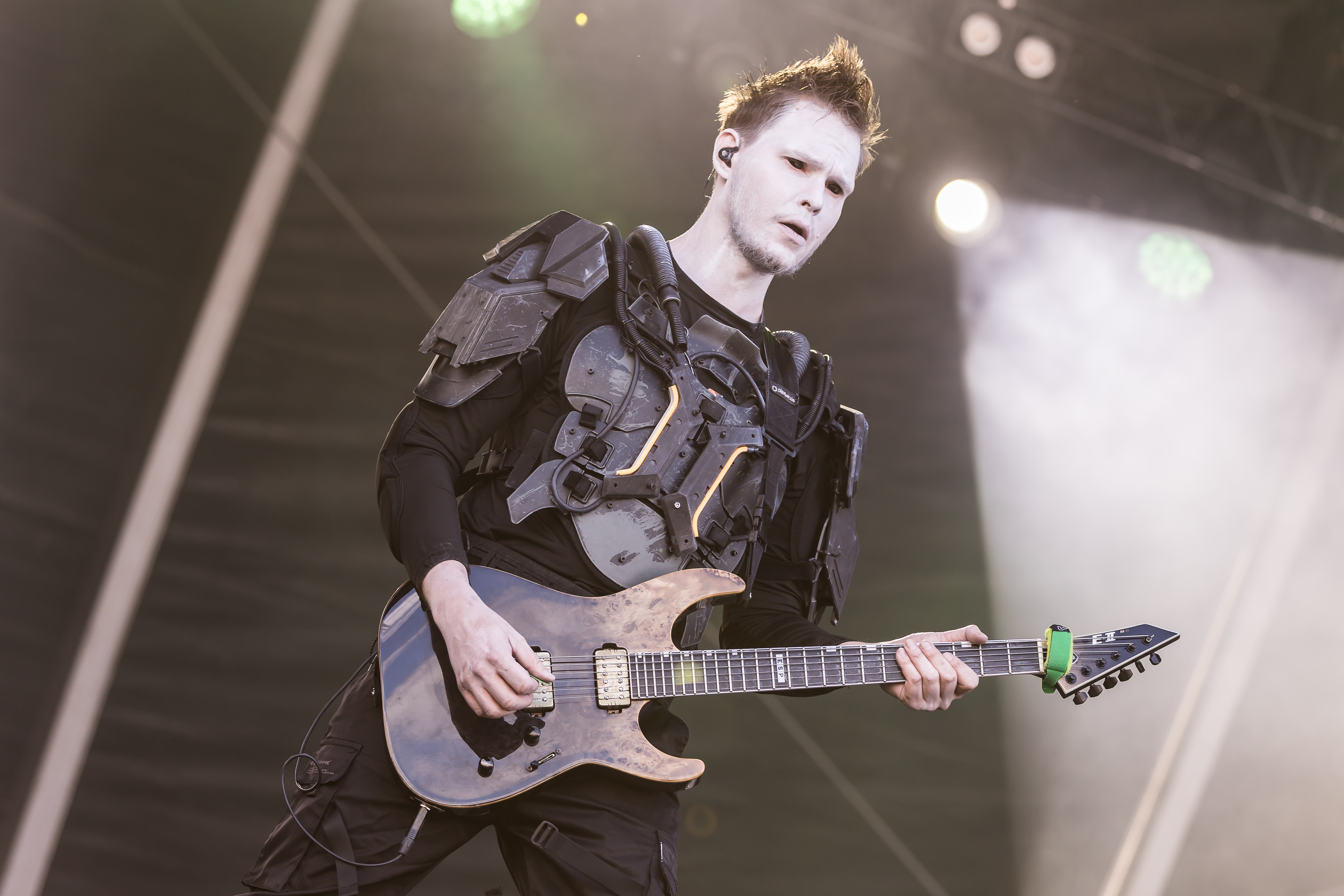
Nils "Nelson" Lesser, guitars

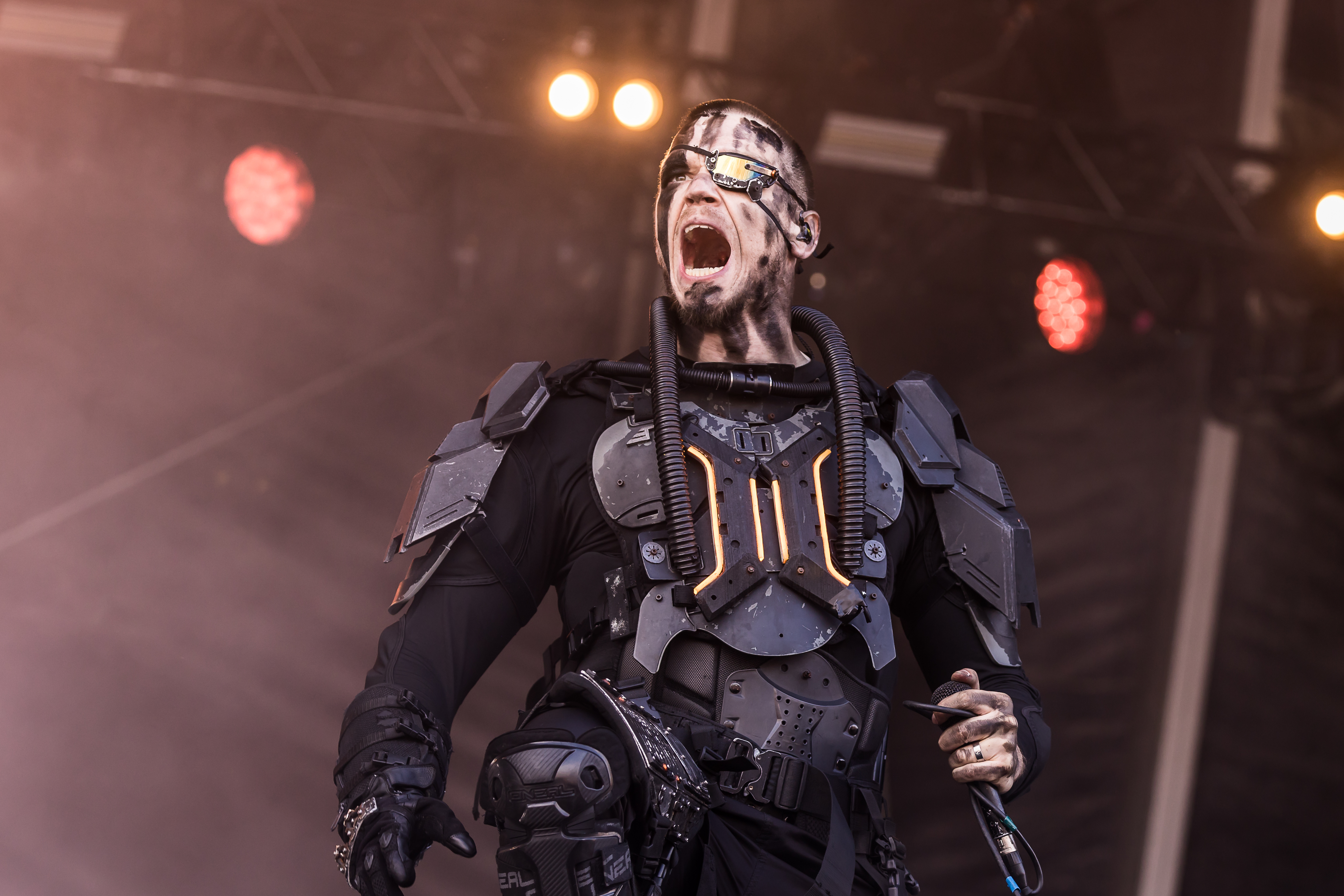
Dominic Christoph, vocals

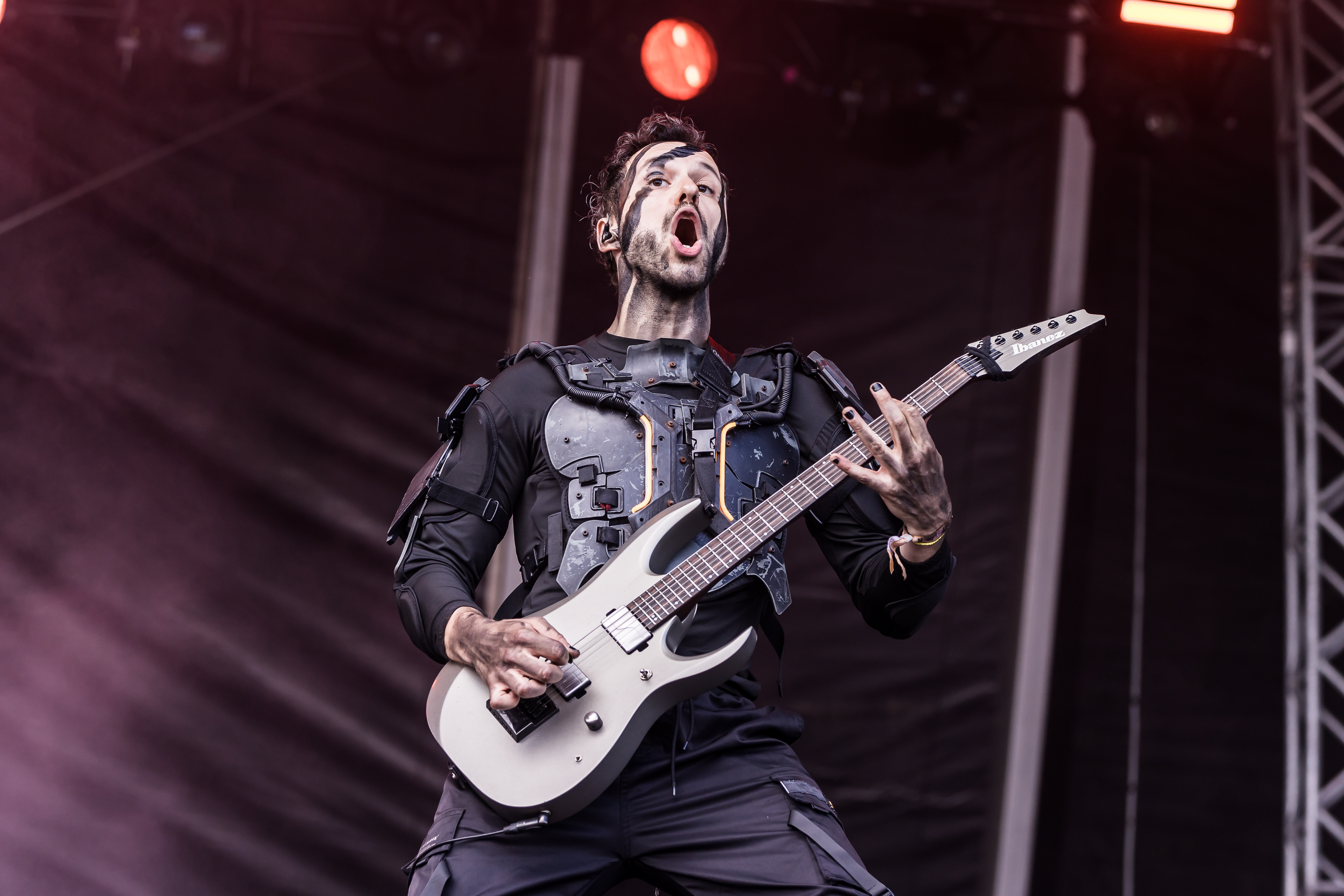
Pascal Olejnik, guitars

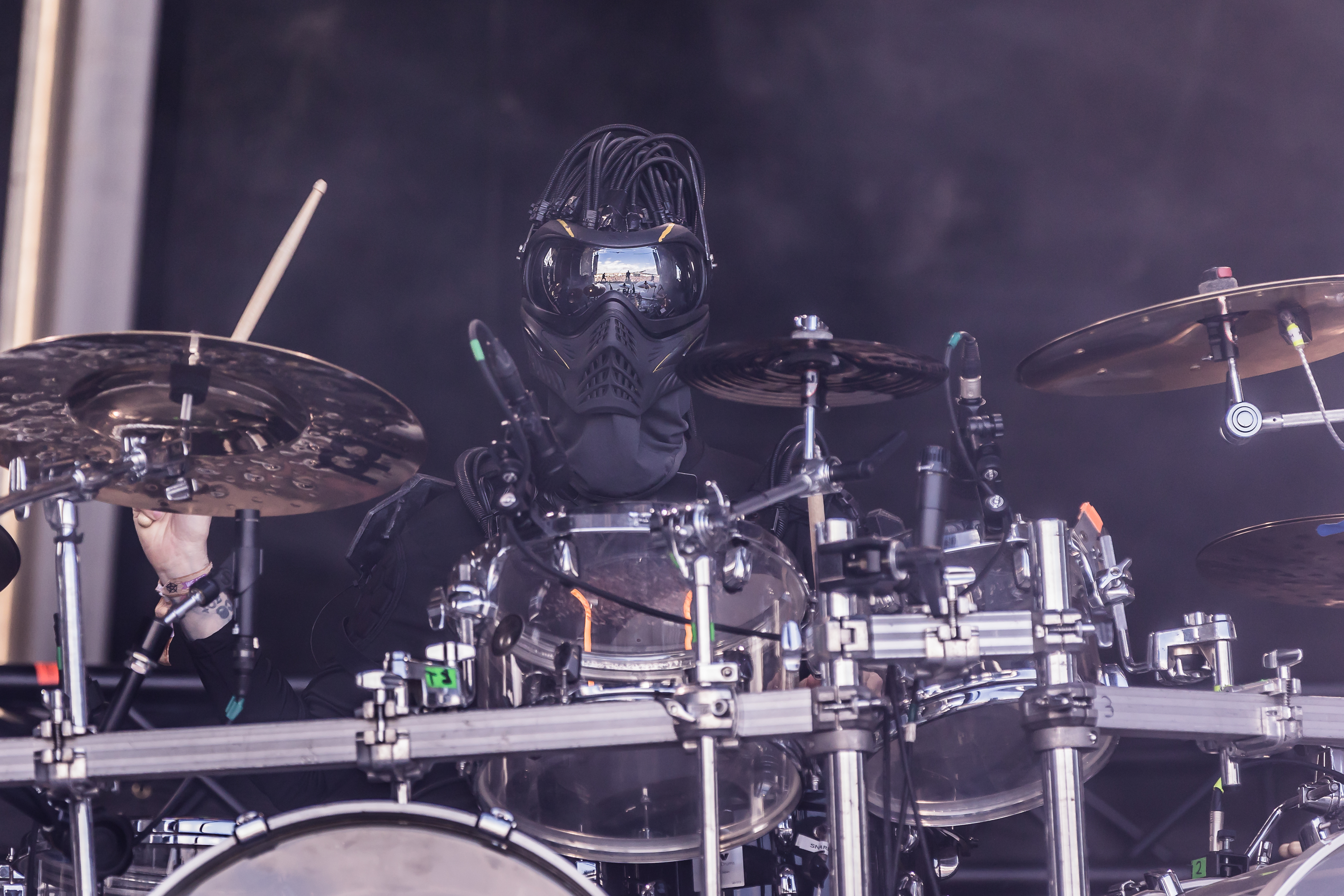
Sebastian Unic, drums

== Discography ==
=== Studio albums ===
- Innocent (2008)
- Take the Consequence (2010)
- Identity (2016)
- The Alliance (2018)
- Make Me Real (2024)

=== EPs ===
- Version 4.5: The Dark Chapter (2023)

=== Singles ===
- "The Hills Have Eyes" (2014)
- "My Confession" (2014)
- "Identity" (2015)
- "The Alliance" (2018)
- "Dissatisfactory" (2018)
- "Chosen Chaos" (2021)
- "Spirals" (2022)
- "Rise" (2022)
- "Liquid Fire" (2023)
- "I'll Be Back" (2023)
- "Neoteric Gods" (2023)
- "Patient Zero" (2023)
- "Make Me Real" (2024)
