= Exit Eden =

Multinational symphonic metal band

- Origin: Flushing, Michigan, U.S.
- Genre: Symphonic metal
- Years active: 2017–present
- Labels: Starwatch Entertainment; Napalm Records
- Members: Anna Brunner; Clémentine Delauney; Marina La Torraca
- Past members: Amanda Somerville
- Website: www.exit-eden.com

Exit Eden is a symphonic metal group that performs cover versions of well-known pop and rock songs, as well as releasing original songs (starting with their second album "Femmes Fatales").

== History ==
The band was formed in 2017 by the American singer Amanda Somerville (Avantasia, Epica, HDK, Kiske/Somerville, Aina, Trillium), the Brazilian singer Marina La Torraca (Battle Beast, ex-Phantom Elite), the French singer Clémentine Delauney (Visions of Atlantis, Temperance, ex-Serenity) and the German-American singer Anna Brunner (League of Distortion). The band started posting in July 2017, in YouTube the first metal-cover clips from their debut album Rhapsodies in Black, which reached thousands of views within a few days and hit No. 15 in the German album charts.

Several musicians, sound engineers and producers from the metal scene, like Simone Simons (Epica), Hardy Krech, Mark Nissen, Johannes Braun (Kissin' Dynamite), Jim Müller (Kissin' Dynamite), Sascha Paeth (Avantasia, Edguy, Kamelot), Evan K (Enemy Inside, Mystic Prophecy) have cooperated for the album release. Live musicians have included Evan K (guitars) and Mark Moody (keyboards)

On 20 October 2023, Somerville released a statement, in which she announced new material for an upcoming release and that she would step down from the band to focus on her three children. The other members confirmed that they will continue without replacing her. Four days later, Exit Eden released their new single "Run!" featuring Marco Hietala. Femme Fatales, the band's second studio album was released on January 12, 2024 and contained the band's own songs for the first time.

== Band members ==
Current

- Anna Brunner – vocals (2017–present)
- Clémentine Delauney – vocals (2017–present)
- Marina La Torraca – vocals (2017–present)

Former

- Amanda Somerville – vocals (2017–2023)

== Discography ==
=== Studio albums ===
- Rhapsodies in Black (2017)
- Femmes Fatales (2024)

=== Music videos ===
- 2017: Unfaithful (Rihanna cover) (Starwatch Entertainment/Napalm Records)
- 2017: Impossible (Shontelle cover) (Starwatch Entertainment/Napalm Records)
- 2017: Incomplete (Backstreet Boys cover) (Starwatch Entertainment/Napalm Records)
- 2017: Paparazzi (Lady Gaga cover) (Starwatch Entertainment/Napalm Records)
- 2017: Total Eclipse of the Heart (Bonnie Tyler cover) (Starwatch Entertainment/Napalm Records)
- 2017: A Question of Time (Depeche Mode cover) (Starwatch Entertainment/Napalm Records)
- 2023: Run! (featuring Marko Hietala) (Napalm Records)
- 2023: Separate Ways (Journey cover) (Napalm Records)
- 2024: Femme Fatale (Napalm Records)
- 2024: Désenchantée (Mylène Farmer cover) (Napalm Records)
