= Sylencer =

American thrash metal band

- Origin: Chicago, Illinois, U.S.
- Genres: Thrash metal, heavy metal
- Years active: 2006–present
- Labels: Sylencer Records
- Members: Markus Johansson; Kevin Talley
- Past members: Johnny Rox

Sylencer is an American thrash metal band from Chicago, formed in 2006 by Markus Johansson (vocals, guitar) and Johnny Rox (bass guitar). During recording of their debut album, A Lethal Dose of Truth, the band recruited drummer Kevin Talley on a session basis, although he became a full-time member in 2012.

== History ==
In the summer of 2004, Markus Johansson sent a message to Johnny Rox via the Megadeth message boards, to see if he would like to get together and jam. After working together on various projects for the next two years, the pair set out to record what would ultimately become the Sylencer debut album. By May 2006, the tracking of their debut album began, with Sylencer recruiting drummer Kevin Talley, and lead guitarist Larry Tarnowski to round out the recording lineup. As the majority of the album was recorded by years end, hard economic times started to befall the band. But refusing to give up on the album, Markus and Johnny used their downtime to slowly but surely recruit more guests to the album's lineup, which grew to include members of Dream Theater, Anthrax, Dethklok, and nearly a dozen others.

As years passed and things for Sylencer started to rebound, they found themselves in a position to finally complete their debut accompanied by session members Talley (now a full member) and Larry Tarnowski, the album soon turned into a full collaborative effort with a large number of established heavy metal musicians contributing to the effort, including Dethklok's Gene Hoglan and Brendon Small, The Heathen (of Zimmers Hole, with Hoglan), Rob Caggiano (Anthrax, The Damned Things) and Jordan Rudess (Dream Theater), amongst others.

In December 2011, the band landed a licensing and distribution deal with dPulse Recordings/Ovrtone Music Group, Inc. in association with Sony Music Entertainment Germany. This led to the album's finally receiving a release date, September 4, 2012, some six years since the project's start. 2012 also saw the addition of drummer Kevin Talley as a permanent member of the band, as well as the founding of the band's label, Sylencer Records, Inc., which is handling the album's release in tandem with dPulse Recordings, and Sony Music Entertainment Germany. Upon the release of their debut album, "A Lethal Dose Of Truth," the band intends to take to road and tour just as relentlessly as they pursued their album's completion. On April 17, 2013, the band announced that a number of guest appearances for their sophomore album have been confirmed, including current and former members of Chimaira, Jag Panzer, King Diamond, Death, Forbidden, Korn and Megadeth.

== Members ==
Full lineup

- Markus Johansson – vocals, bass, guitars
- Kevin Talley – drums, percussion

Session members

- Larry Tarnowski – lead guitar

Guests on A Lethal Dose of Truth

- Gene Hoglan – drums
- Brendon Small – lead guitar
- Andy LaRocque – lead guitar
- Michael Angelo Batio – lead guitar
- Roland Grapow – lead guitar
- The Heathen – lead vocals
- Emil Werstler – lead guitar
- Rob Caggiano – lead guitar
- Metal Mike Chlasciak – lead guitar
- Steve Di Giorgio – bass
- Sean Reinert – drums
- Jordan Rudess – keyboards
- Steve Smyth – lead guitar
- Christian Lasegue – lead guitar
- Marco Minnemann – drums

== Discography ==
- A Lethal Dose of Truth (2012)
