= As Regret Becomes Guilt: The Demos of Arsis =

Compilation album by Arsis
- Released: December 28, 2007
- Studio: Max Trax
- Genre: Melodic death metal
- Length: 33:29
- Label: Negative-Existence Records
- Producer: Brett Portzer

Arsis chronology
United in Regret (2006)	As Regret Becomes Guilt: The Demos of Arsis (2007)	We Are the Nightmare (2008)

As Regret Becomes Guilt: The Demos of Arsis is a compilation album by American heavy metal band Arsis which was officially released on December 28, 2007 in both physical and digital formats via Negative-Existence Records. This release contains the band’s pre-A Celebration of Guilt recordings from 2001 and 2002, which led to Arsis signing with Willowtip Records in 2003.

Professional ratings
Review scores
Source	Rating
Sputnikmusic	3.4/5
Metal Storm	8.0/10
Rate Your Music	3.45/5

== Track listing ==
No.	Title	Length
1.	"Elegant and Perverse"	2:57
2.	"Wholly Night"	4:24
3.	"Worship Depraved"	3:06
4.	"Seven Whispers Fell Silent"	3:46
5.	"Veil of Mourning Black"	3:02
6.	"Fortune’s Envy"	2:57
7.	"Close"	3:50
8.	"Painted Eyes"	2:56
9.	"Elegant and Perverse (Unreleased Studio Take, 2002)"	2:33
10.	"Seven Whispers Fell Silent (Unreleased Studio Take, 2002)"	3:58

== Credits ==
=== Personnel ===
- James Malone - vocals, lead & rhythm guitar
- Kathy Burke - rhythm guitar (tracks 6–8)
- Scot Seguine - bass (tracks 6–8)
- Mike Van Dyne - drums

=== Production ===
- Brett Portzer - mixing, mastering
- Mark Riddick - artwork, layout
