= Kevin Talley =

American drummer

- Born: May 21, 1979 (age 47); San Antonio, Texas, U.S.
- Genres: Death metal; grindcore; metalcore; thrash metal; progressive metal
- Occupation: Musician
- Instrument: Drums
- Years active: 1998–present
- Member of: Sylencer; Feared
- Formerly of: Dååth; Six Feet Under; Nothnegal; Chimaira; Dying Fetus; Misery Index; Suffocation
- Website: drummerkevintalley.com

Kevin Talley (born May 21, 1979) is an American musician. He is the drummer for Sylencer and Feared. He was part of Dying Fetus, Misery Index, Six Feet Under, Nothnegal, Chimaira, Suffocation and Dååth, and toured with Battlecross in 2013.

== History ==
Talley filled in on drums with The Black Dahlia Murder after their touring drummer, Pierre Langlois, was denied entry into the States by his home country of Canada. He was a session drummer on Soils of Fate's 2003 release Crime Syndicate. He filled in with The Red Chord for their 2006 tour, and was also filling in with Hate Eternal for their 2006 North American tour, after Derek Roddy left the band for personal reasons. In May and June 1998, Kevin filled in the drum throne for Suffocation on their U.S. tour. Kevin also auditioned to be the drummer for Slayer after Paul Bostaph's departure in late 2001, but the job ultimately went to their original drummer, Dave Lombardo. Talley played on Chimaira's self-titled album and toured with them until early 2006. He now plays with Dååth and Nothnegal; in addition to this, he played drums in 2012 on the tracks titled "Cradle to Grave" and "Novus Ordo Seclorum" by Creative Waste. In 2019 he played drums on Nonvector's debut EP "A Short Trip Home".

== Personal life ==
Talley was born in San Antonio and lives there.

He collects Mexican newspapers.

== Discography ==
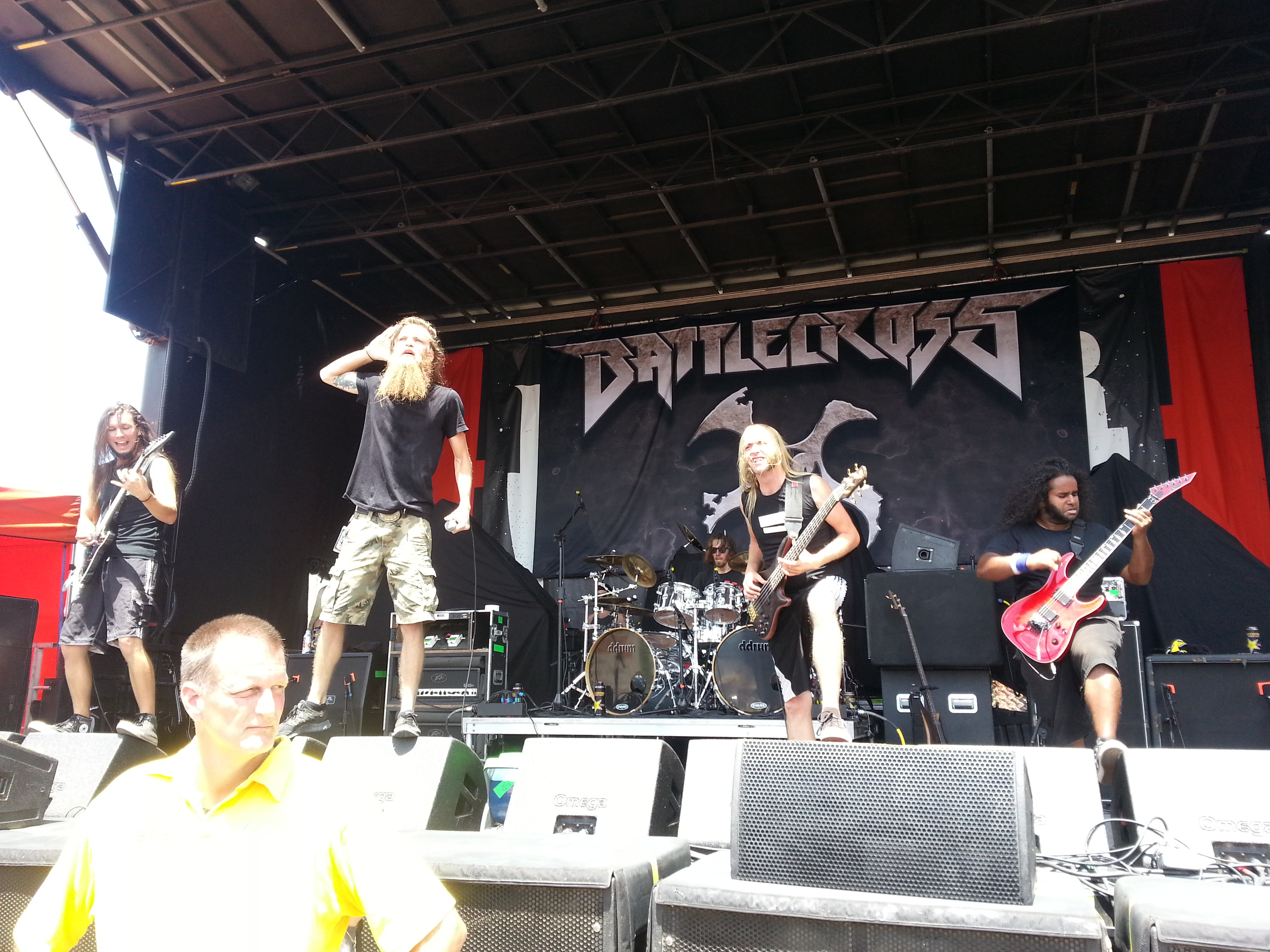
Talley performing at Mayhem Festival in Dallas, Texas with American heavy metal band Battlecross

- Absence of the Sacred - Come Hither O Herald of Death (2012)
- Dying Fetus – Killing on Adrenaline (1998)
- Dying Fetus – Grotesque Impalement (EP) (2000)
- Dying Fetus – Destroy the Opposition (2000)
- Misery Index – Overthrow (EP) (2001)
- Misery Index – split w/ Commit Suicide (album)|Split with Commit Suicide (EP) (2002)
- Soils of Fate – Crime Syndicate (2003)
- Misery Index – Dissent (EP) (2004)
- Chimaira – Chimaira (2005)
- Dååth – The Hinderers (2007)
- Dååth – The Concealers (2009)
- Dååth – Dååth (2010)
- Enders Game – What We've Lost (2010)
- Mike Chlasciak – The Metalworker (2011)
- Truth Corroded – Worship the Bled (2011)
- Science of Disorder – Heart, Blood and Tears... (2011)
- Nothnegal – Decadence (2012)
- Six Feet Under – Undead (2012)
- Sylencer – A Lethal Dose of Truth (2012)
- Darkrise – RealEyes (2013)
- Feared – "Furor Incarnatus" (2013)
- Six Feet Under – Unborn (2013)
- Acts of Tragedy – "Cursed Words" (2013) (Guest in "What Remains")
- Bleeding Utopia – Darkest Potency (2014)
- Omega Diatribe – Hydrozoan Periods (2014)
- Stardown – Void (2014)
- Misanthrope Monarch – "The Omega Embrace" | Single (2015)
- Omega Diatribe – Abstract Ritual (2015)
- Feared – Synder (2015)
- Collapse – In the Shadow of Man (2015)
- Heisenberg – The Empire Business (2017)
- JB Andrews – The Darkening (2017)
- Siriun – In Chaos We Trust (2018)
- Nonvector – A Short Trip Home (2019)
- Power Concept – Antropocentricity (2022)
