= Emil Werstler =

American guitarist

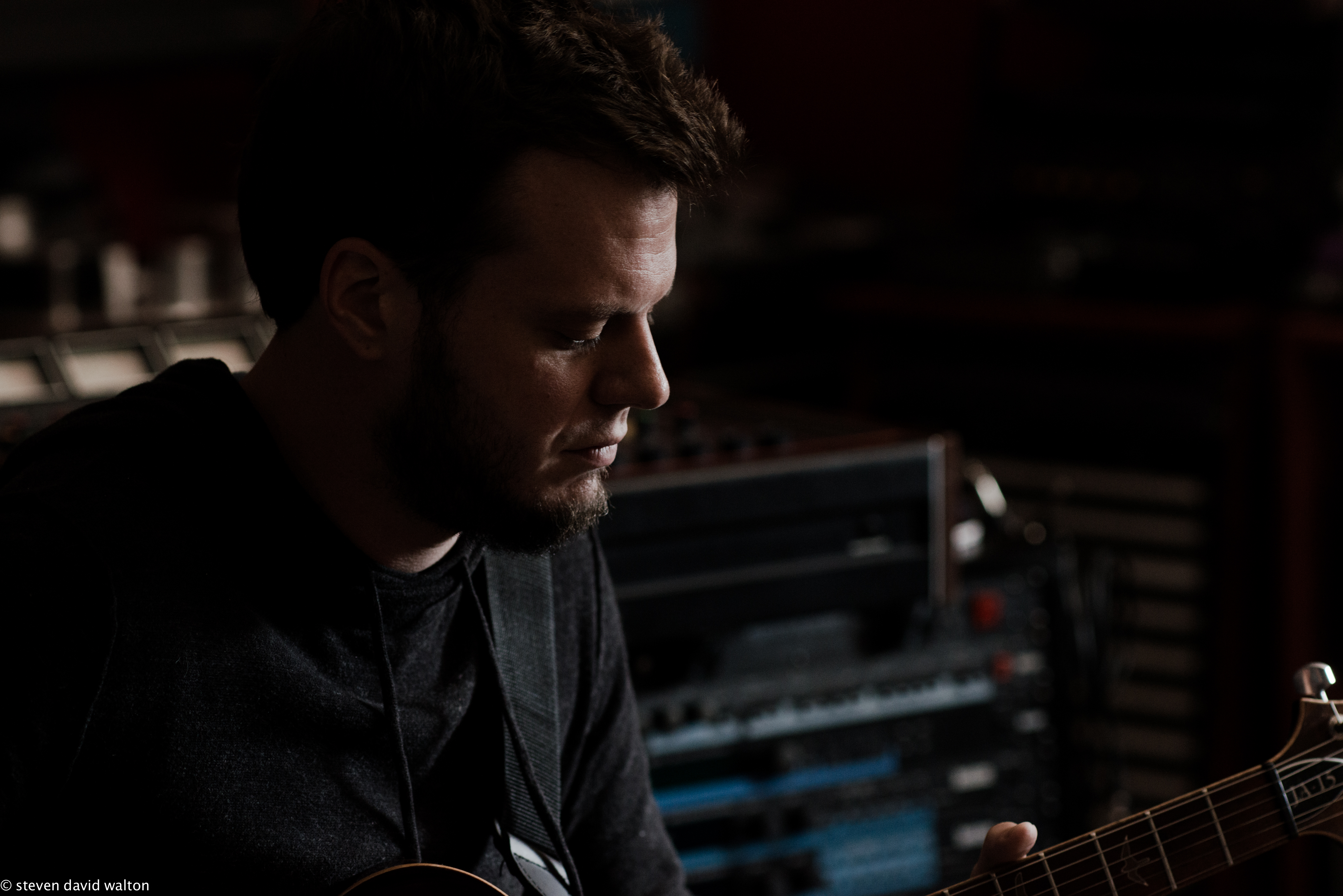
- Werstler in 2014

Background information
- Born: Alabama, U.S.
- Genres: Heavy metal; blues; jazz; experimental
- Occupations: Musician; composer
- Instrument: Guitar
- Years active: 2004–present
- Labels: Magna Carta Records; Roadrunner Records; Century Media; E1 Music
- Formerly of: Chimaira; Dååth; Levi/Werstler
- Website: emilwerstler.com

Emil Werstler is an American guitarist and musician based in Nashville, Tennessee who is perhaps best known for his work in metal and gypsy jazz. In 2004, Werstler became lead guitarist for the metal band Dååth, whose second album The Hinderers peaked at No. 49 on the Top Heatseekers chart in 2007. In 2009 Dååth released The Concealers on Roadrunner which reached No. 35 on Top Heatseekers and was placed as No. 3 on a list of the "top twenty metal albums of 2009" by Metal Sucks. In 2010 Werstler released the instrumental metal album Avalanche of Worms as a collaboration with Eyal Levi with the album receiving a largely positive response for its musicianship and experimental nature.

By 2011 Werstler had been confirmed as the new lead guitarist for the metal band Chimaira. With Werstler as a co-writer, Chimaira's final album Crown of Phantoms was released in 2013, reaching No. 52 on the Billboard 200 chart. Werstler announced his departure from Chimaira in late 2014, with the rest of the band dissolving shortly afterwards.

Since 2006 Werstler has worked with artists such as Arsis, Austrian Death Machine, Enders Game, Jason Bieler, Sylencer, The Agony Scene, Unearth, and Xerath. In 2018 Werstler launched his solo project Verlorener. In addition to teaching privately Emil has contributed to guitar publications such as Premier Guitar, Guitar World, and JamPlay. He releases content periodically on his YouTube channel, teaches clinics across the US, and has performed at various events including Experience PRS.

== Early life and education ==
Emil Werstler was born and raised in Alabama. He comes from a musically inclined family, and at a young age was exposed to diverse music by artists such as Stevie Wonder, Steely Dan, Mahavishnu Orchestra, and Led Zeppelin. At age six he began learning piano, an instrument he described being un-enthused about for the several years he attended lessons. At age twelve he began teaching himself guitar with a Washburn Lyon guitar and a ROSS keyboard amp, later stating that "I had no idea what a setup was nor did I even know there were guitars that were easier to play. I was just concerned about learning anything I could."

Early on he taught himself songs from heavy metal albums like Testament’s Low and Pantera’s Far Beyond Driven, and also "wound up really getting into more harmonically technical bands like Death and Cynic." As he grew further accustomed to other tracks, he developed an interest in the jazz recorded by artists such as Pat Martino. Self-taught on guitar throughout middle school and high school, Werstler began teaching the instrument at about age fifteen. At eighteen Werstler moved from Alabama to Atlanta, Georgia, to attend college at the Atlanta Institute of Music. While in college he took a break from playing metal to focus on older genres such as jazz and bebop.

== Career ==
=== Dååth early albums and live work (2004–2009) ===
While studying music in Atlanta, Werstler was introduced to metal musician Eyal Levi through a mutual friend. Though Werstler was not looking to focus on the metal genre in particular, he ended up giving Levi some guitar lessons. After some time passed, in 2004 Levi asked Werstler to join the death metal band Dååth, with Werstler taking on the role of co-lead guitarist. On April 25, 2004, Dååth self-released their debut album Futility, touring in support of the release.

While continuing to perform with Dååth, in 2006 Werstler was a guest guitar soloist on the Arsis album United in Regret. United in Regret received favorable reviews from press worldwide, including The Village Voice and Pop Matters.

Dååth's sophomore album The Hinderers was released on March 20, 2007, on Roadrunner Records, peaking at No. 49 on the Top Heatseekers chart. AllMusic gave the album a near-perfect score of 4.5/5, writing that "the intricately sculpted guitar collaborations of... Eyal Levi and instinctive lead guitar wunderkind Emil Werstler complement [co-founder Mike Kameron]'s considerable orchestrating abilities perfectly."

In 2008 Werstler was a guest guitar soloist on the track "Subzero" by Austrian Death Machine.

On April 21, 2009, Dååth released The Concealers on Roadrunner and Century Media. It peaked at No. 35 on the Top Heatseekers chart. A MetalSucks.com ranking by Vince Neilstein placed The Concealers as No. 3 on a list of the "top twenty metal albums of 2009," writing that "through Eyal Levi and Emil Werstler’s trained technique, The Concealers is musically interesting and extremely varied, too, a rarity in the realm of — for lack of a better way of describing it — commercially viable metal music."

With Dååth Werstler has performed live at festivals such as Ozzfest, and he was a fill-in musician for the band Unearth in 2009, taking the role of guitarist Buz McGrath.

American metal band Chimaira had Werstler fill in for Matt DeVries during a number of European tour dates in 2009, with Werstler helping support their album The Infection from September until October.

=== Levi/Werstler's Avalanche of Worms, studio work, and Dååth (2010) ===
"Avalanche of Worms is an incredibly unique and diverse piece of work... [Levi and Werstler push] the boundaries in several directions at once, taking elements of prog, metal, avant-garde, classical, jazz and experimentalism to varying heights both in their respective contexts and as a wild, yet listenable, cornucopia of styles."

— Ryan Ogle, Blabbermouth.net

During the break between the final tour for The Concealers album cycle and the writing sessions for the upcoming Dååth album, Eyal Levi and Werstler released a collaborative album entitled Avalanche of Worms on April 20, 2010. Magna Carta Records had first approached the duo about a collaboration after becoming familiar with their playing through the 2009 Guitars Ate My Brain compilation, and Avalanche of Worms features twelve all instrumental rock-metal tracks co-written by both guitarists. Both Levi and Werstler produced the album, which includes contributions from guest artists such as drummer Sean Reinert of Cynic. The album received positive to mixed reviews for its experimental and non-commercial nature. Ryan Ogle of Blabbermouth.net wrote that the two guitarists had composed and recorded a "dazzling display of fretboard pyrotechnics," while Metal Sucks called it "one of the best albums of 2010 thus far." Levi/Werstler afterwards toured with the band Cynic, also playing a number of other shows in between Dååth gigs.

The band Enders Game brought Werstler in as a guest soloist for a track on their album What We've Lost which came out in May 2010.

Dååth released their fourth studio album in October 2010 via Century Media Records. The eponymous Dååth was met with largely positive reviews, with Blistering writing that "Levi’s and Werstler’s guitar riffs drive the album’s force and display beautiful transitions and time signature changes." AllMusic wrote that the album was "another reminder that now it's the guitar-wielding duo of Eyal Levi and Emil Werstler (whose superlative lead work remains a must-hear proposition in its own right) running the Dååth show."

=== Studio work and joining Chimaira (2011–2012) ===
Werstler played guitar on a number of albums as a guest soloist in 2011, including II by Xerath, the Nine Inch Nails tribute Just Like You Imagined by From Exile, and The Age of Hell by Chimaira, which sold more than 7,000 copies in the United States in its first week of release to debut at position No. 54 on the Billboard 200 chart. After previously having played rhythm guitar for the band in 2009, Werstler periodically performed bass guitar for Chimaira in 2011 and by 2012 it had been confirmed that he would replace Rob Arnold as the band's lead guitarist.

Werstler continued to work as a studio musician and in 2012 he played lead guitar for the track "Shock and Awe" on the album A Lethal Dose of Truth by Sylencer.

On December 29, 2012, Chimaira released a teaser for their upcoming 2013 album.

=== Crown of Phantoms (2013) ===
The seventh and final studio album by Chimaira, Crown of Phantoms was released on July 30, 2013, via record label E1 Music. Werstler helped with co-writing the songs. On May 14, 2013, Chimaira released the album's first single, "All That's Left Is Blood", along with an accompanying music video and guitar solos by Werstler. A second single, "No Mercy", and music video was released on June 18, 2013. The album reached position 52 on the Billboard 200 charts on its first week of release, an improvement from the band's previous peak at No. 54. Crown of Phantoms made it into the "Top Fifteen Metal Albums of 2013" list compiled by Metal Sucks, ranking at No. 6. Reviewer Axl Rosenberg praised the new lineup, writing that "lead guitarist Emil Werstler and drummer Austin D’Amond give MVP performances; they sound ADD in the best possible way, taking riffs and fills which might be 'stock' in other hands and turning them into something just that much more creative and unique."

By September 2013 the band was supporting Crown of Phantoms with a tour of the United States.

=== Departure from Chimaira, studio work, and live shows (2014–2016) ===
Werstler announced his departure from Chimaira on September 1, 2014, and a day later, four other members announced their departure as well. On September 3 the band announced their formal break-up, describing it as amicable.

Werstler played a guest guitar solo on A Question of Perspective by Ron George in 2014.

In November 2014, Metal Sucks included Werstler as No. 2 on a short-list of "five guitarists we'd be happy to see join Megadeth," underneath only former Megadeth member Marty Friedman.

In early 2015 Nok Novum released a single, Shiryō featuring a guitar solo from Werstler.

According to an interview in May, Werstler was nearing completion on his debut solo album. He described the album as an opportunity to avoid "compromising" on the final rendition of tracks in any way, and also stated it wouldn't be described as "guitar music" only. Stated Werstler, "I don't look at myself as just a guitar player - I've always stressed the importance of having an identity and writing music."

Among other live appearances, in 2015 Werstler was a fill-in at a Brent Mason show, performing with Mason in Evansville, Indiana. In August, Works of Flesh released their album Plagued featuring a solo from Emil on the track "Paradise Lie". Emil made his final live appearance of 2015 opening for Deantoni Parks with electronic artist Chris Hunt on December 16. In 2016 Emil contributed guitar work on Tomb by Chris Hunt and noise for Silver Planet by Kacie Marie and Chris Hunt.

=== Col. Bruce Hampton, Verlorener, and Sunbelt Bliss (2017–2018) ===
In May 2017 while playing for Col. Bruce Hampton's 70th birthday concert at the Fox Theatre in Atlanta, Georgia, Hampton suffered a massive heart attack and collapsed on stage, dying shortly after.

In June 2017 Emil announced a crowdfunding campaign on Indiegogo for his upcoming solo project Verlorener. The project raised $14,883 in total. According to Emil, Verlorener "is a musical and visual identity created to facilitate my need to record and perform without compromise. This project is intended to be an ongoing effort to create a sound that is closer to what I intend to convey to the world." In February 2018 "Devil In The Room" premiered as an audio track. Verlorener was released on April 6, 2018, and a video was released shortly after. Emil also played on Ryan Knight's Sunbelt Bliss album that came out in 2018.

=== Tony MacAlpine, clinics, and studio work (2019–2021) ===
In 2019 Emil joined Tony MacAlpine's touring band for The Electric Illusionist Tour (2019/2020), Sons of Apollo MMXX World Tour (2020), and a tour with Verlorener as special guests which wrapped up in early 2020.

In April 2020 Werstler was featured on the Kingsmen album Revenge Forgiveness Recovery. Werstler was part of the Digital PRS Experience in May 2020 and launched a new artist website in December 2020.

In January 2021 Jason Bieler And The Baron Von Bielski Orchestra released their album Songs For The Apocalypse featuring Emil's talent on the track "Horror Wobbles The Hippo".

== Style and equipment ==
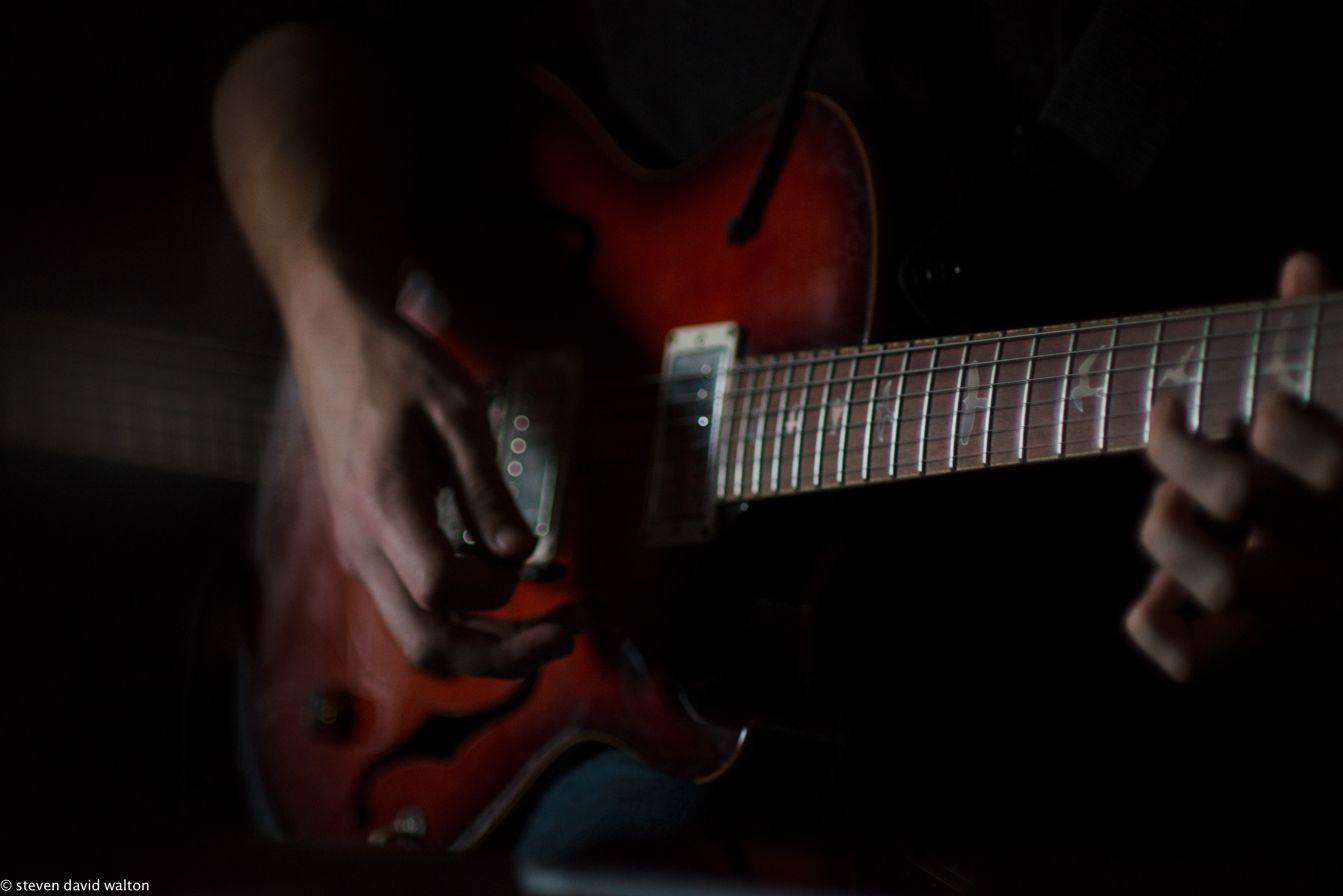
Emil Werstler photographed by Steven Walton in 2014.

As a six-string guitarist and bassist with a musical background in jazz and blues, Werstler incorporates diverse genres into his music, though he is perhaps best known for his work with metal and gypsy jazz. According to Werstler, he has been influenced by musicians and vocalists such as Martin Gore of Depeche Mode, David Eugene Edwards of Woven Hand, Anna Calvi, and Flying Lotus among others. In terms of jazz, he has also cited musicians such as George Benson, Charlie Parker, Charlie Christian, and Pat Martino as having an influence on his musical outlook.

External videos
- Video: "Interview with Emil Werstler" - Vol 247

As a guitarist, Werstler uses several models but is particularly known for playing a hollowbody. After playing a Spruce Hollowbody PRS on the first few Daath tours, Werstler was approached by the company in 2006 and began playing Paul Reed Smith Guitars exclusively. He often tours in the United States with seven different models on hand. According to Werstler, the guitars "are used for different tunings — one main and one backup per tuning: Drop C, Drop B, and Drop A. The seventh guitar is used as a bus guitar for warming up or teaching on the road." He described the PRS Archon as his primary instrument for "metal and loud rock," while he uses the PRS Private Stock JA-15 for more general purposes. In terms of guitar pedals, as of 2014 he primarily uses the Xotic Overdrive model, as well as the Electro Harmonix brand. Werstler continues to be active as a clinician and endorsee for Xotic Effects and PRS Guitars as of 2015. He is also an official advocate of the PRS Archon amp. He has been a part of a few ad campaigns and product launches, including the PRS Hollowbody with Mike Scott. Werstler has made a number of appearances at the annual Experience PRS event with a main stage performance and clinics with various musicians.

== Discography ==
=== Albums with Verlorener ===
- 2018: Verlorener

=== Albums with Dååth ===
- 2004: Futility
- 2007: The Hinderers
- 2009: The Concealers
- 2010: Dååth

=== Albums with Levi/Werstler ===
- 2010: Avalanche of Worms

=== Albums with Chimaira ===
- 2013: Crown of Phantoms

=== Other appearances ===
- 2006: United in Regret (Depeche Mode cover) by Arsis
- 2008: Total Brutal by Austrian Death Machine
- 2009: Guitars That Ate My Brain
- 2009: Monolith by From Exile
- 2010: What We’ve Lost by Enders Game
- 2011: II by Xerath
- 2011: The Age of Hell by Chimaira
- 2011: Just Like You Imagined (NIN tribute) by From Exile
- 2012: A Lethal Dose of Truth by Sylencer
- 2014: A Question of Perspective by Ron George
- 2014: Shiryo by Nok Novum
- 2015: Plagued by Works of Flesh
- 2016: Tomb by Chris Hunt
- 2016: Silver Planet by Kacie Marie and Chris Hunt
- 2018: Sunbelt Bliss by Ryan Knight
- 2018: Tormenter by The Agony Scene
- 2020: Revenge Forgiveness Recovery by Kingsmen
- 2021: Songs For The Apocalypse by Jason Bieler
- 2024: WAXpaper by WAXpaper, Kevin Scott

== Videography ==
- 2007: "Subterfuge" by Dååth
- 2007: "Festival Mass Soulform" by Dååth
- 2009: "Day of Endless Light" by Dååth
- 2013: "All That's Left Is Blood" by Chimaira
- 2013: "No Mercy" by Chimaira
- 2013: "Wrapped In Violence" by Chimaira
- 2013: "Crown of Phantoms" by Chimaira
- 2018: "Devil In The Room" by Verlorener

== See also ==
- List of lead guitarists
- List of rhythm guitarists
