= A Diamond for Disease =

EP by Arsis
- Released: October 25, 2005
- Recorded: Hairy Breakfast Productions; Max Trax Studios
- Genre: Melodic death metal Technical death metal
- Length: 19:59
- Label: Willowtip
- Producer: Eyal Levi, Brett Portzer

Arsis chronology
A Celebration of Guilt (2004)	A Diamond for Disease (2005)	United in Regret (2006)

Professional ratings
Review scores
Source	Rating
Exclaim!	favorable
Stylus Magazine	(B+)

A Diamond for Disease is an EP by American heavy metal band Arsis released on October 25, 2005, via Willowtip Records. The title track, "A Diamond for Disease", took almost four months to write. This release also includes an Alice Cooper cover from the Raise Your Fist and Yell album, and "The Promise of Never" (which is a re-recorded track from the band's 2001 demo, originally titled Fortune's Envy). The EP was mastered by James Murphy, who is best known for his work with Death, Testament, Obituary, and Disincarnate.

== Track listing ==
No.	Title	Writer(s)	Length
1.	"A Diamond for Disease"	James Malone	12:52
2.	"Roses on White Lace" (Alice Cooper cover)	Alice Cooper, Kane Roberts	4:17
3.	"The Promise of Never"	James Malone	2:50

== Personnel ==
- James Malone – vocals, guitars, bass
- Mike Van Dyne – drums

== Production ==
- Brett Portzer - engineering (drums)
- Eyal Levi - engineering, mixing
- James Murphy - mastering
- Mark Riddick - artwork, layout
