= Visitant =

Studio album by Arsis
- Released: November 2, 2018
- Recorded: October 2017 – 2018
- Studio: Various: MRL Studios (Nashville, Tennessee, U.S.); The Shred Light District (Wyckoff, New Jersey, U.S.); Vocal Yocal Production (Las Colinas, Texas, U.S.); Double Dragon Sound (Seattle, Washington, U.S.); Priestgrinder Studios (Portland, Oregon, U.S.)
- Length: 48:16
- Label: Nuclear Blast; Agonia
- Producer: Mark Lewis

Arsis chronology
Unwelcome (2013)	Visitant (2018)

Singles from Visitant
- 1. "Tricking the Gods" Released: September 6, 2018; 2. "Hell Sworn" Released: October 5, 2018

Visitant is the sixth studio album by American extreme metal band Arsis, released on November 2, 2018, via Nuclear Blast (in Americas) and Agonia (in Europe and the rest of the world). It was the last to feature lead guitarist Brandon Ellis before his resignation to focus for his own music career.

== Track listing ==
All tracks are written by Arsis, except "His Eyes" written by Pseudo Echo.

No.	Title	Length
1.	"Tricking the Gods"	5:32
2.	"Hell Sworn"	4:12
3.	"Easy Prey"	4:27
4.	"Fathoms"	3:50
5.	"As Deep as Your Flesh"	4:26
6.	"A Pulse Keeping Time with the Dark"	4:10
7.	"Funereal Might"	3:58
8.	"Death Vow"	4:23
9.	"Dead Is Better"	3:27
10.	"Unto the Knife"	5:30
11.	"His Eyes" (Pseudo Echo cover)	4:21
Total length:		48:16

== Personnel ==
Arsis

- James Malone – lead vocals, rhythm guitar
- Brandon Ellis – lead guitar, backing vocals
- Noah Martin – bass, backing vocals
- Shawn Priest – drums, backing vocals

Additional musician

- Malcolm Pugh (Inferi) – guitar solo (track 2)
- Trevor Strnad (The Black Dahlia Murder) – guest vocals (track 11)
- Ben Bennett – backing vocals
- Torin Ridgway – backing vocals

Production

- Mark Lewis – production, recording, mixing, mastering
- James Malone – recording (vocals, synths)
- Brandon Ellis – recording (guitars)
- Noah Martin – recording (bass)
- Mark Riddick – artwork, layout
