= Ovum (disambiguation) =

Ovum most commonly refers to:

- Ovum, oosphere or egg cell, the female gamete involved in oogamous sexual reproduction

Ovum may also refer to:

In music:

- Ovum Recordings, a music record label in Philadelphia, founded 1994
- A song on the second studio album, The Hinderers, released 2007 by the American band Dååth

In industry:

- Ovum Ltd., an industry analyst firm headquartered in London, England
