= Unwelcome (album) =

2013 album by Arsis

Studio album by Arsis
- Released: April 30, 2013
- Recorded: Audiohammer Studios
- Genre: Melodic death metal, technical death metal
- Length: 36:37
- Label: Nuclear Blast
- Producer: Mark Lewis

Arsis chronology
Lepers Caress (2012)	Unwelcome (2013)	Visitant (2018)

Professional ratings
Review scores
Source	Rating
Metal Blast	2.5/5 stars
Metal Underground	3.5/5 stars

Unwelcome is the fifth studio album by the American death metal band Arsis. It was released on April 30, 2013 through Nuclear Blast Records. This is the first full-length album to feature Shawn Priest on drums and Brandon Ellis on guitar. The second track is re-recorded version from their 2012 EP, Lepers Caress. This album was produced by Mark Lewis.

== Reception ==
Unwelcome was generally well received by both critics and fans, being hailed as a return-to-form to their earlier materials compared to their 2010 release Starve for the Devil by focusing on aggression and technicality, but still remaining melodic and listenable. Criticism of the album usually focuses on general inaccessibility to those who are not fans of technical death metal, or the inclusion less-serious sounding parts of the album, for example the inclusion of the 80s hit "Sunglasses at Night" by Corey Hart. Andrew Uscategui of Sputnik Music writes: "Also as you'd expect from Arsis, there's a decent amount of cheese on Unwelcome, if you didn't already get that notion from the ridiculous song titles. 'Sunglasses at Night' isn't necessarily their fault as it's a Corey Hart cover (which is odd enough as it is), but the lyrics are so blatantly awful it's almost impossible to ignore." Despite this, he did give the album 3.5 out of 5 stars, saying that "Arsis deserves some credit for staying true to their technical melodeath roots after all this time. Even after compromising their sound in the past, Unwelcome shows the band doing what they do best and doesn't completely rule out the idea of another A Celebration of Guilt or A Diamond for Disease sometime in the future."

== Track listing ==
No.	Title	Length
1.	"Unwelcome"	3:41
2.	"Carve My Cross (Re-recorded)"	4:14
3.	"Handbook for the Recently Deceased"	3:48
4.	"Choking on Sand"	3:18
5.	"Let Me Be the One"	3:10
6.	"Sunglasses at Night" (Corey Hart cover)	3:58
7.	"Martyred or Mourning"	4:09
8.	"No One Lies to the Dead"	3:05
9.	"I Share in Shame"	3:36
10.	"Scornstar"	3:38
11.	"The Face of My Innocence (Re-recorded) (Bonus Track)"	5:41

== Credits ==
=== Personnel ===
- James Malone – vocals, rhythm guitar
- Brandon Ellis – lead guitar
- Noah Martin – bass
- Shawn Priest – drums

=== Additional Personnel ===
- Ryan Knight – guitar solo (track 7)
- Nick Cordle – guitar solo (track 9)

=== Production ===
- Mark Lewis – engineering, mixing
- Mark Riddick – artwork, layout
