= Love it or leave it =

Love it or leave it may refer to:

== Politics ==
- "Brazil, love it or leave it" (Brasil, ame-o ou deixe-o), nationalist slogan of the Brazilian military dictatorship
- "America, love it or leave it", a slogan that became common during Vietnam War protests
- "Ya sev ya terket", A Turkish nationalist slogan

== Film and television ==
- Love It or Leave It, an episode of the American TV series The Sympathizer
- "Love it or Leave it, Change it or Lose it", an episode of the American drama series Bracken's World
- Kochaj albo rzuć (Love It or Leave It), a Polish 1977 movie by Sylwester Chęciński
- Italy: Love it, or Leave it, an Italian 2011 documentary and docudrama by Gustav Hofer and Luca Ragazzi

== Music ==
=== Songs ===
- "Love It or Leave It Alone", a song by Etta James on the album Love's Been Rough on Me
- "Love It or Leave It", a song by K.Maro on the album Perfect Stranger
- "Love It or Leave It Alone/Welcome to Jamrock", a song by Alicia Keys on the album Unplugged
- "Love It or Leave It", a song by Robby Krieger on the album No Habla
- "Love It or Leave It Alone", a song by Michie Mee on the album The First Cut Is the Deepest
- "Love It or Leave It", a song by Misery Index on the album Hang Em High
- "Love It or Leave It", a song by Heidi Montag on the album Superficial
- "Love It or Leave It", a song Asaf Avidan on the album Different Pulses

== Other uses ==
- "Love It or Leave It", short story by Charles Bukowski on the book Tales of Ordinary Madness
- "Love it or leave it", an irreversible binomial idiomatic expression

== See also ==
- "Bicentennial Blues (Love It or Leave It)", a song by Ray Manzarek on the album The Whole Thing Started with Rock & Roll Now It's Out of Control
- "It's America (Love It or Leave It)", a song by Ernest Tubb on the album Good Year for the Wine
- Lovett or Leave It, political podcast hosted by Jon Lovett
