= Hang them all =

Hang Them All may refer to:

- "Hang Them All", song by Tom T. Hall from the album I Witness Life
- "Hang Them All", song by Jay Reatard from the album Watch Me Fall
- "Hang Them All", song by Tapes 'n Tapes from the album Walk It Off

== See also ==
- "Hang'Em All", song by Carpenter Brut from the album EP II
- Hang Em High (disambiguation)
