= David Merrill =

David Merrill may refer to:

- David Nathan Merrill (born 1943), American diplomat
- M. David Merrill (born 1937), education researcher
- David Merrill, guitarist and co-founder of Enders Game
