= Enders Game (band) =

US musical group

- Origin: Atlanta, Georgia, United States
- Genres: Thrash metal, speed metal, death metal, power metal, metalcore
- Members: Shon Harp; David Merrill; Jarrod Johnson
- Past members: Kevin Freeman; Ben Burch; Jeff Gardner; Daniel Burch
- Website: http://endersgametheband.com

Enders Game is an American heavy metal band from Atlanta, Georgia.

== History ==
Enders Game was formed in 2001 by guitarists David Merrill and Jarrod Johnson. The original lineup included Kevin Freeman on vocals, Jeff Gardner on drums, and Ben Burch on bass. After just two shows with the band, and shortly before entering the studio to record the band's first EP, Game Over (2003), Burch left the band and was replaced by Shon Harp.

Game Over features 3 songs initially written by Merrill for his former band, Art of Submission. But the fourth and final track on the EP, "S.K.D. (Systematic Killing of the American Dream)," was the first collaboration between Merrill and Johnson, and remains one of the most popular songs in the band's set to this day. The song "Shedding Faith" made the top 20 on Rapture Radio's weekly request chart.

The band attempted a full-length release in 2005 titled Pattern of Decay, but Gardner and Freeman both left the band (Freeman left to join Gnostic with former members of Atheist, including drummer Steve Flynn), and the album, although recorded, was never released. Gardner was replaced on drums by Daniel Burch, brother of former bassist Ben Burch, and current bassist Shon Harp took over vocals after Freeman's departure.

With the new lineup, the band recorded and released an EP titled Breathe New Life in 2006. Breathe features 6 tracks, including standouts "Splintered and Broken," and "Autumn Leaves." Shortly after returning home from a brief Midwest tour in 2007, Burch announced he was leaving the band.

Following Burch's departure, the band began working on their next album. Kevin Talley, who at the time was drumming for fellow Atlanta-based metal act Dååth, was hired to record the songs, and in 2010 Enders Game released their first full-length album, What We’ve Lost. The album was recorded and engineered by Eyal Levi of Dååth, and also features guest guitar solos by Levi on the song "Holding On," and fellow Dååth guitarist Emil Werstler on the song "A Flawed Design". Artwork for the album was created by artist Eliran Kantor.

Enders Game has performed with many well-known metal and hard rock acts, such as In Flames, Soilwork, Chimaira, Dååth, Unearth, Arsis, Angels of Babylon, Silent Civilian, Taproot and Straight Line Stitch, and they continue to perform, write and record.

== Members ==
Current members

- Shon Harp – vocals, bass guitar (2003–present)
- Jarrod Johnson – guitar (2001–present)
- David Merrill – guitar (2001–present)

Touring members

- Chad Blackwell – drums (2012–present)
- Mark Fichman – drums (2009–2011)
- Jeremy Harrison – bass guitar (2007–2009, 2012–present)
- George Thomas – bass guitar (2010–2011)

Former members

- Ben Burch – bass guitar (2001–2002)
- Daniel Burch – drums (2005–2007)
- Kevin Freeman – vocals (2001–2005)
- Jeff Gardner – drums (2002–2005)

== Discography ==
- Game Over (2003) – EP
- Pattern of Decay (2005) – LP, unreleased
- Breathe New Life (2006) – EP
- What We’ve Lost (2010) – LP
