= Dååth (album) =

Studio album by Dååth
- Released: October 26, 2010
- Genre: Progressive death metal, technical death metal, groove metal
- Length: 45:13
- Label: Century Media
- Producer: Eyal Levi, Mark Lewis

Dååth chronology
The Concealers (2009)	Dååth (2010)	The Deceivers (2024)

Dååth is the fourth studio album by American death metal band Dååth, released on October 26, 2010 through Century Media Records.

== Track listing ==
All tracks are written by Eyal Levi, Jeremy Creamer & Eric Guenther.

No.	Title	Length
1.	"Genocidal Maniac"	3:58
2.	"Destruction/Restoration"	2:34
3.	"Indestructible Overdose"	2:38
4.	"Double Tap Suicide"	4:40
5.	"The Decider"	3:45
6.	"Exit Plan"	3:19
7.	"Oxygen Burn"	4:05
8.	"Accelerant"	3:34
9.	"Arch {Enemy} Misanthrope"	5:05
10.	"Manufactured Insomnia"	2:49
11.	"A Cold Devotion"	2:47
12.	"N.A.T.G.O.D."	3:22
13.	"Terminal Now"	2:29

Professional ratings
Review scores
Source	Rating
About.com	4/5 stars
Metal Hammer	(4/7)
Blistering	7.5/10 stars
Rock Sound	(8/10)
Allmusic	3/5 stars

== Personnel ==
Dååth

- Sean Zatorsky – vocals
- Eyal Levi – guitar, producer, engineer
- Jeremy Creamer – bass guitar
- Emil Werstler – guitar
- Kevin Talley – drums, drum engineering

Additional

- Eric Guenther – keyboards
- Caleb Bingham- engineer
- Mark Lewis – engineer, mixing, producer
- Jason Suecof – vocal producer
- Maor Appelbaum – mastering engineer
