= Spree =

Spree may refer to:

== Film and television ==
- The Spree, a 1998 American television film directed by Tommy Lee Wallace
- Spree (film), a 2020 American film starring Joe Keery
- "Spree" (Numbers), an episode of the television show Numbers
- "Spree!", an episode of Hi Hi Puffy AmiYumi
- Spree TV, a former shopping television channel in Australia
- The Spree, a terrorist group of witches in Motherland: Fort Salem

== Other uses ==
- Spree (river), river in Germany
- Honda Spree, a motor scooter
- Killing spree
- Latrell Sprewell (born 1970), nicknamed "Spree", American basketball player
- Spraoi (pronounced 'spree'), annual festival in Waterford, Ireland
- Spree (candy), a type of candy
- Spree Commerce, an open-source e-commerce platform
- SpringSpree, the annual cultural festival of the National Institute of Technology, Warangal, India
- UNSW School of Photovoltaic and Renewable Energy Engineering (SPREE), at the University of New South Wales, Australia

== See also ==
- Spree shopping
- Shopping spree (disambiguation)
