= Nothnegal =

Maldivian heavy metal band

Background information
- Origin: Malé, Maldives
- Genres: Melodic death metal, thrash metal, progressive metal
- Years active: 2006–2021
- Labels: Season of Mist
- Members: Affan; Fufu; Hilarl; Battery; Marco Sneck; Kevin Talley
- Past members: Avo; Shanoon; Marn; Wadde; Khumainy
- Website: nothnegal.net

Nothnegal was a Maldivian heavy metal band from Malé, formed in 2006 by guitarists Hilarl and Fufu. Throughout the band's career, they have released one full-length album, and two EPs, and toured in more than 30 countries around the world. Nothnegal's sound have evolved through a succession of styles, from industrial metal to alternative rock.

== History ==
Nothnegal was formed by guitarists Hilarl and Fufu in 2006.

The band have explored themes of global warming centred around artificial intelligence. Their debut album Decadence tells a story that takes place in a future world that is consumed by water, which is controlled by artificial intelligence. The story is presented in the lyrics in a screenplay format between the individual songs. The story parts link the lyrics of the songs together thematically.

Nothnegal have been honored with a National Youth Award in the band's home country. The Maldives President Mohamed Waheed Hassan presented the National Youth Award 2012 to Nothnegal in the category of Performing Arts.

== Members ==
=== Current ===
- Affan – lead vocals (2011–present)
- Fufu – lead vocals/lead guitar (2006–present)
- Hilarl – lead guitar (2006–present)
- Battery – bass (2007–present)
- Marco Sneck – keyboards (2009–present)
- Kevin Talley – drums, percussion (2009–present)

=== Live ===
- Shahaaim – bass (2006–present)

=== Former ===
- Avo – lead vocals (2008–2011)
- Shanoon – keyboards (2006–2009)
- Marn – drums, percussion (2006–2009)
- Wadde – lead vocals (2006–2007)
- Khumainy – bass (2006–2007)

== Discography ==
- Antidote of Realism (EP, 2009)
- Decadence (LP, 2012)
- Nothnegal (EP, 2013)

== Awards ==
Year	Nominated work	Award	Result	Ref
2012	Themselves	Maldives National Youth Award	Won	
2012	"Decadence"	Best Metal Newcomer	Won	
