= United in Regret =

Studio album by Arsis
- Released: November 7, 2006
- Recorded: Hairy Breakfast Productions; Max Trax Studios
- Genre: Melodic death metal, technical death metal
- Length: 35:08
- Label: Willowtip, Candlelight
- Producer: Eyal Levi; Brett Portzer

Arsis chronology
A Diamond for Disease (2005)	United in Regret (2006)	We Are the Nightmare (2008)

Professional ratings
Review scores
Source	Rating
Lambgoat	8/10 stars
AllMusic	4/5 stars

United in Regret is the second studio album released by American death metal band Arsis. This album has Noah Martin on session bass as opposed to James Malone, and features a guest guitar solo by Emil Werstler of Chimaira and Dååth on "The Things You Said." United in Regret received favorable reviews from press worldwide, including The Village Voice, Pop Matters, Metal Review, and Metal Maniacs magazine.

== Track listing ==
All songs written by James Malone, except where noted.

1. "Oh, the Humanity" - 4:25
2. "...And the Blind One Came" - 5:03
3. "United in Regret" - 3:47
4. "I Speak Through Shadows" - 4:06
5. "Lust Before the Maggots Conquest" - 4:47
6. "The Marriage Bed" - 3:15
7. "The Cold Resistance" - 3:48
8. "The Things You Said" (Depeche Mode cover) - 3:23
9. "Hopeless Truth" - 3:54

== Credits ==
=== Personnel ===
- James Malone - guitars, vocals
- Mike Van Dyne - drums
- Noah Martin - bass

=== Additional personnel ===
- Emil Werstler - guitar solo (track 8)

=== Production ===
- Brett Portzer - drum engineering
- Eyal Levi - engineering, mixing
- Scott Hull - mastering
- Mark Riddick - artwork, layout
