= Retaliate (Misery Index album) =

Studio album by Misery Index
- Released: August 26, 2003
- Recorded: March 29, 2003 – April 18, 2003 at Wild Studio in St-Zenon, Quebec, Canada
- Genres: Death metal, grindcore
- Length: 35:09
- Label: Nuclear Blast
- Producer: Jean-François Dagenais

Misery Index chronology
Retaliate (2003)	Discordia (2006)

Professional ratings
Review scores
Source	Rating
Metal Storm	8.4/10

Retaliate is the debut album of American death metal band Misery Index.

"Demand the Impossible" was previously recorded and released on the split with Structure of Lies.

== Track listing ==
No.	Title	Length
1.	"Retaliate"	3:28
2.	"The Lies That Bind"	2:46
3.	"The Great Depression"	2:40
4.	"Angst Isst Die Seele Auf"	4:16
5.	"Demand the Impossible"	4:29
6.	"Order Upheld/Dissent Dissolved"	2:21
7.	"Servants of Progress"	2:15
8.	"The Unbridgeable Chasm"	3:28
9.	"Bottom Feeders"	2:06
10.	"History Is Rotten"	3:31
11.	"Birth of Ignorance" (bonus track, Brutal Truth cover)	3:49
Total length:		35:09

== Personnel ==
- Jason Netherton – vocals, bass
- John "Sparky" Voyles – guitars
- Matt Byers – drums
- Maurizio Iacono – vocals ("Demand the Impossible")

=== Production ===
- Pierre Rémillard – engineering
- Jean-François Dagenais – production, engineering, mixing
- Bernard Belley – mastering
- Mike Harrison – layout
- Tim Finn – photography
