= I (Xerath album) =

Studio album by Xerath
- Released: 25 May 2009
- Recorded: 2008
- Studio: Tower Studios, England, United Kingdom
- Genre: Progressive metal, symphonic metal, groove metal
- Length: 39:30
- Label: Candlelight Records

Xerath chronology
I (2009)	II (2011)

I is the debut studio album by English metal band Xerath. It was released on 25 May 2009 through Candlelight Records. It was mixed and mastered by Brett-Caldas Lima at Tower Studios. The iconic artwork was by Colin Marks of Rainsong Design.

The video for "False History" received heavy rotation in the UK on rock music channel Scuzz.

== Critical response ==
- Kerrang! - "Sure to blow all the competition out of the water"
- Terrorizer - "Possibly one of the most exciting things to come out of the British metal scene for some time"
- Powerplay - "Head nodding grooves and filmic drama"
- Metal Hammer UK "Xerath sound like the result of a chaotic experiment to produce the ultimate please-them-all 21st century metal band.

Professional ratings
Review scores
Source	Rating
Kerrang!	KKKK
Terrorizer	(8/10 )
Powerplay	(8/10)
Metal Hammer UK	(8/10)

== Track listing ==
No.	Title	Length
1.	"Intrenity"	3:32
2.	"Alterra"	2:49
3.	"Nocturnum"	3:47
4.	"Consequences"	4:28
5.	"Interlude"	1:41
6.	"False History"	3:48
7.	"Abiogenesis"	5:54
8.	"Reform": I. "Part I" (3:22); II. "Part II" (4:35)"	7:57
9.	"Right to Exist"	5:41
