= Traitors (album) =

Studio album by Misery Index
- Released: September 30, 2008
- Recorded: May 2008
- Studio: Godcity Studio (Salem, Massachusetts)
- Genre: Death metal, grindcore
- Length: 37:30
- Label: Relapse
- Producer: Kurt Ballou

Misery Index chronology
Discordia (2006)	Traitors (2008)	Heirs to Thievery (2010)

Traitors is the third studio album by American death metal band Misery Index. It was recorded by Kurt Ballou, mixed/mastered by Steve Wright and released through Relapse Records on September 30, 2008. A video was released for the song "Traitors".

== Critical reception ==
Professional ratings
Review scores
Source	Rating
Allmusic	3.5/5 stars
Blabbermouth.net	8.5/10 stars
Pitchfork Media	7.5/10 stars
Terrorizer	8/10 stars

Scott Alisoglu, reviewing the album for Blabbermouth.net, considered the songs on the album more varied and the songwriting better than on the preceding Discordia album, and also noted an increased sense of melody. Pitchfork Media's Cosmo Lee stated that Ballou had achieved "a sound falling somewhere between 'battering ram' and 'machine gun'", calling the album a "thought-provoking package", with lyrical themes varying from criticism of the US government to celebrity worship. According to Allmusic writer Greg Prato, the band "keep things as precise, tight, and brutal as possible from start to finish", and called the album "a complete sonic assault". The album was named "Album of the Month" by Terrorizer magazine in November 2008.

== Track listing ==
No.	Title	Lyrics	Music	Length
1.	"We Never Come in Peace"	Netherton	Netherton, Jarvis	1:59
2.	"Theocracy"	Netherton	Voyles, Jarvis	4:30
3.	"Partisans of Grief"	Netherton	Klöppel, Jarvis	3:36
4.	"Traitors"	Netherton	Klöppel, Jarvis	2:23
5.	"Ghosts of Catalonia"	Netherton	Klöppel, Jarvis	5:00
6.	"Occupation"	Netherton	Netherton, Jarvis	4:43
7.	"Ruling Class Cancelled"	Netherton	Klöppel, Jarvis	2:07
8.	"The Arbiter"	Klöppel	Klöppel, Jarvis	2:02
9.	"American Idolatry"	Netherton	Netherton, Jarvis	2:19
10.	"Thrown into the Sun"	Klöppel	Klöppel, Jarvis	3:58
11.	"Black Sites"	Netherton	Voyles, Jarvis	4:44
Total length:				37:30

== Personnel ==
- Adam Jarvis – drums
- Mark Klöppel – guitar, vocals
- Jason Netherton – bass guitar, vocals
- Sparky Voyles – guitar
- Guy Kozowyk – vocals ("Partisans of Grief")
- Tomas Lindberg – vocals ("Ruling Class Cancelled")

=== Production ===
- Kurt Ballou – engineering, recording
- Drew Lamond – mixing, mastering
- Steve Wright – mixing, mastering
