= Dissent (EP) =

EP by Misery Index
- Recorded: June 2004 at Hairy Breakfast Studios (Atlanta, Georgia)
- Genre: Deathgrind
- Label: Anarchos

Dissent is an EP by American deathgrind band Misery Index.

== Track listing ==
All music and lyrics written by Misery Index, unless noted otherwise.

1. "Sheep and Wolves"
2. "Exception to the Ruled"
3. "The Imperial Ambition"
4. "Multiply by Fire"
5. "Defector"
6. "Screaming at a Wall" (Minor Threat cover) (Vinyl-only bonus track)

== Personnel ==
=== Production ===
- Eyal Levi – recording
