= III (Xerath album) =

Studio album by Xerath
- Released: September 16, 2014
- Genres: Groove metal, progressive metal, death metal, symphonic metal
- Length: 66:05
- Label: Candlelight Records

Xerath chronology
II (2011)	III (2014)

Professional ratings
Review scores
Source	Rating
Brave Words	7/10
The Circle Pit	9/10
Louder Sound	8/10
Metal Temple	9/10
Ultimate Guitar	7.7/10

III is the third album by English metal band Xerath, released on September 16, 2014 through Candlelight Records.

== Track listing ==
No.	Title	Length
1.	"I Hold Dominion"	7:10
2.	"2053"	4:51
3.	"I Hunt For The Weak"	4:03
4.	"Autonomous"	4:45
5.	"Bleed This Body Clean"	4:24
6.	"Death Defiant"	4:44
7.	"Sentinels"	4:20
8.	"Passenger"	4:44
9.	"Ironclad"	5:17
10.	"Demigod Doctrine"	4:36
11.	"The Chaos Reign"	3:59
12.	"Witness"	5:40
13.	"Veil": I. "Part I" (4:55); II. "Part II" (4:50)"	9:45
Total length:		66:05
