= Hang Em High (disambiguation) =

Hang 'Em High is a 1968 film starring Clint Eastwood.

Hang 'Em High may also refer to:

- "Hang 'Em High" (composition) (1968), the title theme from the film
- Hang Em High (EP), an EP by Misery Index
- "Hang 'Em High" (song), by Sadat X featuring D.V. Alias Khrist
- "Hang 'Em High" (1982), a song by Van Halen on the album Diver Down
- "Hang 'Em High" (2004), a song by My Chemical Romance on the album Three Cheers for Sweet Revenge
- "Hang 'Em High" (2006), a song by A Static Lullaby on the album A Static Lullaby
- "Hang 'Em High" (2011), a song by The Dropkick Murphys on the album Going Out in Style
- "Hang 'Em High" (2012), a song by Mondo Generator on the album Hell Comes to Your Heart
- "Hang 'Em High" (2017), a song by Havok on the album Conformicide
- Hang 'Em High, a defunct punk rock band formed after the breakup of The F-Ups
