= The Killing Gods =

Studio album by Misery Index
- Released: May 27, 2014
- Recorded: November 2013; December 2013 – January 2014
- Studios: Visceral Sound Studios (Bethesda, Maryland); Wrightway Studios (Baltimore, Maryland)
- Genres: Death metal, grindcore
- Length: 43:38
- Label: Season of Mist

Misery Index chronology
| Heirs to Thievery (2010) | The Killing Gods (2014) | Rituals of Power (2019) |

The Killing Gods is the fifth studio album by American death metal band Misery Index. It was released on May 27, 2014, by Season of Mist. The first five tracks of the album are all part of one collective song called "Faust".

== Reception ==
Professional ratings
Review scores
| Source | Rating |
|---|---|
| Exclaim! | 9/10 |
| Revolver | 3.5/5 |

Adrien Begrand wrote for Decibel that Misery Index's "hybrid of death metal and grindcore hasn't lost a step at all". He praised the album's "taut and aggressive" music, along with its "clever use of melody" and Jason Netherton's "commanding vocals". Bradley Zorgdrager of Exclaim! said that Misery Index have "focused their craft", and found that the band "proudly embraces" melody on this album. He described the album as "unrelentingly fast, unabashedly heavy and unequivocally the best album yet from an already great band." Sammi Chichester of Revolver described how, during the opening suite of songs, Misery Index "split their blast beats with emotionally-driven breakdowns and melodic guitar solos". She also said the album "might initially irk diehards, but should ultimately leave them far from miserable".

== Track listing ==
All music is composed by Misery Index.

| No. | Title | Lyrics | Length |
|---|---|---|---|
| 1. | "Urfaust" (Instrumental) | Mark Kloeppel | 1:07 |
| 2. | "The Calling" | Kloeppel | 3:39 |
| 3. | "The Oath" (Instrumental) | Kloeppel | 1:20 |
| 4. | "Conjuring the Cull" | Kloeppel | 4:45 |
| 5. | "The Harrowing" | Kloeppel | 4:28 |
| 6. | "The Killing Gods" | Jason Netherton | 5:30 |
| 7. | "Cross to Bear" | Kloeppel | 4:25 |
| 8. | "Gallows Humor" | Netherton | 4:44 |
| 9. | "The Weakener" | Netherton | 3:55 |
| 10. | "Sentinels" | Netherton | 2:37 |
| 11. | "Colony Collapse" | Netherton | 3:33 |
| 12. | "Heretics" | Netherton | 3:33 |
| Total length: | | | 43:38 |

== Personnel ==
=== Misery Index ===
- Jason Netherton – bass guitar, lead and backing vocals
- Mark Kloeppel – guitar, lead vocals
- Adam Jarvis – drums
- Darin Morris – lead guitar

=== Additional musicians ===
- John Gallagher – guitar solo on "Colony Collapse"

=== Production ===
- Steve Wright – engineering
- Scott Hull – recording
- Darin Morris – recording assistance
- Drew Lamond – production assistance
- Tony Eichler – mastering
- Gary Ronaldson – artwork, design, layout
- Josh Sisk – photography
