= Shopping Spree (disambiguation) =

Shopping Spree is a 1996–1998 TV game show.

A shopping spree is a period of intensive shopping.

Shopping Spree may also refer to:

- "Shopping Spree" (The Price Is Right), pricing game featured on unrelated TV game show
- "Shopping Spree" (Chowder episode), 2009 episode of the TV series

== See also ==
- Spree (disambiguation)
