= Rituals of Power =

Studio album by Misery Index
- Released: March 8, 2019
- Genre: Death metal, crust punk
- Length: 36:02
- Label: Season of Mist

Misery Index chronology
The Killing Gods (2014)	Rituals of Power (2019)

Professional ratings
Review scores
Source	Rating
Exclaim!	8/10
MetalSucks	4/5 stars

Rituals of Power is the sixth studio album by American death metal band Misery Index. It was released on March 8, 2019, by Season of Mist.

== Track listing ==
No.	Title	Lyrics	Music	Length
1.	"Universal Untruths"	Netherton	Jarvis, Morris, Kloeppel	2:35
2.	"Decline and Fall"	Netherton	Jarvis, Morris, Kloeppel	4:36
3.	"The Choir Invisible"	Netherton	Jarvis, Kloeppel	4:26
4.	"New Salem"	Kloeppel	Jarvis, Kloeppel	3:24
5.	"Hammering the Nails"	Netherton	Jarvis, Netherton	3:46
6.	"Rituals of Power"	Netherton	Jarvis, Kloeppel	5:20
7.	"They Always Come Back"	Netherton	Jarvis, Netherton	5:08
8.	"I Disavow"	Netherton	Jarvis, Kloeppel	4:21
9.	"Naysayer"	Netherton, Kloeppel	Jarvis, Kloeppel	2:26
Total length:				36:02

== Personnel ==
=== Misery Index ===
- Jason Netherton – bass guitar, lead and backing vocals
- Mark Kloeppel – guitar, lead vocals
- Adam Jarvis – drums
- Darin Morris – lead guitar

=== Production ===
- Ryan Vincent M – recording (at Apollo Audio Alternative)
- Erik Rutan – recording (at Mana Recording)
- Valtteri Kallio – recording (at Soundwell Studio)
- Will Putney – mixing, mastering

== Charts ==
Chart (2019)	Peak position
German Albums (Offizielle Top 100)	89
