= Lepers Caress =

EP by Arsis
- Released: December 4, 2012
- Recorded: 2012 at Cue Studios
- Length: 19:11
- Label: Scion Audio/Visual
- Producer: Kevin Cortes

Arsis chronology
Starve for the Devil (2010)	Lepers Caress (2012)	Unwelcome (2013)

Lepers Caress is the second EP by American metal band Arsis. It was released on December 4, 2012 as a digital release through Scion Audio/Visual. This is the first album to feature Shawn Priest on drums and Brandon Ellis on guitars who joined earlier that year. They replacing Mike Van Dyne and Nick Cordle after their departure.

== Track listing ==
No.	Title	Length
1.	"Haunted, Fragile and Frozen"	1:53
2.	"Six Coffins Wide"	4:12
3.	"Veil of Mourning Black (Re-recorded)"	3:01
4.	"A Tearful Haunt, Condemned"	3:32
5.	"Carve My Cross"	4:06
6.	"Denied"	2:27

== Credits ==
=== Personnel ===
- James Malone - lead vocals, rhythm guitar
- Brandon Ellis - lead guitar, backing vocals
- Noah Martin - bass, backing vocals
- Shawn Priest - drums, backing vocals

=== Production ===
- Chris "Zeuss" Harris - mixing, mastering
- French - Artwork, Design

== Notes ==
- "Veil of Mourning Black" is a re-recorded from their two previous demos.
- "Denied" is a reworked version from their previous demo, "Painted Eyes".
- "Carve My Cross" was later re-recorded for their fifth studio album, Unwelcome.
