= Alarum (band) =

Australian progressive metal band

- Origin: Melbourne, Victoria, Australia
- Genres: Progressive metal, technical death metal, jazz fusion
- Years active: 1992–present
- Labels: Prey, Willowtip, Earache
- Members: Mark Palfreyman; Scott Young; John Sanders
- Past members: Ryan Williams; Mark Evans; Matthew Racovalis; Luke Morris; Lester Perry; Chris Broome; Rob Brens
- Website: alarum.com

Alarum is also the Shakespearian spelling for alarm.

Alarum is an Australian progressive metal band which formed in 1992. Their first album, Fluid Motion, was self-released in 1998. The second album, Eventuality..., was released in Australia and United States on Willowtip Records in October 2004 and in Europe on Earache Records in June 2005. From April to June 2006 Alarum toured US with Necrophagist, Arsis, Cattle Decapitation and Neuraxis. They followed with shows in the United Kingdom and Ireland with Obituary. The group's third album, Natural Causes, was issued in Australia and US in October 2011 and in Europe in January 2012. Alarum released their fourth album Circle's End in June 2020.

== History ==
Alarum is an Australian progressive metal and technical death metal band which formed in 1992 in Melbourne. The original line-up included Matthew Racovalis on drums, Mark A Evans and Christian Broome on guitar. Broome soon left the band. In 1994 Racovalis and Evans were joined by Luke Morris on vocals and Lester Perry on bass to record the track, "Silence", which was produced by Gary McKenzie; it appeared on the compilation album, Death Down Under (1994), on the Def label.

By late 1995 the line-up was Racovalis, Evans, Mark Palfreyman on bass guitar and vocals, and Scott Young on guitar.

Alarum is stylistically similar to early-1990s groups, Atheist and Cynic.

Alarum's first album, Fluid Motion, was self-released in 1998 on Prey Music. It had been recorded in August–September 1997 at the Back Beach Studio in Rye. Production was by Alarum and DW Norton (Superheist's guitarist). Norton also engineered the album and provided whispers, vocal noises and keyboards. Christian Renner of The Metal Crypt described Fluid Motion as moving from "hardcore thrash riffs to an almost jazz inspired riff effortlessly and having it sound like it all belongs" and "excellent guitar work with great riffs and brilliant leads to the incredible drum work".

Their second album, Eventuality..., was released in Australia and United States on Willowtip Records in October 2004 and in Europe on Earache Records in June 2005. The album had been recorded during 2004 at the same studio in Rye as their first but with Alarum and Theron Rennison co-producing. The Metal Forge's Simon Milburn praised the album as "chock full to the brim of frantic and over the top jazz-fused riffs and bass lines along with dynamic and effective drum fills and rolls and vocals that flick schizophrenically between melody and growl".

From April to June 2006 Alarum toured US with Necrophagist, Arsis, Cattle Decapitation and Neuraxis. They followed, in mid-June, with shows in the United Kingdom and Ireland supporting US death metal group, Obituary. By December that year Racovalis departed the band and a replacement was found in Rob Brens, and in May 2007 Young left the group. Young pursued his solo material and also worked with gothic metallers, Darkest Dawn before eventually joining The Levitation Hex. Also in May the group supported Obituary at a gig in Melbourne on the Australian leg of their Frozen in Time Tour. In 2009 Ryan Williams began playing guitar at the band's live gigs.

When Evans left Alarum in mid-2011 the band recruited John Sanders as his replacement with Williams becoming a full-time member. On 18 October that year the group's third album, Natural Causes, was issued in Australia and US, and in Europe in January 2012. The album had been recorded before Evans had left the group and Rennison was brought in again as their producer. Metal Review's Ramar Pittance sees the group are "honing their songwriting chops and producing some of their tightest compositions to date. What's most impressive about Alarum in 2011 is how responsibly the players wield their technical prowess. At their best, the band pens compositionally straightforward and hooky thrashers and inform them with their meticulously honed and delightfully djanky chops".

Rob Brens departed the band after 9 years in October 2015, being replaced by Grahame Goode (Infernal Method, Automation, Killrazor), and then replaced for live shows by Liam Weedall (Voros, Dyssidia). The band released their fourth album, Circle's End which featured Ben Hocking (The Levitation Hex, Aeon of Horus) on drums for the recording sessions.

== Members ==
=== Current ===
- Mark Palfreyman – bass (1995–present), lead vocals (1996–present), backing vocals (1995)
- Scott Young – guitar (1995–2007, 2013–present)
- John Sanders – guitar, backing vocals (2011–present)
- Jared Roberts – drums (2024–present; touring musician 2023–2024)

=== Former ===
- Mark Evans – guitar (1992–2011), guitar synthesizer (1998–2011)
- Matthew Racovalis – drums (1992–2007)
- Lester Perry – bass (1994)
- Luke Morris – lead vocals (1994–1996), bass (1994–1995)
- Rob Brens – drums (2007–2015)
- Ryan Williams – guitar (2011–2013; touring musician 2009–2013, 2024–2025)
- Graham Goode – drums (2015–2023)

== Discography ==
Studio album

- Fluid Motion (1998)
- Eventuality... (2004)
- Natural Causes (2011)
- Circle's End (2020)
- Recontinue (2024)

Demo

- Another World
- Blueprint
