= A Celebration of Guilt =

Studio album by Arsis
- Released: March 30, 2004
- Recorded: October–December, 2003
- Genres: Melodic death metal, technical death metal
- Length: 44:26
- Labels: Willowtip, Earache
- Producers: Steve Carr, Bob Gurske

Arsis chronology
A Celebration of Guilt (2004)	A Diamond for Disease (2005)

A Celebration of Guilt is the debut studio album released by American death metal band Arsis.

The album's sound has drawn comparisons to English extreme metal band Carcass, and has been described as "[picking] up where [the band's fourth studio album] Heartwork left off."

== Release ==
The album was released March 30, 2004 in North America by Willowtip and on July 11, 2005, in Europe via Earache Records. On August 9, 2011, Willowtip released a remastered version of A Celebration of Guilt, which included two bonus tracks.

== Critical reception ==
Professional ratings
Review scores
Source	Rating
AllMusic	4/5 stars
Metal Storm	9.0/10.0
Sputnikmusic	4.5/5.0

Following its release, it was met with very favorable reviews by online publications such as AllMusic, Metal Storm, and Sputnikmusic.

== Track listing ==
All tracks are written by Malone.

No.	Title	Length
1.	"The Face of My Innocence"	5:33
2.	"Maddening Disdain"	3:30
3.	"Seven Whispers Fell Silent"	3:46
4.	"Return"	4:42
5.	"Worship Depraved"	3:02
6.	"Carnal Ways to Recreate the Heart"	4:52
7.	"Dust and Guilt"	4:25
8.	"Elegant and Perverse"	2:23
9.	"The Sadistic Motives Behind Bereavement Letters"	4:25
10.	"Looking to Nothing"	3:22
11.	"Wholly Night"	4:20
Total length:		44:20

Deluxe limited gatefold LP
No.	Title	Length
1.	"The Face of My Innocence"	5:33
2.	"Maddening Disdain"	3:30
3.	"Seven Whispers Fell Silent"	3:46
4.	"Return"	4:42
5.	"Worship Depraved"	3:02
6.	"Carnal Ways to Recreate the Heart"	4:52
7.	"Dust and Guilt"	4:25
8.	"Elegant and Perverse"	2:23
9.	"The Sadistic Motives Behind Bereavement Letters"	4:25
10.	"Looking to Nothing"	3:22

Deluxe limited gatefold LP bonus 7"
No.	Title	Length
11.	"Wholly Night"	4:20
12.	"Painted Eyes"	3:50
13.	"Veil of Mourning Black"	3:02

Remastered, deluxe reissue
No.	Title	Length
1.	"The Face of My Innocence"	5:33
2.	"Maddening Disdain"	3:30
3.	"Seven Whispers Fell Silent"	3:46
4.	"Return"	4:42
5.	"Worship Depraved"	3:02
6.	"Carnal Ways to Recreate the Heart"	4:52
7.	"Dust and Guilt"	4:25
8.	"Elegant and Perverse"	2:23
9.	"The Sadistic Motives Behind Bereavement Letters"	4:25
10.	"Looking to Nothing"	3:22
11.	"Wholly Night"	4:20
12.	"Painted Eyes" (bonus track)	3:50
13.	"Veil of Mourning Black" (bonus track)	3:02

== Personnel ==
- James Malone – vocals, guitars, bass
- Mike Van Dyne – drums

== Production ==
- Bob Gurske - engineering
- Steve Carr - mixing, mastering
- Mark Riddick - artwork, layout
