= Heirs to Thievery =

Studio album by Misery Index
- Released: May 11, 2010
- Recorded: Jan 2010
- Genre: Death metal, grindcore
- Length: 34:21
- Label: Relapse
- Producer: Misery Index, Steve Wright

Misery Index chronology
| Traitors (2008) | Heirs to Thievery (2010) | The Killing Gods (2014) |

Heirs to Thievery is the fourth full-length album by American death metal band Misery Index. It was released by Relapse Records on May 11, 2010. It is the band's final album with lead guitarist Sparky Voyles.

== Track listing ==
| No. | Title | Lyrics | Music | Length |
|---|---|---|---|---|
| 1. | "Embracing Extinction" | Jason Netherton | Adam Jarvis, Mark Klöppel | 1:49 |
| 2. | "Fed to the Wolves" | Netherton | Jarvis, Sparky Voyles | 3:47 |
| 3. | "The Carrion Call" | Netherton | Jarvis, Klöppel | 3:46 |
| 4. | "Heirs to Thievery" | Netherton | Jarvis, Klöppel | 2:53 |
| 5. | "The Spectator" | Netherton | Jarvis, Netherton | 3:04 |
| 6. | "The Illuminaught" | Klöppel | Jarvis, Klöppel | 3:54 |
| 7. | "The Seventh Cavalry" | Klöppel, Netherton | Jarvis, Klöppel | 4:44 |
| 8. | "Plague of Objects" | Netherton | Jarvis, Netherton | 3:08 |
| 9. | "You Lose" | Klöppel | Jarvis, Klöppel | 2:30 |
| 10. | "Sleeping Giants" | Netherton | Jarvis, Netherton | 2:56 |
| 11. | "Day of the Dead" | Mough Alvarado, Klöppel | Jarvis, Klöppel | 1:50 |
| Total length: | | | | 34:21 |

== Personnel ==
=== Misery Index ===
- Adam Jarvis – drums
- Mark Klöppel – vocals, guitar
- Jason Netherton – vocals, bass guitar
- Sparky Voyles – guitar

=== Additional musicians ===
- Mough Alvarado – vocals ("Day of the Dead")
- John Gallagher – vocals ("Sleeping Giants")
- Rich Johnson – vocals ("Embracing Extinction", "Heirs to Thievery")
- Vince Matthews – vocals ("You Lose")
- Erik Rutan – vocals ("The Illuminaught")

=== Production ===
- Steve Wright – production, engineering
- Misery Index – production
- Noah Gary – additional engineering
- Drew Lamond – additional engineering
