= Starve for the Devil =

Studio album by Arsis
- Released: February 9, 2010
- Recorded: Planet Z Studios
- Genres: Melodic death metal, technical death metal
- Length: 44:17
- Label: Nuclear Blast
- Producer: Zeuss

Arsis chronology
We Are the Nightmare (2008)	Starve for the Devil (2010)	Lepers Caress (2012)

Professional ratings
Review scores
Source	Rating
Allmusic	4/5 stars
Rock Sound	link
Sputnikmusic	link

Starve for the Devil is the fourth studio album by American melodic death metal band Arsis. It was released on February 9, 2010, by Nuclear Blast Records. This is the only album to feature Nick Cordle, Nathaniel Carter, and Mike Van Dyne on guitar, bass and drums, respectively. This album also marks the return of their original drummer, Mike Van Dyne before his departure on 2011.

== History ==
Recording started in September 2009 at Planet Z Studios. Production was handled by Chris "Zeuss" Harris, who is best known for his work with Rob Zombie, Queensrÿche, Hatebreed, Overkill, and many others. The album artwork was handled by Mark Riddick, who worked with Arsis on all of their earlier releases. Starve for the Devil debuted at No. 13 on the Billboard Top New Artist Albums (Heatseekers) chart, making it the highest charting Arsis album.

Although Starve for the Devil was originally scheduled for a January 15 release date, it was pushed back into February with an announcement that a bonus track would be included on the European and Asian releases, and that two bonus tracks would be included on the limited Nuclear Blast mail order and vinyl editions. However, the second bonus track, a cover version of King Diamond's "The Lake", was pulled and only made available on the EMI compilation March is Metal Month 2010.

In January, 2010, Arsis released a music video for "Forced to Rock", the first track on Starve for the Devil.

== Reception ==
Starve for the Devil received positive reviews from numerous publications, including Metal Assault, Blistering, The Metal Files, Metal Injection, Pop Matters, and About.com.

== Track listing ==
All songs written by James Malone, except where noted.

No.	Title	Music	Length
1.	"Forced to Rock"		2:56
2.	"A March for the Sick"		4:23
3.	"From Soulless to Shattered (Art in Dying)"	Cordle	4:27
4.	"Beyond Forlorn"		4:01
5.	"The Ten of Swords"		3:44
6.	"Closer to Cold"	Cordle	5:08
7.	"Sick Perfection"	Malone, Corrdle	3:55
8.	"Half Past Corpse O'Clock"		4:12
9.	"Escape Artist"	Cordle	4:22
10.	"Sable Rising"		3:36
Total length:			44:17

Limited edition bonus track
No.	Title	Length
11.	"A Pound of Flesh (For the Hell of It)"	3:27
Total length:		47:44

== Credits ==
=== Personnel ===
- James Malone - vocals, rhythm guitar
- Nick Cordle - lead guitar
- Nathaniel Carter - bass
- Mike Van Dyne - drums

=== Production ===
- Chris "Zeuss" Harris - engineering, mixing, mastering
- Mark Riddick - artwork, layout
- Tonya Rose - design
