= We Are the Nightmare =

Studio album by Arsis
- Released: April 15, 2008
- Recorded: 2007
- Studio: Planet Z Studios
- Genres: Melodic death metal, technical death metal, blackened death metal
- Length: 40:47
- Label: Nuclear Blast
- Producer: Zeuss

Arsis chronology
United in Regret (2006)	We Are the Nightmare (2008)	Starve for the Devil (2010)

Professional ratings
Review scores
Source	Rating
AllMusic	(favorable)

We Are the Nightmare is the third studio album by American melodic death metal band Arsis. It was released April 15, 2008, via Nuclear Blast Records. This is the only album to feature Ryan Knight and Darren Cesca on guitar and drums, respectively. This is also the only album to feature Noah Martin on bass before his departure in 2008.

== History ==
Recording began on the September 3, 2007, at Planet Z Studios in Massachusetts and ended on October 19. It was produced by Zeuss who has previously worked on Shadows Fall and Hatebreed albums. James Malone, the primary songwriter and founding member, commented that the music is much more varied than anything they had ever written.

== Track listing ==
All songs written by James Malone.

No.	Title	Length
1.	"We Are the Nightmare"	4:03
2.	"Shattering the Spell"	4:04
3.	"Sightless Wisdom"	3:39
4.	"Servants of the Night"	4:16
5.	"Failing Winds of Hopeless Greed"	3:36
6.	"Overthrown"	3:45
7.	"Progressive Entrapment"	4:17
8.	"A Feast for the Liar's Tongue"	3:48
9.	"My Oath to Madness"	3:54
10.	"Failure's Conquest"	5:25
Total length:		40:47

== Credits ==
=== Personnel ===
- James Malone – lead vocals, rhythm guitar
- Ryan Knight – lead guitar
- Noah Martin – bass
- Darren Cesca – drums, backing vocals

=== Production ===
- Chris 'Zeuss' Harris – engineering, mixing
- Alan Douches – mastering
- Mark Riddick – artwork, layout
