= Misery Index (band) =

American death metal band

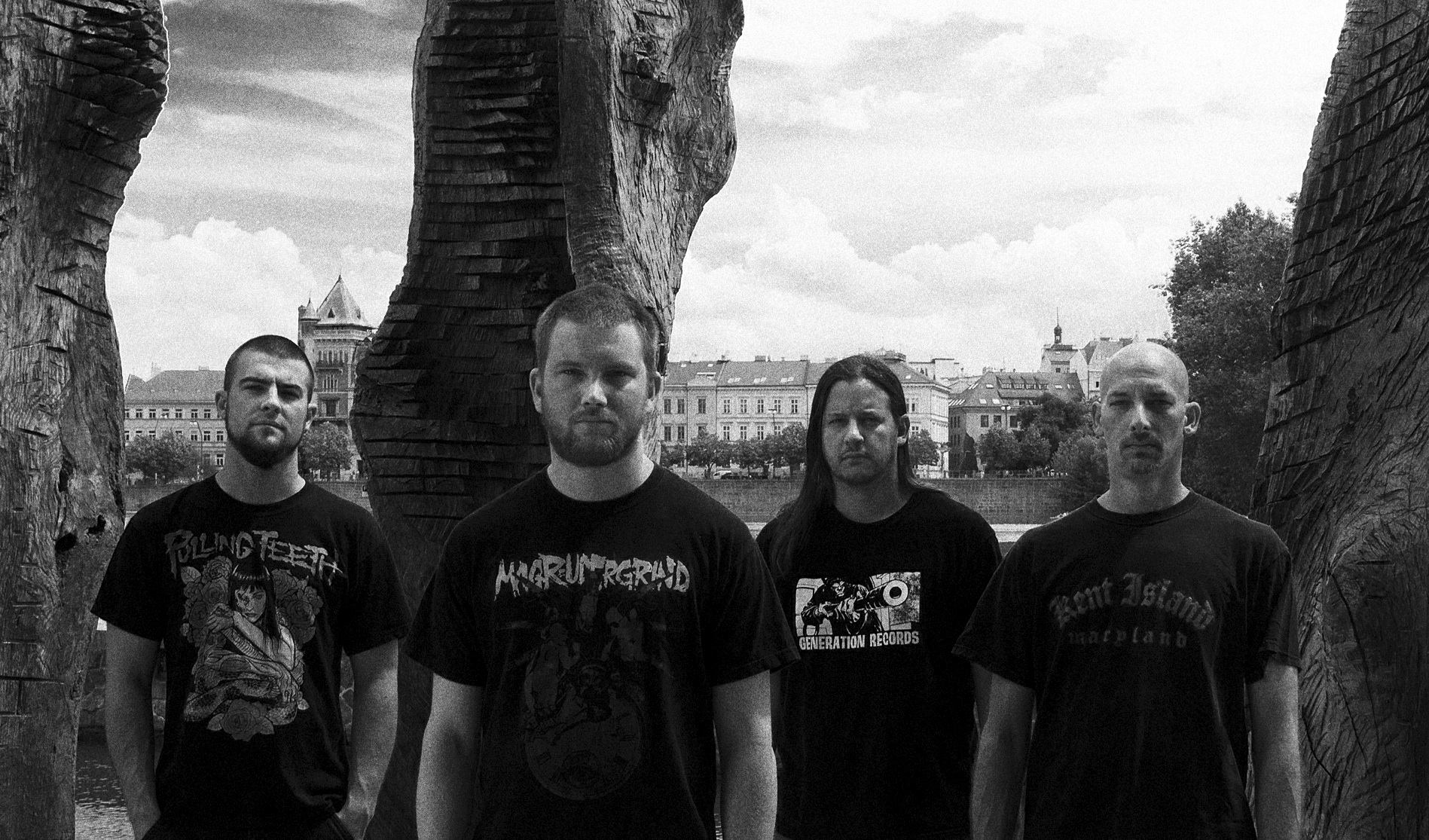
- Misery Index in Prague (2011)

Background information
- Origin: Baltimore, Maryland, US
- Genres: Death metal, grindcore
- Years active: 2001–present
- Labels: Nuclear Blast, Relapse, Anarchos, Season of Mist, Century Media
- Members: Jason Netherton; Mark Kloeppel; Adam Jarvis; Darrin Morris
- Past members: Kevin Talley; Mike Harrison; Matt Byers; Bruce Greig; John Voyles
- Website: www.miseryindex.com

Misery Index is an American death metal band formed in 2001 in Baltimore, Maryland, United States, by Jason Netherton (bass, vocals), Mike Harrison (guitar, vocals), and Kevin Talley (drums). In 2003, the band opened for Dying Fetus and Skinless on their North American tour. From 2006–2010, its line-up consisted of Jason Netherton on bass and vocals, John Voyles on lead guitar, Mark Kloeppel on rhythm guitar and vocals, and Adam Jarvis on drums. In 2010, Voyles left the band and was replaced with Darrin Morris.

== Background ==
Misery Index's music is best described as death metal with hardcore punk and grindcore influences. Its lyrics are critical of power structures in modern culture, everyday life, and the ills of modern society. Their name derives from the economic indicator of the same name, which was also the namesake of the last album by Assück, from whom Misery Index also draw inspiration. Through the years, the band toured extensively, performing over 1000 concerts in 44 countries from 2002 to 2013.

The band runs its own record label, Anarchos Records, through which it has released a handful of titles, including its debut EP Overthrow in 2001, the Dissent EP in 2004, and the 2010 compilation Pulling Out the Nails. Misery Index's debut album, Retaliate, was released on Nuclear Blast Records in 2003. The band signed to Relapse Records in January, 2006, and released its second album, Discordia, in May 2006. Traitors, the band's third album, was released in September 2008 and its fourth album, Heirs to Thievery, was released May 11, 2010. In June 2011, the band signed to Season of Mist Records, and released its fifth full-length, The Killing Gods, in May 2014. On March 8, 2019, the band released their sixth album, Rituals of Power. In 2020, the band signed with Century Media Records and released their seventh album, Complete Control in May 2022.

== Members ==
=== Current ===
- Jason Netherton – bass, lead vocals (2001–present)
- Adam Jarvis – drums (2004–present)
- Mark Kloeppel – rhythm guitar, co-lead vocals (2005–present)
- Darrin Morris – lead guitar (2010–present)

=== Former ===
- John "Sparky" Voyles – lead guitar (2001–2010)
- Kevin Talley – drums (2001–2002, 2004)
- Mike Harrison – rhythm guitar, co-lead vocals (2001–2002)
- Matt Byers – drums (2002–2004)
- Bruce Greig – rhythm guitar (2003–2004; died 2022)

== Discography ==
=== Studio albums ===
- Retaliate (2003)
- Discordia (2006)
- Traitors (2008)
- Heirs to Thievery (2010)
- The Killing Gods (2014)
- Rituals of Power (2019)
- Complete Control (2022)

=== EPs ===
- Overthrow CD/12" (2001)
- Misery Index / Commit Suicide split CD (2002)
- Misery Index / Structure of Lies split CD (2003)
- Dissent CD/12" (2004)
- Misery Index / Bathtub Shitter split 7-inch (2006)
- Hang Em High 7-inch (2007)
- Misery Index / Mumakil split CD/7" (2007)
- Misery Index / Lock Up split 7-inch (2011)
- Misery Index / I Disavow 7-inch (2018)

=== Other releases ===
- Dead Sam Walking (Compilation) Digital only (2008)
- Pulling Out the Nails (Compilation) CD/LP (2010)
- Live in Munich LP (2013)
- Coffin Up the Nails (Compilation) CD/LP/Cassette (2021)

=== Music videos ===
- The Great Depression (2004)
- Conquistadores (2006)
- Traitors (2008)
- The Calling (2014)
- The Harrowing (2015)
- New Salem (2018)
- Naysayer (2019)
- Hammering the Nails (2019)
- Decline and Fall (2019)
- The Eaters and the Eaten (2022)
- Complete Control (2022)
- Rites of Cruelty (2023)
