= The Hinderers =

Studio album by Dååth
- Released: March 20, 2007
- Genres: Death metal, groove metal
- Length: 49:09
- Label: Roadrunner
- Producers: James Murphy, Dååth

Dååth chronology
Futility (2004)	The Hinderers (2007)	The Concealers (2009)

Professional ratings
Review scores
Source	Rating
AllMusic	4.5/5 stars
Thrash Hits	4.5/6 stars

The Hinderers is Dååth's second studio album produced by Dååth and James Murphy, and released by Roadrunner Records. It contains guest solos by James Murphy and James Malone (of Arsis). Two music videos were produced, one each for the songs "Subterfuge" and "Festival Mass Soulform".

== Track listing ==
All tracks are written by Mike Kameron and Eyal Levi.

No.	Title	Length
1.	"Subterfuge"	3:39
2.	"From the Blind"	3:47
3.	"Cosmic Forge"	4:27
4.	"Sightless"	3:17
5.	"Under a Somber Sign"	3:36
6.	"Ovum"	3:27
7.	"Festival Mass Soulform"	3:16
8.	"Above Lucium"	4:08
9.	"Who Will Take the Blame?"	4:12
10.	"War Born (Tri-Adverserenade)"	2:01
11.	"Dead on the Dance Floor"	3:55
12.	"Blessed Through Misery"	4:11
13.	"The Hinderers"	4:23
14.	"Inversion" (Japanese bonus track)	6:12

== Personnel ==
Dååth

- Mike Kameron - vocals, keyboards
- Emil Werstler - guitar
- Eyal Levi - guitar
- Jeremy Creamer - bass
- Kevin Talley - drums

Additional

- Colin Richardson - mixer
- Sean Farber - touring vocalist

Guest appearances

- James Murphy (ex-Death, ex-Testament, ex-Obituary) - guitar solo on track 9.
- James Malone (of Arsis) - guitar solo on track 12.
