= Discordia (album) =

Studio album by Misery Index
- Released: May 16, 2006
- Recorded: January – February 2006 at Hairy Breakfast Studios in Atlanta, Georgia
- Genre: Death metal, grindcore
- Length: 33:06
- Label: Relapse
- Producer: Eyal Levi, Misery Index

Misery Index chronology
Retaliate (2003)	Discordia (2006)	Traitors (2008)

Professional ratings
Review scores
Source	Rating
Allmusic	3.5/5 stars
Stylus Magazine	B

Discordia is the second studio album by American death metal band Misery Index, released in 2006.

== Track listing ==
No.	Title	Lyrics	Music	Length
1.	"Unmarked Graves"	Netherton	Netherton, Jarvis	4:47
2.	"Conquistadores"	Netherton	Netherton, Jarvis	3:36
3.	"Outsourcing Jehovah"	Netherton	Kloeppel, Jarvis	2:52
4.	"Breathing Pestilence"	Netherton	Kloeppel, Jarvis	3:15
5.	"Meet Reality"	Netherton	Netherton, Jarvis	2:27
6.	"Sensory Deprivation"	Netherton	Voyles, Jarvis	4:14
7.	"The Medusa Stare"	Netherton	Voyles, Jarvis	2:14
8.	"Dystopian Nightmares"	Netherton	Kloeppel, Jarvis	2:54
9.	"Discordia"	Netherton	Kloeppel, Jarvis	4:27
10.	"Pandemican"	Kloeppel	Kloeppel, Jarvis	2:20
Total length:				33:06

== Personnel ==
- Jason Netherton – bass, vocals
- Mark Kloeppel – guitar, vocals
- Sparky Voyles – guitar
- Adam Jarvis – drums
- Andy Huskey – vocals ("Pandemican")

=== Production ===
- Eyal Levi – engineering, mixing, production
- Reagan Wexler – assistant engineering, assistant mixing
- Rodney Mills – mastering
- Gary Fly – photography
- Timothy Leo – artwork design
- Greg Houston – artwork
