= Hang Em High (EP) =

EP by Misery Index
- Released: February 8, 2007
- Genre: Deathgrind
- Length: 7:01
- Label: Garden of Exile

Hang Em High is a 7-inch EP by American deathgrind band Misery Index. It was released on February 8, 2007, to coincide with their 2007 European tour. 1000 were to be made originally, but this was later reduced to 800 due to a problem at the pressing plant.

Alongside the new tracks, it features an acoustic version of the song "Discordia" from the album Discordia.

== Track listing ==
=== Side A ===
1. "Hang Em High" – 1:03
2. "Scene and Not Heard" – 1:38
3. "Love It or Leave It" – 1:07

=== Side B ===
1. "Discordia" (acoustic) – 3:13
