= Xerath =

British metal band

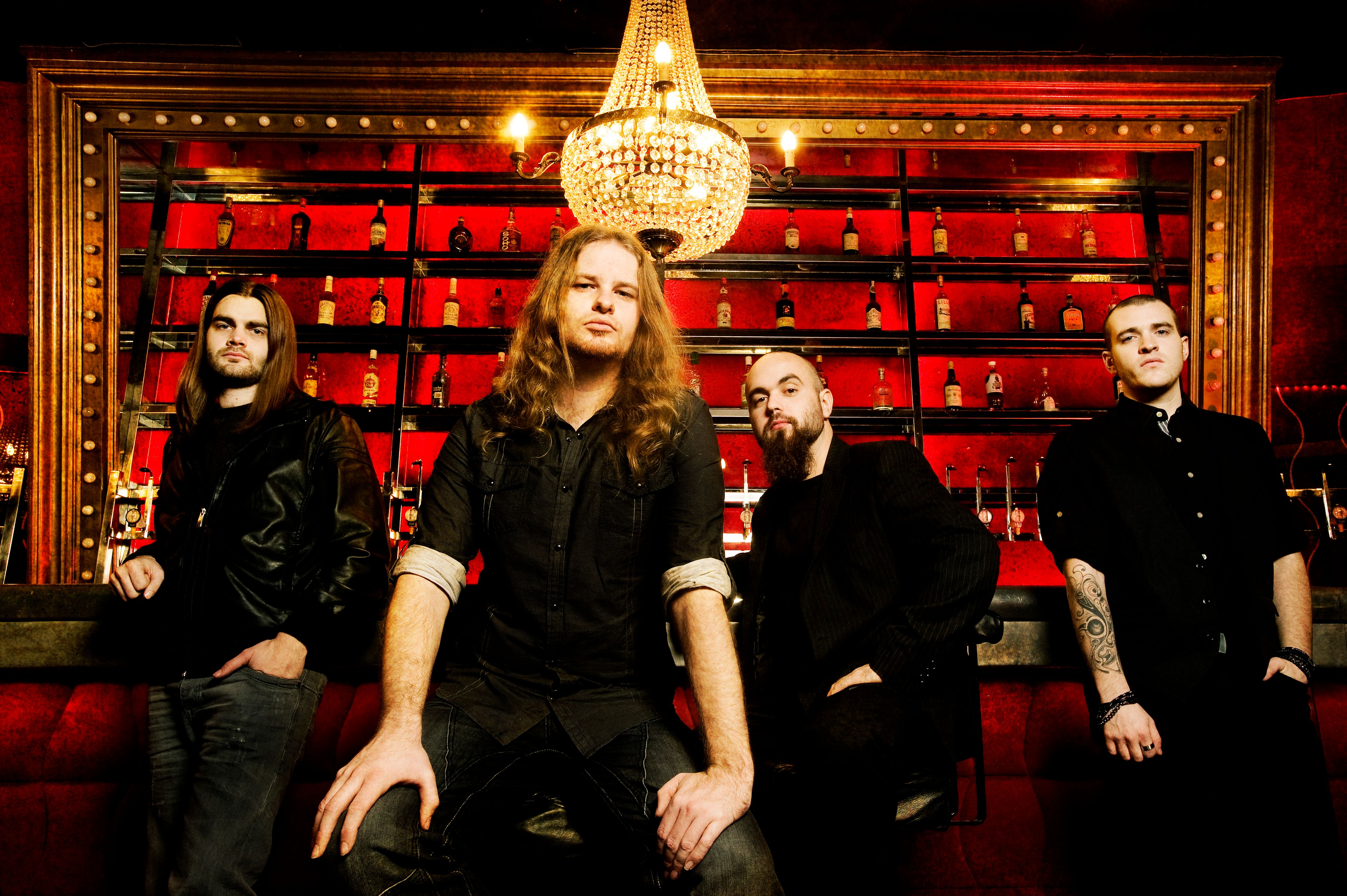

Background information
- Origin: Basingstoke, Hampshire, England
- Genres: Extreme metal, progressive metal, symphonic metal, groove metal, djent
- Years active: 2007–2017; 2024–present
- Labels: Candlelight
- Members: Richard Thomson; Michael Pitman; Conor McGouran; Owain Williams; Christopher Clark
- Past members: Andy Phillips; Steve Woodcock; Ben Wanders

Xerath is an English heavy metal band from Basingstoke, Hampshire. Formed in 2007, the band gained international recognition after the release of their debut album I (One) via Candlelight Records in 2009, a record label they stuck with throughout their existence.

Containing elements of progressive, death, thrash and symphonic metal, Xerath's music is characterized by the mix of polyrhythmic guitar riffing and drumming, with orchestral and symphonic elements. Xerath cited their influences as Strapping Young Lad, Dimmu Borgir, and Opeth as well as film score composition and an eclectic mix of other bands and genres.

After nearly a decade of touring and three album releases (named sequentially I, II and III), the group disbanded in early 2017. They announced that they are writing new material in mid-September 2024.

== History ==
=== Formation of band ===
Xerath was the brainchild of its first guitarist, Andy Phillips, who formed the band in 2007 with drummer Michael Pitman, bassist Owain Williams and Richard Thomson as an experiment to combine film score style composition and classical music with technical heavy metal. The idea was to try and take advantage of a direction that metal music had failed to exploit, with the rare exceptions of bands like Dimmu Borgir.

In that first year, Xerath won the Terrorizer Magazine best unsigned band competition based on reader votes, which led to, in early 2008, signing their first record deal with Candlelight Records, a record label they remained with for their entire history.

=== Success ===
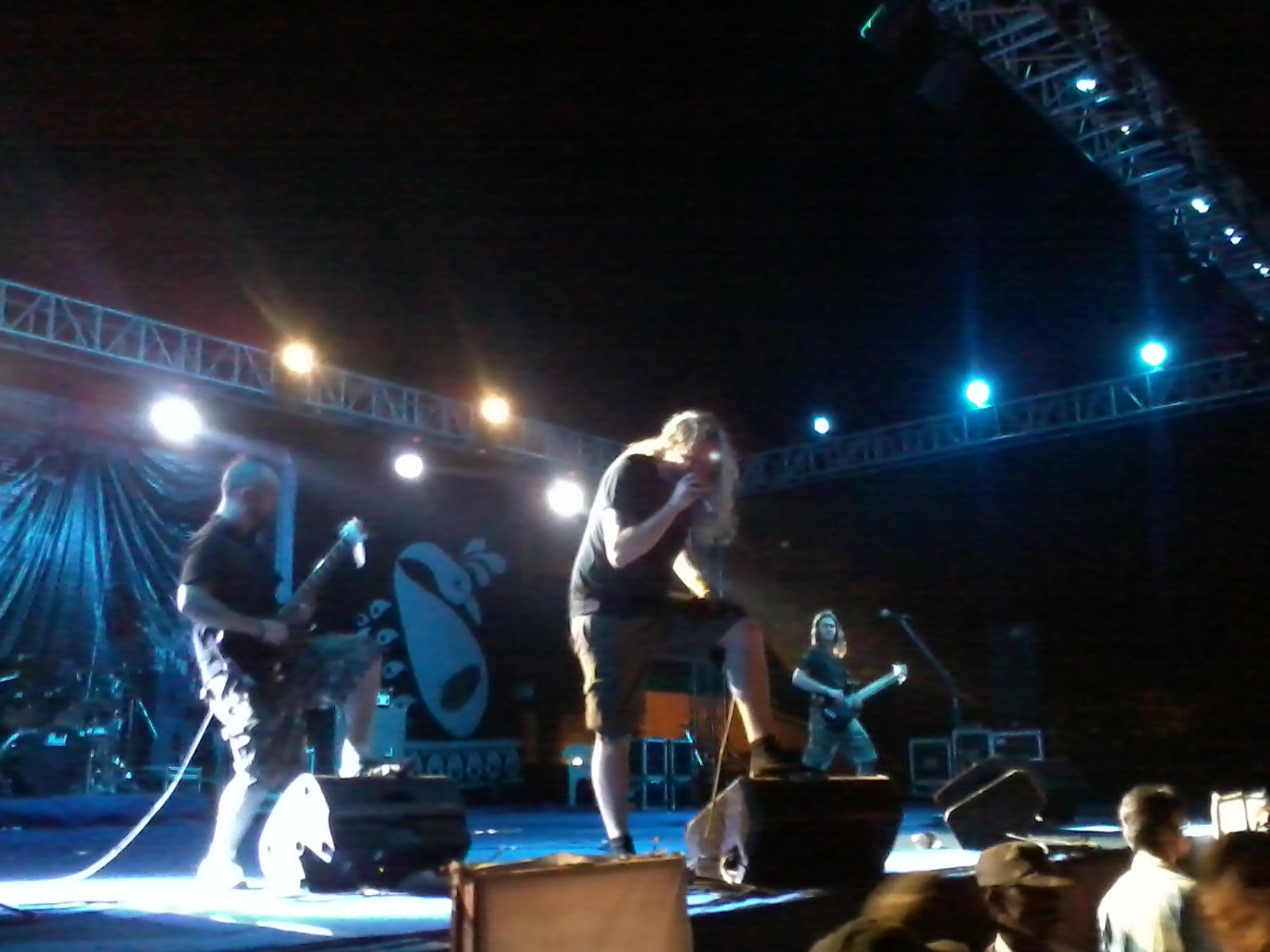
Xerath play at SpringSpree in 2011 during a tour of India

Xerath released their debut CD entitled I (One) in May 2009; this was followed by their first notable live performance at Bloodstock Open Air festival. They went on to become regulars at the festival, playing there in 2011, 2013 and 2015.

By the time their second album, II (Two), was released on 3 May 2011, Owain Williams was the lead-guitarist and the band was a well-established success; they were touring China and India, and were often seen at Europe's music festivals such as Euroblast.

Their third and final album III (Three), with new lead-guitarist Conor McGouran, was released in September 2014.

=== Demise ===
Xerath's lead guitarist position changed twice in their history. Andy Phillips, the band's principle founder and first lead-guitarist was replaced by former bassist Owain Williams, who was in turn replaced by guitarist Conor McGouran in 2013. The average of one lead guitarist per album released did not dampen the success of the band, but in 2016 both the bassist and drummer changed and splits in the direction that Xerath needed to go started to appear. Richard Thomson was the band's only remaining founding member when they announced their disbandment on 1 February 2017 via an announcement on their Facebook page. Their final recording, Regret, was released online along with the announcement. Their planned fourth album was never completed, officially announced nor named, but it was often mentioned and referred to as IV or IIII (four) based on their previous album names.

Two members went on to team up with Jørn Lande, ZP Theart and others in the band Pentakill, whose second album (prefixed with a Xerath-like II) topped the iTunes metal chart shortly thereafter.

=== Reunion ===
Xerath announced that they are currently writing new material in mid-September 2024.

== Band members ==
=== Current lineup ===
- Richard Thomson – vocals, orchestration, programming
- Michael Pitman – drums
- Conor McGouran – guitars
- Owain Williams – guitars
- Christopher Clark – bass

=== Previous members ===
- Andy Phillips – guitars
- Steve Woodcock – bass
- Ben Wanders – drums

== Discography ==
=== Studio albums ===
All three of Xerath's albums were released by Candlelight Records.

- I (2009)
- II (2011)
- III (2014)

=== Extended Plays ===
- The Covers (2023)

=== Singles ===
- The Moment I Knew (2017)
- Regret (2017)
