= The Concealers =

Studio album by Dååth
- Released: April 21, 2009
- Genre: Technical death metal, groove metal
- Length: 41:27
- Label: Century Media
- Producer: Jason Suecof, Mark Lewis

Dååth chronology
| The Hinderers (2007) | The Concealers (2009) | Dååth (2010) |

Professional ratings
Review scores
| Source | Rating |
|---|---|
| AllMusic | 2.5/5 stars |
| Chronicles of Chaos | 6/10 |

The Concealers is the third studio album by American metal band Dååth.

"Day of Endless Light" is the only track on this album with a music video.

== Track listing ==
All tracks are written by Dååth.

| No. | Title | Length |
|---|---|---|
| 1. | "Sharpen the Blades" | 3:23 |
| 2. | "Self-Corruption Manifesto" | 3:56 |
| 3. | "The Worthless" | 4:20 |
| 4. | "The Unbinding Truth" | 4:23 |
| 5. | "Silenced" | 3:06 |
| 6. | "Wilting on the Vine" | 4:46 |
| 7. | "Translucent Potency" | 4:55 |
| 8. | "Day of Endless Light" | 4:13 |
| 9. | "Duststorm" | 1:02 |
| 10. | "...Of Poisoned Sorrows" | 5:02 |
| 11. | "Incestuous Amplification" | 2:14 |

== Personnel ==
Dååth

- Sean Zatorsky - vocals
- Eyal Levi – guitar, synthesizer
- Jeremy Creamer – bass guitar
- Emil Werstler – guitar
- Kevin Talley – drums

Production

- Mike Fuller – mastering
- Jorden Haley – artwork, design
- Michael Kameron – additional lyrics, research
- Mark Lewis – engineer, mixing
- Jason Suecof – producer, engineer, mixing, sound design
