= Omega Diatribe =

Hungarian metal band

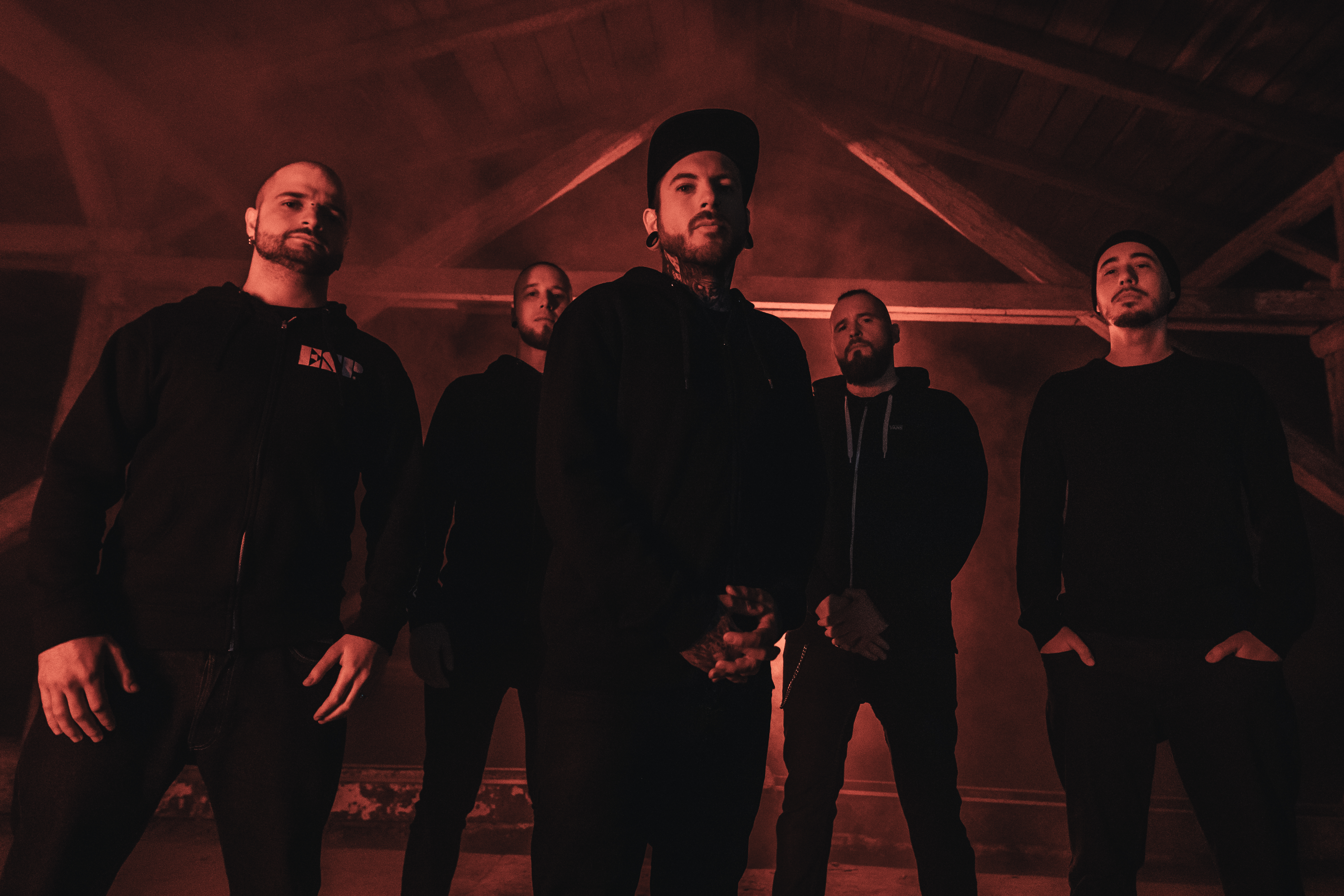
- Omega Diatribe in 2021

Background information
- Origin: Budapest, Hungary
- Genres: Groove metal, heavy metal, djent
- Years active: 2012–present
- Labels: La Bam, Twin Peak, Independent Ear, Metal Scrap Records
- Members: Milán Lucsányi; Ákos Szathmáry; Gergő Hájer; Tamás Höflinger; Dániel Szabó
- Past members: Jeromos Nagy; Dávid Metzger; Gergely Komáromi; Attila Császár; Richárd Szupszenik; Tommy Kiss
- Website: omegadiatribe.com

Omega Diatribe is a Hungarian groove metal band from Budapest.

== History ==
Omega Diatribe was formed in 2008 by Gergõ Hájer (guitar) and Ákos Szathmáry (bass). They started to play live in 2012 with a five-piece lineup. The band grew in popularity with their intense life shows and powerful sound.

In 2013, Omega Diatribe released their full-length debut album entitled IAPETUS. IAPETUS contains ten songs. The band recorded the CD at their own studio at 515 Studio. The album was nominated the 'Best Album of the Year' and 'Best Studio Production' in Hungary, and landed in second place.

In 2014, the band split ways with Dávid Metzger (drummer) and started to work with American drummer Kevin Talley on new material. Omega Diatribe released their new EP called Abstract Ritual on 26 February 2015.

In the summer of 2015, they signed to the US-based record label Independent Ear Records. Thanks to this, Omega Diatribe's record Abstract Ritual was released in the US on 11 September 2015, including a remixed bonus track by Hungarian electro artist dOTS.

The band released a new single in the beginning of 2016 called "Contrist". The release also contains an exclusive cover of Slipknot's anthem. By 2016, the band was mostly playing abroad and at festivals such as Euroblast with hopes of playing for their fans at even more locations.

Omega Diatribe released their third studio record called Trinity in 2018, which was co-produced, mixed and mastered by Danish producer Tue Madsen at Antfarm Studios. Trinity was released under the Ukrainian record label Metal Scrap Records. After an intense tour season, the band has won the 'Best Live Band' and 'Best Album of the Year' awards at Hungarian Metal Awards in 2018.

In 2020, they released their fourth studio record Metanoia under the wings of Metal Scrap Records, which was mastered by Swedish producer Jens Bogren at Fascination Street Studios.

== Members ==
- Gergely Komáromi – vocals (2011–present)
- Ákos Szathmáry – bass (2008–present)
- Gergő Hájer – guitar and vocals (2008–present)
- János Kelemen – guitar (2010–present)
- Adolf Gróf – drums (2023–present)
- Dávid Metzger – drums (2010–2014)
- Jeromos Nagy – drums (2008–2010)

== Discography ==
Albums

- 2012: Forty Minutes (demo)
- 2013: IAPETUS (album)
- 2014: Hydrozoan Periods (single)
- 2015: Abstract Ritual (EP)
- 2016: Contrist (single)
- 2018: Trinity (album)
- 2020: Metanoia (album)

Music videos

- "Unshadowed Days" (2014)
- "Contrist" (2016)
- "Hydrozoan Periods" (2016)
- "Divine of Nature" (2018)
- "Souls Collide" (2018)
- "Chain Reaction" (2018)
- "Trinity" (2019)
- "Baby's Got a Temper" (The Prodigy cover) (2019)
- "Parallel" (2020)
- "Mirror Neuron" (2020)
