= SpringSpree =

Spring Spree
- Genre: Student Run, Non-Profit Cultural Event
- Locations: Warangal, India
- Founded: 1978
- Attendance: 10,000 footfalls, 600 colleges
- Sponsor: National Institute of Technology Warangal
- Website: www.springspree.in

SpringSpree, sometimes written as Spring Spree and popularly known as Spree, is the annual cultural festival of the National Institute of Technology, Warangal.

== Conception ==
Shobha Naidu at Spring Spree 2010

It started as an intercollegiate annual sports and cultural event held between January and March. The idea was that they should have an annual gathering to showcase their skills in the non-technical aspects. The students in the college came from different regions of the country, the fest would also be instrumental in binding them together as diverse citizens of a united country. It would also serve as a platform for people to recognize and respect the diverse regions of the country for what they are. This idea gained huge prominence and it was conducted annually till the early 2000s. This was the first ever cultural fest in the whole of South India and has maintained ranks among its best few. After early 2000s in 2006 the clubs and committees of the college conducted a small level fest called Elysium. The revival was complete when, in 2007, Spring Spree was brought back and has since been an annual event. Spree took a huge jump where, one of the India's best playback singer KK and one of the top 10 finalists of Indian Idol performed live for Spring Spree 2013. 2014 saw the likes of Suraj Jagan and Suchitra perform. The first pronite was a Sunburn Campus nite and bands like Baiju Dharmajan Syndicate and Gino Banks performed. Spring Spree is now one of the largest cultural festivals of India.

== Events ==
=== Competitions ===
Spring Spree conducts over 75 events in the span of 3 days, with various events in the fields of art, literature, drama, dance, music, photography and painting which include 7 Spotlights Allure - Fashion Show, IRA - Rock band Competition, Idol - Singing Competition, Tear it Up - BBoying Competition, NITMUN - NIT Model United Nations, War of DJs - DJ Competition. Other popular events include Chitr- Painting Competition, StreetX - Street Football and Gully Cricket, Dance Events - Group, Solo and Pair Dance, Director's Cut - Short Film Contest, Skit, Sand Arts, T-shirt Designing, Tattoo making and many more. In 2013 it had an ethical hacking workshop conducted by. Various clubs and departmental societies also conduct events, such as CSES Arcade. To cater to the young entrepreneurs there sessions involving business planning and stock marketing are a part and parcel of Spring Spree. Spring Spree not only serves as a platform for art buffs and dance enthusiasts but it also serves as a great platform for analysts and hackers also.

==== Spotlights ====
Spotlights are mainstream events in SpringSpree. These events are a part and parcel of Spree. the spotlights are Open Air by Music Club NIT Warangal, one of the biggest clubs on campus, Allure - Fashion Show, IRA - Rock band Competition, Idol - Singing Competition, Tear it Up - BBoying Competition, GameDome - Video Gaming, NITMUN - NIT Model United Nations, War of DJs - DJ Competition. The spotlights receive a lot of attention for their adrenaline and the cash prizes. They are well attended in terms of participation and audience.

===== Open Air =====
Open Air is the flagship event of Music Club NIT Warangal, which usually marks the inaugural of Spring Spree every year. Typically a concert of about three hours, this event boasts a huge turnout of at least 1500 people every year, making it one of the biggest events of Spring Spree every year.

===== Idol =====
Idol is the mainstream competition for singers.

===== iRA =====
iRA is a competition held between homegrown college rock bands. The contestant bands perform their own rock music compositions and the winner is decided by the crowd.

===== Allure =====
Spring spree boasts of Allure a competition for the fashionista of India. 2011 saw a faceoff between the host and SRM, Chennai. The competition is judged by people matching up to the level of glamour that it provides. Usually the judges are models, actresses or others related to the fashion world. Spring Spree 2010 and 2011 saw judges like Rakhi Sharma and Mahima Sandoval (Miss Spain 2009 contestant) as judges.

In 2013 it was judged by TIA KAR and in 2014 by Sobhita Dhulipala. Eyetex Dazzler will be sponsoring Allure for 2015.

===== Tear It Up =====
B’boying crews across India are invited to compete with each other in this Spotlight event. Popular crews like Freak N’ Style have graced the occasion. Tear it Up generally sees participation from five to six colleges every year and has been part of Spring Spree for more than five years. In 2014 the winner of the world B'boying championship judged the competition.

Dancing crews are asked to pick a song of their choice to which they must do their routine. They must prove and showcase their creativity, synchronization, uniqueness, song choice, attitude, overall ability to dance etc. Participants must advance through a various number of rounds to reach the finals. Spring Spree 2011 saw German B’Boying legend Zeb.roc.ski do some of his famous moves, as well as head the judging panel.

===== NITMUN (National Institute of Technology Model United Nations) =====
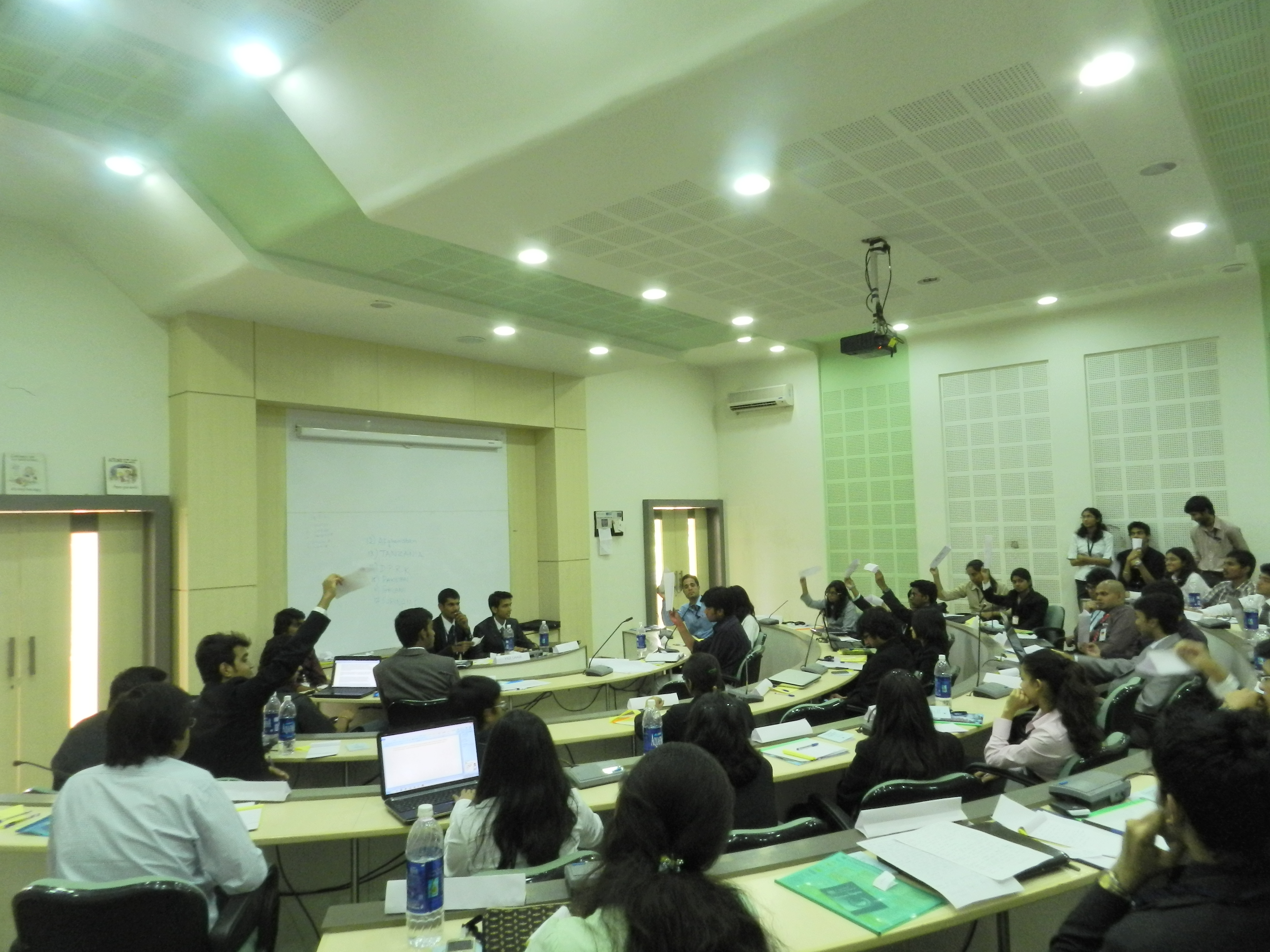
The General Assembly, NITMUN

Students from participating colleges are assigned their countries prior to the start of the Model United Nations event. They are required to do previous research on their respective countries, the issues their countries face, and possible the possible outcomes of the policies they are to follow. In the NITW simulation of the United Nations, the delegates from various colleges will engage in discussions to converge on resolutions and policies about current, pressing issues. Delegates are encouraged to present solutions to the problems presented in each discussion.

=== Pronites ===
Pronites are what Spring Spree calls the concerts conducted during the three days of Spree. Famous musicians are invited to close each day of the fest with a bang. In the years prior, NITW has seen the likes of Naresh Iyer and Stephen Devassy. Indian rock bands like Parikrama and others also performed.

Bollywood Playback singer, KK performed live on 23 February at Spring Spree. Spree 2013 saw performances by Suraj Jagan, Suchitra, Gino Banks, Baiju Dharmajan and also saw the presence of Sobhita Dhulipala who judged Allure. Spring Spree has also had the British band Xerath perform in 2012 along with Vijay Prakash.

== Workshops ==
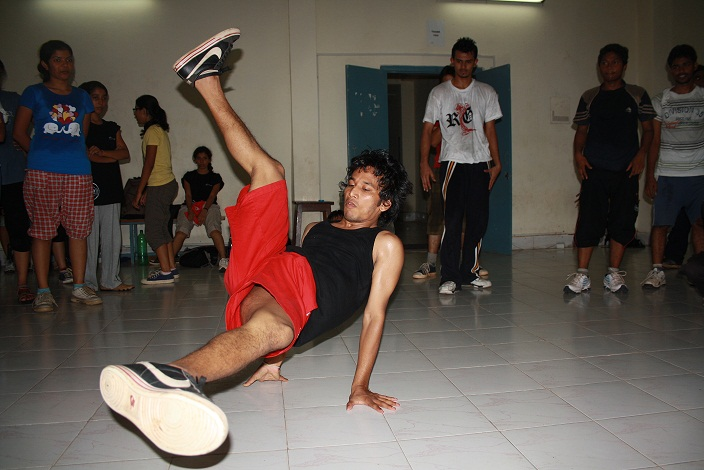
Bboying Workshop at Spring Spree 2011

Workshops are conducted in every possible field related to culture. The workshops range from acting, graffiti, painting, sketching, movie making, creative writing etc. Each workshop has a fee and is taught by a recognized professional in the field. In the 2011 edition the Graffiti workshop was taught by the famous German graffiti artist Loomit. In 2014 the workshops conducted were Guitar Workshop by Baiju Dharmajan (popularly known as the God of Small Strings), Animagic Workshop- 3D Animation Workshop, Cyber Forensics and Ethical Hacking Workshop, DSLR Workshop by Nikon, Rubik's Cube Workshop and Cartooning Workshop.

== Sponsors and past associates ==
Various corporations have sponsored Spring Spree including Murugappa Group. Airtel, Nestlé (in 2010), Nokia, Pepsi, Polo Ralph Lauren (in 2010), The Raymond Shop, State Bank of Hyderabad, TVS Motor (in 2009), Virgin Mobile (in 2009), Vodafone (in 2010) and Wipro (in 2010) to name a few. Sponsors from the media sector include several brands such as The Hindu, TV9, Red FM, and Maa Music.. The sponsors for Spree 2015 are Coke Studio, Eyetex Dazzler, Orient Cement, Campus France, Princeton Review, Amity Business School, British Council, ITM, Panache, Inspire, Tech Bharat, Ferris Wheel, Shankar Mahadevan Academy, Swarnabhoomi, Saavn, Faadoo Engineers, FestSamachar, knowafest, Campus Diaries, Free Charge, Electronics For You, Glow Job TV, UGCC, LIC, NITWAA, TTL, Kaps and Gift Xoxo.

== Records, Artists and Celebrities ==
Kadam, Footprint painting world record 10,592sq.ft

Spring Spree 2010 saw a performance by prominent Kuchipudi dancer Shobha Naidu. In the 25th edition film director Sekhar kammula graced the occasion exhorting the students to dream and work to realize them. Concerts of Naresh Iyer, Stephen Devassy and Pakistani sensational band Noori made each day of 25th edition of Spring Spree end with a bang Spring Spree 2011 saw the setting of a world record for the largest footprint painting. Spring Spree 2012 was graced by Xerath, Paradigm shift, Vijay Prakash, Ali (actor) and Siva Reddy and Mahima Sandoval. Spring Spree 2013 was dazzled by the performance of one of the India'S greatest playback singer krishnakumar kunath or KK.TIA KAR one of the Top10 Indian idol finalists also graced the occasion. Spree 2013 was inaugurated by R. P. Patnaik. 2014 saw the performances of Suchitra and Suraj Jagan taking Spree to new heights. Sobhita Dhulipala presided over the inaugural with Anoop Rubens and also judged Allure. Tarun Raj evaluated the director's cut event. iRA saw Gino Banks performing. Also performing were Baiju Dharmajan and Sunburn Campus.

== Social activities ==
Spring Spree 2011 saw the setting of a world record for the largest footprint painting.
