= II (Xerath album) =

Studio album by Xerath
- Released: 3 May 2011
- Recorded: 2010
- Studio: Hansen Studios, England, United Kingdom
- Genre: Progressive metal, symphonic metal, djent, extreme metal
- Length: 56:10
- Label: Candlelight Records

Xerath chronology
I (2009)	II (2011)	III (2014)

Professional ratings
Review scores
Source	Rating
AllMusic	3/5
Metal Assault	9.5/10
Metal Underground	3.5/5
Ultimate Guitar	8.7/10

II is the second studio album by English metal band Xerath, released on 3 May 2011 through Candlelight Records. It was mixed and mastered by Jacob Hansen at Hansen Studios. Drum recording and tracking was done by Chris Fielding at Foel Studios. As with the first album, the artwork was by done Colin Marks of Rainsong Design.

== Track listing ==
No.	Title	Length
1.	"Unite to Defy"	5:24
2.	"God of the Frontlines"	4:38
3.	"Reform Part III"	4:37
4.	"The Call to Arms"	5:52
5.	"Machine Insurgency"	4:56
6.	"Sworn to Sacrifice"	4:44
7.	"Enemy Incited Armageddon"	7:25
8.	"Nuclear Self Eradication"	5:29
9.	"Numbered Among the Dead"	4:36
10.	"The Glorious Death": I. "Divine Rapture"; II. "A New Awakening""	8:35
