= Arsis =

American metal band

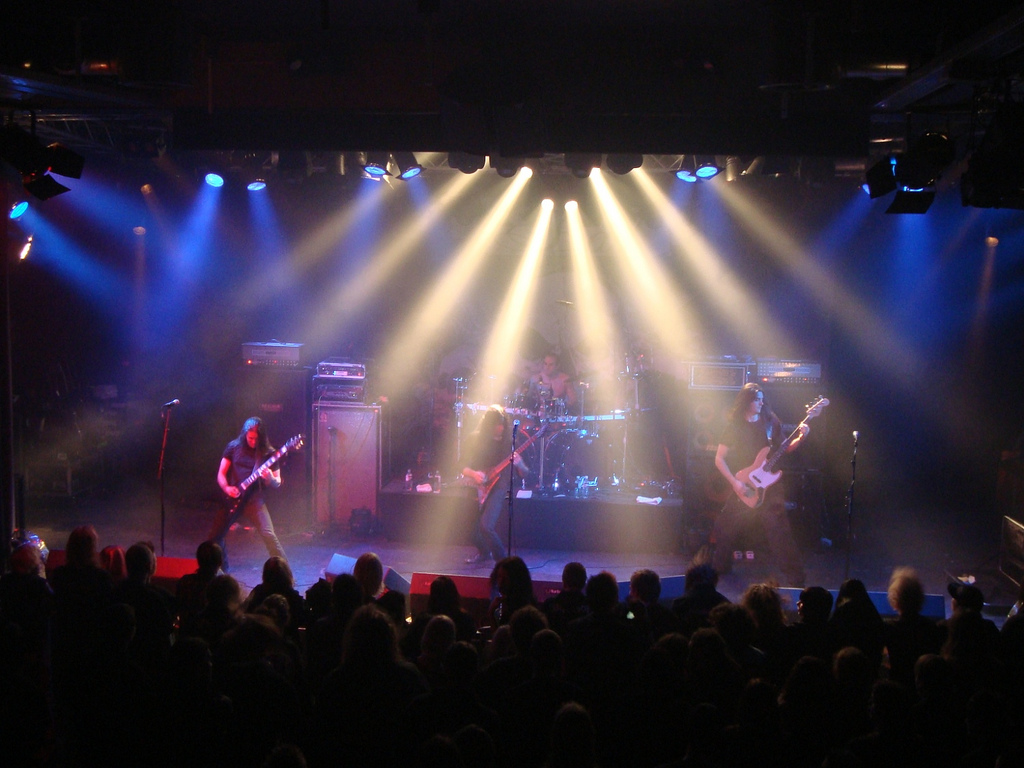
- Arsis in 2010. Performing live in Denmark with founding members James Malone and Mike Van Dyne

Background information
- Origin: Virginia Beach, Virginia, U.S.
- Genres: Technical death metal, melodic death metal, blackened death metal
- Years active: 2000–present
- Labels: Willowtip, Earache, Candlelight, Nuclear Blast, Negative Existence, Agonia
- Members: James Malone; Shawn Priest; Noah Martin
- Past members: Mike Van Dyne; Ryan Knight; Darren Cesca; Nathaniel Carter; Nick Cordle; Justin Shaw; Brandon Ellis

Arsis is an American death metal band from Virginia Beach, Virginia, formed in 2000. The band is currently signed to Nuclear Blast.

== History ==
=== Demos and Willowtip era (2000–2006) ===
James Malone and Michael "Mike" Van Dyne started Arsis in 2000. They met at the Berklee College of Music in Boston. The name Arsis comes from the musical term arsis and thesis meaning "up and down beats." They recorded two demos independently in 2001 and 2002, which Negative-Existence Records officially released in 2007. Arsis signed to Willowtip Records in 2003 and released their debut album, A Celebration of Guilt, in 2004, which ranked #50 on Decibel Magazine's "Top 100 Death Metal Albums of All Time" list. A Diamond for Disease in 2005 and United in Regret in 2006 followed. During this time, Arsis toured heavily, sharing national stages with Six Feet Under, Full Blown Chaos, Misery Index, Mortician, Incantation, The Chasm, Necrophagist, Cattle Decapitation, Neuraxis, Alarum, Job for a Cowboy, Animosity, Ion Dissonance, Dead to Fall, Misery Signals, The Faceless, All Shall Perish, Napalm Death, and A Life Once Lost, and performed on the main stage at the 2004 Maryland Deathfest, the 2006 New England Metal and Hardcore Festival, and the First Annual California Metalfest.

The band's main composer, singer/guitarist/songwriter James Malone, wrote and performed all the guitar, vocal, and bass work on the first studio album, A Celebration of Guilt, as well as the follow-up, A Diamond for Disease. Malone composed and performed a score for the off-Broadway ballet company Ballet Deviare. He has a signature model for Washburn Guitars.

Mike Van Dyne performed drums on all of Arsis' releases and tours up until early 2007, and recorded/toured again with the band from 2009 until 2011. Van Dyne recorded and performed live with The Final Sleep and Fleshspoil.

=== We Are the Nightmare and lineup changes (2007–2008) ===
The band signed to Nuclear Blast before original drummer Van Dyne left to pursue a degree in medicine. Darren Cesca replaced him. Noah Martin, who played bass on United in Regret, and Ryan Knight were added to the lineup to complete the touring cycle and record We Are the Nightmare (2008), their first album with Nuclear Blast. That summer 2008, Arsis played on the Thrash & Burn tour.

Cesca was let go in 2008, citing differences in musical direction. He was replaced on tour with Alex Tomlin of Battlemaster and later with Shawn Priest. Martin left the group in the fall of 2008 to return to college. In late 2008, Nick Cordle (guitar) and David Kinkade (drums) joined the band, and in December Knight left Arsis to join The Black Dahlia Murder.

On March 18, 2009, Malone issued a statement explaining and apologizing for recent tour cancellations and lineup changes, citing personal reasons. Soon after, it was announced that original drummer Mike Van Dyne would return (although due to career commitments, his ability to tour with the band might be limited).

=== Starve for the Devil (2009–2011) ===
In July 2009, it was announced that work was ongoing for their next record, Starve for the Devil. In September, recording sessions began with bassist Nathaniel Carter and producer Zeuss. The record was released on February 9, 2010, and reached No. 13 on the Billboard Top New Artist Albums (Heatseekers) chart, making Starve for the Devil the highest-charting Arsis album.

In October and November 2009, Arsis toured Europe with Behemoth, DevilDriver, and Scar Symmetry on the Neckbreakers Ball Tour.

In January 2010, Arsis released a music video for "Forced to Rock", the first track off Starve for the Devil.

In January and February 2010, Arsis toured the U.S. and Canada with Arch Enemy, Exodus, and Mutiny Within on the Tyrants of Evil North American Tour.

On March 6, 2010, Arsis performed at the Eye Scream Metal Fest II in Mexico City (the band's first ever performance in Latin America) with Sacred Reich, Cynic, Municipal Waste, and Dying Fetus. This festival, the Tyrants of Evil Tour, and the Neckbreakers Ball Tour are the only times the full Starve for the Devil recording lineup performed live.

On May 13, 2010, Noah Martin rejoined the band despite staying enrolled in college, following Nathaniel Carter's departure.

In November 2010, Malone, Cordle, Martin, and Van Dyne toured Europe extensively with Misery Index, Grave, The Last Felony, and The Rotted, followed by a U.S. headlining tour in December with Powerglove and Conducting from the Grave. During their headlining dates, Arsis performed the 12+ minute track "A Diamond for Disease" in its entirety for the first time ever.

On August 9, 2011, Willowtip Records reissued Arsis' debut album A Celebration of Guilt with two bonus tracks and expanded artwork.

=== Unwelcome (2011–2017) ===
News of demos and samples of a new full-length record starting pouring out in early 2012. Not long after, Cordle left the band to join Arch Enemy. Shortly after, drummer and founding member Mike Van Dyne departed Arsis to concentrate on his career full-time.

On March 13, 2012, Arsis released a demo song titled "Choking on Sand" featuring Malone on vocals and both guitars and Noah Martin on bass.

On April 6, Arsis announced Shawn Priest as Mike Van Dyne's replacement and reposted the demo song "Choking on Sand" featuring Priest.

Tracking for the then-untitled full-length record produced by Mark Lewis began on June 4. The band posted raw footage from the recording sessions on Facebook on July 19.

On July 27, 2012, the album art and title for Unwelcome were revealed.

On December 4, 2012, Arsis released an EP titled Lepers Caress preceding the release of Unwelcome with new songs that would be on the full-length record as well as some re-recordings from their earlier catalog.

On April 30, 2013, Arsis released Unwelcome.

In 2014, Willowtip Records reissued Arsis' A Diamond for Disease EP and United in Regret album with bonus live video tracks and expanded artwork.

In 2015, Arsis supported Sepultura on their 30th Anniversary tour, joined by Destruction and Starkill.

In 2016, Arsis released their pre-production demo titled "As Deep As Your Flesh". They opened up for Scar Symmetry on their North American tour with Shattered Sun and Painted in Exile.

=== Visitant (2018–present) ===
In November 2018, Arsis released Visitant.

== Band members ==
Current

- James Malone – lead vocals, rhythm guitar (2000–present), lead guitar (2000–2006, 2018–present), bass (2000–2006)
- Noah Martin – bass, backing vocals (2006–2008, 2010–present)
- Shawn Priest – drums (2008, 2012–present)

Former

- Mike Van Dyne – drums (2000–2007, 2009–2011)
- Nathaniel Carter – bass (2009–2010)
- Brandon Ellis – lead guitar (2012–2018)
- Nick Cordle – lead guitar (2008–2012)
- Ryan Knight – lead guitar (2006–2008)
- Darren Cesca – drums (2007–2008)

Touring/Session

- Mike Parks – lead vocals (2007, 2012)
- Justin Shaw – bass (2004–2006)
- Mike Mullen – bass (2003)
- Alex Cox – bass (2006)
- Michael Leon – bass (2015)
- Taylor Washington – lead guitar (2018–2019)
- "Fast" Chris Jones – lead guitar (2003–2004)
- Jake Ososkie – lead guitar (2004–2005)
- Johnny Allen – lead guitar (2006)
- Jon Fralick – lead guitar (2006)
- David Kinkade – drums (2008–2009)
- Alex Tomlin – drums (2008)
- Samus – drums (70000 Tons of Metal 2011)
- Scot Seguine – bass (2001 demo)
- Kathy Burke – lead guitar (2001 demo)

== Discography ==
Studio albums

- A Celebration of Guilt (2004)
- United in Regret (2006)
- We Are the Nightmare (2008)
- Starve for the Devil (2010)
- Unwelcome (2013)
- Visitant (2018)

EPs and compilations

- A Diamond for Disease (2005)
- As Regret Becomes Guilt: The Demos of Arsis (2007)
- Lepers Caress (2012)

Music videos

- We Are the Nightmare – Regular Version (2008)
- We Are the Nightmare – Animated Version (2008)
- Forced to Rock (2010)
- Carve My Cross (2012)
- Scornstar (2013)
- Tricking the Gods (2018)
- Fathoms (2018)
