= Mark Riddick =

American illustrator and graphic artist

Mark Riddick is an American illustrator and graphic artist, specializing in posters and other graphics for death metal and black metal music.

Riddick was born in Bossier City, Louisiana in 1976 and raised in Northern Virginia. He holds a BA degree in Studio Art from Greensboro College, North Carolina. His work has been published by underground bands and fanzines, and by recording acts on metal record labels.

He also contributed art to the heavy metal cartoon Metalocalypse. In 2016, he worked on merchandise for Justin Bieber and designed a collection for The Hundreds.

== Bands and clients ==
- Arch Enemy
- Arsis
- Autopsy
- Dethklok
- Devourment
- Dying Fetus
- Exodus
- Morbid Angel
- Necro (rapper)
- Suffocation
- Suicide Silence
- The Black Dahlia Murder

== Books ==
- Killustration (2006)
- Rotten Renderings (2008)
- Logos From Hell (2008)
- Compendium of Death (2012)
- Logos from Hell 2
- The Art of Riddick
- Morbid Visions

== Cover art ==
- Arsis – United in Regret
- Arsis – Starve for the Devil
- Cephalic Carnage – Halls of Amenti
- Doomstone – Those Whom Satan Hath Joined
- Embrionic Death Regurgitated Stream of Rot
- Gravehill Rites of the Pentagram
- Kryptos – The Coils of Apollyon
- The Ravenous – Assembled In Blasphemy
- Ruins – Chambers of Perversion
- Witch-hunt – Prophecies of a Great Plague
- Strike Master – Majestic Strike
- Yskelgroth – Unholy Primitive Nihilism
- Gutslit - "Skewered in the sewer"
- Scythelord - Toxic Minds
- Rune - The End of Nothing
