= Dååth =

American heavy metal band

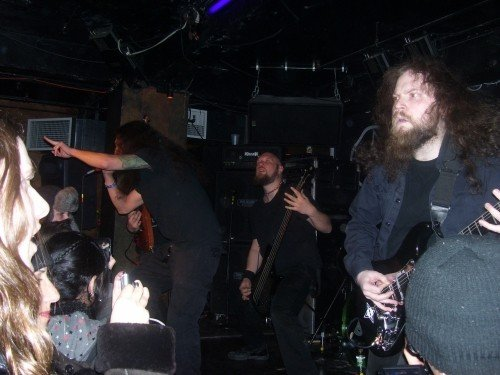
- Dååth performing in 2009

Background information
- Also known as: Dirt Nap (2000–2004)
- Origin: Atlanta, Georgia, U.S.
- Genres: Groove metal, progressive death metal
- Years active: 2000–present
- Labels: Roadrunner, Metal Blade, Century Media
- Members: Sean Zatorsky; Eyal Levi; Kerim Lechner; Jesse Zuretti; Rafael Trujillo; David Marvuglio
- Past members: Emil Werstler; Sean Farber; Jeremy Creamer; Mike Kameron; Matthew Ellis; Kevin Talley
- Website: http://daathofficial.com

Dååth /ˈdɔːθ/ is an American death metal band from Atlanta. They incorporate death metal, orchestral music, and progressive metal.

== History ==
Eyal Levi and Mike Kameron started Dååth. They had been playing in bands since middle school. The two attended Berklee College of Music in Boston but dropped out to concentrate full-time on making music. The band was known as Dirt Nap before the name change in 2004.

Dååth's first album, Futility, was self-released in 2004. Their Roadrunner Records debut, The Hinderers, was released in March 2007. Dååth have so far released two music videos from The Hinderers, the first being "Festival Mass Soulform", which was created before getting signed and helped them gain Roadrunner's interest. The second video, "Subterfuge", was released in February 2007.

In March 2007, Dååth was confirmed to play the second stage (rotating slots) at Ozzfest. On October 22, 2007, Blabbermouth.net reported that live singer Sean Farber had left the band. On February 28, 2008, Blabbermouth reported that Sean Z. (who had filled in after Sean Farber had left) had been named the new singer.

2007 consisted of more notable tours for Dååth. In January, they toured the US with Job For a Cowboy, The Acacia Strain, and Psyopus. In the spring, there was a European run with Unearth and Job for a Cowboy. That summer featured Ozzfest, Summer Slaughter dates, a Dying Fetus tour, and various Devildriver off-dates. Later on that year, they toured the US and Canada with Dark Funeral and Naglfar. To end the album cycle, Dååth performed three shows in Japan with Zyklon.

The band's third album, The Concealers, was released on April 21, 2009, by Century Media Records via a partnership with Roadrunner Records. Dååth released one music video from The Concealers, for the song "Day of Endless Light". They toured behind The Concealers as well. Spring of 2009 featured a full US tour with Dragonforce and Cynic. Summer was the full US and Canada with Goatwhore and Abigail Williams. Later that year, Dååth returned to Europe with Chimaira, Unearth, and Throwdown.

During the break between the final tour for The Concealers album cycle and the writing sessions for the upcoming Dååth album, guitarists Eyal Levi, and Emil Werstler released Avalanche of Worms, an instrumental CD on April 20, 2010, via Magna Carta Records under the artist name Levi/Werstler. Sean Reinert from Cynic played drums on it.

Dååth released their self-titled fourth studio album in October 2010 via Century Media Records.

In 2011, Emil Werstler filled the vacant bass and Sean Zatorsky the vacant keyboard and vocal duties for Chimaira. In 2012, Werstler was officially made the lead guitarist for Chimaira as well as Jeremy Creamer filling bass duties in Chimaira left vacant by Werstler's promotion.

In May 2022, vocalist Sean Zatorsky revealed the band was recording new material and was hoping to release a new EP later in the year or in early 2023. He also revealed that bassist Jeremy Creamer and guitarist Emil Werstler might perform on the upcoming EP "if they have time", and that drummer Kevin Talley was no longer a member of the band, but they have recruited a new drummer who will perform on the new EP. On August 2, the band revealed that Septicflesh drummer Kerim Lechner would perform drums on the upcoming EP. On August 6, guitarist Emil Werstler confirmed he was no longer a member of the band.

On February 22, 2023, the band announced they had signed to Metal Blade Records and released their first new song in 12 years, "No Rest No End". They also revealed new band members Jesse Zuretti, who would handle orchestration, synth, and guitars, and Dave Marvuglio, acting as session bassist for the band, confirming Jeremy Creamer is no longer in the band. On September 12, Dååth announced their new lead guitarist: Rafael Trujillo from Austria.

On March 19, 2024, the band released a music video for the song "Hex Unending" and announced their fifth album, The Deceivers, which was released on May 3.

== Members ==
Current members

- Eyal Levi – guitar, synth, production (1999–present)
- Sean Zatorsky – vocals (2008–present)
- Kerim "Krimh" Lechner – drums (2022–present)
- Jesse Zuretti – synth, orchestration, guitar (2022–present)
- Rafael Trujillo – guitar (2023–present)
- David Marvuglio – bass (2023–present)

Former members

- Mike Kameron – keyboard, vocals (2000–2008)
- Jeremy Creamer – bass (2004–2010)
- Emil Werstler – guitar (2004–2010)
- Kris Dale – bass guitar (2004)
- Eric Sanders – drums (2004)
- Sam Cuadra – guitar (2004)
- Corey Brewer – drums (2004)
- Lance Hoskins – bass guitar (2004)
- Matthew Ellis – drums (2004–2005)
- Kevin Talley – drums (2006–2010)
- Sean Farber – vocals (2006–2007)

== Discography ==
=== Studio albums ===
- Futility (2004)
- The Hinderers (2007)
- The Concealers (2009)
- Dååth (2010)
- The Deceivers (2024)

=== Extended plays ===
- Dead on the Dance Floor (2007)

=== Videography ===
- "Festival Mass Soulform" – released January 25, 2007
- "Subterfuge" – released February 28, 2007
- "Day of Endless Light" – released July 3, 2009
- "Hex Unending" – released March 19, 2024
- "Ascension" – released April 9, 2024
