= All That Remains discography =

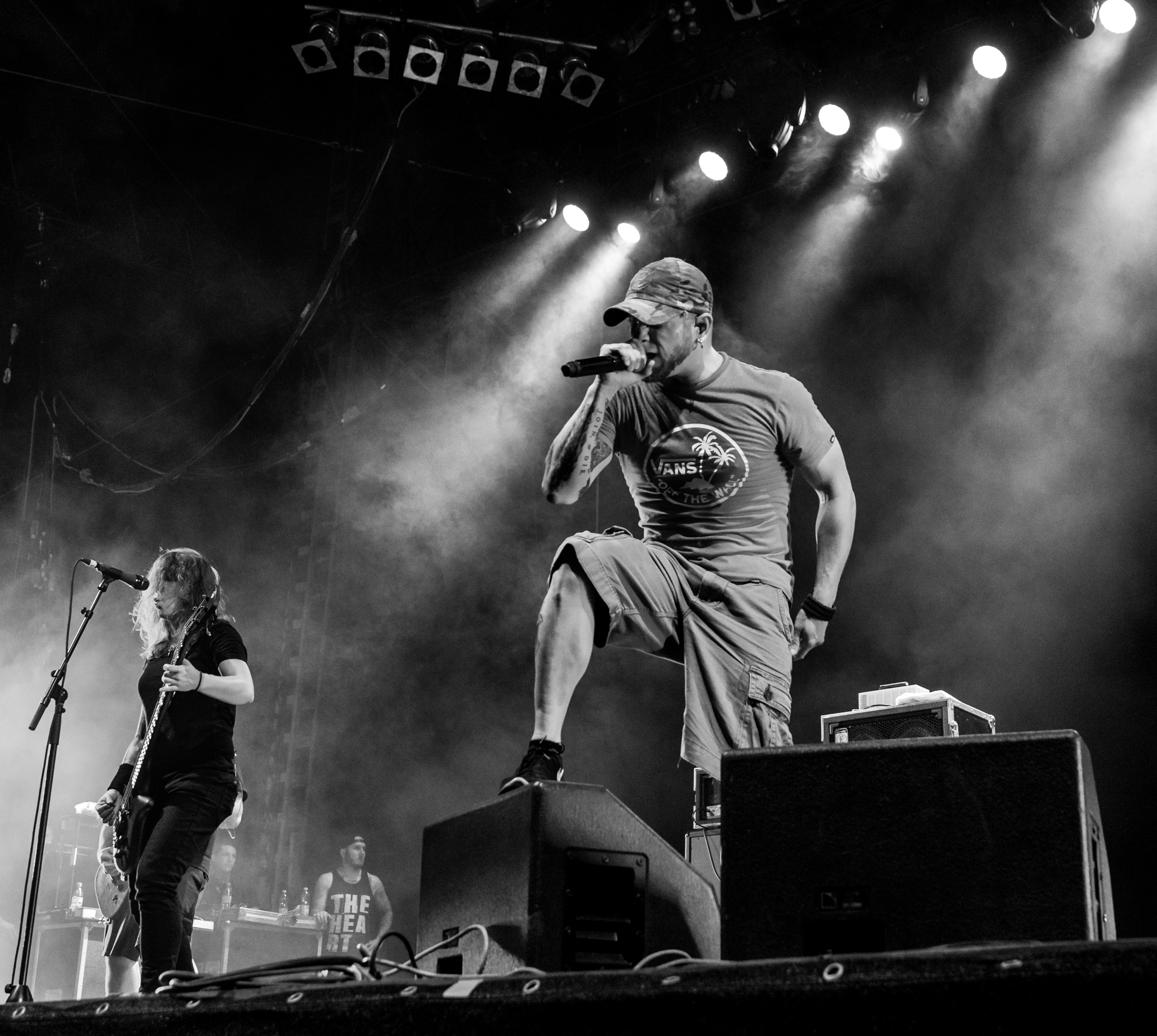
- All That Remains performing in 2015
- Studio albums: 10
- Live albums: 1
- Singles: 14
- Music videos: 13
- Demo: 1

All That Remains are an American heavy metal band from Springfield, Massachusetts, formed in 1998. They have released ten studio albums, a live CD/DVD, and have over a million records worldwide. Formed in 1998 the band signed with Prosthetic records and released their debut album Behind Silence and Solitude in 2002. Two years later they released their sophomore albums This Darkened Heart. They then signed with Razor and Tie Records to release their 2006 album Fall of Ideals which was their first album to reach the U.S. Billboard 200 peaking at number 75. The following year in 2007 they released their only live album All That Remains Live.

Their 4th album Overcome was released in 2008 and peaked at number 16 on the U.S. Billboard 200, selling just under 29,000 copies in the United States in its first week. It was also their first album to crack the Billboard Canadian Albums peaking at 15. There 2010 album For We Are Many sold 29,000 copies in its first week and peaked at number 10 on the U.S Billboard 200 and peaked at number 7 on the Billboard Canadian Albums, both being the highest the band has ever charted in both countries. Along with this it was their first album to top the Hard Rock Albums Billboard peaking at number 1, also being their highest-charting album on the U.S Top Rock Albums Billboard peaking at number 2. In 2012 the band released their 6th album A War You Can Not Win which peaked at number 13 on the U.S. Billboard 200, selling 25,000 copies in its first week, the single “Stand Up” reached number one on the U.S. Mainstream Rock chart. Their 7th album The Order of Things was released in 2015 and peaked at number 25 on the U.S. Billboard 200 and sold about 19,000 copies in its first week.

Their 8th studio album Madness sold 10,000 copies in its first week and peaked at number 50 on the U.S. Billboard 200. The album also topped the charts on the Top Hard Rock Albums Billboard. A year later the band released their 9th studio album titled Victim of the New Disease which peaked at number 154 on the U.S Billboard 200 selling 5,000 copies in its first week. In 2025 after a 7-year hiatus the band released their 10th studio album Antifragile via an independent record label.

== Albums ==
=== Studio albums ===
Year	Album details	Peak chart positions								Sales
Year	Album details	US	US Rock	US Hard Rock	AUS	CAN	JPN	UK	UK Rock	Sales
2002	Behind Silence and Solitude: Released: March 26, 2002; Label: Prosthetic; Formats: CD, DL	—	—	—	—	—	—	—	—	
2004	This Darkened Heart: Released: March 23, 2004; Label: Prosthetic; Formats: CD, LP, DL	—	—	—	—	—	—	—	—	
2006	The Fall of Ideals: Released: July 11, 2006; Label: Prosthetic, Razor & Tie; Formats: CD, LP, DL	75	—	—	—	—	194	—	28	Worldwide: 450,000+
2008	Overcome: Released: September 16, 2008; Label: Prosthetic, Razor & Tie; Formats: CD, LP, DL	16	5	5	—	15	82	174	17	Worldwide: 500,000 copies.
2010	For We Are Many: Released: October 12, 2010; Label: Prosthetic, Razor & Tie; Formats: CD, LP, DL	10	2	1	90	7	91	—	27	Worldwide: 70,000+
2012	A War You Cannot Win: Released: November 6, 2012; Label: Razor & Tie; Formats: CD, LP, DL	13	4	2	—	12	84	—	—	US: 123,000+
2015	The Order of Things: Released: February 24, 2015; Label: Razor & Tie; Formats: CD, LP, DL	25	5	3	72	17	150	—	31	
2017	Madness: Released: April 28, 2017; Label: Razor & Tie; Formats: CD, LP, DL	50	9	1	—	77	—	—	—	
2018	Victim of the New Disease: Released: November 9, 2018; Label: Razor & Tie; Formats: CD, LP, DL	154	28	8	— (Note: Victim of the New Disease did not chart on the Australian ARIA Albums Chart, but peaked at number 47 on the ARIA Digital Albums Chart.)	—	—	—	—	
2025	Antifragile: Released: January 31, 2025; Label: Independent; Formats: CD, LP, DL	—	—	—	—	—	—	— (Note: Antifragile did not chart on the UK Albums Chart, but peaked at number 95 on the UK Album Downloads Chart.)	—	
"—" denotes a release that did not chart.

=== Live albums ===
Year	Album details
2007	All That Remains: Live: Released: October 30, 2007; Format: DVD Video; Label: Prosthetic Records

=== Demos ===
Year	Album details
1999	Demo 1999: Released: 1999; Format: CD; Label: Auto-Production

== Singles ==
=== 2000s ===
Year	Title	Peak chart positions			Certifications	Album
Year	Title	US Alt.	US Main.	US Rock	Certifications	Album
2004	"This Darkened Heart"	—	—	—		This Darkened Heart
2004	"Tattered on My Sleeve"	—	—	—		This Darkened Heart
2005	"The Deepest Gray"	—	—	—		This Darkened Heart
2006	"This Calling"	—	—	—		The Fall of Ideals
2006	"The Air That I Breathe"	—	—	—		The Fall of Ideals
2006	"Not Alone"	—	—	—		The Fall of Ideals
2008	"Chiron"	—	—	—		Overcome
2008	"Two Weeks"	38	9	41	RIAA: Platinum	Overcome
2009	"Forever in Your Hands"	—	15	33		Overcome
"—" denotes a release that did not chart.

=== 2010s ===
Year	Title	Peak chart positions			Certifications	Album
Year	Title	US Hard Rock Digital	US Main.	US Rock	Certifications	Album
2010	"Hold On"	—	10	27		For We Are Many
2011	"The Last Time"	—	8	25		For We Are Many
2011	"The Waiting One"	—	7	27		For We Are Many
2012	"Stand Up"	17	1	—		A War You Cannot Win
2013	"Asking Too Much"	—	14	—		A War You Cannot Win
2013	"What If I Was Nothing"	19	2	35	RIAA: Gold	A War You Cannot Win
2014	"No Knock"	—	—	—		The Order of Things
2015	"This Probably Won't End Well"	—	11	—		The Order of Things
2015	"For You"	—	15	—		The Order of Things
2015	"Victory Lap"	—	22	—		The Order of Things
2017	"Madness"	15	11	—		Madness
2017	"Safe House"	—	—	—		Madness
2017	"The Thunder Rolls"	2	23	26	RIAA: Gold	Madness
2018	"Fuck Love"	—	—	—		Victim of the New Disease
2018	"Wasteland"	—	—	—		Victim of the New Disease
2018	"Everything's Wrong"	—	25	—		Victim of the New Disease
"—" denotes a release that did not chart.

=== 2020s ===
Year	Title	Peak chart positions		Album
Year	Title	US Hard Rock Digital	US Hot Hard Rock	Album
2024	"Divine"	2	17	Antifragile
2024	"Let You Go"	6	—	Antifragile
2024	"No Tomorrow"	—	—	Antifragile
2024	"Forever Cold"	—	—	Antifragile
"—" denotes a release that did not chart.

=== As featured artist ===
Year	Title	Album
2024	"Proof" (RVSHVD featuring All That Remains)	Non-album single

=== Promotional singles ===
Year	Title	Album
2009	"Frozen"	Overcome (Japanese bonus track)
2012	"Down Through the Ages"	A War You Cannot Win
2012	"You Can't Fill My Shadows"	A War You Cannot Win
2015	"Tru-Kvlt-Metal"	The Order of Things
2016	"Criticism and Self-Realization"	The Order of Things
2017	"Halo"	Madness
2017	"Louder"	Madness
2018	"Just Tell Me Something"	Victim of the New Disease

== Music videos ==
Year	Song	Director(s)
2004	"This Darkened Heart"	Ian McFarland
2004	"Tattered on My Sleeve"	Dale Resteghini
2005	"The Deepest Gray"	Ian McFarland/Anthony Moreschi
2006	"This Calling"	Frankie Nasso
2006	"The Air That I Breathe"	Darren Doane
2007	"Not Alone"	Soren Kragh-Jacobsen
2008	"Chiron"	Brian Thompson
2008	"Two Weeks"	Brian Thompson
2009	"Forever In Your Hands"	David Brodsky
2010	"Hold On"	Ramon Boutviseth
2011	"The Last Time"	Nathan Cox
2012	"Stand Up"	P.R. Brown
2013	"What If I Was Nothing"	Rasa Acharya, Dan Kennedy
2015	"This Probably Won't End Well"	
2015	"For You"	Daniel Kaufman
2015	"Victory Lap"	Jon Burke
2017	"Madness"	
2017	"The Thunder Rolls"	Wombat Fire, Brooks Jones
2019	"Everything's Wrong"	
2019	"Just Tell Me Something"	
2024	"Divine"	Brian Raess
2024	"Let You Go"	Tom Flynn
2024	"No Tomorrow"	Tom Flynn
