= Victory Lap (All That Remains song) =

Single by All That Remains

from the album The Order of Things
- Released: December 8, 2015
- Recorded: 2014
- Genre: Heavy metal
- Length: 3:53
- Label: Razor & Tie
- Songwriters: Jason Costa, Oli Herbert, Philip Labonte, Mike Martin, Josh Wilbur
- Producer: Josh Wilbur

All That Remains singles chronology
| "For You" (2015) | "Victory Lap" (2015) | "Madness" (2017) |

"Victory Lap" is a single by American heavy metal band All That Remains from their seventh album, The Order of Things. It was originally released as a part of the album on February 24, 2015, however it was later released as a single on December 8, 2015. The song reached number 22 on the US Mainstream Rock chart.

== Composition ==
In a 2017 article for Guitar World, guitarist Oli Herbert talked about the process of writing the solo, stating:

When composing this solo, I considered the elements that already exist in the composition, such as the various themes and variations that are built into it, and the rhythmic interplay between each of the licks as the solo progresses. The “direction of the line” is my guiding concept.

== Music video ==
The songs music video shows the life of All That Remains on tour, featuring numerous clips of the band performing onstage, a look backstage and meeting with fans. In a press release lead singer Phil Labonte stated "We wanted to do a live video because that's such a huge part of making music for us. So we hope you enjoy this little taste of All That Remains on the road."

== Reception ==
Blabbermouth wrote on the song stating it "rides a mostly straightforward, pumping rock groove despite the unabashed need to power pop its way through the choruses." Metal.de wrote that the song "picks up the pace" on the album, however they added that the "chorus sounds dreadfully formulaic." Similarly, Daniel Marsicano of Lambgoat said the song has a "fiery bursts of metal trailing through" compared to some of the more radio friendly songs on the album.

== Personnel ==
All That Remains

- Philip Labonte - lead vocals
- Oli Herbert - lead guitar
- Mike Martin - rhythm guitar
- Jeanne Sagan - bass guitar, backing vocals
- Jason Costa - drums

== Charts ==
| Chart (2015) | Peak position |
|---|---|
| US Mainstream Rock (Billboard) | 22 |
