= Tru-Kvlt-Metal =

Single by All That Remains

from the album The Order of Things
- Released: February 10, 2015
- Recorded: 2014
- Genre: Metalcore
- Length: 3:39
- Label: Razor & Tie
- Songwriters: Jason Costa, Oli Herbert, Philip Labonte, Mike Martin, Josh Wilbur
- Producer: Josh Wilbur

All That Remains singles chronology
"This Probably Won't End Well" (2015)	"Tru-Kvlt-Metal" (2015)	"For You" (2015)

"Tru-Kvlt-Metal" is the second non-official and third single song by American heavy metal band All That Remains from their seventh album, The Order of Things. It was released February 10, 2015.

== Song meaning ==
Phil Labonte stated about the song: "Tru-Kvlt-Metal" is really sarcastic. It's really directed towards the people that we've heard year after year, record after record, saying, 'Oh, put out another record like The Fall Of Ideals. We've done that, and even if we did it, some purist would say it's tarnished anyway because we've already done it. You can't win, so (the song) is kind of like flicking my nose at them and giving them the bird."

== Reception ==
AllMusic reviewer James Christopher Monger criticized the track, saying the song "goes so far as to call out those who have cast doubt on the band's authenticity, and does so amidst a barrage of alt-metal tropes that must have taken minutes to conjure."

== Track listing ==
No.	Title	Length
1.	"Tru-Kvlt-Metal"	3:39

== Personnel ==
All That Remains

- Philip Labonte - lead vocals
- Oli Herbert - lead guitar
- Mike Martin - rhythm guitar
- Jeanne Sagan - bass guitar, backing vocals
- Jason Costa - drums

Additional

- Josh Wilbur - Production
- TBA - Mixing
- TBA - Mastering
- TBA - Artwork
