= This Probably Won't End Well =

Single by All That Remains

from the album The Order of Things
- Released: January 13, 2015
- Recorded: 2014
- Genre: Heavy metal
- Length: 3:48
- Label: Razor & Tie
- Songwriters: Jason Costa, Oli Herbert, Philip Labonte, Mike Martin, Josh Wilbur
- Producer: Josh Wilbur

All That Remains singles chronology
"No Knock" (2014)	"This Probably Won't End Well" (2015)	"Tru-Kvlt-Metal" (2015)

"This Probably Won't End Well" is the first official single song by American heavy metal band All That Remains from their seventh album, The Order of Things. It was released January 13, 2015.

== Song ==
Phil Labonte stated about the song: "The song's like, you know, it's kind of more of a rock song. That wasn't what we initially thought was gonna be the first single, you know, when we were writing. I mean, the song came together and we were like, 'You know, this one's really cool,' and then the label came in and were like, 'We want to put this one out first,' and we were like, 'Really?' And they were like, 'Yeah,' and we were like, 'Okay, it's cool with us, you know, it's not a… We're proud of the whole record."

== Music video ==
The band released the song’s official music video of February 3, 2015, the video sees the band performing in the ruins of a burned house. The video shows a wedding photo going up in flames and an along with a lone wedding ring perched upon a table as flames grow behind it.

== Track listing ==
No.	Title	Length
1.	"This Probably Won't End Well" (Radio Version)	3:05
2.	"This Probably Won't End Well" (Album Edit with Double Bass Kick Drum)	3:05
3.	"This Probably Won't End Well" (Album Version)	3:48

== Personnel ==
All That Remains

- Philip Labonte - lead vocals
- Oli Herbert - lead guitar
- Mike Martin - rhythm guitar
- Jeanne Sagan - bass guitar, backing vocals
- Jason Costa - drums

Additional

- Josh Wilbur - Production
- TBA - Mixing
- TBA - Mastering
- TBA - Artwork

== Charts ==
Chart (2015)	Peak position
US Rock & Alternative Airplay (Billboard)	39
US Mainstream Rock (Billboard)	11
