= Madness (All That Remains song) =

Single by All That Remains

from the album Madness
- Released: February 2, 2017
- Genre: Melodic metalcore
- Length: 3:33
- Label: Razor & Tie
- Songwriters: Philip Labonte, Oli Herbert, Mike Martin, Jason Costa, Aaron Patrick
- Producer: Howard Benson

All That Remains singles chronology
"Victory Lap" (2015)	"Madness" (2017)	"Fuck Love" (2018)

"Madness" is a song by American heavy metal band All That Remains. It is the title track of their eighth studio album Madness and was released alongside "Safe House" as the album’s first two singles. The song reached number 11 on the US Mainstream Rock Chart.

== Background ==
While talking to Sirius XM's Jose Mangin Labonte commented on the song’s meaning stating:

People tend to kind of get into kind of ruts in their lives or into patterns, and they keep doing the same thing over and over, even though it doesn’t produce the results they’re hoping for,” he told Mangin. “You can see a lot of societal cycles where nations just keep doing the same kind of stuff over, and it doesn’t always have great results. But still, it seems like a good idea. So, that’s kind of the idea is like human beings, whether you’re talking about individuals or large groups, they get into these kinds of cycles of repetitive things that can be really destructive, and so that’s kind of what I’m thinking, that’s what ‘madness’ is.”

== Reception ==
Loudwire stated that the song "focuses on strong vocal melodies with a powerful radio arrangement, playing with a soft verse and soaring chorus utilizing clean singing throughout the song."

Anna Chase of Metal Temple wrote "The song opens with a slightly Industrial/Nu-Metal sounding bass riff before diving into isolated, clean vocals and a melodic chorus filled with passion and power. While this song takes the band in a new musical direction, it still brings the familiar heaviness their fans love while experimenting with electronics and distortion."

== Music video ==
On March 1, 2017, an official lyric video for the song was released. The songs official music video was later released on April 27. The video shines a light on military members who suffer from PTSD. The video alternates between two perspectives: one shows All That Remains performing the song in the White House’s Oval Office, with rapid, disorienting cuts that heighten the sense of disorder; the other follows a soldier back home as he struggles to cope with his experiences, while showing signs of a mental breakdown.

The video also stars Benghazi veteran Kris Paronto.

== Charts ==
Chart (2025)	Peak position
US Mainstream Rock (Billboard)	11
US Hard Rock Digital Songs (Billboard)	15
