= The Air That I Breathe (disambiguation) =

"The Air That I Breathe" is a song written by Albert Hammond and Mike Hazlewood, originally recorded by Hammond in 1972.

The Air That I Breathe may also refer to:

- "The Air That I Breathe", a song by All That Remains on the album The Fall of Ideals, 2006
- The Air I Breathe, a 2007 film directed by Jieho Lee
