= Oli Herbert =

American guitarist (1974–2018)

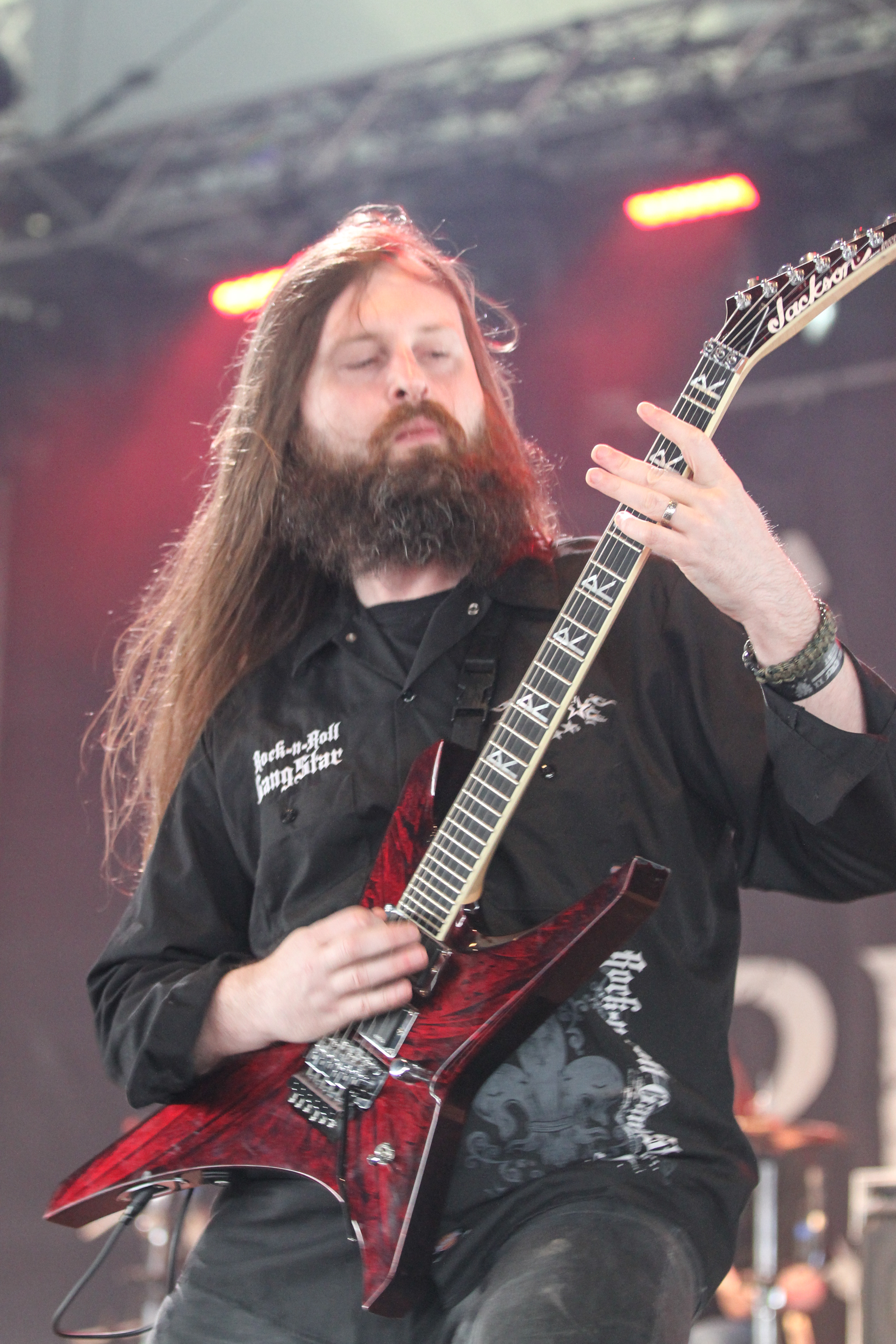
- Herbert performing with All That Remains in 2013

Background information
- Born: July 10, 1974; New London, Connecticut, US
- Origin: Longmeadow, Massachusetts, U.S.
- Died: October 16, 2018 (aged 44) Stafford Springs, Connecticut, U.S.
- Genres: Metalcore; melodic metalcore; thrash metal (early)
- Occupations: Musician, composer
- Instrument: Guitar
- Years active: 1991–2018
- Formerly of: All That Remains; Netherworld

Oliver "Oli" Herbert (July 10, 1974 — October 16, 2018) was an American guitarist and founding member of the heavy metal band All That Remains. He stayed with the band until his death in 2018.

== Biography ==
=== Early years ===
Oli Herbert began playing piano at the age of 9 and later played the trombone during his high school days.

Herbert began playing guitar at the age of 14 and later started his band with a group of friends in high school. Herbert mostly kept to himself in his early years. When commenting on his high school days, he stated, "I was just a lone metalhead. Instead of going off to parties, I'd stay on my own and practice."

On why he started playing guitar Herbert stated:

It was all about metal— Metallica, Megadeth, Slayer. Primarily, I wanted to be a rhythm guitar player because that’s what drove me to really play. I wanted to play riffs. I didn’t like solos for the first year I was playing because I thought of [Poison’s] C.C. DeVille and that high-pitched wankery. Then I remember being in a high-school cafeteria and this dude was like, “Check this out!” It was King Diamond’s “A Mansion In Darkness.” I’m listening to it and the solo comes and I was like, “Oh my God! Whoever this guy is, he’s now my favorite guitar player.

Following graduation, he attended college where he earned a degree in music composition, along with an associate's degree in Classical and Jazz Guitar.

Following his college graduation, Herbert began teaching guitar lessons. This is something he would continue doing for many years. He also began to make a name for himself in Western Massachusetts clubs as a member of the thrash metal band Netherworld.

=== All That Remains ===
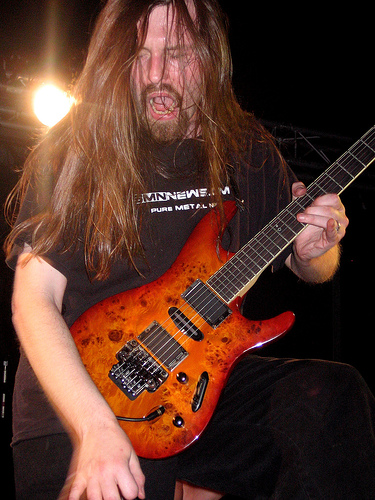
Herbert in 2006

One of Herbert's students was future All That Remains bandmate and guitarist, Mike Martin. Martin did not initially make the band, so he told the bands lead singer, Phil Labonte, to get in contact with Herbert. Herbert then auditioned for the band and Labonte, along with Dan Egan, thought he would make good addition. As of result, he the officially joined the band.

He and All That Remains then released their debut album Behind Silence and Solitude on March 26, 2002, through Prosthetic Records. This style of the album differs from their melodic metalcore musical style that they would later be known for. Following one of the band's first tours, Herbert only had $200 to his name. This led to him contemplating if he should go back to teaching or stay with the band full time. He ultimately decided to stay in the band. However, Herbert would still continue teaching while the band was on tour, either through Skype or bringing people backstage at shows.

The group then released their second album, This Darkened Heart, in 2004. This was the first release to feature Herbert's old student, Mike Martin. During a 2004 tour with GWAR Herbert’s wife quit her job and gave him an ultimatum and told Herbert that she would leave him if he did not return home immediately. Herbert initially gave into his wife’s demands however following a conversation with GWAR lead singer Dave Brockie he convinced Herbert to stay on the tour and stick with the band. The band then released their breakthrough 2006 album, The Fall of Ideals. This release is viewed as a landmark album in the metalcore genre, and was their first to reach the Billboard 200 peaking at number 75. Herbert was responsible for writing most of the album, with Labonte stating in a 2007 interview, "a lot of this record was written by Oli, who probably wrote about 70% of this record. Then he would bring it to us and we'd work the rest of it as a band." All That Remains followed this up with 2008's Overcome, which boosted the band’s popularity even further and reaching number 16 on the billboard 200. This album also featured one of the band's biggest hits, "Two Weeks", which reached number 9 on the U.S. Mainstream rock chart.

In 2009, Herbert released a metal guitar instructional program for Rockhouse, which won him instructional DVD/Book of the year. He and All That Remains released their 5th album For We Are Many in 2010, which is their highest charting album peaking a number 10 on the Billboard 200. The group followed this up with A War You Cannot Win (2012), The Order of Things (2015), and Madness (2017). Herbert's last record was their ninth studio album, Victim of the New Disease which was released shortly after his death in 2018. This added emotional weight to its reception, and his guitar parts on this album are singled out as especially strong. Herbert’s last live performance with the band came on October 6, 2018, during an All That Remains headlining show in Kuttawa, Kentucky.

In November of 2018, Jackson guitars released a very limited edition Oli Herbert Signature Rhoads model.

== Death ==
Herbert was found dead at his Stafford Springs home on October 16, 2018. This occurred shortly before the release of All That Remains ninth studio album, Victim of the New Disease. All That Remains released a statement stating, "We were devastated to learn that Oli Herbert, our friend, guitar player, and founding member of All That Remains, has passed away. Oli was an incredibly talented guitarist and song writer who defined Rock and Metal from the Northeast. His impact on the genres and our lives will continue indefinitely." In addition lead singer Phil Labonte stated, "the music world lost something significant." Tributes poured in from many other musicians. Alter Bridge guitarist Mark Tremonti called Herbert "a great talent and a great human being." Arch Enemy's Michael Amott said he was "the nicest guy" and that "the metal community has lost another great musician way too early." Many other tributes came in from artists such as Jamey Jasta and Corey Taylor.

It took a month for his cause of death to be revealed. Via a Facebook post, his wife claimed to have received the toxicology report, which indicated that the cause of his death was drowning after taking antidepressants and sleeping aids, neither of which were prescribed. However, at that time it was reported that police were looking into his death and that it was possibly the result of foul play. The Facebook post has since been deleted. In 2021, investigators noted that Herbert's will was changed a week prior to his death, which made his wife the sole benefactor. The investigation is still ongoing.

On May 26, 2021, News 8 in New Haven, Connecticut ran an in-depth story of Herbert which served as both a memorial and in depth investigation into his death.

== Gear ==
Herbert was a long time user of Jackson Guitars, with his main guitar being a 27-fret Jackson Custom Shop Warrior with Ernie Ball strings. He also prominently used a Jackson Rhoads V in nod to one of his earliest influences, Randy Rhoads. He claimed the guitar's shape was perfect and the angles were perfect for his hands. Additionally, he used an Ibanez Xiphos 27-fret guitar, Ibanez S2170, Ibanez S1625, and Takamine acoustic.

In a 2010 interview, Herbert confessed he wasn’t "really a gear guy". He stated that for his effects, he used an Maxon OD808 Overdrive, Boss NS-2 Noise Supressor, Boss DD-5 Digital Delay, and a tuner. As for his amplifier, he used a Peavey 5150 II head with Mesa/Boogie 4x12 cabs.

== Musicianship ==
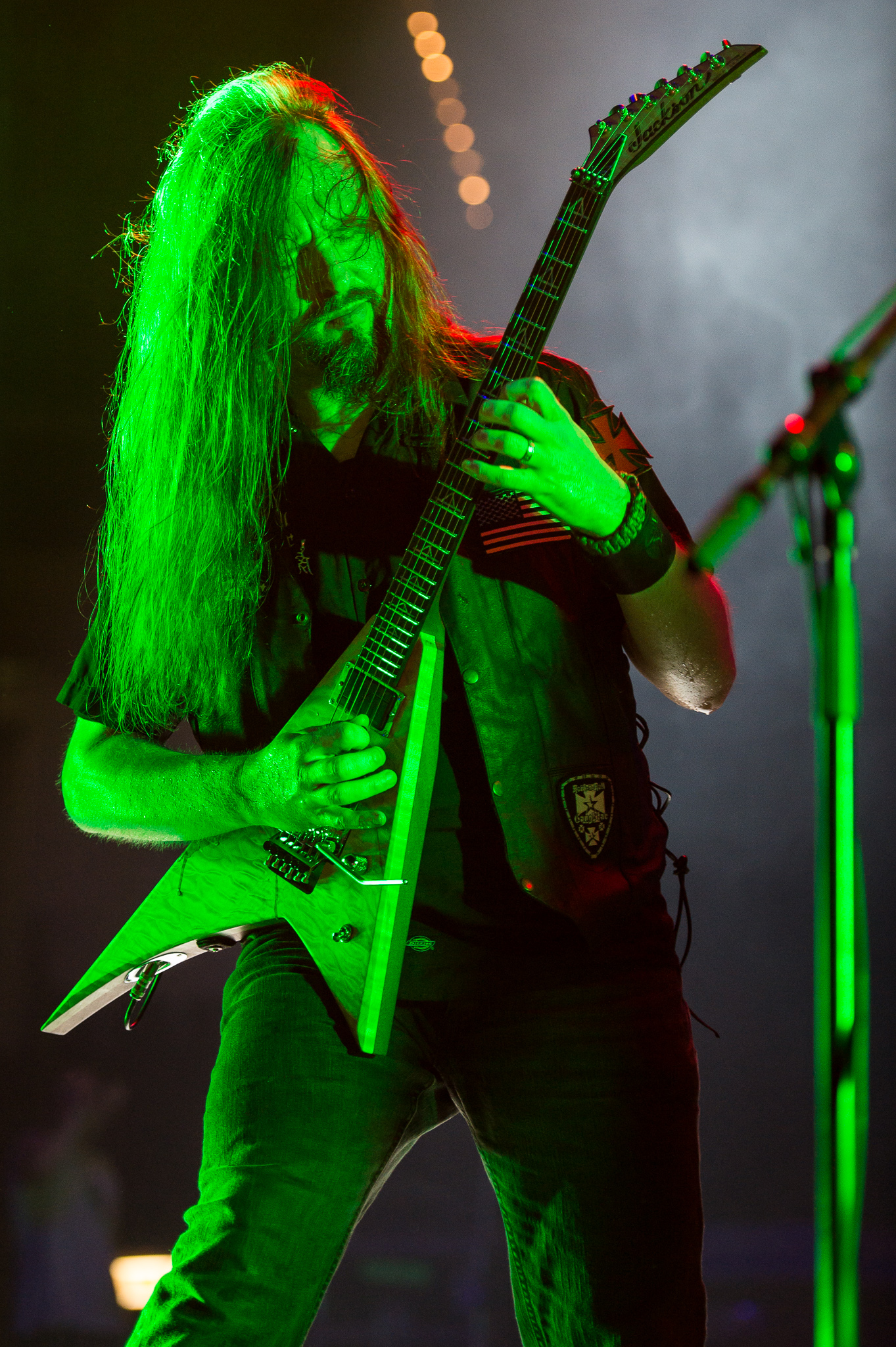
Herbert performing in 2015

Herbert's had a perfectionist playing style and would always perform sober. He once stated in a 2015 interview:

Every time I perform, I know every single mistake that I made that night... I don't let it destroy me if I miss a couple notes, but the next day in the practice room, I [think], 'This is what needs to happen, this is what you messed up, let's work on it...' If I see improvement on that part, I'm like, 'All right'

Herbert strived for "tangible results" and stated that he would spend up to three hours locked in a room working on a single lick.

Mike Martin described Herbert as a machine, stating, "He was always a machine when it came to writing songs. When we would ask him to write some new material, he'd come up with about 20 songs that were ready to go. He was always like that." He would write almost everything for All That Remains albums.

In addition, Herbert spent time concentrating on jazz, working on all the melodic minor scales and arpeggio fingerings, which he credited in helping to open up his playing style. Herbert had an extensive background in music theory and classical guitar; he utilized this knowledge to construct some his solos. As for his technique, Herbert was known for his expansive arpeggio vocabulary and legato chops, additionally implementing speed picking and slower lines in contrast to that. His former bandmate Phil Labonte later stated "There was no one that worked harder at guitar, music theory and music than Oli Herbert."

Herbert used B Standard on Behind Silence and Solitude, D Standard on both This Darkened Heart and The Fall of Ideals; and C♯ Standard from Overcome to Victim of the New Disease.

Herbert had stated his biggest influence on guitar was Andy LaRocque of King Diamond. He has also mentioned that he drew much influence from George Lynch, John Sykes, and Randy Rhoads.

== Discography ==
=== All That Remains ===
- Behind Silence and Solitude (2002)
- This Darkened Heart (2004)
- The Fall of Ideals (2006)
- Overcome (2008)
- For We Are Many (2010)
- A War You Cannot Win (2012)
- The Order of Things (2015)
- Madness (2017)
- Victim of the New Disease (2018)
