= The Order of Things (album) =

Studio album by All That Remains
- Released: February 24, 2015
- Recorded: 2014
- Length: 48:41; 52:13 (Japanese version)
- Label: Razor & Tie
- Producer: Josh Wilbur

All That Remains chronology
A War You Cannot Win (2012)	The Order of Things (2015)	Madness (2017)

Singles from The Order of Things
- 1. "No Knock" Released: November 24, 2014; 2. "This Probably Won't End Well" Released: January 13, 2015; 3. "Tru-Kvlt-Metal" Released: February 10, 2015; 4. "For You" Released: May 13, 2015; 5. "Victory Lap" Released: December 8, 2015; 6. "Criticism and Self-Realization" Released: May 4, 2016

The Order of Things is the seventh studio album by the American heavy metal band All That Remains. It was released on February 24, 2015, on Razor & Tie Records. The Order of Things is the first studio album to be produced by Josh Wilbur. It is also the final album to feature bassist Jeanne Sagan due to her departure from the band in September 2015. The album debuted at number 25 on the US Billboard 200, selling 19,150 copies in its first week only in the United States.

== Background ==
The album was recorded and produced by Josh Wilbur. All That Remains officially began recording the album on July 14, 2014, and wrapped up recording on August 27. On November 20, the group revealed the album's name and release date.

Phil Labonte and producer Josh Wilbur wrote the lyrics for the album together, which is the first time in All That Remains catalogue. Phil Labonte stated about working with Wilbur: "Honestly, the test for me is, like, when me and Josh [got] done, 'cause we wrote the melodies and the lyrics together; none of the vocals were done before I actually sat down with Josh. This is the first time that anyone has ever had any kind of input onto lyrics. But Josh is the only guy that's actually worked with me about lyrics and stuff, and it's been completely wonderful."

The album art for this album is based on an upwards view of the ceiling of the Pantheon in Rome, Italy.

== Musical style ==
Phil Labonte stated about the album: "I think this record is far and away better than our last one. It's, in my opinion, far and away better than 'Overcome'." Personally, I think that we have a lot of songs on the new album that are better. He also stated: "I think the record overall is probably leaning 'sing-y.' We've got 12 songs, and there's probably four or five songs that are beginning to end singing. There's some screaming worked into two or three."

Drummer Jason Costa stated about the album: "It definitely still sounds like us. But the heavy stuff is heavier, and the faster stuff is faster. We all really challenged ourselves on this album. And the radio stuff is more… not more radio, but there's definitely more singing, there's more melody and stuff like that. But the songs are fast; we have a lot of fast burners on this album. And the double-bass stuff for the heavier songs is really challenging for me this time. The patterns are super-hard, some of them."

== Release and promotion ==
The first song released from the album was "No Knock". The song was first posted by Labonte's pseudo-account called "Harrison Ford" with the video that was released on November 14, 2014 entitled "You Found Me". It later on was posted by All That Remains official YouTube Channel. The first official single "This Probably Won't End Well" was released on January 13, 2015, reaching number 11 on the US Mainstream Rock chart and later had a music video released on February 3. "Tru-Kvlt-Metal" is the second non-official and third single released on February 10.

The album was officially released on February 24, 2015, it debuted at number 25 on the US Billboard 200, selling 19,150 copies in the United States. The album also reached number 3 on both the US Top Hard Rock Albums and Independent Albums along with number 17 on the Canadian charts. A music video for the song "For You" was later released on July 20, and tells the story of a volatile marriage. The final music video for the album was released on December 8, for the song "Victory Lap".

The group held the North American "Order of Things Tour" in support of the album in November and December of 2015 alongside Devour the Day, Audiotopsy and Sons of Texas. The group also played at Chicago Open Air, Rockfest 2016 and Rock’n Derby.

== Critical reception ==
Professional ratings
Review scores
Source	Rating
About.com	3/5 stars
AllMusic	2.5/5 stars
Artistdirect	5/5 stars
Blabbermouth.net	7.5/10
MetalSucks	1.5/5 stars
Ultimate-guitar	5.3 stars on a 10 point scale
Lambgoat	6/10
Metal.de	5/10

Unlike the majority of the band's previous albums, The Order of Things received mixed reviews from music critics.

AllMusic gave the album a 2.5/5 stating "the 12-track set is more or less an attractive-looking sandwich filled with factory-farmed cold cuts and a generous amount of cheese. Cuts like "Bite My Tongue," "The Divide," and even the muscular single "No Knock," fail to engage in any kind of meaningful way, confusing volume with power and soaring choruses with emotion."Ultimate-Guitar gave the album a score of 5.3/10, saying that "the need to subdue the band's melodeath roots damages the full potential of the album, and the new raison d'être to be 'catchy metal' has the band throwing their hat into a crowded and homogenized ring. Ultimately, this investment in a different sound doesn't pay off". Metalstorm.net gave the album a similar 5.6/10. They lead their review with "All That Remains moved so far away from the sound that originally made them famous, that I will be bound to use apologetic and vague phrases that both express my lack of love for what I am hearing and yet still admit that I understand how one could like it." MusicReviewRadar gave the record 2/5 stars stating that a tragic ballad sadly defined the main line of the entire record.

Conversely Blabbermouth.net gave the album a positive 7.5/10, taking a more neutral standpoint on the controversial sound change. "Phil Labonte and his team are joyously doing whatever the hell they want, praise or scorn them all you like."

== Track listing ==
All lyrics written by Phil Labonte and all music by All That Remains.

No.	Title	Length
1.	"This Probably Won't End Well"	3:48
2.	"No Knock"	2:48
3.	"Divide"	3:18
4.	"The Greatest Generation"	4:00
5.	"For You"	4:16
6.	"A Reason for Me to Fight"	3:42
7.	"Victory Lap"	3:54
8.	"Pernicious"	4:01
9.	"Bite My Tongue"	4:08
10.	"Fiat Empire"	4:04
11.	"Tru-Kvlt-Metal"	3:39
12.	"Criticism and Self-Realization"	7:03
Total length:		48:41

Japanese bonus track
No.	Title	Length
13.	"We Are Only Human"	3:32
Total length:		52:13

== Personnel ==
All That Remains

- Philip Labonte – lead vocals
- Oli Herbert – lead guitar
- Mike Martin – rhythm guitar
- Jeanne Sagan – bass guitar, backing vocals
- Jason Costa – drums

Additional

- Josh Wilbur – production, mixing, mastering
- Jim Fogarty – engineering
- Justin Borucki – photography
- Forefathers and Dan Bradley – design and layout

== Charts ==
Chart (2015)	Peak position
Australian Albums (ARIA)	72
Canadian Albums (Billboard)	17
Japanese Albums (Oricon)	150
UK Rock & Metal Chart (OCC)	31
UK Independent Album Breakers (OCC)	11
US Billboard 200 (Billboard)	25
US Digital Albums (Billboard)	17
US Top Hard Rock Albums (Billboard)	3
US Top Rock Albums (Billboard)	5
US Independent Albums (Billboard)	3
US Indie Store Album Sales (Billboard)	23
