= Jeanne Sagan =

American musician

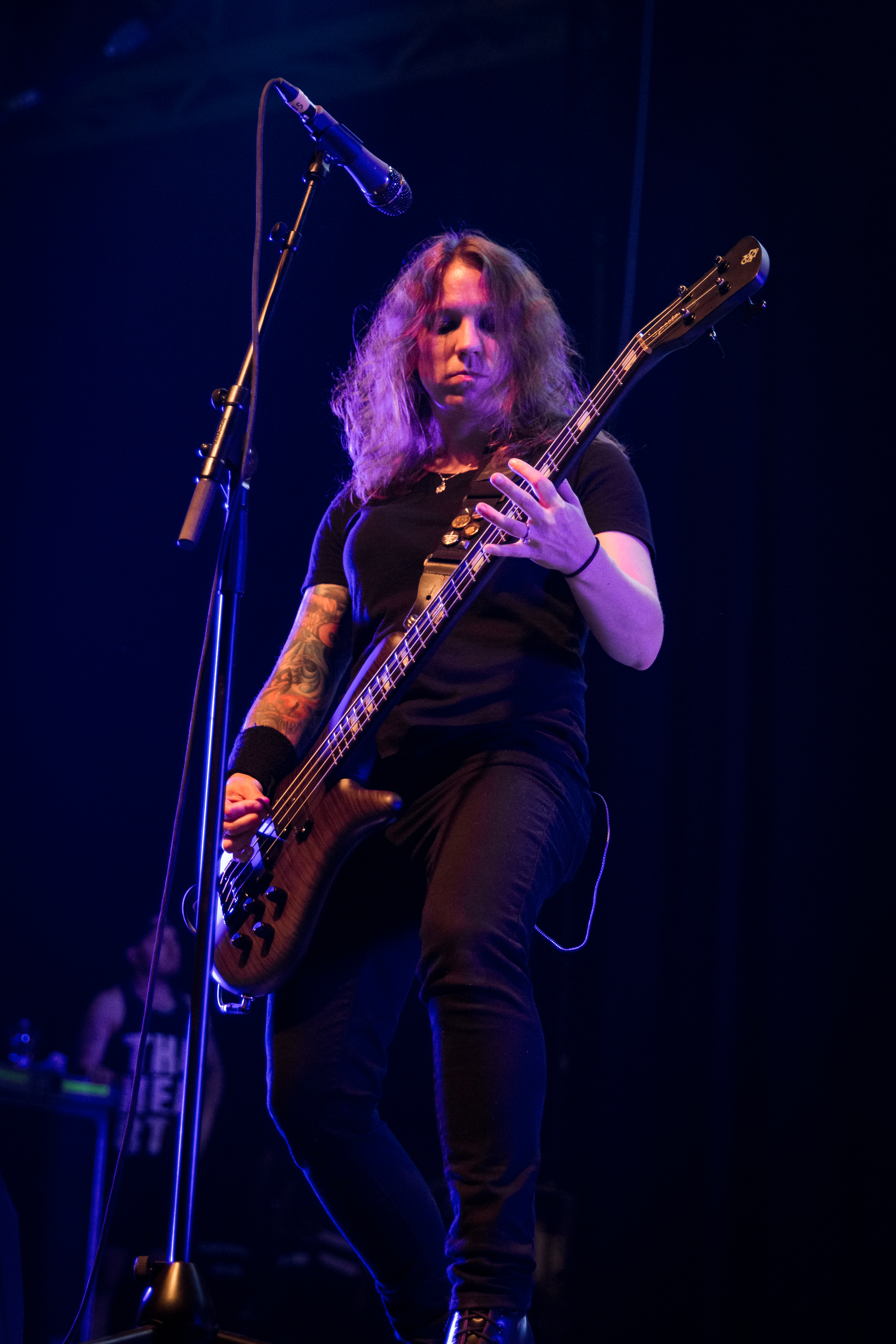
- Jeanne Sagan performing with All That Remains at Rock am Ring in 2015

Background information
- Born: Jeanne Sagan; January 11, 1979 (age 47); Springfield, Massachusetts, U.S.
- Genres: Hard rock; heavy metal; melodic metalcore
- Occupation: Musician
- Instruments: Bass guitar; vocals; piano
- Years active: 2001–present
- Labels: Prosthetic; Razor & Tie
- Member of: Crossing Rubicon, Blood Has Been Shed
- Formerly of: All That Remains; The Acacia Strain; Light is the Language

Jeanne Sagan (born January 11, 1979) is an American musician. She is the bassist and backing vocalist for the heavy metal band Crossing Rubicon, but is best known as the bassist and backing vocalist for the heavy metal band All That Remains from 2006 to 2015.

== Biography ==
Sagan first got into music in sixth grade, and later played the trumpet as her first instrument during high school, her younger brother is also in the music business, serving as a DJ’ing and touring with bands. She first began playing bass while attending college where she started playing with local bands. One of those bands was Light is the Language with whom she recorded one album with.

Sometime in the early 2000s Sagan moved to Arizona thinking she was done with her home state of Massachusetts, however after meeting someone at the Prosthetic Records she started working at merchandise tables for the label and eventually ended up back in Massachusetts. In 2003, she became the bassist for the Acacia Strain. It was while she was working for Prosthetic Records that she was tabbed by All That Remains to replace their previous bassist Matt Deis. She made her recording debut on their 2006 album The Fall of Ideals. In total she recorded five albums with the band the last being 2015’s The Order of Things which seen her provide backing vocals on multiple tracks.

In October 2015, Sagan announced her amicable departure from All That Remains in order to pursue personal interests. She was replaced by Aaron "Bubble" Patrick, formerly of the band Bury Your Dead.

Following her departure from All That Remains she joined Crossing Rubicon, alongside her husband, frontman Scotty Anarchy. She currently plays bass and backing vocals for the group.

== Gear ==
As of November 2012, Sagan plays a black cherry Spector Legend 4 Classic four-string bass with EMG 35DC active pickups, and Ampeg SVT bass amplifiers. She is a former Ibanez player, using both Soundgear 4-strings and an ARTB100 four-string, the latter of which can be seen in the music video for the song "Hold On" from the album For We Are Many. She uses Orange amplifiers and Omega speaker cabinets.

== Discography ==
=== Light is the Language ===
- The Void Falls Silent – (2001)

=== All That Remains ===
- The Fall of Ideals – (2006)
- Overcome – (2008)
- For We Are Many – (2010)
- A War You Cannot Win – (2012)
- The Order of Things – (2015)

=== Crossing Rubicon ===
- No Less Than Everything – (2016)
- Seeing Red – (2019)

== Gallery ==
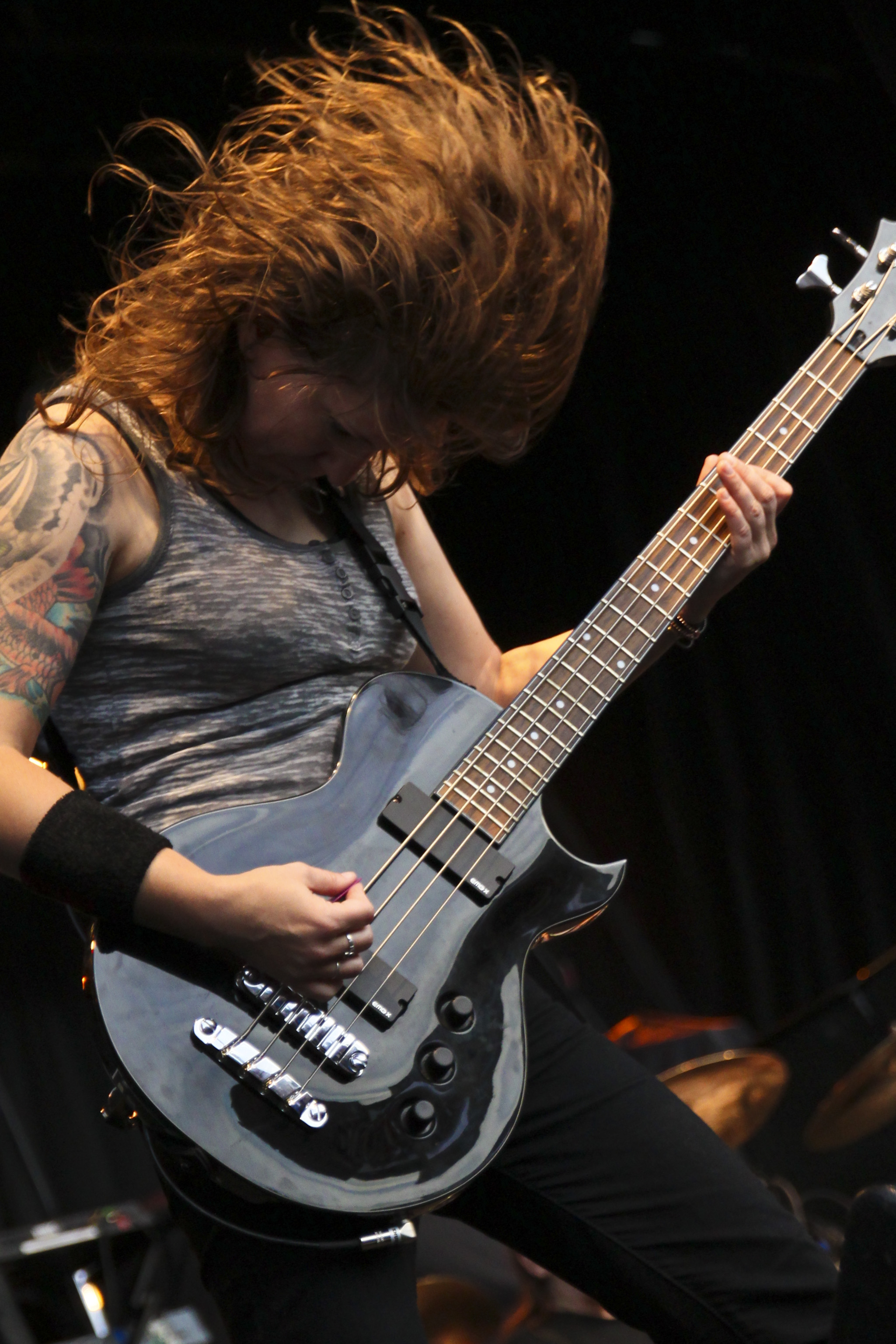
93X Fest in Duluth, MN

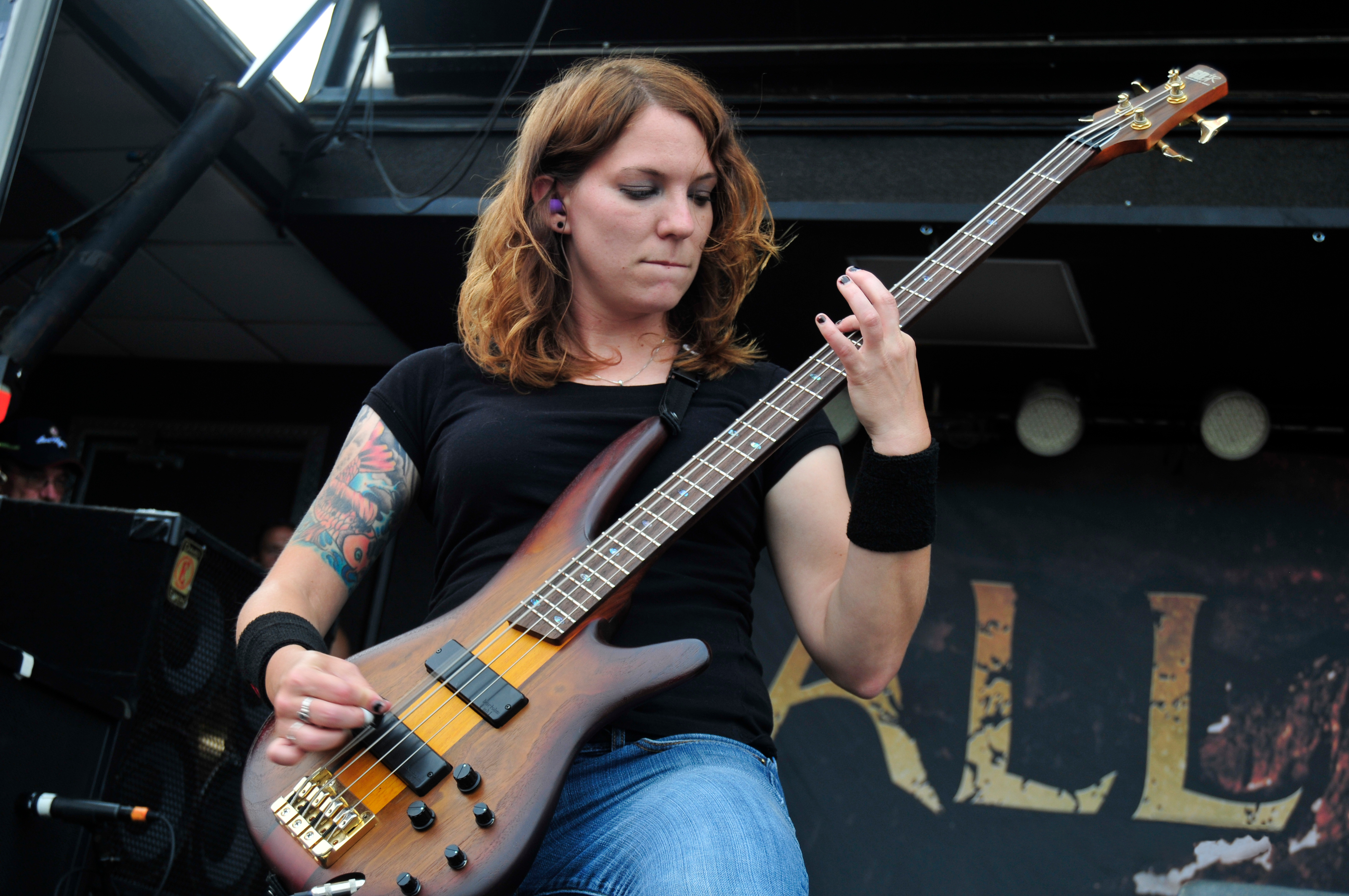

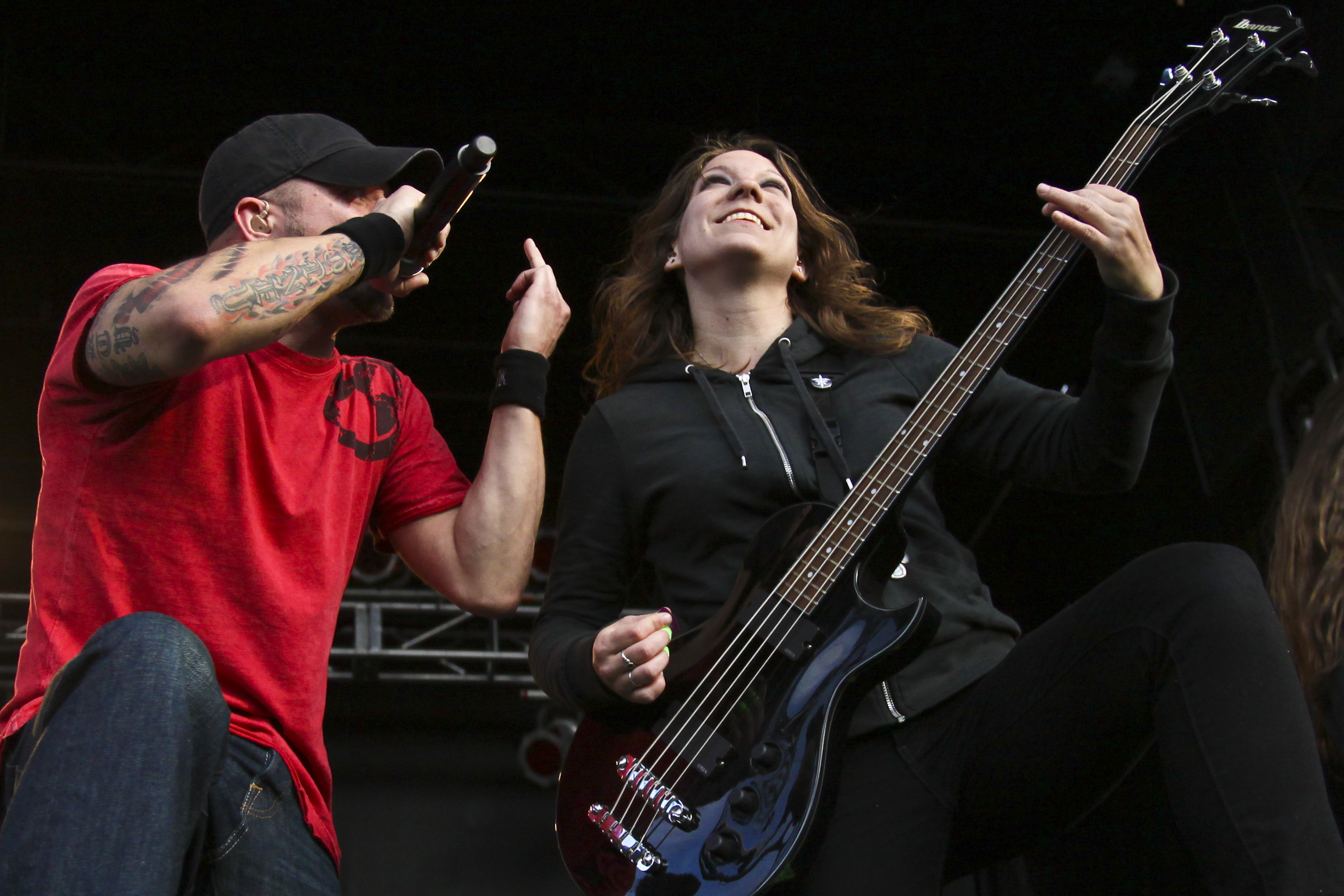
Performing with Phil Labonte
