= The Fall of Ideals =

Studio album by All That Remains
- Released: July 11, 2006
- Recorded: October 2005 – February 2006
- Studio: Zing Studios in Westfield, Massachusetts
- Genre: Melodic metalcore
- Length: 38:59
- Labels: Prosthetic; Razor & Tie
- Producer: Adam Dutkiewicz

All That Remains chronology
This Darkened Heart (2004)	The Fall of Ideals (2006)	Overcome (2008)

Singles from The Fall of Ideals
- 1. "This Calling" Released: June 27, 2006; 2. "The Air That I Breathe" Released: July 4, 2006; 3. "Not Alone" Released: August 11, 2006

The Fall of Ideals is the third studio album by the American heavy metal band All That Remains, released on July 11, 2006. Three music videos were created for the songs "This Calling", "Not Alone" and "The Air That I Breathe". It is the only All That Remains release with drummer Shannon Lucas and the band's first album to feature bassist Jeanne Sagan. The album debuts the band's signature melodic metalcore sound that it would become known for, with choruses contained in nearly every track. The album also became the band’s first to reach the Billboard 200, peaking at number 75 with 13,000 copies sold in its first week.

It is viewed as a landmark in the metalcore genre with Revolver Magazine dubbing it one of metalcore’s most essential records.

== Background ==
The Fall of Ideals was produced by Killswitch Engage guitarist Adam Dutkiewicz and engineered by Soilwork guitarist Peter Wichers. The release marked a turning point for band, as they shifted away from the heavier death metal sound of their first two records. With The Fall of Ideals, the group embraced a more melodic metalcore approach that would come to shape much of their future work. This album also featured the debut of bassist Jeanne Sagan, who would go on to become a longtime member of the lineup. Drummer Shannon Lucas who joined the band in 2005 would leave shortly after the album’s release to join The Black Dahlia Murder making this his only recording with the band.

The band officially began recording the album at Zing Studios in Westfield Massachusetts in March 2006. The albums title "The Fall of Ideals" was officially announced on March 31.

Labonte described the recording process as the most relaxing session they ever had with Adam Dutkiewicz, stating "we showed up with our ideas and were kinda expecting Adam to be like, ‘Well change this and change that.’ [But] there was very little that he thought should change. He was like, ‘Yeah, this is all good."

The album cover was created by Travis Smith.

== Music and lyrics ==
The music on The Fall of Ideals has been characterized as "speedy metalcore that takes obvious cues from melodeath." According to Revolver, "The Fall of Ideals represents the pinnacle of [All That Remains'] focused headbanging metalcore era." Phillip Labonte's screams on the album have been described as "deep," and Oli Herbert's guitar riffs are described as "intense". Labonte’s vocals also range from grindcore growls and howls to metal screams and yells to smooth melodies. The album's instrumentation makes use of harmonized guitar work, as well as what Greg Prato of AllMusic describes as "chug-a-lug riffs," drawing comparison to Iron Maiden and Metallica.

Lambgoat described the album as “more melodic. For example, while most songs use the formula of having metal verses, and melodic singing choruses, the seventh track (entitled "Six") is very close to a melodic death metal songs, [sic] ala Vehemence. On the flip side there are tracks that utilize more melody, whether in the riffs or singing, than an aggressive, metal style." Having Shannon Lucas’ drumming also permitted them to explore more aggressive double-bass and fast parts. This resulted in the song "This Calling", which came together after Labonte tested out how fast Shannon could play double bass.

As for the composition of the album lead singer Phil Labonte stated in a 2007 interview:

A lot of this record was written by Olie, [Herbert] who probably wrote about 70% of this record. Then he would bring it to us and we’d work the rest of it as a band. It was very much a collaboration when it came to putting everything together. We’d put the songs into a computer and them move them around and chop them up a bit. With this record while we were writing, we had a lot of things happen on the business side where we went and got new management. That’s the stuff that I’ve always had a hand in and on the last record, even though I wrote the majority of the material, but it was still a collaboration. This time it wasn’t that I was relinquishing control, but it was just that I didn’t have as much time to write. A lot of the stuff that was written had been written months previous over the course of touring behind This Darkened Heart.

=== Lyrics ===
Labonte has stated that the album's lyrics were more uplifting/optimistic compared to the band's previous two records due to him being in a positive spot in his life while writing them, stating “I felt like I had a lot of things to say and a lot of stuff I wanted to get across to people and I was in a really really good spot in my life. And I felt things were so optimistic and we were very excited.” “So that’s why there’s so many songs, like ‘The Air That I Breathe,’ that are just about overcoming challenges … ‘It Dwells in Me’ ... those songs really kind of speak to making the most out of your situation. And that was kinda where I was … things felt good and it felt really natural … It was a special time.” Despite this, some tracks with negative connotations such as "Six", which is lyrically themed around heartbreak, exist on the record. The song “We Stand” was originally ment to be an instrumental track is about self-reliance and fortitude.” In a review by Ultimate guitar they stated “the lyrics seem to follow a certain trend Like a guy struggling with various problems but still prevails, never giving up and pulling through.”

When asked about the albums title and lyrical themes of the album Labonte responded:

the idea behind it is that most people’s convictions now days, last only as long as it’s comfortable. People are always like, “I believe this” or “I believe that” until they find out that believing in something means you may have to stand up for something. Believing in something means you might have to tell someone something and run the risk of upsetting them because of your beliefs.

== Promotion and release ==
All That Remains released "This Calling" as the lead single on June 11, 2006, which was accompanied by a music video that received rotation on MTV2's Headbangers Ball. The second single "The Air I Breathe" was released on July 4, of that the songs music video later debuted on Headbangers Ball on November 11. A third and final music video for "Not Alone" was later released in October of 2007.

The album was officially released on July 11, 2006 and was the band's first to enter the Billboard 200 charts, at number 75, with just under 13,000 copies sold. Internationally the album also reached the charts in Japan reaching 194, along with reaching number 28 and 27 respectively on the U.K. rock and independent charts. On May 23, 2008, it was announced that the album had sold in excess of 175,000 copies worldwide. As of 2021, it has since sold over 450,00 copies.

All That Remains toured on the second stage at Ozzfest 2006 in support of the album. They also headlined a North American tour in early-2007 with support from Misery Signals and The Human Abstract.

The song "Six" is featured in Guitar Hero II. "This Calling" is available as downloadable content for Rock Band and was also used as the lead track for the Saw III soundtrack and on the Masters of Horror II soundtrack.

In celebration of the albums 15th anniversary in 2021, the band reissued the album on vinyl with different color variants and deluxe packaging.

== Reception ==
Professional ratings
Review scores
Source	Rating
About.com	4.5/5 stars
AllMusic	2.5/5 stars
Blabbermouth.net	7.5/10
Brave Words & Bloody Knuckles	8/10
PopMatters	8/10
Ultimate Guitar	10/10
Lambgoat	5/5
Seaoftranquility	4/5 stars
V13.net	10/10

Greg Prato of AllMusic gave the album an average review, saying: "There's just not a lot differentiating All That Remains from the oodles of other metal bands vying for Ozzfest spots circa 2006." Scott Alisoglu of Blabbermouth.net gave the album a more positive review stating “All That Remains effortlessly blends thrashy twin guitar fireworks and Phil Labonte's raging vocals with soaring clean vocals and overall tunefulness. One could choose to call much of the material on "The Fall of Ideals" formulaic, but it is a formula that usually works. Adrien Begrand of Pop Matters hailed, "ALL THAT REMAINS has made the kind of stylistic leap that most bands can only wish they could pull off” “The Fall Of Ideals' [is] invigorating from start to finish, and could very well be the metalcore album of the year."

Rob McFeters of Lambgoat gave the album a perfect score simply stating “The entire band executes the songs perfectly," adding that "the production is full and crisp." Scott Borre of Seaoftranquility wrote “The Fall of Ideals is not an album to just pass over. Even if you don't like some of the metalcore out there, All that Remains has managed to put out an album that has songs that many fans of metal can enjoy.”

A reviewer from Ultimate Guitar wrote "Phil Labonte is a very skilled vocalist and one of the best in metalcore today, period." He added "These are possibly the hookiest and most impressive choruses I've heard in metal. similar to As I Lay Dying and some Killswitch Engage."

It was ranked the 14th best metal album of 2006 by Pop Matters.

Fans regard the guitar solo in the song "Six" as among the best in the metalcore genre, according to Loudwire.

== Legacy ==
The album has been described as a metalcore classic, genre defining, and having "set the template" for future metalcore bands that would follow. Loudwire stated “It’s an album that helped more people take metalcore seriously as a genre, and bridge the worlds between metal’s more extreme and accessible ends of the spectrum.” In 2019, the album was voted #3 in Revolver Magazine’s top 5 greatest metalcore albums of all time. In 2020 it was voted the 5th greatest metalcore album of all time on Ultimate Guitar.

In the Spring of 2022 All That Remains embarked on a 15th anniversary tour for the album, playing it in its entirety with Miss I May and Varials serving as support. That same year the band released a 15 minute documentary looking back on the albums creation and impact.

== Track listing ==
All lyrics are written by Philip Labonte; all music is composed by Labonte, Oli Herbert, Mike Martin, and Jeanne Sagan.

No.	Title	Length
1.	"This Calling"	3:38
2.	"Not Alone"	3:30
3.	"It Dwells in Me"	3:14
4.	"We Stand"	3:47
5.	"Whispers (I Hear Your)"	3:39
6.	"The Weak Willed"	4:05
7.	"Six"	3:22
8.	"Become the Catalyst"	3:06
9.	"The Air That I Breathe"	3:34
10.	"Empty Inside"	3:22
11.	"Indictment"	3:42
Total length:		38:59

Japanese edition bonus track
No.	Title	Length
12.	"This Calling (Demo)"	3:33
Total length:		42:32

== Personnel ==
All That Remains

- Phil Labonte – vocals
- Oli Herbert – guitar, acoustic guitar
- Mike Martin – guitar
- Jeanne Sagan – bass
- Shannon Lucas – drums

Credits adapted from the official release of this LP

Production

- Produced and mixed by Adam Dutkiewicz
- Engineered by Peter Wichers
- Mastered by Alan Douches
- A&R by EJ Johantgen and Dan Fitzgerald

== Charts ==
Chart (2006)	Peak position
Japanese Albums (Oricon)	194
US Billboard 200	75

Official Charts Company	Peak Position
Rock and Metal Albums	28
Independent Albums	27
