= All That Remains (band) =

American heavy metal band

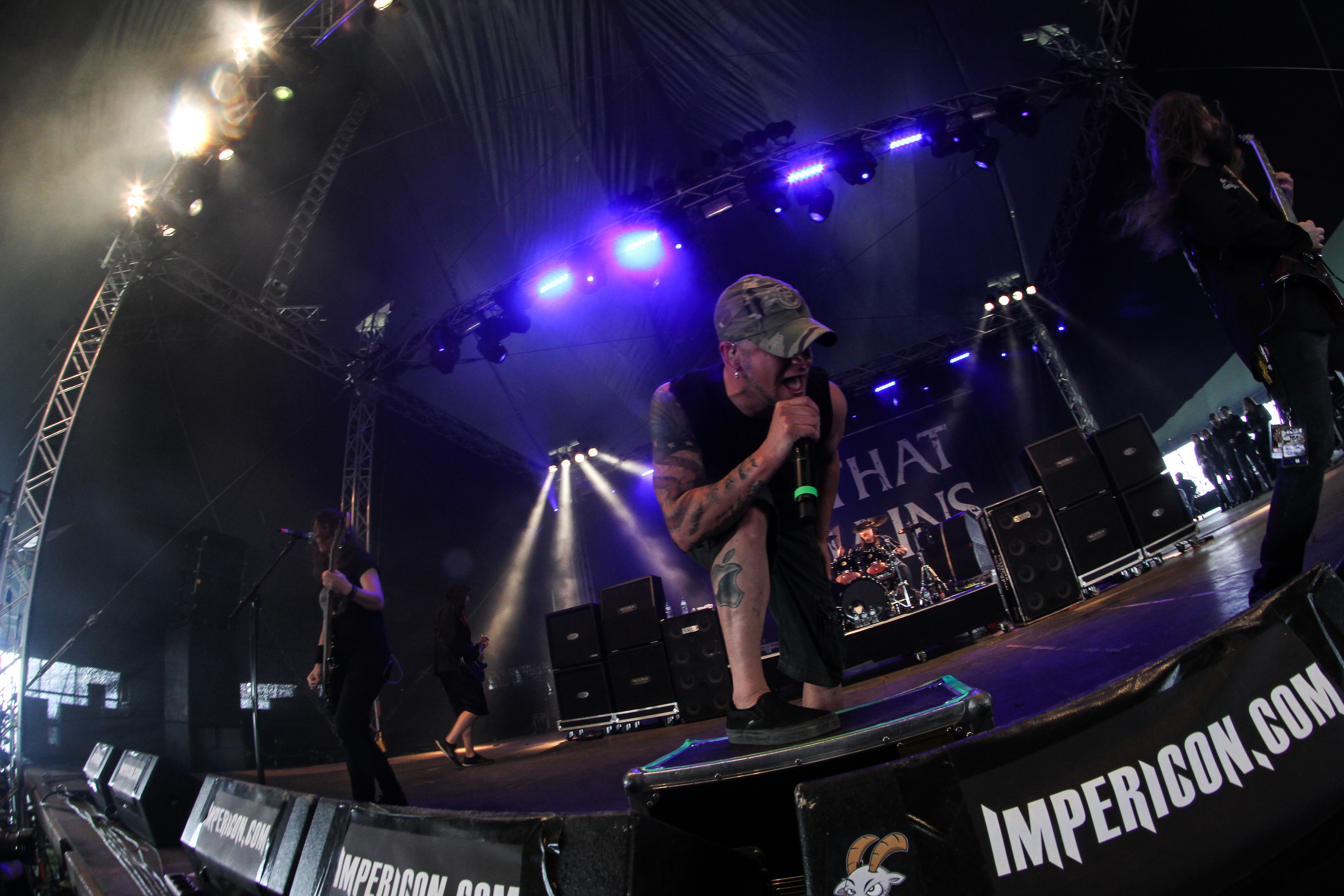
- All That Remains at With Full Force 2013

Background information
- Origin: Springfield, Massachusetts, U.S.
- Genres: Melodic metalcore; hard rock; heavy metal; melodic death metal (early)
- Years active: 1998–present
- Labels: Prosthetic; Razor & Tie
- Members: Philip Labonte; Mike Martin; Matt Deis; Anthony Barone; Ken Susi
- Past members: Oli Herbert; Dan Egan; Chris Bartlett; Michael Bartlett; Shannon Lucas; Josh Venn; Jeanne Sagan; Aaron Patrick; Jason Costa; Jason Richardson
- Website: allthatremainsonline.com

All That Remains is an American heavy metal band from Springfield, Massachusetts, formed in 1998. They have released ten studio albums, a live CD and DVD, and have sold over a million records worldwide. Established by vocalist Philip Labonte, the rest of the band consists of lead guitarist Ken Susi, rhythm guitarist Mike Martin, bassist Matt Deis and drummer Anthony Barone. The band have found varying commercial success over the course of their existence, earning three Recording Industry Association of America (RIAA) certification awards for their songs and recording six top-ten hits on the American Billboard Mainstream Rock chart, including their song "Stand Up" which went #1 in 2012.

== History ==
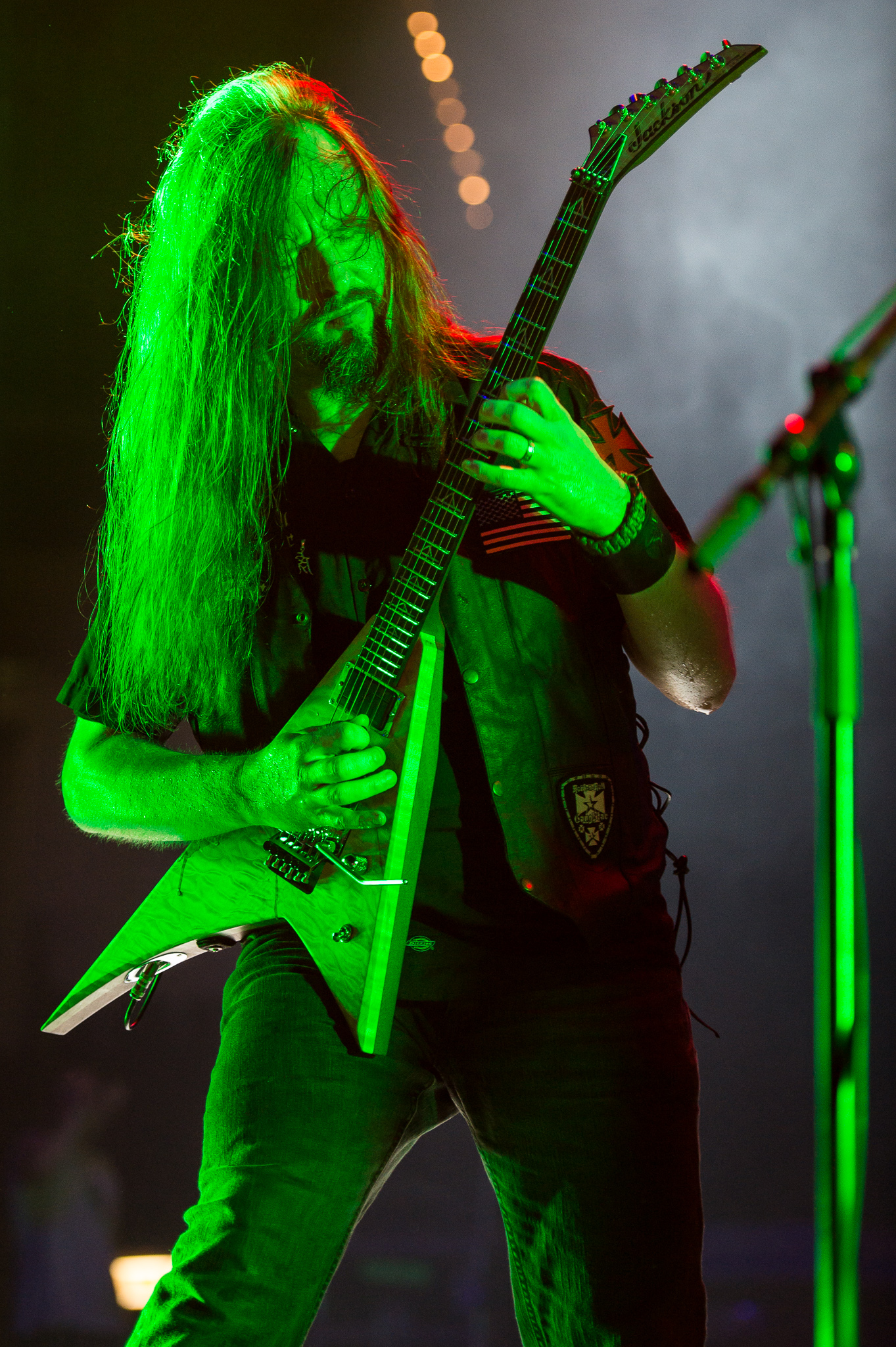
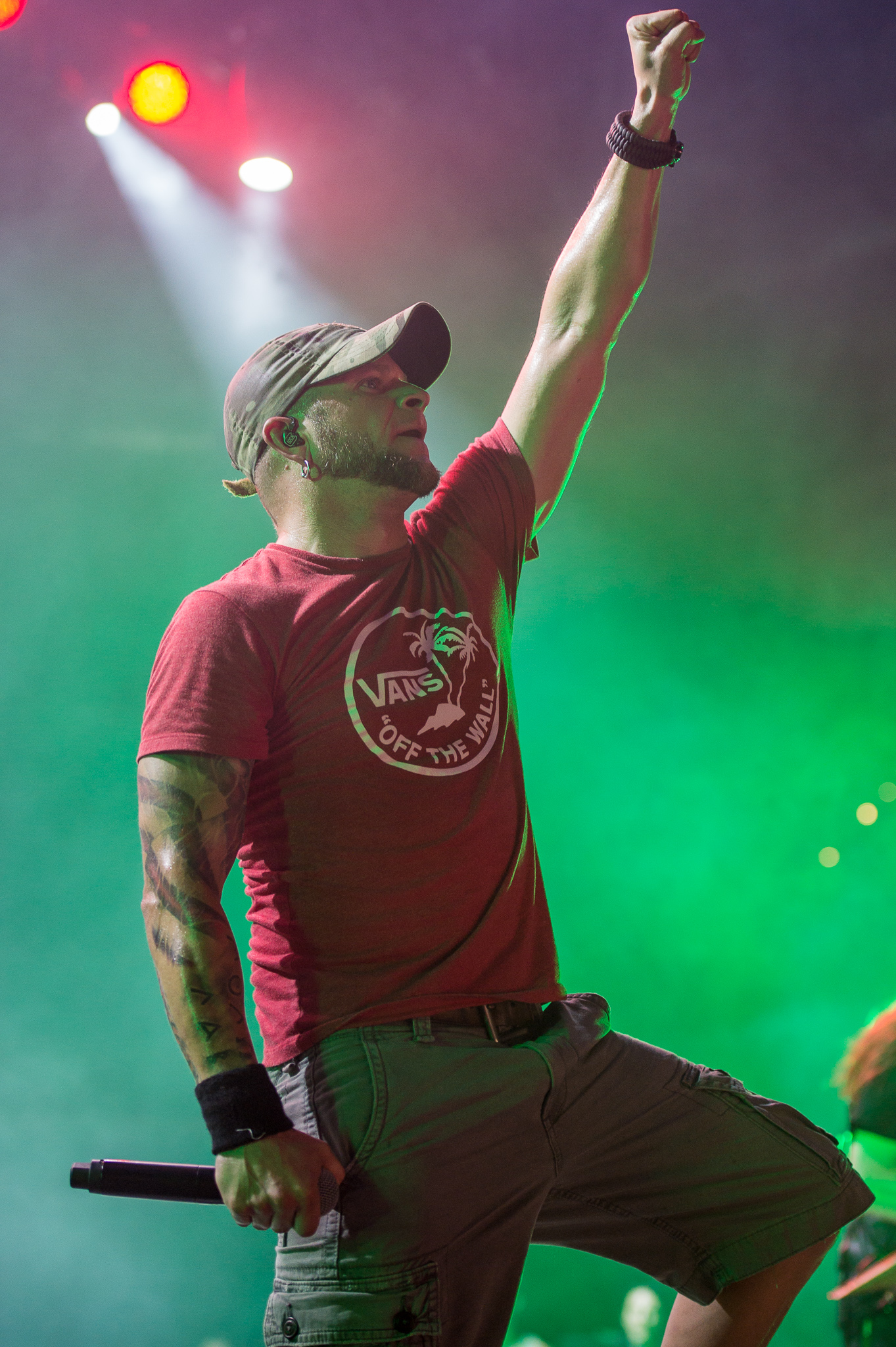
Guitarist Oli Herbert (left) and lead singer Phil Labonte (right) were the only remaining original band members until Herbert's death in 2018.

=== Formation and first releases (1998–2005) ===
Phil Labonte, the vocalist for All That Remains, was originally the vocalist for Shadows Fall and appeared on the cult classic album Somber Eyes to the Sky. After being asked to leave because of "musical differences", Phil focused entirely on All That Remains, a side project he had been working on prior to leaving. Labonte first recruited Dan Egan on bass, then the band's future guitarist Mike Martin tried out for guitar, not making the cut on his first go around. He then told Labonte to get in contact with his guitar teacher Oli Herbert. Herbert then auditioned for the band and ended up joining. Chris Bartlett and Michael Bartlett rounded out the rest of the band playing lead guitar and the drums respectively.

The band released their debut album, Behind Silence and Solitude, on March 26, 2002, through Prosthetic Records. The style of the album differs from their current melodic metalcore musical style they have had since 2006, and more prominently contains elements of melodic death metal. It was also the band's only release featuring the original members Bartlett and Egan. Mike Martin who had originally tried out for the band in 1998, then officially joined the band shortly after the album’s release replacing Bartlett on guitar. In November 2002, All That Remains toured alongside Bloodlet, during December they toured alongside Crematorium, Origin and Scar Culture.

Their second album, This Darkened Heart, was released on March 23, 2004, through Prosthetic Records. Produced by Killswitch Engage guitarist Adam Dutkiewicz, the album featured better production compared to its predecessor. The three singles that were released from the album are "This Darkened Heart", "Tattered on My Sleeve", and "The Deepest Gray". Music videos were created for all three. This Darkened Heart is the first album with current guitarist Mike Martin. One of All That Remains first major tours came in 2004 while they were opening for GWAR. While on tour Herbert’s wife quit her job and gave him an ultimatum and told Herbert that she would leave him if he did not return home immediately. Herbert initially gave into his wife’s demands however following a conversation with GWAR lead singer Dave Brockie he convinced Herbert to stay on the tour and stick with the band.

In May 2005 Matt Deis left the band for undisclosed reasons, he was temporarily replaced by Josh Venn, of Blood Has Been Shed. Jeanne Sagan then took over as a permanent replacement in 2006. In October 2005 All That Remains toured alongside Trivium in the UK.

=== The Fall of Ideals, Overcome, and success (2006–2009) ===
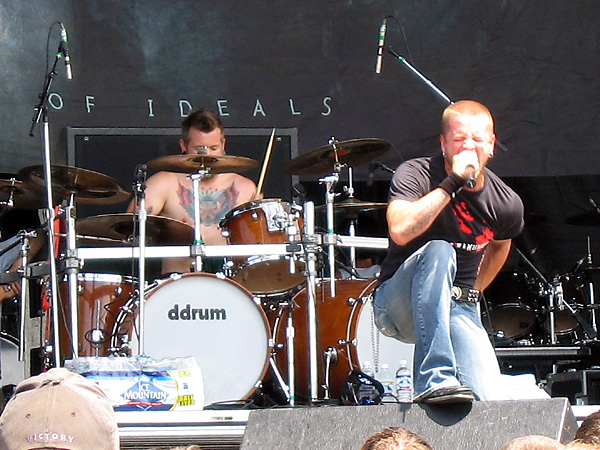
Shannon Lucas and Phil Labonte performing at Ozzfest 2006

Their third album, The Fall of Ideals, was released on July 11, 2006, through Prosthetic Records. Once again, the album was produced by Adam Dutkiewicz. The album is also considered to be the band's breakthrough release, as it entered the Billboard 200 charts at number 75, selling almost 13,000 copies in its first week. "This Calling" was released as the album's first single. Two music videos were created, with one incorporating footage from Saw III (as it was the lead song from the film's soundtrack). A music video was made for the album's second single "The Air That I Breathe". The band was also a part of Ozzfest 2006. The song "Six" is featured in Guitar Hero II as an unlockable song. The album is viewed as a classic in the metalcore genre; Rob McFeters of Lambgoat gave the album a perfect score, stating “The entire band executes the songs perfectly," adding that "the production is full and crisp.” Shortly after the album’s release Shannon Lucas left the band and was replaced by former Diecast drummer Jason Costa. In 2022, it was announced that The Fall of Ideals had surpassed 450,000 sales in the United States. A music video for the album's third single "Not Alone" was filmed on July 4 and was released on September 10, 2007. In November 2006, they supported Killswitch Engage on US dates and DragonForce on a UK tour in December. In January 2007, the band embarked on their first US headlining tour with Misery Signals, Light This City and Human Abstract serving as support. The band also played at Wacken Open Air in Wacken, Germany, to great success, and played a string of shows in Mexico in July. In the Fall they supported As I Lay Dying on a US tour. On November 30, 2007, All That Remains released a live CD/DVD album titled All That Remains Live.

In early 2008, they embarked on a headlining tour with support from Chimaira and Black Tide with Divine Heresy and Light This City splitting the tour's opening slot. Five Finger Death Punch was originally supposed to play but dropped off before the tour started due to vocal problems. Later that summer All That Remains appeared on the Midwestern leg of Van's Warped Tour 2008. The band visited Audiohammer Studios in May 2008 to record their fourth studio album, entitled Overcome, with producer Jason Suecof. The album was released on September 16, 2008, with critics giving it mixed reviews due to its more mainstream sound, many claiming that the band had focused on catchy melodies rather than technical heavy-metal riffs. The song "Chiron" was released as the first single from the album and a video was produced for it. Two singles from the album", Chiron" and "Two Weeks", were also released for Rock Band as downloadable content, along with "This Calling". The band released a video for "Two Weeks" in October. "Two Weeks" was also featured as a free playable download on the popular iPhone OS game Tap Tap Revenge 2. The track went on to become the band's first song to reach the Mainstream Rock Charts peaking at number 9. On June 10, All That Remains started touring on the Rockstar Mayhem Festival, playing the Jägermeister stage along with God Forbid and headliners Trivium. All That Remains and Trivium then embarked on a US co headlining tour in the Fall, they then supported In Flames on the second North American leg of their A Sense of Purpose Tour.

In April 2009, Phil Labonte posted on his Twitter that he was recording something in the studio on that same day with (at least) Oli and Mike. This turned out to be the acoustic version of "Forever in Your Hands". In late June 2009, drummer Jason Costa broke his hand, so the band temporarily recruited drummer Tony Laureano (Dimmu Borgir, Nile) to honor their commitment to the 2009 Rockstar Energy Mayhem Festival. In late September 2009, All That Remains announced "The Napalm & Noise Tour", which took place from November 23, 2009, to December 21, 2009. They co-headlined it with The Devil Wears Prada, and were supported by Story of the Year and Haste the Day.

=== For We Are Many (2010–2011) ===
All That Remains announced plans to start recording another album, which began in April 2010. The band later confirmed the album would be released later in the year with Adam Dutkiewicz as the chosen producer. The album was released on October 12, 2010. In October, All That Remains released the music video for their single "Forever in Your Hands". Also released on this day was a free download of the Japanese bonus track "Frozen" from Overcome. In January 2010, All That Remains won top honors in the Hard Rock/Metal category in the 9th Annual Independent Music Awards for the album.

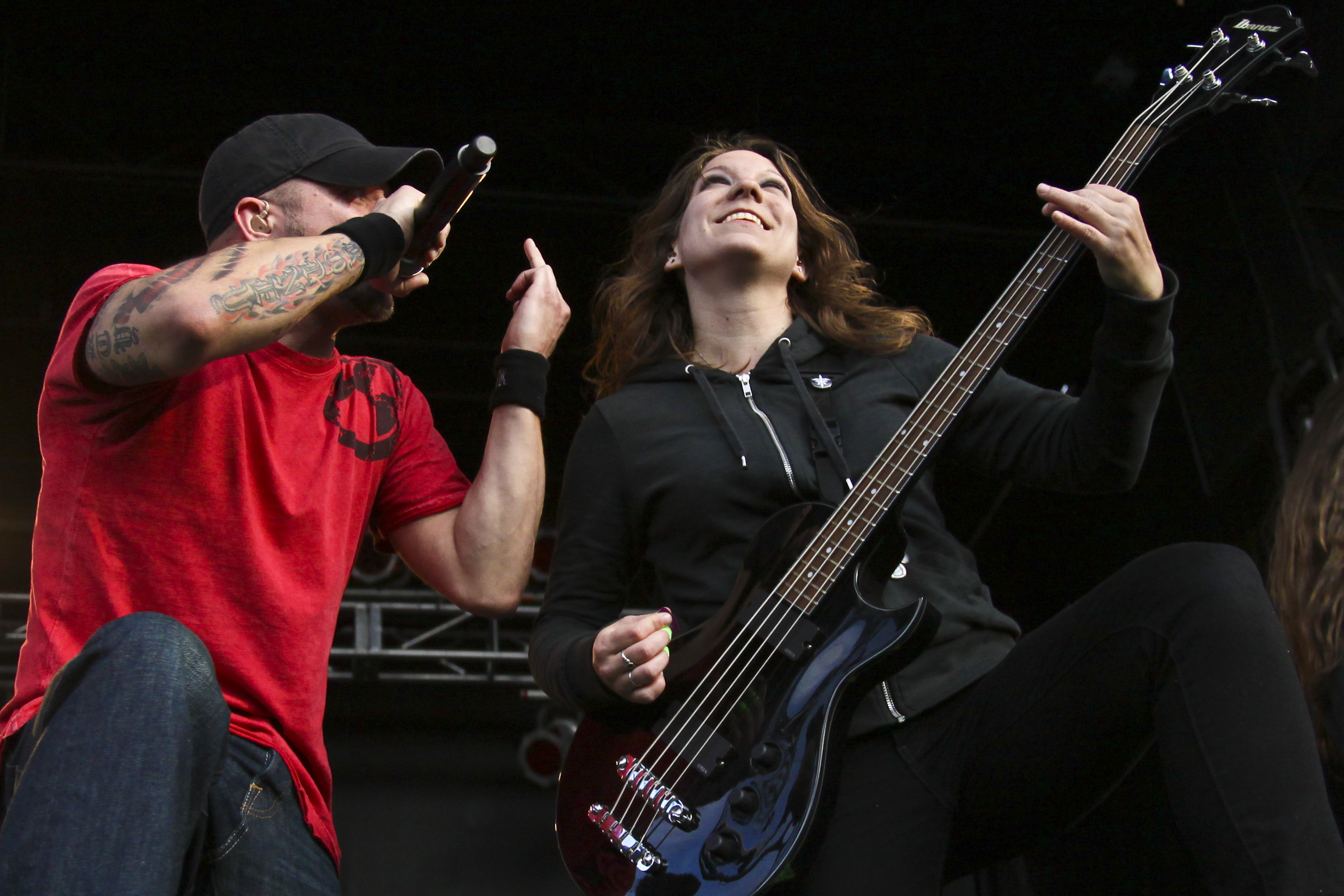
Phil Labonte and Jeanne Sagan in 2011

On June 8, 2010, All That Remains premiered the title track "For We Are Many" during a show in Burlington, Vermont, under the working title of "Dem Trims". On August 16 Labonte revealed the albums cover stating that it was the first time he had an idea for the album cover before they started working on it. adding "I wanted it to be heavy and let the art speak for itself. That was part of the reason for leaving the name of the band off the cover.” From August 18 to September 6, a free download of the title track, "For We Are Many", was available on the band's website after subscribing to their mailing list. On October 6, 2010, All That Remains released a music video for the single "Hold On". All 3 singles from the album broke into the top 10 on the US Mainstream Rock Chart.

"For We Are Many" was officially released on October 12 and became the bands best commercial performing album becoming their first to top the US Top Hard Rock Albums Billboard, along with peaking at number 10 on the Billboard 200 number 7 on Canadian Albums Chart selling just over 29,000 copies in its first week. This is the highest the band has charted ever charted on the mainstream charts in both countries. The album was met with generally positive reviews though not universally. It was noted for striking a good balance between the band's heavier metalcore sound and their more melodic tendencies. All That Remains then went on an extensive 18-month tour in support of the album. They also took part in the Share the Welt Fall tour with Hatebreed, Rains, and Five Finger Death Punch. On April 1, 2011, a music video for "The Last Time" was released. In July 2011 they joined Hollywood Undead on the Endless Summer Tour.

=== A War You Cannot Win (2012–2013) ===
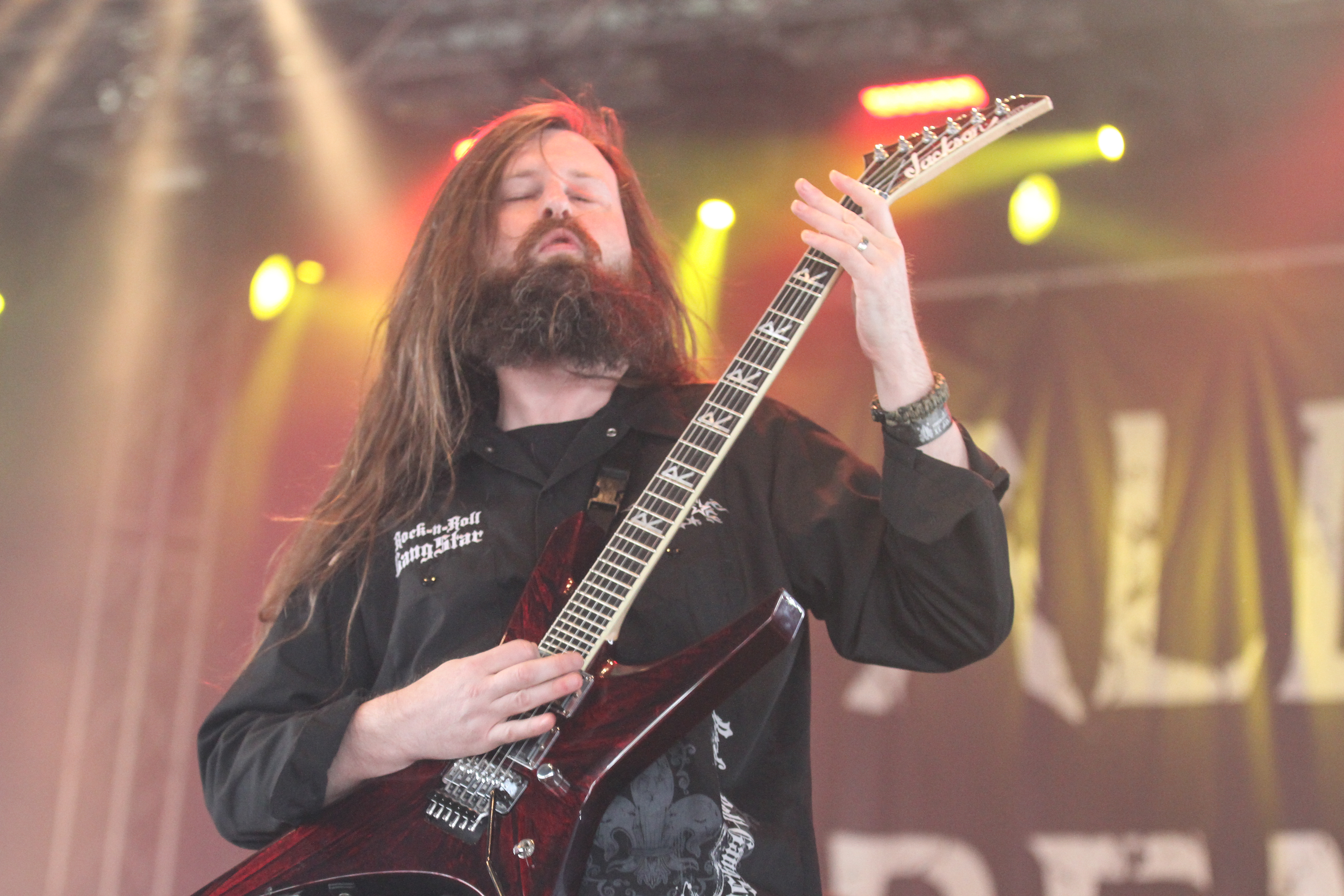
Guitarist Oli Herbert performing Full Force Festival 2013

On January 25, 2012, Phil Labonte stated that the band was working on new material. On June 21, they revealed that their upcoming sixth studio album is titled A War You Cannot Win. Prior to its release Labonte commented on the album in an interview with Blabbermouth.net "We really busted our asses and tried to do some new stuff.” On August 13, 2012, Phil uploaded "Down Through the Ages" to YouTube. All That Remains released the album cover to the album August 23. On August 27, the first single "Stand Up" was released on the radio. On August 29, All That Remains released the official lyric video to "Stand Up". The band has also released a free track of "Down Through the Ages" on their website from the album A War You Cannot Win, which was released on November 6, 2012. The album debuted at number 13 on the Billboard 200 selling 25,000 copies in its first week. The album was met with mostly positive reviews, but was also viewed as the bands shift to a more radio friendly sound. In Loudwire's review they commented on the albums "more mainstream hard rock direction" and highlights tracks like "What If I Was Nothing" as clear attempts to reach rock radio. Which ultimately worked as "Stand Up" became the band’s first to reach number 1 on the U.S. mainstream rock charts and “What If I Was nothing peaked at number 2. From August. 23 through Sept. 28. they took part in the Rock Allegiance Tour, alongside Volbeat, HIM and Airbourne. On October 21, 2013, the band released a music video for the track "What If I Was Nothing". They then went on tour in support of the album alongside Dethklok and Machine Head.

=== The Order of Things (2014–2015) ===
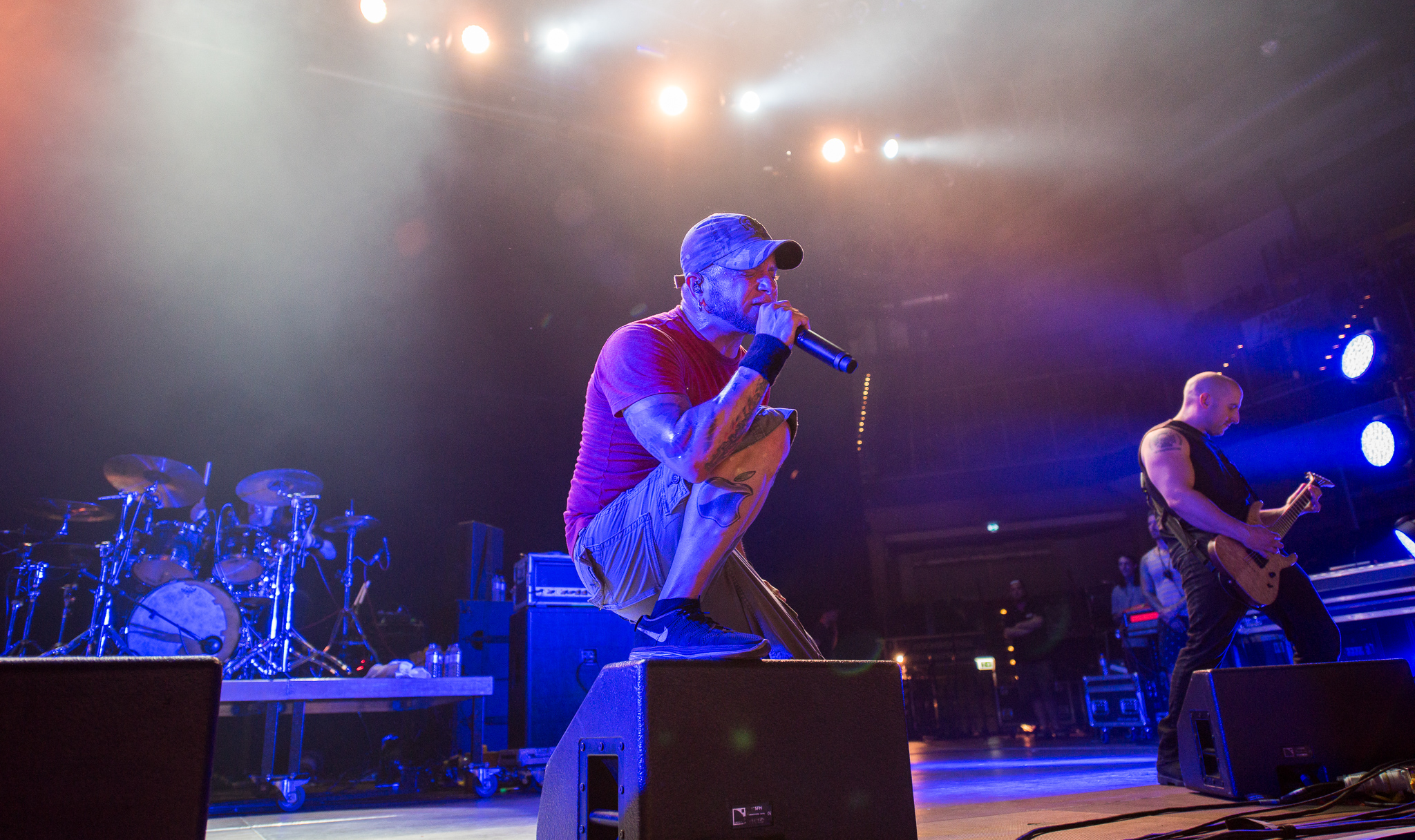
All That Remains performing at Rock im Park 2015

In January 2014, the band reported through their official Facebook page that they had started writing their seventh studio album. On June 26, 2014, it was confirmed that the band was in pre-production on their new album with producer Josh Wilbur, who had previously worked with Lamb of God and Gojira. The follow-up to 2012's A War You Cannot Win was tentatively due before the end of the year. However, during an interview with Phil Labonte on the Jasta Show, Phil stated that the new forthcoming record would more than likely be released in January. In an interview drummer Jason Costa claimed the album “will still sounds like us. But the heavy stuff is heavier, and the faster stuff is faster. We all really challenged ourselves on this album, but there's definitely more singing.”

On November 14, 2014, Phil Labonte announced that he released a new song from the new album. The song ended up being entitled "No Knock", which was released officially in digital stores on November 24, 2014. On November 20, Phil Labonte announced via Facebook that the new album title is The Order of Things. The album was released on February 24, 2015, via Razor & Tie, after the first single from the album, "This Probably Won't End Well", was released on January 13, 2015. It peaked at number 25 on the Billboard 200 selling 19,500 copies in its first week. Unlike the majority of the band's previous albums, The Order of Things received mixed reviews from music critics, as it seen them continue to stray away from their original sound and move even closer to a lighter/melodic sound. This was also the first album that seen some besides Labonte have an input on the lyrics as he wrote them alongside producer Josh Wilbur.

During the Spring of 2015 they joined In Flames as support on their “Charming America Tour.”

On September 24, 2015, the band announced the departure of Jeanne Sagan and the introduction of her replacement on bass, Aaron Patrick, formerly of Bury Your Dead and Devildriver. In November 2015 they started a U.S. tour in support of the album, Devour The Day, Audiotopsy and Sons Of Texas joined the tour as support.

=== Madness (2016–2018) ===
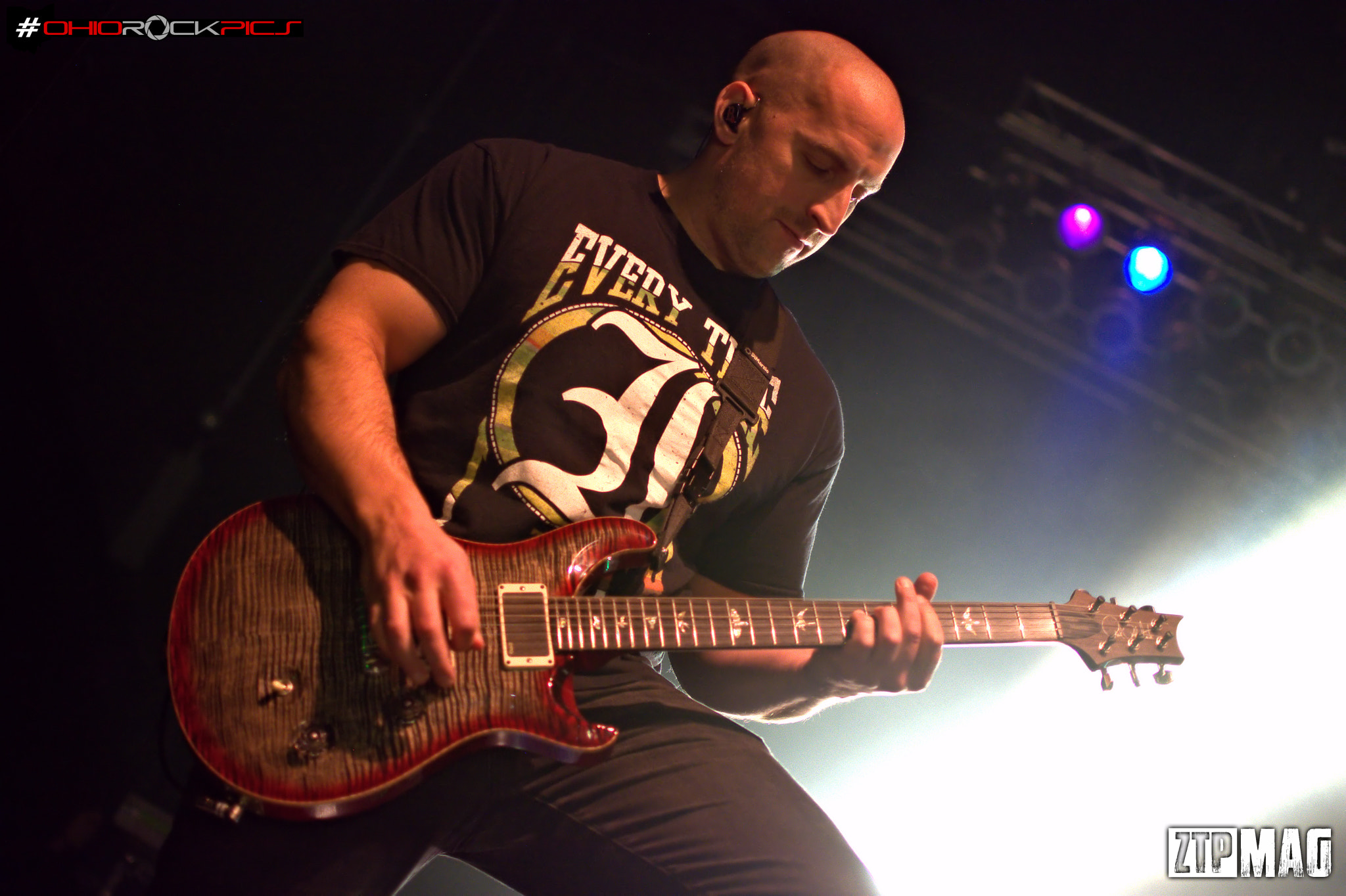
Rhythm Guitarist Mike Martin performing at Blitzmas 2015

In May 2016 it was reported that All That Remains were recording their eighth album at a Los Angeles-area studio with producer Howard Benson. Frontman Phil Labonte stated about the follow-up to 2015's The Order of Things: "The disc we are working on right now is going to blow people's minds. It's gonna challenge you. There are songs like nothing we've ever done before." The new album, was officially titled Madness, and two singles, the title track and "Safe House," were released on February 3. The full album was then released on April 28, 2017. The album debuted at number 50 on the Billboard 200 and became the band's second to top the US Top Hard Rock Albums Billboard. Once again, the album was met with mixed reviews from critics, not being seen as a metal album at all. The band made several festival appearances in support of the album during the spring of 2017, and toured North America with Alter Bridge towards the end of the year.

=== Victim of the New Disease and Oli Herbert's death (2018–2021) ===
On September 14, 2018, the band released a new song titled "Fuck Love" from their upcoming studio album set for release in early 2019. The first single from the album was "Fuck Love". It was first posted to lead singer Phil Labonte's Instagram page as a cryptographic binary code leading to an unlisted YouTube video. On September 26, the band released an image of the cover art to their social media pages, revealing the title of the new record to be Victim of the New Disease. On September 27, 2018, the band announced a release date of November 9. The album received critical acclaim from music critics, with praise being directed at a perceived return to creative and musical form as well as the return to their heavier metalcore sound.

On October 17, 2018, the band revealed through their Facebook page that lead guitarist and founding member Oli Herbert had died at the age of 44. On Facebook, his wife claimed to have received the toxicology report, which indicated that the cause of his death was drowning after taking antidepressants and sleeping aids, neither of which were prescribed. However, it has been reported that police are looking into his death and that it was possibly the result of foul play. The Facebook post has since been deleted. The investigation is ongoing. Investigators noted that Herbert's will was changed a week prior to his death, which made his wife the sole benefactor. The band released a statement stating “We were devastated to learn that Oli Herbert, our friend, guitar player, and founding member of All That Remains, has passed away. Oli was an incredibly talented guitarist and song writer who defined Rock and Metal from the Northeast. His impact on the genres and our lives will continue indefinitely.”

Labonte originally questioned if the band would be able to continue following Herbert's death due to him being such a big part since its inception. He then later stated that "Oli would’ve wanted the band carry on." "We’re going to go out and do as much as we can to get in front of as many people as possible and play these songs for Oli because that's what he would've wanted us to do."

On November 9, 2018, Labonte revealed in an interview that Jason Richardson (formerly of Chelsea Grin and Born of Osiris) would be filling in as lead guitarist for their upcoming tours. On February 5, 2019, the band confirmed that Richardson would be joining the band as an official member via their Facebook page.

In a December 30, 2019 interview with Alternative Press Labonte stated that the band did not want to insult Herbert’s memory when picking a new guitarist:

We didn’t wanna get someone that was gonna try to be Oli, Oli was Oli — the way he wrote his riffs, his personality. We didn’t want someone that had his look either. We wouldn’t have turned someone down that had long hair and a beard, but we weren’t, like, ‘You’ve gotta have a beard and long hair.’ We weren’t looking to do that. The last thing we wanted was people to feel like we were trying to get a guy to be Oli. Oli was Oli, and no one will ever be Oli again.

In early 2019 they toured in support of the album alongside Unearth and Attila. In late 2019 All That Remains went on the “Disease Of The Anima” alongside Lacuna Coil, the tour name was a combination of both bands new albums.

=== Further lineup changes and Antifragile (2022–present) ===
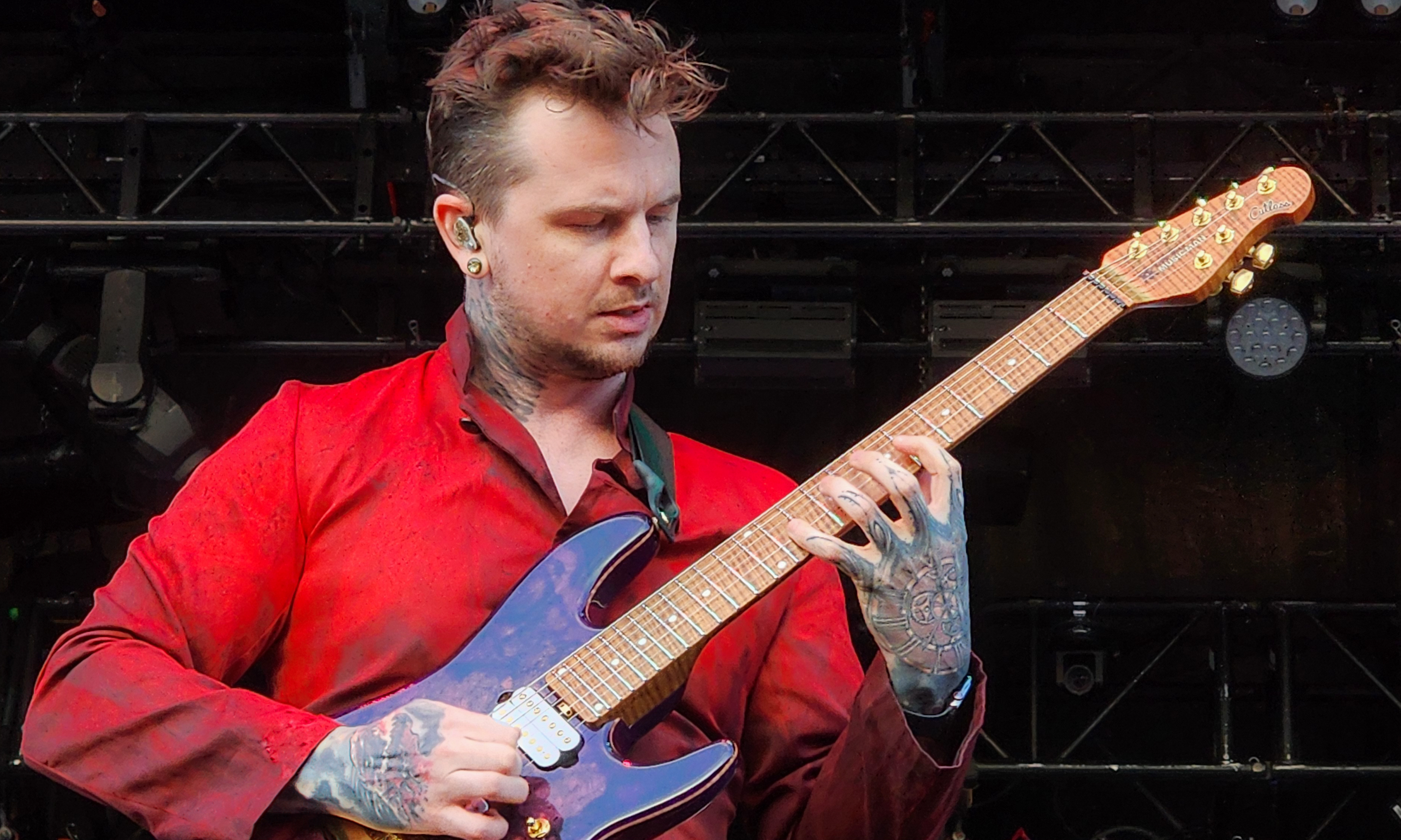
Jason Richardson performing live in 2023

On February 2, 2022, it was announced that former bassist Matt Deis had rejoined the band, replacing Aaron Patrick who left to focus on his other band, Bury Your Dead. On April 11, 2022, the band released a 15-minute documentary looking back on impact of their album The Fall of Ideals. They also embarked on a 15th-anniversary tour for the album in the Spring with Miss May I, Varials, and Tallah serving as support.

In January 2023 All That Remains sued Elizabeth Herbert the former wife of Oli Herbert for blocked royalty payments to the group. On July 20, 2023, it was announced drummer Jason Costa had left the band for personal reasons. Following Costa's departure, Anthony Barone of Canadian death metal band Beneath the Massacre (and formerly of Shadow of Intent and A Night in Texas) took over as All That Remains' touring drummer.

On May 3, 2024, the single "Divine" was released in advance of the band's next studio album; it is the band's first song to feature Richardson on lead guitar and Barone on drums. The single marked All That Remains first independent release on their own label, following their departure from Razor & Tie who had released all their previous material. A month later, the band would release the single "Let You Go" on June 14. From August 2, 2024, to September 28, All That Remains went on a U.S. tour as the supporting act alongside Mudvayne and Megadeth.

On August 16, 2024, the band released the third single "No Tomorrow" off their upcoming album. On November 7, 2024, the fourth single "Forever Cold" was released along with a lyric video. On December 6, 2024, it was announced that All That Remains would release their new album Antifragile on January 31, 2025. The album was met with positive reviews, overall being seen as a good comeback for the band with all the line up changes they had faced. On May 31, the band featured on a song with metal YouTuber Nik Nocturnal. On July 29, 2025, the band and Richardson announced that they would be parting ways while Richardson "focuses on his own projects".

In December 2025, All That Remains announced that they would be embarking on a U.S. headlining tour in April and May 2026 with Born Of Osiris and Dead Eyes serving as support. On January 12, 2026, Ken Susi (formerly of Unearth and As I Lay Dying) was announced as the band's new guitarist. This tour will include an appearance at Welcome to Rockville, which will take place in Daytona Beach, Florida in May 2026. During the tour Emil Werstler filled in for guitarist Mike Martin. Allegaeon drummer Jeff Saltzman, filled in for Barone. During the bands performance at Warped Tour in Orlando, Nick Pierce (formerly of Unearth) filled in on drums for Barone.

== Musical style and influences ==
=== Musical style ===
All That Remains has been described as metalcore, melodic metalcore, melodic death metal, hard rock, and heavy metal. The band's music mixes "crushing" riffs, dual guitar harmonies, double bass drum patterns, and breakdowns that are prevalent in the metalcore genre. Vocally, the band combines singing, screaming, and growls. Phil Labonte's lyrics focus on themes such as relationships, personal struggles, society, and hope. In a 2012 interview he stated that he intentionally keeps his lyrics somewhat vague, inviting listeners to interpret them through their own lens. Around the time of the release of their album A War You Cannot Win Labonte started writing more lyrics that reflected his own life and vulnerability, crediting Sarah McLachlan as an influence in his decision. In an interview with Blabbermouth.net Labonte stated:

When you write songs about your own personal vulnerability, there are people that are going to attack you for it and call you names and mock you. But It's worked out well for us, though, so it doesn't matter much. If people don't like the song 'What If I Was Nothing' or people don't like the lyrics – tough guys don't like it – tough shit, because there's a lot of people that do. It's never been something that I've been apprehensive about, thankfully.

Labonte described the band as "modern metal" for their solos, harmonies, and breakdowns. On the metalcore label, he noted Hatebreed and said they sound "nothing alike". Guitarist Mike Martin said "we're not Christian and we're not metalcore, so tell the people on the message board to stop calling us that."

In an interview with Crypticrock, Mike Martin stated about their musical style:

We've always wanted to have a lot of different kind of metal songs whether it was a ballad, fast song, or death metal song. We've always been capable of doing every kind of song. We've always just done it no matter what the repercussions were because you know you are always going to get backlash. If you are going to write a record that is really heavy, and on the next record you have a ballad, people are going to get pissed. We never really look too much into it, we just wanted to do it, and so we pretty much did it."

Over the course of the band’s career, their sound has greatly shifted, with their first album Behind Silence and Solitude featuring a melodic death metal sound, while the follow up This Darkened Heart began to shift to their signature metalcore sound. The next big change came with A War You Cannot Win, which saw the band move away from their heavier metallic sound in favor of a more hard rock direction, incorporating stronger harmonies and more clean singing. With Victim of the New Disease, the band went back to their traditional heavier metalcore sound.

=== Influences ===
The band's influences include In Flames, Metallica, Megadeth, Slayer, King Diamond, Pantera, Iron Maiden, Hatebreed, Killswitch Engage, Arch Enemy, Cannibal Corpse, Carcass, and Grave.

Oli Herbert had stated his biggest influence on guitar was Andy LaRocque of King Diamond. He has also mentioned that he draws much influence from George Lynch, John Sykes, and Randy Rhoads.

Mike Martin's influences include '80s hair bands like Skid Row, and Poison, which he credited for making him want to join a band when he was younger before he began to be influenced by metal acts. Another one of his personal influences is John Mayer.

Phil Labonte has mentioned his influences range from Cannibal Corpse, Carcass, Grave, Metallica, Iron Maiden, Pantera, and 1980s glam metal bands. In an interview, Labonte stated:

I fell in love with the whole glam world. And then I like death metal too, Cannibal Corpse…it's very wide range of what people like, you know, Justin Timberlake…all that stuff."

He also is known for being a huge fan of non-metal acts such as Sarah McLachlan, Garth Brooks, Carrie Underwood, Taylor Swift, Carly Rae Jepsen, and Skrillex. In an interview with Blabbermouth.net, Labonte stated:

It's well documented that we like cheesy pop music. There's pictures of me wearing Fall Out Boy shirts! I listen to Prince, and everyone knows that Mike and I love Nickelback, and everyone is always listening to Dr. Dre, or Snoop Dogg, or Eminem, or Jay-Z, or just pop music! That song Fergilicious is the new "hit" for All That Remains, it's the song we want to hear. Just a lot of garbage pop. It's kind of a joke because it's the stuff we like, and it's the stuff we want to hear, but we play it for everybody. So, it probably does come through, and it's something that we're aware of, and we're cool with it. If we can make songs that make sense as metal songs, and All That Remains songs, so why not let your influences come into it, just so long as it doesn't get hokey, or it doesn't hurt the song. You don't want to make a song "do something," you kind of want to let it go its own way. If it fits and works, then it fits and works, and if it doesn't work, you can't make it work or force it to work. We just go with what we think sounds good, and what feels right to us."

== Legacy ==
All That Remains has sold over 1 million records worldwide and has been considered a notable act within the new wave of American heavy metal. The group are also viewed as a prominent band in the metalcore genre, with their album The Fall of Ideals being celebrated as a metalcore classic and a genre defining album. Loudwire stated "It’s an album that helped more people take metalcore seriously as a genre, and bridge the worlds between metal’s more extreme and accessible ends of the spectrum." Tim Peacock of Udiscover Music wrote that the band has "built an undeniable legacy upheld by airtight songcraft, knifepoint precise metallic instrumentations, and stadium-size hard rock hooks. Standing tall as one of this century’s most consistent purveyors of heavy music with a bulletproof canon of arena-worthy anthems." In 2014 OC Weekly ranked them 7th on their list of the top 10 best metalcore bands, similarly Ultimate Guitar put them at 10th on their list stating "In the pre-"Overcome" era, All That Remains were a defining early metalcore act."

== Band members ==
Current

- Philip Labonte – lead vocals (1998–present)
- Mike Martin – rhythm guitar (2002–present)
- Matt Deis – bass (2003–2005, 2022–present); piano (2003–2005); backing vocals (2022–present)
- Anthony Barone – drums (2024–present)
- Ken Susi – lead guitar (2026–present)

Former

- Oli Herbert – rhythm guitar (1998–2002); lead guitar (2002–2018; his death)
- Dan Egan – bass (1998–2002)
- Chris Bartlett – lead guitar (1998–2002)
- Michael Bartlett – drums (1998–2005)
- Shannon Lucas – drums (2005–2006)
- Josh Venn – bass, backing vocals (2005)
- Jeanne Sagan – bass, backing vocals (2005–2015)
- Jason Costa – drums (2006–2023)
- Aaron Patrick – bass, backing vocals (2015–2021)
- Jason Richardson – lead guitar, keyboards, programming (2018–2025)

Touring/Live

- Tim Yeung – drums (2006)
- Mike Caputo – drums (2024)
- Jeff Saltzman – drums (2026)
- Emil Werstler – guitar (2026)
- Nick Pierce - drums (2026)

Timeline

== Discography ==
Studio albums

- Behind Silence and Solitude (2002)
- This Darkened Heart (2004)
- The Fall of Ideals (2006)
- Overcome (2008)
- For We Are Many (2010)
- A War You Cannot Win (2012)
- The Order of Things (2015)
- Madness (2017)
- Victim of the New Disease (2018)
- Antifragile (2025)

== Awards and nominations ==
Boston Music Awards

| Year | Nominee / work | Award | Result |
|---|---|---|---|
| 2007 | All That Remains | Outstanding Metal/Hardcore band of the Year | Nominated |

Metal Hammer Golden Gods Awards

| Year | Nominee / work | Award | Result |
|---|---|---|---|
| 2009 | All That Remains | Break Through Act of the Year | Nominated |

Independent Music Awards

| Year | Nominee / work | Award | Result |
|---|---|---|---|
| 2010 | Overcome | Best Hard Rock/Metal Album | Won |

Metal Storm Awards

| Year | Nominee / work | Award | Result |
|---|---|---|---|
| 2010 | For We Are Many | The Best Hardcore / Metalcore / Deathcore Album | Nominated |

NikNocturnal awards

| Year | Nominee / work | Award | Result |
|---|---|---|---|
| 2024 | Jason Richardson | Guitarist of the Year | Won |
| 2024 | "Dievine" | Song of the Year | Nominated |
| 2024 | Anthony Barone | Drummer of the Year | Nominated |
