= Philip Labonte =

American singer (born 1975)

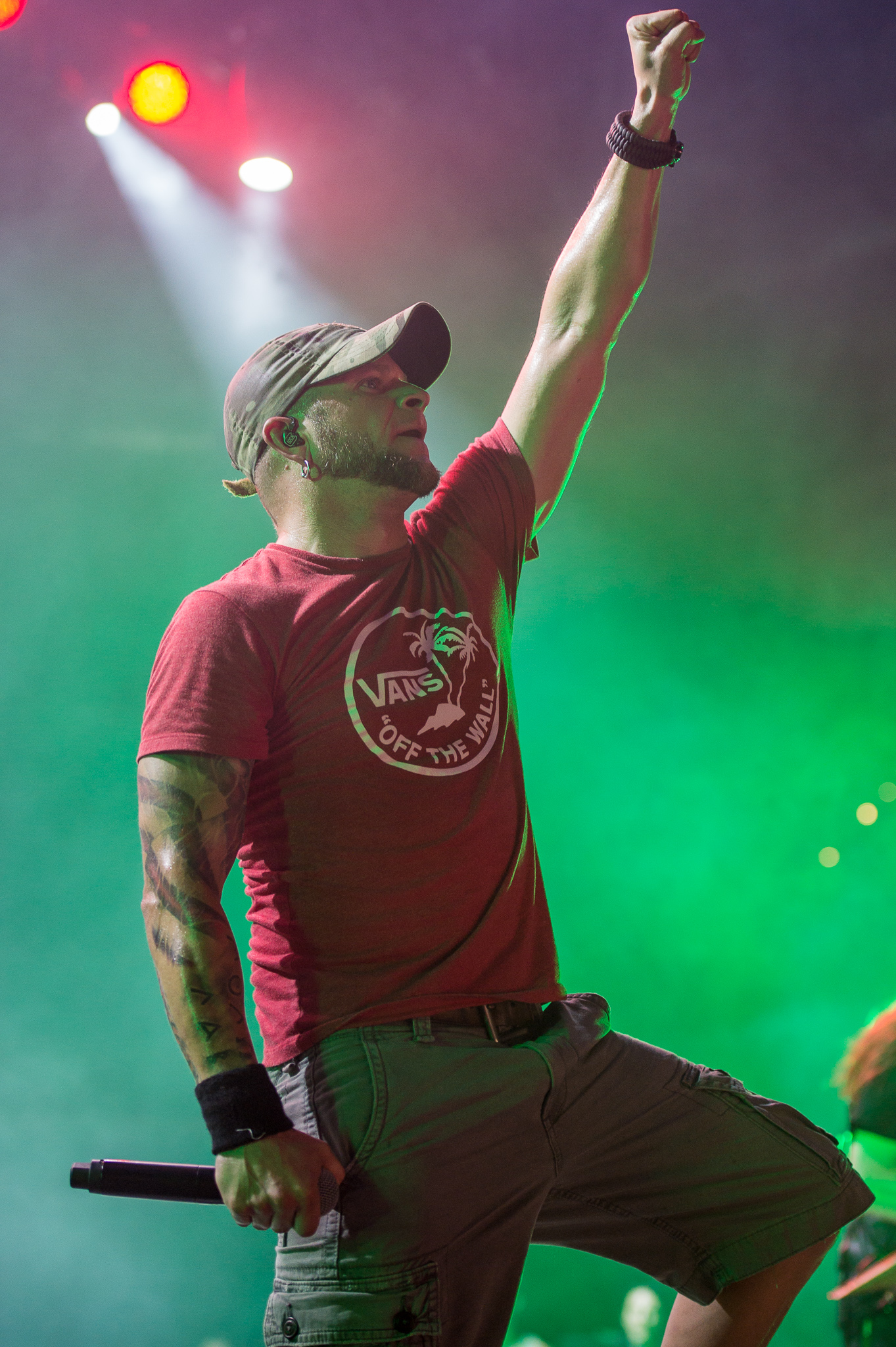
- Labonte performing at Rock im Park in 2015

Background information
- Born: Philip Steven Labonte; April 15, 1975 (age 51)
- Origin: Chicopee, Massachusetts, U.S.
- Genres: Melodic metalcore; hard rock; heavy metal; death metal; melodic death metal (early)
- Occupations: Singer; Guitarist; songwriter
- Years active: 1993, 1994–present
- Member of: All That Remains; Perpetual Doom
- Formerly of: Shadows Fall

Philip Steven Labonte (born April 15, 1975) is an American singer, best known as the lead singer of the heavy metal band All That Remains. He is the former lead vocalist for Shadows Fall and filled in for Killswitch Engage in early 2010, as well as for Five Finger Death Punch in late 2016.

== Early life ==
Labonte was born on April 15th, 1975 in Chicopee, Massachusetts. He grew up in a military family; his father served in the U.S Air Force, his uncle served in the military, and both of his grandfathers served in World War II. In his youth, he would listen to hits from the 1950s and 1960s while he sat in the back of his parents’ car. As a teenager, he started to become a fan of brutal death metal, listening to bands like Cannibal Corpse, Exhumed and Gorguts.

== Career ==
=== Early career/Shadows Fall ===
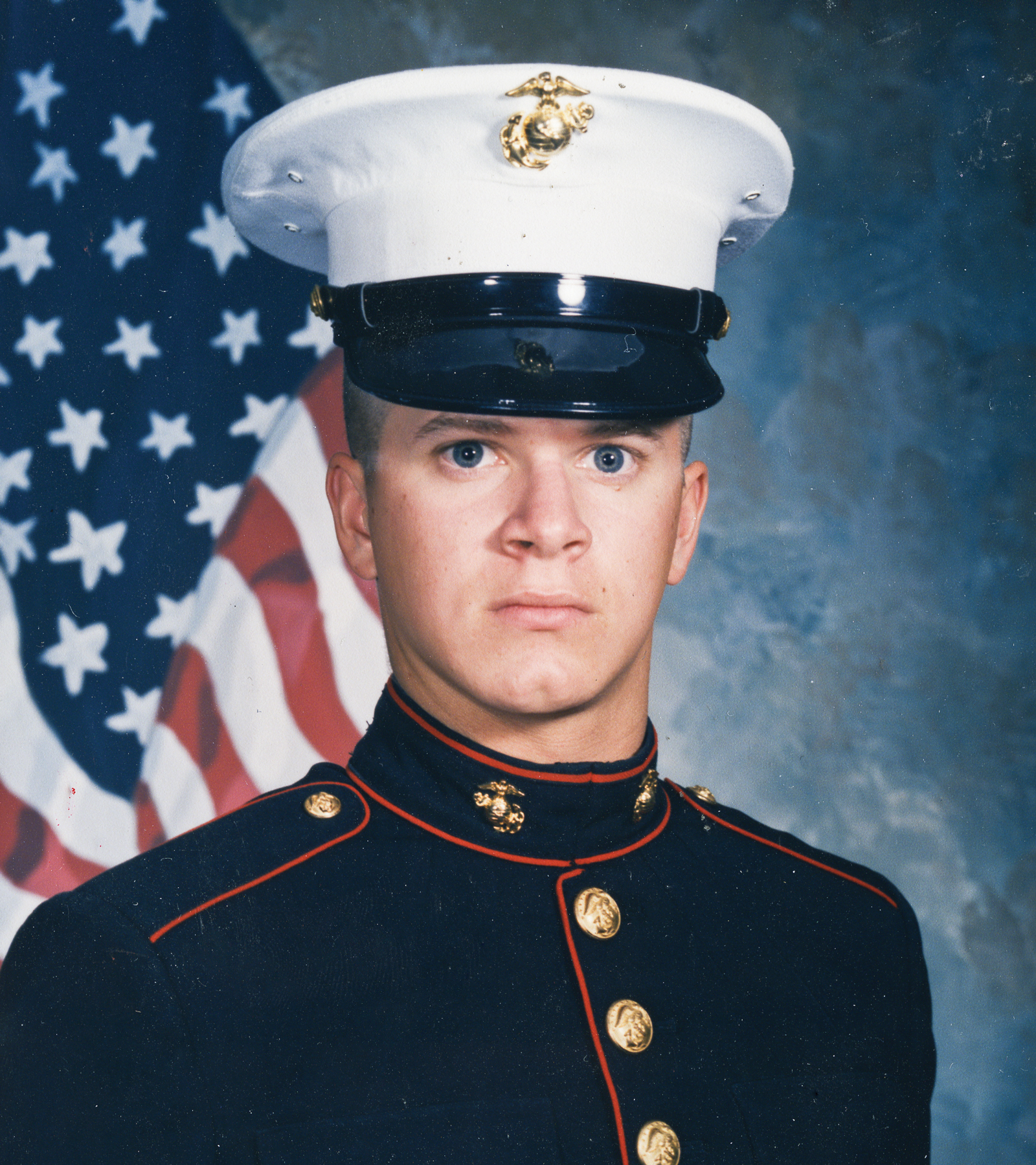
Labonte while a US Marine

In the mid-1990s, Labonte was in a death metal band called Perpetual Doom, with its members being teenagers at the time. He originally played guitar and provided backing vocals, however the original vocalist of Perpetual Doom was Scott Estes; Labonte, however, took over the vocal position in 1993 after Estes joined the United States Marine Corps (USMC), with Labonte also playing the guitar. In August 1993, Labonte left to join the USMC and Perpetual Doom remained inactive for nine months in his absence. After finishing basic training, he moved on to combat training, where he sustained a serious injury to his ankle that stopped his training. This led to his commanding officer sending him home with an honorary discharge. Upon Labonte's return to Massachusetts in June 1994, Perpetual Doom resumed making music, and in 1995 they recorded and released a seven-track demo called "Sorrow's End". Other band members included Ken Robert (vocals, guitar), Bill Brault (bass), and Stephen "Steve" Gonsalves (drums), who went on to become a paranormal investigator and future cast member of Ghost Hunters.

Labonte left Perpetual Doom to join the melodic death metal band Shadows Fall. His new bandmates asked him to refrain from playing guitar, but he served as Shadows Fall's lead vocalist from 1996 to 1998. The band's debut record, Somber Eyes to the Sky, was released in 1997 through Lifeless Records, a label owned by Shadows Fall guitarist Matt Bachand. Labonte was asked to leave Shadows Fall due to "musical differences" and was replaced with current vocalist Brian Fair, leaving Somber Eyes to the Sky as the only Shadows Fall record with Labonte on vocals.

In a 2007 interview, Labonte commented on his departure from the band:

"What happened was Brian [Fair], who is their current singer, the band that he was in broke up. [...] I didn't sound like Brian, and when he became available, they were like, 'Look, we want to get another singer. We want to get Brian.' I was like, 'Okay. Cool.' There's no hard feelings or anything like that 'cause I knew it was the dude they had in mind in the first place and also I had already started writing stuff for All That Remains."

=== All That Remains ===
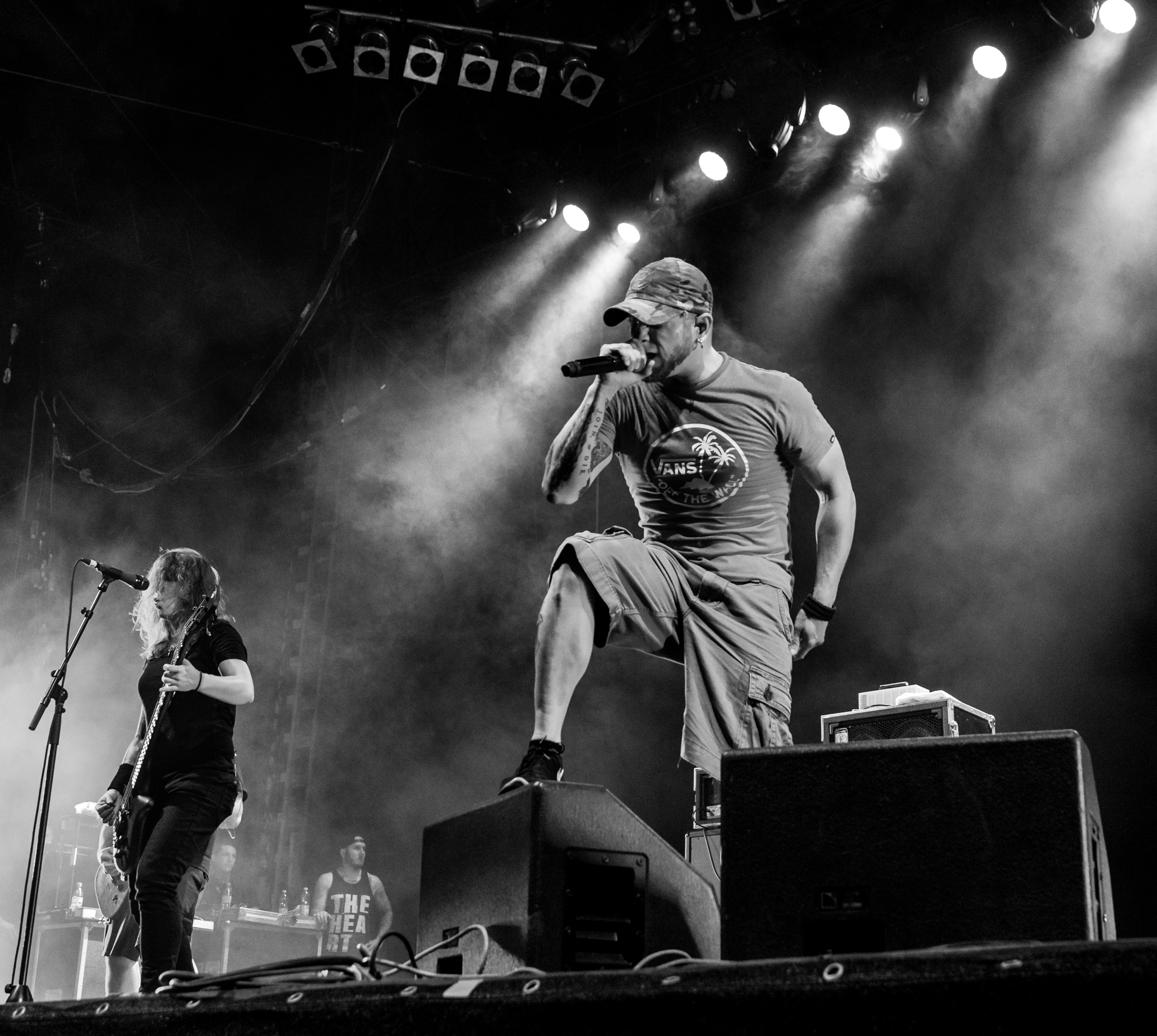
Labonte performing with All That Remains in 2015

In 1998, Labonte formed All That Remains as a side project. After he left Shadows Fall, All That Remains became his main priority. Labonte has been the vocalist of All That Remains for its entire run. Their debut record, Behind Silence and Solitude, was released in 2002 through Prosthetic Records/Razor & Tie. This was then followed by 2004's This Darkened Heart, which saw the band move more towards a metalcore sound with some clean vocals from Labonte.

The band's big break came with their 3rd album, The Fall of Ideals, which was released in 2006 and became their first to chart on the Billboard 200 at number 75. The album is celebrated as a metalcore classic and a breakthrough album. In a 2021 interview with Revolver, Labonte revealed that the album's lyrics were more uplifting/optimistic due to him being in a positive spot in his life while writing them, stating "I felt like I had a lot of things to say and a lot of stuff I wanted to get across to people and I was in a really really good spot in my life. And I felt things were so optimistic and we were very excited."

Their 4th studio album, Overcome, kept the success going and took home Best Hard Rock/Metal album at the 2010 Independent Music Awards. That same year, the 5th studio album, For We Are Many, was released, which became their most successful commercially, peaking at number 10 on the Billboard 200.

In March 2011, Labonte was interviewed by CNN to discuss his experiences during the 2011 earthquake in Japan. All That Remains were soundchecking for a performance in Tokyo when the earthquake struck, with Labonte not realizing the severity of the situation until their booking agent evacuated them. After the building's structural integrity was examined by authorities, the band was allowed to return to the venue.

They then released A War You Cannot Win in 2012. During this time, Labonte started writing more lyrics that reflected his own life and vulnerability, crediting Sarah McLachlan as an influence in his decision. He stated "When you write songs about your own personal vulnerability, there are people that are going to attack you for it and call you names and mock you. But it's worked out well for us, though, so it doesn't much matter." Their 7th album, The Order of Things, was released in 2015 and was the first time someone besides Labonte had an input on the lyrics, as producer Josh Wilbur worked alongside him. Their 8th album, Madness, was released in 2017. One year later, they released Victim of The New Disease, which saw the group return to their heavier sound after the previous three records were more hard rock/radio friendly. Labonte stated "In my opinion, the last really heavy record we had done was probably 2010's 'For We Are Many'. It had been a while since we really kind of focused on writing heavy stuff, so we said, 'Let's put out a record that's mostly heavy.'" Lyrics for the album were heavily inspired Labonte's recent divorce.

Labonte and the band then faced some adversity throughout the next few years, including the death of the band’s guitarist, Oli Hebert. Labonte originally wondered if the band could go on without him but later decided the band would continue, stating "Oli would have wanted us to." After 6 years and almost an entirely new lineup, the band released their 10th album, Antifragile, on January 31, 2025. Labonte also made the decision to part ways with the bands record label, with him emphasizing a desire to "own their art outright and avoid being constrained by label expectations."

=== Other appearances ===
In 2010, Labonte filled in as Killswitch Engage's vocalist during the band's tour with The Devil Wears Prada and Dark Tranquillity, replacing lead singer Howard Jones. In 2012, due to Labonte's history with the band, rumors began circulating that he would officially take over lead vocals following Jones' departure, although he quickly dispelled the rumor.

In 2016 and parts of 2017, Labonte filled in as the frontman for Five Finger Death Punch after lead singer Ivan Moody stepped away to deal with personal problems. In 2023, alongside Howard Jones, he filled in for them again during a show in California.

In 2020, Labonte reunited with Perpetual Doom to release a re-recording of their song "Apt. 213".

== Influences and style ==
Labonte has cited Cannibal Corpse, Carcass, Grave, Metallica, Iron Maiden, Pantera, and many 1980s hair metal bands as influences. He has expressed fondness of artists both within and outside the heavy metal genre, stating "I fell in love with the whole glam world. And then like death metal too, Cannibal Corpse ... it's very wide range of what people like, you know, Justin Timberlake ... all that stuff." Other non-metal influences he has cited include Sarah McLachlan, Garth Brooks, Snoop Dogg, Eminem, Dr. Dre, Taylor Swift, Carly Rae Jepsen, Fall Out Boy, and Skrillex.

Labonte's lyrics touch upon subjects such as relationships, personal struggles, society, and hope, with him stating that he writes his best stuff when he’s miserable. He has stated that he intentionally keeps his lyrics somewhat vague, inviting listeners to interpret them through their own lens.

== Personal life ==
In 2021, during his appearance on Jamey Jasta's podcast, Labonte revealed that following his divorce in 2017, he quit drinking: "I don't know if I qualify as sober, because I haven't through AA [sic]; I just stopped drinking. I stopped because I got divorced and I hit a really low place. It was back in 2017, and it was January. And I'm, like, 'If I keep drinking, I'm probably gonna drink myself to death. So I've gotta put the bottle down.' And I just stopped. So I don't have a really good story or anything. I just was scared to die."

Labonte is an avid gym goer and promotes living a healthy lifestyle. He also trains Brazilian jiu jitsu.

In 2012, Labonte visited service members aboard a Marine Corps base in Lejeune.

Labonte has a son that was born in October of 2025.

=== Political views ===
Labonte has stated that he is a libertarian. He expressed his support for gun rights, cannabis legalization and criminal justice reform. He has also advocated cutting the size of the military and was critical of U.S. intervention overseas and military bases in the Middle East; he stated: "You can be pro-military and not be pro-imperialism. You can be pro-military and pro-national events and still think that we have too many bases in foreign countries that we just don't need." Labonte moved to New Hampshire to join the libertarian movement taking place in the state.

He supported Republican presidential candidates Ron Paul in 2012, and Rand Paul in 2016. In 2020, he supported Libertarian nominee Jo Jorgensen for the presidential election, while also expressing his detest for the party's leadership.

In 2023, Labonte became a regular recurring guest on Tim Pool's nightly political podcast, Timcast IRL.

In 2018, Labonte said that he was an atheist, but has since stated in tweets and Timcast IRL that he is an agnostic.

Labonte has been vocal about his support for Donald Trump towards the 2024 United States presidential election. In response to photos taken of the attempted assassination of Donald Trump, Labonte tweeted, "FUCK YES! put this man in office and DESTROY THE LEFT."

Labonte has openly expressed anti-feminist beliefs.

== Discography ==
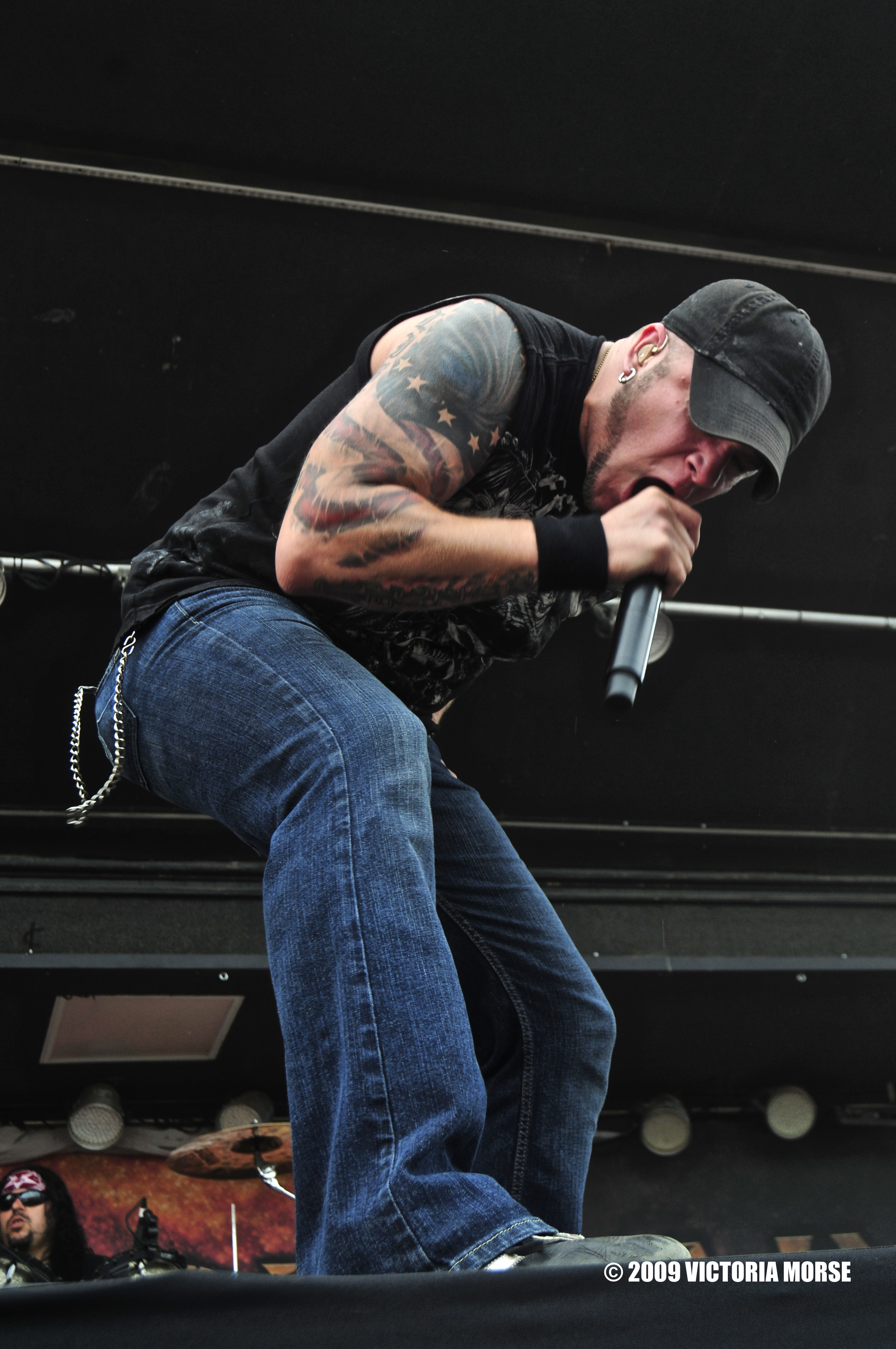
Labonte in 2009

=== With Perpetual Doom ===
- Sorrow's End (Demo) (1995)
- Apartment 213 (Single) (2020)

=== With Shadows Fall ===
- To Ashes (EP) (1997)
- Somber Eyes to the Sky (1997)

=== All That Remains ===
- Behind Silence and Solitude (2002)
- This Darkened Heart (2004)
- The Fall of Ideals (2006)
- Overcome (2008)
- For We Are Many (2010)
- A War You Cannot Win (2012)
- The Order of Things (2015)
- Madness (2017)
- Victim of the New Disease (2018)
- Antifragile (2025)

=== Guest appearances ===
- Killswitch Engage – "Self Revolution", "To the Sons of Man", "Hope Is...", "Irreversal (re-recorded)"
- Ligeia – "Makin' Love to a Murderer"
- Flatlined – "Parallel Reflections"
- The Autumn Offering – "Homecoming"
- The Acacia Strain – "Predator; Never Prey"
- Tarja Turunen – "Dark Star"
- Unearth – "Grave of Opportunity" (music video)
- Timcast – "Coming Home"
- Jasta – "Something You Should Know"
- Nik Nocturnal – "Scarlet"
- Zillion — “Cannibals”
