= Spirit (EP) =

EP by This Condition
- Released: July 27, 2010 (US)
- Recorded: April 2010 at The Pilot Studio in Boonton, NJ
- Genre: Pop rock
- Producer: Rob Freeman

This Condition chronology
We Don't Have to Be Alone (2008)	Spirit (2010)	Sessions (2013)

Spirit is This Condition's third EP, a five-track album recorded in April 2010. It was released on July 27, 2010 through online retailers and digital music stores (iTunes), as well as a physical release through the band's online merchandise store. Recorded in Boonton, NJ's The Pilot Studio with producer Rob Freeman, whom the band had worked with on three singles in 2009, the album features five new tracks, including "Go" and "Stay Right Here".

== Tracks ==
1. "Stay Right Here" – 3:43
2. "Lost" – 3:47
3. "She Loves Me" – 3:25
4. "Go" – 3:56
5. "I Think I Like You" – 3:21

== Personnel ==
=== Band members ===
- Nathen Cyphert – Vocals, acoustic guitar
- Mike McGovern – Guitar, mandolin
- Nick Cantatore – Bass
- Devin Passariello – Drums
- Stephen Conley – Guitar, backing vocals

=== Production ===
- Produced and Mixed by Rob Freeman
- Mastered by Mike Fossenkemper

=== Additional Performers ===
- Trumpet on 'I Think I Like You' performed by Andrew Cramb

All songs written and performed by This Condition
