= Keenwild =

American musical duo

- Origin: Temecula, California, U.S.
- Genres: Indie; Acoustic; Pop; Folk
- Years active: 2002 to present
- Labels: Full Value Entertainment; Local Punks Records
- Members: Jeney Kingsbury, Bill Gould, Jason Walker
- Past members: Devin Sanchez, Kravvy, Artistic Propaganda
- Website: http://www.keenwild.com

Keenwild is a band formed by Jeney Kingsbury and Bill Gould, in late 2002, that has released multiple studio albums and performed at many venues across the western United States. Keenwild is based in Temecula California.

== Group formation ==
Keenwild formed from Superdank, a band featuring Jason Walker on guitar, that broke up in early 2002. Their final show, played in Hemet, California at The Wheelhouse, had Bill Gould singing as he fell off the stage into the crowd. Walker went on to play guitar in the Heavy Metal band Serpent Underground after leaving Superdank. Gould had been writing songs that were not at all in the style of Superdank in the spring of 2002.

When he met Kingsbury in late 2001 through a message board on the website of now defunct radio station 92.1 in San Diego, the two became friends. On the way home from a Superdank show in February 2002 at Brick by Brick in San Diego, Gould heard Kingsbury singing to the radio in the back seat and knew he had found the new lead singer for his untitled new project.

== Finding a name ==
After beginning to write new songs together, the duo knew that the name Superdank was not the correct one for this new and different project. While driving to one of Gould's favorite hiking locations in Idyllwild, California, the pair were writing down random ideas when they drove past an area of the forest named 'Keenwild' and wrote down that name as well and eventually chose it.

== Success ==
In late 2004, the Keenwild song "Mr Pete" went to number one on the Australian MP3.com.au chart. The song "Rivers" made it to the top 10 in the spring of 2005. Keenwild enjoyed playing the grand opening of the Temecula Dippin' Dots store that was headlined by A Change Of Pace, during the show Gould played with a broken hand until his cast broke all of the strings making it impossible to perform further.

The band, thru extensive touring, has played venues such as Modified Arts, The Electric Theater (St. George, Utah), Ridglea Theater (Fort Worth, Texas), Java Joz (Murrieta, California), Madlins (Temecula, Ca), Temecula CRC (Temecula, Ca), Water Canyon Coffee (Yucca, Ca), Beatnik Cafe (Joshua Tree, Ca), Zia Records (Tempe, Az), Santa Fe Cafe (Fullerton, Ca) The Dirt (Las Cruces, Nm) and The Boondocks (Cedar City, Ut).

In early 2005, Keenwild played a sold out show in St George, Utah, at the Electric Theater with bands A Thorn For Every Heart and Brown Eyed Deception, the latter of whom changed their name to YouInSeries after this show. Keenwild have played shows with well-known bands such as Neon Trees, Meg and Dia, HelloGoodbye, Steel Train, Inverse, A Change Of Pace, YouInSeries, D.O.R.K./Animo, Halifax, Socratic, An Angle and Limbeck.

The band has also played events like Temecula Arts Festival, Earth Day at Lake Skinner, Idyllwild Strong Festival, Temecula Bluegrass Festival, Temecula Rod Run, Redlands Race for the Cure, Temecula Tractor Race, Think Pink - a Breast Cancer Benefit, and the Temecula Music Fest.

In 2014, Keenwild was nominated for two Temecula Valley Music Awards and won the award for Viewers Choice, for the song "Seventeen".

At the start of Keenwild's set at the 2011 Temecula Music Fest, Bill told the crowd to register to vote (and actually vote), volunteer in the community and help lead the country; before declaring his freedom from the confines of being an elected official and tearing into an unedited version of the Keenwild hit "Mr Pete". This was the first time in over four years that Keenwild had played the song live.

After almost ten years since their last album was released, a new album Sunsets was released in January 2015 on iTunes, Spotify, Amazon Music and other digital outlets.

Keenwild got second place in the 2017 Radio 94.5 Rising Stars competition and was interviewed by longtime radio DJ Dwight Arnold.

The band released the EP 'Fate' in 2018 and won the Radio 94.5 Rising Stars competition in May 2019 landing them a spot on the Temecula Valley Balloon and Wine Festival in June 2019.

January 2020 saw the release of the album Sunrise, featuring songs The Huntress, We Will Win (if you're choosing sides) and Vicious.

In October 2020, Keenwild released a 3 song EP 'Make Me Feel' in conjunction with visual artist Serrated Banana.

May 2023 saw the release of the single 'Summer Nights' after multi-instrumentalist Jason Walker had re-joined the band.

== Other interests ==
Bill and Jeney began promoting shows in the Temecula area in 2004 at various local venues as a way to entertain high school kids.

After the success in hosting live music and playing shows across the country with Keenwild, Gould decided to run for elected office in the fall of 2007. In his first campaign and running against a former District Trustee, Bill won the election and was one the Romoland School Board as a Trustee until 2011.

The fall of 2010 found Jeney Kingsbury being elected to the Board of Directors of the Temecula Arts Council. Jeney served as the Secretary on the Executive Board.

On July 1, 2011, after four years as a Trustee, Bill Gould stepped down as a Board Member of the Romoland School District. Bill cited 'personal reasons' as his reason for resigning, fueling speculation of him seeking higher office in 2012. The official reason given to the Press-Enterprise was to spend more time with the family.

In early 2011, Bill Gould and Jeney Kingsbury (Full Value Entertainment) sold the Temecula Music Fest to The Vault, a local Temecula concert producer. Bill and Jeney continued on as an important part of the event, Keenwild played the opening night. At the start of Keenwild's set at the 2011 Temecula Music Fest, Bill told the crowd to register to vote (and actually vote), volunteer in the community and help lead the country; before declaring his freedom from the confines of being an elected official and tearing into an unedited version of the Keenwild hit "Mr Pete". This was the first time in over four years that Keenwild had played the song live.

== Line-up ==
- Jeney Kingsbury: vocals, keyboards
- Bill Gould: guitar, bass, programming, synth
- Jason Walker: guitar, bass, percussion

== Other contributors ==
- Kravvy: vocals / rapper
- Apryl Gould: piano
- Alex Pappas: percussion
- Devin Sanchez: drums, percussion
- Artistic Propaganda: laptop production

== Discography ==
=== Studio albums ===
- Make Me Feel (2020)
- Sunrise (2020)
- Sunsets {remastered with bonus tracks} (2020)
- Fate (2018)
- Sunsets (2015)
- The Long Road Home (2005)
- Dievercity (2003)
