= Kings of Pop =

Studio album by Home Grown
- Released: June 25, 2002
- Studio: Big Fish; Sonik Wire
- Genre: Pop punk
- Length: 45:49
- Label: Drive-Thru
- Producer: Steve Evetts

Home Grown chronology
Connection (EP) (2000)	Kings of Pop (2002)	When It All Comes Down (2004)

Kings of Pop is the third and final album by the rock band Home Grown, released in 2002 by Drive-Thru Records. It was the band's first release with the drummer Darren Reynolds and its only release as a trio, having lost the second guitarist in 2000.

== Background and production ==
Home Grown released their second studio album Act Your Age in June 1998 through Outpost Recordings. Following this, the label folded and drummer Bob Herco had sustained a brain tumor; their line-up shifted a few times in the process. On June 13, 2001, the band signed to Drive-Thru Records. Following this, the band supported Reel Big Fish and Goldfinger on their co-headlining US tour in July and August 2001. Kings of Pop was recorded at Big Fish Studios in Encinitas, California, and Sonik Wire Studios in Irvine, California with producer and engineer Steve Evetts. He mixed the recordings at Jake's Place in Studio City, California. Steven Marcussen mastered the album at Marcussen Mastering in Hollywood, California.

== Release ==
On April 4, 2002, Kings of Pop was announced for release in two months' time and the album's track listing was revealed. Later in the month, the band performed at the Skate & Surf Festival. Kings of Pop was released on June 25, 2002, through Drive-Thru Records. Shortly after its release, however, Dan Hammond joined the band as its new second guitarist. Drummer Darren Reynolds said he was brought in to realize the songs in a live setting. He appears with the rest of the band in the music videos for the singles "You're Not Alone" and "Kiss Me, Diss Me". Between late June and mid-August, the band played on the Warped Tour, appearing on the Drive-Thru stage among their labelmates. Between September and November 2002, the band toured across the US with Mest and Catch 22. In April 2003, the band appeared at Skate and Surf Fest and played a handful of shows with Reel Big Fish and Los City Angels. Between late August and October 2003, the group performed on the Drive-Thru Records 2003 Invasion Tour. In January 2004, the band went on a tour of the UK, with Allister, the Early November and Hidden in Plain View. In March 2004, the band performed at the ExtremeThing festival. The band supported the album with several other tours. However, it proved to be their final album as the band went on "indefinite hiatus" in 2005 after releasing the EP When it All Comes Down.

The album contains three hidden tracks which appear after "Disaster" at 7:30 into track 12. They are a 9-second "techno song", a short rap about "Asian flavor" and a short acoustic "song for Steve". There was also a single released for "You're Not Alone" which contained the tracks "Break Me Down" and "Hope Sinks", which were B-sides from the album. Kings of Pop was released on clear vinyl by Drive-Thru Records, and was reissued in 2015 by Mutant League Records after being out of print for over a decade.

== Reception ==
Professional ratings
Review scores
Source	Rating
AllMusic	3/5 stars
Ink 19	Favorable
Ox-Fanzine	6/10
Rock Hard	6/10
Sputnikmusic	3.5/5

It was the band's most successful release, reaching number 189 on the Billboard 200 chart.

== Track listing ==
Track listing per booklet.

No.	Title	Writer(s)	Length
1.	"Tomorrow"	Adam Lohrbach	3:24
2.	"I Love You, Not"	John Tran	2:47
3.	"Give It Up"	Lohrbach	2:57
4.	"Kiss Me, Diss Me"	Tran	3:13
5.	"You're Not Alone"	Lohrbach	3:45
6.	"I'll Never Fall in Love"	Lohrbach	3:23
7.	"Second Best"	Tran	3:34
8.	"Why Won't You Leave Me?"	Tran	3:56
9.	"Cannot Stop the World"	Lohrbach	3:38
10.	"My Time Alone"	Tran	2:55
11.	"Waiting on Me"	Tran	3:32
12.	"Disaster" (includes untitled hidden tracks)	Lohrbach	8:45
Total length:			45:49

== Personnel ==
Personnel per booklet.

Home Grown

- Adam Lohrbach – bass guitar, vocals
- John "J. Trash" Tran – guitar, vocals
- Darren Reynolds – drums

Production and design

- Steve Evetts – producer, mixing, engineer
- Steven Marcussen – mastering
- Joshua M. Ortega – art direction, design
- Justin Stephens – photography

== Chart positions ==
Chart (2002)	Peak position
Billboard 200	200
