= The Inevitability of a Strange World =

Studio album by Halifax
- Released: May 23, 2006
- Studio: Carriage House (Stamford, Connecticut), The Machine Shop (Weehawken, New Jersey)
- Genre: Post-hardcore, pop punk
- Length: 49:24
- Label: Drive-Thru
- Producer: Lou Giordano, Machine

Halifax chronology
A Writer's Reference (2004)	The Inevitability of a Strange World (2006)

The Inevitability of a Strange World is Halifax's third release, issued on May 23, 2006, by Drive-Thru Records.

== Recording ==
Recording sessions were held at Carriage House Studios in Stamford, Connecticut, and The Machine Shop in Weehawken, New Jersey. Lou Giordano produced and mixed "Anthem for Tonight", "Snow on Hollywood", "Giant in the Ring", "Promise Me Tragedy", "A Tint of Rain", and "Murder I Wrote"; Todd Parker acted as engineer, with assistant engineer Derek Karlquist. Machine produced and engineered "Our Revolution", "Hey Italy", "Such a Terrible Trend", and "I Told You So"; they were engineered and edited by Chris Sasulo and Dan McLouglin, with assistance from Jim Feeney. Giordano also produced and engineered "Nightmare", "Under Fire", and "Better Than Sex", with additional production and mixing from Machine. The tracks were mixed at Black Dog Studios in Stamford, and at The Machine Shop, and were mastered by Ted Jensen at Sterling Sound.

Bassist Doug Peyton joined Halifax in-between the two recording sessions, hence singer Mike Hunau played bass on the Giordano-produced tracks. Guest musicians on the CD include guitarist Paul Nelson (performing a solo on "Anthem for Tonight") and Tourmaline's keyboardist Corey Zaloom.

== Release ==
On May 7, 2005, The Inevitability of a Strange World was announced for release in four months' time. Shortly after this, they embarked on a European tour throughout the month with Allister, I Am the Avalanche and Hidden in Plain View. Upon returning to the US, they toured across the country with From First to Last, Emanuel and He Is Legend, which lasted until mid-June. They closed out the month with a headlining tour, with support from Over It and A Thorn for Every Heart. Following this, they went on a tour of the Southern states with Hidden in Plain View and Spitalfield in September 2005. On February 7, 2006, a three-song sampler containing "Nightmare", "Under Fire", and "Anthem for Tonight" was made available for online purchase and at the band's concerts. Alongside this, Drive-Thru Records mentioned that they delayed the album at the band's request as the label was having issues with their distributor. Throughout the month, the band went on an East Coast tour with Paramore and So They Say. On March 21, the album was formally announced for release. On the same day, "Nightmare", "Anthem for Tonight" and "Under Fire" were made available for streaming. An e-card was posted shortly afterwards.

In April 2006, the band filmed a music video and "Our Revolution" was made available for streaming. Alongside this, they played a few shows with the Audition; the following month, they appeared at The Bamboozle festival. On May 19, 2006, the band released an acoustic version of "Such a Terrible Trend" via PureVolume. The Inevitability of a Strange World was made available for streaming on May 16, 2006, before being released seven days later through Drive-Thru. The album is named after a book Moberg was supposedly writing, in Hunter S. Thompson's novel 'The Rum Diary'. The album's cover and inlay artwork bears resemblance to that of Finch's Say Hello to Sunshine (2005), as both were created by Californian illustrator Jeff Soto. The Japanese version of the album, released on May 17, 2006, through In-n-Out Records, features a bonus track titled "Obsession". The song first appeared as "Because Pillows Are for Sleeping" in an interview with video podcasting group DMZ on December 10, 2005. They went on an East Coast tour with the Red Jumpsuit Apparatus and Aiden in May 2006. On May 27, 2006, the music video for "Our Revolution" was posted on the band's Myspace profile. Halifax supported Bayside on their US headlining tour until June 2006. Following this, they spent two weeks on that year's Warped Tour, appeared at Dirt Fest, and supported Sugarcult on their headlining US tour in September and October 2006. In November and December, the band supported Hoobastank on their tour of the U.S., as well as headlining a number of off-dates. "Our Revolution" was released to radio on June 13, 2006.

== Reception ==
Professional ratings
Review scores
Source	Rating
AbsolutePunk.net	81% link
Allmusic	link
Melodic	3.5/5 stars

The album had sold 34,795 copies as of October 2006, peaking at No. 130 on the Billboard 200 and at No. 1 on Billboard's Top Heatseekers chart.

== Track listing ==
All songs written by Halifax.

1. "Nightmare" – 3:52
2. "Our Revolution" – 3:08
3. "Under Fire" – 3:02
4. "Anthem for Tonight" – 3:44
5. "Hey Italy" – 3:14
6. "Snow in Hollywood" – 3:47
7. "Such a Terrible Trend" – 4:14
8. "Better Than Sex" – 3:48
9. "Giant in the Ring" – 3:51
10. "Promise Me Tragedy" – 3:15
11. "A Tint of Rain" – 4:04
12. "I Told You So" – 3:29
13. "Murder I Wrote" – 5:50
14. "Obsession" – 3:41 (Japanese bonus track)

=== B-Sides ===
1. "Box and Chains" – 3:50
2. "Disaster" – 4:02
3. "Nightingale" – 4:05

== Personnel ==
Personnel per booklet.

Halifax

- Michael J. Hunau – vocals
- Chris Brandt – guitar, vocals
- Adam Charles – guitar
- Thomas Guindon – drums
- Doug Peyton – bass

Additional musicians

- Paul Nelson – guitar (track 4)
- Jonothan Wesley Jones – piano (track 7), keyboards (track 13), arrangement (track 13)
- Corey Zaloom – keyboards (tracks 1, 6, 7, 11 and 13)

Production and design

- Lou Giordano – producer (tracks 1, 3, 4, 6, 8–11 and 13), mixing (tracks 4, 6, 9–11 and 13), engineer (tracks 1, 3 and 8)
- Todd Parker – engineer (tracks 4, 6, 9–11 and 13)
- Derek Karlquist – assistant engineer (tracks 4, 6, 9–11 and 13)
- Machine – producer (tracks 2, 5, 7 and 12), engineer (tracks 2, 5, 7 and 12), additional production (tracks 1, 3 and 8), mixing (tracks 1, 3 and 8)
- Chris Sasulo – engineer (tracks 2, 5, 7 and 12), editing (tracks 2, 5, 7 and 12)
- Dan McLouglin – engineer (tracks 2, 5, 7 and 12), editing (tracks 2, 5, 7 and 12)
- Jim Feeney – assistant engineer (tracks 2, 5, 7 and 12)
- Ted Jensen – mastering
- Jeff Soto – illustration
- Rob Gary – layout
- Dave Hill – band photo
