= Scott Murphy (musician) =

American musician and singer-songwriter (born 1979)

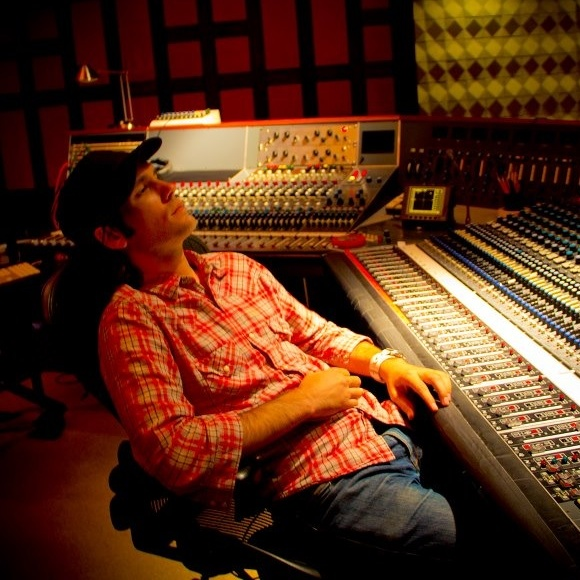
- Scott Murphy recording at NRG Studios in North Hollywood, CA, 2012

Background information
- Born: Scott Murphy; February 11, 1979 (age 46); Chicago, Illinois, U.S.
- Origin: Chicago, Illinois, U.S.
- Genres: Rock; pop rock; pop punk; power pop
- Occupations: Musician, singer-songwriter
- Instruments: Vocals, guitar, bass
- Years active: 1998–present
- Labels: Universal Music Japan - Universal J
- Website: scottmurphymusic.com

Scott Murphy (born February 11, 1979) is an American musician and singer-songwriter. He is best known for his work as bassist, vocalist, and songwriter in the pop punk band Allister, as well as his solo work released through Universal Music, and his collaboration with Weezer frontman and vocalist Rivers Cuomo through the name Scott & Rivers. Scott is also currently bassist/ vocalist for the Japanese band MONOEYES.

== Career ==
=== Allister ===
Scott Murphy began playing with pop punk band Allister on bass and vocals in 1998. They were one of the first bands to sign to California based record label Drive-Thru Records, and have released five studio albums — 1999's Dead Ends and Girlfriends, 2002's Last Stop Suburbia (which reached No. 9 on the Billboard Heatseekers chart.), 2005's Before the Blackout, 2010's Countdown to Nowhere, and 2012's "Life Behind Machines" — Allister also made a cameo appearance in the 2004 film Sleepover.

While on tour in Japan for the first time in 2001 for a string of sold-out shows, Murphy became intrigued by the culture and language of Japan, and after learning basic phrases to say from stage, he began studying Japanese on his own. During a stint at the South by Southwest music festival in Austin, TX, Allister met and became close with Japanese rock band Ellegarden, and they were soon invited to a two and a half month/ 40 date tour of Japan together in 2006. On this tour, Allister released the album Guilty Pleasures, on which Murphy sang most of the songs in Japanese, and the CD went on to sell over 250,000 copies. The following year, Allister member Tim Rogner found out that he was to become a father, and the band announced their intention to go on hiatus, but resumed activity again in 2010.

=== Solo Work ===
Scott Murphy went on to sign a deal as a solo artist with Japanese major record label Universal Music Japan - Universal J. In 2008, he released "Guilty Pleasures II", and "Guilty Pleasures 3" as a continuation of the band's past work. Both albums were certified Gold Records by the Recording Industry Association of Japan (RIAJ) for shipment of over 100,000 copies on September 10, 2009 and December 10, 2009.

Scott began making guest appearances on many popular Japanese television shows including: "Hey! Hey! Hey! Music Champ", "Music Station", "Music On! TV", "Sukkiri", "Mezamashi TV", "Hanamaru Market" among others, and took an ongoing role announcing for NHK World's "J-Melo" TV program. He also starred in a cheesecake commercial.

Over the next several years Scott released many more albums in the “Guilty Pleasures” series as well as an all English original album titled "Balance". He has released 2 live DVDs, as well as written songs and produced albums for several Japanese artists.

=== Scott & Rivers ===
In 2009 Scott began working on a new project with alternative rock band Weezer's frontman and vocalist Rivers Cuomo entitled Scott & Rivers. The pair share lead vocal duties, and released a 12-song album of original songs sung in Japanese on March 20, 2013, through Universal Music. The album contains 11 original songs and 1 cover of Kimura Kaela's song "Butterfly." They played their first show at the Countdown Japan Festival in Chiba, Japan on December 31, 2012, as the first non-Japanese act to perform at the 10-year-old festival, and went on to do a sold out headlining tour in March/April 2013 to promote the album's release. Murphy also joined Weezer on stage at the Punk Spring '13 festival in Tokyo, Osaka, and Nagoya to play Scott & Rivers first single,"Homely Girl." Scott & Rivers self-titled album is currently available physically only in Japan, and digitally worldwide through iTunes.

== Discography ==
=== Solo albums ===
- Guilty Pleasures II (2008)
- Guilty Pleasures 3 (2008)
- Battleground EP (2009)
- Balance (2009)
- Guilty Pleasures Love (2009)
- Guilty Pleasures 4 (2010)
- Guilty Pleasures Thriller (2010)
- Guilty Pleasures Animation (2011)
- Guilty Pleasures Best (2011)
- Guilty Pleasures Christmas (2012)

=== Misc Albums ===
- Nintendo 3DS Game – “Smile PreCure! Let’s Go! Märchenland" (2012): (All game music written by: Taka Chiyo, Luna Inaba, Scott Murphy, & The STEALTH)
- Disney's Nightmare Revisited (2008): Track #21. - Scott Murphy - "Sally's Song"
- Seventh Tarz Armstrong – Tokyo City Big Nights” (2008): Track #9. – goodnight war at 3Cafes. (Music Written by Scott Murphy)
- Haruka - Kimi no Mikata (2008): #2. Yukue Fumei (Music Written and Recorded by Scott Murphy) #3. Mirai Kouro (Music Written and Recorded by Scott Murphy)
- Pop Disaster - Flashback to Memories" (2007): (Album Produced by Scott Murphy)

=== Allister Albums ===
- Dead Ends and Girlfriends (1999)
- Last Stop Suburbia (2002)
- Before the Blackout (2005)
- Countdown to Nowhere (2010)
- Life Behind Machines (2012)

=== Scott & Rivers Albums ===
- Scott & Rivers (2013)
- Scott & Rivers (2017)

== See also ==
- Allister
- Scott & Rivers
