= Wusappaning?! =

EP by Home Grown
- Released: 1996
- Recorded: January 1996
- Length: 14:02
- Label: Burning Heart Records (Sweden) Cargo Music (USA)
- Producer: Jim Barnes, Home Grown

Home Grown chronology
That's Business (1995)	Wusappaning?! (1996)	Act Your Age (1998)

Wusappaning?! is an EP by the Orange County, California, rock band Home Grown, released in 1996 by Burning Heart Records. The EP was later released in the United States in 1998 by Cargo Music/Grilled Cheese.

The song "Another Face in the Crowd" is a re-recording of "Face in the Crowd" from the band's debut album That's Business. The song "We Are Dumb" was featured on the soundtrack for the 1998 comedy-thriller film Homegrown and stoner comedy Half Baked.

== Track listing ==
1. "We Are Dumb" (Tran)
2. "Shirley D. Pressed" (Tran)
3. "Hanging Out" (Tran)
4. "More Than Friends" (Lohrbach)
5. "Another Face in the Crowd" (Tran)

== Performers ==
- John "Johnee Trash" Tran - vocals, guitar
- Ian "Slur" Cone - vocals, guitar
- Adam "Adumb" Lohrbach - vocals, bass
- Bob "Stress" Herco - drums

== Album information ==
- Record label: Burning Heart Records
- Produced and engineered by Jim Barnes and Home Grown
- Recorded and mixed at Jim Barnes Audio Productions January 1996
- Layout by Mean Street Graphics
- Artwork by Ron Ruvalvcava Jr.
