= Find It in You =

EP by This Condition
- Released: August 28, 2007 (US)
- Recorded: 2007
- Genres: Rock, Pop rock
- Length: 19:16
- Producer: Dave Suchmann

This Condition chronology
Find It in You (2007)	We Don't Have to Be Alone (2008)

Professional ratings
Review scores
Source	Rating
AbsolutePunk.net	(82%) link
forthesound.com	(4.7/5)link
cluballey.com	(not rated) link

Find It in You is the name of This Condition's first demos, recorded in 2007.

The band's first effort has been recognized to be a "catchy-as-hell debut", featuring and overpoweringly optimistic message in its lyrics. Frontman Nate Cyphert's chops have been lauded by most of the reviews; in particular, James Viscardi of pop.is.dead:

"Lead singer Nate Cyphert has the makings to be a quintessential front man ala Freddie Mercury. This is fresh, original, inspirational and fun! You can’t go wrong with ingredients like that. Find It in You is full of infectious melodies and singalongable lyrics."

== Tracks ==
1. "The Pick-Up No. 96" - 3:20
2. "Sunday" – 3:45
3. "Thieves and the Things They Do" – 4:20
4. "In Brooklyn" – 4:24
5. "Cast Away" – 3:27
