= Life in Dreaming =

Studio album by Hidden in Plain View
- Released: February 22, 2005
- Recorded: 4th Street Recording (Santa Monica, California)
- Genre: Emo, pop punk, post-hardcore
- Length: 41:41
- Label: Drive-Thru
- Producer: Jim Wirt

Hidden in Plain View chronology
Hidden in Plain View EP (2003)	Life in Dreaming (2005)	Resolution (2007)

Professional ratings
Review scores
Source	Rating
Allmusic	link

Life in Dreaming is Hidden in Plain View's first full-length album, released on February 22, 2005 by Drive-Thru Records.

== Release ==
In September 2004, the band toured the US with Don't Look Down and Hellogoodbye. In January and February 2005, the band toured across the US with Something Corporate, Straylight Run, the Academy Is... and Armor for Sleep.

It was originally scheduled for an August 2004 release, but was postponed until February 2005 to gain time for promotion. The album includes an Enhanced CD portion with video footage of a live performance of "Twenty Below" at Chain Reaction in Anaheim, California and a making-of featurette. The band supported Less Than Jake on the Fueled by Ramen and Drive-Thru Records Tour between March and May 2005. It included an appearance at the Flipside Festival. They embarked on a European tour throughout the month with Allister, I Am the Avalanche and Halifax. In August and September 2005, they went on a cross-country US tour with the Academy Is..., Spitalfield and Halifax. In May 2006, they appeared at The Bamboozle festival.

During the recording session, two additional songs were recorded, which the band originally wrote in late 2001. "Hot & Sexy" was released on the B-side of the British vinyl single for "Ashes Ashes". The other track, "To Your Grave", remains unreleased. The Japanese edition of the album features none of these as bonus tracks, but two tracks which were originally released on the in-Japan-unavailable Hidden in Plain View EP. The album was released on limited edition vinyl by Company Ink Records and Drive-Thru Records in March 2013.

== Track listing ==
(all songs written by Hidden in Plain View)

1. "Bleed for You" – 3:51
2. "Ashes Ashes" – 2:39
3. "A Minor Detail" – 2:47
4. "The Point" – 3:53
5. "Twenty Below" – 3:25
6. "Garden Statement" – 4:48
7. "The Innocent Ones" – 6:33
8. "American Classic" – 3:08
9. "In Memory" – 3:21
10. "Top 5 Addictions" – 2:39
11. "Halcyon Daze" – 4:28

Japanese bonus tracks:

12. "Shamans Witches Magic" – 3:46
13. "The Chaser" – 3:02

== Credits ==
- Chris Amato – bass
- Rob Freeman – guitar, vocals
- Andrew McMahon – piano
- Spencer Peterson – drums
- Joe Reo – vocals
- Mike Saffert – guitar
- Patrick Warren – chamberlin
