= Last Stop Suburbia =

Studio album by Allister
- Released: October 8, 2002
- Recorded: February 18 – May 9, 2002
- Studio: Standard Electrical Recorders
- Genre: Pop punk; skate punk
- Length: 39:06
- Label: Drive-Thru
- Producer: Chris Fudurich

Allister chronology
Dead Ends and Girlfriends (1999)	Last Stop Suburbia (2002)	Before the Blackout (2005)

Last Stop Suburbia is Allister's third release on Drive-Thru Records and second studio album, released on October 8, 2002. It was also released on Mutant League Records on March 23, 2015.

== Recording ==
In November 2001, Allister played a few US shows with Reel Big Fish. The band planned to enter the studio in December. The band was in the studio from February 18, 2002 and planned to finish on March 18. Instead, the band finished recording on May 9. Sessions were held at Standard Electrical Recorders in Venice Beach, California, with producer and engineer Chris Fudurich; Ryan Baker did additional editing. Steve Evetts mixed the recordings at Trax East in South River, New Jersey, before the album was mastered by Stephen Marcussen at Marcussen Mastering in Hollywood, California.

== Release and reception ==
Professional ratings
Review scores
Source	Rating
AbsolutePunk	Favorable
AllMusic	2/5 stars
Ink 19	Mixed
The Mag	8/10 stars
Ox-Fanzine	5/10

On June 9, 2002, guitarist John Hamada left the band. Between late June and mid-August, the group went on the 2002 edition of Warped Tour. On August 31, "Overrated" was made available as a free download through the band's MP3.com profile. Originally planned for a June release, before being pushed back to August, then early September due mixing delays. Last Stop Suburbia was made available for streaming on September 25, before it was eventually released on October 8, 2002 through Drive-Thru. In early 2003, the band supported American Hi-Fi on their tour, before embarking on a trek across the US East Coast with Don't Look Down and Fall Out Boy. Between late August and October 2003, the group performed on the Drive-Thru Records 2003 Invasion Tour. In January 2004, the band went on a tour of the UK, with Home Grown, the Early November, and Hidden in Plain View. In May 2004, the band toured the US with Split Habit, Punchline, and Hidden in Plain View.

Last Stop Suburbia charted at number 9 on the Billboard Heatseekers Albums chart. The album would go on to sell 80,000 copies. Reviewing the album for AllMusic, Kurt Morris said the album was full of "upbeat, poppy songs" matched with "nice melodies and songs about girls and rock & roll." Morris also said it was "typical Drive-Thru Records pop-punk" fodder. BuzzFeed included the album at number 30 on their "36 Pop Punk Albums You Need To Hear Before You F——ing Die" list. Cleveland.com ranked "Somewhere on Fullerton" at number 74 on their list of the top 100 pop-punk songs.

== Track listing ==
Writing credits per booklet.

1. "Scratch" – 3:11 (Hamada)
2. "Radio Player" – 3:25 (Rogner)
3. "Flypaper" – 2:12 (Murphy)
4. "Overrated" – 2:25 (Rogner)
5. "Better Late Than Forever" – 2:40 (Hamada)
6. "The One That Got Away" – 1:41 (Murphy)
7. "Racecars" – 2:39 (Rogner)
8. "Matchsticks" – 2:04 (Rogner)
9. "Camouflage" – 2:14 (Murphy)
10. "Don't Think Twice" – 2:52 (Rogner)
11. "Somewhere on Fullerton" – 2:39 (Rogner)
12. "Westbound" – 2:14 (Murphy)
13. "Know It All" – 1:45 (Rogner)
14. "Stuck" – 1:55 (Hamada)
15. "Waiting for You" – 2:29 (Rogner)
16. "None of My Friends Are Punks" – 2:34 (Rogner)

== Charts ==
Chart (2002)	Peak position
U.S. Billboard Heatseekers Albums	9

== Personnel ==
Personnel per booklet.

Allister

- Tim Rogner – vocals, guitar
- Scott Murphy – vocals, bass
- Chris Rogner – vocals, guitar
- David Rossi – drums

Additional musicians

- John Hamada – vocals, guitar
- Ariel Rechtshaid – additional guitar (track 15)

Production

- Chris Fudurich – producer, engineer
- Steve Evetts – mixing
- Ryan Baker – additional editing
- Stephen Marcussen – mastering

Design

- Tim Stedman – art direction, design, interior photos
- Matt Mahurin – front and back cover illustrations
- Justin Stephens – band photo
- JP Robinson – design assistance
