= House of Fools =

House of Fools may refer to:

- House of Fools (film), a 2002 Russian film
- House of Fools (band), a rock band from Greensboro, North Carolina
- House of Fools (TV series), a British comedy series written by Vic Reeves and Bob Mortimer
