= This Is Us (The Necessary album) =

Studio album by The Necessary
- Released: June 22, 2004
- Recorded: The Basement Studios (Rural Hall, North Carolina)
- Genre: Rock, indie rock, pop punk
- Length: 37:52
- Label: Forsaken
- Producer: Joel Collins, The Necessary

Professional ratings
Review scores
Source	Rating
Allmusic	3/5 stars

This Is Us is the debut album of Greensboro, North Carolina rock band The Necessary. It was released on June 22, 2004, on Forsaken Recordings. In 2005, The Necessary signed with Drive-Thru Records and changed their name to House of Fools.

== Track listing ==
All songs are written by The Necessary.

1. "Captivated" – 4:27
2. "This Is Us" – 3:56
3. "When It Hurts" – 3:55
4. "Honestly" – 3:01
5. "Channel 26" – 4:25
6. "So It Comes to This" – 4:00
7. "Apartment D" – 3:37
8. "Passion" – 4:03
9. "Rise and Shine" – 3:53
10. "Free Hands" – 2:31

== Personnel ==
- Josh King – vocals, keyboards
- Joel Kiser – guitar
- Jeff Linn – bass
- David McLaughlin – guitar, vocals
- Todd Turner – drums
