= Tourmaline (disambiguation) =

Tourmaline is a crystalline boron silicate mineral

- Tourmaline (activist) (born 1982), American activist, filmmaker, and writer
- Tourmaline (band), an American rock band
- Tourmaline (novel), a 1963 novel by Randolph Stow
- Tourmaline Surfing Park, a public beach in San Diego, California, U.S.
- HMS Tourmaline (J339), a Royal Navy minesweeper
- USS Tourmaline, a U.S. Navy ship
- HMS Tourmaline, later HMS Cassandra, a Royal Navy destroyer
- "Tourmaline", a 2017 song by Aye Nako from Silver Haze
- "TOURMALINE", a 2025 song by Earl Sweatshirt from Live Laugh Love
