= We Can Breathe under Alcohol =

Studio album by An Angle
- Released: May 17, 2005
- Recorded: 2004
- Studio: The Hangar (Sacramento, California) in 2004
- Genres: Indie rock, folk rock
- Length: 54:29
- Label: Drive-Thru
- Producers: Kris Anaya, Robert Cheek

An Angle chronology
And Take It with a Grain of Salt (2004)	We Can Breathe under Alcohol (2005)	The Truth Is That You Are Alive (2007)

Professional ratings
Review scores
Source	Rating
AllMusic	2.5/5 stars
Alternative Press	2/5 stars
Drowned in Sound	8/10
Pitchfork	4.3/10
Punknews.org	2/5 stars

We Can Breathe under Alcohol is the second studio album by An Angle. The album was released in May 17, 2005.

== Production ==
The album employed more than 50 musicians over its ten tracks.

== Critical reception ==
Drowned in Sound wrote that "from main man Kris Anaya's confessional lyrics to the band's summery flourishes, We Can Breathe Under Alcohol is a surprising and satisfying listen."

== Track listing ==
1. "Green Water" – 4:19
2. "A Way With Words" – 3:55
3. "True Love" – 4:59
4. "Angry Drunk" – 6:16
5. "White Horse" – 4:14
6. "Born In A Bottle" – 8:41
7. "Competitive Love, Competitive Drugs" – 3:45
8. "Whales Talk, Whales Walk" – 5:14
9. "Change The World" – 5:42
10. "St. Augustine" – 7:24
