= Listen to Bob Dylan: A Tribute =

Compilation album by Various Artists
- Released: August 16, 2005
- Genre: Rock, emo, alternative rock
- Length: 45:49 (disc 1); 48:21 (disc 2)
- Label: Drive-Thru Records

Professional ratings
Review scores
Source	Rating
Allmusic	1.5/5 stars

Listen to Bob Dylan: A Tribute is a tribute album, dedicated to Bob Dylan. The two disc set was released on August 16, 2005, by Drive-Thru Records. Despite the record label's reputation for its emo/pop punk roster, the compilation album contained cover versions kept close to the originals, instead of pop punk renditions of the songs.

When announced in December 2004, the album was supposed to contain other artists, including Fall Out Boy, Flogging Molly and Hellogoodbye. Later track listings featured "With God on Our Side" by Straylight Run, "Hurricane" by MC Lars and "Subterranean Homesick Blues" by The Kites, which were all cut from the actual release.

Inside the booklet of the double disc album, Stephanie Reines (co-founder of Drive-Thru Records) describes that she hopes the album will be successful in "exposing a new generation of listeners to Bob Dylan." She also dedicates the album to Dylan, thanking him for "providing the soundtrack to the past 16 years of my life." Reines also describes how she came about listening to, and enjoying, Bob Dylan.

== Track listing ==
All songs written by Bob Dylan.

=== Disc one ===
1. "Don't Think Twice (It's Alright)" performed by Steel Train – 4:04
2. "Like a Rolling Stone" performed by Anberlin – 3:48
3. "Mr. Tambourine Man" performed by Roark – 5:55
4. "Tonight I'll Be Staying Here with You" performed by Socratic – 3:55
5. "Blowin' in the Wind" performed by House of Fools – 3:29
6. "Girl of the North Country" performed by As Tall as Lions – 3:32
7. "The Man in Me" performed by Jenoah – 3:04
8. "I Believe in You" performed by Cerys Matthews – 4:35
9. "Simple Twist of Fate" performed by The Format – 5:10
10. "A Hard Rain's A-Gonna Fall" performed by Jason Mraz – 8:12

=== Disc two ===
1. "Rainy Day Women #12 & 35" performed by Rock n Roll Soldiers – 3:18
2. "It Ain't Me Babe" performed by David Melillo – 3:58
3. "Positively 4th Street" performed by I Can Make a Mess Like Nobody's Business – 3:53
4. "Just like a Woman" performed by Something Corporate – 5:02
5. "She Belongs to Me" performed by Kisschasy – 2:50
6. "To Ramona" performed by Days Away – 5:05
7. "Boots of Spanish Leather" performed by Julia Haltigan – 7:02
8. "I Want You" performed by James Blunt – 2:42
9. "I Shall Be Released" performed by Steel Train – 4:51
10. "The Times They Are A-Changin'" performed by The Stay at Home Joneses – 3:12
11. "The Lonesome Death of Hattie Carroll" performed by Rx Bandits – 6:24

== See also ==
- List of songs written by Bob Dylan
- List of artists who have covered Bob Dylan songs
