= This Is Us (disambiguation) =

This Is Us is an American family drama television series.

This Is Us may also refer to:

== Music ==
- This Is Us (Backstreet Boys album), 2009
- This Is Us (The Necessary album), 2005
- This Is Us (EP), a 2018 extended play by BtoB
- "This Is Us", a song by LL Cool J from his 2000 album G.O.A.T.
- "This Is Us", a song by Emmylou Harris and Mark Knopfler from their collaborative 2006 album All the Roadrunning

== See also ==
- One Direction: This Is Us, a 2013 music documentary
