= Adelphi (band) =

American rock band

- Origin: Towson, Maryland, United States
- Genres: Rock, Pop
- Years active: 2002–2007
- Label: Drive-Thru Records
- Members: Ryan Keaton; Alex Sophocles; Matthew Thomas; Thomas Haller

Adelphi was an American rock band, based in Towson, Maryland. They formed in 2002 and were signed to the record label Drive-Thru Records. They played their last show as Adelphi on December 30, 2007 and three members now make up the band The Everlove.

== History ==
Adelphi was a four-piece rock band from Towson, Maryland, a suburb about 10 minutes north of Baltimore. Guitarist/singers Alex Sophocles and Ryan Keaton had been the original members of a band called Fat Austin. Along with bassist Rusty Walters, Fat Austin started off covering the popular pop-punk songs of Blink-182 and others. In 2001 the band released an EP featuring their song "On My Own" (or Brutus for their first fans), a local favorite.

By the fall of 2002 Fat Austin was known as Adelphi Rock and within a few months of the name change original drummer Peter Hennings was out and Tom Haller was in as Adelphi's official timekeeper. The quartet recorded a DIY album entitled "Don't Pass Go" in Spring/Summer of 2003 with the help of Matthew Thomas of American University. The album was pressed and self-released under the name "Adelphi Rock". In the fall of 2003 Adelphi Rock recorded 3 demo songs in an effort to attract label interest. A song called "Attention" was one of the three and it quickly helped put Adelphi Rock in the #1 spot on the then-new PureVolume website, a spot which the band held for weeks. This garnered some label interest and in early 2004 Drive-Thru Records extended the offer of a demo deal to the band. The band would go on to drop the 'Rock' from their name, being simply known as Adelphi. Due to interest from multiple labels Adelphi instead chose to fund the completion of their own demo and recorded 3 additional songs in the winter of 2004. It was around this time that original bassist Rusty Walters was replaced by Kevin Lichtfuss. After playing these additional demos for Drive-Thru Records the band and label reached an agreement. Their signing was officially announced in the spring of 2004.

Adelphi was known for their innovative style and exceptionally tight live performances. Their innovation was a result of a band made up of musicians with a wide variety of influences and interests. Aside from their classic rock and contemporary musical influences, band members drew from many different sources to create their sound. Drummer Haller regularly played with a polka band prior to and during his tenure with the band. Their relentless evolution prevented them from writing the same song twice, resulting in a very diverse collection of demos. This evolution was also rumored to be behind Adelphi's split with Drive-Thru Records, due to unresolvable disagreements in creative direction. The band's current status as a Drive-Thru band is ambiguous. To date the band has not officially been released from their contract but for all intents and purposes both the band and the label consider their relationship terminated. In late 2006 friend and producer Matt Thomas stepped in to replace Lichtfuss as bassist. The band continued to add to their collection of demos (rumored to number well into the high 20s or low 30s) for some time.

In late 2007, the band announced they would play their final show on December 30, 2007. Keaton, Haller, Thomas went on to play in the band The Everlove. Haller also drums for the John Mancini Band.

== Live Sets ==
Adelphi completed two US tours, the first in the fall of 2004 with Home Grown, Name Taken, and Denver Harbor. The band considered the first tour a success, mostly for the opportunity to get out of record mode and into a regular routine of live sets. At the end of the first tour, Home Grown even was kind enough to cover the band in garbage bags during their last set of the final show. The second tour was with labelmates Houston Calls and Self Against City, during the spring of 2005. Although both tours focused heavily on the West Coast and Southwestern United States, the second made its way across the bottom of the country and up the eastern seaboard. Adelphi continued to frequent local venues including the Recher Theatre in Towson, as well as Baltimore's Fletchers and The Ottobar venues. The band was also known to play house parties and stage impromptu jam sessions among close friends (often with whatever "musical" implements were at their disposal).

== Demos ==
The following is a list of demos recorded by the band in chronological order. These songs were recorded and distributed (albeit in small circles) as well as played live at shows and on the band's two national tours. There are rumored to be more songs that were left uncompleted or recorded only in rough form (i.e. by single overhead microphone during writing sessions.) This list contains only demos that were tracked and completed, to at least some level of satisfaction, by the band.

Don't Pass Go (2003)

- Adelphi's first official release was a DIY full-length they called "Don't Pass Go." Released under the band name "AdelphiRock", the groundwork for the album began in 2002 and the tracking/mixing was done by early summer 2003. Most of the songs were new, but a few were holdovers from the original Fat Austin days with drummer Pete Hennings (namely "You've Said Enough" and "Wake Up".) Tracking for the album was done at American University's 3AM studios during many graveyard shift recording sessions. Friend/Producer Matt Thomas co-produced the album (along with the band) and handled all mixing/engineering duties. It was mastered by Kevin McNoldy at Crystalphonics Studio in Charlottesville, VA. The album features the band's former bassist Rusty Walters.

DTR Demo - Fall '03 - Winter '04

- This demo was recorded for the purpose of shopping labels and was eventually passed along to Drive-Thru Records, which resulted in the band's signing to the label in the Spring of 2004. Recorded at Cloud 9 Studios in Baltimore's Station North neighborhood, it was again co-produced by Matt Thomas and Adelphi. "Ten" and "Attention" featured original bassist Walters. "Midnight Scene" bass duties were shared by Sophocles and Keaton. The remaining bass lines were tracked during the Winter of '04 by Kevin Lichtfuss. This time studio owner Mark Humphries handled engineering duties. Versions of parts of this demo are readily available on YouTube, both in "studio" form and live. "Song Tree" is available only as a live song or in incredibly rare original bedroom demo form. The track list is as follows:
1. "Ten"
2. "Attention"
3. "Midnight Scene"
4. "Freddy (How to Mimic Glass)"
5. "Bob (Engine 55)"
6. "Innocent, Charming, and Almost Refined"
7. 'Song Number Two (2 See Eye)"
8. 'Song Number Three (Song Tree)"

Demo #2 - Winter/Spring '05

- Written after the band's first national tour this demo was the first sign of Adelphi's changing sound. The tracking and engineering for this demo was done in the basement of Ryan Keaton's home in the Towson neighborhood of Anneslie. The songs on this demo were originally written for an EP which was influenced by the transition from day to night. The song "The Wind Whispers" marked the midpoint in the cycle, hence the 12 chimes before the song's bridge. "Walking..." and "The Wind Whispers" were later mastered and released on a DTR EP but the rest of the songs remained unheard by the masses. "Flores en el Mar" was originally written for a Drive-Thru Records Christmas compilation but was excluded at the last minute because the band was unhappy some of the vocal tracking. Copies of this demo are floating around but have been kept relatively close. The track list is as follows:
1. "Walking on the Ceiling of the Sky"
2. "The Wind Whispers"
3. "Song #6"
4. "Song #7"
5. "Song #8"
6. "Flores en el Mar" (Tracked/Mixed at Crystalphonics Studios)

Demo # 3 - Fall '05

- Continuing along the evolutionary process this demo contains an even broader variety of songs, greater implementation of different styles and effects, as well as improved sound quality due to upgrading of equipment. Dope, Hope, and Rope were written first (during the summer of 2005). The second cluster of songs were written later in the year. Like Demo #2 this was tracked and engineered by Matt Thomas in the basement of Ryan Keaton's home in Anneslie. The track list is as follows:
1. "Dope"
2. "House"
3. "Hope"
4. "Junga Junga"
5. "Patrick Swayze"
6. "Halo 2 Ruined my Life"
7. "Rope"

Demo # 4 - Spring '06

- This is the latest completed demo by the band. This was the third demo to be both tracked and engineered in Ryan Keaton's home. The songs on this demo mark a turning point for the band, as their relationship with their label was souring. The track list is as follows:
1. "Aloha Bacon"
2. "We All Come Up"
3. "Sir Chops-A-Lot"
4. "President Tree" (instrumentation tracked during demo #3, vocals tracked during demo #4)

3 Song Sampler - Summer '06

- Features three of Adelphi's previous demos that have been updated and recorded at Crystalphonic Studios in Charlottesville, VA.
1. "Aloha Bacon"
2. "Junga Junga"
3. "Sir Chops-A-Lot"

Summer '07

- Adelphi's last demo, a result of Sophocles' and Thomas' desire to write a "disco feeling" rock song. This demo was tracked over a 24-hour period at Sophocles' house. This is the only Adelphi recording to feature Thomas on bass.
1. "Spank UK"

== Discography ==
=== Albums ===
- Don't Pass Go (2003) - Self-Released/Enthused Productions
1. Sit and Stare
2. Starting Point
3. You've Said Enough
4. Better This Way
5. Too Far From Home
6. Spring Break My Heart
7. Falling in Autumn
8. Wake Up
9. Tommy Tsunami
10. Acoustified
11. All Too Soon
12. Jack Eats Much Cake

=== EPs ===
- Walking on the Ceiling of the Sky (2005) - Drive-Thru Records
1. Attention
2. Midnight Scene
3. Walking On The Ceiling Of The Sky
4. The Wind Whispers

== Former members ==
- Peter Hennings - Drums
- Rusty Walters - Bass
- Kevin Lichtfuss - Bass
