= Caught Inside =

Being caught inside is when a surfer cannot get past the breaking surf to the safer part of the ocean.

Caught Inside may also refer to:

- Caught Inside (band), a four-member punk band originally from Miami, Florida
- Caught Inside (film), a 2010 Australian thriller directed by Adam Blaiklock
