= And Take It with a Grain of Salt =

...And Take It with a Grain of Salt

Studio album by An Angle
- Released: November 9, 2004
- Recorded: The Hangar (Sacramento, California) in 2002
- Genre: Indie rock, folk rock
- Length: 53:23
- Label: Drive-Thru
- Producer: Kris Anaya, Robert Cheek

An Angle chronology
...And Take It with a Grain of Salt (2004)	We Can Breathe under Alcohol (2005)

...And Take It with a Grain of Salt is the first full-length album by the Indie rock band An Angle. It was originally released on UnderAcloud Records in 2002, and later re-released on Drive-Thru Records on November 9, 2004.

== Track listing ==
1. "For Everyday Brought Up This One" – 3:36
2. "Unnoticeable" – 2:53
3. "Today I Saw Your Face" – 3:21
4. "Self Medicate" – 5:58
5. "Like a Locket, Like a Necklace, Like a Bracelet" – 7:18
6. "Off to School" – 4:22
7. "Did You, Did You, Did You" – 4:27
8. "Flicker of a Cigarette" – 2:53
9. "There Is a Ship, Let's Sail" – 2:47
10. "Streetlights Usually Turn Yellow" – 2:33
11. "An Eagle Circles the Forest" – 13:15
