= Say No More (band) =

- Origin: Salinas, California, U.S.
- Genres: Rock, indie rock, pop rock, pop punk
- Years active: 2001–2009
- Labels: Drive-Thru
- Members: Peter Pedrazzi; Peter Holbert; Jon Rasmussen; Tim Spier
- Website: SayNoMoreRock.com

Say No More was an American four-piece rock band from Salinas, California, United States, formed in December 2001. The band independently released two records — 2004's Stranger in Dreams and 2006's The Transition. In August 2005, the quartet relocated to Los Angeles, California to attend California State University, Northridge. Shortly thereafter, they placed first in 2006's "Best Music on Campus" award — a battle of the bands competition held by Drive-Thru Records in cooperation with mtvU — which led to a recording contract with the record label. Preceded by the songs "This Is Our Way" and "Long Drive Home", What You Thought You Knew was released in October 2007. The music video for their single "Long Drive Home" was released on mtvU and mtvU.com on September 5, 2008.

== Members ==
- Peter Pedrazzi – vocals, rhythm guitar
- Peter Holbert – lead guitar
- Jon Rasmussen – backing vocals, bass guitar
- Tim Spier – drums, backing vocals

== Discography ==
- Demo (Early 2004)
- Stranger in Dreams (2004)
- The Transition EP (2006)
- What You Thought You Knew (2007)

Videography

- Long Drive Home (2008) Director: Marco de la Torre, Director of Photography: Greg Ephraim, Producer: Stefan Anderson, Stunts: Eric Jacobus, Ray Carbonel, Shaun Finney
