= Scott & Rivers =

Musical project

- Origin: Los Angeles, California, U.S.
- Genres: Alternative rock; rock; J-pop
- Years active: 2010–present
- Labels: Delicious Deli; Sony Music Japan
- Spinoff of: Weezer; Allister
- Members: Scott Murphy; Rivers Cuomo
- Website: universal-music.co.jp/scott-and-rivers/

Scott & Rivers is an American Japanese-language musical project by Rivers Cuomo of the band Weezer and Scott Murphy of the band Allister.

== History ==
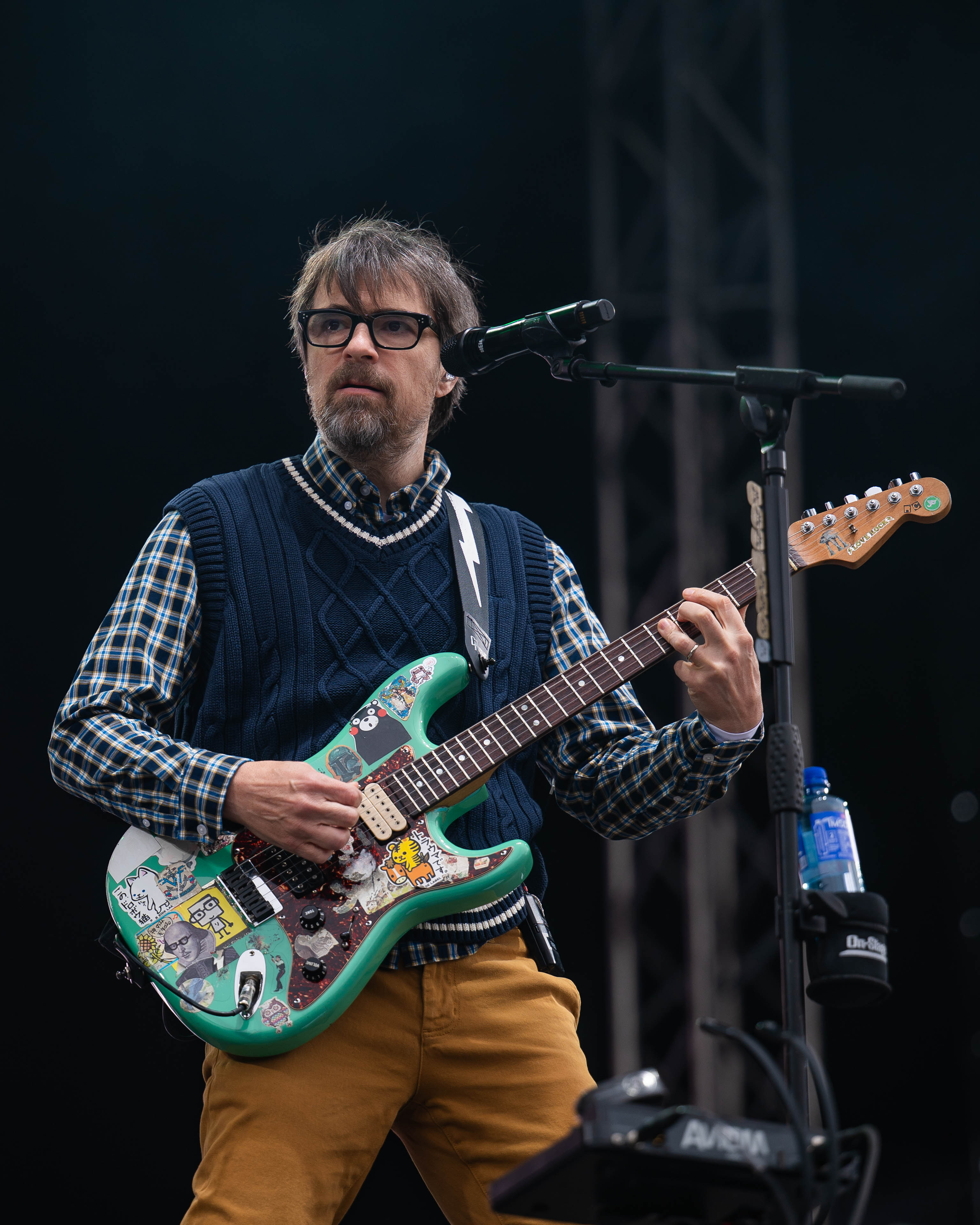
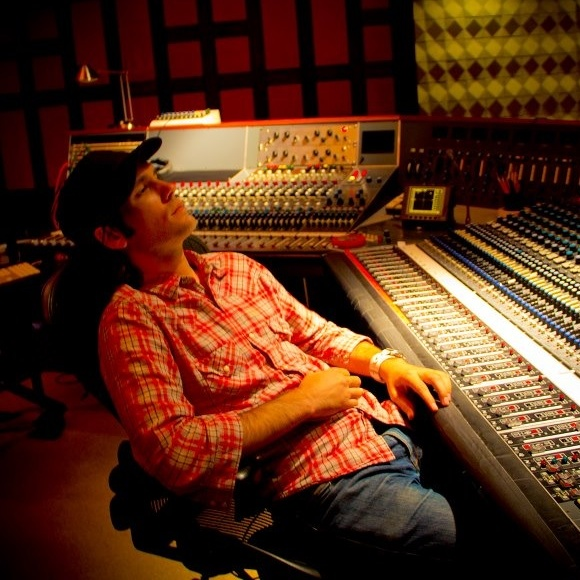
Band members Rivers Cuomo (left) and Scott Murphy

In 2009, while on tour in Japan, Rivers Cuomo was introduced to Scott Murphy's Japanese-language music. After discovering that they were both signed to Universal Music Group, Rivers asked the label to arrange a meeting.

They met in Los Angeles in 2009, and soon began writing and recording an album of original songs sung in Japanese together for the new "Scott & Rivers" project, as they both speak fluent Japanese. They both share lead vocal duties and play guitar in the group. Scott & Rivers played their first shows at the Radio Crazy Festival in Osaka, Japan on 29 December 2012 and at the Countdown Japan Festival in Chiba, Japan on 31 December 2012, as the first non-Japanese act to perform at the popular festivals.

On March 20, 2013, Scott & Rivers released a 12-song self-titled album through Delicious Deli Records, then an imprint of Universal Music Japan. The album contains 11 original songs, plus a cover of Kaela Kimura's song "Butterfly." They played a sold out headlining tour in March and April 2013 to promote the album's release. Scott Murphy also joined Cuomo's band Weezer on stage at the Punk Spring '13 festival in Tokyo, Osaka, and Nagoya to play their first single, "Homely Girl" for the Japanese audiences. They also played as an act on the second Weezer Cruise in 2014.

In 2015, Rivers' band Weezer, recorded an English version of one of their songs, "カリフォルニア (California)", as "California Kids" and released it as the opening track of their album "Weezer (White Album)".

Scott & Rivers debuted at #1 on the iTunes Japan alternative charts on the week it was released. The album is currently available physically only in Japan, and digitally worldwide through iTunes.

On April 12, 2017, they released their second album, ニマイメ (Nimaime) through Sony Music Japan. A month later, the duo performed a Japanese folk song in an ad for Uniqlo.

== Discography ==
- Scott & Rivers (2013)
- ニマイメ (Nimaime) (2017)
