= Connection (Home Grown and Limbeck EP) =

EP (split) by Home Grown and Limbeck
- Released: 2000
- Genre: Punk rock, Pop punk, Alternative rock
- Length: 18:16
- Label: Utility Records
- Producer: Craig Nepp, Home Grown, Limbeck

Home Grown chronology
EP Phone Home (1999)	Connection (2000)	Kings of Pop (2002)

Limbeck chronology
Connection (2000)

Connection is a split EP by the Orange County, California, rock bands Home Grown and Limbeck, released in 2000 by Utility Records. It resulted from a tour the previous year on which the two bands played together and became friends.

The EP was Home Grown's final recording with guitarist Justin Poyser and drummer Bob Herco, who both left the band in 2000.

== Track listing ==
1. Home Grown - "Promise Breaker"
2. Limbeck - "29 Times"
3. Home Grown - "Single All the Way"
4. Limbeck - "Invisible"
5. Home Grown - "She Don't Care"
6. Limbeck - "Rush Hour in Logtown"

== Personnel ==
Home Grown:

- John "John E. Trash" Tran - vocals, guitar
- Justin Poyser - guitar, vocals
- Adam Lohrbach - vocals, bass guitar
- Bob Herco - drums

Limbeck:

- Patrick Carrie - guitar, vocals
- Robb MacLean - guitar, vocals
- Justin Entsminger - bass guitar
- Matthew Stephens - drums
- David Delfonzo - keyboards

== Album information ==
- Record label: Utility Records
- Mixed by Craig Nepp at Frontpage Studios and mastered by Charlie at Mono Phonix, both in Glendale, California.
- Tracks 1, 3 & 5 produced and engineered by Craig Nepp and Home Grown at Frontpage Studios.
- Tracks 2, 4 & 6 engineered by Kyle Homme at Pool House Audio and Literary Commissions in Fullerton, California, and produced by Limbeck.
- Cover photo and design by Jamie from The Stereo
- Photo of Matt from Limbeck drumming by Dave Rothenberg
- All other photography by Dave Lauridsen
- Layout and art direction by Robb MacLean and Adam Lohrbach
