= Tourmaline (band) =

American band

- Origin: Verona, New Jersey, US
- Genres: Rock & Roll, Indie, Alternative; Rock
- Years active: 2004–2011
- Labels: No Milk Records; Platform Group; Universal Records
- Members: Matthew Rauch; Max Rauch; Ryan Baredes />John Macelwee
- Past members: Andrew Koes; Justin Niemiec; Rob Pratola; Corey Zaloom
- Website: myspace.com/tourmaline

Tourmaline was an American rock band from, New Jersey. Formed in June 2004, the band consisted of Matt Rauch (Guitar, Lead Vocals), Ryan Baredes (Guitar), Max Rauch (Drums), Corey Zaloom (Keyboards), and Justin Niemiec (Bass) They released two albums. Strange Distress Calls was released in the United States a year after the band's formation on June 21, 2005. The Swindle was recorded in March 2008 with producer Joe Mcgrath and released in the fall of 2008.

== History ==
Strange Distress Calls, their first full-length released on No Milk Records was well received by many critics getting positive reviews from Absolutepunk.net, Punknews.org, as well as receiving four out of five stars from Allmusic. The band's first song to gain significant attention was "Blank", which fell into rotation on many college radio stations during the summer of 2005, while they were on tour with Socratic (Drive-Thru Records). It was also featured on many compilations. In 2008 Tourmaline released their full-length record "The Swindle" to favorable reviews.

== Members ==
The band consisted of:

- Matt Rauch – Guitar, Lead Vocals
- Ryan Baredes – Guitar
- Max Rauch – Drums, Backing Vocals
- Corey Zaloom - Keyboards, Backing Vocals
- Justin Niemiec - Bass

== Discography ==
=== LP ===
Strange Distress Calls – 2005
The Swindle – 2008
Wreckage – 2010 (Unreleased)
