= When It All Comes Down =

EP by Home Grown
- Released: October 10, 2004
- Genre: Pop punk, rock, emo
- Length: 20:49
- Label: Drive-Thru
- Producer: Parker Case

Home Grown chronology
Kings of Pop (2002)	When It All Comes Down (2004)

Professional ratings
Review scores
Source	Rating
Allmusic	3/5 stars

When It All Comes Down is an EP by the rock band Home Grown, released in 2004 by Drive-Thru Records. It was the band's final release, as they went on "indefinite hiatus" the following year. The EP found the band moving away from the humor-filled pop punk of their previous releases and towards more heartfelt and emotional subject matter. Bassist Adam Lohrbach would carry these stylistic elements over to his subsequent band New Years Day and continue to expand on them.

== Track listing ==
No.	Title	Writer(s)	Length
1.	"Keep Your Distance"	Tran	3:18
2.	"Cross My Heart"	Lohrbach	3:19
3.	"I Was Right About This"	Tran	3:41
4.	"Midnight City Sky"	Lohrbach	3:20
5.	"I Win, You Lose"	Tran	3:29
6.	"What Would Love Do Now"	Lohrbach	3:42
Total length:			23:49

== Personnel ==
- John Tran - vocals, guitar
- Dan Hammond - guitar, vocals
- Adam Lohrbach - vocals, bass
- Darren Reynolds - drums

== Album information ==
- Record label: Drive-Thru Records
- Produced, mixed, and engineered by Parker Case
- Co-produced by Home Grown
- Recorded and mixed at Tetty Nash Studios in Coto de Caza, California
- Mastered by Louie Teran at Marcussen Mastering in Hollywood, California
- Tracks 1, 3 & 5 written by John Tran
- Tracks 2, 4 & 6 written by Adam Lohrbach
- Design by Joshua M. Ortega
