= Resolution (Hidden in Plain View album) =

Studio album by Hidden in Plain View
- Released: July 24, 2007
- Genre: Emo, pop punk, post-hardcore
- Length: 42:05
- Label: Drive-Thru

Hidden in Plain View chronology
Life in Dreaming (2005)	Resolution (2007)

Professional ratings
Review scores
Source	Rating
AbsolutePunk.net	73% link
Allmusic	link

Resolution is Hidden in Plain View's second full-length album, released on July 24, 2007 through Drive-Thru Records. This album was released after the band had already broken up.

The album was produced by Brian McTernan.

== Track listing ==
1. Bendy - 3:24
2. I Don't Wanna Hear It - 2:51
3. Like An Ocean - 2:58
4. Heavy Breathing - 3:43
5. Walk Harbor City - 3:48
6. Circles - 3:55
7. Our Time - 3:43
8. Off My Shoulders - 4:24
9. Interlude - 0:57
10. Something Needs To Change - 4:13
11. The Lake House - 3:58
12. Hear Me Out - 4:11
