= EP Phone Home (Home Grown EP) =

EP by Home Grown
- Released: November 16, 1999
- Studio: For the Record Studios in Orange, California
- Genre: Punk rock, pop punk
- Length: 14:53
- Label: Outpost Recordings
- Producer: Craig Nepp, Home Grown

Home Grown chronology
Act Your Age (1998)	EP Phone Home (1999)	Connection (2000)

EP Phone Home is an EP by the Orange County, California rock band Home Grown, released in 1999 by Outpost Recordings. It was the band's first recording with guitarist Justin Poyser, who replaced Ian Cone the previous year.

In between some of the tracks there are brief "joke" songs of only a few chords with the lyrics "This song is only _ seconds long." Between "This Way" and "Sixteen" there is a 5-second song, between "Giving Up" and "No Way Out" there is a 6-second one, and after "No Way Out" a 1-second one. Also "hidden" shortly after this 1-second song are takes of the band trying to record these joke songs.

== Track listing ==
1. "Barbie Girl" (Johnny Mosegaard/Karsten Dahlgaard/Claus Norreen/Søren Rasted/René Dif/Lene Nystrom; originally performed by Aqua)
2. "This Way" (Lohrbach)
3. "Sixteen" (Tran)
4. "Giving Up" (Tran)
5. "No Way Out" (Lohrbach)

== Personnel ==
Adapted from AllMusic

- John "John E. Trash" Tran - vocals, guitar
- Justin Poyser - guitar, vocals
- Adam Lohrbach - vocals, bass
- Bob Herco - drums

Production

- Home Grown - producers
- Alan Douches - mastering
- John D. Repka - art direction, illustrations
- Kevin Estrada - photography
- David Crowley - photography
