= This Condition =

American pop rock band

- Origin: Long Island, New York
- Genres: Rock, pop rock
- Years active: 2006–2013
- Past members: Nate Cyphert; Steve Keyes; Mike McGovern; Nick Cantatore; Anthony Giambalvo; Devin Passariello; Stephen Conley; Chris Castellino

This Condition, often abbreviated as TC, is a pop rock band originating from Long Island, New York. The band was formed in 2007 and announced their breakup in 2013. This Condition performed with major bands such as Yellowcard and Brand New. The band's name originates from lyrics to the song "Dark Blue" by Jack's Mannequin.

== History ==
=== Formation (2006–2007) ===
Guitarist Mike McGovern, drummer Steve Keyes and vocalist Nate Cyphert met while working at American Eagle Outfitters. In late 2006, the three, coming out of recent band break ups, combined with guitarist Anthony Giambalvo and Nick Cantatore (who had previously played with Keyes in a band) to form a new band. In early 2007, This Condition was formed.

This Condition went into the studio in the summer of 2007 to record their first demos. The demos garnered the band some attention on Long Island, inspiring one journalist to write that Cyphert's vocals both resemble those of The Rocket Summer's Bryce Avary. These positive reviews, as well as their growing popularity in their live shows carried over into their success in 2008.

=== We Don't Have to Be Alone and departure of Giambalvo (2008–2009) ===
The band branched out and grew in popularity in 2008, sharing the stage with Yellowcard and Brand New after winning Adelphi's Battle of the Bands, and landing a cover article on Pulse Magazine. Following their month-long East Coast tour in the summer of 2008, they returned to Killingsworth Studio in Hicksville, New York with producer Anthony Santonocito to record their 1st EP, We Don't Have to Be Alone, released on November 18, 2008. This Condition was also selected to perform on the Zumiez Stage at The Bamboozle 2009.

They headed into Pilot Recording Studios in Boonton, New Jersey, in early June 2009 to record three tracks with producer Rob Freeman, formerly of Hidden in Plain View. These three tracks were intended to be released as singles through iTunes and similar digital music retailers, with the last track, Take, Take, Take never making it to official digital release. The band's tour manager has been featured on MTV's reality show Room Raiders. The Band also performed on the Stop Stage at the tail end of the 2009 Warped Tour. At the end of 2009, the band parted ways with lead guitarist, Anthony Giambalvo, who wanted to focus on his education.

=== Spirit (2010–2011) ===
Following the band's departure with Giambalvo, they headed back to Pilot Recording Studios in April 2010, recording a five-song EP with producer Rob Freeman. It is tentatively scheduled to be released in the summer of 2010. On April 21, 2010, they left a MySpace bulletin that stated that Steve Keyes left the band, returning to school to get his degree. During that time, drummer Devin Passariello, formerly of The Bride Wore Black, joined the band. The band became a five-piece again in early May 2010, with guitarist-vocalist Stephen Conley, formerly of The Victory from New Jersey, joining the band. The band released the EP, Spirit in July 2010. In 2011, the band added a new member, keyboard player/backing vocalist Chris Castellino, formerly of TV/TV.

=== Sessions and Breakup (2012–2013) ===
This Condition started writing new music with The Early November's Ace Enders in February 2012. These songs were recorded in three different sessions, resulting in a seven-song EP, entitled Sessions, which was released on April 23, 2013. In a release on the band's web site on March 7, 2013, they announced their breakup. The band played two final shows in April 2013, with their final being a sold out show at Highline Ballroom in New York City on April 28, 2013.

== Members ==
- Nate Cyphert – vocals, acoustic guitar (2006–2013)
- Steve Keyes – drums (2006–2010)
- Mike McGovern – guitar (2006–2013)
- Nick Cantatore – bass (2006–2013)
- Anthony Giambalvo – guitar (2006–2009)
- Devin Passariello – drums (2010–2013)
- Stephen Conley – guitar, backing vocals (2010–2013)
- Chris Castellino – keyboard, backing vocals (2011–2013)

== Discography ==
=== EPs ===
1. We Don't Have to Be Alone - November 18, 2008
2. Spirit - July 27, 2010
3. Sessions - April 23, 2013

=== Singles ===
1. Home (Won't Let You Go) - October 13, 2009
2. Never Enough - November 3, 2009
