= Homegrown (1998 film) =

- Theatrical release poster
- Directed by: Stephen Gyllenhaal
- Written by: Stephen Gyllenhaal; Nicholas Kazan
- Produced by: Jason Clark
- Starring: Billy Bob Thornton; Hank Azaria; Kelly Lynch; Jon Bon Jovi; Ryan Phillippe; Judge Reinhold; Jon Tenney; Ted Danson; John Lithgow; Jamie Lee Curtis
- Cinematography: Greg Gardiner
- Edited by: Michael Jablow
- Music by: Trevor Rabin
- Production companies: TriStar Pictures; Lakeshore Entertainment
- Distributed by: Sony Pictures Releasing
- Release date: April 17, 1998
- Running time: 115 minutes
- Country: United States
- Language: English
- Box office: $77,910

Homegrown is a 1998 American dark comedy-drama thriller film directed by Stephen Gyllenhaal and starring Billy Bob Thornton, John Lithgow and Hank Azaria. The plot follows marijuana harvesters in Northern California who become drawn into a world of crime bosses and corrupt cops. The film was released by Sony Pictures Releasing on April 17, 1998.

== Plot ==
Small-time marijuana harvesters in Northern California Jack, Carter and Harlan witness their boss Malcolm shot dead by the pilot who flies him to visit his flourishing marijuana plantation. After getting over the initial shock, Jack organizes the crew. They break down their camp, grab enough crop to cover their losses and hightail it.

Carter and Harlan take the crop they have cut to Lucy's to dry it out, while Jack looks into finding a buyer. As they are unsure as to who is behind Malcolm's death, they try to keep the business running, negotiating their biggest sale while keeping the murder secret.

When someone calls Jack and Lucy does not recognize the voice and they all seem to be acting strangely, she asks what is going on. Jack makes up a story about Malcolm, giving her the impression that he is in trouble, has gone into hiding and needs to make quick money.

After the naive trio successfully sell the crop they brought, they then get greedy and try to take over the business themselves. Carter is skeptical they can get away with it, but returning to the marijuana plantation and seeing that no one else has touched the crop, they try to cover up Malcolm's demise.

As Carter and Harlan work with a crew on the plantation, harvesting the product, Jack has gone to Malcolm's. He listens to his answering machine messages, discovering there are several people looking for Malcolm.

When the young Harlan sleeps with Lucy, he tells her everything. She confronts Jack and Carter, insisting she get a cut. At a growers' social event, Jack speaks to a colleague Sierra who seems to know about Malcolm's demise. Then, people posing as cops come for a hiker Harlan was watching. There is a shootout, Harlan shoots him so they leave him in a hospital, claiming it was a shooting accident as they were moose hunting.

The ill-prepared trio find themselves in over their heads. Jack is warned that the police are raiding the plantation, so he manages to help Carter and Harlan narrowly escape. Then Gianni calls, insisting on a face-to-face with Malcolm. Jack goes, posing as him, and finds out the Mafia are expecting a shipment.

At Lucy's, she and the increasingly more and more nervous trio end up getting kidnapped by someone in a ski mask demanding Malcolm. When they tell him he is dead, he makes the four show him the body. After he gets photographic proof, he forces all of them into the grave. Unmasking himself, the trio recognize him as the murdering helicopter pilot. He makes them promise, at threat of death, to not sell the weed to the mafia.

The next morning, as the four are loading the product onto the van Malcolm's identical twin Richard shows up. He tries to pressure them to still sell to Gianni, however Jack is not intimidated so they take the dope to sell to Danny.

As drops are meant to be done one-on-one, Jack drives the truck while the other three watch hidden from view. Danny tells him the growers all know about Malcolm's death, as they were responsible for it, so offers him a much lower price for not being transparent about it. Jack starts to walk away as a bargaining tactic, however Harlan's head pops up, causing Danny to bolt.

Before the four can drive off with the truck full of dope, the cops arrive. Later, they and a crowd watch through a link fence as the marijuana is burned, and everyone gets high.

== Cast ==
- Billy Bob Thornton as Jack Marsden
- Hank Azaria as Carter
- Kelly Lynch as Lucy
- John Lithgow as Malcolm / Robert Stockman
- Jamie Lee Curtis as Sierra Kahan
- Ted Danson as Gianni Saletzzo
- Jon Bon Jovi as Danny
- Ryan Phillippe as Harlan Dykstra
- Judge Reinhold as Policeman
- Jon Tenney as Helicopter Pilot
- Matt Ross as Ben Hickson
- Matt Clark as Sheriff
- Maggie Gyllenhaal as Christina
- Jake Gyllenhaal as Jake / Blue Kahan
- Kleoka Renee Sands as 4-Year-Old Girl
- Leigh French as Waitress
- Christopher Dalton as Old Farmer
- Tiffany Paulsen as Heather the Stockbreeder
- Jeanette H. Wilson as White Haired Woman
- Seamus McNally as Hippie Hank
- Steve Carell as Party Extra with Funny Pants (uncredited)
- Ramsay Midwood as Bill the Gas station guy

== Reception ==
On review aggregator website Rotten Tomatoes, Homegrown has an approval rating of 44% based on 18 reviews. In a positive review, Lawrence Van Gelder of The New York Times praised the cast and the film's plot "that mingles murder mystery, rustic comedy, outlaw sociology, plant husbandry, lusty romance and layers of old-fashioned avarice, which is to say old-fashioned business".

Leonard Klady of Variety wrote the film "[opts] for a droll tone that puts the yarn of illegal growing and selling into the leagues of muted outlawism that characterized such vintage fare as 'Beat the Devil' and 'The Gang That Couldn't Shoot Straight'", adding that the film's ensemble cast, with the exception of Thornton and Lithgow, are "seemingly unsupported by direction or precision from the script." The Los Angeles Times was generally negative, criticizing the film's combination of different genres, writing that it was "a little too funky and shambling to provide much mystery or tension, it's not funny enough to qualify as a comedy and it doesn't add much of substance to the debate over legalizing marijuana."

== Soundtrack ==
The soundtrack was released on June 11, 2002, on Will Records.

Track list:

1. "Smoke Two Joints" by Sublime [4:46] – (original version by The Toyes)
2. "Book Of Rules" by The Heptones [3:51]
3. "GBH" by Death In Vegas [5:13]
4. "Pass The Dutchie" by Buck-O-Nine [2:59]
5. "We Are Dumb" by Home Grown [1:55]
6. "I Smell A Rat" by Sebadoh [1:36]
7. "Stars" by Green Apple Quick Step [3:17]
8. "Gone To Stay" by Elaine Summers [3:58]
9. "Great Escape" by Chaser [4:44]
10. "Sick And Beautiful" by Artificial Joy Club [4:24]
11. "Electro Glide in Blue" by Apollo Four Forty [8:36]
12. "Burn" by Lucky Me [4:10]
13. "Hold on to Me" by Cowboy Junkies [3:21]
