= Before the Blackout =

Studio album by Allister
- Released: October 11, 2005
- Studio: The Vault (Fullerton, California); World Class Audio (Anaheim, California)
- Genre: Pop punk; punk rock; alternative rock
- Length: 46:05
- Label: Drive-Thru
- Producer: Dennis Hill, Kyle Homme

Allister chronology
Last Stop Suburbia (2002)	Before the Blackout (2005)	Countdown to Nowhere (2010)

Professional ratings
Review scores
Source	Rating
AbsolutePunk	72%
AllMusic	3.5/5 stars
Drowned in Sound	5/10
Ox-Fanzine	9/10

Before the Blackout is Allister's third studio album.

== Release ==
On July 14, 2005, Before the Blackout was announced for release in three months' time; that same day, "Study in Economics" was made available for streaming. It was released on October 11, 2005 on Drive-Thru Records. Between October and December 2005, they supported Fenix TX on their farewell US tour. They closed the year playing four holiday shows with Catch 22. From late January until early March 2006, the band supported Mest on their tour of the US. In March and April 2007, Allister went on a tour of Japan, before breaking up. They played a final show in Chicago, Illinois.

== Track listing ==
(all songs written by Allister, except where noted otherwise)

1. "Waiting" – 3:23
2. "D²" – 4:09
3. "A Lotta Nerve" (Allister, Dennis Hill) – 2:42
4. "From the Ground Up" (Allister, Rory Cleveland) – 2:14
5. "Blackout" – 4:08
6. "Rewind" – 2:59
7. "2 A.M." – 3:32
8. "You Lied" – 3:23
9. "A Study in Economics" – 3:35
10. "Suffocation" – 2:55
11. "Easy Answers" (Allister, Hill, Kyle Homme) – 2:55
12. "The Legend of Pegleg Sullivan" – 2:45
13. "Potential Suicide" – 3:11
14. "Alone" – 4:04

Bonus track

The Japanese version of the album, issued through In-n-Out Records, includes a bonus track. The track, sung in Japanese, is a cover version of a 1993 The Boom song.

15. "Shima Uta" (Kazufumi Miyazawa (宮沢和史, Miyazawa Kazufumi)) – 3:06

== Personnel ==
- Kyle Lewis - guitar
- Mike Leverence - drums
- Scott Murphy - vocals, bass
- Tim Rogner - vocals, guitar
