= The Truth Is That You Are Alive =

Studio album by An Angle
- Released: June 12, 2007
- Recorded: The Hangar (Sacramento, California)
- Genre: Indie rock, folk rock
- Length: 45:18
- Label: Drive-Thru
- Producer: Kris Anaya, Robert Cheek

An Angle chronology
5 Days 5 Songs (2006)	The Truth Is That You Are Alive (2007)

Professional ratings
Review scores
Source	Rating
AbsolutePunk.net	91%
Allmusic	3.5/5 stars

The Truth Is That You Are Alive is the third full-length album by An Angle.

== Track listing ==
1. "oh! oh! oh! Trouble" – 3:30
2. "Clean and Gold" – 3:17
3. "Falling In Your Arms" – 3:42
4. "Even If I..." – 3:24
5. "Going To Heaven" – 2:04
6. "No More Child" – 4:17
7. "Red River" – 2:21
8. "I'm Alright" – 3:45
9. "Ghost In The Mirror" – 4:23
10. "C'mon C'mon" – 4:14
11. "On My Way" - 5:56
12. "You Are Loved" - 4:25
