= That's Business =

Studio album by Home Grown
- Released: October 31, 1995
- Genre: Punk rock, pop punk, ska punk
- Length: 73:09
- Label: Liberation
- Producer: Home Grown & Steve Kravac

Home Grown chronology
That's Business (1995)	Act Your Age (1998)

Professional ratings
Review scores
Source	Rating
AllMusic	4/5 stars

That's Business is the debut album by the rock band Home Grown, released in 1995 by Liberation Records. Releasing in Europe via Burning Heart Records. It was the band's first album and established their presence in the prolific southern California music scene of the 1990s. It includes several songs that would become fan favorites such as "Surfer Girl" and "Face in the Crowd."

The album contains a hidden instrumental song at track 44, following 29 tracks of silence.

== Track listing ==
1. "Get a Job" (Tran)
2. "The Hearing Song" (Tran/Lohrbach)
3. "She Said..." (Lohrbach)
4. "My Friends Suck" (Tran)
5. "Alternative Girl" (Tran)
6. "Wanna-Be" (Tran)
7. "Surfer Girl" (Lohrbach)
8. "Ubotherme" (Tran)
9. "Face in the Crowd" (Tran)
10. "I Hate Myself" (Tran)
11. "One Night Stand" (Tran)
12. "Impotency" (Tran)
13. "Worthless"
14. "Employer's Market" (Lohrbach)
15. "S.F.L.B."
44. untitled hidden track

== Personnel ==
- John "Johnee Trash" Tran - guitar, vocals
- Ian "Slur" Cone - guitar, vocals
- Adam "Adumb" Lohrbach - bass, vocals
- Bob Herco - drums
- Pat Gowan - backing vocals

== Album information ==
- Record label: Liberation Records
- Recorded at Westbeach Recorders in Hollywood, California
- Engineered by Steve Kravac
- Mixed and produced by Home Grown and Steve Kravac
- CD cover and back tray art by Ron Ruvalcava Jr.
- Disc artwork by Evans and Theos
- Layout by Mean Street Graphics and Home Grown
