= Sessions (This Condition EP) =

EP by This Condition
- Released: April 23, 2013 (US)
- Recorded: 2012–2013
- Genre: Pop rock, acoustic
- Producer: Nick Zinnanti, John Naclerio, Tim Segado

This Condition chronology
Spirit (2010)	Sessions (2013)

Sessions is This Condition's fourth EP, a seven-track album recorded in over 2012–2013. Written by the band in a session with Ace Enders, it was recorded over three different sessions. It was released on April 23, 2013, through online retailers and digital music stores (iTunes). The album includes new recorded piano versions of 'Take, Take, Take' and 'Lost'.

== Track listing ==
No.	Title	Writer(s)	Producer(s)	Length
1.	"Money"	Nate Cyphert, Mike McGovern, Stephen Conley	John Naclerio, This Condition	3:31
2.	"Die"	Cyphert, Ace Enders	Naclerio, This Condition	3:16
3.	"Near"	Cyphert, McGovern	Nick Zinnanti, This Condition	3:41
4.	"Believe"	Cyphert, McGovern, Conley	Zinnanti, This Condition	3:42
5.	"You Don't"	Cyphert, McGovern, Enders	Zinnanti, This Condition	4:00
6.	"Take, Take, Take (Piano Version)"	Cyphert	Tim Segado, This Condition	4:20
7.	"Lost (Piano Version)"	Cyphert, McGovern	Segado, This Condition	4:12

== Personnel ==
=== Band members ===
- Nathan Cyphert – Vocals, Acoustic Guitar
- Mike McGovern – Guitar, Mandolin
- Nick Cantatore – Bass
- Devin Passariello – Drums
- Stephen Conley – Guitar, Backing Vocals
- Chris Castellino – Keyboard, Backing Vocals

=== Production ===
- Tracks 1–2 Recorded, Mixed and Mastered by John Naclerio at Nada Studios
- Tracks 3–5 Recorded and Mixed by Nick Zinnanti at Zin Studios and Mastered by John Naclerio at Nada Studios
- Tracks 6–7 Recorded and Mixed by Tim Segado at Hofstra University and Mastered by Stephen Conley

All songs written by This Condition except "Die" and "You Don’t", written by This Condition and Ace Enders
