= Rob Freeman =

American musician and record producer

Robert Andrew Freeman (born March 26, 1981, in Andover, New Jersey) is the guitarist, backing vocalist and primary songwriter for the pop punk/post-hardcore group Hidden in Plain View. He also owns/works at The Pilot Studio as a record producer.

== Biography ==
=== Hidden in Plain View ===
Upon forming in August 2000, Hidden in Plain View began playing concerts somewhat frequently. Freeman, from Stanhope, New Jersey, joined other musicians from North Jersey in establishing the band. After graduating high school, the band released their debut EP Find (2001) independently and their sophomore EP Operation: Cut-Throat (2002) on Note to Self Records and re-released by LLR Recordings.

Following several line-up changes, Drive-Thru Records signed the band in June 2003 and released their four-song sampler EP Hidden in Plain View on November 11, 2003. With more sophisticated lyrics and a heavier undertone in the instrumentation, it served as a prelude to their following full-length album.

In mid-2004, Hidden in Plain View went into the studio with producer Jim Wirt to record their full-length debut Life in Dreaming. Song structures were more diverse, featuring riff heavy anthems as well as melancholy ballads, as were the lyrical topics, dealing with the pressure of growing up ("American Classic"), the experience of losing a close friend ("In Memory") and the controversial subject of date rape ("Bleed for You"). Life in Dreaming was also the first of the band's records that integrated Freeman as a full vocalist with almost as many parts as lead vocalist Reo in certain songs, such as "A Minor Detail", "Garden Statement" and "Top 5 Addictions".

The follow-up album to Life in Dreaming was recorded in 2006 and released in 2007. On January 29, 2007, it was announced via the label's website that the band had broken up.

=== Record production ===
In 2004 Freeman's studio took on the name The Pilot Studio when he began producing a variety of projects.

== Discography ==
=== Producer ===
- Foster – The Demo (2002)
- Houston Calls – 4 Song Sampler (2003)
- State Unfair –Demos (2003)
- Sleepwell – Coin Operated Entertainment (2003)
- Royden – Best Friends Our Worst Enemies (2004)
- Maverick – Caught in the Negatives (2004)
- The Letter You –Free from Everything (2005)
- Sound the Alarm – Sound the Alarm (2006)
- P.R.Y.D.E. – Drowning Between Life and Lies EP (2006)
- Someday Never – The Natural Trend of Breathing EP (2006)
- Hometown Anthem – If We Could Dream (2006)
- The Fallback – This City Story EP (2006)
- Hand Me Down Buick – The Greater the Risk (2006)
- Sayrelin – We've Come to the Conclusion (2006)
- SunSets North – Return To Sender (2007)
- Parade The Day – To Keep Us Moving (2007)
- Late Night Habit – 'The Single Life' (2009)
- Hit The Lights – 'Skip School Start Fights' (2009)
- Armor For Sleep – 'EP' (2009)
- Voted Most Random – 'Everything You Want and More' (2010)
- Hartford – 'Room 207' (2010)
- Royal – Royal EP (2010)
- Ally Burnett – 'The Takeover EP' 'The Seven' (2010) 'The Heartbreaker Sampler' (2011)
- The Spin Room – 'The Dreams We Keep' (2010) 'Forever & Ever & Ever After' (2012)
- All The Right Moves – 'When Your Compass Breaks' (2012)
- Like Crazy – 'A Short Story' EP (2013)
- Novelty – 'With Room to Grow' (2014)
- Hampton Hollow – 'Hampton Hollow' (2017)
- Today Is... – 'Ahh The Joys of Mortgaging Your Future' (2020)
- Anxious Club – 'Midnight at Smoke Permanent' (2021)
