= YouInSeries =

American post-hardcore band

- Origin: Las Vegas, Nevada, United States
- Genres: Post-hardcore
- Years active: 2003–2008
- Labels: Equal Vision

YouInSeries was an American post-hardcore band from Las Vegas, Nevada.

== History ==
The group formed in 2003 composed of singer Kyle Lobeck, drummer Cheyne Smith, and guitarist John McClain (aka EggRoll) under the name Brown Eyed Deception. They gained bassist Jacob Kirkegard in July and guitarist Logan Lanning almost five months after that. In May 2005 John left the band to pursue other options in life and soon after the band gained guitarist Chris Davila, also known as Critter. The group toured the US extensively in 2004 and 2005 before signing with Equal Vision Records in December 2005. Brian McTernan produced their debut, Outside We Are Fine, released in May 2006. On June 2, 2006, the group was named SPIN Band of the Day. They toured later in 2006 with Circa Survive, and following this, Smith and Lanning left the group. Daniel replaced Smith on drums and Kevin Ryan (ex-Versus the Mirror) replaced Lanning on guitar. Then in late 2007, Daniel left the band and was replaced by Chris's brother Bryan. On January 24, 2008, it was announced that the band was disbanding.

== Members ==
Current members

- Kyle Lobeck-vocals
- Chris Davila-guitar
- Jacob Kirkegard-bass
- Bryan Davila-drums
- Kevin Ryan-guitar

Former members

- John McClain-guitar
- Cheyne Smith-drums
- Logan Lanning-guitar, vocals
- Daniel Conway-drums

== Discography ==
- Outside We Are Fine (Equal Vision, 2006)
