= Jenoah =

- Origin: Redlands, California, United States
- Genres: Alternative rock Indie rock Emo; Punk; Post-hardcore
- Label: Drive-Thru Records

Jenoah was an American indie rock band from Redlands, California, United States. Some sources say nearby San Bernardino. They were signed to Drive-Thru Records through November 2006. On November 30, 2006, the band announced via MySpace that they had broken up.

== Discography ==
Morning Is When Jenoah Wakes Up

Studio album by Jenoah
- Recorded: Love Juice Labs, Riverside, California
- Genre: Alternative rock, Punk rock
- Length: 24:15
- Label: Drive-Thru Records
- Producer: Dave Swanson; Jenoah

=== Morning Is When Jenoah Wakes Up ===
Shortly after being signed to Drive-Thru Records, Jenoah digitally released the EP, Morning Is When Jenoah Wakes Up, as the first of two free downloadable EPs (the second being hellogoodbye's Hellogoodbye) on the label's homepage. The physical release was issued later with two bonus songs. The album's cover art comes from a photo published on page 130 of the February 1966 issue of Playboy magazine.

==== Track listing ====
All songs written by Jenoah.

1. "Wish for Alliance" – 2:51
2. "Ex-Suits" – 3:58
3. "Openly" – 3:33
4. "Coughing Up Blood" – 3:23
5. "Jamie" – 3:11

Bonus tracks

1. "Wish For Alliance (Alternate Version)" – 3:03
2. "Ex-Suits (Alternate Version)" – 4:16

==== Credits ====
- Zachary Blizzard – drums, percussion, Vibra-Tones
- Robbie Halbert – Guitar, Moog
- Stephen Joshua Martinez – vocals, bass
- MC – Guitar, vocal

== See also ==
- Drive-Thru Records
