= An Angle =

American indie rock band

- Origin: Sacramento, California, U.S.
- Genres: Indie rock
- Years active: 2000–2008
- Labels: Drive-Thru, UnderAcloud
- Members: Kris Anaya; Matt Sergent; Dan Block; Aram Deradoorian; Trevor Church
- Website: anangle.net

An Angle was an American indie rock band from Sacramento, California. At the center of this group was singer-songwriter Kris Anaya. The band signed to Drive-Thru Records in September 2004. In March 2007, the band went on a tour of the US, leading up to June 12, 2007, release of The Truth Is That You Are Alive. On November 15, 2007, a music video was released for "Clean and Gold". In April 2008, the band appeared at the Bamboozle Left festival. On Monday, July 20, 2008, Matt Sergent announced via the group's Myspace page that the members of An Angle had decided to go their separate ways. In April 2013, it was announced that An Angle would be playing a reunion show for Sacramento's Launch Festival Kick Off Party 2013.

== Members ==
- Kris Anaya – vocals, lead and rhythm guitars
- Matt Sergent – vocals, bass
- Trevor Church – vocals, rhythm and lead guitars
- Aram Deradoorian – drums, vocals
- Dan Block – vocals, keyboards, trombone

== Discography ==
=== Albums ===
- And Take It with a Grain of Salt (2002/2004)
- We Can Breathe under Alcohol (2005)
- The Truth Is That You Are Alive (2007)

=== EPs ===
- 5 Days 5 Songs (2006)

=== Non-album tracks ===
- "A Song for Meghan" – released on Songs to Shoot up to, a split record with Mike Sparks (2004)
- "War Is Over" – released on Happy Holidays from Drive-Thru Records (2004)
