= Caught Inside (band) =

American Punk Band

Caught Inside was a four-member punk band originally from Miami, Florida. They played a lot at Cheers, a punk rock club in Miami, Florida. They were an active band from Winter 1994 until Winter of 2000. Most notably, they were signed to Drive-Thru Records after Stephanie and Richard Reines heard their 1998 EP Bolts in the Machine. Richard Reines calls this release the unofficial DTR No. 9, but the Bolts in the Machine EP was never sold with a drive-thru Logo. After their departure from Drive-Thru the band recorded a full-length CD before breaking up in 2000. Since their breakup they have played a few shows together in the Miami Area.
