= We Don't Have to Be Alone =

EP by This Condition
- Released: November 18, 2008 (US)
- Recorded: 2008
- Genre: Rock, Pop rock
- Length: 20:22
- Producer: Anthony Santonocito

This Condition chronology
We Don't Have to Be Alone (2008)	Spirit (2010)

We Don't Have to Be Alone is This Condition's second release, a five-song EP, recorded in August/September 2008. It was released on November 18, 2008 through online retailers and digital music stores (iTunes). Recorded in Hicksville, NY's Killingsworth Studios under producer Anthony Santonocito, the album features a new recording of "Red Letter", previously only released in a demo. The song "Barefoot (Steve's Song)" contains a hidden, sing-along track after the conclusion of the song, of a group of people singing the chorus to the first song on the album, The Timing.

== Tracks ==
1. "The Timing" - 3:09
2. "Red Letter" - 3:41
3. "Some Nights Just Feel Right" - 4:01
4. "I'm No Hero" - 4:16
5. "Barefoot (Steve's Song)" - 5:15
