= Allister =

American pop-punk band

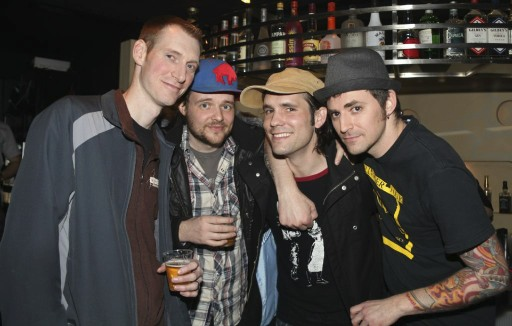
- Allister in 2012. From L to R: Mike Leverence, Kyle Lewis, Scott Murphy, Tim Rogner

Background information
- Also known as: Phineas Gage (1994–1997); Pheanus Peenus (1997–1999)
- Origin: Chicago, Illinois, U.S.
- Genre: Pop-punk · skate punk (early)
- Years active: 1994–2007; 2010–present
- Labels: Drive-Thru, Universal J
- Spinoffs: Scott & Rivers; The Get Go
- Members: Tim Rogner; Scott Murphy; Kyle Lewis; Mike Leverence
- Past members: John Hamada; Eric Mueller; David Rossi; Chris Rogner

Allister is an American pop-punk band from Chicago, Illinois. The four-piece formed in 1994 as Phineas Gage when the original band members were still in high school. In 1998, Allister became one of the first bands to sign to Drive-Thru Records. They went on hiatus in 2007, then reunited in 2010, and have been touring and recording again since. They have released five studio albums: Dead Ends and Girlfriends (1999), Last Stop Suburbia (2002), Before the Blackout (2005), Countdown to Nowhere (2010) and Life Behind Machines (2012). The band also made a cameo appearance in the 2004 film Sleepover.

== History ==
=== Commercial success (2002–2007) ===
With the aid of producer Chris Fudurich, the band recorded their second full-length album Last Stop Suburbia in 2002, showcasing a certain degree of growth in the songwriting of Rogner and Murphy. The album featured several fan-favorites, such as "Radio Player", "Overrated", and "Somewhere on Fullerton" (an ode to the legendary Chicago punk venue, Fireside Bowl), though the band had to part ways with both Rossi and Chris Rogner, who would concentrate on his own band August Premier. The following year, the band added Kyle Lewis (guitar) – formerly of Showoff, Now She's Gone, and The Fold – and Mike Leverence (drums), formerly of PARR5. Last Stop Suburbia reached No. 9 on the Billboard Heatseekers chart. The song "Somewhere on Fullerton" was featured in Disney's Extreme Skate Adventure.

In 2004, Allister toured the world (including Europe and Japan) and scored a small guest appearance on the big screen in the film Sleepover, before releasing their third album Before The Blackout (2005) and supporting it by co-headlining the "Before the Blackout, after the Breakup Tour" with Fenix*TX.

In 2006, the group was invited to a two and a half-month tour of Japan with Japanese band Ellegarden, with whom they had become friends while playing together at the SXSW music festival in Austin, Texas. The tour consisted of 40 sold-out shows all over Japan. At this time, the group released a cover EP titled Guilty Pleasures, on which Murphy sang half of the songs in Japanese. Before the departure, Rogner learned that he was becoming a father and made the decision to take a job where he was more available to his family. As such, Allister decided to go on hiatus following one final Japanese tour that the band had already committed to in the spring of 2007 – for which former Allister member Chris Rogner took his brother's place – and a final farewell show in Chicago at The Metro on 20 July 2007, at which Tim Rogner returned to perform. Former member John "Johnny" Hamada returned to sing backing vocals on the final song, "Somewhere on Fullerton", as well as other members of support bands Punchline and The Fold.

=== Breakup and side projects (2007–2010) ===
Soon after, Murphy and Lewis went on to start the band The Get Go with friends and former members of bands Home Grown and Mest. The Get Go released 2 records and toured the UK and Japan, but due to conflicting schedules has since ceased activity.

In 2008, Scott Murphy signed as a solo artist to the label Universal Music in Japan, recording his debut solo album, Guilty Pleasures II, as a continuation of the band's past work. The album contains a number of Japanese and English songs. On the album's release date, "Scott Murphy" was the number 1 searched word on Google in Japan. Murphy released another follow-up EP, Guilty Pleasures 3, on 3 December 2008. Guilty Pleasures 3 was certified Gold by the Recording Industry Association of Japan (RIAJ) for shipment of 100,000 copies on 10 September 2009 and Guilty Pleasures II was also certified Gold by RIAJ on 10 December 2009. Throughout the following years, he released several more albums in the "Guilty Pleasures" series, including: Guilty Pleasures Love, Guilty Pleasures 4, Guilty Pleasures Animation, Guilty Pleasures Christmas and Guilty Pleasures Thriller, a track for track rock cover of the Michael Jackson album Thriller.

In 2010, Murphy began working on a project with alternative rock band Weezer's frontman Rivers Cuomo entitled Scott & Rivers. The pair met in Los Angeles in 2010, and soon began writing and recording an album of original songs sung in Japanese. They share lead vocal duties and play guitar in the group. They played their first show at the Countdown Japan Festival in Chiba on 31 December 2012, as the first non-Japanese act to perform at the 10-year-old festival. They released a full-length album, Scott & Rivers, in 2013.

In 2012, Rogner recorded and released a solo acoustic EP entitled "The Ravenswood Sessions."

=== Reunion and recent events (2010–present) ===
Allister announced their intention to reunite in the spring of 2010, and the band broke their hiatus at the Bamboozle Festival in Chicago on 2010 May 15 at the Charter One Pavilion. They recorded and released their 4th full-length album Countdown to Nowhere on Universal Music Japan on 16 July 2010. In 2012, Allister recorded and released their 5th full-length album entitled Life Behind Machines, and promoted its release with a tour of Japan and their first ever tour of China. In 2014, Allister toured the United States playing dates with MxPx and Showoff. Former Allister members Chris Rogner and Eric Mueller have both been playing in new bands, Rogner in Hey Einstein and Mueller in We've Got Ours.

On 19 December 2018, Tim Rogner announced that the band would release a new record to commemorate the 20th anniversary of the release of You Can't Do that on Vinyl. The record, called 20 Years and Counting, is a "20 song compilation that features songs from previous records as well as four brand new tracks." Since Allister did not own the recording licenses for songs on its first three records, but owned the rights to the songs themselves, the band re-recorded and "re-imagined" some of them. A video for the re-recording of "Somewhere on Fullerton" was released on YouTube the same day as Rogner's announcement. The new record was officially released through Universal Japan on 30 January 2019, available digitally via iTunes and Google Play.

On 24 September 2025, it was announced that the band will play Slam Dunk Festival 2026 in the United Kingdom. The band will play Slam Dunk South on 23 May 2026 and Slam Dunk North on 24 May 2026. These appearances mark the band's first return to the United Kingdom since 2013 when they last played the festival.

== Band members ==
Current members

- Tim Rogner – backing and lead vocals (1994–2007, 2010–present) drums (1994–2000); rhythm and lead guitar (2000–2007, 2010–present)
- Scott Murphy – bass guitar, lead and backing vocals (1998–2007, 2010–present)
- Kyle Lewis – lead guitar, backing vocals (2003–2007, 2010–present)
- Mike Leverence – drums (2003–2007, 2010–present)

Former members

- John Hamada – lead guitar, backing and lead vocals (1994–2002); backing vocals (touring guest 20 July 2007)
- Eric Mueller – bass guitar, backing vocals (1996–1998); rhythm guitar, backing and lead vocals (1998–2000)
- David "Dave" Rossi – drums (2000–2003, touring guest spring 2014)
- Chris Rogner – lead guitar, backing vocals (2002–2003, touring substitute 20 July 2007, touring guest spring 2014); rhythm guitar, lead vocals (touring substitute 20 July 2007)

Session guests

- Ariel Rechtshaid – guitar on "Waiting for You" from Last Stop Suburbia (2002)

Timeline

== Discography ==
Studio albums

- Dead Ends and Girlfriends (1999)
- Last Stop Suburbia (2002)
- Before the Blackout (2005)
- Countdown to Nowhere (2010)
- Life Behind Machines (2012)

Compilation albums

- 20 Years and Counting (2019)

Extended plays

- 5 Song Demo Tape (1997)
- You Can't Do that on Vinyl (1998)
- Guilty Pleasures (2006)
- Second City Showdown (Split EP with Good 4 Nothing) (2010)
- You Still Can't Do That on Vinyl (2011)

=== Non-album tracks ===
- "My Little Needle" – released on A Tribute to Alkaline Trio (2012)
- "We Close Our Eyes" – released on the original soundtrack to Sleepover (2004)
- "Shima Uta" – released on the Japanese version of Before the Blackout (2005)
- "Walking the Plank" – released on Hair: Chicago Punk Cuts (2006)

=== Trivia ===
- "Somewhere on Fullerton" from Last Stop Suburbia was featured in the video game Disney's Extreme Skate Adventure, while "Scratch" and "Flypaper" from the same album were featured in Project Gotham Racing 2.
- On the booklet from Allisters album, "Last Stop Suburbia" the band includes a Thank You section, one of the people thanked is Brian Peterson, a person affiliated with The Fireside Bowl on Fullerton avenue in Logan Square, Chicago.

=== Music videos ===
Name	Year
Somewhere on Fullerton	2002
A Lotta Nerve	2005
Free	2010
Run Away	2010
5 Years	2012
Stay With Me	2019

== See also ==
- Scott Murphy
- Scott & Rivers
- Drive-Thru Records
