= Act Your Age (Home Grown album) =

Studio album by Home Grown
- Released: June 2, 1998
- Genre: Ska punk; pop-punk; skate punk
- Length: 69:02
- Label: Outpost Recordings
- Producer: Clif Norrell

Home Grown chronology
That's Business (1995)	Act Your Age (1998)	EP Phone Home (Home Grown EP) (1999)

Singles from Act Your Age
- 1. "All That You Have/She's Anti (Promo Only)" Released: 1998; 2. "Surfer Girl" Released: May 18, 1998; 3. "Suffer" Released: 1998

Professional ratings
Review scores
Source	Rating
AllMusic	3.5/5 stars
Los Angeles Times	**
Punknews.org	4/5 stars

Act Your Age is the second album by the rock band Home Grown, released in 1998 by Outpost Recordings. It was the band's only album for a major label. It expanded their popularity and found them moving into a pop punk and pop rock direction musically. The album's most popular tracks were a new version of "Surfer Girl," a song which had originally appeared on their debut album That's Business and "Suffer" which also appeared on Geffen sampler Everything is Beautiful. Act Your Age would be the band's final recording with their original lineup, as guitarist Ian Cone left the band shortly after its release.

The album contains a hidden track called "Too Many Stops" on track 15 after "Reflections." The song plays at 22:59 into the track and is followed by a 1-minute clip of the band members laughing uncontrollably.

Act Your Age was Home Grown's first album to chart; reaching #24 on Billboard's Heatseekers in 1998.

== Track listing ==
No.	Title	Writer(s)	Length
1.	"Nowhere Slow"	Adam Lohrbach	3:04
2.	"All That You Have"	Adam Lohrbach	1:51
3.	"She's Anti"	John Tran	3:13
4.	"Surfer Girl"	Adam Lohrbach	4:31
5.	"Last Nite Regrets"	John Tran	3:30
6.	"Suffer"	Adam Lohrbach	3:47
7.	"Your Past"	John Tran	4:05
8.	"Grow Up"	Adam Lohrbach	3:05
9.	"Piss Off"	John Tran	2:45
10.	"Let Go"	Adam Lohrbach	2:26
11.	"Bad News Blair"	John Tran	2:20
12.	"Kids"	Adam Lohrbach	3:09
13.	"Wow, She Dumb"	John Tran	3:16
14.	"Envy Me"	John Tran	2:13
15.	"Reflections"	Adam Lohrbach	4:04
16.	"Stop Song"	Adam Lohrbach	2:37

== Personnel ==
- John "John E. Trash" Tran – vocals, guitar, moog, keyboard
- Ian Cone – guitar, vocals
- Adam Lohrbach – vocals, bass, moog, keyboard
- Bob Herco – drums

== Album information ==
- Recorded at Ocean Way Studios, Sound City Studios, and Louie's Clubhouse
- Mixed at Louie's Clubhouse
- Produced, engineered, and mixed by Clif Norrell
- Assistant engineers: John Sorensen, Greg Fidelman, Victor Janacua
- Mastered by Howie Weinberg at Masterdisk in New York
- Tracks 1, 2, 4, 6, 8, 10, 12 & 15 written by Adam Lohrbach
- Tracks 3, 5, 7, 9, 11, 13 & 14 written by John Tran
- Art direction by Pawn Shop Press
- Cover photo by Stephen Stickler
- Other photography by Alison Dyer
