= Socratic (band) =

American rock band

- Origin: Cranford/Linden, New Jersey, US
- Genres: Alternative rock, indie rock, emo, emo pop, pop punk
- Years active: 1999–2014
- Label: Drive-Thru Records
- Members: Duane Okun; Thomas Stratton; Lou Panico; Kevin Bryan; Vincent D'Amico
- Past members: Adam Swider; Christian Mazza; Patrick Tobin; Mike Neglia; Ryan McNulty; Greg Scalera; Christopher Grzan

Socratic was an American rock band from Cranford and Linden, New Jersey. After signing to Drive-Thru Records in 2004, they released their debut full-length Lunch for the Sky in 2005, the Just Turn EP in 2006, Mark Hoppus-produced follow-up album Spread The Rumors in 2008 and their self-produced self-titled album Socratic (The Album) in 2012. Socratic toured throughout their entire tenure performing in Japan, Australia, and the continental United States.

== History ==
Socratic formed in 1999 by childhood friends Kevin Bryan (lead vocals and guitar) and Thomas Stratton (drums). Bryan's high school classmate Patrick Tobin joined the band on bass in November that year. Shortly thereafter the band recorded (their self-released debut) "Socratic EP" and added Duane Okun as lead guitarist and backup vocalist. Tobin left in late 2001 and was replaced by bassist Adam Swider.

In 2002 the band were signed to No Milk Records and on January 6, 2003, released their second EP It's Getting Late. The band then formally signed to California label Drive-Thru Records in 2004 and put out their first full-length album, Lunch for the Sky (September 2005). The album was produced by John Goodmanson (Hot Hot Heat, Sleater-Kinney, The Blood Brothers) at Longview Farms Studio in rural Western Massachusetts. In the month preceding the album's release, the band toured the US with Near Miss, the Cover and the Vacancy. At this time the band added Vincent D'Amico on piano which heavily influenced the band's sound.

Swider left the band in May 2006 and was replaced by bassist Lou Panico. In June 2006, the band supported the Forecast on their headlining US tour. In December 2006, a free 5-track EP entitled Just Turn was made available for download from the band's Myspace and PureVolume profiles. Their next full-length album entitled "Spread The Rumors" (produced by Mark Hoppus of blink-182 and +44) was released on May 6, 2008, and was recorded in Mark Hoppus and Travis Barker's recording studio in California.

In 2010, founding member Kevin Bryan left the band to focus on his career as co-owner/recording project coordinator at Soundwaves Studios in Union, New Jersey.

In 2011, drummer Thomas Stratton and former guitarist Kevin Bryan opened 10th Street Live, a music venue and bar in Kenilworth, New Jersey.

The band released a self-titled and self-produced followup online in 2012. With no set prices, they encouraged fans to pay what they thought the record was worth.

Duane Okun and Lou Panico continue to write music and perform with the band Levy and the Oaks in Asbury Park, New Jersey.

The band announced in May of 2025 that they are reuniting for a show in Asbury Park to celebrate the 20th anniversary of Lunch for the Sky.

== Discography ==
=== Albums ===
- Lunch for the Sky (2005)
- Spread the Rumors (2008)
- Socratic (2012)

=== EPs ===
- It's Getting Late (2002)
- Just Turn (2006)

=== Singles ===
- "Boy in a Magazine" (2008)

=== Non-album tracks ===
- "Funeral Masses for William Jennings: Viewing Hours (4-6)" – released on Bands You Love, Have Heard of, and Should Know (2005)
- "Tonight I'll Be Staying Here with You" (Bob Dylan cover) – released on Listen to Bob Dylan: A Tribute (2005)

A Christmas Coal Coral (Featuring Rendez Vous) - A Christmas track released December 2008.
