= House of Fools (band) =

American band

- Origin: Greensboro, North Carolina, U.S.
- Genres: Rock, indie rock
- Years active: 2004–present
- Members: Josh King; David McLaughlin; Joel Kiser; Matt Bowers; Jordan Powers; Jack Foster
- Past members: Phil Bell; Jeff Linn; David McLaughlin
- Website: http://www.houseoffools.net

House of Fools is an American rock band from Greensboro, North Carolina, United States. Members include Josh King (vocals/acoustic guitar), David McLaughlin (guitar), Joel Kiser (guitar), Matt Bowers (keyboard), Jordan Powers (ex- Far-Less) (bass) and Jack Foster (drums).

House of Fools formed in 2004, from a demo recording made by King and Bowers. At the time King was the lead singer and keyboardist for The Necessary.

The Necessary was an indie/emo/rock band from Greensboro, with the same members as House of Fools, minus Bowers and Scifres and with David McLaughlin (ex-guitarist/vocalist of House of Fools), Todd Turner (ex-drummer of the band Far-Less) playing drums, and Jeff Linn (ex-bassist of House of Fools) playing bass. Influenced by bands like Jimmy Eat World, The Necessary wrote a wide range of songs released in 2004 on the album This Is Us, for Forsaken Records. The Necessary grew to have a large fanbase in Greensboro.

A friend of the band sent demos that Bowers and King had recorded under the name House of Fools to Drive-Thru Records. In November 2004, King was contacted by Drive-Thru Records and was flown out to discuss a record deal.

Drive-Thru Records agreed to sign House of Fools to a record deal. The line-up was completed by the rest of The Necessary, while, due to band-internal issues, Todd Turner was replaced by Phil Bell. They released a self-titled EP in October 2006. They ended the year touring the East Coast with Paulson. In January and February 2007, they supported Daphne Loves Derby on their headlining acoustic tour.

After the release of their first album, recorded and produced by R. Walt Vincent in his Los Angeles studio, they were named to Alternative Press's list of "100 Bands You Need To Know".

On December 19, 2008, the band announced on their Myspace page that 2008 had "been a rough year for House of Fools." After writing and recording about 30 new songs, the band's drummer, Phil Bell, left the band for medical reasons. Bell has had degenerative disc disease for years, and lately the members all realized that although he "has always pulled through, with talk of surgery and the possibility of paralysis, Phil is too young to continue long and strenuous drives in a van on tour and playing drums every night." Therefore, the band searched for a new drummer.

On March 12, the band announced that their new drummer would be Jack Foster, and that their bassist, Jeff "Salsa" Linn, was slowly transitioning out of the band. The band was able to find a replacement in Jordan Powers, longtime friend of the band and former guitarist of Far-less.

On January 17 an official press release was posted on the band's new website, www.houseoffools.net. The band announced that they had finally severed ties with Drive-Thru Records and were planning to release their long-awaited second album in the spring or summer of 2011.

House of Fools released their long-awaited second album, Versus The Beast, on December 30, 2011.

Near the end of 2012, guitarist and vocalist David McLaughlin announced he was leaving the band. He has been replaced by Tommy Scifres.

== Discography ==
=== Albums ===
- Live and Learn (2007)
- Versus the Beast (2011)

=== EPs ===
- House of Fools (2006)

=== Non-album tracks ===
- "Blowin' in the Wind" – released on Listen to Bob Dylan: A Tribute (2005)
- "Tricky Treats" – featured on the band's MySpace
