= Drive-Thru Records =

American record label

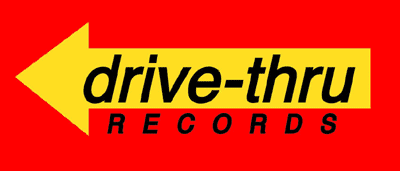
- Founder: Richard Reines, Stefanie Reines
- Status: Inactive
- Distributors: Universal, Sony, RED
- Genre: Pop punk, emo, indie rock, post-hardcore
- Country of origin: United States
- Location: Sherman Oaks, California, Woodland Hills, California, Santa Monica, California
- Official website: https://drive-thrurecords.com/

Drive-Thru Records logo used on Allister's You Can't Do that on Vinyl

Drive-Thru Records is a California-based independent record label owned by siblings Richard and Stefanie Reines. The label was partially responsible for popularizing the pop-punk/emo merger sound of the early to mid-2000s. After facing financial obstacles in getting their bands' music into stores, Drive-Thru entered into a distribution deal with MCA/Universal. In 2003 MCA was dissolved and folded into Geffen Records. One of the clauses of that agreement was MCA/Geffen being able to sign any band of their choosing from Drive-Thru's roster.

Once the Universal deal ended, they signed a contract with independent label Sanctuary Records. Starting with a new roster, the label garnered a top 10 platinum hit with "Here In Your Arms" by Hellogoodbye. However, Sanctuary was on the verge of bankruptcy, and sold their assets to Universal Music. Drive-Thru Records got trapped in that deal, and were stuck with UMG, the catalog division of Universal. The label's last release was in 2008, when Richard and Stefanie Reines decided to concentrate on artist management and put Drive-Thru Records on indefinite hiatus.

The independent label sold over 7 million CDs. Bands that achieved notable success during their time with the label include Hellogoodbye, New Found Glory, Something Corporate, Fenix*TX, Finch, The Starting Line, Steel Train, Midtown, Rx Bandits, The Early November, Senses Fail, Home Grown, Halifax and Allister.

== Love Minus Zero Recordings ==
Love Minus Zero Recordings was founded as the second subsidiary of Drive-Thru Records in January 2007. This label was intended to comprise artists of a stronger singer-songwriter genre. Only two acts were ever signed to Love Minus Zero: Roark and Biirdie. This imprint was soon reabsorbed back into Drive-Thru Records.

== Commercial Success ==
Drive-Thru Records have earned several silver, gold, and platinum albums and singles, that have been certified by RIAA, CRIA and BPI.

=== Certified Release ===
Year	Artist	Release	Sales
2000	New Found Glory	New Found Glory	UK: Silver; US: Gold
2002	New Found Glory	Sticks and Stones	UK Silver; US: Platinum; CAN: Gold
2002	The Starting Line	"The Best Of Me"	US: Gold
2004	New Found Glory	Catalyst	US: Gold
2006	Hellogoodbye	"Here (In Your Arms)"	US: Platinum

== List of former bands ==
- Adelphi *
- Allister
- An Angle *
- The Benjamins *
- Biirdie
- Cousin Oliver *
- The Cover * †
- Dave Melillo
- Day at the Fair * †
- The Early November
- Fenix TX
- Finch
- Halifax
- Hellogoodbye
- Hidden in Plain View
- Home Grown
- House of Fools
- Houston Calls * †
- I Am the Avalanche
- I Can Make a Mess Like Nobody's Business
- Jenoah *
- Last Summer *
- Madison * †
- Midtown
- Morning Call
- MotherMania
- The Movielife
- New Found Glory
- Roark *
- Rx Bandits
- Say No More *
- Secret Secret Dino Club
- Self Against City * †
- Senses Fail
- Socratic
- Something Corporate *
- The Starting Line
- Steel Train *
- The Stellar Life *
- The Track Record * †

* denotes inactive band. † denotes former Rushmore Records signee.

== Release catalog ==
This is the release list of Drive-Thru Records in order of release number.

1. Cousin Oliver – (818) (1997)
2. Various Artists – Where's the Beef? (1997)
3. Riverfenix – Riverfenix (1997)
4. Various Artists – A Punk & Ska Christmas Gone Wrong (1997)
5. The Pharmaceutical Bandits – Those Damn Bandits (1998)
6. Allister – You Can't Do that on Vinyl 7" vinyl (1998)
7. Various Artists – Mulletcore (1998)
8. Mothermania – The Sound and the Fury (1998)
9. Caught Inside – Bolts in the Machine EP (1998)
10. Rx Bandits – Halfway Between Here and There (1999)
11. Last Summer – Remember Those Days (1999)
12. Midtown – The Sacrifice of Life EP (1999)
13. New Found Glory – Nothing Gold Can Stay (1999)
14. Allister – Dead Ends and Girlfriends (1999)
15. Less Than Jake – Hello Rockview picture vinyl (1999)
16. Not used
17. Various Artists – You'll Never Eat Fast Food Again (1999)
18. Midtown – Save the World, Lose the Girl (2000)
19. New Found Glory – From the Screen to Your Stereo EP (2000)
20. Dashboard Confessional – The Swiss Army Romance (2000)
21. The Benjamins – The Art of Disappointment (2001)
22. Rx Bandits – Progress (2001)
23. The Starting Line – With Hopes of Starting Over EP (2001)
24. Finch – Falling into Place EP (2001)
25. Something Corporate – Audioboxer EP (2001)
26. The Movielife – The Movielife Has a Gambling Problem EP (2001)
27. Various Artists – Welcome to the Family (2001)
28. Finch – What It Is to Burn (2002)
29. Home Grown – 3 Song Sampler (2002)
30. Home Grown – Kings of Pop (2002)
31. The Starting Line – 3 Song Sampler (2002)
32. The Starting Line – Say It Like You Mean It (2002)
33. Allister – Last Stop Suburbia (2002)
34. The Early November – For All of This EP (2002)
35. The Early November – The Acoustic EP (2003)
36. Steel Train – For You My Dear EP (2003)
37. Inadvertently, there were two releases with the release number 37:
  - Various Artists – Drive-Thru 2002 Summer Invasion Compilation (2002)
  - The Movielife – Forty Hour Train Back to Penn (2003)
38. Senses Fail – From the Depths of Dreams EP (2003)
39. Rx Bandits – The Resignation (2003)
40. The Starting Line – The Make Yourself at Home EP (2003)
41. Various Artists – Drive-Thru Invasion Tour Compilation (2003)
42. The Early November – The Room's Too Cold (2003)
43. Hidden in Plain View – Hidden in Plain View EP (2003)
44. Steel Train – 1969 EP (2003)
45. Jenoah – Morning Is When Jenoah Wakes Up EP (2004)
46. Hellogoodbye – Hellogoodbye EP (2004)
47. New Found Glory – Catalyst (2004)
48. I Can Make a Mess Like Nobody's Business – I Can Make a Mess Like Nobody's Business (2004)
49. Home Grown – When It All Comes Down EP (2004)
50. An Angle – And Take It with a Grain of Salt (2004)
51. Various Artists – Happy Holidays from Drive-Thru Records (2004)
52. Halifax – A Writer's Reference EP (2005)
53. Various Artists – Drive Thru Records: Bands You Love, Have Heard of, and Should Know (2005)
54. Hidden in Plain View – Life in Dreaming (2005)
55. Steel Train – Twilight Tales from the Prairies of the Sun (2005)
56. An Angle – We Can Breathe under Alcohol (2005)
57. Adelphi – Walking on the Ceiling of the Sky EP (2005)
58. The Early November/I Am the Avalanche – Split (2005)
59. Various Artists – Listen to Bob Dylan: A Tribute (2005)
60. Socratic – Lunch for the Sky (2005)
61. I Am the Avalanche – I Am the Avalanche (2005)
62. The Early November – The Room's Too Cold re-release (2005)
63. Allister – Before the Blackout (2005)
64. Inadvertently, there were two releases with the release number 64:
  - Various Artists – Drive-Thru Records Greatest Hits (2005)
  - The Early November – 3 Song Sampler (2006)
65. Halifax – 3 Song Sampler (2006)
66. Halifax – The Inevitability of a Strange World (2006)
67. Dave Melillo – Talk Is Cheap EP (2006)
68. The Early November – The Mother, the Mechanic, and the Path (2006)
69. Hellogoodbye – Zombies! Aliens! Vampires! Dinosaurs! (2006)
70. House of Fools – House of Fools EP (2006)
71. Self Against City – Telling Secrets to Strangers (2007)
72. Hidden In Plain View – Resolution (2007)
73. House of Fools – Live and Learn (2007)
74. Inadvertently, there were two releases with the release number 74:
  - Socratic – Just Turn EP (2006)
  - An Angle – The truth is that you are alive (2007)
75. New Found Glory – From the Screen to Your Stereo Part II (2007)
76. Steel Train – Trampoline (2007)
77. Inadvertently, there were two releases with the release number 77:
  - Say No More – What You Thought You Knew (2007)
  - Ace Enders and A Million Different People – The Secret Wars EP (2008)
78. Hellogoodbye – EP/DVD Split (2008)
79. Hellogoodbye – Zombies! Aliens! Vampires! Dinosaurs! And More!(2008)
80. Say No More – What You Thought You Knew Bonus Track Edition (2008)
81. Socratic – Spread The Rumors (2008)
82. Not used
83. Houston Calls – The End of an Error (2008)
84. Various Artists – Drive-Thru Records Special Edition 26th Anniversary EP Box Set (2023)

=== DVD releases ===
- Drive-Thru Records DVD Vol.1 (2002)
- Drive-Thru Records DVD Vol.2: Spectacular, Spectacular (2003)
- Drive-Thru and Rushmore Records DVD Vol.3 (2005)
- Drive-Thru Records DVD Vol.4 (2006)
- "Hellogoodbye OMG HGB ROTFL"
