= Halifax (band) =

American punk band

- Origin: Thousand Oaks, California, U.S.
- Genres: Pop-punk, emo pop
- Years active: 2003–2010
- Members: Chris Brandt; Adam Charles; Eric Ivener; Tommy Guindon
- Past members: Justin Chlowitz; Dan Locascio; Matt Locascio; Kevin Donlon; Doug Peyton; Mike Hunau

Halifax is an American pop-punk band from Thousand Oaks, California. They formed in 2003 and are currently unsigned. Their 2004 EP A Writer's Reference has sold over 60,000 copies to date, after making a cameo appearance on MTV's The Real World: Austin. The band's second full-length album, The Inevitability of a Strange World, was released in May 2006 and charted on the Billboard 200 and debuted at number 1 on the Billboard Heatseekers. They also won MTV2's Dew Circuit Breakout competition later that year.

== History ==
The band Halifax started in Thousand Oaks, California. Dan Locascio, Matt Locascio, Justin Chlowitz and guitarist Chris Brandt would write songs at the Locascios' house. They later recruited vocalist Mike Hunau to form a full-time touring band. The Locascios' father came up with the name for the band while setting up a hockey tournament in Halifax, Nova Scotia, in which Dan Locascio and Justin Chlowitz were to be playing later that year. In February 2002, the band signed to ECA Records. After several months of occasional touring, Halifax recorded their eleven-song debut album within a week in March 2003. The self-produced and self-funded Start Back at Start was licensed and released in June 2003 by ECA Records.

The band's lineup then changed, with guitarist Adam Charles, bassist Kevin Donlon and drummer Tommy Guindon to replace Dan Locascio, Matt Locascio, and Justin Chlowitz. The new line-up recorded Halifax's second album, the self-produced EP A Writer's Reference, released on January 25, 2004, by No Milk Records. While Halifax's debut was much more reminiscent of the band's pop-punk influences—namely "Taking Back Sunday" and The Starting Line—their new material showcased a more distinctive style, mainly because of the line-up changes they had undergone. The quintet felt they had become a new band and retired the Start Back at Start catalog from their live shows. The group toyed with renaming the band, but eventually stuck with their already established moniker.

In 2004, Halifax enlisted Heath Miller of Excess dB Entertainment as their manager, marking a pivotal point in the band's career. Miller, a seasoned concert promoter and manager known for his work with emerging acts like My Chemical Romance and Fall Out Boy, brought his industry expertise to Halifax during the release of their EP A Writer's Reference. Under his guidance, the band secured a deal with Drive-Thru Records and expanded their touring schedule, including appearances on the Warped Tour and collaborations with bands such as Spitalfield and Rufio. Miller's strategic direction and industry connections played a significant role in elevating Halifax's presence in the pop-punk scene.

After Halifax toured with various Drive-Thru Records bands, they signed to the label in July 2004 after performing at Hellfest at Rexplex in Elizabeth, NJ. Bassist Donlon left the band. While Chlowitz was initially rumored to return, the vacant position on the bass was instead filled by temporary members or Hunau. A permanent replacement was not found until Doug Peyton joined the band in late 2005. Drive-Thru re-released A Writer's Reference, which had only been sporadically available in record stores, to the general public in January 2005, with new artwork and a bonus track. In May and June 2005, they toured with From First to Last, Emanuel and He Is Legend. International tours followed, such as the Drive-Thru Invasion Tours in Europe and Japan. In between, Halifax appeared on MTV's The Real World: Austin alongside hellogoodbye in a series of episodes about the South by Southwest music festival. The band was unhappy that they had been depicted in the episodes as a group of mindless drunks, but the exposure certainly helped spread the word about the band; it resulted in over one million plays on PureVolume. Following this, they went on an East Coast tour with Scary Kids Scaring Kids. In December 2005, the group went on a headlining tour with support from Punchline, I Am the Avalanche and The Fully Down.

In February 2006, the group went on Midwest and east coast tour with Paramore, My American Heart, and So They Say. In May 2006, Drive-Thru Records released Halifax's third album, which marked the first time the band worked with a record producer. The Inevitability of a Strange World was produced partially by Lou Giordano and partially by Machine, who had previously worked with such renowned bands as Armor for Sleep, The Goo Goo Dolls, Lamb of God, and Sunny Day Real Estate. Thanks to them, the album featured a much rawer sound, giving a slight nod to a variety of heavy metal acts (most notably in the song "Our Revolution", which lyrically and musically pays homage to Mötley Crüe's "Kickstart My Heart"). The Inevitability of a Strange World sold close to 7,000 copies within its first week, debuting at No. 130 on the Billboard 200 and at No. 1 on the Top Heatseekers chart. To promote the release, the band shot a music video for "Our Revolution", toured extensively and appeared on Last Call with Carson Daly on July 19, 2006, and on Fearless Music on September 23, 2006.

In December 2006, Halifax competed in the finals of MTV2's Dew Circuit Breakout, an annual TV battle of the bands sponsored by Mountain Dew, against Fallen from the Sky and Zolof the Rock & Roll Destroyer. Halifax placed first, following in the footsteps of hellogoodbye, who won the competition the year before. Due to a chronic knee injury, Payton left the band in January 2007. He was replaced by bassist Eric Ivener.

In 2007, the band completed tours of the United States and the United Kingdom with Madina Lake, Envy on the Coast and My American Heart. Their song "Nightmare" was featured in MLB 07: The Show.

In March 2008, the band performed at the South by So What?! festival. Mike Hunau left the band in April 2008. In the Summer of 2008 Halifax announced that they would be recording with Dwight Baker in Austin, Texas. The band uploaded many pictures and videos of them in the studio to their MySpace and YouTube channel, as well as a demo song "Perfect Life".

On January 8, 2009, the band announced their next album and their departure from Drive-Thru Records. On April 5, Halifax released "Snakeslide" and "My Restless Heart", the first two songs from this forthcoming album, unmastered and unmixed. In July the group released two more songs, "Tonight" and "No Saturation", also unmastered and unmixed. Halifax announced their next single "Breathe" on February 12, 2010. The album, a six-track EP entitled Align, was released on April 6, 2010. The band announced they were signed to Rocket Science Records on March 30, 2010.

== Musical style ==
Halifax's styles are emo rock, emo pop and pop-punk.

Reviewing The Inevitability of a Strange World, Scott Hefflon of Lollipop Magazine noted influences from 1980s rock, including power ballads and layered vocal harmonies. He compared elements of the album to Mötley Crüe and Taking Back Sunday.

Halifax also incorporated alternative rock and post-hardcore elements into their sound across their releases.

== Members ==
- Chris Brandt – vocals, guitar
- Adam Charles – guitar
- Eric Ivener – bass
- Tommy Guindon – drums

=== Former members ===
- Dan Locascio – guitar
- Justin Chlowitz – bass
- Matt Locascio – drums
- Kevin Donlon – bass
- Doug Peyton – bass
- Mike Hunau – vocals

== Discography ==
=== Albums ===
- Start Back at Start (2003)
- The Inevitability of a Strange World (2006)

=== EPs ===
- A Writer's Reference (2004, re-released in 2005)
- 3 Song Sampler (2006)
- The Inevitability of a Strange World B-Sides (2009)
- The Lost Tapes (2009)
- Align (2010)

=== Singles ===
From A Writer's Reference EP:

- "Sydney"

From The Inevitability of a Strange World:

- "Our Revolution"
- "Nightmare"

From Align EP:

- "Breathe"

=== Compilation tracks ===
- "Straight Up" (Paula Abdul cover) – released on Punk Goes 80's (2005)
- "Obsession" – released on the Japanese version of The Inevitability of a Strange World (2006)
- "Sydney" – released on Punk the Clock Vol. 1 (2004)
