= Home Grown =

American pop punk band

Background information
- Origin: Orange County, California, U.S.
- Genres: Pop-punk; punk rock; skate punk; alternative rock; ska punk
- Years active: 1994–2005; 2024–present
- Labels: Liberation; Outpost Recordings; Drive-Thru; Mutant League; Burning Heart
- Members: John Tran; Adam Lohrbach; Dan Hammond; Russell Dixon
- Past members: Ian Cone; Justin Poyser; Bob Herco; Darren Reynolds
- Website: https://www.homegrownpoppunk.com

Home Grown is an American punk rock band formed in 1994 in Orange County, California. They released three full-length albums and several EPs before disbanding in 2005.

In June 2024, the band reunited in Los Angeles, California for their first show in 19 years. Another show was announced in Pomona, California at the Glasshouse, which was the band's first headlining show since their reunion. On March 7, 2025, John Tran confirmed that the band was recording new music.

== Band history ==
=== Formation ===
Home Grown was formed in Orange County in 1994. The original recording lineup of the band consisted of John "John E. Trash" Tran on guitar and vocals, Adam "Adumb" Lohrbach on bass and vocals, Ian "Slur" Cone on guitar and backing vocals, and Bob Herco on drums. The quartet began experimenting with elements of punk rock, pop, surf and skate music, and humorous lyrics to craft their sound. They released their first album, That's Business, the following year through Liberation Records. Though rudimentary, the album established the band's presence in the prolific southern California music scene of the 1990s and included several songs that became fan favorites, such as "Surfer Girl" and "Face in the Crowd". The band played many shows in southern California and embarked on some of their first tours. In 1996, the EP Wusappaning?! was released by Swedish label Burning Heart Records.

=== Act Your Age and lineup changes ===
The band signed to major label Outpost Recordings and released its second album, Act Your Age, in 1998. It increased their popularity and they toured extensively in support of it. The album had peaked at #24 on Billboard's Heatseekers chart in 1998. During this era of the band, the song "We are Dumb" appeared on the soundtracks of movies Half Baked and Homegrown. Cone left the band shortly after and was replaced by Justin Poyser. This lineup released EP Phone Home in 1999, which included the punk version of aqua's Barbie Girl. Later that year they toured with the band Limbeck, with whom they recorded a split EP called Connection.

In March 2000, the band embarked on a US tour with Amazing Crowns, Limbeck, Pilfers, and the Gadjits. Around this time, the band released a split EP with Limbeck, through Utility Records. After returning home, they began writing material for their next album. Following this, the band were scheduled to go on a tour of the UK, which was ultimately canceled. Later in the year, Home Grown experienced significant lineup changes. Herco was forced to leave the group in order to undergo surgery and rehabilitation for a brain tumor. Poyser also left, leaving the band without a second guitar player. Lohrbach and Tran recruited Darren Reynolds from the band Longfellow as the new drummer, and spent some time searching for a suitable second guitarist. In addition, their label Outpost closed down and the band was without a recording contract. Eventually the band decided to continue as a trio without a second guitarist, and signed to the independent label Drive-Thru Records.

=== Kings of Pop ===
In 2002, the band released Kings of Pop, its third album which gained nationwide recognition. Shortly after its release they added second guitarist Dan Hammond and filmed music videos for the songs "You're Not Alone" and "Kiss Me, Diss Me". They performed on the Drive-Thru stage on the Warped Tour and toured extensively in support of the album. In 2004, they released the EP When it All Comes Down, a more mature effort that abandoned the humorous topics of their previous releases in favor of more emotional subject matter. The album was reissued in 2014 on 12" vinyl through Mutant League Records.

=== Break up ===
In February 2005, Lohrbach left Home Grown and later joined the band New Years Day. The band continued without him for a time, playing live shows with guest bass guitarist Ted Vega. Eventually, however, the members moved on to other projects. Tran started the band Red Panda with Bill Uechi of Save Ferris, Hammond joined Paper Models, and Reynolds started Defender. Herco resurfaced in 2004 playing drums with a shortlived band by the name of Ugly, out of Orange, CA. In 2006, Home Grown's official website closed down and their MySpace profile announced that they were on "indefinite hiatus". The band has not played together or recorded since October 2005. Despite this, a new song, "Nothing Can Stop Us", was posted to their Myspace in March 2006.

=== Reunion ===
On April 12, 2024, Home Grown announced they would be reuniting to play with The Starting Line in Los Angeles in June 2024. As of March 2025 the band is slated to play at Four Chords Festival in September of 2025.

On August 15, 2025, Darren Reynolds announced his departure from Home Grown, citing limited availability due to work and family commitments.

Russell Dixon was confirmed to be bands new drummer who Lohrbach had played with in New Years Day & Radical Radical, after filling in for Reynolds since May 2025.

== Musical style and influences ==
Their music is often characterized as pop-punk, lyrically favoring humor and silly or satirical subjects. The band's latter releases would ignore these topics. The band's riffs draw influence from hardcore punk, drawing comparisons to New Found Glory. Screen Rant said "there's a nerdy energy to their vocal delivery that feels like a Weezer fan's dream."

== Band members ==
Home Grown lineups (only official members listed)
(1994–1999) That's Business Wusappaning?! Act Your Age	John Tran – guitar, lead vocals; Adam Lohrbach – bass guitar, lead vocals; Ian Cone – guitar, backing vocals; Bob Herco – drums
(1999–2000) EP Phone Home Connection	John Tran – guitar, lead vocals; Adam Lohrbach – bass guitar, lead vocals; Justin Poyser – guitar, backing vocals; Bob Herco – drums
(2000–2002) Kings of Pop	John Tran – guitar, lead vocals; Adam Lohrbach – bass guitar, lead vocals; Darren Reynolds – drums
(2002–2005) When it All Comes Down	John Tran – guitar, lead vocals; Adam Lohrbach – bass guitar, lead vocals; Dan Hammond – guitar, backing vocals; Darren Reynolds – drums
(2005) live shows only	John Tran – guitar, lead vocals; Dan Hammond – guitar, backing vocals; Ted Vega – bass; Darren Reynolds – drums
(2024-2025) live shows	John Tran - guitar, lead vocals; Adam Lohrbach – bass guitar, lead vocals; Dan Hammond – guitar, backing vocals; Darren Reynolds – drums
(2025-present) live shows	John Tran - guitar, lead vocals; Adam Lohrbach – bass guitar, lead vocals; Dan Hammond – guitar, backing vocals; Russell Dixon – drums

Current members

- John Tran (aka John E. Trash) – guitar, lead vocals (1994–2005) (2024-Present)
- Adam "Adumb" Lohrbach – bass guitar, lead vocals (1994–2005) (2024-Present)
- Dan Hammond – guitar (2002–2005) (2024-Present)
- Russell Dixon - drums (2025–Present)

Former members

- Ian "Slur" Cone – guitar, backing vocals (1994–1999)
- Bob Herco – drums (1994–2000)
- Justin Poyser – guitar, backing vocals (1999–2000)
- Ted Vega – Bass (2005)
- Darren Reynolds – drums (2000–2005) (2024-2025)

== Discography ==
=== Albums ===
Year	Title	Label	Format	Other information
1995	That's Business	Liberation Records	CD/LP	First album.
1998	Act Your Age	Outpost Recordings	CD	Last album with guitarist Ian Cone and drummer Bob Herco.
2002	Kings of Pop	Drive-Thru Records	CD/LP	Final album. First with drummer Darren Reynolds. Only release as a trio.

=== EPs & 7" vinyl ===
Year	Title	Label	Format	Other information
1994	Smoking is Cool	Insta-Noise Records	7" vinyl	First release. Out of print.
1996	Wusappaning?!	Burning Heart/Grilled Cheese	EP	Grilled Cheese exclusive of the North American release of Burning Heart"s European EP.
1999	EP Phone Home	Outpost Recordings	EP	First release with guitarist Justin Poyser.
2000	Connection	Utility Records	EP	Split with Limbeck. Last release with guitarist Justin Poyser and drummer Bob Herco.
2004	When it All Comes Down	Drive-Thru Records	EP	Final release. Only release with guitarist Dan Hammond.

=== Non-album tracks ===
Year	Album/Source	Label	Song(s)	Other information
1996	Punk Bites	Fearless Records	"Will You Dance With Me"	
1997	Take Warning: The Songs of Operation Ivy	Glue Factory Records	"Bombshell"	Originally performed by Operation Ivy.
1997	The Duran Duran Tribute Album	Mojo Records	"Planet Earth"	Originally performed by Duran Duran.
2000	Sleighed: The Other Side of Christmas	Hip-O Records	"Christmas Crush"	
2001	Welcome to the Family	Drive-Thru Records	"Give it Up" (demo), "You're Not Alone" (demo)	Demo versions for Kings of Pop.
2001	Living Tomorrow Today: A Benefit for Ty Cambra	Asian Man Records	"I Love You, Not" (demo)	Demo version for Kings of Pop.
2002	Limited tour single	Drive-Thru Records	"I Want More" (demo)	Outtake from Kings of Pop sessions. Pre-release teaser, also includes 2 album tracks.
2002	"You're Not Alone" UK CD and 7" vinyl singles	Eat Sleep Records	"Break Me Down", "Hope Sinks"	
2004	Happy Holidays from Drive-Thru Records	Drive-Thru Records	"Feliz Navidad"	

== Videography ==
=== Music videos ===
Year	Title	Album	Other information
1998	"Surfer Girl"	Act Your Age	
2002	"You're Not Alone"	Kings of Pop	
2003	"Kiss Me, Diss Me"	Kings of Pop	
2003	"I Love You, Not"	Kings of Pop	
2004	"Feliz Navidad"	Happy Holidays from Drive-Thru Records	

== Chart positions ==
Year	Album	Billboard 200
2002	Kings of Pop	189
