= Hidden in Plain View =

American emo and screamo band

- Origin: Morristown, New Jersey, U.S.
- Genres: Emo, post-hardcore, screamo, emocore, pop punk
- Years active: 2000–2007, 2014–present
- Labels: Drive-Thru, Note to Self, DAB, Rise
- Members: Mike Saffert; Spencer Peterson; Joe Reo; Chris Amato; Rob Freeman
- Past members: Derek Reilly; Kenny Ryan; Jay Snyder

Hidden in Plain View is an American emo and post-hardcore band from northern New Jersey. They formed in 2000 and originally disbanded in 2007. During this seven-year period, the band released records across four different labels (notably the independent label Drive-Thru Records)—including two full-length albums and three EPs. Hidden in Plain View played numerous venues, including The Capitol in Shamokin, Pennsylvania, and concert tours such as the Warped Tour and the Drive-Thru Records Invasion Tours in the United States, Europe and Japan. In 2015 they reunited and released an EP entitled Animal via Rise Records. In 2022, the band released their latest EP Tantrums.

== History ==
Hailing from towns around Hopatcong, New Jersey, Hidden in Plain View formed in August 2000, when former 8 Over Par members Joe Reo (vocals) and Rob Freeman (guitar/backing vocals) merged with former Jersey Nonsense members Kenny Ryan (guitar) and Chris Amato (bass), as well as Derek Reilly (drums). The name "Hidden in Plain View" refers to a situation at singer Reo's day job in a supermarket, where a customer used the expression after needing help finding a blatantly visible item. With this original line-up, the band recorded a three-track demo and soon got in touch with the local record label DAB Records, who released their Chris Badami produced debut Find in March 2001.

With the label facing bankruptcy, and the band substituting Jay Snyder for Reilly (who went on to form Red Light Green Light), Hidden in Plain View were picked up by Note to Self Records in early 2002. For their second EP titled Operation: Cut-Throat, the band exchanged their heavy distortion guitars and genre-typical fast-paced drums for a lighter, more uplifting sound, yet they still maintained a degree of melancholy, especially in the lyrics and vocal melodies. The CD was released on June 11, 2002. Before the end of the year, Ryan left to co-form Rushmore Records (now Drive-Thru Records) signing Houston Calls, while he was replaced by Mike Saffert.

Even though a full-length had been announced by Note to Self, who had since been licensed by LLR Recordings, Hidden in Plain View signed with southern California pop-punk label Drive-Thru Records in June 2003. Simultaneously with the announcement of their signing, LLR re-printed Operation: Cut-Throat. The band went on and recorded four songs for their self-titled Drive-Thru debut. After the recording of the EP, Snyder left the band to start John Connor (Negative Progression Records). Hidden in Plain View was released in November 2003, featuring the liner notes picturing his replacement, Newnan, Georgia resident Spencer Peterson, born in Oil City, Pennsylvania. Peterson was a student at the Atlanta Institute of Music when he joined the band at the age of 19.

In 2004, the band appeared on the Counting Crows tribute album Dead and Dreaming: An Indie Tribute to Counting Crows and the Drive-Thru Christmas compilation Happy Holidays from Drive-Thru Records, and toured extensively in both the United States and the United Kingdom. They also recorded their first full-length album, Life in Dreaming, which dropped in early 2005, showcasing a much more mature, yet edgier and at times darker sound than the band's previous EPs, thanks to the latest two additions to their line-up, Saffert, and Peterson. A demo version of their song "Bleed for You" was contributed to the compilation album Take Action! Volume 04 .

The majority of 2005 was spent touring domestically and internationally, as the band played 24 dates of the Warped Tour, visited Japan for the first time, and co-headlined the European Drive-Thru Invasion Tour 2005, which hit sixteen cities in seven countries across Europe. On October 16, 2005, Hidden in Plain View participated in MTV2's Dew Circuit Breakout (a television battle of the bands), competing in the New York City finals against Pete Miser.

In January 2007, the band announced that they have broken up, citing creative differences. The follow-up record previously recorded, titled Resolution, was released on Drive-Thru Records on July 24, 2007. The CD leaked onto file-sharing networks on July 15, 2007.

On April 16, 2013, Hidden in Plain View announced via their Twitter that they were reuniting for one show, at the Theater of the Living Arts in Philadelphia, US. The show took place on September 7, 2013.

In 2015, the band announced they were embarking on a tour in celebration of the 10th anniversary of their debut album. They also announced that they would be releasing their EP on Rise Records, called Animal.

In 2022, the band released a five song EP titled Tantrums.

== Members ==
- Joe Reo – vocals
- Rob Freeman – guitar, vocals
- Mike Saffert – guitar
- Chris Amato – bass
- Nick Pultz – drums

=== Former members ===
- Derek Reilly – drums
- Kenny Ryan – guitar
- Jay Snyder – drums
- Spencer Peterson – drums

== Discography ==
=== Albums ===
- Life in Dreaming (2005)
- Resolution (2007)

=== EPs ===
- Find (2001)
- Operation: Cut-Throat (2002)
- Hidden in Plain View (2003)
- Animal (2015)
- Tantrums (2022)

=== Non-album tracks ===
- "Mr. Jones" – released on Dead and Dreaming: An Indie Tribute to Counting Crows (2004)
- "Hot 'n' Sexy" – released on the B-side of the 7" vinyl single "Ashes Ashes" (2004)
- "Christmas Song" – released on Happy Holidays from Drive-Thru Records (2004)
- "Bleed For You" – released on Punk the Clock Vol. 1 (2004)
- "Bleed For You (demo)" – released on Take Action! Volume 04 (2004)
- "I Ran" – released on Punk Goes 80's (2005)
- "Ferriswheel" – released on the three-track demo
- "Kicking Stones" – released on the three-track demo
- "To Your Grave" – released on the three-track demo
