= God Lives Underwater discography =

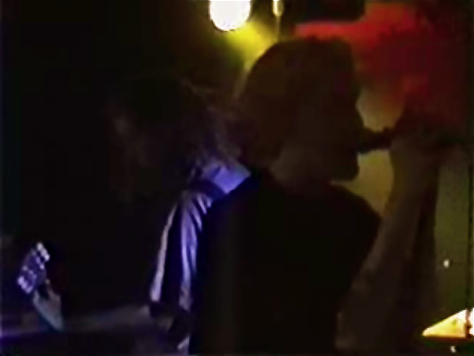
- God Lives Underwater performing at the Dress Rehearsal for Reproduction.
- Studio albums: 3
- Extended plays: 2
- Singles: 7

The discography of God Lives Underwater, a Pennsylvanian band, consists of three studio albums, one extended play, and seven singles.

== Studio albums ==
Year	Album details	Chart peaks	
Year	Album details	U.S.	U.S. Heat
1995	Empty: Released: October 1995; Label: American/Onion Records; Format: CD, CS	-	-
1998	Life in the So-Called Space Age: Released: March 24, 1998; Label: A&M/1500 Records; Format: CD, CS	137	6
2004	Up Off the Floor: Released: September 28, 2004; Label: Megaforce Records/Locomotive Records; Format: CD	-	-

== Extended plays ==
Year	Album details
1994	God Lives Underwater: Released (independent): 1994; Released (American): January 24, 1995; Label: Independent/American Recordings/Onion Records; Format: CD

== Singles ==
Year	Title	Peak chart positions	Album
Year	Title	US Alt	Album
1994	"No More Love"	-	God Lives Underwater
1995	"All Wrong"	-	Empty
1996	"Don't Know How to Be"	-	Empty
1998	"Rearrange"	-	Life in the So-Called Space Age
1998	"From Your Mouth"	17	Life in the So-Called Space Age
2001	"Fame"	-	15 Minutes Soundtrack
2004	"Tricked (That's the Way I Like It)"	-	Up Off the Floor
