= Break out the Battle Tapes =

Break Out The Battle Tapes

Studio album by Wired All Wrong
- Released: September 12, 2006
- Genres: Glam metal; nu metal; industrial techno; rock; electronic rock
- Label: Nitrus Records
- Producers: Jeff Turzo; Matt Mahaffey

Self chronology
Porno, Mint & Grime (2005)	Break out the Battle Tapes (2006)	Super Fake Nice (2014)

God Lives Underwater chronology
Up off the Floor (2004)	Break out the Battle Tapes (2006)

Singles from Break Out The Battle Tapes
- 1. "Nothing at All" Released: June 1, 2006

Break out the Battle Tapes is the only studio album by the American nu metal group Wired All Wrong, a duo formed by Jeff Turzo of God Lives Underwater and Matt Mahaffey of Self. It was released on September 12, 2006, by Nitrus Records. Upon release, the album's high energy and innovative lyricism were consistently praised, but it received mixed reviews for its production and guitar work, drawing comparisons to Mindless Self Indulgence. Several songs from the album were later used for television shows and video games, including The Challenge and Burnout Dominator.

== Background ==
On MTV's program 120 Minutes, American pop rock band Self and American rock band God Lives Underwater had music videos set to air. Their credits had been swapped during the broadcast, leading the bands to be credited for each other's videos and connect afterwards. Jeff Turzo, co-founder of God Lives Underwater, began work on a project entitled Wired All Wrong in December 2002, alongside former bandmate and drummer Scott Garrett. It was planned as his solo debut, slated to feature a multitude of vocal collaborators over Turzo's instrumentation. In 2005, Self went on hiatus after the death of co-founder Mike Mahaffey, brother of lead singer Matt Mahaffey. God Lives Underwater also disbanded after its other co-founder, David Reilly, died. Mahaffey contacted Turzo during production, receiving demo tracks and recording vocals over them. Satisfied with the result, they finalized their collaboration and began working as a duo.

=== Production ===
Turzo worked on the instrumentals for Break out the Battle Tapes, while Mahaffey sang and offered additional production. They used iDisk to share files, never meeting in person during recording. The first song written for the album was "Let Me Go", which would later receive airplay on the radio station WVUD. During production, Turzo censored the album's expletives to avoid exposing his son to harsh language. American rapper Count Bass D's association with Mahaffey led him to feature on the song "You're Freakin' Me Out Girl", contributing vocals. Wired All Wrong planned a tour in support of the album after its completion, additionally producing for other artists including Hellogoodbye's Zombies! Aliens! Vampires! Dinosaurs! (2006).

== Release ==
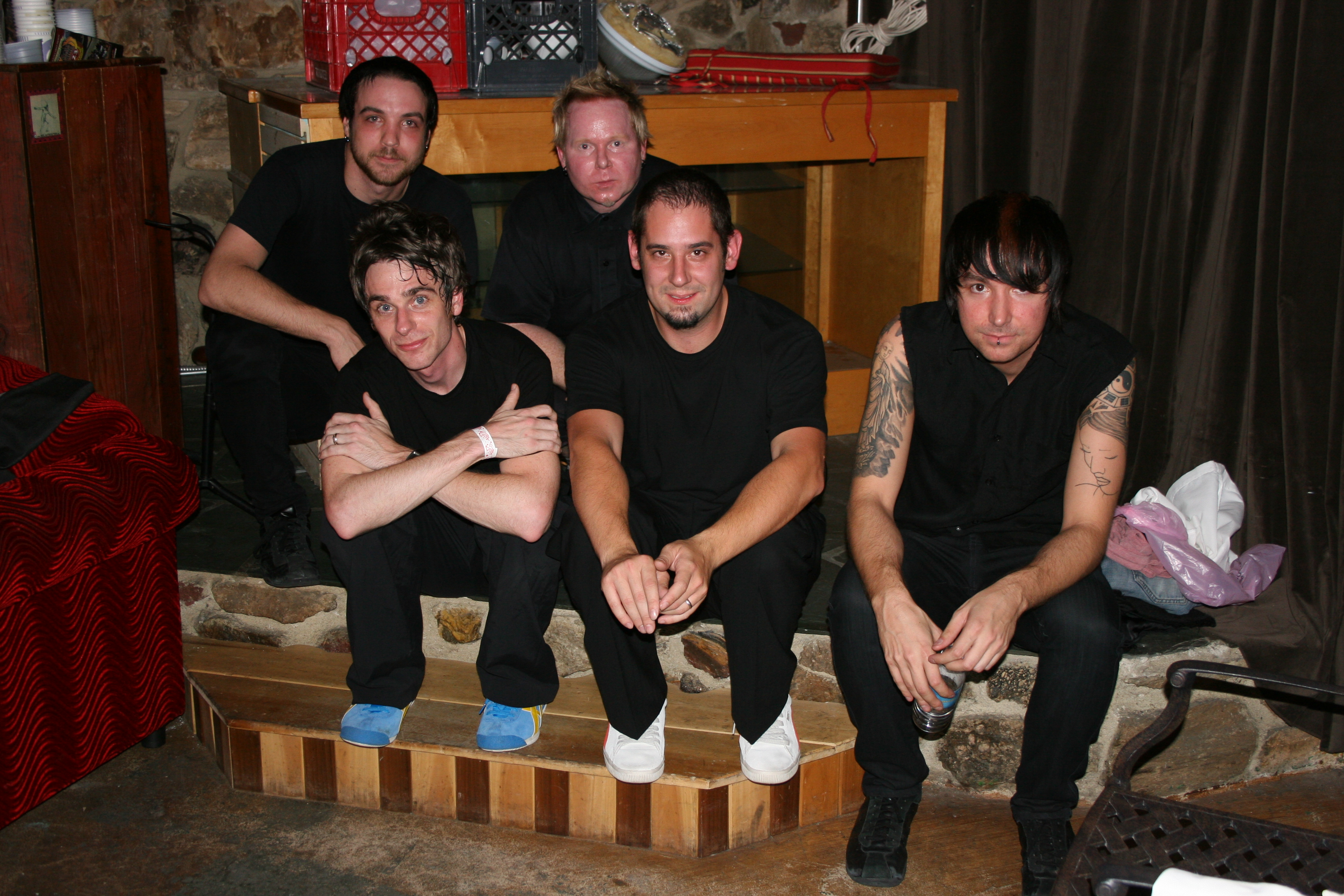
Wired All Wrong in 2006

In March 2006, Wired All Wrong previewed three songs on MySpace in promotion of Break out the Battle Tapes. The album's release date was announced in July, with "Nothing at All" releasing as the lead single and as a music video on August 28 for its remix by Apache. The album released through Nitrus Records on September 12, 2006, appearing on iTunes a week early. On the streaming service, "Nothing At All" was featured as the Single of the Week on November 21, accompanied by a free download. Wired All Wrong performed Break out the Battle Tapes at the 2006 edition of the LA Weekly Detour Music Festival, using a laboratory-inspired stage design and a quartet of female backing vocalists.

The band had a contest for their fans to make the music video for "Nothing at All".

=== Use in media ===
The song "Elevatin'" is featured in an episode of CSI: Miami, while "Lost Angeles" is part of the soundtrack to the racing game Burnout Dominator. An instrumental version of the song is heard in trailers for Burnout Paradise. Additionally, "15 Minutes" was used as the theme song for the 15th season of MTV's reality game show The Challenge.

== Reception ==
Professional ratings
Review scores
Source	Rating
IGN	7.1/10
NeuFutur	7.6/10

James McQuiston of NeuFutur rated the album a 7.6 out of 10, praising its consistent quality and wide range of musical influence. Ed Thompson of IGN followed with a rating of 7.1 out of 10, highlighting the lyricism of "Let Me Go" and likening it to Nine Inch Nails while comparing the track "End of All Things" to Self's rock styling. JJ Koczan of The Aquarian summarized the album as irredeemable, criticizing its compressed guitar work as uninspired and calling it a diluted version of Mindless Self Indulgence. Niki D'Andrea of Phoenix New Times complimented the album's danceability and grittiness, accentuating its "dreamy and doomy keys" and a sound reminiscent of the Prodigy on "15 Minutes". Adam Blyweiss of mxdwn Music commended the project's lyricism being atypical to industrial music, lauding its quick pace and enthusiasm but labeling "Lost Angeles" and "You're Freakin' Me Out Girl" as pretentious.

== Track listing ==
All tracks are written by Jeff Turzo and Matt Mahaffey.

No.	Title	Length
1.	"15 Minutes"	2:54
2.	"Elevatin'"	2:54
3.	"Nothing at All"	3:18
4.	"Medicate"	3:55
5.	"Let Me Go"	3:02
6.	"After All"	3:43
7.	"Lost Angeles"	3:07
8.	"You're Freakin' Me Out Girl" (featuring Count Bass D)	3:16
9.	"Make a Fool"	3:39
10.	"End of All Things"	4:43

== Personnel ==
Musicians

- Jeff Turzo – instruments, production
- Matt Mahaffey – lead vocals, production
- Scott Garrett – drums (4, 10)
- Count Bass D – vocals (8)

Technical

- Tom Baker – mastering engineer
- Sean Beavan – mixing engineer (1, 6–8, 10)
- Dave Way – mixing engineer (2)
- Jeff Turzo – mixing engineer (3–5)
- Matt Mahaffey – mixing engineer (9)
- Greg Yingling – additional production (1, 2, 4, 7, 8)
- Greg Koller – assistant mixing engineer (4)
- Tom Davidson – assistant engineer (8)
- Iishiura – artwork
- Tammy Kennedy – photography
