= Wired All Wrong =

US musical group

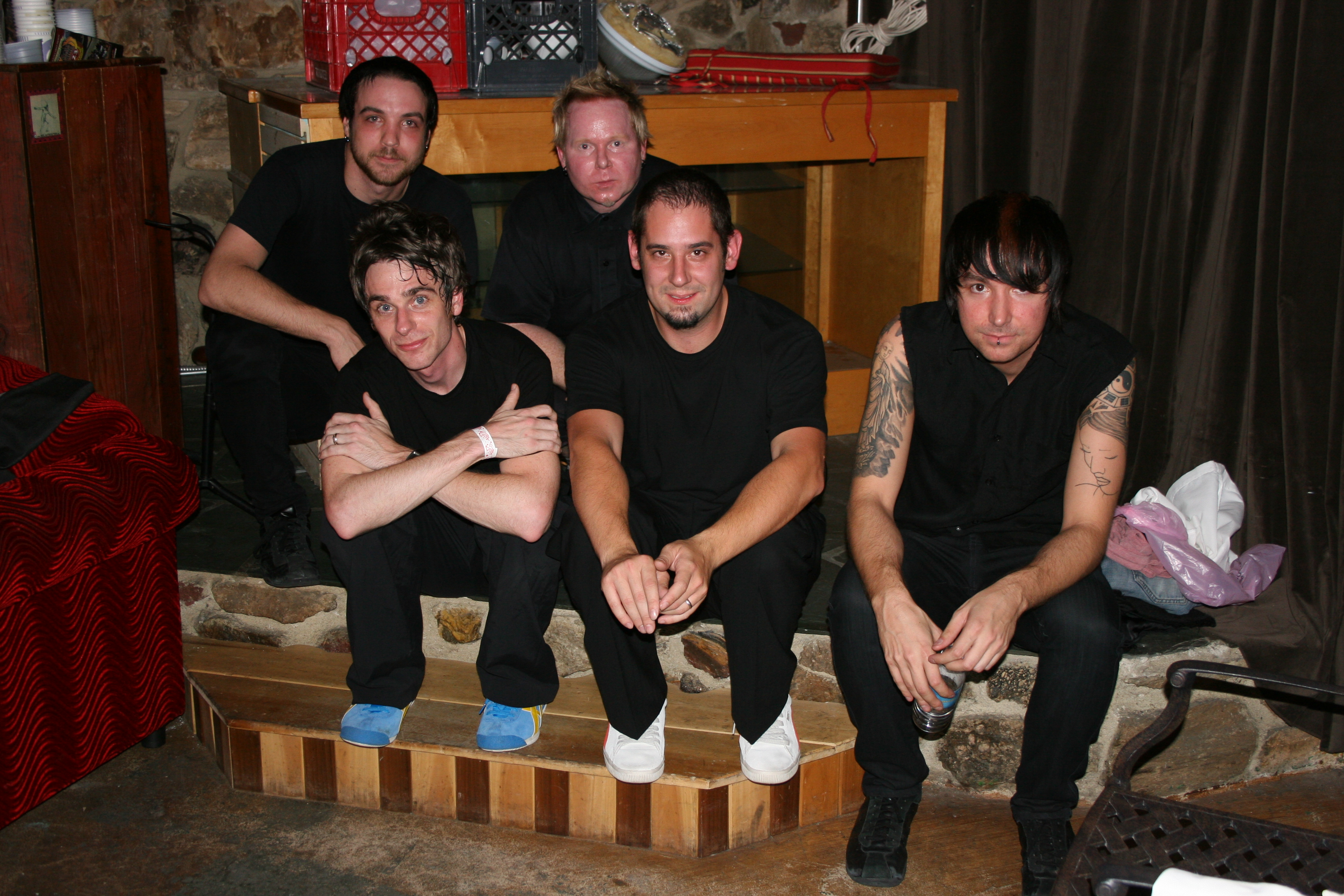

Background information
- Origin: Sherman Oaks, California
- Genres: alternative metal; industrial metal; electronic rock
- Years active: 2004–2009
- Label: Nitrus Records (North America)
- Spinoff of: Self, God Lives Underwater
- Members: Matt Mahaffey; Jeff Turzo; Andy Gerold; Tim Kelleher; Scott Garrett

Wired All Wrong was an electronic rock/alternative metal band formed by musician/producers Matt Mahaffey of Self and Jeff Turzo previously of God Lives Underwater. The two have been longtime friends since a mix-up of their bands on MTV. Partly due to the deaths of David Reilly of God Lives Underwater and Mike Mahaffey of Self, Matt and Jeff were able to shift their attention away from their other bands. Their only studio album, Break out the Battle Tapes, was released on September 12, 2006.

Wired All Wrong performed and recorded a remix of their hit song "Lost Angeles" live at radio station Indie 103. An mp3 of what has been dubbed the "Super Funky Fresh Mix" of the song was available on the band's MySpace page in a blog from September 25, 2006.

The duo produced for the band Hellogoodbye on their debut album Zombies! Aliens! Vampires! Dinosaurs!. They also produced four tracks for the band Forever the Sickest Kids on their debut album Underdog Alma Mater. They produced two tracks on The Sounds' third album Crossing the Rubicon as well as the entire 2008 album Walk This Way by The White Tie Affair.

== Discography ==
=== Studio albums ===
Title	Details
Break out the Battle Tapes'	Released: September 12, 2006; Label: Nitrus Records; Format: CD, Streaming

=== Singles ===
Title	Year	Album
"Nothing at All"	2006	"Break Out The Battle Tapes"
