= Don't Know How to Be =

Single by God Lives Underwater

from the album Empty
- Released: 1996
- Genre: Industrial rock, techno
- Length: 3:33
- Label: American Recordings
- Songwriters: David Reilly and Jeff Turzo
- Producer: Rick Rubin

God Lives Underwater singles chronology
"All Wrong" (1995)	"Don't Know How to Be" (1996)	"Rearrange" (1998)

"Don't Know How to Be" is a song by the band God Lives Underwater. It was originally released on their album Empty in 1995, resulting in significant airplay. The song was eventually remixed for the compilation CD DREgional Volume 1 for WDRE (former Philadelphia radio station).

== Music video ==
Dean Karr directed the music video. It features the band playing live surrounded by bright and bleeding bright lights and colors mixed in with footage of the band hiding and walking through a wooded forest. The music video was featured in the PlayStation game Slamscape.
