= Here (In Your Arms) =

2006 single by Hellogoodbye

Single by Hellogoodbye

from the album Zombies! Aliens! Vampires! Dinosaurs!
- B-side: "Baby, It's Fact" (live)
- Released: August 8, 2006
- Genre: Electropop; power pop; pop; synthpop
- Length: 4:01
- Label: Drive-Thru; Cortex (Australia)
- Songwriter: Forrest Kline
- Producers: Matt Mahaffey; Jeff Turzo

Hellogoodbye singles chronology
"Shimmy Shimmy Quarter Turn" (2005)	"Here (In Your Arms)" (2006)	"All of Your Love" (2007)

Music video
- "Here (In Your Arms)" on YouTube

"Here (In Your Arms)" is the lead single from Hellogoodbye's debut studio album, Zombies! Aliens! Vampires! Dinosaurs! (2006), released on August 8, 2006. The song peaked at number 14 on the US Billboard Hot 100 and was certified platinum in the United States. The song was released in the United Kingdom on April 13, 2007, peaking at number four on the UK Singles Chart. It also entered the top 10 in Ireland, the Netherlands, and Sweden.

== Background and composition ==
Selected as the lead single for their debut studio album, Zombies! Aliens! Vampires! Dinosaurs!, Forrest Kline revealed at first, the band's label Drive-Thru did not see the song as a single. However, they were opened to letting Kline make the decision to releasing the song as one.

The song was written by Forrest Kline, while production was handled by Matt Mahaffey and Jeff Turzo. Musically, critics described the track as electropop, power pop, pop and synthpop. Critics have also compared the sound to the likes of Cher and Daft Punk.

== Critical reception ==
Professional ratings
Review scores
Source	Rating
About.com	4/5 stars
BBC	5/5 stars

Bill Lamb of About.com wrote, "The sound lies somewhere between mainstream power pop and Daft Punk. If there is a downside to 'Here (In Your Arms)', it's that there really is very little of a song here. It's a very simple idea expanded out for almost 4 minutes. However, the sheer joyfulness of the sound and the goofy humor of the band's accompanying video are likely to win you over." Fraser McAlpine of BBC stated, "The lyrics are cutely romantic without getting sickly and the rest is upbeat enough to make it irresistibly danceable without being cheesy or irritating and from the gentle, almost-synthy beginning it builds into a massive ball of sheer, unadulterated glee." Tom Breihan of Village Voice Media said the song "makes good on their synthpop flirtations, turning them into euphoric liquid grace [...] an effortless blast, never showy in its genre-splicing audacity." The Ledger remarked, "It incorporates both the techno chorus and the softer, heartfelt verses."

== Chart performance ==
"Here (In Your Arms)" debuted at number 97 on the Billboard Hot 100. It was released to contemporary hit radio in November 2006, and for the week ending November 26, it received 23 spins and rose to number 62 on the Billboard Hot 100. It peaked at number 14 on the chart.

== Music video ==
The video was released on July 26, 2006, and was directed by Scott Culver. It was shot at Golden Oak Ranch in Los Angeles. The video is set at Camp Holadios, a fictional summer camp. While the band members are all staying there, Forrest becomes interested in a girl who is also at camp. The campers play with pogs. The video is also reminiscent of the film Wet Hot American Summer. One of the references to this movie is when Forrest puts on the headband and sunglasses similar to the change that "Coop" undergoes to win the affection of a girl with the same name, "Katie". Chewing gum is another major reference, where campers in the film are seen chewing gum before they kiss. The camp name "HOLADIOS", written in all capital letters on the sign seen at the beginning and end of the video, can be read as HOLA'ADIOS, which is "Hellogoodbye" in Spanish, but the campers at the end of video are seen wearing t-shirts with the capitalization written as "HolaDios" which is Spanish for HelloGod. Below the camp's name on the sign it states "Summer of 91' ".

== Track listings ==
UK CD1 and European CD single

1. "Here (In Your Arms)" (radio edit) – 3:39
2. "Dear Jamie... Sincerely Me" (live) – 4:21

UK CD2

1. "Here (In Your Arms)" (album version) – 4:01
2. "Dear Jamie... Sincerely Me" (Young Americans remix) – 5:20
3. "Here (In Your Arms)" (club mix) – 3:08

UK 7-inch picture disc

A. "Here (In Your Arms)" (radio edit)
B. "Baby, It's Fact" (live)

Australian CD single

1. "Here (In Your Arms)" (radio edit)
2. "Homewrecker"
3. "Here (In Your Arms)" (live video)

== Personnel ==
Personnel for "Here (In Your Arms)" are adapted from album's liner notes.

Hellogoodbye

- Forrest Kline – vocals, guitar
- Jesse Kurvink – keyboards
- Chris Profeta – drums
- Marcus Cole – bass

Production

- Matt Mahaffey – producer, mixing, engineer
- Jeff Turzo – producer, mixing, engineer
- Forrest Kline – additional production
- Thomas Olson – additional Pro Tools editing
- Chris James – mixing
- Tom Baker – mastering

== Charts ==
=== Weekly charts ===
Weekly chart performance for "Here (In Your Arms)"
Chart (2006–2007)	Peak position
Australia Hitseekers (ARIA)	14
Belgium (Ultratip Bubbling Under Flanders)	7
Belgium (Ultratip Bubbling Under Wallonia)	10
Canada (Canadian Hot 100)	11
Canada CHR/Top 40 (Billboard)	13
Canada Hot AC (Billboard)	11
CIS Airplay (TopHit)	39
Czech Republic Airplay (ČNS IFPI)	16
Europe (Eurochart Hot 100)	15
Germany (GfK)	84
Ireland (IRMA)	2
Netherlands (Dutch Top 40)	10
Netherlands (Single Top 100)	23
Russia Airplay (TopHit)	61
Scottish Singles Sales (Official Charts)	2
Sweden (Sverigetopplistan)	10
Switzerland (Schweizer Hitparade)	55
UK Singles (Official Charts)	4
Ukraine Airplay (TopHit)	39
US Billboard Hot 100	14
US Adult Top 40 (Billboard)	28
US Hot Dance Airplay (Billboard)	3
US Mainstream Top 40 (Billboard)	19

=== Year-end charts ===
Year-end chart performance for "Here (In Your Arms)"
Chart (2007)	Position
CIS Airplay (TopHit)	185
Netherlands (Dutch Top 40)	83
Singapore Airplay (Mediacorp)	42
UK Singles (OCC)	47
US Billboard Hot 100	81
US Hot Dance Airplay (Billboard)	14
US Hot Adult Contemporary (Radio & Records)	100

== Certifications ==
Certifications and sales for "Here (In Your Arms)"
Region	Certification	Certified units/sales
United Kingdom (BPI)	Silver	200,000^{‡}
United States (RIAA)	Platinum	1,000,000^{*}
^{*} Sales figures based on certification alone.^{‡} Sales+streaming figures based on certification alone.

== Release history ==
Release dates and formats for "Here (In Your Arms)"
Region	Date	Format	Label	Ref.
United States	August 8, 2006	Digital download	Drive-Thru	
Australia	October 28, 2006	CD	Cortex	
United Kingdom	April 13, 2007	Digital download	Drive-Thru	
United Kingdom	May 14, 2007	CD	Drive-Thru	
Various	August 20, 2007	Digital download	Drive-Thru	

== Cover versions ==
British radio host Chris Moyles performed a parody of the song called "Beer in Your Arms" on his show on BBC Radio 1 in the United Kingdom.
