= Rearrange =

Rearrange may refer to:

- Rearrange EP, a 1998 promotional EP released by God Lives Underwater, and their second EP album
- "Rearrange" (God Lives Underwater song), 1998
- "Rearrange" (Miles Kane song), 2011
