= LAB Records discography =

- Studio albums: +10
- Extended plays: +10
- Compilation albums: +1
- Singles: +16

The following is the discography of LAB Records, an independent record label in Britain founded in 2007.

Releases are in the pop and rock genres, with bands primarily from the United States and UK. As of 2013 the label has released albums such as The Way I Fell In by The Morning Of, Would It Kill You? by Hellogoodbye, and It Hates You by He Is Legend.

== Discography ==
Cat. #	Artist	Title	Format	Other information
LAB001	Lost On Campus	...Tell Them I Had A Wonderful Life (EP) (2007)	CD, Digital	LAB Records' first release.
LAB002	Edward Lewis	Somebody, Probably A Nobody (Single) (2008)	Digital	First LAB digital only single.
LAB003	Lost On Campus	There's Room On My Shoulders (EP) (2008)	CD, Digital	Re-issue of the debut self-released EP
LAB004	Clarkson	This Is Clarkson (EP) (2008)	Digital	
LAB005	MiMi Soya	The Four Penny Knee Tremble] (EP) (2008)	CD, Digital	
LAB006	My Actions Your Exit	Colours (EP) (2008)	CD, Digital	
LAB007	Various Artists	2009 Preview Sampler (2008)	CD, Digital	
LAB008	Lost On Campus	But A Bridge (Single) (2008)	CD, Digital	
LAB009	The Auteur	Hey! Watch This... (Single) (2009)	CD, Digital	
LAB010	MiMi Soya	The Four Penny Knee Trembler DELUXE (EP) (2009)	CD	Deluxe, re-issue of original release.
LAB011	MiMi Soya	Don't Forget To Breathe! (Single) (2009)	Digital	
LAB012	The Auteur	Nightcap (EP) (2009)	CD, Digipack, Digital	
LAB013	The Honeymoon Suite	Calm Your Little Passions (EP) (2009)	CD, Digital	
LAB014	He Is Legend	It Hates You (2009)	CD	
LAB015	Adelaide	...And They Said (Single) (2009)	CD, Digital	
LAB016	Eat Sleep Attack	"Fallin'" (Single) (2009)	CD, Digital	
LAB017	Various Artists	LAB:Testing (Digital compilation) (2009)	Digital	A digital compilation featuring LAB friends and family
LAB018	Blitz Kids	Decisions (EP) (2009)	CD, Digital	
LAB019	Lost On Landing	Sweet Talk (Single) (2009)	CD, Digital	
LAB020	Pegasus Bridge	Yoko/Paris (Single) (2009)	Digital	Secured LAB Records first prime-time Radio 1 airtime.
LAB021	Portia Conn	"I Don't Care" (Single) (2010)	CD, Digital	
LAB022	MiMi Soya	Should Have Called In Sick (Single) (2010)	CD, Digital	
LAB023	Lost On Campus	In Pursuit Of Courage & Heart (EP) (2010)	CD Digipack, Digital	Artists sophomore release on LAB Records
LAB024	Jeremy Ashida	"Smoke Break" (Single) (2010)	Digital	
LAB025	The Morning Of	The Way I Fell In (Album) (2010)	CD, Dropcards, Digital	LAB Records first USA physical store release. Reached number 10 on the Billboard Heatseeker Chart.
LAB026	Not Advised	"The World's Not Ready" (Single) (2010)	Digital	Secured LAB Records first national TV placement with accompanying music video.
LAB027	Not Advised	After The Fight (EP) (2010)	CD, Digital	
LAB028	MiMi Soya	I Can't Stand Pop Bands (EP) (2010)	CD, Digipack, Digital	
LAB029	Charlee Drew	"Sugar Rush" (Single) (2010)	Digital	
LAB030	Just Surrender	Phoenix (Album) (2010)	CD, Digital	
LAB031	Pegasus Bridge	"Ribena" (Single) (2010)	CD, Digital	
LAB032	Not Advised	"Right Now" (Single) (2010)	Digital	
LAB033	Pegasus Bridge	While We're Young (Album) (2010)	CD, Digital	
LAB034	MiMi Soya	"Millionaire" (Single) (2010)	Digital	
LAB035	Not Advised	"The A.R.K." (Single) (2011)	Digital	
LAB036	Hellogoodbye	Would It Kill You? (Album) (2011)	Digital	
