= Gregg Hale =

Gregg Hale may refer to:

- Gregg Hale (filmmaker), American film producer
- Gregg Hale (musician) (born 1977), best known as the guitarist for the British band Spiritualized
