= OMG HGB DVD ROTFL =

Video by Hellogoodbye
- Released: November 22, 2005
- Length: 120 min.
- Label: Drive-Thru Records

Professional ratings
Review scores
Source	Rating
AbsolutePunk	74% link

OMG HGB DVD ROTFL is a DVD by American rock band Hellogoodbye. It contains two hours of music videos, tour footage, a full 40-minute concert and a 30-minute acoustic set.

== Release ==
It was announced on November 4, 2005, and released on November 22 through Drive-Thru Records.

The title is composed of acronyms used in internet slang, and stands for "Oh my God/Hellogoodbye/Digital versatile disc/Rolling on the floor, laughing". When designing the artwork for the DVD jacket, vocalist/guitarist Forrest Kline initially intended it to be a space filler until they would find a serious title. However, OMG HGB DVD ROTFL stuck.

== Content ==
=== Music videos ===
The DVD's first segment comprises the band's five music videos to all the songs off their Hellogoodbye EP, along with a making of montage. All of the videos show the band in ridiculous costumes and/or comedic alter egos – from a parody of Baywatch in "Shimmy Shimmy Quarter Turn", directed by Darren Doane, via a tennis match in "Call n' Return", directed by Scott Culver, to players, German exchange students and finger puppets in the remaining three videos, which were all directed by Jonathan London and filmed exclusively for the DVD.

=== House of Blues performance ===
Secondly, OMG HGB DVD ROTFL contains a 40-minute concert, filmed in high-definition at the band's stop at the House of Blues in Anaheim, California on July 14, 2005, during their tour with Houston Calls, JamisonParker and The Rocket Summer. Following a short pre-show interview, the band plays an eleven song set, including their entire debut EP.

==== Setlist ====
1. "Call n' Return"
2. "All Time Lows"
3. "Figures A and B"
4. "Dear Jamie... Sincerely Me"
5. "Homewrecker"
6. "Here in Your Arms"
7. "Bonnie Taylor Shakedown... 2K1"
8. "Oh, It Is Love"
9. "Shimmy Shimmy Quarter Turn"
10. "Touchdown Turnaround"
11. "Jesse Buy Nothing... Go to Prom Anyways"

=== Chain Reaction acoustic benefit ===
Following the House of Blues performance is a 30-minute unplugged benefit concert for the Deborah Heart and Lung Center, recorded at Chain Reaction in Anaheim, California on January 7, 2005. Hellogoodbye play calmer interpretations of their songs using banjos, rattles, a glockenspiel and similar acoustic instruments. Kurvink and Profeta's musician fathers joined the band onstage for "Fly Me to the Moon".

==== Setlist ====
1. "Dear Jamie... Sincerely Me"
2. "Homewrecker"
3. "All Time Lows"
4. "If You Wanna, I Might"
5. "The Way I Feel Inside" (The Zombies cover)
6. "Fly Me to the Moon" (Frank Sinatra cover)
7. "Call n' Return"
8. "Shimmy Shimmy Quarter Turn"

=== Tour footage and extras ===
Lastly, the DVD features approximately twenty minutes of road stories and touring antics, shot during their West Coast tour with Houston Calls, JamisonParker and The Rocket Summer. Besides containing another acoustic rendition of "Homewrecker", the segment also gives insight on Hellogoodbye's backstage routines, such as blowing up inflatable pool toys and waging Super Soaker wars on Houston Calls. In addition, the tour is documented by a photo slideshow.
