= Matt B. Britton =

American businessperson

Matt Britton
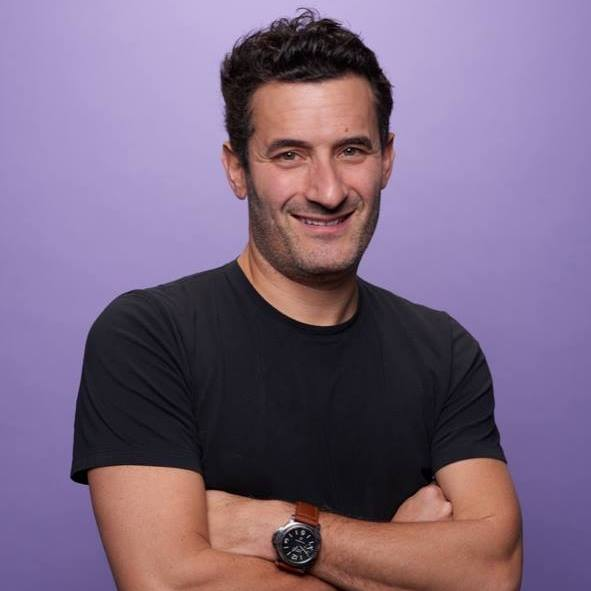
- Matt Britton, Founder and CEO, Suzy
- Born: 1975 (age 50–51)
- Website: http://www.mattbritton.com

Matt B. Britton (born January 24, 1975) is a new media entrepreneur and consumer trend analyst based in New York City.

Britton is as chief executive officer of Suzy, a real-time consumer intelligence software. Previously he was chief executive officer of MRY, a marketing and technology agency with over 500 employees that is part of the Publicis Groupe. MRY, formed in 2013, is the combination of Mr. Youth, (the agency Britton founded in 2002) and the former U.S. operations of LBi. The two agencies merged under Britton's leadership in January 2013 to become MRY. MRY's clients include Visa, Coca-Cola, Bayer, and Neutrogena.

== Career ==
=== The Magma Group ===
In January 1997, Britton (then a college senior at Boston University) founded The Magma Group, a college marketing firm focused on the hi-tech industry. The Magma Group's clients included Yahoo!, Lycos, eBay, and Sony Music. At the time Britton founded the Magma Group, he was involved in a successful entertainment promotions venture with hospitality entrepreneur Jason Strauss. In December 2002, The Magma Group was acquired in part by YouthStream Media Networks, where Britton was retained as the Director of Event Marketing Development.

Britton was named to the Entrepreneur Magazine "30 Under 30" list (the top 30 U.S. entrepreneurs under 30 years of age) in April 2000.

=== Mr. Youth ===
In September 2002, Britton joined Paul Tedeschi to found Mr Youth LLC, a youth marketing agency. In 2005, Britton's company Mr. Youth purchased the then 23-year-old CollegeFest event. In 2005 & 2006, Britton gained industry notoriety when he was a guest expert on the daily show with Jon Stewart regarding youth marketing. In February 2009, Mr Youth closed private equity financing with Alta Communications and The Mustang Group at which point Paul Tedeschi left the company In March 2010, Britton's agency Mr Youth was named one of the top 10 most innovative Advertising/Marketing companies in the world In March 2011, Britton announced the S-List a partnership with former NBA Star Rick Fox to leverage the use of social media by celebrities into branding opportunities. In November 2011, Britton sold Mr Youth to LBi for a reported $40 to $50 Million.

=== CrowdTap ===
In July 2011, Britton executed the spinoff of CrowdTap, a social media marketing software platform. Shortly thereafter CrowdTap completed $7 Million in Series A Funding from the Foundry Group. The company raised another $5Mill in Series B funding in 2014 from Foundry Group and others. Britton was CrowdTap's Chief Advisor from July 2011 to February 2017. In February 2017, Britton became the chief executive officer.

=== YouthNation ===
In April 2015, Britton published his first book entitled "YouthNation" with Wiley Publishing. The book explores the impact millennials have on the future of business and brand building. The book peaked at #8 on the Los Angeles Times bestsellers list.

=== Suzy ===
In March 2018, Britton executed the spinoff of Suzy, a real-time consumer intelligence software platform. Suzy completed a $5 Million Series B funding in late 2017 from the Durant Company and Foundry Group. Suzy's clients include Netflix, Coca-Cola, Procter & Gamble and Nintendo. Britton was named to the Digital 40 under 40 (the top 40 U.S. digital executives under 40 years of age.)
