= God Lives Underwater (EP) =

- Art Direction and Design: Christine Cano

EP by God Lives Underwater
- Released: 1994 (independent release); January 24, 1995 (American Recordings release)
- Recorded: 1993
- Studio: Home
- Genre: Industrial rock, electronica, techno
- Length: 24:49
- Label: American
- Producer: God Lives Underwater, Gary Richards

God Lives Underwater chronology
God Lives Underwater (1994)	Empty (1995)

Professional ratings
Review scores
Source	Rating
AllMusic	2.5/5 stars
Collector's Guide to Heavy Metal	5/10

God Lives Underwater is the debut EP and first major release by God Lives Underwater. It was recorded in 1993, and self-distributed by the band in 1994, followed by a national release in 1995. "No More Love", the EP's lead single, was also released on the band's second album Empty. The song "Drag Me Down" was featured in the movie The Doom Generation and "No More Love" was also featured in the movie Johnny Mnemonic.

== Musical and lyrical themes ==
The musical style of God Lives Underwater is a constantly contested issue and the genres that the band are categorized in vary depending on the source, however, the band is generally regarded as industrial rock, while showing influences of many different genres. The influence of electronica can be seen throughout the songs "No More Love" and "Try". Most songs include a portion of techno, including the beginning of "No More Love". All songs are mainly classified as industrial rock, because the genre dominates in comparison to the rest of the genres.

The "No More Love" music video depicts the natural side of God Lives Underwater.

David Reilly and Jeff Turzo had conceived the EP in late 1993, and as such, the band's later members (guitarist Andrew McGee and drummer Adam Kary) were not involved in the recording process.

== Reception ==
The God Lives Underwater EP was not as popular when it comes to ratings as other albums, but when it was rated, the reception was generally fair-to-well. AllMusic stated that "...the heavily compressed production on opening song 'Drag Me Down' lacks the more full-bodied beat and bass punch of the remainder of the EP. 'No More Love' sets things to rights, while 'Lonely Again' is the best song on the disc, with an echoed, beautifully epic guitar intro and a moody melancholy captured in both the singing and the slow music." Allmusic gave it 2.5 out of 5 stars.

"No More Love" was a released as a single, and was later included on the band's 1995 full-length album Empty. Two music videos were shot for the song. The first (1994) featured the band playing outside, opening with cooling towers from a nuclear power plant. This video later appeared in the 1996 PlayStation game Slamscape. A second video (1995) was shot in conjunction with the song's use in the 1995 film Johnny Mnemonic, which was based on a short story by William Gibson.

== Track listing ==
All songs performed by God Lives Underwater, all tracks written by David Reilly and Jeff Turzo.

God Lives Underwater
No.	Title	Length
1.	"Drag Me Down"	3:19
2.	"No More Love"	4:16
3.	"Lonely Again"	5:00
4.	"Nothing"	4:18
5.	"Try"	3:40
6.	"Waste of Time"	4:14

== Personnel ==
God Lives Underwater

- David Reilly - lead vocals, keyboards, programming
- Jeff Turzo - guitars, keyboards, bass, programming
- Andrew McGee - guitars
- Adam Kary - drums

Production

- Gary Richards - production
- Rick Rubin - executive producer
- Christine Cano - art direction and design
- Clark Eddy - mixing
- Marc Geiger - engineering
- Afshin Ammadi - mastering
- Ralph Eugene Meatyard - front and back cover photos
