= Golden Oak Ranch =

Movie ranch in Los Angeles County, California

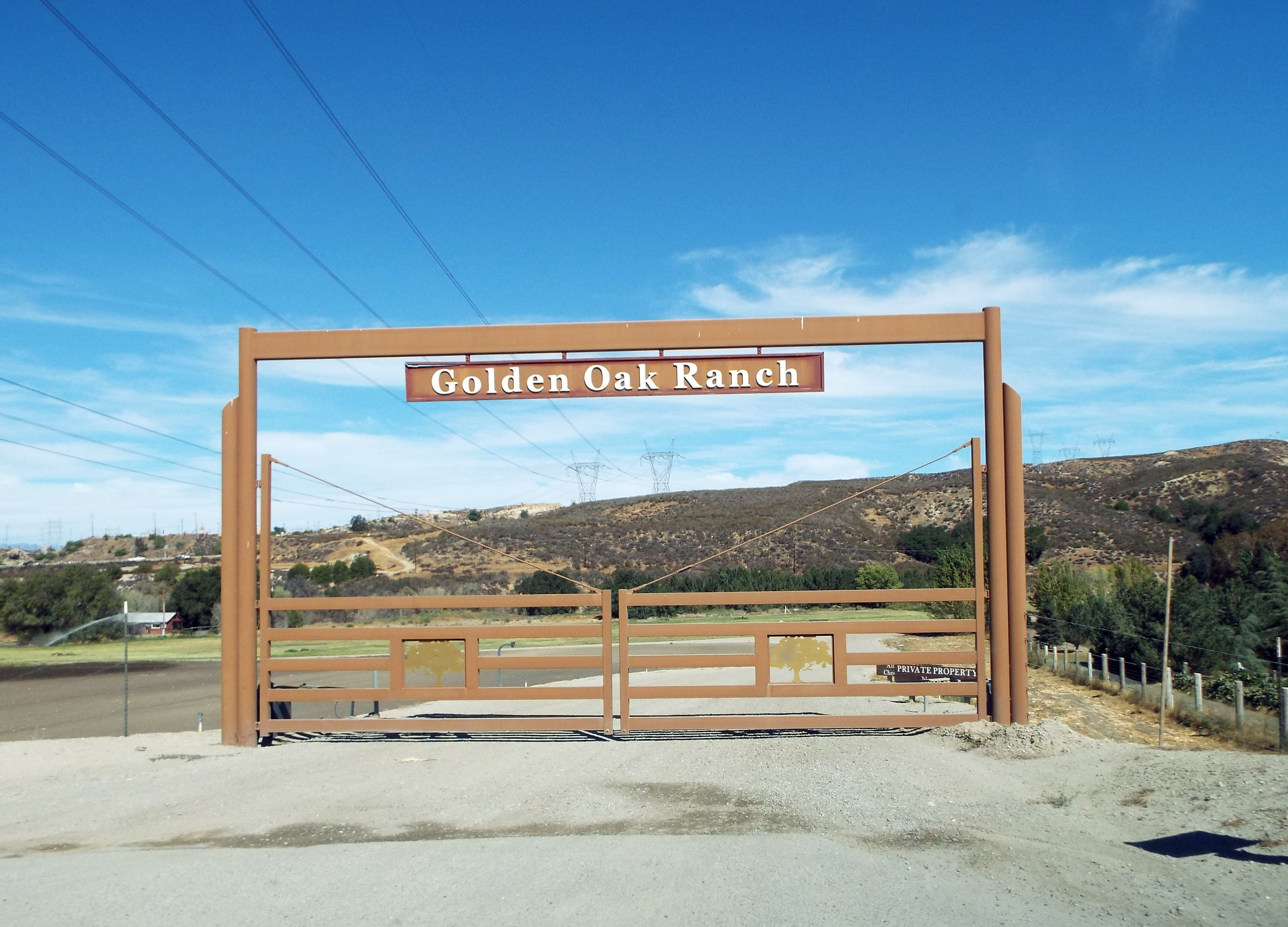
- Golden Oak Ranch entrance gate

Project
- Status: Operating
- Website: goldenoakranch.com

Location
- Location within Santa Clarita
- Address: 19802 Placerita Canyon Road, Newhall, California 91321, United States

Area
  - Total: 360 ha (890 acres)

Golden Oak Ranch is an 890-acre (360-hectare) movie ranch owned by the Walt Disney Studios subsidiary of The Walt Disney Company that serves as a filming location and backlot. The ranch is off of Placerita Canyon Road outside of Newhall, California, United States less than an hour north of Los Angeles; its entrance is not far from Placerita Canyon Road's intersection with California State Route 14.

The ranch is on land that was part of the Rancho San Francisco land grant. Its name honors the first discovery of gold in California at the site by Francisco Lopez, years before the discovery that precipitated the California Gold Rush. The ranch has a heliport, grassy meadows, two creeks, a waterfall, and various Western sets.

== History ==
Walt Disney Productions first leased the land for the Mickey Mouse Club "Adventures of Spin & Marty" segments in the 1950s. The company bought the 315-acre (127 ha) ranch in 1959 for $300,000 (~$2.46 million in 2024). Subsequent purchases of adjacent land increased the area of the ranch to 890 acres (360 ha).

A business district set and residential street set were built on the ranch by 2012. The district set has 42 stores, while the residential set has 23 houses all with separate architectural style.

In May 2013, Disney announced plans to redevelop 58 acres (23 ha) of the property into a new film and television production studio, consisting of six new sound stages and production offices. The site will be called Disney | ABC Studios at The Ranch.

The project was approved by Los Angeles County in August 2013.

In October 2017, a second extension for the new studio's construction permit was granted, extending the permit to January 2019.

== Productions ==
The ranch was used to film the episodes of Spin and Marty, a popular segment of The Mickey Mouse Club and parts of Zorro. The first movie shot at the ranch was Toby Tyler. Most of the exterior scenes in Old Yeller were filmed here. The Bolton Estate scenes and several others from Disney's The Horse in the Gray Flannel Suit was shot here. The town featured in Roots: The Next Generations was also built on the Golden Oak Ranch. Other films and television shows that were shot on this location include:

- The Apple Dumpling Gang
- Mame
- The Muppets
- Pirates of the Caribbean: At World's End
- Pete's Dragon
- Behind the Candelabra
- Treasure of Matecumbe
- The Cat from Outer Space
- The Muppet Movie
- The A-Team
- The Electric Horseman
- Little House on the Prairie
- Buffy the Vampire Slayer
- Fire Down Below (1997 film)
- Joe Dirt
- Parks and Recreation
- The Majestic
- Desperate Housewives (season 8, episode 6)
- Role Models
- Holes
- Camp Nowhere
- The Country Bears
- Westworld (TV show)
- The Dukes of Hazzard
- The Office
- Ten Days in the Valley

The ranch has also been used for filming Colonel Sanders commercials for Kentucky Fried Chicken, and the music video for Jordin Sparks' song, Battlefield. A covered bridge spans the man-made stream featured in Follow Me, Boys!, episodes of Bonanza, The Greatest American Hero, various episode of multiple Star Trek series and was used for parts of the music video of Amaranth by Nightwish. The exterior house featured in the original 1961 film The Parent Trap was also shot on the ranch, as was the Peabody farm from the Universal film Back to the Future. It was also used for the filming of three of the five Herbie films, including two scenes at the lake in The Love Bug and Herbie Goes to Monte Carlo, along with Alonzo Hawk's dream sequence in Herbie Rides Again. In 1985, Big Top Pee-wee was filmed here and part of Short Circuit was filmed here as well. According to Phil Abraham, parts of "The Hobo Code" (a first-season episode of Mad Men) were filmed here (specifically, the scenes of Don Draper's childhood). The rural farmhouse set on the ranch (known as "Olivia's House") played the part of Margaret Sterling's hippie commune in the fourth episode of Season 7 of Mad Men. It is also the setting of Dwight Schrute's farm on several episodes of The Office, and has also been used for the exterior downtown scenes of WandaVision. The official video of Ed Sheeran's song Overpass Graffiti was filmed there. The music video for HelloGoodbye's song "Here (In Your Arms)" was also filmed there.

== Bibliography ==
- Cotter, Bill (2002) [1997]. "Disney's Golden Oak Ranch" (blog of former Disney employee and author of "The Wonderful World of Disney Television").
