= Hellogoodbye (EP) =

EP by Hellogoodbye
- Released: August 17, 2004
- Recorded: Forrest Kline's house (Huntington Beach, California)
- Genre: Emo-pop
- Length: 22:04
- Label: Drive-Thru
- Producer: Forrest Kline

Hellogoodbye chronology
Hellogoodbye (2004)	Zombies! Aliens! Vampires! Dinosaurs! (2006)

Professional ratings
Review scores
Source	Rating
Allmusic	3.5/5 stars

Hellogoodbye is the debut EP from Hellogoodbye. It was released on August 17, 2004, by Drive-Thru Records. All the vocals and instruments were recorded solely by Forrest Kline, except for the lead vocals on track 4, which were performed by Jesse Kurvink.

== Album artwork ==
The cover is a spoof on Andy Warhol's album cover for The Velvet Underground & Nico (1967) by The Velvet Underground. Instead of featuring a banana with the words "peel slowly and see", it instead depicts an avocado with the accompanying phrase "mush slowly and guac."

== Release ==
On March 18, 2004, shortly after the band were signed to Drive-Thru, the first five tracks of the EP were released digitally, as the second of two free downloadable EPs (the first one being Jenoah's Morning Is When Jenoah Wakes Up) on the label's homepage. The Hellogoodbye EP was downloaded about 300,000 times, while the physical release issued 5 months later has sold over 80,000 copies to date. With the physical release, which featured the sixth track, the download offer was discontinued.

== Track listing ==
1. "Shimmy Shimmy Quarter Turn (Take It Back To Square One)" (Forrest Kline, Jesse Kurvink) – 3:13
2. "Call N' Return (Say That You're Into Me)" (Kline) – 2:17
3. "Bonnie Taylor Shakedown 2K1" (Kurvink) – 2:33
4. "Jesse Buy Nothing... Go to Prom Anyways" (Kurvink) – 2:50
5. "Dear Jamie... Sincerely Me" (Kline) – 8:34
6. "Bonnie Taylor Shakedown 2K4" (Kurvink) – 2:32

Re-issue Bonus Tracks

7. "Shimmy Shimmy Quarter Turn (Take It Back To Square One)" (Demo) – 3:01
8. "Shimmy Shimmy Quarter Turn (Take It Back To Square One)" (Gm Og Mix) – 3:03
9. "Call N' Return (Say That You're Into Me)" (Demo) – 2:18
10. "Bonnie Taylor Shakedown... 2K1" (Demo) – 2:35
11. "Bonnie Taylor Shakedown... 2K1" (Gm Og Mix) – 2:37
12. "Asking Jessica To Be Official" – 1:16
13. "Jesse Buy Corsage" (Prequel To Jesse Buy Nothing) – 2:21
14. "In Da Club" (Promo For Chain Show) – 0:46
15. "Welcome To My Record" (Gm Og Mix) – 1:59
16. "One Armed Scissor" (Voicemail By: Turtle) – 0:54
17. "Trevor Roolz (A Lot)" (Gm Og Mix) – 0:32
18. "Lindsay Pai Ala Mode" (Or Songs For Lindsay Pai) – 4:19
19. "Oh Karissa, How I Miss Ya" (Gm Og Mix) – 0:40
20. "Oh, Angie" (Demo) – 1:13
21. "Oh, Angie" (Gm Og Mix) – 0:54

== Charts ==
Chart performance for Hellogoodbye
Chart (2006)	Peak position
US Heatseekers Albums (Billboard)	31
