= Up off the Floor =

Up Off The Floor

Studio album by God Lives Underwater
- Released: September 28, 2004
- Recorded: 2000
- Genre: Industrial rock, techno
- Length: 41:23
- Label: Megaforce/Locomotive Records
- Producer: Sean Beavan

God Lives Underwater chronology
Rearrange EP (1998)	Up Off The Floor (2004)	Break out the Battle Tapes (2006)

Up Off the Floor (stylized as upoffthefloor) is the third and final studio album by God Lives Underwater. The album was originally recorded in 2000 but due to various problems, the album was shelved until Locomotive Records (owned by Megaforce Records) picked it up. There were numerous problems with Locomotive's pressing. The sound quality suffered due to either an error in production or the oversight of not using the master recordings, various grammatical errors remained within the liner notes, and two of the more well-known songs from the album's sessions ("Choir Boy" and a cover of David Bowie's "Fame") were removed and not included in the official release for undisclosed reasons. A promotional version of Up Off the Floor also circulated online which possessed better sound quality overall.

== Track listing ==
All songs written by David Reilly and Jeff Turzo, except where noted.

1. "White Noise" (Scott Garret, Andrew McGee, Reilly, Turzo) – 3:16
2. "Tricked (That's the Way I Like It)" – 3:51
3. "1% (The Long Way Down)" – 4:13
4. "Whatever You've Got" – 4:27
5. "No Way (You Must Understand)" – 4:21
6. "Slip to Fall" – 4:16
7. "History" – 3:06
8. "72 Hour Hold" (McGee, Reilly, Turzo) – 3:46
9. "Miss You More Than Anything" – 4:21
10. "Positivity" – 4:45

== Personnel ==
God Lives Underwater

- David Reilly - lead vocals, keyboards, programming
- Jeff Turzo - guitars, bass, keyboards, programming
- Andrew McGee - guitars
- Scott Garret - drums
