= Zombies! Aliens! Vampires! Dinosaurs! =

Studio album by Hellogoodbye
- Released: August 8, 2006
- Studio: Cracker Tracks
- Genres: Emo pop; pop punk; pop
- Length: 35:02
- Label: Drive-Thru
- Producers: Matt Mahaffey; Jeff Turzo

Hellogoodbye chronology
| Hellogoodbye (2004) | Zombies! Aliens! Vampires! Dinosaurs! (2006) | Would It Kill You? (2010) |

Singles from Zombies! Aliens! Vampires! Dinosaurs!
- 1. "Here (In Your Arms)" Released: May 14, 2006; 2. "All of Your Love" Released: March 2007; 3. "Baby, It's Fact" Released: September 20, 2007

Zombies! Aliens! Vampires! Dinosaurs! is the debut studio album by American indie pop band Hellogoodbye. Produced by Matt Mahaffey, Jeff Turzo, and Forrest Kline, the album was released on August 8, 2006 in the United States by Drive-Thru Records. The album's lead single, "Here (In Your Arms)", reached number 14 on the Billboard Hot 100 and was certified platinum in the United States.

The album's title is a reference to popular geek culture and interests during the mid-2000s. The cover artwork was done by LeDouxville. The Japanese release additionally features live versions of "Here (In Your Arms)" and "Homewrecker".

== Background ==
Hellogoodbye was formed in 2002 by vocalist/guitarist Forrest Kline, bassist Marcus Cole, keyboardist Jesse Kurvink, and drummer Chris Profeta.

Drive-Thru, which formerly employed Kline as a web design intern at 16, signed the band in 2004. The label's deal with majors MCA (and its successor, Geffen) was nearing its conclusion and the label intended to keep their newest artist signing quiet. Drive-Thru feared the majors might realize Hellogoodbye's potential and attempt to steal them away. The band issued an eponymous online EP for free, and although it was intended to remain "under the radar," it attracted commercial attention. "Shimmy Shimmy Quarter Turn" became a minor hit on MTV and helped the group gain notoriety. The group was chosen by the cast of MTV's The Real World: Austin to be followed during South by Southwest (SXSW), and their profile began to increase dramatically. This exposure was aided by Drive-Thru's distribution deal with Sony BMG’s RED Distribution, through Sanctuary Records. Drive-Thru paid $20,000 to promote the EP, which Sanctuary funded retail pricing and positioning.

== Recording ==
The album was recorded at Cracker Tracks in Los Angeles, a home studio that was owned by Matt Mahaffey of the band Self. Kline found his first professional recording not dissimilar from the way he had previously made music, via a computer in his bedroom. Mahaffey and Jeff Turzo produced and engineered the sessions, with additional production from Kline, and additional Pro Tools editing from Thomas Olson. Mahaffey, Turzo, and Chris James mixed the recordings, before they were mastered by Tom Baker at Precision Mastering. Recording of the album finished in March 2006.

== Release ==
The group went on an east/Midwest tour of the US from late November to mid-December 2005 with The Rocket Summer, Hit the Lights, and Dave Melillo. During this tour the group performed new songs. In February and March 2006, they supported the Academy Is... on their headlining tour. The band supported Motion City Soundtrack on the mtvU Campus Invasion tour in April 2006. Following this, they appeared at The Bamboozle festival, and went on the Warped Tour. On June 26, Zombies! Aliens! Vampires! Dinosaurs! was announced for release, and the track listing was revealed. The album was initially planned for release in May, before being eventually released in August. It was made available for streaming a few days prior to release on their Myspace profile. The music video for "Here (In Your Arms)" was directed by Fred Savage. By the end of the summer of 2006, the group were regularly selling out 1,000+ venues. Following this, they appeared at the Bamboozle Left festival. In October and November, the band went on a headlining tour with support from Ozma, Cute Is What We Aim For, Peachcake, Reggie and the Full Effect, and Melillo.

In January and February 2007, Hellogoodbye played two shows in Japan, before embarking on a tour of the UK. On March 14, 2007, the band released a "All of Your Love" remix EP featuring "The Jimmy Pop Remix", "Forrest's Remix" and "Self's Remix". From early April to early June, the band went on the Two Months Of Spring Break Tour '99 tour of North America. They were supported by Boys Like Girls, the Hush Sound and the Rocket Summer. In the midst of this, they appeared at that year's Bamboozle. In October and November, the group co-headlined the Myspace Music Tour with Say Anything. They were supported by Polysics and Young Love. They ended the year with a tour of the UK in November and December 2007 with Say Anything, Sherwood, and Go:Audio.

== Reception ==
Professional ratings
Review scores
| Source | Rating |
|---|---|
| AbsolutePunk.net | (69%) |
| AllMusic | 3.5/5 stars |
| Punknews.org | 3/5 stars |
| Spin | 5/10 |
| Yahoo! Music | Favorable |

=== Critical reception ===
Spin's Trevor Kelley gave the album 5 out of 10 in his review, remarking, "While the synth-punk anthems on the California quartet's debut full-length are infectious blasts, when Kline tries his hand at Kinks-y rave-ups ("Stuck to You") and sweeping orchestral pop ("Baby, It's Fact"), his overreach is a tad premature." AllMusic's Corey Apar called it "a charming album that indeed entertains," while noting it as a "somewhat uneven listen when taken as a whole."

=== Commercial performance ===
Selling 40,057 units within its first week, the album debuted at No. 13 on the US Billboard 200 albums chart, at No. 1 on the US Independent albums chart and on No. 1 at the US Internet albums chart. This response surprised executives at Drive-Thru, who in response began heavily promoting the band to pop radio. Through the help of RED and Sanctuary, it became a radio hit.

By the end of August 2006, the album had sold over 60,000 copies. By December 2006, the album has sold 150,000 copies in the United States. As of April 2007, the album has sold 343,569 copies in the United States. It was released in the United Kingdom on May 21, 2007, where it debuted at No. 17 on the UK Albums Chart.

== Track listing ==
All songs written by Forrest Kline, except for additional lyrics on "Figures A and B (Means You and Me)", "I Saw It on Your Keyboard", and "Touchdown Turnaround (Don't Give Up on Me)" from Jesse Kurvink.

| No. | Title | Length |
|---|---|---|
| 1. | "All of Your Love" | 2:56 |
| 2. | "Here (In Your Arms)" | 4:00 |
| 3. | "All Time Lows" | 2:44 |
| 4. | "Stuck to You" | 2:44 |
| 5. | "Homewrecker" | 2:31 |
| 6. | "Oh, It Is Love" | 4:00 |
| 7. | "Baby, It's Fact" | 3:17 |
| 8. | "Figures A and B (Means You and Me)" | 2:21 |
| 9. | "I Saw It on Your Keyboard" | 3:03 |
| 10. | "Touchdown Turnaround (Don't Give Up on Me)" | 2:30 |
| 11. | "Two Weeks in Hawaii" | 4:51 |

UK bonus tracks
| No. | Title | Writer(s) | Length |
|---|---|---|---|
| 12. | "Baby, It's Fact" (live from London's Mean Fiddler) | | 4:07 |
| 13. | "All of Your Love" (live from London's Mean Fiddler) | | 3:45 |
| 14. | "Shimmy Shimmy Quarter Turn" (from the Hellogoodbye EP) | Kline, Kurvink | 3:13 |

Japanese bonus tracks
| No. | Title | Writer(s) | Length |
|---|---|---|---|
| 12. | "Here (In Your Arms)" (live at House of Blues) |
| 13. | "Homewrecker" (live at House of Blues) |
| 14. | "Shimmy Shimmy Quarter Turn" (from the Hellogoodbye EP) | Kline, Kurvink | 3:13 |

=== Zombies! Aliens! Vampires! Dinosaurs! And More! ===
The album was reissued in 2008 in the US. Retitled Zombies! Aliens! Vampires! Dinosaurs! And More!, the CD/DVD combo was released with a new cover art depicting the band at a children's party. In addition to the original album, the CD features a selection of demos and alternate mixes. The bonus DVD includes a 50-minute live concert performed at the Avalon in Boston, Massachusetts on May 6, 2007 during their tour with The Hush Sound and Boys Like Girls.

Zombies! Aliens! Vampires! Dinosaurs! And More! Re-issue bonus tracks
| No. | Title | Length |
|---|---|---|
| 12. | "All Time Lows" (demo) | 2:49 |
| 13. | "All Time Lows" (demo 2) | 2:42 |
| 14. | "All Time Lows" (Gm Og Mix) | 2:56 |
| 15. | "Homewrecker" (demo) | 2:43 |
| 16. | "Figures A and B (Means You and Me)" (demo) | 2:24 |
| 17. | "Figures A and B (Means You and Me)" (Gm Og Mix) | 2:29 |
| 18. | "I Saw It on Your Keyboard" (demo) | 3:04 |
| 19. | "I Saw It on Your Keyboard" (Gm Og Mix) | 3:01 |
| 20. | "Touchdown Turnaround" (demo) | 3:03 |
| 21. | "Touchdown Turnaround" (demo 2) | 3:19 |
| 22. | "Touchdown Turnaround" (Gm Og Mix) | 2:56 |
| 23. | "Two Weeks in Hawaii" (demo) | 4:41 |
| 24. | "Confuscious Say Rock and Roll" (by the Fortune Cookies) | 2:18 |
| 25. | "If You Wanna I Might" (demo) | 4:15 |

Live at the Avalon, Boston, MA 05/06/07
| No. | Title | Writer(s) | Length |
|---|---|---|---|
| 1. | "All Time Lows" |
| 2. | "Shimmy Shimmy Quarter Turn" |
| 3. | "All of Your Love" |
| 4. | "Stuck to You" |
| 5. | "Dear Jamie... Sincerely Me" |
| 6. | "Bonnie Taylor Shakedown... 2K4" |
| 7. | "Baby, It's Fact" |
| 8. | "Oh, It Is Love" |
| 9. | "Call n' Return" |
| 10. | "Here (In Your Arms)" |
| 11. | "Touchdown Turnaround (Don't Give Up on Me)" |
| 12. | "Dammit" (Blink-182 cover) | Mark Hoppus, Tom DeLonge, Scott Raynor |

== Personnel ==
Personnel per booklet.

Hellogoodbye

- Forrest Kline – vocals, guitar
- Jesse Kurvink – keyboards
- Chris Profeta – drums
- Marcus Cole – bass

Additional musicians

- Stevie Blacke – mandolin (track 6)
- Jack Antonoff – mandolin (track 6), 2nd guitar (track 4)
- Matt Mahaffey – drums (tracks 4 and 6)

Production and design

- Matt Mahaffey – producer, mixing, engineer
- Jeff Turzo – producer, mixing, engineer
- Forrest Kline – additional production
- Thomas Olson – additional Pro Tools editing
- Chris James – mixing
- Tom Baker – mastering
- Jesse Ledoux – art

== Charts ==
Chart performance for Zombies! Aliens! Vampires! Dinosaurs!
| Chart (2006–2007) | Peak position |
|---|---|
| Canadian Albums (Nielsen SoundScan) | 56 |
| Irish Albums (IRMA) | 83 |
| Scottish Albums (Official Charts) | 13 |
| UK Albums (Official Charts) | 17 |
| US Billboard 200 | 13 |
| US Independent Albums (Billboard) | 1 |
| US Top Rock Albums (Billboard) | 4 |
