= Rearrange (God Lives Underwater song) =

Single by God Lives Underwater

from the album Life in the So-Called Space Age
- Released: July 14, 1998
- Length: 3:33
- Label: A&M
- Songwriter(s): David Reilly, Jeff Turzo
- Producer(s): Gary Richards

God Lives Underwater singles chronology
"Don't Know How To Be" (1996)	"Rearrange" (1998)	"From Your Mouth" (1998)

"Rearrange" is a song by the band God Lives Underwater. It was released on their album Life in the So-Called Space Age in 1998. A single was released as a promotional CD (consisting of "Rearrange" and "Rearrange (Example 1)") and also as an EP CD.

== Track listing ==
1. Rearrange (Example 1) (7:22)
2. From Your Mouth (Chris Vrenna Remix) (4:28)
3. Hush That Noise (3:07)
4. From Your Mouth (Mass Hystereo Remix) (5:01)
5. Rearrange (Example 2) (7:18)
