= From Your Mouth =

Single by God Lives Underwater

from the album Life in the So-Called Space Age
- Released: May 19, 1998
- Genre: Industrial rock, trip hop, rock
- Length: 3:50
- Label: A&M
- Songwriter(s): David Reilly, Jeff Turzo
- Producer(s): Gary Richards

God Lives Underwater singles chronology
"Rearrange" (1998)	"From Your Mouth" (1998)	"Fame" (2001)

"From Your Mouth" is a song by the band God Lives Underwater. It was originally released on their 1998 album Life in the So-Called Space Age, resulting in significant airplay. The song appeared in the Daria episode "Pierce Me" and in the 2000 movie Gossip.

== Background ==
The band's biography said, "'From Your Mouth’ is an excellent example of how GLU writes songs by deconstructing standard pop notions, then reconstructing them in their signature manner.” However, David Reilly said the subject matter was so personal that he refused to discuss it, and Jeff Turzo didn't like to explain specific meanings behind songs.

== Track listing ==
1. From Your Mouth (album version)
2. From Your Mouth (Mass Hystereo remix)
3. Hush That Noise
4. Medicated to the One I Love

== Music video ==
Their 1998 single "From Your Mouth" peaked at #17 on Billboard's Modern Rock Tracks chart, supported by an unusual music video directed by Roman Coppola, featuring champion hot-dog eater Hirofumi Nakajima removing vast quantities of food 'from his mouth'. The video footage is actually a single take played in reverse, which was achieved after five other takes.
