= Life in the So-Called Space Age =

Studio album by God Lives Underwater
- Released: March 24, 1998
- Genre: Industrial rock, electronic rock, techno
- Length: 72:32
- Label: 1500; A&M
- Producer: Gary Dobbins

God Lives Underwater chronology
Empty (1995)	Life in the So-Called Space Age (1998)	Up Off the Floor (2004)

Life in the So-Called Space Age is the second studio album by American electronic rock band God Lives Underwater. The title comes from the cover of the Depeche Mode album Black Celebration, where it appears in quotes on the back, while the front cover features skyscrapers from the Kuala Lumpur city center, fitted with clear domes. The song "From Your Mouth" appeared in the 2000 film Gossip.

== Reception ==
Professional ratings
Review scores
Source	Rating
Allmusic	4/5 stars
Collector's Guide to Heavy Metal	0/10
Entertainment Weekly	B+
Pitchfork	3.2/10

Ned Raggett of Allmusic wrote of their influences, "rather than simply cloning [Depeche Mode]'s own style in the fashion of bands like Camouflage, the integration of that approach with God Lives Underwater's own murky rock is even better than before." Marc Weingarten of Entertainment Weekly wrote, "Whether this is a Ween-like exercise in genre parody or an earnest effort is debatable, but either way, it's good weird fun." Annie Marie Cruz of CMJ New Music Monthly called it "a tolerable album filled with nothing you haven't heard before". Chuck Eddy of Spin wrote that the album uses less guitars than their previous releases and recommended it to fans of OK Computer, though he found it too lacking in aggression.

== Track listing ==
All songs written by David Reilly and Jeff Turzo.

1. "Intro" – 0:58
2. "Rearrange" – 3:33
3. "From Your Mouth" – 4:43
4. "Can't Come Down" – 5:05
5. "Alone Again" – 3:18
6. "Behavior Modification" – 3:55
7. "The Rush Is Loud" – 4:08
8. "Dress Rehearsal for Reproduction" – 4:25
9. "Happy?" – 5:13
10. "Vapors" – 4:50
11. "Medicated to the One I Love" – 32:24 (includes hidden tracks "Life In The So-Called Space Age" [25:52] and "Outro" [0:59])

== Personnel ==
- David Reilly – lead vocals, keyboards, programming
- Jeff Turzo – guitars, bass, keyboards, programming
- Andrew McGee – guitars
- Adam Kary – drums

== Chart positions ==
Chart	Peak Position
Heatseekers	6
The Billboard 200	137
