= Hynes Convention Center =

Convention center in Boston, Massachusetts

John B. Hynes Veterans Memorial Convention Center
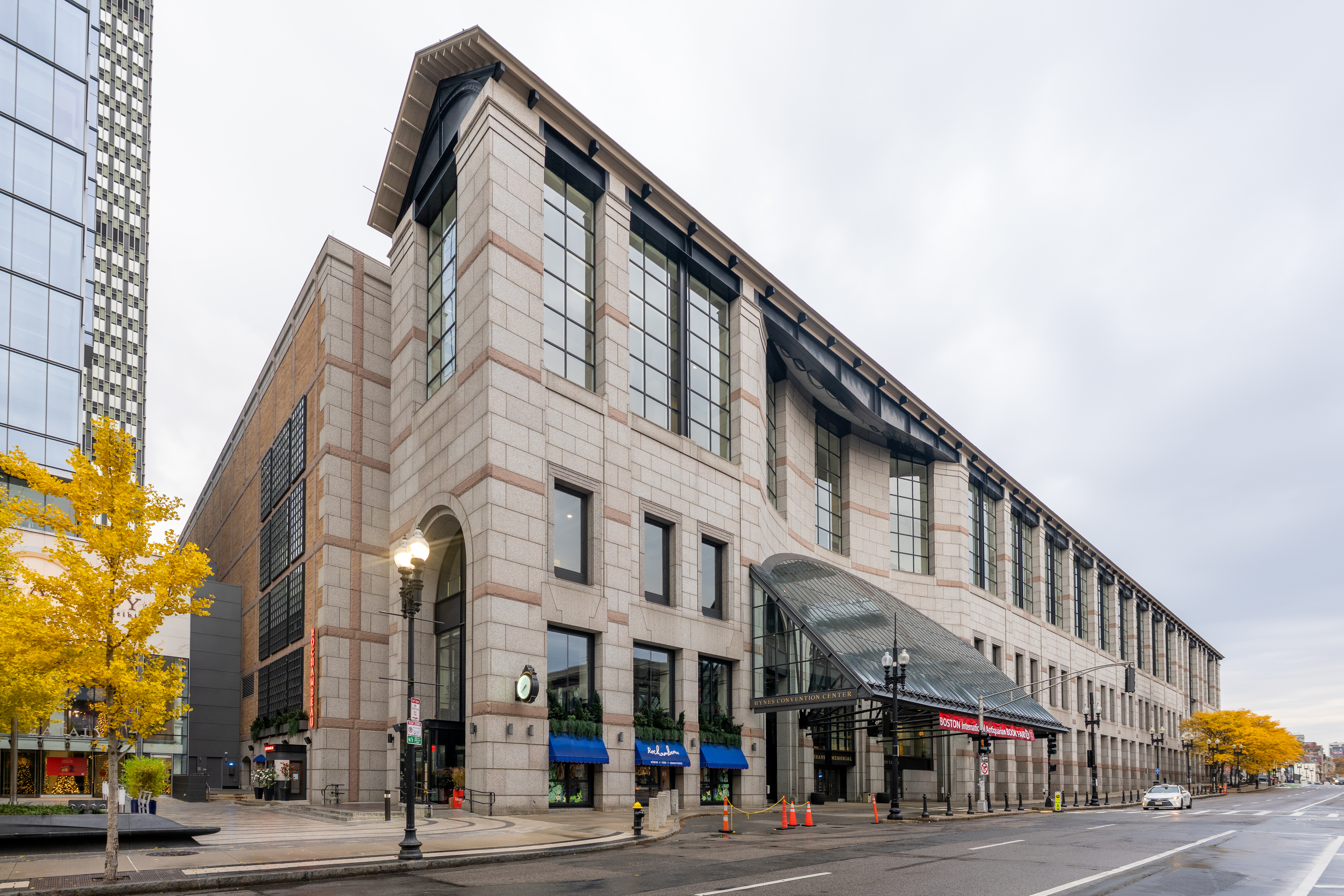
- Interactive map of John B. Hynes Veterans Memorial Convention Center
- Address: 900 Boylston Street; Boston, Massachusetts 02115; United States
- Coordinates: 42°20′51″N 71°5′3″W
- Owner: Massachusetts Convention Center Authority
- Operator: MCCA

Construction
- Built: 1968
- Opened: 1968
- Renovated: 1988

Website
- www.signatureboston.com/hynes

The John B. Hynes Veterans Memorial Convention Center is a convention center located in Boston, Massachusetts. It was built in 1988 from a design by architects Kallmann, McKinnell & Wood. It replaced the John B. Hynes Memorial Auditorium, also a convention center, built in 1963 during the Massachusetts Turnpike expansion from Route 128 to the Central Artery, which was regarded as "ungainly". The 1988 design "attempted to relate in scale and materials to its Back Bay setting, adopting granite and setbacks. The severe gray interior is reminiscent of an early 20th-century German railroad station". The Center is named after former Boston mayor John Hynes.

== Function as meeting space ==
=== Physical characteristics ===
The building has 176,480 square feet (16,400 m^{2}) of exhibit space and can accommodate up to four concurrent events. It features 91,000 square feet (8,450 m^{2}) of meeting space with 38 permanent rooms and a 24,544-square-foot (2,280 m^{2}) grand ballroom.

=== Notable past events ===
- Anime Boston occupies the Hynes annually with approximately 25,000 attendees each year.
- Berklee College of Music Berklee High School Jazz Festival
- CollegeFest
- First Night Boston
- Harvard Model Congress
- Harvard Model United Nations
- iGEM Giant Jamboree
- Oireachtas Rince na Cruinne, the World Irish Dance Championships, 2013

== Location ==
The convention center is connected to the nearby Prudential Center complex.

=== Transportation ===
The convention center is connected by aerial passageways to a nearby hotel complex and can be reached by public transportation via the Hynes Convention Center station on the MBTA Green Line and, using the passageways, via the Back Bay station on the Orange Line, Commuter Rail, and Amtrak. Logan Express shuttles run directly to and from Logan International Airport.

=== Nearby hotels ===
- Colonnade Hotel Boston is connected underground via the Prudential Center T Stop and Prudential Mall.
- Copley Square Hotel
- Newbury Guest House
- Mandarin Oriental, Boston
- Hilton Back Bay
- Sheraton Boston is directly connected to the convention center.
- Marriott Copley Place is connected to the convention center via the Copley Place Mall.
- Westin Copley Place is connected to the convention center via the Copley Place Mall.

=== Closure and redevelopment ===
On September 16, 2019, Governor Charlie Baker announced his plans to close and sell the Hynes to finance an expansion at the Boston Convention and Exhibition Center.

== Gallery ==
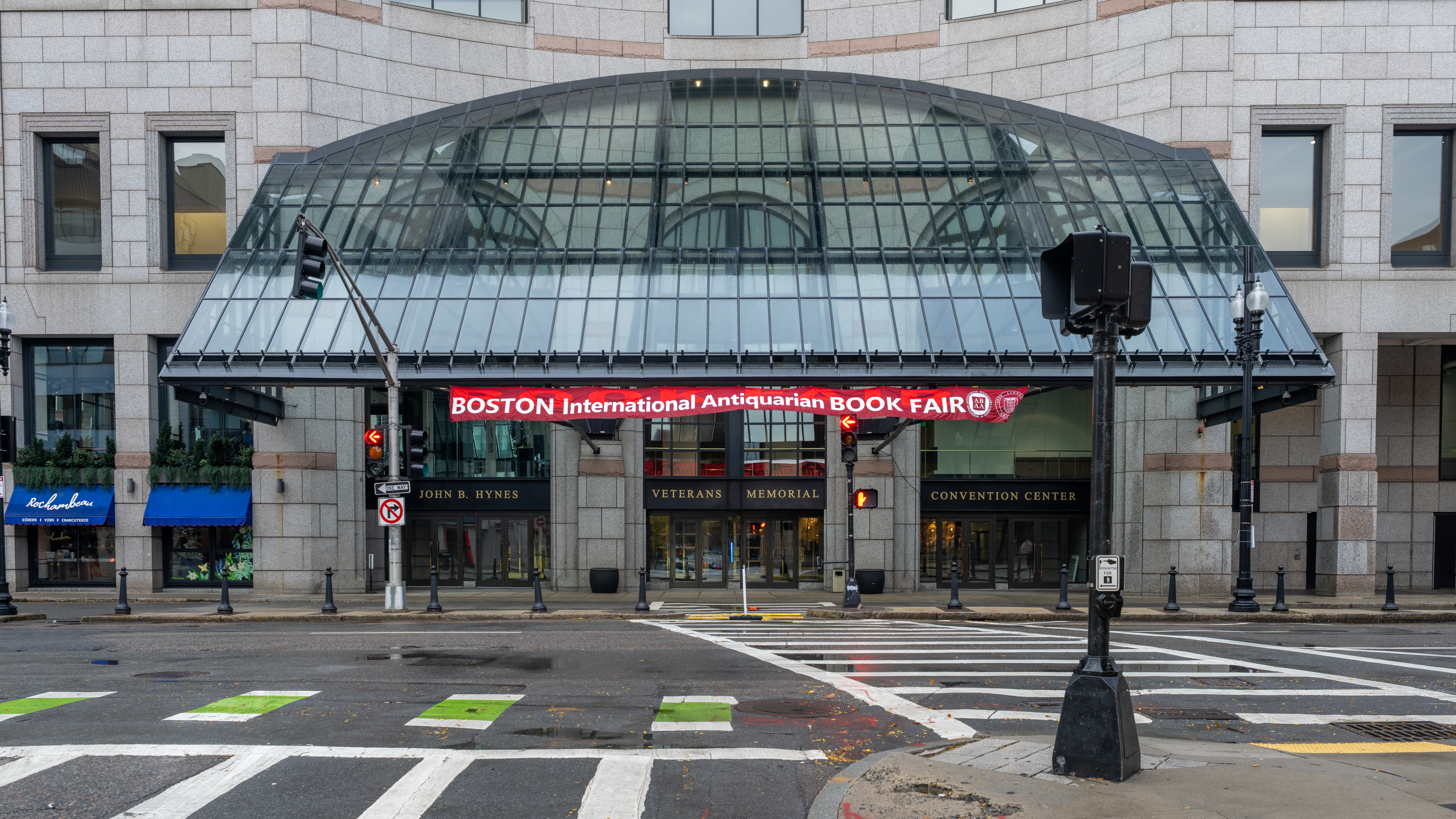
Boylston Street Facade, 2025

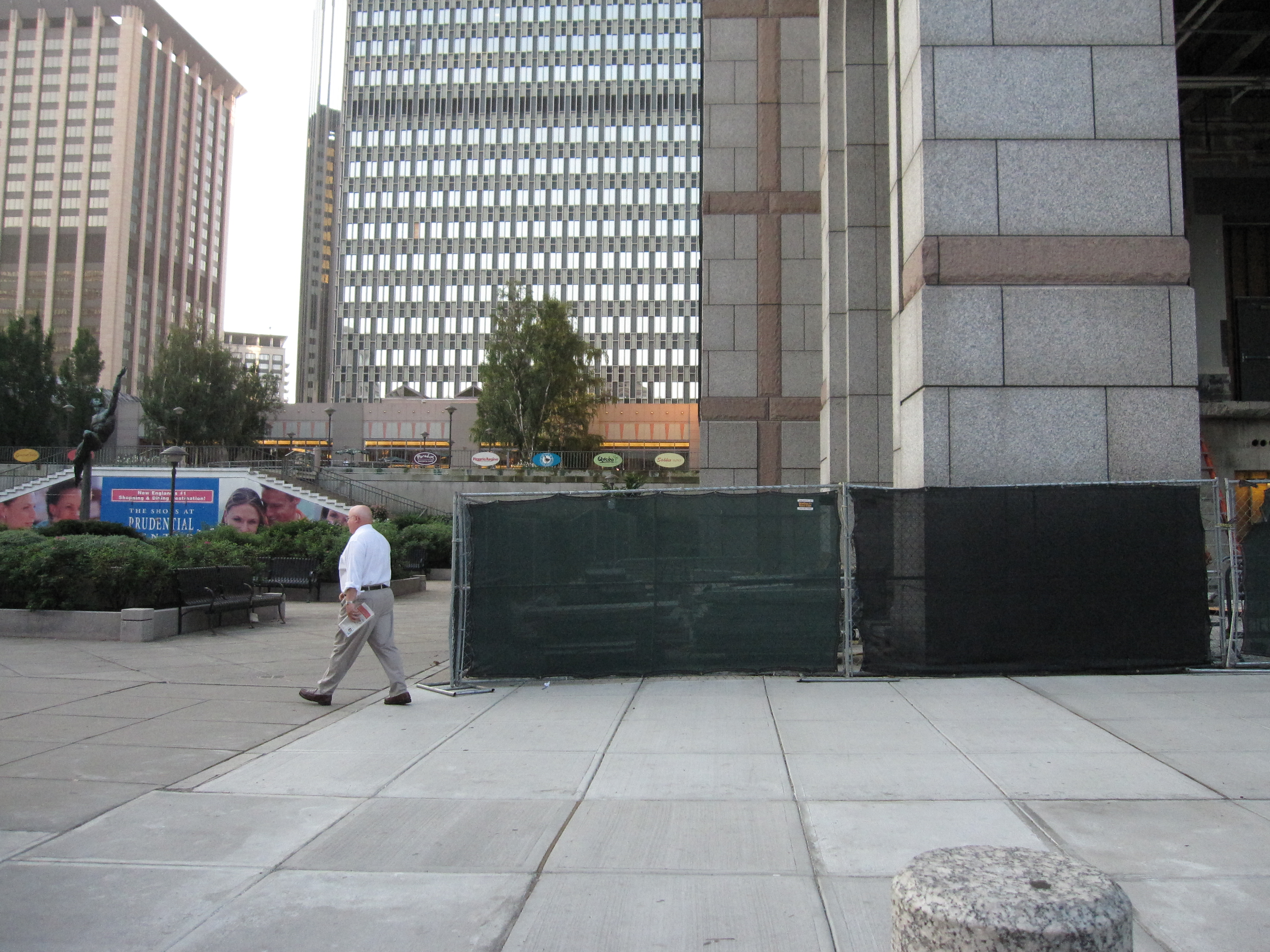
East facade looking south, 2009

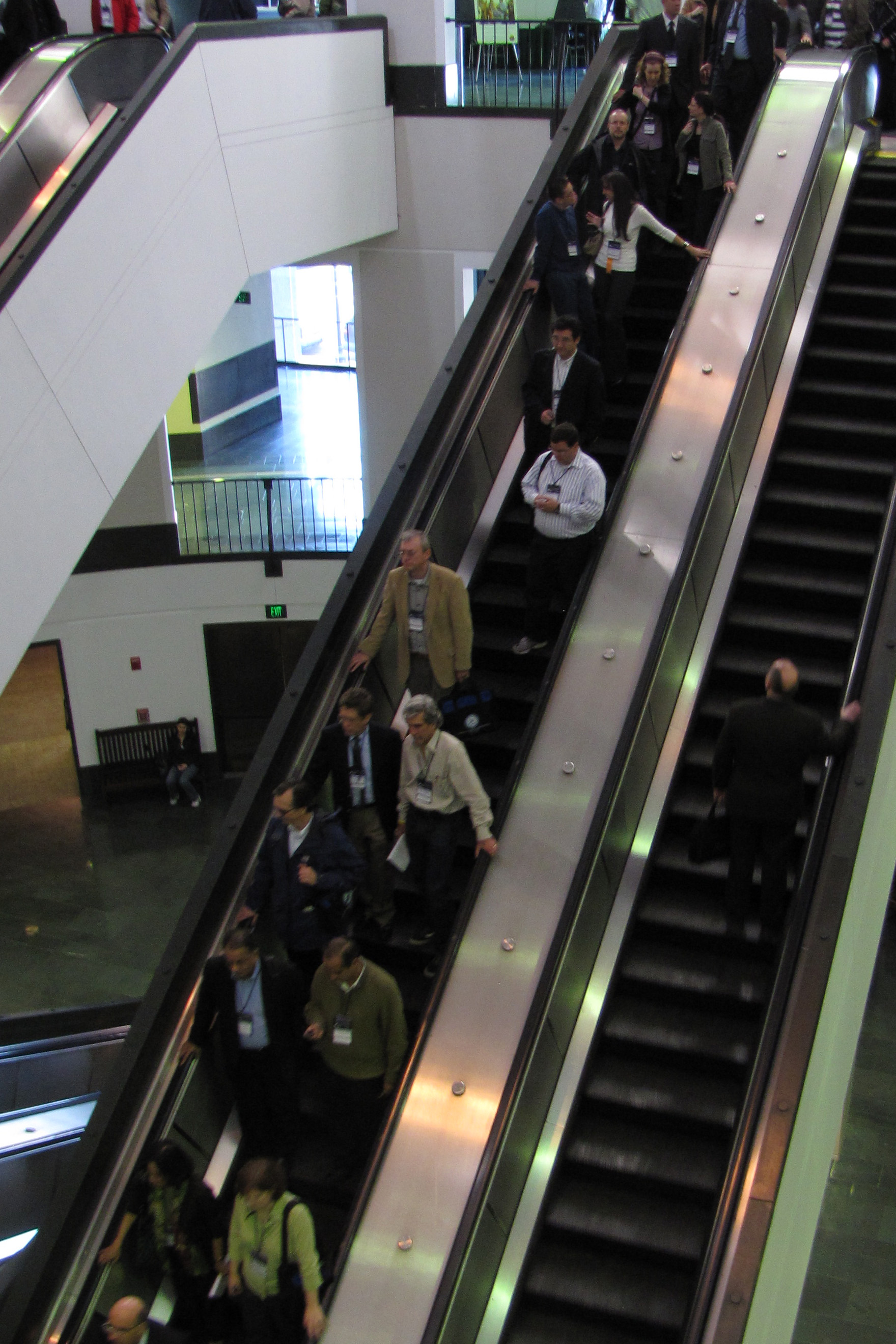
Interior escalator, 2009

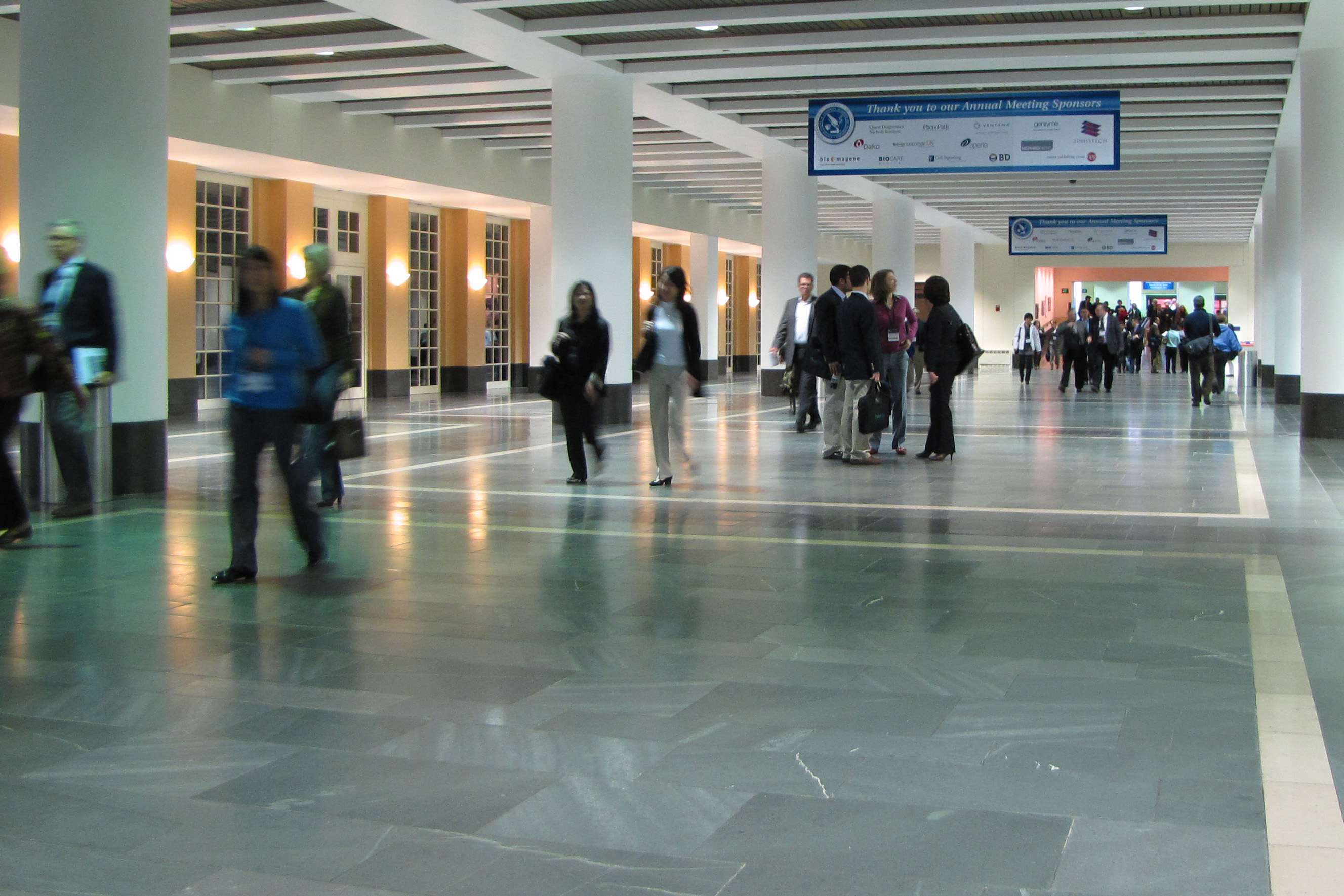
Interior corridor, 2009
