= Empty (God Lives Underwater album) =

Studio album by God Lives Underwater
- Released: September 12, 1995
- Studio: Home
- Genre: Industrial rock, techno
- Length: 42:58
- Label: American
- Producer: God Lives Underwater, Gary Richards

God Lives Underwater chronology
God Lives Underwater (1994)	Empty (1995)	Life in the So-Called Space Age (1998)

Professional ratings
Review scores
Source	Rating
AllMusic	3/5 stars

Empty is God Lives Underwater's first full-length album and second major release overall, released in October 1995 via American Recordings. Several songs from this album have featured in movies: "Tortoise" was used in the movie National Lampoon's Senior Trip, "No More Love" was used in Johnny Mnemonic, and "Weight"—an outtake from Empty—was featured in Mortal Kombat: More Kombat.

== Track listing ==
All songs written by David Reilly and Jeff Turzo, except where noted.

=== Original version ===
1. "Still" – 3:28
2. "All Wrong" – 4:55
3. "Fool" – 4:11
4. "Empty" – 4:06
5. "Don't Know How to Be" – 3:35
6. "No More Love" – 4:18
7. "23" – 4:05
8. "We Were Wrong" (Andrew McGee, Reilly, Turzo) – 3:08
9. "Weaken" – 5:31
10. "Tortoise" – 2:57
11. "Scared" – 2:44

== Personnel ==
God Lives Underwater

- David Reilly - lead vocals, keyboards, programming
- Jeff Turzo - guitars, bass, keyboards, programming
- Andrew McGee - guitars
- Adam Kary - drums
