= Would It Kill You? =

2010 album by Hellogoodbye

Studio album by Hellogoodbye
- Released: November 9, 2010
- Genres: Folk, indie rock, folk pop, power pop
- Length: 35:38
- Label: Wasted Summer
- Producer: Forrest Kline

Hellogoodbye chronology
Zombies! Aliens! Vampires! Dinosaurs! (2006)	Would It Kill You? (2010)	Everything Is Debatable (2013)

Singles from Would It Kill You?
- 1. "When We First Met" Released: June 22, 2010

Would It Kill You? is the second studio album by Hellogoodbye. It was released on November 9, 2010. "When We First Met", the album's lead single, was released for free download on September 5, 2009. The album was produced by Forrest Kline, the frontman for the group.

Would It Kill You? was released four years after the band's break-through record Zombies! Aliens! Vampires! Dinosaurs!; the delay was largely due to a lawsuit between the band and its then-current label Drive-Thru Records. Once the lawsuit was settled, the Hellogoodbye was released from their contract and released Would It Kill You? independently. Musically, the album features heavy use of real instruments, in contrast to the band's previous efforts, which relied on computerized effects like auto-tune, and keyboards. Lyrically, the album delves into many issues surrounding romance.

Would It Kill You? was met with largely positive reviews, with many critics applauding the band's change in direction and its musical maturation. Financed by the band themselves and released on their very own Wasted Summer label, the album peaked at number 104 on the Billboard 200, where it remained for one week. The album also charted at number 22 on the Billboard Top Rock Albums chart, and number 12 on the Billboard Independent Albums chart.

== Production ==
=== Background ===
After releasing 2006's successful Zombies! Aliens! Vampires! Dinosaurs!, Hellogoodbye anticipated releasing an album sometime in 2008. However, the band soon got involved in a lawsuit with its then-record label, Drive-Thru Records. The lawsuit halted production on the album for a "year and a half", forcing the band to record "off and on". Eventually, the lawsuit was finalized, and Hellogoodbye was released from their contract. During this time, keyboardist Jesse Kurvink left the band, to be replaced by Joe Marro. The group also added Ryan Daly as a second guitarist. In November 2008, the band posted a demo of "The Thoughts That Give Me the Creeps" on their Myspace profile. It was mentioned that their next album would be released some time in 2009. Later in November, "Betrayed by Bones" was posted online. In February and March 2009, the band toured Australia as part of the Soundwave festival. In August 2009, the band went on a tour of the US with Fun, Limbeck and My Favorite Highway. Alternative Press reported that a 7" vinyl and album would following after the tour's conclusion.

=== Music ===
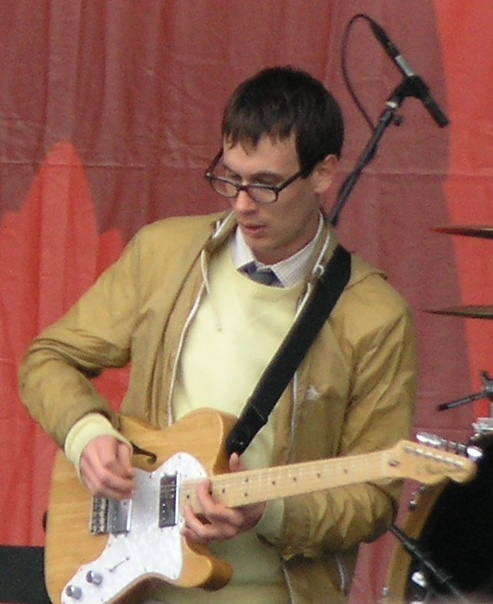
Hellogoodbye frontman and album producer Forrest Kline sought to minimize auto-tune on Would It Kill You?

Musically, Kline said that the album features "more acoustic guitar, more real instruments". He explained that on previous albums, the electronic instruments and manipulation were used because the band did not have access to certain sounds; however, most of the music on Would it Kill You? "is … someone performing" the instruments. Kline felt that the "opportunity to expand [his] collection of instruments and having more access to actual instruments and people that play things" was what caused the shift in the band's sound. Kline also sought to minimize the use of auto-tune on the album. Its presence on Zombies! Aliens! Vampires! Dinosaurs! was largely due to said record having been recorded in a home studio; Kline felt that, at the time, the effect was "awesome" and "allure[ing]" because it was experimental. However, once the effect began to saturate pop music, Kline liked it less and less. The entire album was recorded in Kline's "garage-turned-studio".

== Release ==
Due to the fact that the band had left Drive-Thru Records, Hellogoodbye decided to release Would It Kill You? independently. The group released it on their very own Wasted Summer Records; Kline explained, "We wanted to put it out ourselves, so we figured we’re adults and that we can handle a little bit of business. So we started that and got distribution with it, it’s just kind of a name for putting out this record basically." However, he did note that, without the backing of a major label, the band was forced to use most of their personal money to finance the record, which was both "scary" and "exciting". "When We First Met" was the album's lead single, and it was released for free download on September 5, 2009, including the B-side "Not Ever Coming Home" and the music video. The video for the song, which was posted online later in the month, was produced, directed, and edited by Isaac Ravishankara. Between January and March 2010, the band supported New Found Glory on their headlining US tour. In late September and early October 2011, the band toured Australia as part of the Soundwave Counter-Revolution festival.

== Reception ==
=== Critical response ===
Professional ratings
Review scores
Source	Rating
AbsolutePunk	95%
AllMusic	4.5/5 stars
Slant Magazine	3.5/5 stars
USA Today	3.5/4 stars

Would It Kill You? was met with largely positive reviews, with many critics applauding the band's change in direction, and complimenting the increased use of acoustic guitar, and the decreased use of auto-tuned vocals. Thomas Nassiff of AbsolutePunk awarded the album a grade of 95%, and called it "more substantial" than any of the band's previous releases. Furthermore, he wrote that "Forrest Kline has perhaps outdone himself"; he praised the band's lyrical and musical maturation, complimenting most highly the songs that feature Kline "belting out charming lyrics at a million miles an hour [while] the rest of the band is keeping the blistering pace with the same intensity." Tin Sendra of AllMusic awarded the album four-and-a-half stars out of five, writing that it sounds more like "The Zombies or The Kinks rather than Jimmy Eat World or Weezer." Sendra complimented the album for being "the sound of a guy coming out from behind the tricks he used to hide behind and laying himself bare"; furthermore, he applauded the album for having "no Auto-Tune, no novelty songs, and very few moments that would lead you to think the band would be welcome on a Warped Tour stage." Edna Gundersen of USA Today commented on the band's growth, noting that they shied away from the use of "electronic filler", and instead focused on "sturdy instrumental interplay". In addition, she wrote that the record explored the "darker complexities of romance" rather than "the corny confines of high school diaries".

Kevin Liedel of Slant Magazine awarded Would It Kill You three-and-a-half stars out of five and called it an "ironically refreshing change of pace" because it is the "band following its natural instincts in the face of producing something edgier but far less sincere." Joshua Khan of Blare Magazine gave the album three stars out of five, but was less complimentary, writing that "Would It Kill You? may still be a candy-coated disc but it’s an album that takes a stab in the dark, even if it pierces a damsel with a soft spot for lovesick seventh grade poetry."

=== Commercial performance ===
Would It Kill You? was released on November 9, 2010, and charted at number 104 on the Billboard 200; the album only managed to chart for a single week before falling off. However, the record also charted on the Billboard Top Rock Albums chart—peaking at number 22 and remaining for one week—and the Billboard Independent Albums chart—peaking at number 12 and remaining for three weeks.

== Track listing ==
All tracks are written by Forrest Kline.

No.	Title	Length
1.	"Finding Something to Do"	2:56
2.	"Getting Old"	3:00
3.	"When We First Met"	2:35
4.	"Betrayed by Bones"	3:25
5.	"You Sleep Alone"	3:38
6.	"When We First Kissed"	3:15
7.	"The Thoughts That Give Me the Creeps"	2:54
8.	"I Never Can Relax"	3:34
9.	"Coppertone"	4:04
10.	"Would It Kill You?"	3:38
11.	"Something You Misplaced"	3:39

Deluxe Edition bonus tracks
No.	Title	Length
12.	"Not Ever Coming Home (b-side)"	2:53
13.	"Finding Something to Do (Live from Daytrotter's Barnstormer Tour)"	3:08
14.	"The Thoughts That Give Me the Creeps (Live from Daytrotter's Barnstormer Tour)"	3:22
15.	"When We First Met (Live from Daytrotter's Barnstormer Tour)"	2:49

== Charts ==
Chart	Peak position
US Billboard 200	104
US Billboard Top Rock Albums	22
US Billboard Independent Albums	12
