= No More Love =

Single by God Lives Underwater

from the album God Lives Underwater
- Released: 1994
- Genre: Industrial rock, techno
- Length: 11:02
- Label: American Recordings
- Songwriter: David Reilly
- Producer: Rick Rubin

God Lives Underwater singles chronology
"No More Love" (1994)	"All Wrong" (1995)

"No More Love" is a song by the band God Lives Underwater. It was originally released on their self-titled EP album God Lives Underwater in 1994, although it receiver wider exposure when the EP was released by American Recordings in early 1995. The song was featured in the 1995 movie Johnny Mnemonic.

== Track listing ==
1. No More Love - Rock Mix (3:26)
2. No More Love - Edit (3:21)
3. No More Love - LP Version (4:16)

== Music video ==
Clark Eddy directed the first music video. It features the band playing outside around a nuclear power plant with smoke stacks burning, suggesting they are playing during a nuclear meltdown. The music video was featured in the PlayStation game Slamscape.

A second video was filmed as a tie-in to Johnny Mnemonic. It features footage of the band performing, intercut with footage from the film.
