= Gregg Hale (musician) =

- Born: Gregory Hale; January 29; Idaho Falls, Idaho United States
- Genres: Alternative rock Post-rock; Indie rock
- Occupations: Musician, producer, recording
- Instruments: Guitar, bass
- Years active: 1995—present
- Labels: Arista Records, Handsome Rob Records

Gregg Hale (born January 29, in Idaho Falls) is an American musician, record producer, and recording engineer best known for playing guitar for multi-platinum British band Spiritualized, his work as an A&R Rep for Arista Records, and his recording work with the Fox Soccer Channel, The Glenn Beck Program, Disney, Disney Interactive Studios, Activision, CNBC, NBC, KONAMI, and Guitar Hero.

== Musical history ==
Hale played in many bands, but in 1997, while living in Liverpool England, he met Sean Cook, Mike Mooney, and Damon Reece, all members of multi-platinum band Spiritualized. He played guitar with Spiritualized in 1997 and 1998 in tours supporting their album Ladies and Gentlemen We Are Floating in Space, which NME magazine named as their Album of the Year. He left the band in 1998, several months before Cook, Mooney and Reece left the band, but remains good friends with the current members, especially guitar player Doggen.

== Post-Spiritualized ==
Since his time with Spiritualized, he has moved back to America, and worked as an A&R rep for several record labels, including Arista Records. He currently splits time between Idaho Falls, Idaho, and Salt Lake City, Utah.

In 2005, he and David Reilly, formerly of God Lives Underwater, began collaborating on a new project, but Reilly died unexpectedly on October 16, 2005, from complications of a coma brought on by pain medication for an abscessed tooth.

As a producer, he founded and owns the record label Handsome Rob Records and Lincoln Street Sound Studio in Salt Lake, and has judged many music and battle-of-the-bands competitions. He has recorded many bands, as well as played guitar and bass, among other instruments, on many albums as a session musician. He has also done extensive recording work for Fox, and Fox Soccer Channel.

== See also ==
- Spiritualized
