= God Lives Underwater =

American rock band

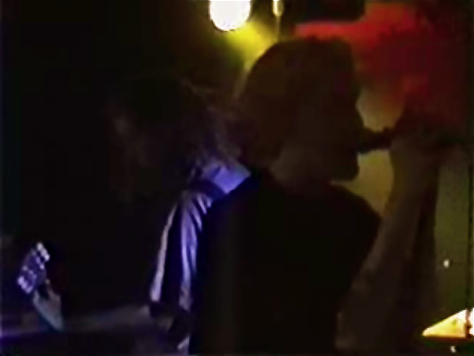
- God Lives Underwater performing in 1998

Background information
- Also known as: G.L.U.
- Origin: Perkiomenville, Pennsylvania, United States
- Genres: Industrial rock; electronic rock; techno; industrial metal; alternative metal
- Years active: 1993–2005
- Labels: Onion/American, 1500/A&M, Locomotive/Megaforce
- Spinoffs: Wired All Wrong
- Past members: David Reilly; Jeff Turzo; Andrew McGee; Adam Kary; Dave Alverado; Scott Garrett

God Lives Underwater was an American rock band, formed in 1993 in Perkiomenville, Pennsylvania, by vocalist/programmer David Reilly and guitarist/programmer Jeff Turzo. They were later joined by guitarist Andrew McGee and drummer Adam Kary (who was replaced by Scott Garrett in 1998). After recording a self-titled EP in late 1993 and self-distributing it the following year, the band signed to Rick Rubin's label American Recordings, and the EP was nationally released in early 1995. Later that same year, the band released the full-length album Empty. God Lives Underwater then signed with A&M Records and released Life in the So-Called Space Age in 1998, which spawned their most successful single, "From Your Mouth". After a period of internal issues and label shifts, the band's final album was released in 2004, Up Off the Floor. Reilly then unexpectedly died at the age of 34 on October 16, 2005.

== History ==
=== Formation and God Lives Underwater (1993–1995) ===
David Reilly had recorded various home demos in the late 1980s and early 1990s as he handled the vast majority of the vocals and instruments on his own. Jeff Turzo was a studio engineer creating remixes and assisting in the studio for artists such as Pop's Cool Love and Fishbone, among others. Reilly and Turzo had attended the same high school together in the town of Perkiomenville, Pennsylvania (near the city of Philadelphia), and after graduation, the duo decided to form a band that had electronica and industrial influences, eventually named God Lives Underwater. In late 1993, they recorded a six-track demo tape on their own. Throughout 1994, the pair had self-released the EP (titled God Lives Underwater) as they also passed it on to various labels and friends. Prolific producer Rick Rubin obtained the EP and subsequently signed the duo to his label American Recordings. Reilly and Turzo then decided to transform their project into a full-fledged band; thus, they added drummer Adam Kary and guitarist Andrew McGee to the lineup. American then gave God Lives Underwater a proper national release in January 1995. It gained coverage in various publications as it peaked at No. 82 on CMJ's Radio Top 150 chart. "No More Love" was released as the sole single, and a music video was produced which, depicted the band outdoors near a nuclear power plant. Around the same time, "Drag Me Down", also from God Lives Underwater, had appeared in the comedy film The Doom Generation.

About four months after the release of God Lives Underwater, "No More Love" was featured during the end credits of the film Johnny Mnemonic and was included on its soundtrack. Another music video was created for the track, which intertwined scenes of Johnny Mnemonic and of the band. During the first half of 1995, God Lives Underwater went on a national tour, co-headlining with the band Maids of Gravity (which was formed by former Medicine founding members Eddie Ruscha and Jim Putnam). At a June show in Rochester, New York, Reilly had attempted to hype the fans in attendance. Numerous people then started to throw objects at the security guards and police officers, and the officers ended up using pepper spray on the audience. Kary was physically assaulted and maced while Reilly was arrested, and he spent the night at the local jail along with a dozen other fans. He was later charged with a misdemeanor for inciting a riot. He pled guilty and was sentenced to 40 hours of community service. Around the same time, Reilly and Turzo recorded two songs ("Someone Else" and "Lost") for a Nitrus Records compilation (simply titled The Compilation) under the alias of Heavy. McGee had also contributed two tracks to the compilation ("Sunking" and "Track #12") under the alias of Sputnik.

=== Empty and increased activity (1995–1997) ===
God Lives Underwater recorded their full-length album throughout 1995. In September 1995, the song "Tortoise" (off of the then-upcoming album) was featured in the movie National Lampoon's Senior Trip. The following month, American released the band's full-length album Empty. It peaked at No. 83 on CMJ's Top 200 chart. "No More Love" was included on its tracklist, while both "All Wrong" and "Don't Know How to Be" were released as the album's singles. The video for "All Wrong" had exclusively premiered on MTV's 120 Minutes program. God Lives Underwater initially embarked on a tour of the U.S. with KMFDM, and they followed it with a tour of Europe with Filter. Afterwards, they headlined their own tour throughout the U.S. and then opened for Spacehog. After a show in Florida, God Lives Underwater was kicked off Spacehog's tour. God Lives Underwater claimed that they were drawing in more fans and selling more merchandise than Spacehog which led to the majority of the attendees leaving prior to Spacehog's performance; however, Spacehog claimed that God Lives Underwater's fans were too violent and had caused too much trouble during the shows.

In early 1996, God Lives Underwater had recorded the music for the shooting video game Slamscape, released on PlayStation and PC. They had created original compositions for the in-game music. The videos for "No More Love" (the original 1994 version), "Don't Know How to Be", and "All Wrong" were included as bonus content. Slamscape received below-average reviews, although many critics praised the band's contributions. Also in 1996, God Lives Underwater contributed the song "Weight" to the Mortal Kombat: More Kombat compilation. It was an outtake from the Empty recording sessions. The band also toured with Far for a brief U.S. tour in the middle of 1996. Towards the end of the year, the band decided to add a fifth member to the lineup, Dave Alverado. He was on-stage as an extra bassist in an attempt to make the band's live-sound thicker; however, by 1997, Alverado was no longer in the band, and the lineup reverted to four members. After the extensive touring schedule, God Lives Underwater's manager Gary Richards, started his own label, 1500 Records. They were in a partnership with the major label A&M Records for distribution purposes, and God Lives Underwater became one of the first acts signed with the label.

=== Life in the So-Called Space Age and mainstream success (1997–2000) ===
In 1997, God Lives Underwater went to Los Angeles, California, to record their follow-up album with producer Gary Dobbins. During the recording process, there were creative tensions with drummer Kary. Afterwards, he was dismissed from the band and was ultimately replaced by Scott Garrett. Garrett was previously a member of The Cult and also Pop's Cool Love, with whom Turzo worked in the early 1990s.

The resulting album, Life in the So-Called Space Age, was released in March 1998. It became the band's best-selling effort (eventually selling over 90,000 copies) as it peaked at No. 6 on Billboard's Heatseekers chart and at No. 137 on the Billboard 200 chart. Its lead single, "From Your Mouth", appeared on Billboard's Modern Rock Tracks chart at No. 17 and on R&R's Alternative Top 50 chart at No. 18. Its music video was directed by Roman Coppola (the son of famed director Francis Ford Coppola). The video was a single take played in reverse, and it featured champion hot-dog eater Hirofumi Nakajima taking food out of his mouth. The album's song "Rearrange" was also released as a single, but it failed to match its predecessor's success. God Lives Underwater supported Life in the So-Called Space Age by embarking on a U.S. tour with Stabbing Westward and Econoline Crush.

Also in 1998, God Lives Underwater was at the helm of the Depeche Mode tribute album For the Masses, released on 1500. They had kick-started the project and had recorded a cover of "Fly on the Windscreen" for the compilation. Other artists that were brought in for the compilation included The Cure, Failure, The Smashing Pumpkins, GusGus, Veruca Salt, Dishwalla, Meat Beat Manifesto, Monster Magnet, Apollo 440, Deftones, Rammstein, Rabbit in the Moon, Self, Locust, and Hooverphonic. The compilation eventually peaked at No. 69 on the Billboard 200 chart.

=== Various issues and Up Off the Floor (2000–2004) ===
God Lives Underwater had begun recording their subsequent album in 2000, but various problems emerged. The band's manager, Richards, and his 1500 label had faced financial difficulty. They were unable to sufficiently promote God Lives Underwater, and Richards eventually sold the label to the website Riffage. In addition, tragedy struck the band when Reilly's fiancée, Monica "Seven" Young, was accidentally killed on foot by a train while crossing the tracks with headphones on. Her death had impacted Reilly greatly, and his drug usage increased as a result. He also spent time in various jails and facilities, and claimed to be homeless at one point as well.

The band played a live show on July 13, 2000, in Hollywood, California. A few songs in their setlist were tracks off of the band's then-upcoming album; however, the live show ultimately ended up being the band's final performance. They continued recording regardless of the various issues, and in early 2001, the band contributed a cover of David Bowie's "Fame" to the soundtrack of the film 15 Minutes (which starred Robert De Niro and Edward Burns). "Fame" was also released as a standalone single to promote the soundtrack. The single ended up being the final God Lives Underwater release by 1500, as shortly after, 1500's then-new parent company Riffage had declared bankruptcy, thus dropping the band before their album was released.

From 2001 to 2003, God Lives Underwater was mostly inactive as the members pursued different projects. Turzo got married and then focused on studio work for various bands such as Incubus, Taproot, and Lostprophets. Garrett briefly rejoined The Cult and also worked with artists such as Kottonmouth Kings, The Mission UK, and J. McGee took a break from the music industry and didn't appear with any other acts during that time. Reilly released a solo album titled Robot Teen America in May 2001. He then reconciled with God Lives Underwater's original drummer, Kary, and they formed the band Fluzee in 2002. They released an EP that same year before disbanding.

In late 2003, the Spanish label Locomotive Music (owned by Megaforce Records) had bought the rights to release God Lives Underwater's completed album. They had reportedly paid the band upfront to exclusively release it. The album, titled Up Off the Floor, was officially released in early 2004, but it contained numerous errors. There were various grammatical errors in the liner notes, two songs from the same era were excluded from the tracklist (the aforementioned "Fame" cover and also the outtake "Choir Boy"), and the album itself was not sourced from the master recordings; thus, the volume and mix were lowered, and the quality suffered as a result. Promotional copies of Up Off the Floor had also existed, which had superior audio quality, and overall, the band members were dismissive of the Locomotive pressing; however, Locomotive attempted to promote the album by issuing the track "Tricked" as a radio single without much success.

=== Reilly's death and subsequent events (2004–2014) ===
After the troublesome release of Up Off the Floor, God Lives Underwater went on hiatus. The following year, Reilly decided to embark on a solo career once again. In June 2005, Reilly signed to RuffNation Records (which was a division of the major label Universal Records). He also began collaborating and recording new material centered around the death of his fiancée with former Spiritualized guitar player Gregg Hale. A few months later, Reilly died on October 16 at the age of 34. He died from complications following an open tooth infection, filling one of his lungs with blood while he was sleeping. In 2006, Turzo formed the band Wired All Wrong with Matt Mahaffey of the band Self. They both bonded over the loss of their former bandmates (as Matt Mahaffey's brother, Mike Mahaffey, also of Self had died in May 2005). Both Garrett and McGee also eventually joined Wired All Wrong as the drummer and guitarist, respectively.

In October 2007, Brian Paone (a close friend of Reilly and the band) released the book Dreams are Unfinished Thoughts, which chronicled his relationship with God Lives Underwater and Reilly in particular. In 2010, Reilly's RuffNation/Universal solo album, How Humans Rx, was released in limited form. Various other unreleased recordings by Reilly also surfaced afterwards, and Paone also updated Dreams are Unfinished Thoughts in 2014 with extra passages that detailed events from 2007 to 2014.

== Members ==
- David Reilly – lead vocals, guitars, keyboards, programming (1993–2005), died 2005
- Jeff Turzo – guitars, bass, keyboards, programming (1993–2005)
- Andrew McGee – guitars, backup vocals (1994–2005)
- Adam Kary – drums, percussion (1994–1998)
- Dave Alverado – bass (1996–1997)
- Scott Garrett – drums, percussion (1998–2005)

== Discography ==
- God Lives Underwater (1994)
- Empty (1995)
- Life in the So-Called Space Age (1998)
- Up Off the Floor (2004)
