= CollegeFest =

Student event in Boston, Massachusetts

CollegeFest, founded in 1985, is one of the United States' largest festivals targeting college students. The 2-day event takes place on an annual basis in Boston, Massachusetts, at the Hynes Convention Center. The purpose of CollegeFest is to introduce Boston's vast college student population to goods and services from local, regional, and national businesses. On average nearly 15,000 college students from over 100 New England Area colleges visit CollegeFest from institutions that include Bentley University, Boston University, Boston College, Harvard University, Northeastern University, Babson College, Regis College, and Tufts University.

Past sponsors of CollegeFest include Apple, Microsoft, Procter & Gamble, Kimberly-Clark, Ford Motors, Verizon Wireless, Xbox, Coca-Cola, Monster Energy Drink, and General Motors.

CollegeFest was founded by Commonwealth Promotion, Inc. in 1985 by Betty Rae Fulton and Carola Cadley. It began at the Commonwealth Armory at Boston University. In 2005, the rights to CollegeFest were acquired by New York-based marketing agency Mr Youth. Former Mr Youth CEO, Paul Tedeschi was an attendee of CollegeFest while a student at Boston University.

In early October 2013, the rights to CollegeFest were acquired by Boston-based marketing agency, The Campus Agency, Inc, of which Paul Tedeschi is currently the CEO.

In 2014, the event was moved to Fenway Park in Boston and turned into a one-day event.

CollegeFest 2008 occurred on September 27 and 28, 2008, at the Hynes Convention Center.

CollegeFest 2009 occurred on September 26 and 27 at the Hynes Convention Center.

CollegeFest 2010 occurred on September 11 and 12 at the Hynes Convention Center.

CollegeFest 2011 occurred on October 1 and 2 at the Hynes Convention Center.

CollegeFest 2012 occurred on September 22 and 23 at the Hynes Convention Center.

CollegeFest 2013 occurred on October 12 and 13 at the Hynes Convention Center.

CollegeFest 2014 occurred on September 13 at Fenway Park.
