= Slamscape =

1996 video game

- Developer: Viacom New Media
- Publisher: Viacom New Media: EU: Virgin Interactive
- Platforms: PlayStation, Windows
- Release: NA: October 11, 1996; EU: 1996
- Genre: Third-person shooter

Slamscape is a video game developed and published by Viacom New Media for Windows and the PlayStation. The game features an original soundtrack by God Lives Underwater.

== Gameplay ==
Slamscape is a game in which the players search an arena for hidden orbs while dealing with enemy creatures.

== Reception ==
Next Generation reviewed the PlayStation version of the game, rating it one star out of five, and stated, "Definitely not for hardcore gamers, this title is for those who don't know any better."
