= Forrest Kline =

American singer-songwriter (born 1983)

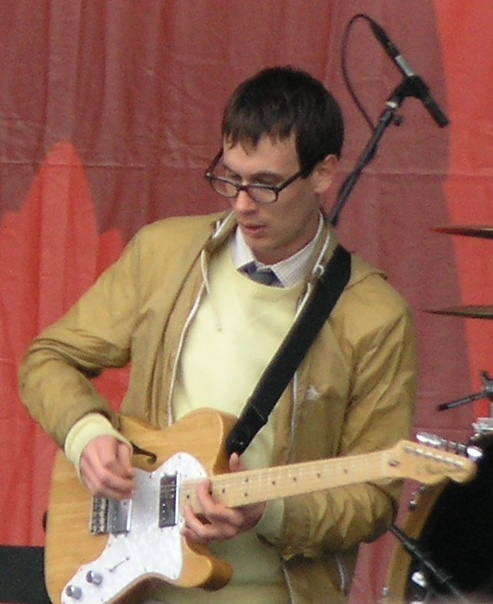
- Forrest Kline at 2007 MyCokeFest in Atlanta

Background information
- Born: Forrest Scott Kline; November 7, 1983 (age 42); Ashland, Oregon, U.S.
- Occupations: Musician; songwriter; record producer
- Instruments: Guitar; keyboards; vocals; ukulele; banjo; bass guitar; mandolin
- Label: Drive-Thru
- Member of: Hellogoodbye
- Website: www.hellogoodbye.net

Forrest Scott Kline (born November 7, 1983) is an American musician, singer, songwriter, and guitarist. He is the lead vocalist of the power pop band Hellogoodbye.

== Early life ==
He is of German descent and spent most of his childhood in Huntington Beach, California and in Palm Desert, California, and attended Huntington Beach High School, along with ex-bandmate Jesse Kurvink, during his teenage years.

== Music career ==
As part of Hellogoodbye, he won the MTV2 Dew Circuit Breakout contest.

Kline produced and recorded Never Shout Never's The Summer EP.

In 2010, he wrote or co-wrote the songs as well as produced Hellogoodbye's second LP Would It Kill You?.

== Personal life ==
On June 25, 2010, Kline married his girlfriend of six years, Chelsea, with whom he lives in Long Beach, California.

A former vegan, Kline is pescatarian and supports the animal rights group People for the Ethical Treatment of Animals (PETA).
