= Hellogoodbye =

American pop rock band

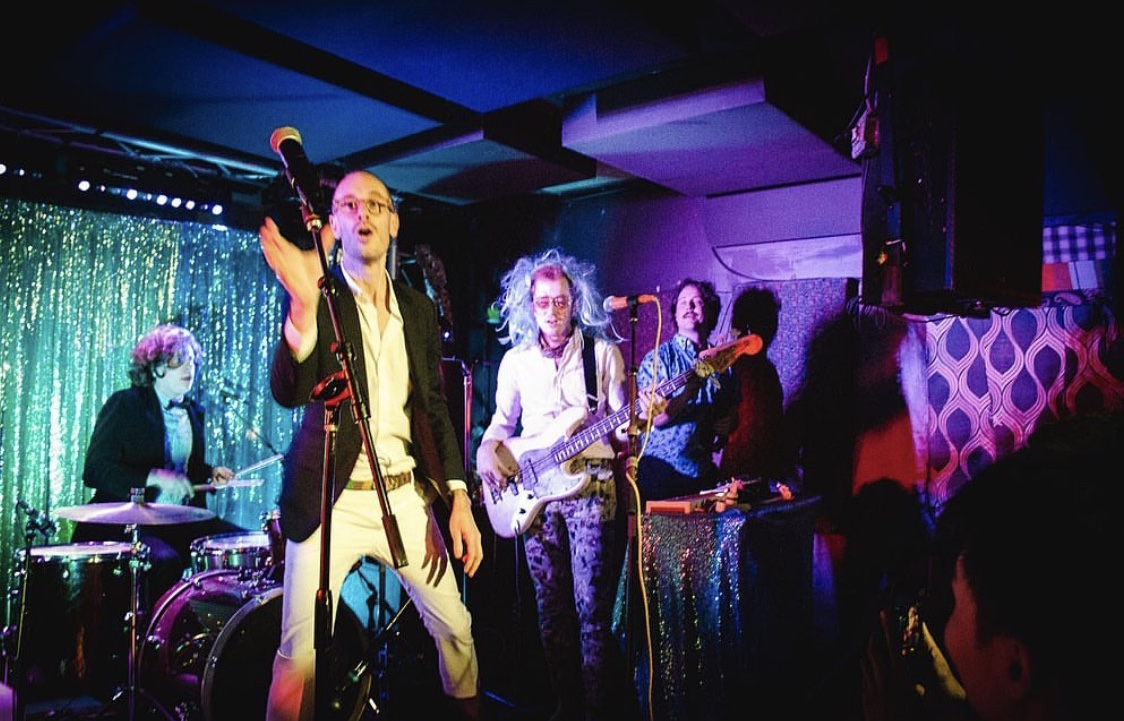
- Hellogoodbye during 2019 World Tour

Background information
- Origin: Huntington Beach, California
- Genres: Indie pop; power pop; pop punk; emo pop
- Years active: 2001–present
- Labels: Drive-Thru; Wasted Summer; LAB; Old Friends
- Members: Forrest Kline; Jesse Kurvink; Augustine Rampolla; Eric Hehr; Michael Nielsen
- Past members: Parker Case; Chris Profeta; Marcus Cole; Simon Poulton; Jesse Kurvink; Paul Michael White Jr. Joseph Marro; Ryan Daly; Aaron Flora; Michael Nielsen; Travis Head; Michael Garzon; Andrew Richards

Hellogoodbye (sometimes styled as hellogoodbye) is an American pop rock band that was formed in Huntington Beach, California in 2001 by singer Forrest Kline. They were signed to Drive-Thru Records and released their first full-length album Zombies! Aliens! Vampires! Dinosaurs! in 2006, having previously released the EP Hellogoodbye in 2004, and DVD OMG HGB DVD ROTFL in 2005. In 2010, the band released Would It Kill You? on their label Wasted Summer Records. The album was released in the United Kingdom and Europe by LAB Records on March 14, 2011. Hellogoodbye released their third album, Everything Is Debatable, on October 29, 2013, while touring as the opening act for Paramore's The Self-Titled Tour. Their fourth album, S'Only Natural, was released on October 5, 2018.

Kerrang! described the band's sound as power pop. The publication also called them a "Myspace band" due to their popularity on Myspace early in their career. The band is associated with the scene subculture.

== History ==
=== Early career (2001–2005) ===
Hellogoodbye started in 2001 as a recording project by Huntington Beach High School students Forrest Kline and Jesse Kurvink. With the interest only to entertain friends and woo crushes, Kline and Kurvink recorded some songs on Forrest's home computer. The first Hellogoodbye song ever written was Kurvink's "Bonnie Taylor Shakedown 2K1" which later appeared on their debut self-titled EP. With Kline's interest in web and graphic design, the unofficial group got a working title and a website and posted songs on MP3.com. As interest in the music grew, Kline recruited friends and chanced upon some opening slots at local shows.

In their first two years the group played local shows in Orange County at venues such as the Chain Reaction (Anaheim, California), The Hub (Fullerton, California), and Koo's Cafe (Long Beach, California), made a few trips to play in Arizona, and did one mini-tour through Arizona, New Mexico, and Texas with the band Peachcake. During this time they kept busy burning demos, screen printing tee-shirts and promoting via their website before signing to Drive-Thru Records in 2003.

After signing in 2003 Hellogoodbye released a self-titled EP on August 17, 2004, which has sold over 400,000 copies to date. The band began touring vigorously in support of this release in the United States and abroad. During the "Sounds of Change Tour" with An Angle, Socratic, and Steel Train, Hellogoodbye flipped and totaled their van and trailer after Cole dozed off behind the wheel while driving through Pennsylvania on October 22, 2004. None of the band's members were injured.

While participating in the 2005 South by Southwest (SXSW) music festival in Austin, Texas, the band appeared on several episodes of MTV's The Real World: Austin. The cast of the TV series produced a video documentary about three bands on the festival's line-up (the other two were Halifax and Enon), including interviews and live footage. The appearance gave a boost to the band's popularity.

On November 22, 2005 Hellogoodbye released a DVD titled OMG HGB DVD ROTFL. It featured two hours of concert and touring footage, as well as music videos to the five songs off their debut EP. Following the release, the group was featured on the third and fourth installments of the Drive-Thru Records DVD series. In December 2005, the band won MTV2's Dew Circuit Breakout competition.

=== Zombies! Aliens! Vampires! Dinosaurs! (2006–2008) ===
On August 8, 2006, after two years of touring, Hellogoodbye released its first full-length record, Zombies! Aliens! Vampires! Dinosaurs! produced by Matt Mahaffey through Drive-Thru Records. In 2006, Hellogoodbye appeared on the Vans Warped Tour, did a full headlining tour with Reggie and the Full Effect, Cute Is What We Aim For, Ozma and Peachcake, visited the United Kingdom (with The Plain White T's), Japan, and Europe. In 2007, they continued touring, doing a headlining tour with Boys Like Girls, a tour of Australia with Australian band The Lucksmiths, played the main stage of The Bamboozle in New Jersey, headlined the side stage at Give It a Name, played the Reading and Leeds Festivals in the United Kingdom as well as fellow European festivals Pukklelpop, Rock en Seine, and the MySpace Music Tour (co-headlining with Say Anything).

In the January 2007 issue of Alternative Press, the group confirmed their new album would be released 2008. In January 2007, the single "Here (In Your Arms)" saw a resurgence on Top 40 radio and entered the Billboard Hot 100 (peaking at No. 14) and the Pop 100 (peaking at No. 9). The song was certified platinum in the United States. Globally, "Here (In Your Arms)" peaked within the top ten of the charts in the Ireland, the Netherlands, Sweden, and the United Kingdom. The song saw its biggest success in the former country, where it peaked at number two on the Irish Singles Chart in May 2007. In the same month, they also appeared on The Late Late Show with Craig Ferguson, The Tonight Show with Jay Leno, and Last Call with Carson Daly. Their song "Oh, It Is Love" became the theme song on MTV's Engaged and Underage. On March 13, 2007 they released an iTunes exclusive three-song EP, which featured three different remixes of the song "All of Your Love". A few months later that year, the MTV movie Super Sweet 16 aired on television, featuring a live performance by Hellogoodbye of their song "All of Your Love".

In September 2008, it was announced that keyboardist Jesse Kurvink would be leaving the band to finish college. Replacing him would be Joe Marro, former guitarist/keyboardist of The Early November. In addition to the lineup changes, the band has announced a fall tour throughout the United States. Accompanying them on the tour are Never Shout Never, Say No More, Ace Enders, and PlayRadioPlay!. In October 2008, it was announced on Hellogoodbye's blog that drummer Chris Profeta would be leaving the band, and will be replaced by former Hellogoodbye drummer Aaron Flora.

=== Would It Kill You? (2009–2012) ===
On various websites during 2009 and 2010, including their own, Hellogoodbye stated they were working on a new record. The name of the album was revealed to be Would It Kill You?. The band paired up to tour with Hanson, starting on September 30 in Tulsa followed by dates in October and early November on what was called the Use Your Sole Tour. Other bands which partook in the tour were Steel Train and Sherwood. On August 5, 2009, Hellogoodbye did a live stream of their new song "When We First Met" on absolutepunk.net.

Hellogoodbye was selected to perform at Boston's notorious CollegeFest event on September 26, 2009.

In late 2009, the band began to post new covers on their website, including a version of "Happy Xmas (War Is Over)" (originally by John Lennon) and "Do You Want to Know a Secret" (originally by The Beatles). Kline then said that some of the covers will be of '90s emo and mid '80s punk.

In early 2010, they went on tour with New Found Glory, Saves the Day, and Fireworks.

According to their Twitter on February 25, 2010, they officially parted ways with Drive-Thru Records. This ended an over year-long lawsuit with the label which hindered a new album release which had already been written and recorded. Future releases will now be through their own label, Wasted Summer. The band also began running their own online merchandise store. The new merchandise also features some homemade items from family and friends.

A track from Hellogoodbye's second album Would It Kill You? was announced via their website, and was revealed to be called "Getting Old". At a concert on September 10, 2010 Hellogoodbye performed two new tracks entitled "Coppertone" and "When We First Kissed". Would It Kill You? was released on November 9, 2010.

On the Vans Warped Tour 2011, Hellogoodbye was filmed by Chris Skiles and interviewed by Juliet Simms. Forrest spoke about being a vegan on tour for Buzznet's Incredibly Green on the Go segment.

Would It Kill You? was released on March 14, 2011 in the United Kingdom and European Union by LAB Records.

On January 25, 2012, it was announced that Joe Marro was leaving the band. He cited his recent marriage and touring pressures as the reason for the split. He was replaced by Augie Rampolla (ex-You, Me, and Everyone We Know guitarist).

In 2012, it was announced that Hellogoodbye, after touring, would be recording their third LP. In July and August, the group went on a tour of the US with Relient K, William Beckett and House of Heroes.

On November 14, 2012 it was announced that Hellogoodbye had signed with Old Friends Records, a sister label to Fearless Records, to re-release Would It Kill You? and record a third LP.

=== Did It Kill You? and Touring (2013) ===
In March 2013, Hellogoodbye released a live album, Did it Kill You?, recorded at a house party in December 2012. The album was available through the band's Facebook page via a share-to-download format. Did it Kill You? features several tracks from the band's second LP, an original Christmas song written by Forrest, and a cover of the Beach Boys' hit, "Barbara Ann".

Starting on April 24, 2013, Hellogoodbye embarked on a spring tour with Relient K and William Beckett.

=== Everything Is Debatable and S'Only Natural (2013–present) ===
In August 2013, Hellogoodbye stated they would release their third studio album Everything Is Debatable. The album was released on October 29, 2013. In October 2013, Hellogoodbye was the opening act for Paramore's The Self-Titled Tour with Metric.

On January 13, 2015, the band released the single "I Wanna See the States" for a promotion for PBS Learning Media's geography lessons. In January 2017, Forrest Kline teased that a new track would be released on behalf of a charity donated to the ACLU, and revealed the title hours later as "Stare into the Black", before posting it on the band's online store for sale. Forrest posted the song to the band's YouTube account shortly after, and confirmed a new album was in the works on Hellogoodbye's Facebook account, stating "[Stare Into The Black] was intended for it... and will likely still be included."

On August 2, 2017, the band announced the "Would Zombies! Aliens! Vampires! Dinosaurs! Kill You?" Tour, a six date tour during which they played the first two albums in whole, as well as select other songs.

On July 22, 2018, Hellogoodbye announced via their official Facebook page that their new album S'Only Natural will be released on October 5, 2018.

In late 2021, Hellogoodbye embarked on a US and UK tour celebrating the 10-year anniversary of their second LP, Would It Kill You? They played the album in its entirety along with additional hits from their catalog.

== Band members ==
Current

- Forrest Kline – lead vocals, guitar, ukulele (2001–present)
- Jesse Kurvink – keyboards, backing vocals, guitar (2001–2008, 2025–present)
- Michael Nielsen – drums (2010–present)
- Augustine Rampolla – keyboards, guitar, bass, ukulele, percussion, backing vocals (2011–present)
- Eric Hehr – guitar, keyboards (2016–present)

Former

- Parker Case – drums (2001)
- Paul White – bass guitar (2001)
- Marcus Cole – bass guitar, keyboards, percussion (2002–2007)
- Joseph Marro – keyboards, guitar (2008–2012)
- Travis Head – bass guitar (2007–2011)
- Aaron Flora – drums (2001–2003, 2008–2010, 2012)
- Chris Profeta – drums, percussion (2003–2008)
- Ryan Daly – guitar (2007–2009)
- Andrew Richards – guitar, ukulele, mandolin (2008–2018)
- Michael Garzon – drums, guitar, backing vocals, mandolin, ukulele, keyboards (2011–2018)

== Discography ==
=== Studio albums ===
List of studio albums, with selected chart positions
Title	Details	Peak chart positions								Sales
Title	Details	US	US Alt.	US Indie	US Rock	CAN	IRL	SCO	UK	Sales
Zombies! Aliens! Vampires! Dinosaurs!	Release date: August 8, 2006; Label: Drive-Thru	13	—	1	4	56	83	13	17	US: 150,000
Would It Kill You?	Release date: November 9, 2010; Label: Wasted Summer	104	12	12	22	—	—	—	—	
Everything Is Debatable	Release date: October 29, 2013; Label: Old Friends	148	—	27	43	—	—	—	—	
S'Only Natural	Release date: October 5, 2018; Label: Wasted Summer	—	—	—	—	—	—	—	—	
"—" denotes album that did not chart or was not released in that territory.

=== Extended plays ===
List of extended plays, with selected chart positions and sales figures
Title	Album details	Peak chart positions		Sales
Title	Album details	US Heat	CAN	Sales
Hellogoodbye	Released: August 17, 2004; Label: Drive-Thru; Formats: CD, digital download	31	—	US: 80,000
Remixes	Released: November 7, 2006; Label: Drive-Thru; Formats: Digital download	—	—	
All of Your Love Remixes	Released: March 13, 2007; Label: Drive-Thru; Formats: Digital download	—	—	
Ukulele Recordings	Released: November 16, 2008; Label: Drive-Thru; Formats: Digital download	—	36	
When We First Met	Released: September 29, 2009; Label: Self-released; Formats: Digital download, vinyl	—	—	
"—" denotes a release that did not chart.

=== DVDs ===
- OMG HGB DVD ROTFL (2005)
- EP/DVD Split (2008)
- Zombies! Aliens! Vampires! Dinosaurs! And More (2008)

=== Singles ===
List of singles, with selected chart positions and certifications, showing year released and album name
Title	Year	Peak chart positions										Certifications	Album
Title	Year	US	CAN	GER	IRL	NL	SCO	SWE	SWI	UK	UKR	Certifications	Album
"Shimmy Shimmy Quarter Turn"	2005	—	—	—	—	—	—	—	—	—	—		Hellogoodbye
"Call N' Return (Say That You're Into Me)"	2005	—	—	—	—	—	—	—	—	—	—		Hellogoodbye
"Bonnie Taylor Shakedown 2K1"	2005	—	—	—	—	—	—	—	—	—			Hellogoodbye
"Jesse Buy Nothing... Go to Prom Anyways"	2005	—	—	—	—	—	—	—	—	—	—		Hellogoodbye
"Dear Jamie... Sincerely Me"	2005	—	—	—	—	—	—	—	—	—	—		Hellogoodbye
"Here (In Your Arms)"	2006	14	11	84	2	10	2	10	55	4	39	RIAA: Platinum; BPI: Silver	Zombies! Aliens! Vampires! Dinosaurs!
"All of Your Love"	2007	—	—	—	—	—	—	—	—	—	—		Zombies! Aliens! Vampires! Dinosaurs!
"Baby, It's Fact"	2007	—	—	—	—	—	60	—	— (Note: "Baby, It's Fact" did not enter the Swiss Singles chart, but charted at number 84 on the Swiss Airplay chart.)	81	120		Zombies! Aliens! Vampires! Dinosaurs!
"The Thoughts That Give Me the Creeps"	2008	— (Note: "The Thoughts That Give Me the Creeps" did not enter the Billboard Hot 100, but peaked at number 36 on the Hot Singles Sales chart.)	—	—	—	—	—	—	—	—	—		Would It Kill You?
"When We First Met"	2009	—	—	—	—	—	—	—	—	—	—		Would It Kill You?
"(Everything Is) Debatable"	2013	—	—	—	—	—	—	—	—	—	—		Everything Is Debatable
"I Wanna See the States"	2015	—	—	—	—	—	—	—	—	—	—		Non-album single
"Stare into the Black"	2017	—	—	—	—	—	—	—	—	—	—		S'Only Natural
"S'Only Natural"	2018	—	—	—	—	—	—	—	—	—	—		S'Only Natural
"Honeymoon (Forever)"	2018	—	—	—	—	—	—	—	—	—	—		S'Only Natural
"Let It Burn"	2018	—	—	—	—	—	—	—	—	—	—		S'Only Natural
"Mysterious You"	2018	—	—	—	—	—	—	—	—	—	—		S'Only Natural
"Close"	2018	—	—	—	—	—	—	—	—	—	—		S'Only Natural
"I'll Keep on Following You"	2018	—	—	—	—	—	—	—	—	—	—		S'Only Natural
"Put It Out"	2018	—	—	—	—	—	—	—	—	—	—		S'Only Natural
"Here in Yr Arms 2 Back in Yr Arms"	2018	—	—	—	—	—	—	—	—	—	—		Non-album singles
"Needy Lover"	2019	—	—	—	—	—	—	—	—	—	—		Non-album singles
"A Reminder to Me"	2020	—	—	—	—	—	—	—	—	—	—		Would It Kill You? 10 Year Anniversary
"God Only Knows"	2020	—	—	—	—	—	—	—	—	—	—		Non-album singles
"Stop Acting Like You Know More About the Internet Cafe Than Me"	2022	—	—	—	—	—	—	—	—	—	—		Non-album singles
"—" denotes releases that did not chart or was not released in that territory.

=== Non-album tracks ===
- "Winter Wonderland" – released on Happy Holidays from Drive-Thru Records (2004)
- "Weird Science" – released on Dead Bands Party: A Tribute to Oingo Boingo (2005)
- "Asking Jessica to Be Official" (ft. Ryan Wilson)
- "Jessie Buy Corsage"
- "Oh Angie"
- "If You Wanna...I Might"
- "Oh Karissa How I Miss Ya"
- "Lindsay Pai Ala Mode (I Just Think She's the Best)"
- "Welcome to the Record"
- "Trevor Roolz (A Lot)"
- "Two Gay German Clubbers Who Are in a Club"
- "Secret Song aka Ethan's Song"
- "One-Armed Scissor", which is actually a phone message Forrest received and turned into a song.
- "All Time Lows" — released on Music from Degrassi: The Next Generation (2008)

=== Covers ===
- "What's My Age Again?" – Blink-182
- "Dammit" – Blink-182
- "All the Small Things" – Blink-182
- "Do You Want to Know a Secret" – The Beatles
- "Happy Xmas (War Is Over)" – John Lennon
- "Escape" – Enrique Iglesias
- "Everyday" – Buddy Holly
- "Fly Me to the Moon" – Frank Sinatra
- "Little Miss Blue" – Dion and the Belmonts
- "Halloween" – Misfits
- "A Picture Postcard" - The Promise Ring
- "Barbara Ann" - The Beach Boys
