= David Reilly =

American singer-songwriter

David Fitzgerald Reilly (May 5, 1971 – October 16, 2005) was the American singer and songwriting/production partner in the electronic rock band God Lives Underwater (GLU), signed by Rick Rubin to American Recordings in 1993.

== Life and career ==
American released God Lives Underwater's first release, a self-titled EP called GLU, and their debut album Empty, which spawned minor radio hits "No More Love" (which also appeared on the soundtrack to Johnny Mnemonic). The band broke up after releasing a total of three albums.

Reilly then moved on to solo work and other projects. With God Lives Underwater bandmember Jeff Turzo, he produced and remixed for Skinny Puppy, Rob Zombie, and Messiah, and organized and contributed to 1998's For the Masses, a tribute album to Depeche Mode.

In 2001, Reilly released a solo album consisting of four untitled instrumental tracks under the band name Robot Teen America, titled Living in Syn. This album was dedicated to David Reilly's girlfriend, Monica Young, whose nickname was "Seven." She was struck and killed by a train in November 2000. As a result, he released 77 CDs: 70 to fans and six to friends and one to himself. Each CD was numbered and signed by Reilly and only available through the Internet. In 2002, Reilly started the rock band Fluzee, who released one album titled 7 before breaking up the following year.

June 2004 saw the release of God Lives Underwater's Up Off the Floor, on Megaforce/Locomotive. Reilly also embarked on a short solo acoustic tour, supported by drummer Benjamin Juul and guitarist David Trusso, in support of his EP Inside, which was not released until the end of the tour.

In 2005, before his death, Reilly signed to Sony Music/RuffNation Records, and would have released his debut solo album How Humans R(x) in 2006.

2005 was to see Reilly's return to touring in support of the unreleased How Humans R(x) album, as well as new material centered around the death of his fiancée with former Spiritualized guitar player Gregg Hale, but Reilly died unexpectedly on October 16, 2005, from complications of a coma brought on by pain medication for an abscessed tooth. Tour dates were scheduled at the time of his death, and the album was left unfinished, not to be released until December, 2009, with only 100 physical copies of the album being printed and sold exclusively online. Reilly was buried in Holy Sepulchre Cemetery in Cheltenham, Pennsylvania.

A digital box set (42 tracks) of hard-to-find solo tracks & high-school band demos was released to iTunes in October, 2013 titled David Reilly - Life After The So Called God Lives Underwater Age.

A book about David Reilly and God Lives Underwater was released on October 16, 2007, by Brian Paone, titled Dreams Are Unfinished Thoughts. The official God lives Underwater / David Reilly posthumous website was launched in April, 2014 containing as much music and videos and interviews that could be compiled.

== Discography ==
=== with God Lives Underwater ===
- 1995 – God Lives Underwater (GLU)
- 1995 – Empty
- 1998 – Life in the So-Called Space Age
- 2004 – Up Off The Floor

=== with Fluzee ===
- 2002 – The 7 EP

=== Solo work ===
- 2001 – Living in Syn (as Robot Teen America)
- 2004 – Inside
- 2009 – How Humans R(x)
- 2013 – Life After the So-Called God Lives Underwater Age
