= Jeff Turzo =

- Genres: Industrial rock, electronic rock, techno, industrial metal, alternative metal
- Occupations: Musician, songwriter
- Years active: 1993–present
- Labels: Onion/American, 1500/A&M, Locomotive

Jeff Turzo, as singer/programming and songwriting/production partner in the electronic rock band God Lives Underwater (GLU), spent the better part of the 1990s as a producer and touring artist, first signed by Rick Rubin to American Recordings in 1993.

American went on to release GLU's self-titled EP and debut album Empty, which spawned minor radio hits "No More Love" and "All Wrong", the former as a single from the soundtrack to the hit Keanu Reeves film Johnny Mnemonic.

GLU then made a move to 1500 /A&M, who went on to release their second full-length Life in the So-Called Space Age, which generated the hit, "From Your Mouth". The single enjoyed play on alternative rock stations and MTV alike, and saw the band hitting the road for several years of mostly sold-out shows alongside notable artists including KMFDM, Korn, Stabbing Westward, Life of Agony, Filter, Far, Type O Negative, Genitorturers, Deftones, No Doubt, and Sublime.

In addition to his repertoire as a writer and programmer, Turzo was a multi-instrumentalist and producer with synthesis/sampling knowledge, and with his GLU partner David Reilly stayed busy with other production and remix projects as well, including remixes for Skinny Puppy, Rob Zombie and Messiah, and organizing and contributing to 1998's For the Masses, a tribute album to Depeche Mode.

2004 saw the release of GLU's Up Off the Floor, released worldwide in June on Megaforce/Locomotive.

Turzo later founded Overstayer Recording Equipment, Inc. which manufactures analog audio processing gear for recording studios and musicians. The company is based in Los Angeles, California.

== Labels ==
- American Recordings
- Elektra Records
- N2O Records

== Releases ==
- Mass Hystereo (1997)
- Wired All Wrong (2006)

== Filmography ==
Rushing Jason – 2008
