= The Mother, the Mechanic, and the Path =

Studio album by The Early November
- Released: July 11, 2006
- Recorded: February 28, 2005 – March 2006
- Studio: Portrait Recording, Pompton Plains, New Jersey
- Genre: Emo, indie rock, acoustic
- Length: 132:16
- Label: Drive-Thru
- Producer: Ace Enders, Chris Badami

The Early November chronology
The Early November / I Am the Avalanche (2005)	The Mother, the Mechanic, and the Path (2006)	In Currents (2012)

Singles from The Mother, the Mechanic, and the Path
- 1. "Decoration" Released: April 19, 2005; 2. "Hair" Released: April 18, 2006

Professional ratings
Review scores
Source	Rating
AbsolutePunk.net	(83%) link
Allmusic	link

The Mother, the Mechanic, and the Path is the second studio album by The Early November. The triple disc concept album was released on July 11, 2006, via Drive-Thru Records.

== Production ==
The recording of the album began on February 28, 2005, and took over a year until its completion due to the nature of a triple disc record, stress, Enders changing the concept of the story several times mid-record, and ultimately the lack of focus which led to a mid-recording nervous breakdown. This forced the album's release to be postponed from its original June 2005 street date to July 2006. The third disc, The Path, was written by Enders and Jeff Kummer, and co-produced by Enders. According to an interview with Enders on Episode 17 of the Voice & Verse Podcast, there were multiple versions of the story that were recorded and considered. Though the first version to be submitted to Drive-Thru Records was not immediately accepted, the label was supportive and asked that some changes and additional work be done. In the end, it was Enders and those artistically involved with writing and presenting the story who ultimately re-worked the story and its presentation multiple times before it became the final product, despite rumors that Drive-Thru Records had turned down the story seven times for quality control issues before finally approving it. Enders also did the artwork for The Mother, the Mechanic and the Path, drawing up a father in a mechanics uniform named Matt, a mother and a son named Dean, for the cover and booklet.

Recording took place at Portrait Recording Studios in Pompton Plains, New Jersey, with Enders and Chris Badami producing the sessions. Badami also mixed and engineered the recordings. He was assisted by Michelle Dispenziere and Paul Spinella. Several people contributed to the recordings: David Rimelis (string and horn arrangements, nylon guitar and banjo), Arthur Fiacco (cello), Elizabeth Hostetter (viola), Andrea Schultz (violin), Angela Cordell (French horn), Richard Dispenziere (trumpet), Peter McGuinness (trombone), Kenny Sorenson (harmonica), Brian O'Neal (Roark) and Lynsie Crespo (background vocals), and Badami (piano and percussion). George Marino mastered The Mechanic disc and Greg Calbi mastered The Mother disc, both at Sterling Sound in New York City. Badami mastered The Path disc at Portrait Recording Studio.

== Music and lyrical content ==
The concept album is broken down into three chapters:

- The Mechanic – the proclaimed "rock" disc of the album, showcasing the heavier side of the band. According to singer/guitarist Ace Enders, The Mechanic is the group's "safe bet", the album they would have made if it had only been one disc. It represents the technical progression from its predecessor The Room's Too Cold (2003), hence the title.
- The Mother – a mostly unplugged effort in the vein of The Early November's The Acoustic EP (2003) and Enders' solo CD I Can Make a Mess Like Nobody's Business (2004). The disc focuses on the band's mellow facet, featuring a more natural sound, conveyed by the use of predominantly acoustic instruments and few effects or filters.
- The Path – an audio theatre of sorts, which mixes dialogue between a young man named Dean and his psychiatrist with soft background music. The psychiatry sessions that narrate the story are interrupted by short "musical"-esque songs, also introducing the interaction of other characters. The songs cover a wide range of musical genres, including blues, country and folk.

== Release ==
On May 1, 2005, the Early November's next album was announced for release in October that year. They band released a split single with I Am the Avalanche that featured a demo of "Outside" and a live version of "Ever So Sweet". Between October and December 2005, the Early November supported Saves the Day and Senses Fail on their co-headlining US tour. An EP, dubbed Selections from the Forthcoming Triple Album, was posted on Downloadpunk.com in March 2006; it featured "Decoration", "Hair", "The One That You Hated", and a live video of "Sesame Shmesame". In March and April 2006, the band supported Matchbook Romance and Silverstein on the Take Action Tour. On April 15, 2006, The Mother, the Mechanic, and the Path was announced for release in three months' time. "A Little More Time" was premiered through AbsolutePunk on May 30, 2006. On June 7, 2006, "Drive South" premiered through Fuse's website. The Mother, the Mechanic, and the Path was made available for streaming on July 2, 2006, before being released nine days later through Drive-Thru Records. During the first weeks of sales, purchases of The Mother, the Mechanic, and the Path from Best Buy were accompanied by a bonus DVD (containing the music video to "Hair" and a 35-minute making-of documentary), while Target customers were rewarded with an exclusive bonus track.

In mid-September, the band went on a UK tour alongside the Starting Line and Anberlin. In October and November 2006, the band supported New Found Glory on their headlining US tour. The music video for "Decoration" was posted online on October 31, 2006. They supported Fall Out Boy on their headlining US tour in January 2007. On March 13, 2007, the band announced they would be going on an indefinite hiatus following their touring engagements. In March and April 2007, they went on a headlining US tour with support from the Rocket Summer, Mêlée, and the Verdict. Following this, the band appeared at The Bamboozle festival.

As of January 2007, the band has sold 78,669 copies of The Mother, the Mechanic, and the Path. In May 2014, the album was released on vinyl through TDR Records.

== Track listing ==
All songs written by Ace Enders.

The Mechanic (disc one)

1. "Money in His Hand" – 3:39
2. "The Rest of My Life" – 2:37
3. "Decoration" – 3:17
4. "No Good at Saying Sorry (One More Chance)" – 3:41
5. "This Wasn't in Our Plan" – 4:02
6. "The One That You Hated" – 3:51
7. "Long Talks" – 3:57
8. "Outside" – 4:03
9. "Make a Decision" – 3:47
10. "The Car in 20" – 3:42
11. "Figure It Out" – 4:40

Total length – 41:20

The Mother (disc two)

1. "My Lack of Skill" – 3:27
2. "A Little More Time" – 3:22
3. "Little Black Heart" – 3:56
4. "Hair" – 3:02
5. "Driving South" – 3:17
6. "Scared to Lose" – 3:13
7. "From Here to L.A." – 3:13
8. "Is It My Fault" – 3:59
9. "I Don't Know How to Say This" – 3:07
10. "The Truth Is" – 4:34
11. "1000 Times a Day" – 5:39

Total length – 40:54

The Path (disc three)

1. "Intro" – 2:15
2. "We Grew Up the Same" – 4:25
3. "Runaway" – 3:41
4. "Session 01" – 2:36
5. "This Is Love" – 1:15
6. "Session 02" – 0:39
7. "We're Finding Something Out" – 1:30
8. "Session 03" – 1:12
9. "Decoration" – 1:29
10. "Session 04" – 1:15
11. "Uncle" – 0:43
12. "Session 05" – 1:40
13. "Never Coming Back" – 3:02
14. "Guess What" – 1:09
15. "Session 06" – 0:20
16. "You Don't Know What It's Like" – 1:34
17. "Session 07" – 1:56
18. "Look at Me" – 1:57
19. "Session 08" – 3:02
20. "Session 08 Part II" – 2:18
21. "Runaway II" – 3:42
22. "Session 09" – 0:53
23. "I Think This Is Love" – 1:05
24. "A Bigger Meaning" – 6:12

Total length – 50:01

- "No Good at Saying Sorry" has been rereleased under Ace Enders' side project, I Can Make a Mess Like Nobody's Business, album titled "Dust'n Off The Ol' Guitar"

== Personnel ==
Personnel per booklet.

The Early November

- Ace Enders – vocals, guitar
- Sergio Anello – bass
- Joseph Marro – guitar, keyboards
- Bill Lugg – guitar
- Jeff Kummer – drums

Additional musicians

- David Rimelis – string and horn arrangements, nylon guitar, banjo
- Arthur Fiacco – cello
- Elizabeth Hostetter – viola
- Andrea Schultz – violin
- Angela Cordell – French horn
- Richard Dispenziere – trumpet
- Peter McGuinness – trombone
- Kenny Sorenson – harmonica
- Brian O'Neal (Roark) – background vocals
- Lynsie Crespo – background vocals
- Chris Badami – piano, percussion

Production

- Ace Enders – producer, art direction, sketches
- Chris Badami – producer, mixing, engineer, mastering (The Path)
- Michelle Dispenziere – assistant engineer
- Paul Spinella – assistant engineer
- George Marino – mastering (The Mechanic)
- Greg Calbi – mastering (The Mother)
- Kelly Scott Orr – design
- Rob Gary – layout
