= Pete Nischt =

American singer-songwriter and guitarist (born 1986)

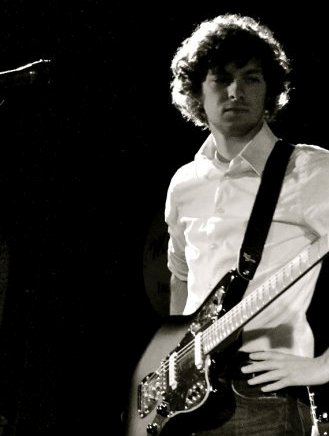
- Pete Nischt in Akron, Ohio 2010

Background information
- Born: Peter Walter Nischt; October 15, 1986 (age 39)
- Origin: Akron, Ohio, United States
- Genres: Singer-songwriter, folk rock, baroque pop, alternative
- Instruments: Vocals, guitar, trumpet, melodica, harmonica
- Years active: 2003–present
- Labels: Currently Independent; Formerly signed to Regular Music
- Website: www.ourstage.com/profile/petenischt www.myspace.com/petenischt

Pete Nischt (born Peter W. Nischt on October 15, 1986, in Ohio) is an American singer-songwriter and guitarist currently residing in Akron, Ohio. His music ranges from folk rock and pop rock to baroque pop and alt-country. He cites his biggest influences as Ryan Adams and the Red House Painters.

== History ==
Pete Nischt grew up in Medina, Ohio and attended Highland High School (Medina, Ohio) where he stood out as a musician on the trumpet and guitar. After briefly considering a major in Jazz Studies on the trumpet after high school, he relocated to Akron, Ohio in 2005 to attend the University of Akron, study Accounting, and concentrate on songwriting. He played his first solo show in August 2005 at an open-mic night. Over the next year, he made a name for himself playing with childhood friend Kate Voegele and others around Ohio and the Midwest. In January 2006, Pete was discovered by Ace Enders (The Early November, I Can Make a Mess Like Nobody's Business, Ace Enders and a Million Different People) at a show. Shortly afterwards, Enders, along with his wife Jenn and bandmate Jeff Kummer, started a record label called Regular Music. Pete was the first artist signed to the label and did not return to school the following year, leaving behind scholarship money, and a 3.8 grade point average. The label rereleased an acoustic EP of Pete's, entitled Sandbox: The Free EP, and later released his full-length debut, Life is Strange (produced by Chris Badami). Life is Strange was a very eclectic CD, encompassing several genres of music, and highlighting Pete's talent for songwriting. The debut was well received and sold briefly across North America and Europe. Pete toured for the label until shortly after the release of Life is Strange. He then returned to school in August 2007 after trouble developed with Regular Music. Although Pete kept a fairly regular touring schedule around the midwest and east coast after they parted, both sides kept quiet about the incident.

== Touring ==
From 2005 to the present, Pete has shared the stage with many artists on national tours, regional tours, and one-off shows including Blessid Union of Souls, Kate Voegele, The Verve Pipe, Ace Enders and a Million Different People, Paper Rival, Augustana, Roark, Richard Julian of The Little Willies and many others. A 2007 fall tour with The Early November and Steel Train was also scheduled, but was later canceled due to problems within The Early November, who broke up shortly thereafter.

== Current projects ==
Pete is reported to be in the middle of recording a follow-up to his 2007 full-length with his band under the name "Pete Nischt and the Motions." The record is being co-produced by Motions guitar player, Rob Parr (As Tall As Lions and The Dear Hunter), Nischt and their keys player, Andy Dolson.

In August 2012, Pete also released a seven-song EP that he recorded alone entitled American Love. The EP was released digitally via Pete's profile on NoiseTrade.com.

== Education ==
Pete has noted several times in interviews his dedication to education. He received his undergraduate degree in International Business at the University of Akron, and also took classes at the Berklee College of Music in Boston and the Xavier Institute of Management and Entrepreneurship in Bangalore, India while pursuing his undergraduate degree. In 2008 he was one of 25 admitted into New York University’s Clive Davis Department of Recorded Music, but had to turn down his acceptance due to the high cost of attending the school and living in Manhattan. He is currently pursuing a Juris Doctor degree at the University of Akron School of Law while continuing to perform and release records.

== Discography ==
- Sandbox: The Free EP (August 2006)
- Life is Strange (August 14, 2007)
- Sandbox: The Free EP (Digital rerelease including b-sides) (July 20, 2010)
- Life is Strange (Digital Rerelease) (August 17, 2010)
- American Love (August 31, 2012)

== Elections ==
In November 2015, Pete lost election to an unexpired seat on the Akron Municipal Schoolboard.
