= Hold On (All That Remains song) =

Single by All That Remains

from the album For We Are Many
- Released: September 14, 2010
- Recorded: 2010
- Genre: Melodic metalcore
- Length: 2:57
- Label: Prosthetic; Razor & Tie
- Songwriters: Philip Labonte; Oli Herbert; Mike Martin; Jeanne Sagan; Jason Costa
- Producers: Adam Dutkiewicz; Rob Graves

All That Remains singles chronology
"Forever in Your Hands" (2009)	"Hold On" (2010)	"The Last Time" (2011)

"Hold On" is a song by American heavy metal band All That Remains. The song was released as the lead single from the band's fifth studio album For We Are Many in September 2010.

== Music video ==
The song's music video was released on the band's official YouTube page on October 8, 2010. The video was directed by Ramon Boutviseth.

== Track listing ==
No.	Title	Length
1.	"Hold On" (Radio Version)	3:08

== Charts ==
Chart (2010)	Peak position
US Hot Rock & Alternative Songs (Billboard)	27
US Mainstream Rock (Billboard)	10

== Personnel ==
- Philip Labonte – vocals
- Oli Herbert – lead guitar
- Mike Martin – rhythm guitar
- Jeanne Sagan – bass guitar
- Jason Costa – drums
