= The Last Time (All That Remains song) =

Single by All That Remains

from the album For We Are Many
- Released: April 1, 2011
- Recorded: 2010
- Genre: Melodic metalcore
- Length: 3:58
- Label: Prosthetic & Razor & Tie
- Songwriters: Jason Costa, Rob Graves, Oli Herbert, Philip Labonte, Mike Martin
- Producers: Adam Dutkiewicz & Rob Graves

All That Remains singles chronology
"Hold On" (2010)	"The Last Time" (2011)	"The Waiting One" (2011)

"The Last Time" is a song by American heavy metal band All That Remains. The song was released as a single from their fifth album, For We Are Many, on April 1, 2011, and a music video was released to YouTube on April 1, 2011. In the U.S., it peaked at number eight on the Mainstream Rock chart and at number 25 on the Alternative chart.

== Track listing ==
No.	Title	Length
1.	"The Last Time" (Radio edit)	3:58

== Charts ==
Chart (2011)	Peak position
US Hot Rock & Alternative Songs (Billboard)	25
US Mainstream Rock (Billboard)	8
