= Victim of the New Disease =

Studio album by All That Remains
- Released: November 9, 2018
- Recorded: 2018
- Genre: Melodic metalcore
- Length: 39:01
- Label: Razor & Tie
- Producer: Daniel Laskiewicz

All That Remains chronology
Madness (2017)	Victim of the New Disease (2018)	Antifragile (2025)

Singles from Victim of the New Disease
- 1. "Fuck Love" Released: September 17, 2018; 2. "Everything's Wrong" Released: October 12, 2018; 3. "Wasteland" Released: October 12, 2018

Victim of the New Disease is the ninth studio album by the American heavy metal band All That Remains. It was released on November 9, 2018 on Razor & Tie Records. It is the final album to feature founding guitarist Oli Herbert, who died on October 17, 2018, less than a month prior to the album's release, and the band's final album with bassist Aaron Patrick and longtime drummer Jason Costa before their departures in 2021 and 2023, respectively. The album marks a return to the band's heavier metalcore roots. Victim of the New Disease sold over 5,300 copies in the United States in its first week of release to land at position No. 154 on Billboard 200 chart.

== Background ==
In an interview, vocalist Phil Labonte stated with the album “We decided to throw a curveball and do the heaviest record since For We Are Many in 2010. It was the perfect way to follow-up Madness, where we did some different styles and songs and even covered a country song. People might’ve expected something more experimental, but throwing curveballs is what we do.” In a separate interview, he added that the band “kind of just realized the last two records weren’t really our heaviest stuff and we just wanted to do something heavy. It was real simple, it wasn’t something that we took a lot of time contemplating."

The album was produced by Dan Laskiewicz, formerly of The Acacia Strain. The recording process was a bit of an anomaly for the group, as they finished the process within 5 months. Labonte stated "We did, like, five demos, and once we finished the demos, we were, like, 'This is really going well.' We liked the way they were turning out and we liked the way that it felt, so we decided, 'Let's just finish the record right now. The demos are good — let's just go ahead and write a few more songs, and we'll be done with it."

Labonte later revealed in an interview with Loudwire that the album’s original title was "Fuck Love", but it was shut down by their record label. The band's manager later gave Labonte the idea for a new title, Victim of the New Disease, after hearing it in a song.

== Music and lyrical themes ==
Following The Order of Things and Madness, which featured a more radio friendly sound, Victim of the New Disease saw the band return to a heavier sound along with melodic moments like their earlier work. They returned to their melodic metalcore roots infused with groove metal elements, emphasizing breakdowns, guitar solos, and stark contrasts between clean and harsh vocals.

During the production of the album, Labonte was coming off a recent divorce, which inspired many of the lyrics on the album to explore darker emotional states, along with trying to make a statement on mental health and suicide. The songs "Fuck Love," "Everything's Wrong," "Alone in the Darkness," "Just Tell Me Something" all focus on soured/flawed relationships.

The album was released shortly after the death of founding guitarist Oli Herbert, which added emotional weight to its reception. His guitar parts on this album are singled out as especially strong.

== Release and promotion ==
The first single from the album was "Fuck Love". It was first posted to lead singer Phil Labonte's Instagram page as a cryptographic binary code leading to an unlisted YouTube video. Later that month, the band revealed the album's cover and title. On October 7, guitarist Oli Herbert was found dead at his Stafford Springs home. All That Remains released a statement stating, "We were devastated to learn that Oli Herbert, our friend, guitar player, and founding member of All That Remains, has passed away. Oli was an incredibly talented guitarist and song writer who defined Rock and Metal from the Northeast. His impact on the genres and our lives will continue indefinitely." Labonte originally questioned if the band would be able to continue following Herbert's death due to him being such a big part since its inception. He then later stated that "Oli would’ve wanted the band carry on." "We’re going to go out and do as much as we can to get in front of as many people as possible and play these songs for Oli because that's what he would've wanted us to do."

Five days following his death, two more singles, "Everything’s Wrong" and "Wasteland", were released on October 12. Victim of the New Disease was officially released on November 9, 2018 and sold over 5,300 copies in the United States in its first week of release to land at position No. 154 on Billboard 200 chart. Internationally, it reached number 47 on the Australian Digital Albums chart.

Following the album's release, All That Remains supported it with a December 2018 European tour alongside Sevendust, marking their first ever tour without Herbert, with Jason Richardson being picked as his successor. The band continued support the album into 2019 with a co-headlining U.S. tour with Attila from February to April, followed by a spring headline tour featuring Unearth from May to June, and a fall co-headlining run with Lacuna Coil from September to October.

== Reception ==
Professional ratings
Review scores
Source	Rating
Exclaim!	9/10 stars
Heavy Magazine	4/5 stars
Metal Injection	9/10 stars
Grimmgent	8/10 stars
Digital Journal	4.5/5 stars
Ultimate Guitar	7.5/10 stars
Metal Hammer	3/5 stars

Victim of the New Disease has received critical acclaim from music critics, with praise being directed at a perceived return to creative and musical form as well as the return to All That Remains' heavier metalcore sound, which had largely been absent in recent material from the band in favor of a more melodic heavy metal and hard rock sound.

In a positive review for Exclaim! magazine, author Max Morin gave the album nine out of ten stars, writing "To say All That Remains are returning to their roots would oversimplify things. They have returned, but much smarter and more experienced — it's given their old formula new life. Victim of the New Disease has jerked All That Remains out of a decade long lull". In another positive review, Heavy Magazine wrote “The production is excellent and well balanced. There are lots of great riffs and enjoyable solos, all with that heavy crunch to the tone. There are just some fantastic heavy tracks that are great to get you headbanging away." Timothy Janssen of Grimmgent stated “It’s mostly heavy and it feels like a true All That Remains album.” Metal Injection gave the album a near perfect score, stating "While they’ve never totally forsaken metal on a record, it hasn’t ruled in the majority for quite a while. Until now, that is. Fans that have been begging for 'old' All That Remains can rest assured. This is what you’ve been waiting for." Similarly, Adam of Metal Hammer wrote "Victim Of The New Disease was promised to be a much heavier experience, and the band certainly deliver on the bludgeoning percussion and frantic picking of opener Fuck Love, resurrecting a sound and attitude All That Remains had seemed to have consigned to history years ago."

== Track listing ==
All lyrics are written by Phil Labonte; all music is composed by All That Remains.

No.	Title	Length
1.	"Fuck Love"	2:58
2.	"Everything's Wrong"	4:10
3.	"Blood I Spill"	3:39
4.	"Wasteland"	4:50
5.	"Alone in the Darkness"	3:29
6.	"Misery in Me"	4:10
7.	"Broken"	3:22
8.	"Just Tell Me Something" (featuring Danny Worsnop)	4:55
9.	"I Meant What I Said"	4:31
10.	"Victim of the New Disease"	2:57
Total length:		39:01

== Personnel ==
All That Remains

- Philip Labonte – lead vocals
- Oli Herbert – lead guitar
- Mike Martin – rhythm guitar
- Aaron Patrick – bass guitar, backing vocals
- Jason Costa – drums

Additional personnel

- Danny Worsnop – guest vocals on "Just Tell Me Something"
- Daniel "DL" Laskiewicz and Jim Fogarty – additional instrumentation

Production

- Daniel "DL" Laskiewicz – producer
- Jim Fogarty – engineering
- Josh Wilbur – mixing, mastering

== Charts ==
Chart (2018)	Peak position
Australian Digital Albums (ARIA)	47
US Billboard 200	154
US Top Rock Albums (Billboard)	28
US Top Hard Rock Albums (Billboard)	8
