= Everything's Wrong =

"Everything’s Wrong"

Single by All That Remains

from the album Victim of the New Disease
- Released: October 12, 2018
- Genre: Melodic metalcore
- Length: 4:10
- Label: Razor & Tie
- Songwriters: Philip Labonte, Oli Herbert, Mike Martin, Jason Costa, Aaron Patrick
- Producer: Daniel Laskiewicz

All That Remains singles chronology
"Wasteland" (2018)	"Everything’s Wrong" (2018)	"Divine" (2024)

Music video
- "Everything's Wrong" on YouTube

"Everything’s Wrong" is a song by American heavy metal band All That Remains. It was released as the second single from their ninth album, Victim of the New Disease, on October 12, 2018. It reached number 25 on the U.S. Mainstream Rock chart.

== Reception ==
Loudwire claimed that the song was inverse of the album's first single "Fuck Love", adding "the track moves from a somber opening to a speedy verse, backing off the intensity as the chorus approaches, which frees up the singer to deliver a soaring vocal refrain."

Robert Pasbani of Metal Injection was critical of the Labonte using clean vocals on the song stating "the music is very adequate metalcore, and the production of the music is actually really nice and punchy. But then the vocals come in and ugh."

== Music video ==
On April 3, 2019 All That Remains released a music video for the song featuring former WWE wrestler Enzo Amore.

Lead vocalist Phil Labonte described the video, stating:

The video really captures the song’s meaning about how when something slips away,” vocalist Phil Labonte explains. “It can seem like the whole world has crashed down around you. Things that used to make sense no longer do. When something goes bad in your life, the ripple effect can really touch everything else—things you used to do, places you used to go, even people who you used to be friends with.

== Charts ==
Chart (2019)	Peak position
US Mainstream Rock (Billboard)	25
