= The Waiting One =

Single by All That Remains

from the album For We Are Many
- Released: October 31, 2011
- Genre: Melodic metalcore
- Length: 4:48
- Label: Prosthetic, Razor & Tie
- Songwriters: Johnny Lee Andrews, Jason Costa, Rob Graves, Oli Herbert, Philip Labonte, Mike Martin
- Producers: Adam Dutkiewicz, Rob Graves

All That Remains singles chronology
"The Last Time" (2011)	"The Waiting One" (2011)	"Stand Up" (2012)

Professional ratings
Review scores
Source	Rating
Loudwire	3.5/5 stars

"The Waiting One" is a power ballad by American heavy metal band All That Remains. The song was released as the third and final single from the band's fifth studio album For We Are Many. No music video was produced for the song.

== Reception ==
Loudwire reviewer Amy Sciaretto gave the song a positive review, calling it "deep, dark and daunting". Sciaretto said "the band isn’t afraid to show off a more sensitive side", citing the song's lyrics as sentimental.

== Track listing ==
No.	Title	Length
1.	"The Waiting One" (Radio Edit)	4:10
2.	"The Waiting One" (Album Version)	4:48

== Charts ==
=== Weekly charts ===
Chart (2011-2012)	Peak position
US Hot Rock & Alternative Songs (Billboard)	27
US Mainstream Rock (Billboard)	7
US Hot Rock Songs (Billboard)	27

=== Year-end charts ===
Year-end chart performance for "The Waiting One"
Chart (2012)	Position
US Hot Rock Songs (Billboard)	84
