= What If I Was Nothing =

Single by All That Remains

from the album A War You Cannot Win
- Released: September 4, 2013
- Recorded: 2012
- Length: 4:36
- Label: Razor & Tie
- Songwriters: Johnny Lee Andrews, Jason Costa, Rob Graves, Oli Herbert, Philip Labonte, Mike Martin
- Producer: Adam Dutkiewicz

All That Remains singles chronology
"Asking too Much" (2013)	"What If I Was Nothing" (2013)	"No Knock" (2014)

"What If I Was Nothing" is a power ballad by American heavy metal band All That Remains. The song was released as a single from their sixth album, A War You Cannot Win, on September 4, 2013, and a music video was released to YouTube on October 21, 2013. In the U.S., it peaked at number two on the Mainstream Rock Tracks chart and at number 3 on the Modern Rock Tracks chart.

== Background ==
Vocalist Phil Labonte originally found it a difficult track to lay down. He explained to Loudwire: "When I was in the studio, me and Adam Dutkiewicz were talking when I was doing vocals and stuff. When it comes to singing, I'm a machete, I'm not a scalpel. I'm far better at screaming or yelling in key than I am at soft, tender singing so the song was a struggle to do."

“It was cool that we actually got it done," he continued. "There were moments when I thought, 'I don't know if I'm going to be able to make it sound the way I want it to sound.' It was tough, trying to make a machete act like a scalpel." Guitarist Mike Martin also had a big impact on helping create the song.

The song is an example of All That Remains' shift toward a more mainstream, accessible sound, blending their metalcore origins with power ballad sensibilities. This single prominently features clean, melodic singing, and touches upon love and relationships. Labonte stated to The Pulse of Radio that initially not everyone in the band was on board with the song: "There was definitely conflict in the beginning," he said. "There are people that come from, you know, a school of thought that like this is what you're supposed to do and that's what you do. But you either play inside the safe zone or you really push the envelope, and pushing the envelope is a risk. That's the thing about trying new stuff - you're not gonna know when it's gonna, you know, strike a chord with people. You have no idea."

The song is one of the band's best performing commercially, with vocalist Phil Labonte stating that it is the band's biggest song.

== Music video ==
The music video for the song, released on October 21, 2013, reinforces the song's themes of a lifetime spent together. Directed by Rasa Acharya and Dan Kennedy, the video intersperses performance footage of the band with clips of a couple at different stages of their life, from childhood sweethearts to an elderly couple. This narrative visually captures the lyrical message of enduring commitment and love.

== Track listing ==
No.	Title	Length
1.	"What If I Was Nothing" (Radio Edit)	3:40

== Charts ==
Chart (2014)	Peak position
US Hot Rock & Alternative Songs (Billboard)	35
US Rock & Alternative Airplay (Billboard)	16
US Mainstream Rock (Billboard)	2

== Certifications ==
Region	Certification	Certified units/sales
United States (RIAA)	Gold	500,000^{‡}
^{‡} Sales+streaming figures based on certification alone.
