= Overcome (All That Remains album) =

Studio album by All That Remains
- Released: September 16, 2008
- Recorded: 2008
- Studios: Audio Hammer Studios, Sanford, Florida
- Genre: Melodic metalcore
- Length: 38:51
- Labels: Prosthetic; Razor & Tie
- Producer: Jason Suecof

All That Remains chronology
The Fall of Ideals (2006)	Overcome (2008)	For We Are Many (2010)

Singles from Overcome
- 1. "Chiron" Released: August 11, 2008; 2. "Two Weeks" Released: September 8, 2008; 3. "Forever in Your Hands" Released: June 15, 2009; 4. "Frozen" Released: October 7, 2009

Overcome is the fourth studio album by the American heavy metal band All That Remains. It was released on September 16, 2008. Overcome is the first album with drummer Jason Costa.

== Background ==
Adam Dutkiewicz, who produced the band's previous albums, did not have the time to produce Overcome. This resulted in Jason Suecof producing the album, and the band recording it in Florida instead of their usual home state of Massachusetts. Guitarist Mike Martin stated in an interview that it was tough for the band being on the road and then having to go down to Florida to record.

In an interview with Blabbermouth.net, Phil Labonte revealed the release date and stated Overcome would have “a more biting tone”, “tons of double bass, like twenty guitar solos and more hooks.” He also described it as “a much darker record than The Fall of Ideals” and added that it would reshape what people think of the band.

== Music ==
The album balances heavier, more aggressive elements (screamed vocals, fast riffs, double-bass drumming) with more melodic, clean singing, especially in choruses. Compared to the band’s previous album, The Fall of Ideals, Overcome is often seen as a somewhat more polished, less extreme album. Some of the more brutal or technical elements are toned down in favor of catchiness. Many lyrics deal with emotional/psychological themes such as struggle, personal angst, overcoming adversity, and reflections on inner wounds.

AllMusic wrote "the creative charge here is led by founding vocalist Phil Labonte, who consistently prioritizes clean-singing over savage growling” “meanwhile, see their instrumental contributions held ever in check by each song's optimal delivery; with Oli Herbert's flashiest guitar work saved exclusively for his consistently memorable solos."

Similarly, No Clean Singing wrote "The aggressive instrumental backdrop was still there, and Phil Labonte still made use of growly howls and piercing shrieks, but the overall tone of the album was more radio-friendly than the band’s preceding releases, and the single “Two Weeks” seemed overtly calculated to achieve crossover success. With nothing but clean singing in that song, it actually broke into stratospheric territory on the mainstream rock charts and helped land Overcome at No. 16 on the Billboard 200."

== Release and promotion ==
On July 21, 2008, two tracks from the new album, "Before the Damned" and "Relinquish", made their first appearance on the band's MySpace profile. Commenting on the tracks, Labonte stated, "This represents the heavier side of ATR. Last time we did this we put up 'The Weak Willed' and we feel like it's a bit of a tradition to really kick you in the nuts when we first show off new stuff! So here is the heaviest stuff we came up with for 'Overcome.'" "Chiron" made its first appearance on August 11, 2008, on the band's MySpace profile. The song was the first single from the album, with a behind-the-scenes shoot and the official music video submitted to YouTube.

"Two Weeks" was added to the band's MySpace page on September 8, 2008, to help promote the release of the song pack on Rock Band. It is the album's second single and a music video was released for it. The song has since become their biggest hit to date, and their first to enter the top ten on Billboard's Mainstream Rock Tracks. The band released their third single from the album, "Forever In Your Hands", to radio on June 15, 2009. This also featured an acoustic version of the song, the first time the band had released an acoustic song. Music videos were created for all three singles.

Two of the album's tracks, "Two Weeks" and "Chiron", were made available as downloadable content for Rock Band on September 9, 2008. The tracks were exclusive to Rock Band for one week before the album was released.

The album was officially released on September 16, 2008 and entered the Billboard 200 at #16, selling nearly 30,000 copies in its first week. Internationally, the album reached number 15 on the Canadian albums chart and number 82 in Japan. In 2023, Labonte announced that the record had sold over 500,000 copies.

On March 17, 2010, "Days Without" was released on the Rock Band Network as a downloadable song. On April 8, 2010, "Forever In Your Hands" followed. Finally, "Undone" was released on April 27, 2010.

== Critical reception ==
Professional ratings
Aggregate scores
Source	Rating
Metacritic	66%
Review scores
Source	Rating
Absolute Punk	78%
AllMusic	3/5 stars
All Metal Resource	4/7 stars
Alternative Press	3.5/5 stars
Blabbermouth.net	8/10 stars
IGN	7.9/10
Sputnikmusic	2.5/5 stars
Terrorizer	6/10 stars
Metal Underground	4/5 stars
Time For Metal Magazin	9/10 stars

The album received generally positive reviews, Ed Thompson, writing for IGN, stated “If nothing else Overcome shows progress and maturity. The band has incorporated catchy riffs and impossible-to-resist hooks with their trademark metalcore sound, proving that they not afraid to go places that other bands in the genre might not want to--or be able to--go.” Also crediting it for “Perfectly blending metalcore and melodic metal.” Metal Underground gave the album a positive review, saying “It is their strongest album to date and far surpasses its predecessors. The lyrics are just as strong as ever, the guitar work is still very intricate and challenging, and the rhythm section is very tight.” Blabbermouth.net noted the album's lyrical style, stating “It seems as if ALL THAT REMAINS approached "Overcome" as songwriters first and metalheads second, but did so in a manner that sacrificed little of the album's inherent metallic rage. From start to finish, it shows that the group has the ability to evolve and expand without losing sight of the sound that worked for them in the first place.” Ultimate Guitar wrote "Overcome is a decent album and is bound to satisfy most of those who fell in love with The Fall of Ideals, but some may be left disgruntled by the fact that ATR haven't progressed their sound very much, if at all." They added that "Overcome relies on the same bag of tricks that are so common in metalcore. It's not bad, but not great either."

In 2010 Overcome took home Best Hard Rock/Metal album at the 9th Annual Independent Music Awards.

== Track listing ==
All lyrics are written by Philip Labonte, except where noted; all music is composed by All That Remains, except where noted.

No.	Title	Writer(s)	Length
1.	"Before the Damned"		2:53
2.	"Two Weeks"		4:17
3.	"Undone"		3:12
4.	"Forever in Your Hands"		3:36
5.	"Chiron"		4:24
6.	"Days Without"		3:11
7.	"A Song for the Hopeless"		4:15
8.	"Do Not Obey"		3:11
9.	"Relinquish"		2:51
10.	"Overcome"		2:38
11.	"Believe in Nothing" (Nevermore cover)	Warrel Dane; Jeff Loomis	4:23
Total length:			38:51

Japanese edition bonus track
No.	Title	Length
12.	"Frozen"	3:31
Total length:		42:22

== Personnel ==
All That Remains

- Philip Labonte – vocals
- Oli Herbert – lead guitar
- Mike Martin – guitar
- Jeanne Sagan – bass
- Jason Costa – drums

Credits adapted from the official release of this LP

Production

- Jason Suecof – producer, engineer
- Mark Lewis – additional and mix engineering
- Ted Pierce – additional engineering
- Ryan Smith – mastering at Sterling Sound, New York, NY

Management

- E.J. Johantgen and Dan Fitzgerald – A&R
- Stephen Hutton and Lucas Keller for Uppercut Management
- Mike McKoy – legal representation for Serling, Rooks & Ferrara
- Josh Kline – booking for The Agency Group
- Murray Richman – business management for Richman Business Management

Artwork

- Carson Slovak – artwork design and layout

== Charts ==
Chart (2008)	Peak position
Canadian Albums (Billboard)	15
Japanese Albums (Oricon)	82
US Billboard 200	16
US Digital Albums (Billboard)	16
US Top Hard Rock Albums (Billboard)	5
US Top Rock Albums (Billboard)	5
US Indie Store Album Sales (Billboard)	8
