= Stand Up (All That Remains song) =

Single by All That Remains

from the album A War You Cannot Win
- Released: August 13, 2012
- Recorded: 2012
- Genre: Alternative metal
- Length: 4:00
- Label: Razor & Tie
- Songwriters: Johnny Lee Andrews; Jason Costa; Rob Graves; Oli Herbert; Philip Labonte; Mike Martin
- Producer: Adam Dutkiewicz

All That Remains singles chronology
"The Waiting One" (2012)	"Stand Up" (2012)	"Asking Too Much" (2013)

Music video
- "Stand Up" on YouTube

"Stand Up" is a song by American heavy metal band All That Remains. The song was released as a single from their sixth album, A War You Cannot Win, on August 13, 2012, and a music video was released to YouTube on November 19, 2012. In the U.S., it reached number one on the Mainstream Rock chart.

== Background ==
The track marked a notable shift in the band's musical direction towards a more accessible, radio-friendly hard rock sound, relying on clean vocals rather than the growls of their earlier material.

== Reception ==
Amy Sciarretto of Loudwire wrote on the song stating "It is a mid-tempo rock song that is anything but vanilla, especially when compared to a lot of sanitized rock on the FM dial. However, diehard headbangers may not like the lack of aggression in the vocals. The band has a catalog full of that style, and ATR are pushing forward and keeping things interesting and evolved."

== Track listing ==
No.	Title	Length
1.	"Stand Up" (Album Version)	4:00

== Charts ==
Chart (2011)	Peak position
US Hot Rock & Alternative Songs (Billboard)	19
US Mainstream Rock (Billboard)	1
US Active Rock (Billboard)	1
