= For All of This =

EP by The Early November
- Released: December 6, 2002
- Studio: Portrait Recording Studios, Pompton Plains, New Jersey
- Genre: Indie rock, emo, post-hardcore
- Length: 31:53
- Label: Drive-Thru Records
- Producer: Chris Badami

The Early November chronology
For All of This (2002)	The Room's Too Cold (2003)

Professional ratings
Review scores
Source	Rating
ReadJunk	2/5 stars
Drowned in Sound	2.5/5 stars

For All of This is the debut EP by American rock band The Early November, released on December 6, 2002 through Drive Thru Records.

== Background and composition ==
The album was written entirely by lead vocalist Ace Enders. The album also features John Dubitsky, who briefly replaced Joseph Marro on guitar.

The album's title comes from the first line of the chorus in "I Want to Hear You Sad".

== Track listing ==
All songs written by Arthur Enders.

1. "Every Night's Another Story" – 2:46
2. "I Want to Hear You Sad" – 3:30
3. "All We Ever Needed" – 3:00
4. "Sunday Drive" – 3:53
5. "Take Time and Find" – 3:43
6. "Ashala Rock" – 2:50
7. "Come Back" – 2:54
8. "We Write the Wrong" – 9:17
- The Enhanced CD comes with a video of Ace playing "Open Eyes" (previously unreleased) and "Sunday Drive" on an acoustic guitar in his basement.
- "I Want To Hear You Sad" has an acoustic rendition on Aces band I Can Make A Mess Like Nobody's Business acoustic album "Dust'n Off the Ol" Gee-Tar."

== Personnel ==
- Sergio Anello — bass
- John Dubitsky — guitar
- Arthur 'Ace' Enders — vocals, guitar
- Jeff Kummer — drums
