= Fifteen Years =

Compilation album by The Early November
- Released: January 20, 2017
- Studio: The Living Room Recording, Hammonton, New Jersey
- Length: 46:55
- Label: Bad Timing Records
- Producer: Ace Enders

The Early November chronology
Imbue (2015)	Fifteen Years (2017)	Lilac (2019)

Fifteen Years is a compilation album by The Early November. It includes 15 new acoustic recordings from the course of the band's career.

== Track listing ==
All songs written by Ace Enders.

1. "Narrow Mouth" - 04:11
2. "Outside" - 04:06
3. "The Mountain Range In My Living Room" - 03:51
4. "Boxing Timelines" - 03:44
5. "Tell Me Why" - 03:40
6. "A Little More Time" - 03:27
7. "Decoration" - 03:14
8. "Call Off The Bells" - 04:02
9. "Frayed In Doubt" - 03:40
10. "I Don't Care" - 04:16
11. "In Currents" - 03:05
12. "Figure It Out" - 03:45
13. "Driving South" - 03:16
14. "Sunday Drive" - 03:40
15. "Ever So Sweet" - 04:58

== Personnel ==
- Arthur "Ace" Enders – vocals, rhythm guitar
- Jeff Kummer – drums
- Joseph Marro – guitar, keyboard, piano
- Bill Lugg – lead guitar
- Sergio Anello – bass
