= I Can Make a Mess Like Nobody's Business (album) =

Studio album by I Can Make a Mess Like Nobody's Business
- Released: October 26, 2004
- Studio: Portrait Studios, Lincoln Park, New Jersey
- Genre: Rock
- Length: 52:45
- Label: Drive-Thru
- Producer: Chris Badami, Arthur Enders

I Can Make a Mess Like Nobody's Business chronology
I Can Make a Mess Like Nobody's Business (2004)	The World We Know (2010)

Professional ratings
Review scores
Source	Rating
Punktastic	4/5 link

I Can Make a Mess Like Nobody's Business is the solo release from the Early November frontman Ace Enders on Drive-Thru Records, released on October 26, 2004. Spartanburg Herald-Journal include the album on their list of the best albums of the year.

== Music videos ==
There are official music videos for "The Best Happiness Money Can Buy" and "So I Finally Decided to Give Myself a Reason"

== Track listing ==
- (All songs written by Arthur Enders)
1. "Untitled" – 2:07
2. "Whispering" – 3:36
3. "So I Finally Decided to Give Myself a Reason" – 3:06
4. "Timshel" – 3:51
5. "The Best Happiness Money Can Buy" – 1:47
6. "An Oak Tree Stands Beside a Linden" – 4:14
7. "But When the Little Fellow Came Close and Put Both Arms Around His Mother, and Kissed Her in an Appealing Boyish Fashion, She Was Moved to Tenderness" – 3:33
8. "Untitled" – 4:25
9. "Untitled" – 3:14
10. "The Kindler Burns" – 2:56
11. "End of the Background Noise" – 4:45
12. "Untitled" – 3:54
13. "Untitled" – 3:44
14. "I Know the Sum and Substance of My Evil" – 4:29
15. "Salvy" – 3:00

== Personnel ==
- Arthur Enders – vocals, guitar, production
- Chris Badami – production, recording, engineering, mixing, drums, additional vocals
- Bill Lugg – additional guitar on Untitled 1, slide guitar on The Best Happiness Money Can Buy
- Michelle Dispenziere – assistant engineer
- Paul Spinella – assistant engineer, additional vocals
- David Rimelis – string arrangement, conductor
- Evelyn Estava – violin
- Elizabeth Schulze – viola
- Gerall Hieser – cello
- Jeff Kummer – beat box and drums on End of the Background Noise
- Joshua M. Ortega – photography, design
