= The World We Know =

The World We Know may refer to:

- The World We Know (Ace Enders album)
- The World We Know (Stan Kenton album)

== See also ==
- The World We Knew, a 1967 album by Frank Sinatra
