= Asking Too Much =

Single by All That Remains

from the album A War You Cannot Win
- Released: March 18, 2013
- Recorded: 2012
- Genre: Alternative metal
- Length: 3:28
- Label: Razor & Tie
- Songwriters: Jason Costa; Rob Graves; Oli Herbert; Philip Labonte; Mike Martin
- Producer: Adam Dutkiewicz

All That Remains singles chronology
"Stand Up" (2012)	"Asking Too Much" (2013)	"What If I Was Nothing" (2013)

"Asking Too Much" is a song by American heavy metal band All That Remains. The song was released as a single from their sixth album, A War You Cannot Win, on March 18, 2013, and a music video was released to YouTube on April 30, 2013. In the US, it peaked at number fourteen on the Mainstream Rock Tracks chart. Loudwire claimed that the song was "very melodic and memorable".

== Charts ==
Chart performance for "Asking Too Much"
Chart (2013)	Peak position
US Mainstream Rock (Billboard)	14
