= Conversations (Roses Are Red album) =

Studio album by Roses Are Red
- Released: Sept 21, 2004
- Length: 35:50
- Label: Trustkill records
- Producer: Chris Badami

Roses Are Red chronology
Handshakes and Heartbreaks (2004)	Conversations (2004)	What Became of Me (2006)

Conversations is the second studio album by American rock band Roses Are Red.

Punknews.org rated the album one star, stating "In case my sarcasm wasn't clear enough, then let me say this, please do not even listen to this album for shits and giggles. I've seriously heard better music on Casio keyboard demos."

== Track listing ==
No.	Title	Length
1.	"White and Gold"	3:12
2.	"I Felt I Knew Her"	3:22
3.	"Time Signals Progress"	4:19
4.	"Oceans"	4:11
5.	"I Apologize"	3:30
6.	"12:34"	1:29
7.	"Silver Linings"	4:09
8.	"300 Motion Pictures"	3:16
9.	"You and Me Both"	3:58
10.	"Conversations"	4:24
Total length:		35:50

== Personnel ==
- Vincent Minervino - vocals/piano
- Michael Lasaponara - drums
- Kevin Mahoney - bass guitar
- Matthew Gordner - guitar
- Brian Gordner - guitar
