= Two Weeks (All That Remains song) =

2008 single by All That Remains

Single by All That Remains

from the album Overcome
- Released: September 18, 2008
- Recorded: 2008
- Genre: Melodic metalcore
- Length: 4:17
- Label: Prosthetic
- Songwriters: Jason Costa, Oli Herbert, Philip Labonte, Mike Martin
- Producer: Jason Suecof

All That Remains singles chronology
"Chiron" (2008)	"Two Weeks" (2008)	"Forever in Your Hands" (2009)

"Two Weeks" is a song by American heavy metal band All That Remains. It was released as the second single from their fourth album, Overcome, on September 18, 2008, and a music video was released to television on October 4, 2008. In the U.S., it peaked at number 9 on the Mainstream Rock Tracks chart and at number 38 on the Modern Rock Tracks chart. It was a free playable download on the iPhone OS game, Tap Tap Revenge 2. It was also a downloadable Rock Band song, along with "This Calling" and "Chiron". The single was certified platinum by the Recording Industry Association of America (RIAA) on November 16, 2022, for selling over 1,000,000 copies in the United States.

The lyrics depict a sense of perseverance and loyalty, expressing a commitment to not giving up on a relationship, even when faced with problems.

Fans regard the song's guitar solo as being among the best in the metalcore genre, according to Loudwire. Additionally Ultimate Guitar dubbed it one of the most era defining metalcore songs of the 2000s.

== Legacy ==
In a 2014 interview, guitarist Mike Martin reflected on the song, stating, "To be perfectly honest, what made that record special is “Two Weeks”. We don’t play any songs off that record except for “Two Weeks” and “Forever In Your Hands”. The biggest deal about that record is “Two Weeks,” which is still the biggest song we have ever had. That was the biggest move for our career; it tacked 10 more years onto our career. We had no idea it was going to do that; it was a complete accident. It got on the radio and on stations, and people were just flipping over it. We never had a song last that long on the radio. It was just one of those things that really worked out in our favor. Every ounce of success of Overcome was because of “Two Weeks”.

== Track listing ==
No.	Title	Length
1.	"Two Weeks" (Radio edit)	3:52
2.	"Two Weeks" (Album version)	4:17

== Charts ==
Chart (2009)	Peak position
US Alternative Airplay (Billboard)	38
US Hot Rock & Alternative Songs (Billboard)	41
US Mainstream Rock (Billboard)	9

== Certifications ==
Region	Certification	Certified units/sales
United States (RIAA)	Platinum	1,000,000^{‡}
^{‡} Sales+streaming figures based on certification alone.
