= Roses Are Red (band) =

American rock band

- Origin: Rochester, New York, United States
- Genres: Emo, alternative rock
- Years active: 2002–2007, 2024
- Labels: Trustkill Records
- Members: Vincent Minervino; Michael Lasaponara; Shaun Murphy; Tom Zenns
- Past members: Andy Champion; Kevin Mahoney; Matthew Gordner; Brian Gordner; Brad Gilboe

Roses Are Red is a rock band formed in Rochester, New York. The band was signed to Trustkill Records.

== History ==
Roses Are Red (originally named Nobody Cares) formed in the summer of 2002 from members of other bands around the Western New York area. It originally featured Vincent Minervino on vocals, Brian and Matthew Gordner on guitars, Kevin Mahoney on bass, and Michael Lasaponara on drums. Just 2 months after forming, the band recorded a 4-song demo and toured on weekends throughout the fall and winter of 2002. Their first full-length album, Handshakes and Heartbreaks, was released in June 2003 and was followed by a tour of the United States in July and August 2003. The band was named "The Next Big Thing" by Absolutepunk.net, and label interest soon followed. In the spring of 2004, Roses Are Red signed with New Jersey–based indie label Trustkill Records.

After select dates on the 2004 Warped Tour, the band released Conversations in the fall of 2004. The album was produced by Chris Badami (The Early November, The Starting Line). The band toured in support of Conversations, supporting The Plain White T's, Underoath, Silverstein, Matchbook Romance, Chiodos and Hawthorne Heights. RAR returned to the Warped Tour in 2005, playing alongside Boys Night Out, Armor For Sleep, From First To Last and Emery.

In March 2005, while touring with A Thorn For Every Heart, Kevin Mahoney left the band and was replaced by Brad Gilboe, from Detroit. Mahoney began playing guitar for Polar Bear Club. In 2006, he would re-join the band to record and release their second album, but left shortly after and was replaced by Andy Champion. Both Matthew and Brian Gordner left the band in late 2005. Shaun Murphy joined the band shortly after and was followed by Tom Zenns.

Roses Are Red spent the early part of 2006 writing and recording their second album, What Became Of Me, which was released in June 2006 and was one of Alternative Press Magazine's 'Most Anticipated Albums Of 2006'. The album was produced by Brian McTernan (Thrice, Circa Survive, Darkest Hour, Senses Fail).

After the departure of Michael Lasaponara and Shaun Murphy in February 2007, just after the conclusion of the Glitz 'N Glamour tour (which they headlined and featured Rookie of the Year, Scenes From A Movie, and Four Letter Lie), the band went on hiatus and ultimately disbanded.

== Post-break up ==
Tom Zenns joined the band Time & Distance, but left shortly after. Andy Champion also joined T&D around the same time, playing bass, before leaving to join Zenns in his new project, Love or Lust. Zenns later went on to brief eSports career, seeing him in the 2018 draft pool for the NBA2K League, however he went undrafted. Later he went on to complete Sekiro: Shadows Die Twice three times on stream for over 1000 viewers gaining him popularity amongst the games community. Champion eventually left LOL and briefly played in the Buffalo, New York–based band The Boy And His Machine and is a current member of Losers Club. Michael Lasaponara played drums in the California-based-band William Tell for a short while, appearing on Last Call with Carson Daly. He then began doing drum tech work for bands such as The Used, The Academy Is..., Armor For Sleep, Cobra Starship and Chiodos before playing drums in Cute Is What We Aim For until their short-lived break-up in 2009. He is now with the New York band Nocturnal Me. Brian Gordner is now a tour manager and has worked with Straylight Run and Augustana, while his brother Matthew is the General Manager of Portland-based indie label Rise Records. Kevin Mahoney now plays guitar in Hit The Lights and a side project by the name of Holy War. Vincent Minervino formed post-hardcore group My Island after moving to New Jersey in 2007. The band played a few shows in before Minervino left the project and formed surf-pop group The Brigantines as vocalist and guitarist. In 2014, Minervino switched to drums to form instrumental “surf-noir” trio Black Flamingos, based out of Asbury Park, NJ. He and his wife have since launched Hi-Tide Recordings & Nu-Tone – a record label group specializing in surf, lounge, exotica, Latin soul, cinematic funk, and more.

== Reunion ==
In August 2024, after a 16-year hiatus, it was announced on social media that the band was working on new material and would be playing a show on September 21, 2024, in Rochester to commemorate the 20th anniversary of Conversations. The album, along with What Became Of Me were both released on vinyl for the very first time, shortly after the debut of the new track "Memento" on September 2.

== Band members ==
Current line-up

- Vincent Minervino – vocals
- Michael Lasaponara – drums
- Shaun Murphy – guitar/vocals
- Tom Zenns – guitar

Former members

- Kevin Mahoney – bass guitar/vocals
- Matthew Gordner – guitar
- Brian Gordner – guitar
- Brad Gilboe – bass guitar/vocals
- Andy Champion – bass guitar

== Discography ==
- Handshakes and Heartbreaks (2003)
- Conversations (2004)
- What Became of Me (2006)

== Other appearances ==
- "White & Gold" from Take Action!, Vol. 4 (2004) and Warped Tour 2005 Compilation (2005)
- "Last Christmas" from Taste of Christmas (2005)
- "Cherub Rock" from The Killer in You: A Tribute to Smashing Pumpkins (2005)
- "300 Motion Pictures" from Trustkill Takeover Vol.1 (2005), Music On the Brain, Vol.2 (2005) and The Best of Taste of Chaos (2006)
- "We Never Knew" from Trustkill Takeover Vol.2 (2006)
- "Failing" from Warped Tour 2006 Compilation (2006)
