= Forever in Your Hands =

Single by All That Remains

from the album Overcome
- Released: June 15, 2009
- Recorded: 2008
- Genre: Metalcore
- Length: 3:37
- Label: Prosthetic
- Songwriters: Jason Costa, Oli Herbert, Philip Labonte, Mike Martin
- Producer: Jason Suecof

All That Remains singles chronology
"Two Weeks" (2008)	"Forever in Your Hands" (2009)	"Hold On" (2010)

"Forever in Your Hands" is the third single from the album Overcome by American heavy metal band All That Remains. The single contains the first full acoustic song by the band ever to be recorded in the studio. It is their second single to crack the top 20 in the Hot Mainstream Rock Tracks chart, peaking at number 15.

On April 8, 2010, the song is available as a playable track for the Rock Band Network.

== Music videos ==
The music video for the radio edit of the song premiered on October 7, 2009. A second video for the album version of the song was released on November 30, 2009, featuring footage of their performance at Rockstar Energy Mayhem Fest.

== Track listing ==
No.	Title	Length
1.	"Forever in Your Hands" (radio edit)	3:18
2.	"Forever In Your Hands" (acoustic version)	3:37

== Charts ==
Chart (2009)	Peak position
US Hot Rock & Alternative Songs (Billboard)	33
