= Enola (album) =

Studio album by I Can Make a Mess
- Released: June 11, 2013
- Recorded: 2013
- Genre: Acoustic
- Length: 39:20
- Label: Rise
- Producer: Ace Enders

I Can Make a Mess chronology
Gold Rush (2011)	Enola (2013)	Growing In (2014)

Enola is I Can Make a Mess's fourth full-length studio album. The album was released through Rise Records. This is the first album in which the band has gone by the name I Can Make a Mess instead of the original I Can Make a Mess Like Nobody's Business.

== Track listing ==
1. "Enola" — 3:40
2. "Wrinkle" — 3:40
3. "Close Enough" — 3:35
4. "Adaptation Cell" — 2:50
5. "Listen Lesson / Keep Away" — 3:51
6. "Tidal Wave" — 4:23
7. "Lions" — 4:09
8. "Ancient Crows" — 3:06
9. "What Happens Now" — 3:26
10. "Burn It All Down" — 3:35
11. "Thin White Line" — 3:05

== Music videos ==
A music video for the opening track, Enola, was released by Rise Records. It was shot and produced by el.de.te productions.
