= Australia (EP) =

Australia EP

EP by Ace Enders and a Million Different People
- Released: February 2009
- Genre: Rock, indie rock
- Length: 17:14
- Producer: Arthur Enders

Ace Enders and a Million Different People chronology
The Secret Wars (2008)	Australia EP (2009)	When I Hit the Ground (2009)

Australia EP is an EP, recorded by American rock musician Ace Enders. The record was recorded for his Australian fans, to make up for the previous Australian tour that he was forced to cancel. Limited to only 200 copies the Australia EP was only available during Ace's Australian tour with the Soundwave Festival. The Album was distributed to fans in February 2009.

== Track listing ==
1. "Ready Ankles" – 4:29
2. "Rosary" – 4:22
3. "Baby Steps" – 3:41
4. "Open Windows" – 4:43
