= In Currents =

Studio album by the Early November
- Released: July 10, 2012
- Studios: The Living Room Recording, Hammonton, New Jersey
- Genres: Alternative rock, indie rock
- Length: 41:39
- Label: Rise

The Early November chronology
The Mother, the Mechanic, and the Path (2006)	In Currents (2012)	Imbue (2015)

Professional ratings
Review scores
Source	Rating
AltPress	4/5
Under The Gun Review	8/10

In Currents is the third studio album by the Early November. It is their first release on Rise Records.

== Release ==
In May and June 2012, The Early November went on tour with the Wonder Years, the Swellers and Young Statues. In Currents was released on July 10, 2012 following an extended hiatus, marking the band's first release in six years. In Currents debuted at number 43 on the Billboard 200. In October, the group went on a headlining US tour with Cartel and Seahaven in support of the album. In between some of the dates on the tour, the group supported All Time Low. On October 5, a music video was released for the title track, "In Currents". On May 22, 2013, a music video was released for "Tell Me Why". In the summer, the group performed on Warped Tour.

== Track listing ==
All music is composed by Arthur Enders.

No.	Title	Length
1.	"A Stain on the Carpet"	3:33
2.	"Frayed in Doubt"	3:40
3.	"In Currents"	3:25
4.	"Digital Age"	2:06
5.	"Tell Me Why"	3:46
6.	"Close to You"	3:31
7.	"Guilt & Swell"	3:42
8.	"That's Not Your Real Name"	2:55
9.	"Like a Kid"	3:51
10.	"The Smell of This Place"	3:25
11.	"Wearing the Tie"	3:24
12.	"Call Off the Bells"	4:23
Total length:		41:39

== Notes ==
- "That's Not Your Real Name" was originally released by Ace Enders on his 2012 EP "Share with Everyone".

== Charts ==
Chart performance for In Currents
Chart (2012)	Peak position
US Billboard 200	43
US Independent Albums (Billboard)	6
U.S. Billboard Vinyl Albums	1
