= Dust'n Off the Ol' Guitar =

Studio album by I Can Make a Mess Like Nobody's Business
- Released: September 10, 2010
- Recorded: 2010
- Genre: Acoustic

I Can Make a Mess Like Nobody's Business chronology
The World We Know (2010)	Dust'n Off the Ol' Guitar (2010)	Happy Christmas (2010)

Dust'n Off the Ol' Guitar is an acoustic collection of songs from by Ace Enders, the third using the name I Can Make a Mess Like Nobody's Business. The album was released on September 16, 2010. Ace Enders including new versions of old favorites from his bands The Early November, I Can Make a Mess Like Nobody's Business and A Million Different People and a new song from I Can Make a Mess.

== Order packages ==
When buying the album, fans could choose between several different packages ranging from $10 to $150. Different packages included digital and physical copies of the CD, T-shirts, or lithographs. The most expensive option was the "Piece of History Package". Upon purchasing this package: You will receive a one of a kind piece of history from The Early November's The Mother, The Mechanic & The Path - a page of lyrics from the time a song was written, story board from record planning, etc. Only 30 pieces of history are available.

== Track listing ==
1. "Growing Pains" — 4:33
2. "Baby Blue" — 4:19
3. "Body Like Mind" — 3:55
4. "No Good at Saying Sorry" — 4:01
5. "When I Hit the Ground" — 4:44
6. "Something That Produces Results" — 3:44
7. "I Want to Hear You Sad" — 3:37
- Upon announcing this album's production, Enders gathered suggestions from fans on which songs they would like to hear on the album.

== Bonus songs ==
This message was posted on the official I Can Make a Mess online store: Three free songs (Pretty Pretty, 1000 Times a Day remix and Decoration) will be sent to you once the album hits 5,000 sales. Let us give you free music by helping us promote!

Although many people believe the 5,000 sales goals was hit, these songs were never sent out to those who purchased the album.
