= Madness (All That Remains album) =

Studio album by All That Remains
- Released: April 28, 2017
- Recorded: 2016
- Studios: West Valley Studios, Woodland Hills, California, U.S.
- Genres: Alternative metal; melodic metalcore
- Length: 50:21
- Labels: Razor & Tie; Concord Bicycle Music
- Producer: Howard Benson

All That Remains chronology
The Order of Things (2015)	Madness (2017)	Victim of the New Disease (2018)

Singles from Madness
- 1. "Madness" Released: February 3, 2017; 2. "Safe House" Released: February 3, 2017; 3. "Halo" Released: March 24, 2017; 4. "Louder" Released: April 13, 2017; 5. "The Thunder Rolls" Released: August 22, 2017

Madness is the eighth studio album by the American heavy metal band All That Remains. It was released on April 28, 2017, on Razor & Tie Records. Madness is their first studio album produced by Howard Benson, as well as the first album to feature bassist Aaron Patrick. While this is the band's next-to-last album with guitarist Oli Herbert, it is also their last album to be released in his lifetime.

== Background ==
In the past All That Remains would start the process with guitar riffs, then add vocals and lyrics. But for Madness, under producer Howard Benson, they reversed that: Labonte and other writers started with lyrics/vocals (melodies), then got chord progressions and riffs around that. Vocalist Phil Labonte told Revolver magazine about band's approach on the new disc: "We wanted to mix it up a little bit and write from a vocal perspective this time. So I went to L.A. and came up with vocal ideas and melodies and then sent those chord progressions back to Oli Herbert and he wrote riffs in response to that. Doing it this way turned the record into a vocal album as opposed to a guitar album. And that affected some things. Like, there might be less intricacy in the riffs because they were written in response to my voice." He also called the album a natural progression of their sound.

== Musical style ==
Labonte added that the majority of the new songs features "significant programming and electronic sounds. And that's something we wanted to have flowing through the entire record. So you're gonna hear that kind of influence on most of the tracks."

Phil also stated: "On this record, there's five songs on the record that are exactly what you would expect from All That Remains. There's some songs where we kind of were, like, 'All right, let's push this and maybe change what we can do, or what All That Remains is allowed to do.' But it ain't like we're not heavy anymore. And if you're just, like, 'Oh, they're not heavy anymore,' then you're just not listening."

The lyrics touch upon repeating harmful patterns, societal critiques, and a defiant "stick it to the man" attitude . Songs such as "Louder" and "Trust and Believe" are about standing up for oneself, not letting others define you, being assertive in who you are. The music video for the title track received praise for sending a powerful message on post-traumatic stress disorder of military vets.

== Reception ==
Professional ratings
Review scores
Source	Rating
Distorted Sound	5/10
Exclaim!	4/10
Metal Hammer	2.5/5 stars
Rock Revolt	4/5 stars
Digital Journal	4.5/5 stars
Metal Temple	8/10
Ultimate Guitar	6/10

The album received mixed reviews. Aaron J. Marko of Exclaim! described the album as mediocre, generic and archaic. Christopher Di Carlo of Overdrive magazine, on the other hand, described the album as beautiful yet heavy. Jeannie Blue for Cryptic Rock stated “Madness is a somewhat schizophrenic dichotomy: equal parts pulsating, crushing bass and drums that echo the siren’s song of Thrash Metal with infectious choruses, catchy melodies, and atmospheric sounds that oft whisper of those Christian Rock folk.” Ultimate Guitar wrote “It's not an atrocious album, and if it had been released by a much lesser-known band that hadn't been known for putting out much better work, it might even be worthy of some genuine praise. But All That Remains can do so much better.” Mike of Didgital Journal on the other hand gave it a more positive review stating “These songs are made to be performed in a live setting, and the band as a whole showcases their talent on this project. This CD is a must for any heavy metal fan.”

== Track listing ==
All lyrics written by Phil Labonte; all music composed by All That Remains, except "The Thunder Rolls," written by Garth Brooks and Pat Alger.

No.	Title	Length
1.	"Safe House"	3:37
2.	"Madness"	3:24
3.	"Nothing I Can Do"	3:41
4.	"If I'm Honest"	4:23
5.	"Halo"	4:03
6.	"Louder"	3:11
7.	"River City"	5:34
8.	"Open Grave"	3:42
9.	"Far from Home"	4:05
10.	"Trust and Believe"	3:14
11.	"Back to You"	3:25
12.	"Never Sorry"	3:39
13.	"The Thunder Rolls" (Garth Brooks cover)	4:23
Total length:		50:21

== Personnel ==
=== All That Remains ===
- Philip Labonte – lead vocals, art direction, cover design
- Oli Herbert – lead guitar
- Mike Martin – rhythm guitar
- Aaron Patrick – bass guitar, backing vocals
- Jason Costa – drums

=== Additional musicians ===
- Mark Sereikas – additional guitar on "Thunder Rolls"
- Benny Goodman – piano/keyboards and additional engineering/production on Thunder Rolls at Speak EZ Studios, Randolph, MA
- Cory Paza – bass and additional engineering/production on Thunder rolls at Speak EZ Studios, Randolph, MA

==== Freedom Chorus ====
- Diamante (also does additional vocals on "Thunder Rolls")
- Meron Ryan
- Sidnie Tipton
- Lenny Skolnik
- Seann Bowe

=== Production ===
- Howard Benson – production, mixing
- Mike Plotnikoff – co-production, engineering
- Hatsukazu "Hatch" Inagaki – engineering
- Shaun Ezrol and Carl Stoodt – assistant engineering
- Bob Ludwig – mastering
- Lenny Skolnik, Seann Bowe, Howard Benson – keyboards and programming
- Marc VanGool – guitar tech
- Jon Nicholson at Drum Fetish – drum tech
- Joe Rickard – pre-production, drum programming
- Igor Khoroshev – string arrangement on "Back to You"
- Paul DeCarli – digital editing
- Nick Haussling – A&R
- Tom Gnolfo – A&R administration
- Diamante Azzura – backing vocals
- Josh Strock – composition

== Charts ==
Chart (2017)	Peak position
Canadian Albums (Billboard)	77
US Billboard 200	50
US Top Rock Albums (Billboard)	9
US Top Hard Rock Albums (Billboard)	1
