= Ace Enders =

American musician (born 1982)

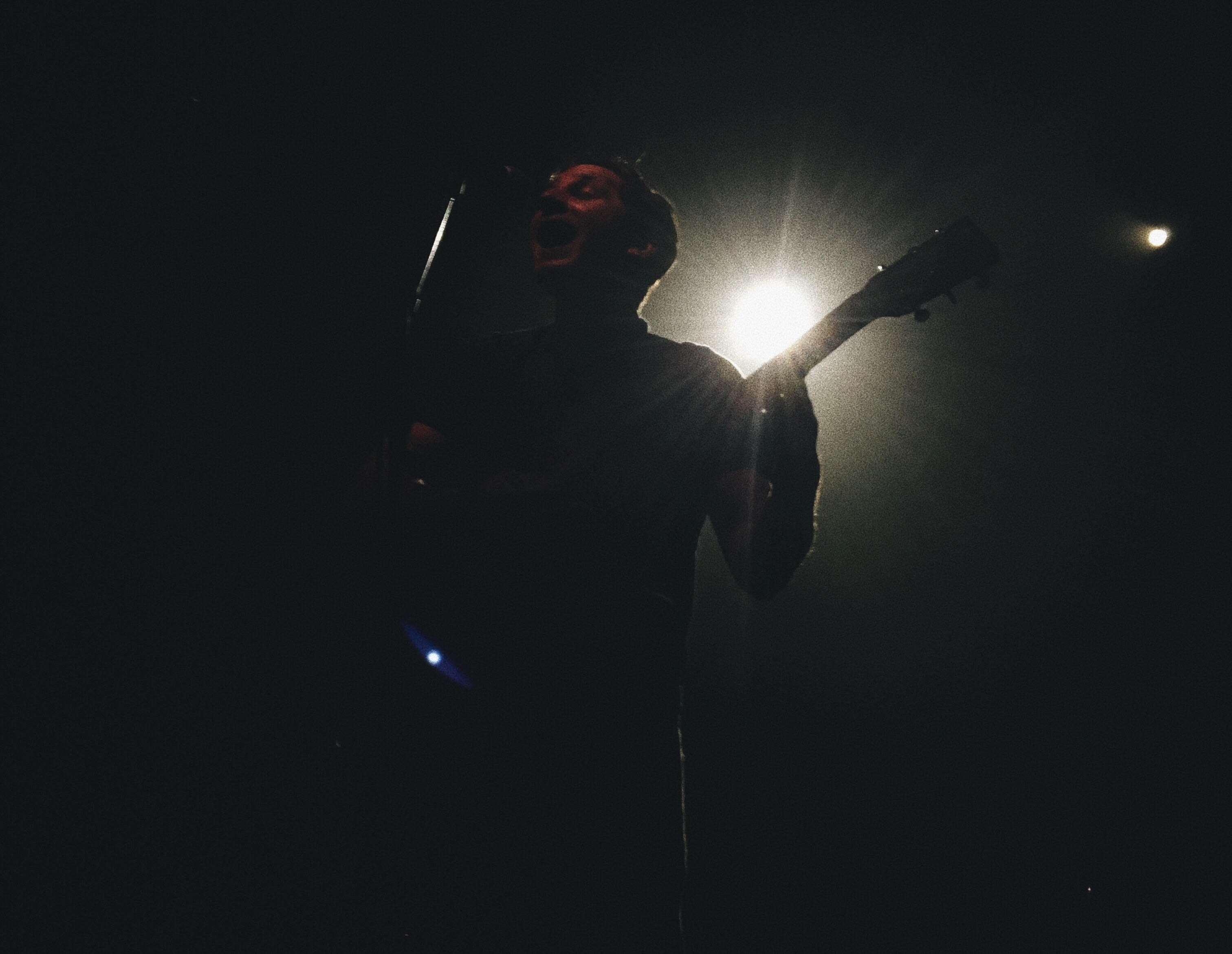
- Ace Enders performing at the Union Transfer in Philadelphia in 2017.

Background information
- Born: Arthur Carl Enders III; April 19, 1982 (age 44)
- Origin: Hammonton, New Jersey, United States
- Genres: Alternative rock, indie rock, folk
- Occupations: Singer, songwriter, instrumentalist, record producer
- Years active: 1999–present
- Labels: Drive-Thru Records, Regular Music, Rise Records, Pure Noise Records

Arthur Carl "Ace" Enders III (born April 19, 1982) is an American musician who is the lead singer and guitarist of the band The Early November. He is also the lead musician, songwriter and co-producer in his band I Can Make a Mess Like Nobody's Business. He has also released music under the name Ace Enders and a Million Different People.

== Biography ==
=== Introduction to music and The Early November ===
Enders began playing guitar after being inspired by watching his step dad, Robert Gazzara, play in a band. Enders taught himself how to play his step dad's old guitar.

In February 2001, Enders along with guitarist Jim Sacco, bassist Sergio Anello and drummer Jeff Kummer formed The Early November. In 2003, after the release of their first two EPs For All of This, and The Acoustic EP, the band released their debut full-length album The Room's Too Cold.

In 2004, Enders started his own solo project I Can Make a Mess Like Nobody's Business, releasing the self-titled album on October 26, 2004. Enders later stated in a 2008 interview that I Can Make a Mess Like Nobody's Business "was a one-album thing".

Recording of the third Early November album began in February 2005. The album, titled The Mother, the Mechanic, and the Path, was a triple disc concept album with an entwining plot of a torn family, from the perspective of a growing child. The album took over a year to complete due to a multitude of issues, but was eventually released in 2006. They embarked on a brief headline tour in early 2007 with The Rocket Summer, Melee, and The Verdict. On March 13, 2007, on the eve of the tour's conclusion, The Early November announced that the band had agreed to go on an indefinite hiatus to spend more time with loved ones. Their final pre-hiatus show was a March 15, 2007 performance at South By Southwest.

Enders, along with the rest of The Early November, reunited and began performing again in 2011. Since reuniting, they have released four studio albums, and have toured with acts such as The Wonder Years, Cartel, All Time Low, Young Statues, The Swellers, Seahaven, Man Overboard, Into It. Over It., Hit The Lights, and more.

=== Ace Enders and a Million Different People ===
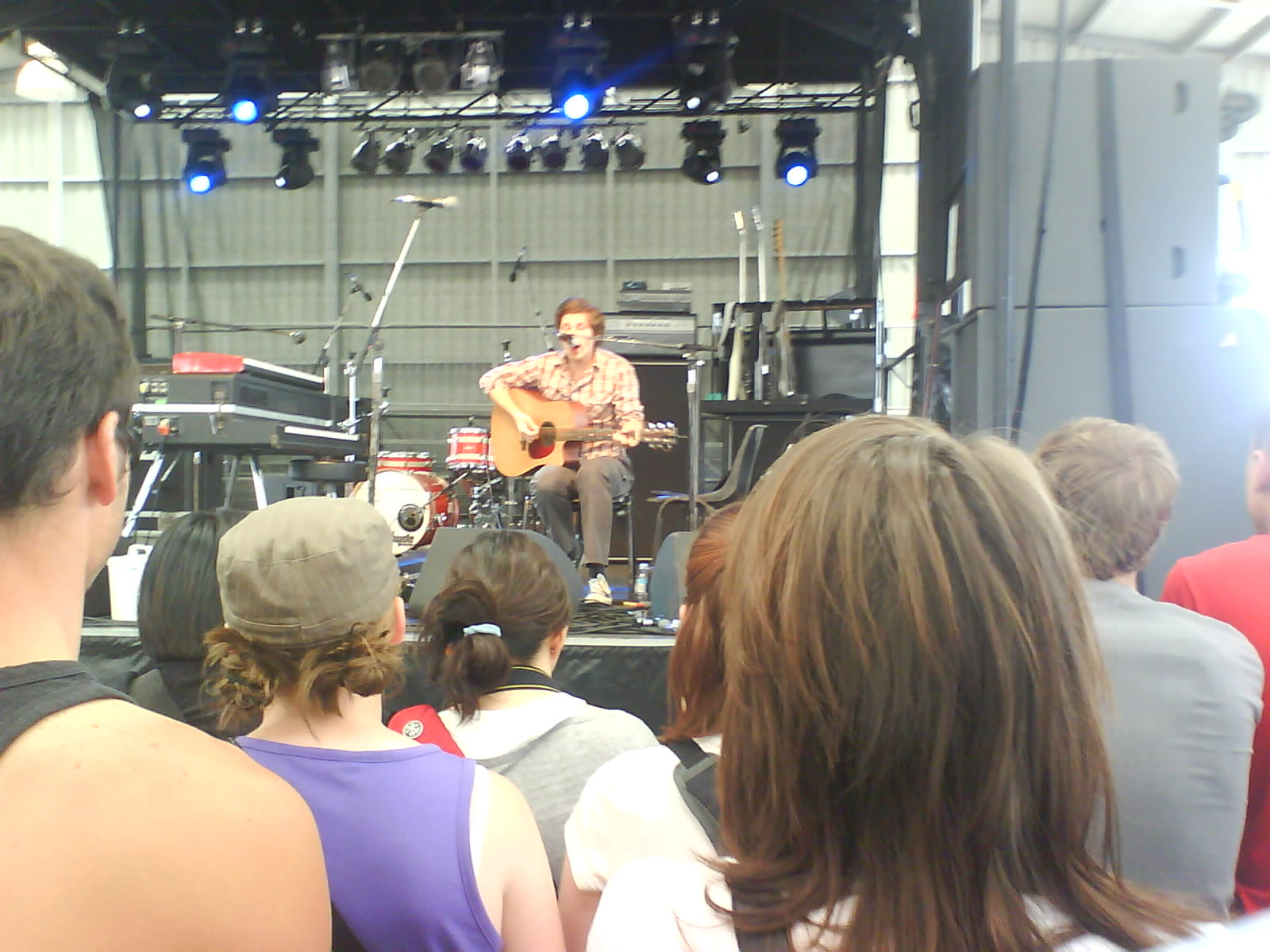
Enders performing at Australian music festival, Soundwave, in Melbourne, 2009.

Ace Enders announced in Alternative Press magazine that he planned on recording a solo album, and began a new project named Ace Enders and a Million Different People.

In the summer of 2007, Enders took out a loan to build a studio in the basement of a shopping center. After three weeks of work, building finished and Pink Space Recording was created. After the studio was finished, Enders spent two straight days making demos that would later be named "From a Daze" and "Emergency". Enders signed on with manager Lucas Keller to work on Ace Enders and a Million Different People. In February and March 2008, he supported Angels & Airwaves on their headlining US tour. On June 13 of that year, Enders put out an 8-track album called The Secret Wars available for free download on Fuse TV. He recorded them in his own studio. In October and November 2008, Enders supported Hellogoodbye on their headlining US tour.

In December 2008, Ace Enders and a Million Different People released the single "Bitter Sweet Symphony", a cover of The Verve song, on the iTunes Store. The song involves multiple artists including Mark Hoppus, Aaron Marsh, Craig Owens, Alex Gaskarth of All Time Low, Bryce Avary, Kenny Vasoli, Matt Thiessen, and Duane Okun. All of the proceeds from the song went to VH1's Save the Music Foundation.

In February and March 2009, Enders toured Australia as part of the Soundwave festival. Ace Enders and a Million Different People released its second album, Enders' third solo album, on March 17, 2009, through Vagrant/Drive-Thru Records. The album is titled When I Hit the Ground.

Ace Enders and a Million Different People went on tour with The All-American Rejects on the I Wanna Rock Tour starting in early April 2009. In May 2009, the band performed at The Bamboozle festival.

=== Return to I Can Make A Mess Like Nobody's Business ===
Enders released his second album under the I Can Make a Mess Like Nobody's Business name on March 23, 2010, entitled The World We Know. A music video was made for the song "Old Man...........................".

On September 16, Enders released the third Mess album Dust'n Off the Ol' Guitar. The album featured redone versions of many Early November songs, as well as a couple Ace Enders & A Million Different People songs. The album also featured a new song titled "Growing Pains". There's also three songs from the album that will be released once the sales reach 5,000. These songs include "Pretty Pretty", a remix of "1000 Times A Day", and a full-length version of "Decoration".

On December 15, Enders released a Christmas-oriented EP titled Happy Christmas. The EP contains one original song titled "Season's Greetings", as well as a cover of "Christmastime Is Here" from the film A Charlie Brown Christmas, and a cover of Charles Brown hit Please Come Home For Christmas. The EP was released Digitally.

Enders released self-released the fourth "I Can Make a Mess Like Nobody's Business" album, Gold Rush on May 5, 2011. This album was funded through fan donations through Kickstarter.

With The Early November reuniting and touring again, Enders has continued to release to support this project. Along with The Early November, the band was signed to Rise Records. In 2013, the band name has been shortened to "I Can Make a Mess". This can be seen on both the latest album Enola, release on June 11, 2013, and the warped tour ballot. Enders performed two shows a day, on the entire 2013 warped tour, as The Early November and I Can Make a Mess.

== Other projects ==
Ace Enders runs a studio in his home town of Hammonton, NJ named The Lumberyard. Ace has produced, engineered, and mixed bands such as Backseat Goodbye, Move Out West, and perhaps most notably, Aaron West and the Roaring Twenties. The side project of longtime friend and collaborator Dan Campbell of The Wonder Years, Enders has produced and engineered several Aaron West releases in addition to performing instruments such as guitar, bass, banjo, and lap steel for them.

== Personal life ==
Ace married his longtime girlfriend Jenn Rock in May 2006. They have two children, Arthur "Ace" Carl Enders IV (born September 10, 2009) and Ivy Cynthia Enders (born October 25, 2011).

== Discography ==
=== The Early November ===
==== Albums ====
- The Room's Too Cold (2003) US #107
- The Mother, the Mechanic, and the Path (2006) US #31
- In Currents (2012) #43
- Imbue (2015)
- Fifteen Years (2017)
- Lilac (2019)
- Twenty (2022)
- The Early November (2024)

==== Extended plays ====
- The 5 Song EP (2001)
- So is This Fun? (2002)
- For All of This (2002)
- The Acoustic EP (2002)
- The Early November/I Am the Avalanche (2005)

=== I Can Make a Mess Like Nobody's Business ===
- I Can Make a Mess Like Nobody's Business (2004)
- Their cover of the song "Positively 4th Street" appears on Listen to Bob Dylan: A Tribute (2005), a tribute album.
- The World We Know (March 23, 2010)
- Dust'n Off The Ol' Guitar (September 16, 2010)
- Happy Christmas (December 15, 2010)
- Gold Rush (May 5, 2011)
- Enola (June 11, 2013)
- Growing In (October 9, 2014)

=== Ace Enders and a Million Different People ===
==== Studio albums ====
- The Secret Wars (2008)
- When I Hit the Ground (2009)

==== Extended plays ====
- The Australian EP (2009)

=== Ace Enders ===
==== Albums ====
- Hiraeth (September 2, 2015)

==== Extended plays ====
- Share With Everyone EP (2012)

==== Unreleased ====
- The Lost Album (2008)

=== Clear eyes Fanzine ===
- Season One, Episodes 1-6 (2018)

=== Other work ===
==== Featured in ====
- "Please Me" by Car Party
- "These Are The Days" by Just Left
- "On My Own" by Just Surrender
- "The Place You Love" by Have Mercy
- "Heaven Sent" by Front Porch Step
