= When I Hit the Ground =

Studio album by Ace Enders and a Million Different People
- Released: March 17, 2009
- Genre: Emo-pop; alternative rock
- Length: 51:42
- Label: Vagrant
- Producer: Chris Badami

Ace Enders and a Million Different People chronology
Australia EP (2009)	When I Hit the Ground (2009)

When I Hit the Ground is the second studio album by American rock musician Ace Enders, using the name Ace Enders and a Million Different People. The album was released on March 17, 2009, through Vagrant Records, and it peaked at number 15 on the Top Heatseekers chart and number 44 on the Top Independent Albums chart.

== Reception ==
Professional ratings
Review scores
Source	Rating
AbsolutePunk	(46%)
Alternative Press	4/5 stars

AllMusic's Andrew Leahey called the album "a confident, commercial release that tempers [Ender's] ambitious emo-pop experiments with a dose of '90s alternative rock."

== Track listing ==
1. "Reintroduction" – 2:24
2. "Take the Money and Run" – 3:24
3. "New Guitar" – 1:04
4. "The Only Thing I Have (The Sign)" – 3:26
5. "When I Hit the Ground" – 4:02
6. "Reaction" – 4:02
7. "Sweeter Light" – 4:19
8. "S.O.S." – 2:55
9. "Over This" – 3:33
10. "Where Do We Go From Here" – 5:34
11. "Emergency" – 4:17
12. "Leader" – 4:37
13. "Bring Back Love" – 4:28
14. "Can't Run Away" – 3:37
15. "From a Daze" (B-side) – 3:40
- The title track "When I Hit The Ground" has an acoustic rendition on the album "Dustin' Off the Ol' Guitar" by Ender's band I Can Make A Mess Like Nobody's Business.
