= Gold Rush (album) =

Studio album by I Can Make a Mess Like Nobody's Business
- Released: May 05, 2011
- Recorded: 2010
- Genre: Acoustic
- Length: 34:57
- Producer: Ace Enders

I Can Make a Mess Like Nobody's Business chronology
Happy Christmas (2010)	Gold Rush (2011)	Enola (2013)

Gold Rush is I Can Make a Mess Like Nobody's Business' third full-length studio album. The album was released independently without a label by Ace Enders.

Enders was able to fund Gold Rush by accepting donations from his fans. Approximately 50 songs were written for the album. After deciding which tracks to record for the album, Enders recorded and mastered the album in less than two weeks.

== Track listing ==
1. "Gold Rush" — 4:30
2. "Lame Duck" — 3:30
3. "Connected" — 3:44
4. "Complications" — 3:52
5. "Had to Be There" — 3:37
6. "Don't Leave Me" — 4:16
7. "Misery" — 3:31
8. "Gods" — 3:10
9. "Train Stop" — 4:47
- "Connected" and "Gods" (originally titled "We are Gods") were originally released through Enders' other solo project Ace Enders and A Million Different People via MySpace.
