= A War You Cannot Win =

Studio album by All That Remains
- Released: November 6, 2012
- Recorded: 2012
- Studios: Zing Studios, Westfield, Massachusetts
- Genre: Heavy metal
- Length: 39:19
- Label: Razor & Tie
- Producer: Adam Dutkiewicz

All That Remains chronology
| For We Are Many (2010) | A War You Cannot Win (2012) | The Order of Things (2015) |

Singles from A War You Cannot Win
- 1. "Down Through the Ages" Released: August 13, 2012; 2. "Stand Up" Released: August 27, 2012; 3. "You Can't Fill My Shadow" Released: October 26, 2012; 4. "Asking Too Much" Released: March 18, 2013; 5. "What If I Was Nothing" Released: September 4, 2013

A War You Cannot Win is the sixth studio album by the American heavy metal band All That Remains. The album was released on November 6, 2012, through Razor & Tie.

The album has some tracks which have a melodic metalcore sound and some with a standard metal sound which have only singing.

Album sold over 25,000 copies in the United States in its first week of release to land at position No. 13 on The Billboard 200 chart. As of February 2015, the album has sold 123,000 copies in the United States.

== Background and recording ==
The album was produced by Killswitch Engage guitarist Adam Dutkiewicz, who has produced albums for the band in the past. The lineup stayed the same as there previous 2010 release For We Are Many.

The writing phase began soon after their 18-month tour in support of their prior album For We Are Many. The group noted that songwriting matured over time; the process wasn’t overly complicated or formulaic with them basically writing the first batch of songs (10-12) they felt good about and used those. Labonte stated in an interview with Blabbermouth.net "We really busted our asses and tried to do some new stuff.”

Guitarist Oli Herbert composed most of the material for the album drummer. Jason Costa commented on the recording process in an interview shortly following the album’s release stating:

He’ll [Herbert] then come to the band with some semblance of a song,” the sticksman explains. It might be a whole song, half a song, or parts of a song like a verse or a chorus. He gets together with all of us, shows us the different parts, and we all sort of work on it. We hammer at it like an anvil. We talk about which riffs should be used for what, and Phil (Labonte, vocals) will see which ones he would rather sing or scream over. Oli then might say ‘This is the bridge, and maybe I’ll wanna do a guitar solo after it or before it.’ I try a whole slew of different drum beats for different parts, and we all figure out together what works better. We all bring stuff in, but Oli has most of the ideas for songs. Mike (Martin, rhythm guitars) and Phil also write – Phil also plays guitar, so he does some of the writing too.

== Musical style ==
Drummer Jason Costa stated about the album: "This is a very guitar, very melody-oriented album. It wasn't very rhythm-based at all. I would just say it's metal; it's a metal album. We've got some heavy songs on there, some heavy, groovy songs on there. We've got some fast, heavy songs on there, we've got some more radio-friendly, melodic songs on there. It's typical ALL THAT REMAINS, really, but we've definitely stepped up the musicianship there and the writing." The vocals are a balance between clean and harsh.

The album features a mixture of ballads and heavy metal. Blabbermouth.net wrote "You Can't Fill My Shadow", "Just Moments in Time", "Sing For Liberty" and the band's throwdown segment cast as much against their critics as a bewildered generation looking for a shout of empowerment, "A Call to All Non-Believers". These songs are frequently fast but, no surprise, frequently skidded by breakdowns and heart-whumping choruses."

Many of the album's lyrics touch upon fighting against overwhelming forces whether they’re societal systems, corrupt powers, or internal struggles. Many songs pair dark subject matter with messages of perseverance, growth, and hope urging listeners to keep fighting “wars” even when victory seems out of reach.

The album was viewed as the band's shift to a more radio friendly sound. In Loudwire’s review they commented on the album's "more mainstream hard rock direction" and highlights tracks like "What If I Was Nothing" as clear attempts to reach rock radio. Which ultimately worked as the song and other singles from the a received heavy play time on the mainstream rock radio stations.

== Release and promotion ==
The first song to be released from the album was "Down Through the Ages". The song was first posted to Labonte's YouTube channel on August 13, 2012. The second single "Stand Up" was released as the next single on August 27 and became one of the band most successful radio hits and reached number one on the Mainstream Rock chart a music video was later made for the song. On October 26, a third single "You Can't Fill My Shadow" was released. However the fifth and last single, "What If I Was Nothing", was the greatest hit of the album and of their whole discography. It is a power ballad which has already reached 97 million views in YouTube. In this song Philip Labonte sings about some of his former problems with his wife. it peaked at number two on the Mainstream Rock Tracks chart and at number 3 on the Modern Rock Tracks chart.

The album was officially released on November 6, 2012 and went to sell over 25,000 copies in the United States in its first week of release to land at position No. 13 on The Billboard 200 chart, it reached even higher on the Canadian albums chart peaking at number 12.

Following the album’s release All That Remains went on a North American tour in support of the album with Dethklok Machine Head, alongside special guests The Black Dahlia Murder. The tour went from October 30, to December 8.

== Reception ==
Professional ratings
Review scores
| Source | Rating |
|---|---|
| AllMusic | 3.5/5 stars |
| Artist Direct | 5/5 stars |
| Loudwire | 3.5/5 stars |
| Ultimate Guitar | 6.7/10 |
| Blabbermouth.net | 7/10 stars |
| Metal Forces Magazine | 7/10 stars |
| Metal Hammer | 2.5/5 stars |
| Ultimate Guitar | 7.7 |

The album was met with generally positive reviews, Rick Florino writing for Artists Direct gave the album a perfect score stating “Every element has been enhanced here from the vocals to the solos. In essence, it's the perfect hard rock, metal, or whatever-you-want-to-call-it heavy record. A War You Cannot Win sees All That Remains emerge victorious as leaders of the new guard with one of the best albums of 2012.” Chad Bowar writing for Loudwire gave the album a positive review stating “A War You Cannot Win’ is packed with catchy singles and a polished production from Killswitch Engage’s Adam D. that will appeal to the mainstream. There’s also an ample supply of aggression and heaviness to satisfy metalheads. The combination should make it a very successful album.“ He did add “By the last third of the album, there are a few misses.”

Cryptic Rock gave the album a 3/5 claiming "If you are a fan of heavier metal versus the melodic, A War You Cannot Win is a perfect balance of both done just right to quench your metal lust. Phillip Labonte does not disappoint his fans with his performance here. If you like harsh vocals mixed with a little bit of clean, this album is for you." Holly Wright of Metal Hammer was critical of the album stating "There are some highlights; You Can’t Fill My Shadow, is both tight and atmospheric, Stand Up’s air-punching power. Choppy riffs occasionally bolster the momentum but the album is mostly chaff that borders on teen fan fodder." A reviewer from Ultimate Guitar credited the instrumentation adding "It seems like they have found their sound and sticked with it, in my opinion, it works. Memorable riffs, memorable choruses and well placed breakdowns make the album what it is."

Gregory Heaney of AllMusic praised the band's change in style stating "What makes All That Remains special is that they've managed to make not having a niche their specialty, a rarity in a genre as stratified as heavy metal. As confident as ever, the band smoothly shifts from the driving, metalcore thrash of opening tracks "Down Thru the Ages" and You Can't Fill My Shadow" into the more anthemic, arena ready-rock of "Stand Up" without missing a beat."

Despite the generally favorable reviews and radio success the album seen, as time has gone on lead singer Phil Labonte his been critical of the album claiming it "sucked". In a 2014 interview with Revolver he stated "It was mostly me. I think I could have done better. I could have had stuff that was a little more compelling -- especially in some of the heavier songs. So I wasn't super-pumped about it."

== Track listing ==
| No. | Title | Writer(s) | Length |
|---|---|---|---|
| 1. | "Down Through the Ages" | Philip Labonte | 3:31 |
| 2. | "You Can't Fill My Shadow" | Philip Labonte | 3:33 |
| 3. | "Stand Up" | Johnny Andrews / Rob Graves / All That Remains | 4:00 |
| 4. | "A Call to All Non-Believers" | Philip Labonte | 2:44 |
| 5. | "Asking Too Much" | Rob Graves / All That Remains | 3:28 |
| 6. | "Intro" | Philip Labonte | 0:21 |
| 7. | "Just Moments in Time" | Philip Labonte | 3:27 |
| 8. | "What If I Was Nothing" | Rob Graves / All That Remains | 4:36 |
| 9. | "Sing for Liberty" | Philip Labonte | 3:41 |
| 10. | "Not Fading" | Rob Graves / All That Remains | 3:34 |
| 11. | "Calculating Loneliness" (Instrumental) | Oli Herbert | 2:39 |
| 12. | "A War You Cannot Win" | Rob Graves / All That Remains | 3:45 |
| Total length: | | | 39:19 |

Japanese edition bonus track
| No. | Title | Length |
|---|---|---|
| 13. | "Let Nothing Bind Me" | 3:03 |
| Total length: | | 42:22 |

== Personnel ==
All That Remains

- Philip Labonte – lead vocals
- Oli Herbert – lead guitar
- Mike Martin – rhythm guitar
- Jeanne Sagan – bass guitar, backing vocals
- Jason Costa – drums

Production

- Adam Dutkiewicz – production, engineering
- Jim Fogarty – assistant engineering
- Brian Virtue – mixing at Modernist Movement Studios, Nashville, Tennessee
- Brad Blackwood – mastering at Euphonic Masters

Management

- Stephen Hutton and Bert Landry for Uppercut Management
- Josh Kline – booking for The Agency Group
- Murray Richman and Nathan Richman – business management for Richman Business Management
- Mike McKoy – legal representation for Serling, Rooks, Ferrara, McKoy & Worob LLP
- Beau King – production, concert lighting and tour management
- Pete Giberga – A&R
- John Franck – marketing direction

Artwork

- P.R. Brown – photography and design

== Charts ==
| Chart (2012) | Peak position |
|---|---|
| Canadian Albums (Billboard) | 12 |
| Japanese Albums (Oricon) | 84 |
| US Billboard 200 | 13 |
| US Digital Albums (Billboard) | 12 |
| US Top Hard Rock Albums (Billboard) | 2 |
| US Independent Albums (Billboard) | 3 |
| US Top Rock Albums (Billboard) | 4 |
| US Indie Store Album Sales (Billboard) | 11 |
