= Growing In =

Studio album by I Can Make a Mess
- Released: October 9, 2014
- Recorded: 2014
- Genre: Acoustic
- Length: 34:24
- Label: Independent
- Producer: Ace Enders

I Can Make a Mess chronology
Enola (2013)	Growing In (2014)

Growing In is I Can Make a Mess's fifth full-length studio album. The album was released independently. This is the second album in which the band has gone by the name I Can Make a Mess instead of the original I Can Make a Mess Like Nobody's Business. According to Enders’ Facebook, each song was written in 3–4 minutes sessions of whatever came to his head first in regard to the music and lyrics. You can hear the voice memo from his phone of the initial recordings spread throughout the tracks.

== Track listing ==
1. "Caterpillar" — 3:27
2. "Get Normal" — 3:27
3. "Keep Moving" — 4:16
4. "Undecided" — 3:13
5. "Back Whoas of Lavish Glass" — 3:02
6. "I'm the Man (Sarcasm)" — 3:18
7. "Call Me Everything" — 2:04
8. "Chartreuse" — 3:05
9. "Deciduous" — 3:05
10. "I Love My Wife" — 2:45
11. "Growing Into What You'll Grow Out Of" — 2:42
