= The Room's Too Cold =

Studio album by The Early November
- Released: October 7, 2003
- Studio: Portrait Recording, Lincoln Park, New Jersey
- Genre: Emo, alternative rock, pop punk
- Length: 46:40
- Label: Drive-Thru
- Producer: Chris Badami, Arthur Enders

The Early November chronology
For All of This (2002)	The Room's Too Cold (2003)	The Acoustic EP (2005)

Professional ratings
Review scores
Source	Rating
AllMusic	4/5 stars
CMJ New Music Monthly	Favorable
The Mag	7/10 stars
Melodic	2/5 stars

The Room's Too Cold is the debut studio album by the American rock band The Early November, released on October 7, 2003, through Drive-Thru Records.

Combining elements of emo and pop punk, that album's material is considered to represent scene music by publications such as Alternative Press.

== Background and recording ==
The Room's Too Cold was produced by Chris Badami and co-produced by frontman Arthur 'Ace' Enders and was recorded at Portrait Recording Studio in Lincoln Park, New Jersey. Badami also acted as engineer, with assistance from Michelle Dispenziere; Badami mixed the tracks before the album was mastered by Alan Douches at West West Side Music in New York City. The band recorded 17 songs in total for the album, with 11 songs making the final cut. Enders and Badami met with David Rimelis to arrange a string part for "Ever So Sweet".

The album features a guest appearance from Kenny Vasoli of The Starting Line, who was also signed to Drive-Thru at the time.

== Release ==
Between late August and October 2003, the group performed on the Drive-Thru Records 2003 Invasion Tour. The Room's Too Cold was released on October 7. In January 2004, the band went on a tour of the UK, with Allister, Home Grown, Hidden in Plain View, and Yourcodenameis:milo. In March 2004, the group went on a headlining US tour with support from Limbeck, Spitalfield and Hey Mercedes. A music video was filmed for "Something That Produces Results" in April 2004. In April and May 2004, the band supported Less Than Jake on their tour of North America, and performed at the Skate and Surf Festival. They went on a brief East Coast tour with A Thorn for Every Heart, Engine Down and Days Away at the start of 2005. In February 2005, the group supported Sugarcult on the US Take Action Tour. In late 2013, the album was repressed on vinyl through Rise Records. In addition, the group performed it in its entirety in December of the same year.

== Reception ==
Johnny Loftus of Allmusic gave the album a highly positive review.

The album peaked at number 107 on US Billboard 200.

== Track listing ==
All lyrics written by Arthur Enders, except one line in "Baby Blue" by Matt Pryor, all songs written by the Early November.

No.	Title	Length
1.	"Ever So Sweet"	4:19
2.	"Something That Produces Results"	2:43
3.	"The Mountain Range in My Living Room"	4:11
4.	"Sesame, Smeshame"	4:15
5.	"Baby Blue"	3:42
6.	"The Course of Human Life"	5:26
7.	"Dinner at the Money Table"	3:57
8.	"Exchanging Two Hundred"	4:27
9.	"My Sleep Pattern Changed"	3:37
10.	"Fluxy"	3:29
11.	"Everything's Too Cold ... But You're So Hot"	6:34
Total length:		46:40

Notes

- "Something That Produces Results" & "Baby Blue" both have an acoustic renditions on Aces band I Can Make A Mess Like Nobody's Business acoustic album "Dust'n Off the Ol" Gee-Tar."
- The line "I don't want you to love me anymore" on the track "Baby Blue" is taken directly from a The Get Up Kids song "No Love" on their debut album Four Minute Mile.
- The singles were The Mountain Range in My Living Room and Something That Produces Results

== Personnel ==
Personnel per booklet.

The Early November

- Arthur Enders – vocals, guitar, percussion, samples, keyboards
- Sergio Anello – bass guitar, percussion
- Jeff Kummer – drums, percussion
- Joseph Marro – guitar, Rhodes piano, keyboards, vibraphone

Additional musicians

- David Rimelis – string arrangements
- The Madison String Quartet – strings
  - Evelyn Estavaof – violin
  - Elizabeth Schulze – viola
  - Gerall Hieser – cello
- Kenny Vasoli – additional vocals (track 10)

Production and design

- Chris Badami – producer, engineer, mixing
- Arthur Enders – producer
- Michelle Dispenziere – assistant engineer
- Alan Douches – mastering
- Asterik Studio – art direction, design
- The Early November – art direction
- Jeff Gross – photography
- Dennis Kleiman – band photography

== Charts ==
Album

Chart (2003)	Peak position
US Billboard 200	107
Top Heatseekers Albums	1
