= Imbue =

Studio album by The Early November
- Released: May 12, 2015
- Studio: The Living Room Recording, Hammonton, New Jersey
- Genre: Alternative rock, emo, pop-punk
- Length: 40:20
- Label: Rise
- Producer: Ace Enders

The Early November chronology
| In Currents (2012) | Imbue (2015) | Fifteen Years (2017) |

Professional ratings
Aggregate scores
| Source | Rating |
|---|---|
| Metacritic | 82/100 |
Review scores
| Source | Rating |
| Punknews.org | 3/5 stars |
| Sputnikmusic | 4/5 |

Imbue is the fourth studio album by The Early November.

== Release ==
On March 10, 2015, "Narrow Mouth" was premiered through Billboard's website. A music video was released for "Better This Way" on April 30. It was filmed during a show where the group had debuted the track. In April and May, the group went on a tour of the UK and Europe with support from You Blew It! and A Great Big Pile of Leaves. Imbue was released on May 12 through Rise Records. Following this, the group embarked on a US tour which lasted until June. They were supported by Lydia and Restorations. On May 17, a music video was released for "Boxing Timelines". In August and September, the group went on tour with Bayside and Better Off. On June 14, 2016, a music video was released for "Narrow Mouth".

== Track listing ==
| No. | Title | Length |
|---|---|---|
| 1. | "Narrow Mouth" | 4:31 |
| 2. | "Better This Way" | 3:31 |
| 3. | "Magnolia" | 3:33 |
| 4. | "The Negatives" | 4:16 |
| 5. | "Boxing Timelines" | 4:34 |
| 6. | "Circulation" | 4:38 |
| 7. | "Harmony" | 3:41 |
| 8. | "Cyanide" | 3:37 |
| 9. | "I Don't Care" | 4:15 |
| 10. | "Nothing Lasts Forever" | 3:44 |
| Total length: | | 40:20 |

Hidden track
| No. | Title | Length |
|---|---|---|
| 11. | "Digital Age" | 4:04 |

== Personnel ==
- Arthur "Ace" Enders – vocals, rhythm guitar
- Jeff Kummer – drums
- Joseph Marro – guitar, keyboard, piano
- Bill Lugg – lead guitar
- Sergio Anello – bass

Photography – Danielle Parsons

== Charts ==
| Chart (2015) | Peak position |
|---|---|
| US Top Current Albums (Billboard) | 87 |
| US Independent Albums (Billboard) | 16 |
| US Top Alternative Albums (Billboard) | 17 |
| US Top Rock Albums (Billboard) | 22 |
