= Lilac (The Early November album) =

2019 album by The Early November

Studio album by The Early November
- Released: September 27, 2019
- Recorded: 2016–2019
- Studio: LumberYard Recording Studio, Hammonton, New Jersey
- Length: 38:09
- Label: Rise Records
- Producer: Ace Enders

The Early November chronology
Fifteen Years (2017)	Lilac (2019)	Twenty (2022)

Professional ratings
Review scores
Source	Rating
Sputnikmusic	3.4/5

Lilac is the fifth studio album by American rock band The Early November, released on September 27, 2019 through Rise Records.

== Release ==
Originally scheduled for a fall 2018 release, it was announced on November 18, 2018 that the album was being pushed back to some time in 2019. After being pushed back several times, the final release date was September 27, 2019. According to singer Ace Enders, songs from this album were written starting in 2016, but the original version “wasn’t the right album”.

== Reception ==
A staff writer for Sputnikmusic gave the album a positive review, while lamenting the delays in its release and calling it "a confused and confusing piece of work which pulls itself (and the listener) in disparate directions." The review praised the album's opening and closing songs in particular, but argued that the album does not quite live up to previous entries.

== Track listing ==
All songs written by Ace Enders.

1. "Perfect Sphere (Bubble)" - 03:25
2. "My Weakness" - 03:40
3. "Ave Maria" - 03:12
4. "Hit by a Car (In Euphoria)" - 03:36
5. "Comatose" - 03:29
6. "Fame" - 03:18
7. "You Own My Mind" - 03:48
8. "I Dissolve" - 03:08
9. "Make My Bed" - 03:14
10. "Our Choice" - 03:54
11. "The Lilac" - 03:25

== Personnel ==
- Arthur "Ace" Enders – vocals, rhythm guitar
- Jeff Kummer – drums
- Joseph Marro – guitar, keyboard, piano
- Bill Lugg – lead guitar
- Sergio Anello – bass

== Charts ==
Chart (2019)	Peak position
US Independent Albums (Billboard)	47
