= What Became of Me =

What Became Of Me

Studio album by Roses Are Red
- Released: 2006
- Genre: Alternative rock
- Length: 44:48
- Label: Trustkill Records
- Producer: Brian McTernan

Roses Are Red chronology
Conversations (2004)	What Became Of Me (2006)

What Became Of Me is the third and final studio album by American rock band Roses Are Red.

== Track listing ==
1. "These Days" (3:47)
2. "Failing" (3:14)
3. "Giving It All Tonight" (3:47)
4. "Show Your Eyes" (3:56)
5. "The Last Time (Come With Me Tonight)" (4:13)
6. "Bring Me Down" (3:55)
7. "Remember Me (It's Happening)" (4:02)
8. "Running Out Of Time" (3:33)
9. "Just Say The Words" (4:23)
10. "What Became Of Me" (4:41)
11. "Where I've Been" (3:53)

=== B-Sides ===
- "We Never Knew" (featured on the Trustkill Takeover Vol. II compilation)

== Personnel ==
- Vincent Minervino - vocals/piano
- Michael Lasaponara - drums
- Kevin Mahoney - bass guitar
- Shaun Murphy - guitar
- Tom Zenns - guitar
