= For We Are Many =

Studio album by All That Remains
- Released: October 12, 2010
- Recorded: 2009–2010
- Studio: Zing Studios, Westfield, Massachusetts
- Genre: Melodic metalcore
- Length: 40:37
- Label: Prosthetic; Razor & Tie
- Producer: Adam Dutkiewicz; Rob Graves

All That Remains chronology
Overcome (2008)	For We Are Many (2010)	A War You Cannot Win (2012)

Singles from For We Are Many
- 1. "Hold On" Released: September 14, 2010; 2. "The Last Time" Released: April 1, 2011; 3. "The Waiting One" Released: October 31, 2011

For We Are Many (stylized as ...For We Are Many) is the fifth studio album by the American heavy metal band All That Remains.

Released on October 12, 2010, it is the third album by the band to be produced by the Killswitch Engage guitarist, Adam Dutkiewicz, who also produced This Darkened Heart and The Fall of Ideals.

== Background ==
For We Are Many is the first All That Remains album to contain the same lineup as the preceding album, a tradition that would continue up through 2015's The Order of Things.

In an interview lead singer Phil Labonte stated that it was the first time he had an idea for the album cover before they started working on it. Stating "I wanted it to be heavy and let the art speak for itself. That was part of the reason for leaving the name of the band off the cover."

== Music style ==
The album features fast tempos, riffs, tremolo picking, guitar soloing, growled vocals, and breakdowns. It leans into both melodeath (melodic death metal) and metalcore. Many tracks alternate between shouting/screaming vocals and cleaner, melodic choruses that reflect more introspection or vulnerability.

In an interview with Revolver Labonte stated “For We Are Many" will also offer a few surprises. "There's a song with a talk box on it and a couple of cool riffs that remind me of MESHUGGAH," “there's more PANTERA-ish, southern stuff than we've ever done.”

The album lyrics focus on coming together and defying oppressors the title track For We Are Many emphasizes this. The lyrics also touch upon internal conflict and a struggle to believe in oneself or keep faith.

== Release and promotion ==
On August 18, 2010, the band made the title track downloadable for free. On September 2, the band released the first single to go to rock radio, "Hold On", on their official YouTube channel it peaked at number 10 on the Mainstream Rock chart The music video was released on October 6.

For We Are Many was released on October 12, 2010 and is one All That Remains most successful albums commercially, it sold 29,000 copies in its first week leading to it cracking the top 10 on the U.S. Billboard 200, peaking at number 10 it is the highest the band has ever charted on the mainstream U.S. billboard. On top this it also the band’s highest charting album on the Canadian Albums Chart, where it also broke into the top 10 peaking at number 7. Along with this it was their first album to top the Hard Rock Albums Billboard peaking at number 1, it is also their highest charting album on the U.S Top Rock Albums Billboard peaking at number 2. The album also reached number 91 in Japan.

"The Last Time" music video was released on April 1 2011, the song peaked at number 8 on the US mainstream rock chart. "The Waiting One" reached the highest on the mainstream rock chart peaking at number 7.

== Reception ==
Professional ratings
Aggregate scores
Source	Rating
Metacritic	70
Review scores
Source	Rating
AllMusic	3/5 stars
About.com	3.5/5 stars
PopMatters	7/10 stars
Rocksound	7/10 stars
Blabbermouth.net	7/10 stars
Lambgoat	5/10

For We Are Many received an 70% on Metacritc indicating generally positive reviews. AllMusic gave the album 3 out of 5 stars, stating that it "feels like a throwback to the NWOBHM at times evoking hints of Iron Maiden and Judas Priest." They also stated that the album had a good mix of "heaviness and harmony". Blabbermouth.net gave it a 7/10 stating “A logical extension of its predecessor, "…For We Are Many" uses a formula very similar to that heard on "Overcome". The scream/sing/scream vocals are commonplace throughout the disc's twelve tracks and there seems to be one of those rhythmic "chuga-chuga" riffs around every corner. Yes, it seems that ALL THAT REMAINS knew better than to mess with a good thing, but this isn't really a case of playing things safe either. Shawn of Lambgoat gave the album a 5/10 stating "While the title track, which sounds like it could have been a Behind Silence And Solitude b-side, might give you some early hope, it isn't long before All That Remains falls into the same traps that have made their last couple records mediocre."

== Track listing ==
All lyrics are written by Philip Labonte; all music is composed by All That Remains, except where noted.

No.	Title	Music	Length
1.	"Now Let Them Tremble..."		1:23
2.	"For We Are Many"		2:59
3.	"The Last Time"	All That Remains; Rob Graves	3:58
4.	"Some of the People, All of the Time"		3:22
5.	"Won't Go Quietly"		4:00
6.	"Aggressive Opposition"		3:45
7.	"From the Outside"		3:34
8.	"Dead Wrong"		3:07
9.	"Faithless"		3:34
10.	"Hold On"	All That Remains; Graves	2:57
11.	"Keepers of Fellow Man"		3:10
12.	"The Waiting One"	All That Remains; Graves	4:48
Total length:			40:37

Bonus tracks
No.	Title	Music	Length
13.	"Of the Deep" (U.S. iTunes pre-order/international bonus track)		2:49
14.	"Hold On" (Radio Version, Japanese edition bonus track)	All That Remains; Graves	3:05
Total length:			46:36

== Personnel ==
All That Remains

- Philip Labonte – Vocals
- Oli Herbert – Lead Guitar
- Mike Martin – Guitar
- Jeanne Sagan – Bass
- Jason Costa – Drums

Credits adapted from the official release of this LP Production

- Adam Dutkiewicz – producer, engineering, mixing at Wicked Good Recording Studios, original production
- Jim Fogarty – assistant engineering
- Brian Virtue – additional production
- Rob Graves – additional production
- Ryan Smith – mastering at Sterling Sound, New York City

Artwork

- Travis Smith – artwork design

== Charts ==
Chart (2010)	Peak position
Canadian Albums (Billboard)	7
Japanese Albums (Oricon)	91
US Billboard 200	10
US Digital Albums (Billboard)	8
US Top Hard Rock Albums (Billboard)	1
US Top Rock Albums (Billboard)	2
US Indie Store Album Sales (Billboard)	12
