= The Acoustic EP (The Early November EP) =

EP by The Early November
- Released: 2003
- Studio: Portrait Recording Studios, Pompton Plains, New Jersey
- Genre: Emo. indie rock, acoustic rock
- Length: 22:40
- Label: Drive-Thru Records
- Producer: Chris Badami

The Early November chronology
The Room's Too Cold (2003)	The Acoustic EP (2003)	The Early November / I Am the Avalanche (2005)

The Acoustic EP is the second EP from The Early November, recorded shortly before the band's first full-length CD and released in 2003.

== Track listing ==
(all songs written by Arthur Enders)

1. "Ever So Sweet" – 4:15
2. "I Want to Hear You Sad" – 3:24
3. "All We Ever Needed" – 2:27
4. "Sunday Drive" – 3:46
5. "Come Back" – 2:47
6. "Make It Happen" – 3:21
7. "Every Night's Another Story" – 2:40

== Credits ==
- Arthur 'Ace' Enders – vocals, guitar
