= The World We Know (Ace Enders album) =

Studio album by I Can Make a Mess Like Nobody's Business
- Released: March 23, 2010
- Recorded: 2009
- Genre: Acoustic
- Label: Self-Released

I Can Make a Mess Like Nobody's Business chronology
I Can Make a Mess Like Nobody's Business (2004)	The World We Know (2010)	Dust'n Off The Ol' Guitar (2010)

The World We Know is the second studio album by Ace Enders, the second using the name I Can Make a Mess Like Nobody's Business. It was released on March 23, 2010.

The track listing was announced by Alternative Press on March 11, 2010. I Can Make a Mess Like Nobody's Business went on tour with Copeland to support the release of the album, which is said to actually be one continuous song. Enders says, "I certainly have no problem with people buying songs instead of albums. But with this project, much like the last Mess record, I want it to be about the experience."

== Track listing ==
1. "Sleep Means Sleeping" – 4:37
2. "My Hands Hurt" — 1:26
3. "Old Man..........................." – 5:52
4. "You're Not So Good at Talking Anymore" – 3:55
5. "Rosary" – 4:17
6. "No Idea Where I'm Going" – 1:35
7. "Stop Smoking Because It's Not Good for You" – 4:24
8. "100 Dollar Bills" – 3:19
9. "Baby Steps" – 3:17
10. "Light Voices Long Rides" – 2:11
11. "Telling Me Goodbye" – 5:13

Amazon MP3 bonus track

1. "Open Windows"
- "Rosary", "Baby Steps" and "Open Windows" were originally by released through Enders' other solo project Ace Enders and a Million Different People.
