= Lucas Keller =

American music executive and manager (born 1984)

- Born: Milwaukee, Wisconsin, US
- Occupation: Talent manager
- Years active: 2002—present

Lucas Keller is an American businessman, executive, and talent manager. He is the president and founder of Milk & Honey Management which represents a number of prominent songwriters, producers, and artists. He was included in the 2018 Billboard 40 Under 40, an annual list of the top young executives in music, and was named one of seven fast-rising executives on the Billboard Power 100 list that same year.

== Biography ==
Keller was born and raised in Waukesha, Wisconsin, the son of an architect and interior designer. He began as a guitarist in a local band and worked as a promoter for Phenomenon Concerts. He attended the University of Wisconsin–Oshkosh for four years before dropping out in 2006 to pursue a career in entertainment.

Keller moved to Chicago and managed bands for Uppercut Management. In 2008, he was recruited by Chris Allen, a founding partner of the management firm The Collective. He moved to Los Angeles to work for The Collective where he became the youngest manager in a department that managed top talent. Among his clients during this time was Scott Weiland; Keller helped negotiate his separation in 2013 from Stone Temple Pilots in court. He also signed reggae artist Jimmy Cliff. Keller left The Collective shortly afterward.

Keller founded Milk & Honey Management in 2014.

Keller has been vocal about improving Spotify royalty rates for songwriters and ensuring the future value of writers' catalogs. In April 2019, after Spotify and other streaming companies appealed a U.S. Copyright Royalty Board decision to raise songwriter royalty rates, Keller organized an open letter signed by over 100 participants in Spotify's "Secret Genius" initiative for producers and songwriters, including Louis Bell, Greg Wells, Teddy Geiger, Ian Kirkpatrick, Frank Dukes, Mike Elizondo, T-Minus, Scott Harris, Ross Golan, and Shane McAnally. In part the letter reads "Now, we can see the real reason for your songwriter outreach. You have used us and tried to divide us but we stand together...Do the right thing and drop your appeal." Keller has been vocal in his opposition to the rising number of copyright infringement cases in the music industry, calling them unfair for songwriters and the songwriting community.

A gay man, Keller has also been active on behalf of LGBTQ individuals in the industry; in 2018, he co-hosted with James "JHart" Abrahart and Brett "Leland" McLaughlin the inaugural "Out to Brunch" luncheon, a gathering of LGBTQ artists, songwriters, and other creatives in the music industry intended to foster collaboration and community. Notable attendees at the event included Troye Sivan, Justin Tranter, Ilsey Juber, Ferras Alqaisi, and Adam Lambert. He co-hosted the second annual Out to Brunch event in 2019, with notable attendees including Jesse Saint John, Vincint, Carlie Hanson, and Dorian Electra. Keller has been named to Billboard's inaugural Pride List in 2019 as one of the leading LGBT executives in the music business; to Billboard's 2020 list of 100 Change Agents, honoring individuals changing the music business through advocacy; to the Variety list of Hollywood's New Leaders of 2021; and to Out Magazine's Out100 list of LGBTQ+ Names at the Forefront of Beauty and Business.
