= I Can Make a Mess =

American emo band

I Can Make a Mess Like Nobody's Business
- Origin: United States
- Genres: Acoustic rock, emo pop, emo
- Years active: 2003–present
- Labels: Rise Records, Drive Thru
- Members: Arthur 'Ace' Enders

I Can Make a Mess, formerly I Can Make a Mess Like Nobody's Business, is an American acoustic rock/emo pop band, the side project of Ace Enders, lead singer and guitarist of the Early November.

== History ==
=== Self-titled album (2004) ===
Though the self-titled album was originally the only planned official release under the name I Can Make a Mess Like Nobody's Business, time would prove otherwise. The project spawned from Enders' desire to make music different from the Early November. Background noises, such as a television playing, are heard throughout the album until the eleventh track, "End of Background Noise" to symbolize the background noises in one's daily life. The main image in the album artwork is a yard rake, which symbolically counters the maple leaf that is associated with the Early November. The last track, "Salvy", is named after Enders' grandfather. The song "The Best Happiness Money Can Buy" appeared in a movie trailer for Must Love Dogs.

=== Revival of the band to present (2010–2014) ===
After the announced indefinite hiatus, Enders began recording music under the band name Ace Enders and A Million Different People. After a couple of albums, Ace decided to re-explore I Can Make a Mess Like Nobody's Business.

Enders released his second album under the I Can Make a Mess Like Nobody's Business name on March 23, 2010, entitled The World We Know. A music video was made for the song "Old Man...........................".

On September 16, Enders released the third Mess album, Dust'n Off the Ol' Guitar. The album featured redone versions of many Early November songs, as well as a couple Ace Enders & A Million Different People songs. The album also featured a new song titled "Growing Pains". There are also three songs from the album that will be released once the sales reach 5,000. These songs include "Pretty Pretty", a remix of "1000 Times A Day", and a full-length version of "Decoration".

On December 15, Enders released a Christmas-oriented EP titled Happy Christmas. The EP contains one original song titled "Season's Greetings", as well as a cover of "Christmastime Is Here" from the film A Charlie Brown Christmas, and a cover of the Charles Brown hit "Please Come Home For Christmas". The EP was released digitally.

Enders self-released the fourth I Can Make a Mess Like Nobody's Business album, Gold Rush, on May 5, 2011. This album was funded through fan donations through Kickstarter.

With the Early November reuniting and touring again, Enders has continued to release to support this project. Along with the Early November, the band was signed to Rise Records. In 2013, the band name has been shortened to "I Can Make a Mess". This can be seen on both the latest albums Enola, released on June 11, 2013, and Growing In, released on October 9, 2014.

Enders released his sixth I Can Make a Mess album, Posture Syndrome, on October 31, 2025, via Pure Noise Records. This was the first album release from I Can Make a Mess since Growing In, in 2014.

== Discography ==
- I Can Make a Mess Like Nobody's Business (2004)
- The World We Know (March 2010)
- Dust'n Off the Ol' Guitar (September 16, 2010)
- Happy Christmas (December 15, 2010)
- Gold Rush (May 5, 2011)
- Enola (June 11, 2013)
- Growing In (October 9, 2014)
- Posture Syndrome (October 31, 2025)

== Members ==
=== Current members ===
- Arthur 'Ace' Enders – vocals, guitar

=== Past and touring members ===
- Jeff Kummer - bass (2004)
- Chris Badami - drums (2004)
- "Ultra" Bill Lugg - guitar (2004)
- Tyler Davis – drums, vocals
- Robin Gazzara - keyboard, backing vocals
- Jennifer Enders - synthesizer
