= Chris Badami =

American record producer

Chris Badami is an American musician, record producer and audio engineer.

A New Jersey native, Badami began his musical journey by teaching himself the basics of recording on a four-track cassette recorder he received as a birthday gift.

Badami has recorded and produced hundreds of acts since the early 1990s. Badami got his start in the music industry as an active player and studio musician in the New York/New Jersey area. While performing in recording studios, his love of technology began. From there, Badami began working at top recording studios in the area and completed two college degrees in percussion and music technology from NYU (A.S. & B.M.).

The ability to relate to musicians in a recording environment is what led Badami to start Portrait Recording Studios. In 1995, he started Portrait Recording Studios with the idea of relating to musicians not only on a technical level, but also a musical level. Badami expanded on the idea by creating a relaxing, comfortable, and "State of the Art" environment for musicians worldwide.

His engineering and production credits span the globe on both a major and independent level, working with artists and labels such as: Days of the New, The Early November, I Can Make A Mess Like Nobody's Business, Luthea Salom, The Starting Line, The Dillinger Escape Plan, Hidden in Plain View, Roses Are Red, Stafford, Socratic, Midtown, Mike Patton, Burlap to Cashmere, Lenny White (Miles Davis, Stanley Clarke, Chick Corea), Mary Wilson of The Supremes, John Popper of Blues Traveler, Roark, Jodelle (entertainer), OneTwoThreeFour, Pete Nischt, Geffen Records, A&M Records, Interscope Records, Drive-Thru Records, Victory Records, Trustkill Records, Relapse Records, and Regular Music.

On a musical level, Badami has recently been published in Modern Drummer magazine and continues to perform and record regularly throughout the nation with I Can Make A Mess Like Nobody's Business, Roark and The Jon Klein Combine.
