= The Early November =

American emo band

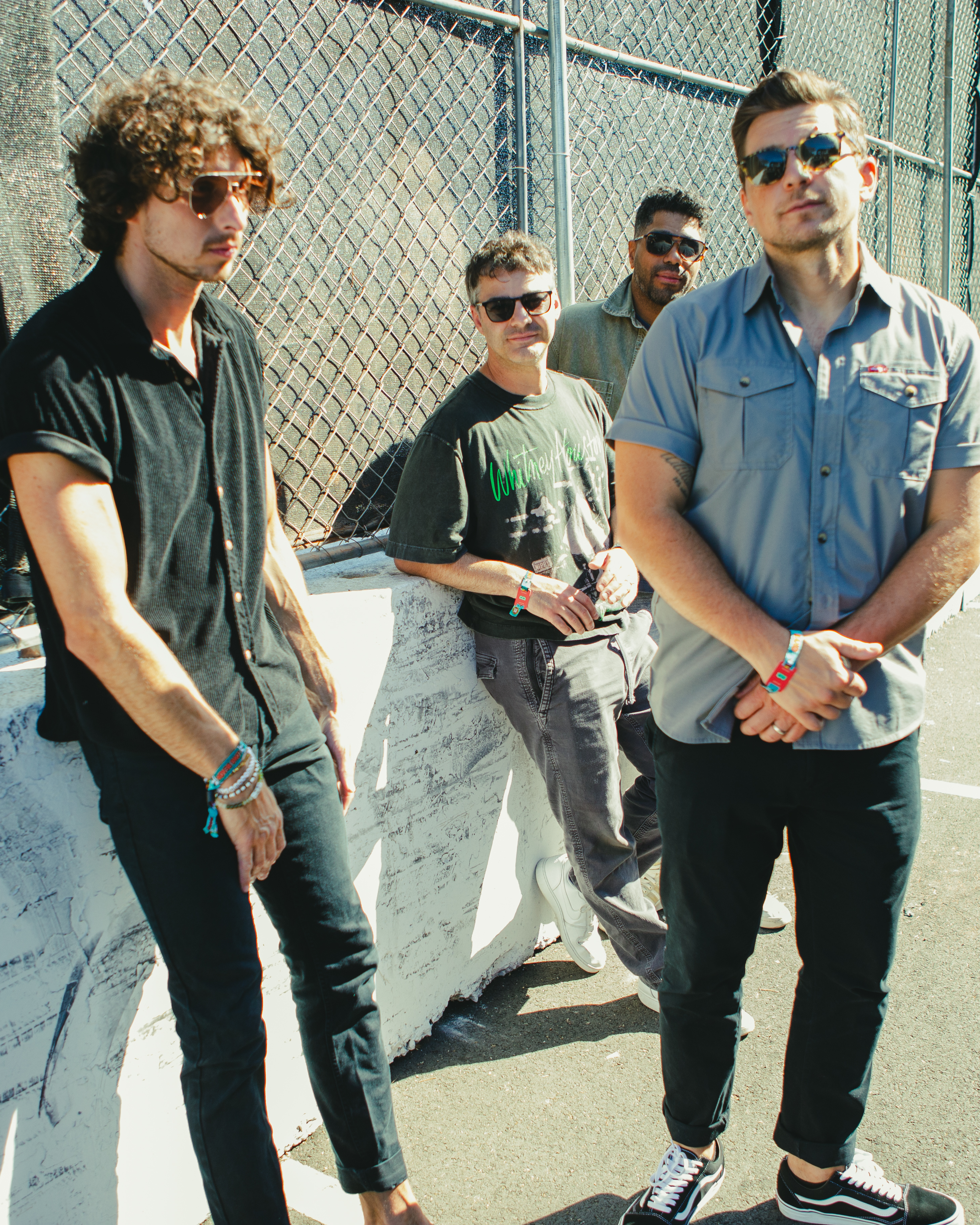

Background information
- Origin: Hammonton, New Jersey, U.S.
- Genres: Emo; post-hardcore; screamo; alternative rock; pop-punk; indie rock
- Years active: 2001–2007, 2011–present
- Labels: Drive-Thru Records; Rise Records; Pure Noise Records
- Spinoffs: I Can Make A Mess Like Nobody's Business, Ace Enders and a Million Different People
- Members: Ace Enders; Jeff Kummer; Mike Carney; Jose Lopez
- Past members: Sergio Anello; Joseph Marro; Bill Lugg; Nate Sander; John Dubitsky
- Website: theearlynovemberband.com

The Early November is an American rock band from New Jersey. The group formed in 2001 and signed with Drive-Thru Records in 2002. As of 2024, they have released two EPs — For All of This (2002) and The Acoustic EP (2002) — and six full-length albums: The Room's Too Cold (2003), The Mother, the Mechanic, and the Path (2006), In Currents (2012), Imbue (2015), Lilac (2019) and The Early November (2024).

== History ==
=== Formation and For All of This EP (2001–2002) ===
The band was formed in 2001 by singer and guitarist Ace Enders, drummer Jeff Kummer and bassist Sergio Anello in Hammonton, New Jersey. Together, they recorded a five-track demo in Enders' basement and sent it, along with a poorly edited videotape to only one label, Drive-Thru Records.

The band got in touch with Drive-Thru founder Richard Reines, who agreed to meet with the band to give advice. Upon returning to California, Reines discussed a possible signing with Drive-Thru co-owner Stefanie Reines. A few weeks later, Drive-Thru signed The Early November and placed them on 2002's Skate and Surf Fest and the Vans Warped Tour.

Before the recording of their debut EP For All of This, the band added an additional guitarist, John Dubitsky. The EP was released on Drive-Thru Records in December 2002. Enders recorded The Acoustic EP on his own, featuring acoustic versions of songs off their debut EP, releasing it two months later. Simultaneously, guitarist Joseph Marro joined the band in exchange for Dubitsky.

=== Early success and The Room's Too Cold (2003–2005) ===
Throughout 2003, the band continued to tour and write songs in preparation for their first full-length album The Room's Too Cold, which was released in fall of that year. The album debuted at #1 on Billboard Top Heatseekers and #107 on the Billboard 200.

Soon afterwards, Enders recorded a solo record under the name I Can Make a Mess Like Nobody's Business. The album was almost scrapped due to Enders wanting to focus on The Early November.

=== Triple disc album and hiatus (2006–2010) ===
During the recording process of their triple album, The Mother, The Mechanic, The Path, guitar tech Bill Lugg joined the band as a third guitarist.

The Mother, the Mechanic, and the Path was released on July 11, 2006. The album subsequently debuted at #31 on the Billboard 200 and is the band's highest-charting album to date.

On March 13, 2007, The Early November announced that they would be taking an "indefinite hiatus" following their headlining tour. Their last show prior to the hiatus was played on May 6 at The Bamboozle Festival in New Jersey.

=== Reunion and In Currents (2011–2012) ===
On June 22, 2011, Ace Enders and Jeff Kummer both announced that The Early November would be performing a reunion show at The Electric Factory in Philadelphia, PA on September 10. This was their first show together in 4 years. Additionally, they added a concert at the Starland Ballroom on November 26. It was confirmed at this show that they were in the recording process of a new album.

Two days later, it was announced that they had signed with Rise Records and would be releasing their third full-length album, In Currents on July 10, 2012.

The album debuted at #43 on the Billboard 200.

=== Imbue and Lilac (2013–2021) ===
On May 12, 2015, the band released their fourth studio album, Imbue. The album's first track "Narrow Mouth" was made available to stream online.

In July 2018, it was announced that their fifth studio album, titled Lilac, would be released in the fall. In November, the band Tweeted that the album was being pushed back to 2019.

In July 2019, the band announced Lilac will be released on September 27, 2019.

=== Twenty (2022–2023) ===
Their second compilation album, Twenty was released twenty years after their initial EP, For All of This. The tracks on this album are an homage to the band's early years. It was released October 14, 2022, via Pure Noise Records.

The Early November went on tour with Armor For Sleep in the fall of 2023 as both bands were celebrating the 20th anniversary of their debut albums, The Room's Too Cold and Dream to Make Believe, respectively, where they would play the albums live in their entirety. Also joining the two bands on tour was The Spill Canvas.

=== The Early November (2024) ===
In October 2023 the band announced that their sixth studio album will arrive in 2024, led by the single "About Me".

In March 2024, the band announced that their sixth studio album The Early November would be released on June 14th, 2024 via Pure Noise Records along with a new single "What We Earn" and a full US Tour with support from Spitalfield, Hellogoodbye, Hit The Lights, and Cliffdiver.

In April 2024, the band released a new track titled "The Fool."

In early May 2024, the band released "Tired of Lying." Singer, Ace Enders states "the song is about overcoming childhood trauma and demons while at the same time learning about and trying to face your new ones."

Later that month, they debuted their fifth preview of The Early November with the album's opening track "The Empress." Enders shares, "The song is about how hard it is to hold it together. We have to pretend a lot of the time to keep existing in the entertainment world. I can't say enough how grateful I am... but I also can't say it's been a walk in the park. Emotionally, I have been devastated many times, got back up to be knocked over again. And as a result, just kind of feel an unraveling of sorts almost all the time. This song is my inner struggle with overcoming that."

On June 14th, The Early November was released along with a music video for its feature track "We Hang On."

The band will make an appearance on the 2026 Vans Warped Tour.

== Musical style and influences ==
Johnny Loftus of Allmusic described The Early November's music as having the "Drive-Thru Records sound", which he elaborated as having "incorporated sensitive emo, pop, and punk revivalist amalgams with a bit of post-hardcore grit". The band's music has been likened to the works of The Get Up Kids, Dashboard Confessional and Brand New. Drummer Jeff Kummer has cited albums by Jimmy Eat World, Radiohead, Third Eye Blind, Weezer, blink-182 and Deftones as having influenced his playing style.

== Legacy ==
New Noise Magazine called the Early November a "staple in the emo genre".

== Members ==
Current

- Ace Enders – lead vocals, rhythm guitar (2001–2007, 2011–present), lead guitar (2001–2002)
- Jeff Kummer – drums, percussion, backing vocals (2001–2007, 2011–present)
- Mike Carney – lead guitar (2026–present; touring musician 2021–2026)
- Jose Lopez – bass (2026–present)

Former

- Sergio Anello – bass (2001–2007, 2011–2020)
- John Dubitsky – lead guitar (2002)
- Joseph Marro – lead guitar, keyboards (2002–2007, 2011–2017)
- Bill Lugg – rhythm guitar (2005–2007, 2011–2020)
- Nate Sander – lead guitar, keyboards, strings (2018–2021)

Former touring musicians

- Tom Ryan – bass (2021–2024, 2024–2026), rhythm guitar (2024)
- Dillon Wray – bass (2024)

== Discography ==
=== Studio albums ===
- The Room's Too Cold (2003)
- The Mother, the Mechanic, and the Path (2006)
- In Currents (2012)
- Imbue (2015)
- Lilac (2019)
- The Early November (2024)

=== Compilation albums ===
- Fifteen Years (2017)
- Twenty (2022)

=== EPs ===
- For All of This (2002)
- The Acoustic EP (2002)
- The Early November / I Am the Avalanche (2005)

=== Non-album tracks ===
- "Bizzare Love Triangle" – released on Dead Formats Vol. 2 (2024)
- "Power of Love" – released on Punk Goes 80's (2005)

=== Demo albums ===
- The 5 Song EP (2001)
- An Excellent Attempt at Next to Yousim (2001)

=== Music videos ===
- I Want to Hear You Sad (2002)
- Something That Produces Results (2003)
- The Mountain Range in My Living Room (2003)
- Hair (2006)
- Decoration (2006)
- In Currents (2012)
- Tell Me Why (2013)
- Better This Way (2015)
- Boxing Timelines (2015)
- Narrow Mouth (2016)
- Ave Maria (2019)
- I Dissolve (2019)
- Make It Happen (2022)
- About Me (2023)
- What We Earn (2024)
- The Fool (2024)
- Tired of Lying (2024)
- The Empress (2024)
- We Hang On (2024)

== Other projects ==
=== Ace Enders ===
- I Can Make a Mess Like Nobody's Business
- Ace Enders and A Million Different People
- Ace Enders
- Clear Eyes Fanzine
- Aaron West and the Roaring Twenties

=== Jeff Kummer ===
- Jeff Kummer
- Man Overboard
- I Can Make a Mess Like Nobody's Business
- Your Sweet Uncertainty

=== Mike Carney ===
- Mike Carney

=== Jose Lopez ===
- Houston Calls
- I Can Make A Mess Like Nobody's Business
