= Jason Costa =

American musician

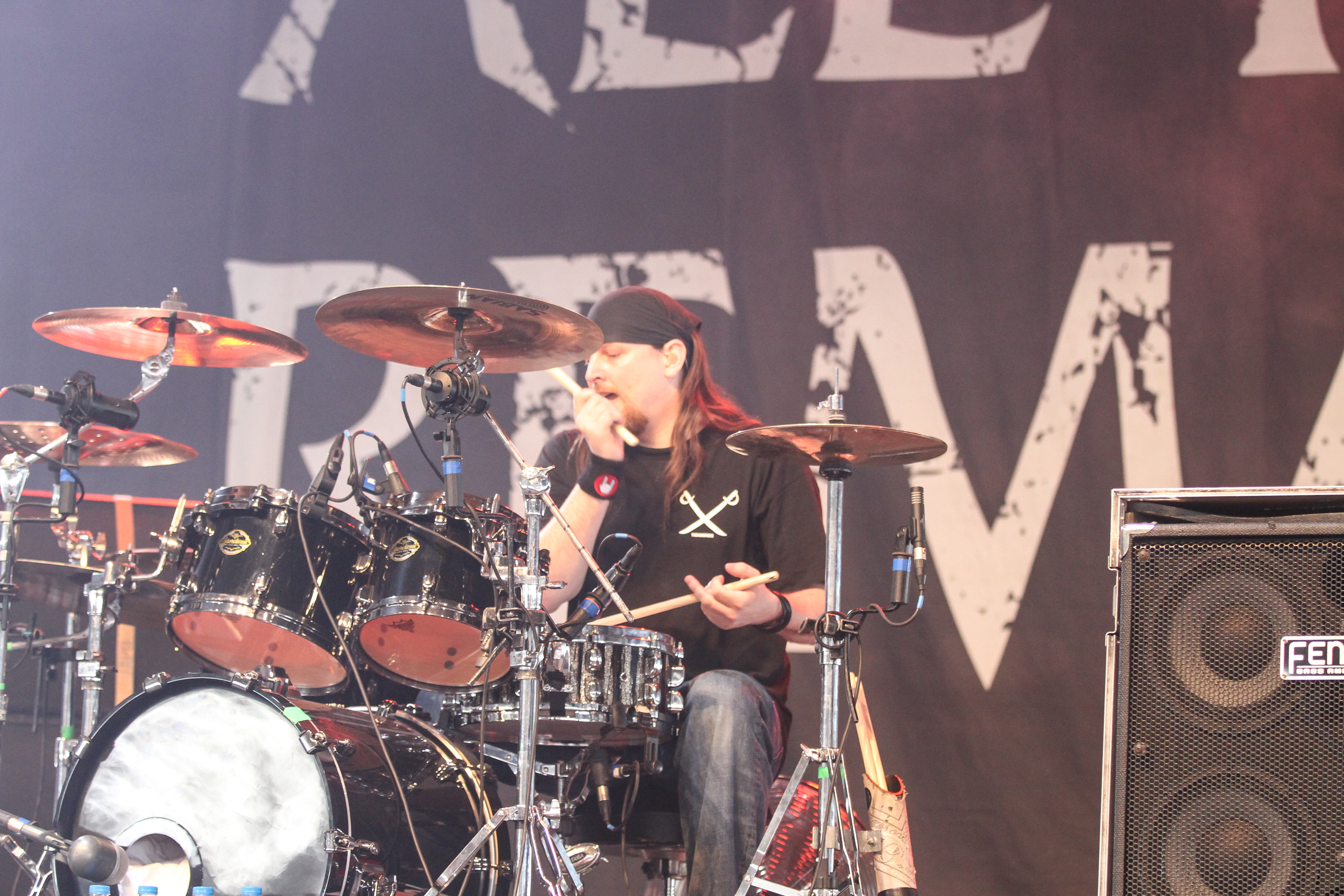
- Jason Costa performing in All That Remains in 2013.

Background information
- Born: November 5, 1972 (age 53)
- Origin: Quincy, Massachusetts, United States
- Genres: Metalcore; heavy metal; melodic metalcore
- Occupation: Drummer
- Instrument: Drums
- Years active: 1997–present

Jason Costa (born November 5, 1972) is an American musician, best known as the former drummer for the band Diecast, and the band All That Remains. He joined All That Remains in late 2006, joining almost immediately after Shannon Lucas left the band. Costa left the group in 2023. Jason has drummed for six All That Remains albums: Overcome, For We Are Many, A War You Cannot Win, The Order of Things, Madness, and Victim of the New Disease. He is notable for being one of the few heavy metal drummers to play solely with the 'traditional grip' and 'barefoot'.

== Career ==
=== Heresy (1989–1991) ===
Jason Costa was one of the original founding members of Boston based thrash band Heresy. Other founding members, Ken Nasif, Peter Giannacopolous, Mike McKee.

=== Diecast (1997–2006) ===
Jason Costa joined the Boston-based band Diecast as the original drummer in 1997. During that year, the band released their album Perpetual War. A year later, in 1998, they released their first label-produced album, Undo the Wicked. After these two album releases they would go to make the albums Day of Reckoning and Tearing Down Your Blue Skies. Then, in 2006, Jason Costa left Diecast to join the band All That Remains.

=== All That Remains (2006–2023) ===
Jason Costa auditioned for All That Remains in 2006 to replace former drummer Shannon Lucas. When asked if making the switch from Diecast to All That Remains was difficult, he said, "Nothing for me was a challenge except having to put some time into practicing blast beats, but those are pretty easy... no secret to learning that. Just a metronome and some endurance." After about a year and a half, All That Remains released their first album with Jason as their drummer: Overcome. The songs in Overcome included the singles Two Weeks and Forever In Your Hands. Music videos were made for the two singles.

On October 12, 2010, All That Remains released their next album, For We Are Many. It spawned the single 'Hold On' in 2010, and two more singles, 'The Last Time' and 'The Waiting One', in 2011. Music videos were made for the first two singles.

In 2012, All That Remains released updates and videos, hinting to new songs and a new album. Then, on March 27, 2012, the vocalist for All That Remains, Phil Labonte, uploaded a video that showcased around ten seconds of the band recording a new song (the song turned out to be a riff from 'Stand Up (Stand Up)'. Finally, on August 13, Phil personally uploaded a video of their new single 'Down Through the Ages', and then on August 29, All That Remains released the official lyrics video for their next, newest single 'Stand Up (Stand Up)'.

On 20 July 2023, Jason announced he was leaving All That Remains, citing "deeply personal reasons" that were unrelated to the band.

== Discography ==
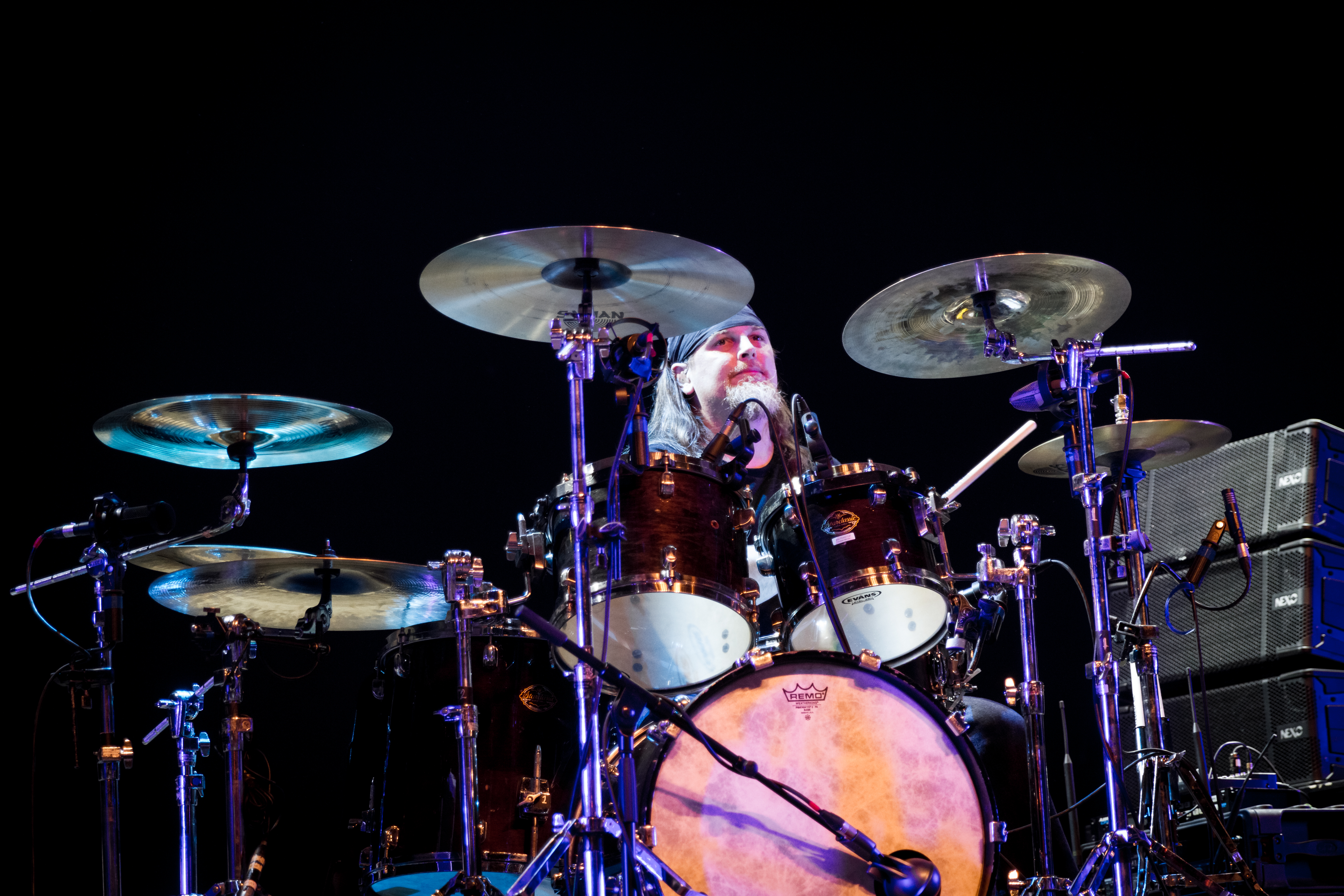

=== Diecast ===
- Perpetual War – demo (1997)
- Sampler – demo (1999)
- Undo the Wicked (1998)
- Day of Reckoning (2001)
- Tearing Down Your Blue Skies (2004)

=== All That Remains ===
- Overcome (2008)
- For We Are Many (2010)
- A War You Cannot Win (2012)
- The Order of Things (2015)
- Madness (2017)
- Victim of the New Disease (2018)
