= Killswitch Engage discography =

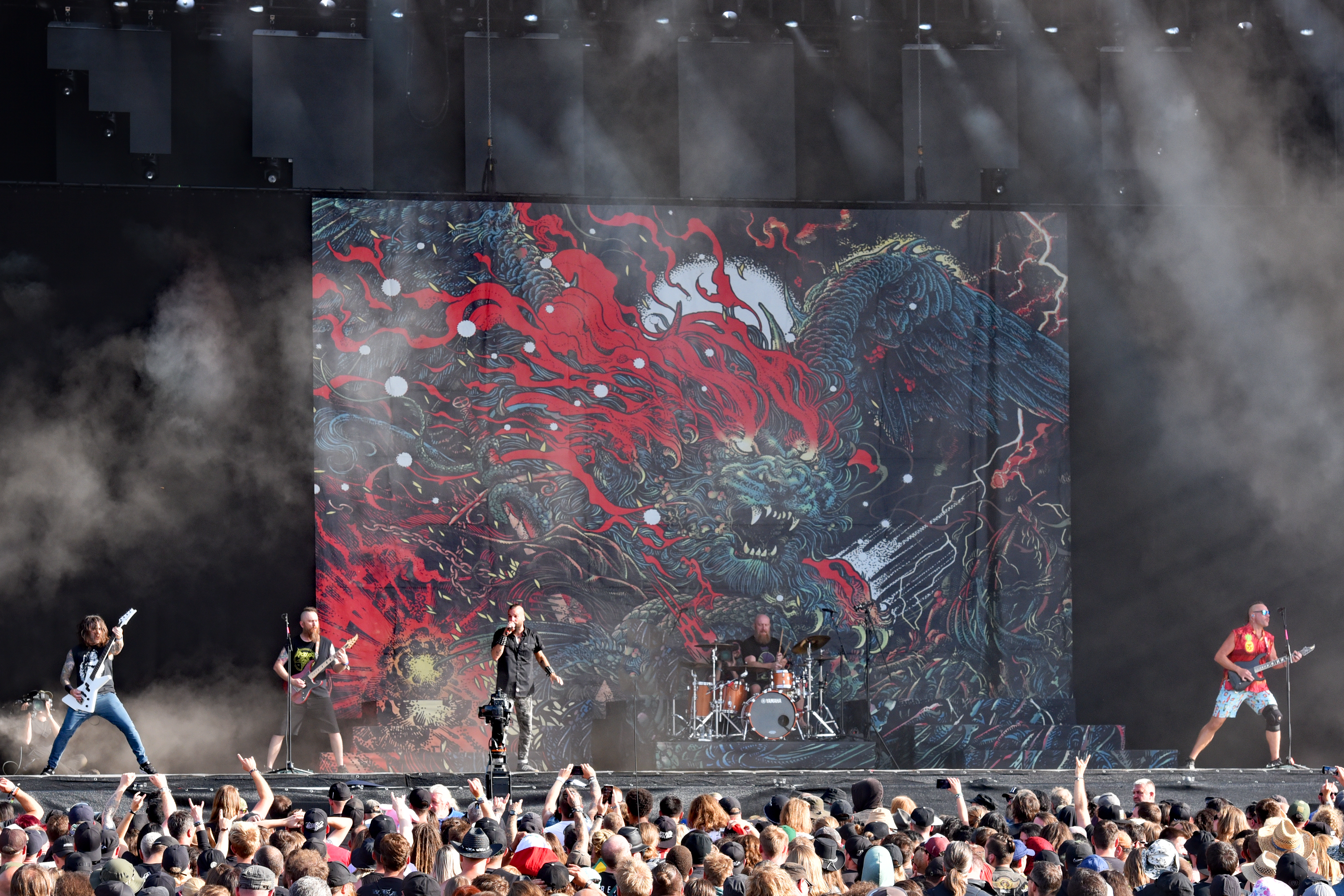
- Studio albums: 9
- Singles: 23
- Video albums: 3
- Music videos: 21

Killswitch Engage is an American metalcore band from Westfield, Massachusetts. Their discography consists of nine studio albums, three video albums, and twenty-three singles. Formed in 1999, the band signed with Ferret Music, and released their self-titled debut album in 2000. They then signed a recording contract with Roadrunner Records, releasing Alive or Just Breathing in 2002. The album peaked at number 37 on the Heatseekers Albums chart. Their third album, 2004's The End of Heartache, peaked at number 21 on the Billboard 200, and sold 38,000 copies in its first week of release. The album was certified gold by the Recording Industry Association of America (RIAA) in 2007, denoting shipments of over 500,000 copies.

In 2005, Killswitch Engage was nominated for Best Metal Performance at the 47th Grammy Awards. Later that year, the band issued the video album (Set This) World Ablaze, which contained a live concert in their hometown, a documentary, and all of their music videos from 2002 to 2004. The DVD was certified gold by the RIAA in 2006 for shipments exceeding 50,000 copies. Their fourth studio album, As Daylight Dies, was released later that year and peaked at number 32 on the Billboard 200 with 60,000 copies sold in its first week. On November 23, 2021 it became the bands first album to be certified Platinum by the RIAA for selling over 1,000,000 copies in the United States. Killswitch Engage's fifth studio album, Killswitch Engage, which was released in 2009, debuted at number seven on the Billboard 200, making it their highest-charting record at that time. It was also the band’s first release to top the Hard Rock Albums Billboard.

The band's sixth album, Disarm the Descent, was released in 2013 and debuted at number seven on the Billboard 200 and topped both the U.S Top Rock Albums Billboard and the Hard Rock Albums Billboard. The album also charted within the top 20 in eight countries, their first album to do so. The band were once again nominated for Best Metal Performance at the 56th Annual Grammy Awards. Continuing on the success of Disarm the Descent, Killswitch Engage's 2016 album Incarnate peaked at number 6 on the Billboard 200, and in the top 10 in several countries, it was also the band’s first album to top the U.S Top Rock Albums Billboard and its second to top the Hard Rock Albums Billboard. It sold 35,000 copies in its first week of release, and is their highest-charting album to date. Later that following year the band released a two disc-set Blu-ray video album titled Beyond the Flames: Home Video Vol. 2 which consist of multiple live performances around the world from 2012 to 2016, a documentary, music videos, band member profiles and a bonus live CD from their 2014 Monster Mosh show in their hometown of Worcester, Massachusetts.

The band then signed with Metal Blade Records to release their 8th studio album Atonement in 2019. The album sold 33,000 copies in its first week and peaked at number 13 on the Billboard 200, topped both the U.S Top Rock Albums and Hard Rock Albums Billboard and charted in the top 20 in 8 other countries. The band was nominated for Best Metal Performance for a 3rd time at the 62nd Grammy Awards. In 2022 Killswitch Engage released a live album titled live at the Palldium which was recorded at the Palladium theatre in Worcester Massachusetts. Following this the band released their 9th album This Consequence in 2025. The album peaked at number 188 on the Billboard 200 and peaked in the top 20 in two other countries.

== Albums ==
=== Studio albums ===
List of studio albums, with selected chart positions and certification
Title	Album details	Peak chart positions											Certifications
Title	Album details	US	AUS	AUT	CAN	FIN	GER	IRL	JPN	NZ	SWI	UK	Certifications
Killswitch Engage	Released: July 4, 2000; Label: Ferret; Formats: CD, digital download	—	—	—	—	—	—	—	—	—	—	—	
Alive or Just Breathing	Released: May 21, 2002; Label: Roadrunner; Formats: CD, LP, digital download	—	—	—	—	—	—	—	—	—	—	122	BPI: Silver
The End of Heartache	Released: May 11, 2004; Label: Roadrunner; Formats: CD, LP, digital download	21	39	—	—	—	42	64	—	—	—	40	RIAA: Gold; BPI: Silver
As Daylight Dies	Released: November 21, 2006; Label: Roadrunner; Formats: CD, LP, digital download	32	29	68	40	—	62	—	43	—	—	64	RIAA: Platinum; BPI: Gold; MC: Gold
Killswitch Engage	Released: June 30, 2009; Label: Roadrunner; Formats: CD, LP, digital download	7	12	36	11	15	27	80	60	24	51	29	
Disarm the Descent	Released: April 2, 2013; Label: Roadrunner; Formats: CD, LP, digital download	7	6	15	6	8	12	96	55	17	23	15	
Incarnate	Released: March 11, 2016; Label: Roadrunner; Formats: CD, LP, digital download	6	5	10	4	14	10	50	69	20	10	10	
Atonement	Released: August 16, 2019; Label: Metal Blade; Formats: CD, LP, digital download	13	4	16	17	12	11	—	60	—	9	13	
This Consequence	Released: February 21, 2025; Label: Metal Blade; Formats: CD, LP, digital download	188	—	13	—	—	13	—	45	—	24	85	
"—" denotes a recording that did not chart or was not released in that territory.

=== Video albums ===
List of video albums, with selected chart positions and certifications
Title	Album details	Peak chart positions		Certifications
Title	Album details	US Video	AUS Video	Certifications
(Set This) World Ablaze	Released: November 22, 2005; Label: Roadrunner; Formats: DVD	21	21	RIAA: Gold; MC: Gold
Beyond the Flames: Home Video, Part II	Released: November 25, 2016; Label: Roadrunner; Formats: Blu-ray, CD, digital download	—	—	
Live at the Palladium	Released: June 3, 2022; Label: Metal Blade; Formats: Blu-ray, CD, digital download, vinyl	—	—	

== Singles ==
List of singles, with selected chart positions, showing year released and album name
Title	Year	Peak chart positions						Certifications	Album
Title	Year	Rock Digital Songs	US Hard Rock	US Hard Rock Digi.	US Main. Rock	US Rock	UK Rock	Certifications	Album
"Self Revolution"	2002	—	—	—	—	—	—		Alive or Just Breathing
"My Last Serenade"	2002	—	—	—	—	—	—		Alive or Just Breathing
"The Element of One"	2003	—	—	—	—	—	—		Alive or Just Breathing
"Rose of Sharyn"	2004	—	—	—	—	—	—		The End of Heartache
"The End of Heartache"	2004	—	—	—	31	—	—	RIAA: Gold	The End of Heartache
"A Bid Farewell"	2005	—	—	—	—	—	—		The End of Heartache
"My Curse"	2006	—	—	—	21	—	—	RIAA: Platinum; BPI: Silver	As Daylight Dies
"The Arms of Sorrow"	2007	—	—	—	30	—	—		As Daylight Dies
"Holy Diver"	2007	—	—	—	12	—	—	RIAA: Gold	As Daylight Dies
"This Is Absolution"	2008	―	―	―	—	—	—		As Daylight Dies
"Reckoning"	2009	—	—	—	—	—	—		Killswitch Engage
"Starting Over"	2009	—	—	—	30	—	28		Killswitch Engage
"Take Me Away"	2009	—	—	—	—	—	—		Killswitch Engage
"Save Me"	2010	—	—	—	—	—	—		Killswitch Engage
"In Due Time"	2013	—	—	7	26	—	16		Disarm the Descent
"Always"	2013	—	—	—	15	—	—		Disarm the Descent
"Beyond the Flames"	2013	—	—	—	—	—	—		Disarm the Descent
"Strength of the Mind"	2015	33	—	4	—	—	—		Incarnate
"Hate by Design"	2016	40	—	6	22	—	—		Incarnate
"Cut Me Loose"	2016	—	—	—	—	—	—		Incarnate
"Unleashed"	2019	—	—	10	—	29	—		Atonement
"I Am Broken Too"	2019	—	—	—	19	37	—		Atonement
"The Signal Fire" (featuring Howard Jones)	2019	15	—	9	—	19	—		Atonement
"I Can't Be the Only One"	2020	—	—	—	17	—	—		Atonement
"Forever Aligned"	2024	—	—	—	—	—	—		This Consequence
"I Believe"	2025	—	19	—	4	—	—		This Consequence
"Blood Upon the Ashes"	2025	—	—	—	—	—	—		The Dogs of Hope
"—" denotes a recording that did not chart or was not released in that territory.

=== Other Charted Songs ===
Song	Year	Peak chart positions	Album
Song	Year	UK Rock	Album
"This Fire"	2011	36	As Daylight Dies

== Music videos ==
List of music videos, showing year released and directors
Title	Year	Director(s)
"Self Revolution" (Live)	2002	Adam Francis
"My Last Serenade"	2002	Paul Brown
"Life to Lifeless"	2003	Doug Spangenberg
"Fixation on the Darkness"	2003	Pierre Lamoureux
"Rose of Sharyn"	2004	Lex Halaby
"The End of Heartache"	2004	Tony Petrossian
"A Bid Farewell"	2005	Lex Halaby
"My Curse"	2006	Lex Halaby
"The Arms of Sorrow"	2007	Alex Topaller & Daniel Shapiro
"Holy Diver"	2007	Brian Thompson
"This Is Absolution"	2008	Denise Korycki
"Starting Over"	2009	Lex Halaby
"Save Me"	2010	Jim Starace
"In Due Time"	2013	Ian McFarland & Mike Pecci
"Always"	2013	Ian McFarland & Mike Pecci
"Strength of the Mind"	2015	Ian McFarland & Mike Pecci
"Hate by Design"	2016	Ian McFarland & Mike Pecci
"Cut Me Loose"	2016	Jeremy Danger & Travis Shinn
"I Am Broken Too"	2019	Kyle Cogan & Zack Stauffer
"The Signal Fire"	2019	Ian McFarland
"Us Against the World"	2021	David Brodsky & Allison Woest
"Forever Aligned"	2024	
"I Believe"	2025	Tom Flynn & Mike Watts
"Collusion"	2025	Tom Flynn & Mike Watts
"Aftermath"	2025	David Brodsky
