= Live at the Palladium (Killswitch Engage album) =

Live album by Killswitch Engage
- Released: June 3, 2022
- Recorded: August 6, 2021
- Venue: The Palladium in Worcester, Massachusetts
- Genre: Melodic metalcore
- Length: 70:32
- Label: Metal Blade
- Directors: David Brodsky and Allison Woest

Killswitch Engage chronology
Atonement (2019)	Live at the Palladium (2022)	This Consequence (2025)

Live at the Palladium is the first live album by the American metalcore band Killswitch Engage. The album is of a streaming event that was taped at The Palladium in Worcester, Massachusetts on August 6, 2021. The setlist consists of the entirety of their 2019 album Atonement, along with their 2000 self-titled debut album in full. It was released via Blu-ray, CD, digital download and vinyl.

The album was notably not recorded in front of an audience so there is no crowd noise throughout the album.

== Reception ==
Professional ratings
Review scores
Source	Rating
Metal Temple Magazine	7/10
Ghost Cult Magazine	8/10
Distorted Sound	8/10

Metal Wim of Metal Temple wrote that the way the album "is played and recorded definitely does KILLSWITCH ENGAGE justice." Adding "It shows that these guys love what they're doing, and are proud to bring it out to the public." Tasha Brown of Distored Sound wrote "Though we can’t score this record on introspection, as much as we would like to. Releasing a live album with no crowd reaction feels misjudged in places but it still goes to show KILLSWTCH ENGAGE are a band to be reckoned with in the live arena."

== Track listing ==
All tracks are written by Killswitch Engage.

No.	Title	Length
1.	"Unleashed"	4:25
2.	"The Signal Fire"	3:13
3.	"U.S. Against the World"	3:21
4.	"The Crownless King"	3:12
5.	"I Am Broken Too"	2:30
6.	"As Sure as the Sun Will Rise"	2:55
7.	"Know Your Enemy"	3:54
8.	"Take Control"	3:48
9.	"Ravenous"	2:51
10.	"I Can’t Be the Only One"	3:45
11.	"Bite the Hand That Feeds"	3:43
12.	"Temple from the Within"	3:43
13.	"Vide Infra"	3:29
14.	"Irreversal"	4:21
15.	"Rusted Embrace"	4:28
16.	"Prelude"	1:54
17.	"Soilborn"	3:25
18.	"Numb Sickened Eyes"	3:26
19.	"In the Unblind"	2:52
20.	"Just Barely Breathing"	5:40

=== Music videos ===
1. As Sure as the Sun Will Rise
2. Know Your Enemy
3. Vide Infra

== Personnel ==
Killswitch Engage

- Adam Dutkiewicz – lead guitar, backing vocals
- Joel Stroetzel – rhythm guitar
- Mike D'Antonio – bass, artwork
- Jesse Leach – lead vocals
- Justin Foley – drums

== Charts ==
Chart (2022)	Peak position
German Albums (Offizielle Top 100)	61
Swiss Albums (Schweizer Hitparade)	87
Scottish Albums (OCC)	100
UK Albums Sales (OCC)	90
UK Physical Albums (OCC)	89
UK Rock & Metal Albums (OCC)	13
UK Independent Albums (OCC)	21
