= I Am Broken Too (song) =

2019 single by Killswitch Engage

Single by Killswitch Engage

from the album Atonement
- Released: July 16, 2019
- Genre: Melodic metalcore
- Length: 2:41
- Label: Metal Blade
- Songwriter: Killswitch Engage
- Producer: Adam Dutkiewicz

Killswitch Engage singles chronology
"Unleashed" (2019)	"I Am Broken Too" (2019)	"The Signal Fire" (2019)

"I Am Broken Too" is a song by the American metalcore band Killswitch Engage. It was the second single off their 2019 album Atonement and was released on July 16, and was occupied with an official lyric video upon release. the song touches upon mental health struggles. It reached number 19 on the US Mainstream Rock chart.

== Background ==
Lead singer Jesse Leach who was struggled with metal health problems in the past wrote "I Am Broken Too" in an effort to help raise awareness for metal health issues.

On the day of the song’s release Leach took to his instagram stating that the song means more to him than almost any other he had written up to that point. Leach later commented on how he got inspiration to write the song stating:

The song actually is written about somebody else, which was a unique way to deal with it seeing how they processed it and then putting myself in the narrative, I'm talking to somebody, it's a conversation that's happening. You kind of need dark times and tragedy to inspire songs that dig that deep. I think anyone can relate to that. If you're happy — if I write a song about happiness it's not gonna really strike you in the same way. I guess you do have to go through pain to write stuff that's that meaty and inspirational.

Killswitch Engage donated a portion of the proceeds from the song to the Chicago based suicide prevention charity Hope For The Day. The organization founder Johnny Boucher added "I Am Broken Too" is a song that truly encompasses what we need to be doing in society, talking about what we have been through."

== Reception ==
Chris Annunziata of Metal Insider gave the song credit stating "The chorus is so catchy and very easy to sing along to. Between the lyrics and the passion in Jesse’s voice, you can tell he poured his heart out. This track has a ton of replay value, as I find myself listening to it two or three times in a row."

== Music video ==
The music video was directed by Kyle Cogan and Zack Stauffer it was released on August 5, 2019. The video focuses on real life events that family members of the band have gone through.

== Charts ==
Chart (2019)	Peak position
US Mainstream Rock (Billboard)	19
US Hot Rock & Alternative Songs	37

== Personnel ==
Killswitch Engage

- Jesse Leach – lead vocals
- Adam Dutkiewicz – lead guitar, backing vocals
- Joel Stroetzel – rhythm guitar
- Mike D'Antonio – bass guitar
- Justin Foley – drums
