= Worcester Palladium =

Concert hall in Worcester, Massachusetts

- The Palladium
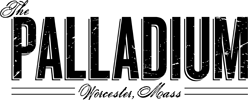
- The Palladium • Worcester, Mass.

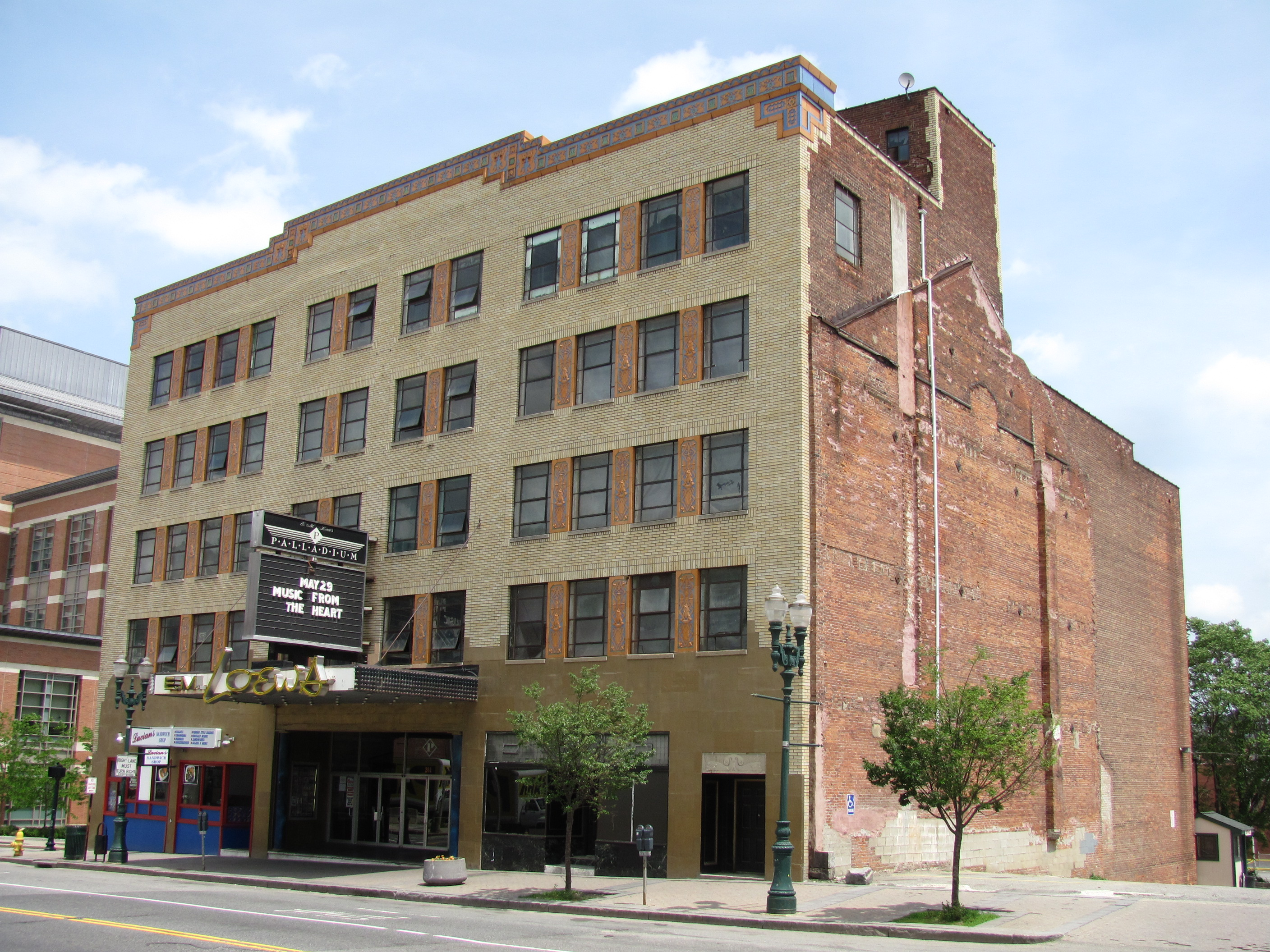
- Interactive map of Worcester Palladium
- Full name: Worcester Palladium
- Former names: Plymouth Theatre (1928–1980); E.M. Loew's Center for the Performing Arts (1980–1990)
- Location: 261 Main St; Worcester, Massachusetts 01608
- Coordinates: 42.2667°N 71.8008°W
- Owner: John Peters, Cliff Rucker
- Capacity: 2,160 (Main Room); 500 (Upstairs)
- Public transit: MBTA Framingham/Worcester Line Worcester

Construction
- Opened: November 24, 1928 (97 years ago)

Website
- Venue Website

The Worcester Palladium, also known as The Palladium or Palladium Theatre, is an all-ages concert hall and performance venue located in Worcester, Massachusetts. The Palladium was designed by architect Arlan W. Johnson and opened as a theatre in 1928 as the Plymouth Theatre. It has a seating capacity of 2,160 in the Main Room and 500 in the upstairs room and is a popular venue for rock and metal bands. The New England Metal and Hardcore Festival takes place at the Palladium annually.

Since 1990, the booking agency MassConcerts has handled all booking for The Palladium; A live concert DVD by The Devil Wears Prada titled Dead & Alive was filmed at the Palladium on December 14, 2011.

A live concert DVD by Insane Clown Posse titled New Years Ninja Party was filmed at the Palladium on New Years Eve 2012.

Metalcore band Killswitch Engage released a live album recorded at The Palladium in 2022, titled "Live at the Palladium"

== History ==
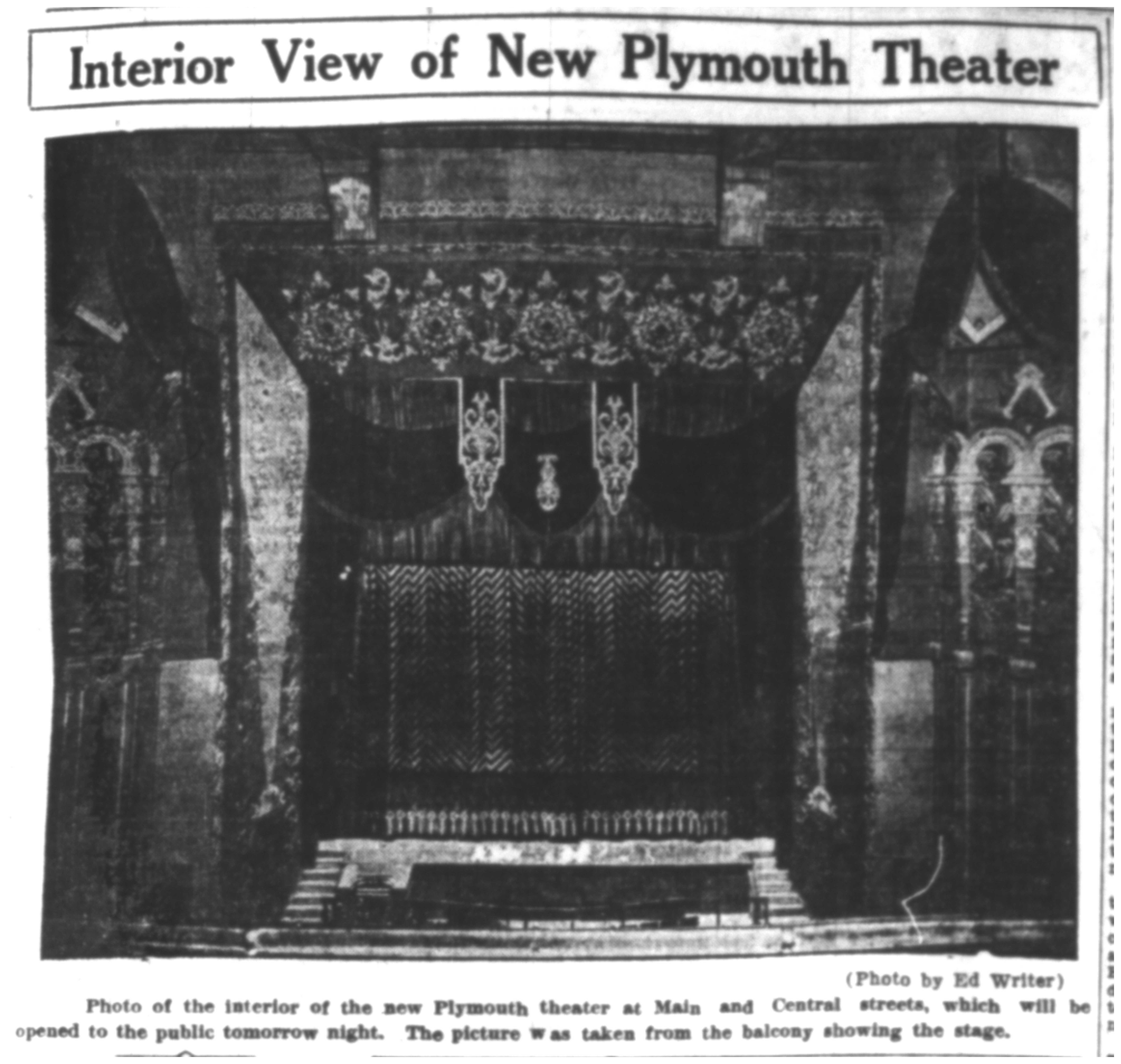
Plymouth Theatre (see also Original Seating)

The Plymouth Theatre, originally leased by Alfred Gottesman Theatrical Enterprises, Inc., is situated at the corner of Main St. and Central St. and was first opened on November 24, 1928—"Doors open at 7:00 p.m.", "Curtain at 8 o'clock"—according to the bill in the Evening Gazette's News Notes of Worcester Stage and Screen.

For the inaugural performances, the theater presented a "scene of beauty" to its guests—the foyer was decorated with about 100 baskets of roses and other flowers (gifts of some of the leading business establishments of the time), while the stage was banked with palms and flowers. Mr. Alfred Gottesman, lessee of The Plymouth, gave his personal supervision to the plans for the theater and had invited many of the night's guests personally.

The theater opened with a Robert Morton pipe organ; the opening bill for the theater advertises "Buddy" Webber at the Console of Our Mighty Organ. As of 2008 the organ had been purchased and installed in a private residence.

The building was renamed the E.M. Loew's Center for the Performing Arts on April 14, 1980, and by 1990 became The Palladium. In July 2012, owners John Fischer and John Sousa filed a waiver to Worcester's demolition delay ordinance after receiving an increase in the Palladium's property taxes. Despite the demolition delay ordinance, The Palladium found success in booking metalcore and hardcore bands, allowing it to continue operation.
