= Unleashed (Killswitch Engage song) =

2019 single by Killswitch Engage

Single by Killswitch Engage

from the album Atonement
- Released: July 19, 2019
- Genre: Melodic metalcore
- Length: 4:35
- Label: Metal Blade
- Songwriter: Killswitch Engage
- Producer: Adam Dutkiewicz

Killswitch Engage singles chronology
"Cut Me Loose" (2016)	"Unleashed" (2019)	"I Am Broken Too" (2019)

"Unleashed" is a song by the American metalcore band Killswitch Engage. It was the lead single off their 2019 album Atonement. It was released on July 19, 2019 and was accompanied by an official lyric video. The song was nominated for Best Metal Performance at the 62nd Annual Grammy Awards.

== Background ==
In an interview with Loudwire, the bands lead singer Jesse Leach commented on the song’s meaning, stating "'Unleashed' is about inner passion and rage coming up to the surface," adding, "we all have that wild within that often stays dormant until a tragic event triggers and awakens it. This song is about that awakening within. I feel we were able to capture something raw and intense on this song." In se

The song also draws inspiration from former lucha Underground wrestler Marty The Moth Martinez. As it was originally recorded to be his entrance theme during his championship reign however it never came to fruition.

== Reception ==
Loudwire's Joe DiVita described the song as "an immediate standout in the Killswitch catalog", while adding "Leach's powerful clean singing on the song is perhaps his strongest studio work to date". Loudwire also put the song on their list of the 66 best metal songs of 2019.

Brendan Fisher of GBHBL gave the song a positive review, stating: "It starts with a nice little melody before exploding into life with a deafening roar. We get a solid crunching riff with some wicked drumming."

Chris Annunziata of Metal Insider, commented on why the song was the opening track, stating "with luring notes of Adam D’s guitar and Jesse’s throat-ripping scream, the song immediately captures your attention within the first ten seconds. To further pull you in, Jesse then uses his powerful highs to sing the song title. This track is the perfect trademark of the band’s modern sound."

"Unleashed" was nominated for Best Metal Performance at the 62nd Annual Grammy Awards, marking Killswitch Engage’s third total nomination. It lost to "7empest" by Tool.

== Charts ==
Chart (2019)	Peak position
US Hot Rock & Alternative Songs	29
US Hard Rock Digital Song Sales	10

== Personnel ==
Killswitch Engage

- Jesse Leach – lead vocals
- Adam Dutkiewicz – lead guitar, backing vocals
- Joel Stroetzel – rhythm guitar
- Mike D'Antonio – bass
- Justin Foley – drums
