= I Believe (Killswitch Engage song) =

Single by Killswitch Engage

from the album This Consequence
- Released: January 23, 2025
- Genre: Melodic metalcore
- Length: 3:54
- Label: Metal Blade
- Songwriter: Killswitch Engage
- Producer: Adam Dutkiewicz

Killswitch Engage singles chronology
"Forever Aligned" (2024)	"I Believe" (2025)	"Collusion" (2025)

"I Believe" is a song by the American metalcore band Killswitch Engage. It was released as the second single from their ninth album, This Consequence on January 23, 2025. The song was accompanied with an official music video on its release. It is the bands first song to reach the top ten on the U.S. Mainstream Rock chart peaking at number 4.

== Background ==
The songs lyrics focus on faith and remaining optimistic that things will get better. During an interview with Kerrang! lead singer Jesse Leach described the songs meaning stating "I Believe is about undying hope," "During difficult times perspective is everything. Knowing deep down that 'this too shall pass' has been a beacon of light for me. I do believe there is meaning behind suffering. If we are able to push through difficult times and come out the other side, there is a renewed sense of purpose."

== Reception ==
Gregory Adams of Revolver Magazine claimed "I Believe" "hit a more anthemic and rocking tone than previously delivered thrash-and-basher “Forever Aligned,” with vocalist Jesse Leach more generally (though not exclusively) using an impassioned croon to work through lines about feeling hindered by paranoia, yet still striving to keep hope alive in dark times."

Jason West of New Noise Magazine wrote " I Believe," offers us a genuine stadium anthem. It begins with a guitar riff that will stick in your head for days. Leach gracefully leads in by singing the simple yet catchy lyric, “I believe.” Musically, this may be one of their best singles to date. Dutliewicz’s lead guitar teeters on pop sensibility and metal throughout the song. The rhythm section of Foley and bassist Michael D’Antonio create a steady dose of metal prowess without going over the top."

== Charts ==
Chart (2025)	Peak position
US Mainstream Rock (Billboard)	4
US Hard Rock (Billboard)	19
US Rock & Alternative Airplay (Billboard)	20
