= Killswitch Engage =

American metalcore band

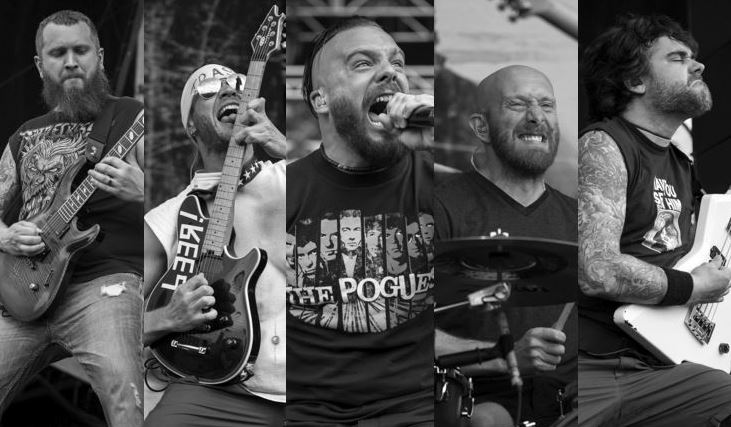
- Killswitch Engage performing in 2014

Background information
- Origin: Westfield, Massachusetts, U.S.
- Genre: Melodic metalcore
- Works: Killswitch Engage discography
- Years active: 1999–present
- Labels: Roadrunner; Ferret; Metal Blade; Columbia; Sony
- Members: Mike D'Antonio; Adam Dutkiewicz; Joel Stroetzel; Jesse Leach; Justin Foley
- Past members: Pete Cortese; Tom Gomes; Howard Jones
- Website: killswitchengage.com

Killswitch Engage is an American metalcore band from Westfield, Massachusetts, formed in 1999. The band's current lineup consists of vocalist Jesse Leach, guitarists Joel Stroetzel and Adam Dutkiewicz, bassist Mike D'Antonio, and drummer Justin Foley. Howard Jones was the band's lead vocalist from 2002 to 2012.

Leach was the band's founding vocalist but left after two albums. He was replaced by Jones, and Killswitch Engage rose to fame with its 2004 release The End of Heartache, which peaked at number 21 on the Billboard 200 and was certified gold by the RIAA for over 500,000 shipments in the United States. The title track was nominated for a Grammy Award in 2005 for Best Metal Performance. The band's fourth album, As Daylight Dies, was certified platinum in the US and spawned the platinum-selling single "My Curse". In 2014 they were dubbed the greatest metalcore band of all time by both OC Weekly and Ultimate Guitar.

Jones departed in 2012 and Leach returned to his founding position. Disarm the Descent (2013), the band's first album since Leach's return, went top 10 in the US and featured the Grammy-nominated single "In Due Time". They garnered a third nomination for "Unleashed" in 2020. In addition Killswitch Engage has won multiple Boston Music Awards and Metal Hammer Golden Gods Awards. The band's ninth album, This Consequence, was released on February 21, 2025.

== History ==
=== Early years and debut album (1999–2001) ===
Killswitch Engage formed following the disbandment of metalcore bands Overcast and Aftershock in 1999. After Overcast broke up in 1998, bassist Mike D'Antonio collaborated with Aftershock guitarist Adam Dutkiewicz. Dutkiewicz, now playing drums, recruited guitarist Joel Stroetzel from Aftershock and vocalist Jesse Leach of the band Nothing Stays Gold (who were signed to a record label owned by Dutkiewicz's brother Tobias, who was also the vocalist in Aftershock) to form a new band, Killswitch Engage. The band's name is derived from an episode of the television series The X-Files entitled "Kill Switch", written by William Gibson, who gave the episode this title after meeting the industrial band Kill Switch...Klick.

In 1999, Killswitch Engage recorded a demo containing four tracks including their first song "Soilborn". The demo was released at the band's first show, opening for melodic death metal act In Flames, in November 1999. In 2000 the band made their first appearances at the New England Metal and Hardcore Festival and Hellfest. Later that same year they released their self-titled debut album. Although initially the album was not a financial success, it attracted the interest of Carl Severson, who worked at Roadrunner Records at the time. Severson handed Killswitch Engage to several Roadrunner representatives. Mike Gitter, a talent agent of the company, contacted D'Antonio, attended several of the band's shows, and offered the band a recording contract with Roadrunner. Believing Roadrunner to have the resources to promote and distribute Killswitch Engage releases, the band accepted his offer, declining several offers from smaller labels.

=== Lineup changes and Alive or Just Breathing (2001–2004) ===
Ex-Overcast guitarist Pete Cortese briefly joined Killswitch Engage in 2000, but left when he became a father in 2001. Killswitch Engage began writing new material for their second album in November 2001. Mixed in January at Backstage Studios by producer Andy Sneap, the album was titled Alive or Just Breathing, after lyrics in the song "Just Barely Breathing". A music video for the single "My Last Serenade" increased the band's exposure, and the album peaked at number 37 on the Top Heatseekers chart. The band then embarked on their First Nationwide tour in 2002 in support of the album.

Following Alive or Just Breathing's release, the band expanded to a fivesome; Dutkiewicz moved to guitar and former Aftershock drummer Tom Gomes filled in the vacant drummer position. After Leach was married on April 20, 2002 and began touring again, he fell into a depression, which affected his performances. Leach's screaming vocals came across more emotionally driven instead of powerful, and while on tour, he would spend long hours in the tour bus only to come out to perform the shows and immediately retreat back to the bus. Leach left the band a few days before Killswitch Engage was meant to play a show and sent the band members an email telling them he had quit. Leach remarked, "I didn't have the mental energy to face them, or even call them on the phone. Rather, I was at a point in my life where I just didn't want to face any of them so I wrote them a long email explaining, like, I'm just done." D'Antonio said in an interview that "after three years of hanging out with the dude, and considering him a brother, to just get an email was a little bit harsh".

The band immediately started to search for a replacement vocalist and found Howard Jones of Blood Has Been Shed. Jones disliked the band's sound when he first heard it. He commented, "I was like, 'Meh.' I come from hardcore and dirtier metal, and Killswitch sounded so clean. But the more I listened to it, I realized there's some really good songs here". After hearing about Leach's vocal problems, Jones contacted the band and was accepted as the replacement. Philip Labonte of All That Remains tried out for lead vocals but lost to Jones, who had to quickly memorize seven songs for his debut at the 2002 Hellfest. Bleeding Through vocalist Brandan Schieppati said that both he and James Hart of Eighteen Visions were also asked to try out for the band in 2002, though Hart denied this.

The new lineup played on the Road Rage tour in Europe in 2002 with 36 Crazyfists and Five Pointe O. Touring continued through the New Year's Day, and in 2003 the first song to feature Jones, "When Darkness Falls", appeared on the soundtrack of the 2003 horror film Freddy vs. Jason. The band also embarked on their first Japanese tour that same year. Following the 2003 Ozzfest, drummer Gomes left the band because he wished to spend more time with his wife, to pursue his band Something of a Silhouette, and because he was tired of touring. He was replaced by Justin Foley of Blood Has Been Shed, and Foley's first tour with the band was the MTV2 Headbangers Ball in 2003.

=== The End of Heartache (2004–2006) ===
The End of Heartache was released on May 11, 2004, and was the band’s first commercial success with it peaking at number 21 on the Billboard 200 with 38,000 sales in its first week, and it also peaked at number 39 on the Australian Albums Chart. The album went on to sell more than 500,000 copies in the U.S and was certified gold on December 7, 2007. The album received mostly positive reviews, with Jon Caramanica of Rolling Stone calling the album a "stunning collection, retaining much of their signature musical brutality". Eduardo Rivadavia of AllMusic commented "riffs upon riffs are piled sky-high into each number that follows, it's the unpredictable rhythmic shifts used to build and then relieve internal pressure that fuel the Killswitch Engage power source". Killswitch Engage won top honors for best album at the 2004 Metal Hammer Golden Gods Awards.

"The End of Heartache" became the main single for the movie Resident Evil: Apocalypse, and in 2005 the song was nominated for Best Metal Performance for the 47th Grammy Awards. In late 2004, The End of Heartache was re-released as a special edition album, with a second disc featuring various live performances, a Japanese bonus track, and a re-recorded version of "Irreversal". The band also took part in the Jägermeister Tour alongside Slayer. In early 2005, Killswitch Engage took part in the inaugural Taste of chaos tour alongside My Chemical Romance and The Used. During the summer of that same year, the band returned for Ozzfest, and on November 1, 2005, Alive or Just Breathing was re-released as part of Roadrunner Records' 25th anniversary. On November 22, 2005, the live DVD (Set This) World Ablaze was released, which contained a live concert at the Palladium in Worcester, Massachusetts, an hour-long documentary, and all the band's music videos. The DVD was certified gold in the US on April 8, 2006. The End of Heartache is often credited with boosting Killswitch Engage in popularity and establishing them as a household name. Jesse Leach has spotlighted The End of Heartache as the turning point for the band’s global impact. In a 2019 interview, Dutkiewicz stated, “We grew as musicians and band members, and having Howard was such an amazing thing because his pipes are amazing. It was a whole new world that opened up so many possibilities and potentials, so I think we did step it up. It was a good time for us." On December 15, 2005, Jesse Leach reunited with the band to sing "My Last Serenade" alongside Howard Jones at the Roadrunner United concert at the Nokia Theater in New York City.

=== As Daylight Dies (2006–2007) ===
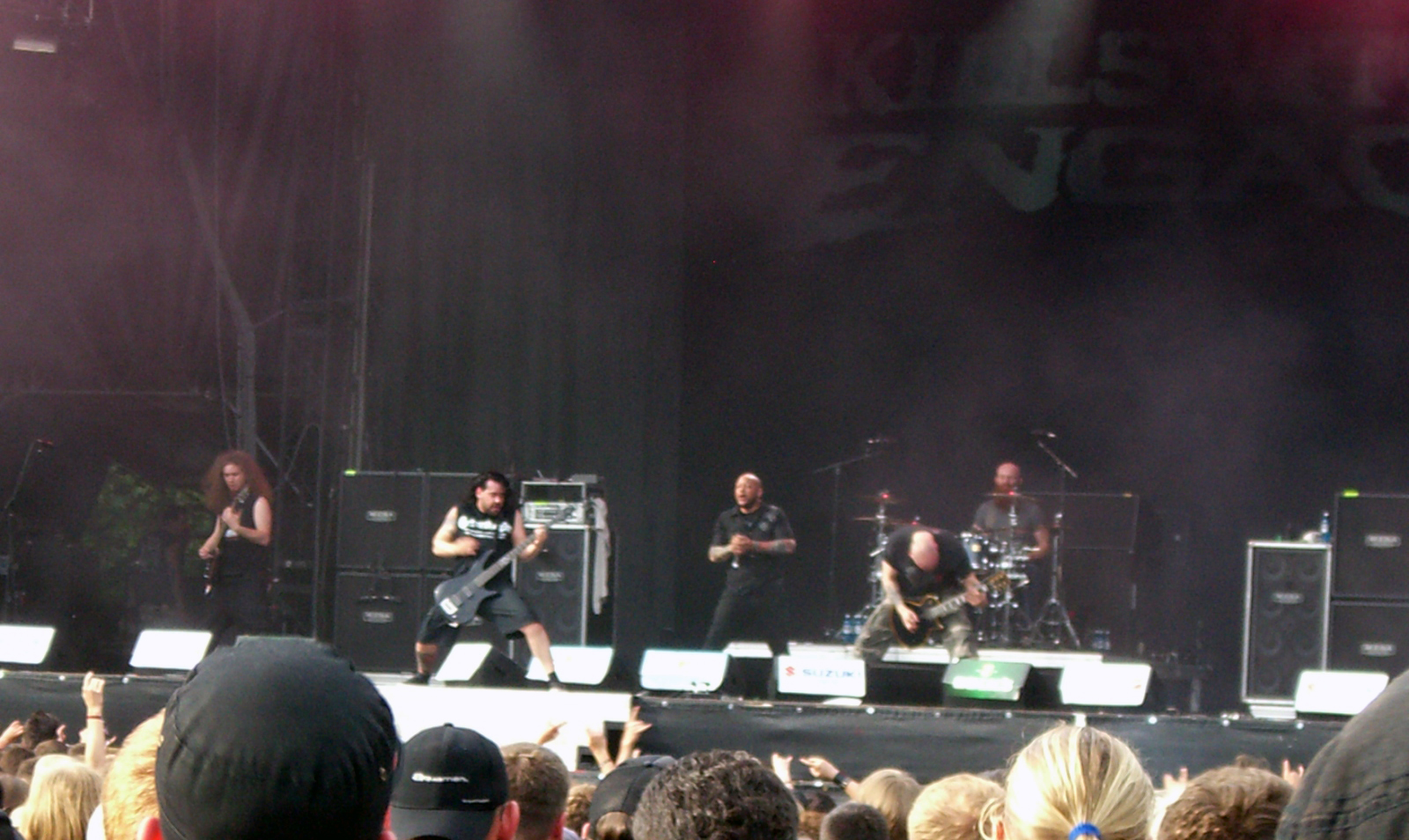
Killswitch Engage performing in 2007

Killswitch Engage played the Reading and Leeds Festivals in August 2006, having already played Australian dates without Dutkiewicz, who was suffering from back problems and needed corrective surgery. On May 23, 2006, the song "This Fire Burns" was released on the WWE Wreckless Intent album. The track was intended to be the new theme song for WWE wrestler Randy Orton; however, it was scrapped and later became the theme song for the WWE Judgment Day 2006 pay-per-view. "This Fire Burns" was used as the entrance theme for WWE wrestler CM Punk (along with his stables the Straight Edge Society and The New Nexus) from 2006 until 2011 and was later re-released as "This Fire" on the As Daylight Dies Special Edition.

Recorded in three months, As Daylight Dies was released on November 21, 2006 and peaked at number 32 on the Billboard 200 chart with 60,000 sales in its first week. As Daylight Dies proved to be one of their biggest albums yet. It also entered the Australian Albums Chart at number 29 and charted in the top 100 in 5 other countries. Mixed by Dutkiewicz, the album received mostly positive reviews—Thom Jurek of Allmusic called it "a Top Five metal candidate for 2006 for sure". Decibel Magazine contributor Nick Terry said "To call As Daylight Dies addictive would be an understatement. That it outdoes its already impressive enough predecessor could almost go without saying". Cosmo Lee of Stylus Magazine commented "the album is astonishingly badly sequenced", though he praised the album as being "less emotionally heavy-handed, and a lot more fun". The album has sold over 1 million copies in the U.S. and was certified platinum on November 23, 2021.

The album's first single, "My Curse", peaked at number 21 on the Hot Mainstream Rock Tracks chart, and is featured in the video games Sleeping Dogs, Guitar Hero III: Legends of Rock, Burnout Dominator and Burnout Paradise and is available as downloadable content for the Rock Band series. "The Arms of Sorrow" peaked at number 31 on the same chart. The band's cover of Dio's "Holy Diver", originally recorded for a Kerrang! compilation album titled High Voltage, peaked at number 12 on the Mainstream Rock charts. Early in 2007, the band had to cancel three of its European tour dates with The Haunted due to Dutkiewicz's back problems. He required emergency back surgery and was replaced on the tour by Soilwork guitarist Peter Wichers.

Due to Dutkiewicz's back problems in early 2007, he was replaced by Damageplan and The Mercy Clinic frontman Patrick Lachman during the No Fear Tour. Dutkiewicz recovered and was able to finish the No Fear tour, and the band began filming its video for As Daylight Dies's second single, "The Arms of Sorrow". On August 6, 2007, Dutkiewicz was forced to leave the Warped Tour so he could fully recover from his back surgery and continue daily physical therapy. He was replaced by Killswitch's guitar technician Josh Mihlek for select songs, until his return on August 14, 2007. In October they toured Europe, then embarking on a US co headlining tour with Lamb of God in the Winter.

=== Second self-titled album (2007–2011) ===
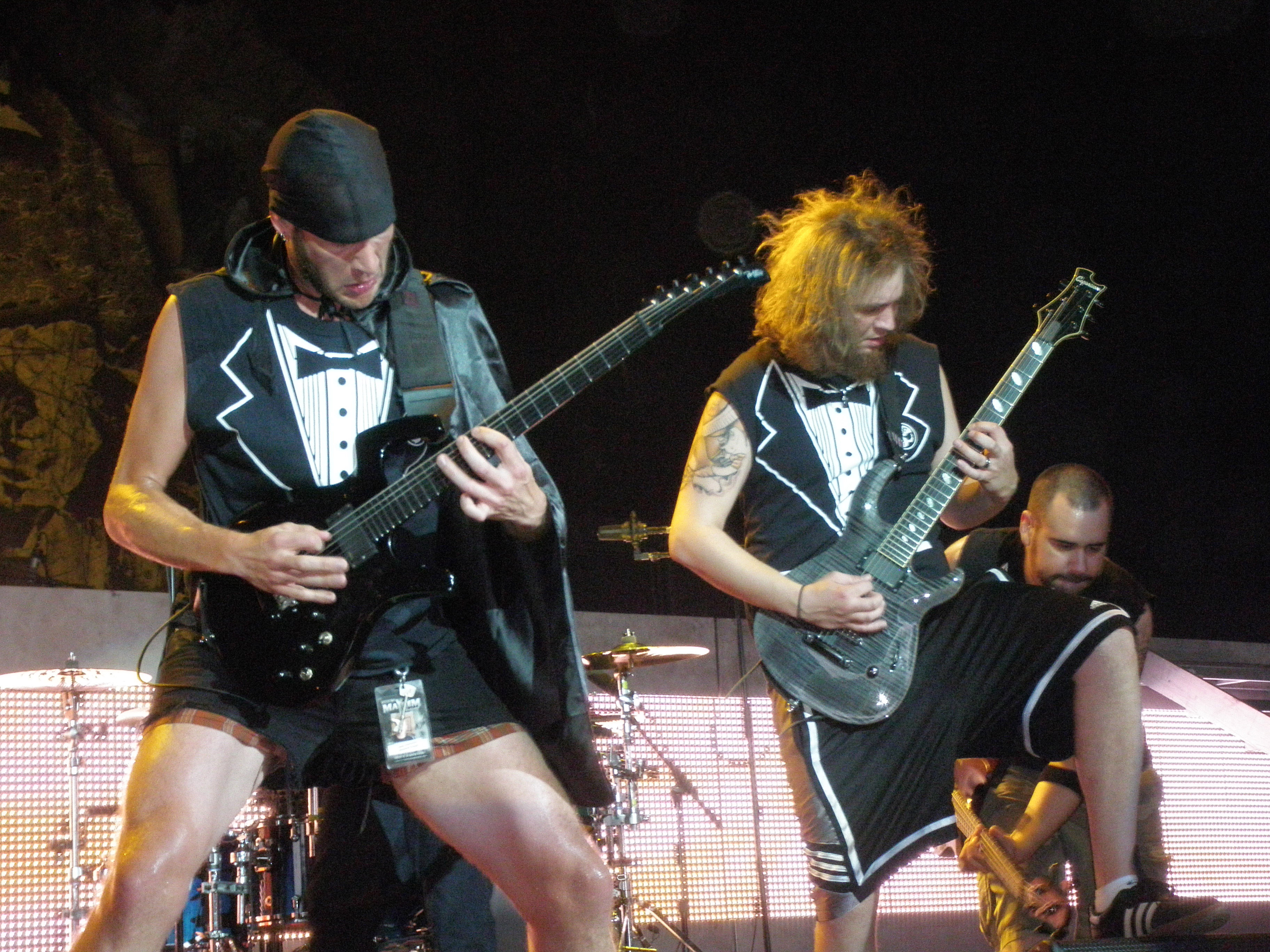
Guitarists Adam Dutkiewicz and Joel Stroetzel, 2009

In early 2008, the band embarked on a US headlining tour and an Australian leg. In March they made their first appearance at Dubai Desert Rock Festival. The touring cycle continued with a US headlining tour in May of 2008, alongside Throwdown. They then finished the cycle with European festival appearances in June and July after which they began working on the follow up to As Daylight Dies. Killswitch Engage entered the studio in October 2008 to start recording their next album with Dutkiewicz and Brendan O'Brien co-producing the album. In mid-February, bassist Mike D'Antonio confirmed in an interview with Metal Hammer that "drums were finished", and that he had "finished up the last few bass fixes". He also stated that Howard [Jones] was in Atlanta finishing vocals, and that "it shouldn't be too much longer now". From March to May, Killswitch Engage was a part of Disturbed's Music as a Weapon IV festival along with Lacuna Coil, Chimaira, Suicide Silence, Bury Your Dead and more. On April 14, the band announced the name of their album as Killswitch Engage, the second time the band has self-titled an album. The album was released on June 30, 2009, and was their biggest commercial success at that point, debuting at number 7 on the Billboard 200, marking the band's highest chart position for an album.

It was also the band’s first release to top the Hard Rock Albums Billboard, along with charting in 10+ other countries. in July and August, Killswitch Engage took part in Mayhem Festival with headliners Marilyn Manson, Slayer, Bullet for My Valentine, and others. Later that year, they embarked on their first tour in South America. In February 2010, Killswitch Engage announced that vocalist Howard Jones would not be performing with Killswitch Engage during their winter tour with The Devil Wears Prada and Dark Tranquillity; during the time, All That Remains vocalist Philip Labonte was substituting for Jones until he could return. At least one source speculated that Jones's hiatus was due to back pain. On March 18, 2010, original vocalist Jesse Leach returned to the band for a series of songs. From then on, Leach and Labonte performed as substitute vocalists for the remainder of the tour.

In 2010, the band contributed the track "My Obsession" to the God of War: Blood & Metal soundtrack. The band was later added as late replacement to 2010's Download Festival in June, after original sub-headliner, Wolfmother could not attend as scheduled. Afterward, Killswitch Engage took a break from the road, and its members pursued other interests. Adam Dutkiewicz formed the band Times of Grace with Leach and released the band's debut album The Hymn of a Broken Man on January 18, 2011. Along with Dutkiewicz and Leach, Times of Grace added Joel Stroetzel to their tour lineup. Justin Foley provided the drum tracking for the band Unearth on their album "Darkness in the Light", released on July 5, 2011. Foley also traveled with the band for their 2011 summer tour. D'Antonio started the hardcore band Death Ray Vision, with Shadows Fall vocalist Brian Fair and former Killswitch Engage guitarist Pete Cortese.

=== Jones's departure, Leach's return and Disarm the Descent (2011–2015) ===
In an interview with FTC, Gun Shy Assassin, D'Antonio had stated that the band was currently in the works for a sixth studio album: "Currently, everyone is individually writing demos for the next Killswitch Engage record. There is no release date yet, but I would assume it will be out early 2012." Dutkiewicz followed that up with a statement on the Killswitch Engage Facebook, saying "YO! Its Adam D! We're about to begin writing our new record. Thanks to all of our fans for waiting so friggin' patiently...now let's turn on the 'riff faucet' and RAGE!" On December 1, 2011, D'Antonio posted online that Killswitch Engage should be entering the studio around February/March 2012 to record their sixth album expected around summer 2012. He also stated that the band had eight demos finished for the new record.

On January 4, 2012, the band announced that Howard Jones had left the band. The band did not disclose the reason for this decision out of respect for Jones but simply thanked him for his nine years with the band and wished him well, as well as thanking the fans for their support as they began the search for a new lead singer; Jones later explained that he departed the band to manage his type 2 diabetes, which was worsened by a hectic touring lifestyle. Soon after the announcement of Jones's departure, rumors began that Phil Labonte of All That Remains would officially take over lead vocals due to his previous history with the band, although Labonte quickly dispelled the rumor. Many vocalists were considered in the search for a new one for the band. In February, the band announced that original lead vocalist Jesse Leach would return to the band, as the band felt that Leach's energy, as well as his overall comfort and command of both the old and new material, made him the clear choice during auditions. Following Leach's return, the band continued to the process of recording their new album and touring. On April 22, 2012, the band performed Leach's first show since 2002 at the New England Metal and Hardcore Fest.

On June 20, 2012, the demo version of a new song titled "This Is Confrontation" was leaked on YouTube. Not long after the song was leaked, the videos were soon deleted. Later, the band took part in Metal Hammer's "Trespass America Festival" headlined by Five Finger Death Punch with additional support from God Forbid, Emmure, Pop Evil, Trivium and Battlecross. The band performed this song live, confirming the song's title "No End in Sight". Not long after the album was confirmed, the song was streamed publicly again. In October 2012, the band announced they would be celebrating the ten-year anniversary of their seminal album Alive or Just Breathing with a US tour through November/December 2012, in which the band played the album live in its entirety. Support on the tour came from fellow Massachusetts natives Shadows Fall and Acaro.

The album Disarm the Descent was released on April 1, 2013 in the UK, and April 2 in the US. The album debuted at number 15 on the UK Albums Chart, while debuting at number 7 on the Billboard 200. The first single "In Due Time" was released on February 5, 2013. The album has received critical acclaim from reviewers, and has been labeled as a "true standout" and "nothing short of amazing". It was announced in December 2013 that "In Due Time" was nominated for "Best Metal Performance" at the 2014 Grammy Awards, but lost to "God Is Dead?" by Black Sabbath. A tour in May 2013 was done to promote the new album, with Miss May I, Darkest Hour, The Word Alive and Affiance as support. As I Lay Dying was originally supposed to be on the tour, but dropped out due to criminal charges against frontman Tim Lambesis. The band also did a co-headliner with Lamb of God in October 2013, with Testament and Huntress as support. The band did a small headliner on the East Coast for Halloween 2014, with All That Remains, Death Ray Vision and City of Homes supporting. In total the Disarm the Descent World Tour went from 2013 to 2014 lasting 166 dates, covering 36 countries.

=== Incarnate (2015–2017) ===
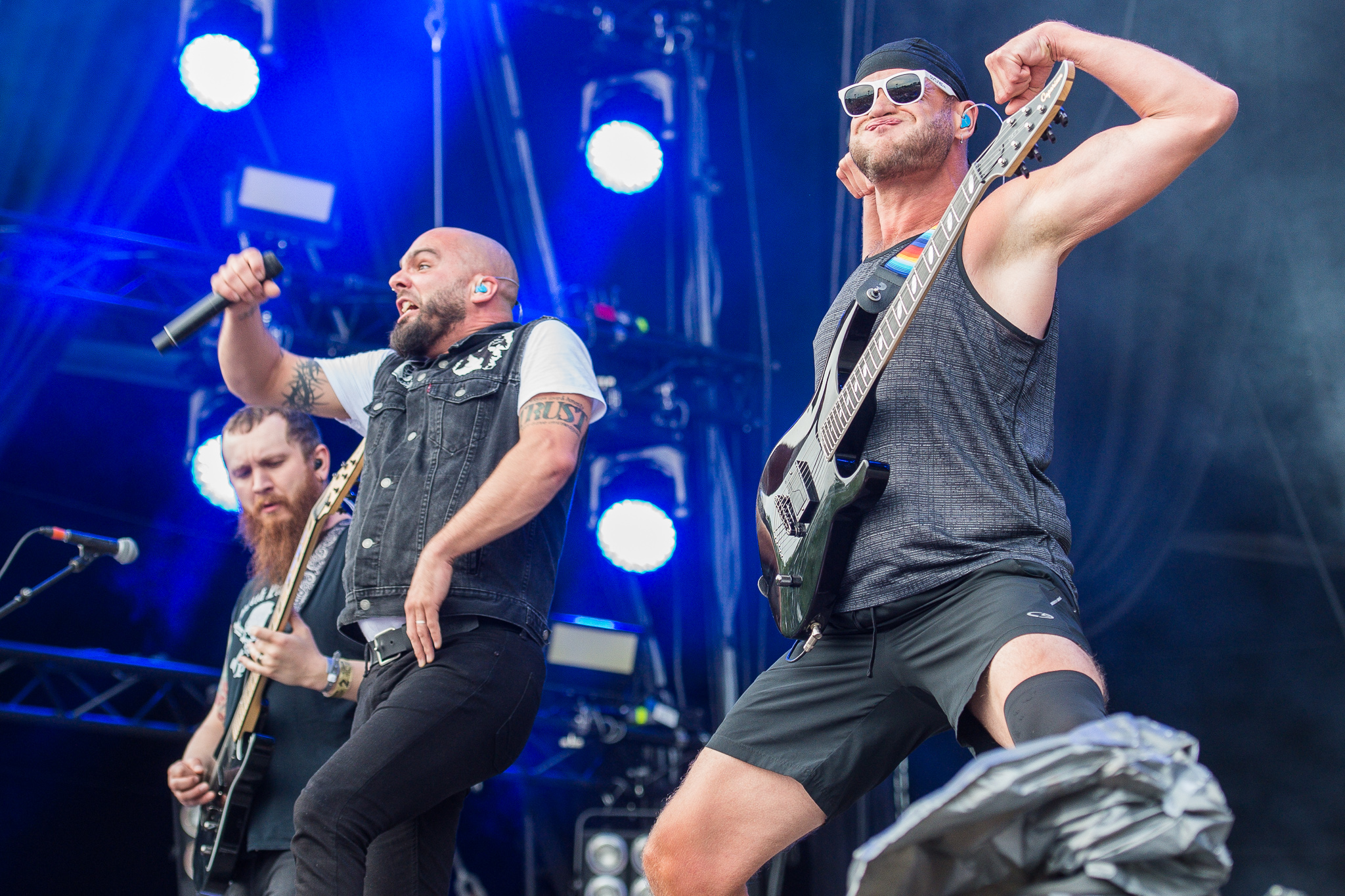
Killswitch Engage at Rock im Park 2016

In an interview with Wikimetal, Jesse Leach announced that the band will start demoing new material "in the coming months".

On February 25, 2015, the band released a 40-second snippet of a new single titled "Loyalty". The track appears on the Catch The Throne: The Mixtape Volume 2 to promote the HBO TV series Game of Thrones. The mixtape also features appearances from various other metal and rap acts such as Anthrax and Snoop Dogg.

On March 30, 2015, D'Antonio stated that the band had completed demoing material for its next studio album.

Killswitch Engage took part in a summer tour in July 2015, opening up for Rise Against with support from letlive.

On December 10, 2015, the band premiered a new song entitled "Strength of the Mind" on Revolver. The band also did a small Christmas 2015 tour on the East Coast with Unearth, Act of Defiance and '68.

On December 16, 2015, it was revealed that the band's upcoming seventh album, released on March 11, 2016, would be titled Incarnate, with a tour being took part in March of that year with Memphis May Fire and 36 Crazyfists as supporters. The album saw the band's best commercial performance as it peaked at number 6 on the Billboard 200, number 5 in Australia, number 4 in Canada along with charting in the top 10 in 4 additional countries. The album was met with positive reception. Thom Jurek from AllMusic awarded the album a score of 3.5/5, stating that "as a whole, Incarnate improves on the creativity and restlessness offered by Disarm the Descent. There is a lot more ambition, confidence and above all, passion here. In August and September of 2016 Killswitch Engage toured North America alongside Volbeat. This was followed by a US leg with Avenged Sevenfold and Volbeat.

On September 27, 2016, Leach revealed on his Instagram page that the band would be releasing a documentary compiled of live footage since 2012. On November 25, 2016, the band released a Blu-ray/CD called Beyond The Flames: Home Video Vol. 2. The Blu-ray contains live performances that were recorded around the world from 2012 to 2016 and an hour long documentary taking place right after the band's (Set This) World Ablaze had left off, as well as music videos, band member profiles and more, plus a bonus live CD containing live tracks from the band's legendary 2014 Monster Mosh show. The two disc set had a one day exclusive sale in record stores everywhere on Black Friday. The set is now available for online purchase and digital download on the Killswitch Engage store. In Late 2016, the band supported Bullet for My Valentine on a European tour.

=== Atonement (2017–2023) ===
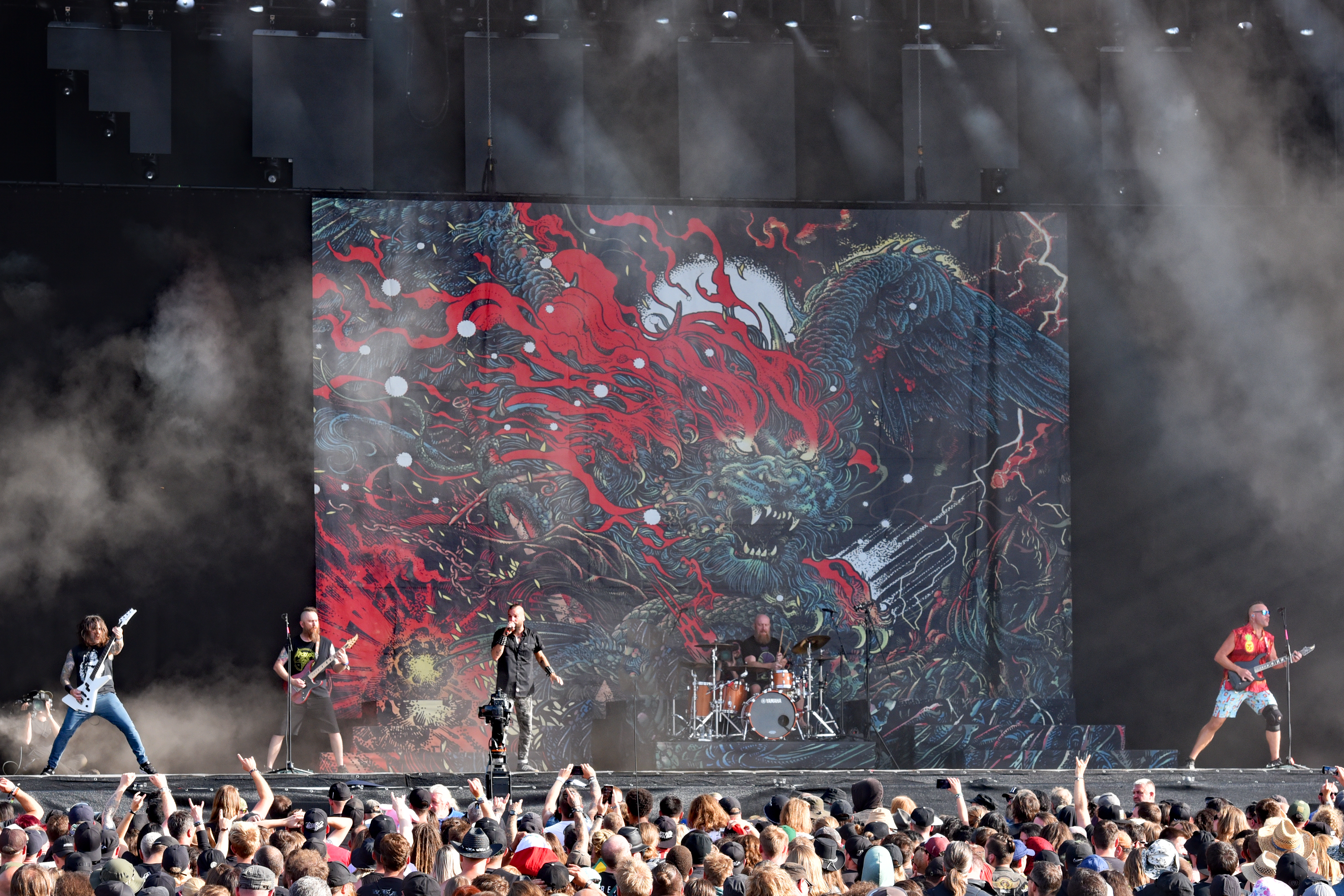
Killswitch Engage at Wacken Open Air 2023

In March of 2017, the band toured Australia / New Zealand in celebration of Alive or Just Breathing 15th anniversary playing it in its entirety.Fallujah served as support. Following this Killswitch Engage embarked on an extensive North American co headlining tour with Anthrax in the Spring dubbed the "Killthrax Tour." On August 30, 2017, the band announced on their Instagram page that they were in the process of demoing material for their upcoming eighth studio album.

Due to the success of the first Killthrax tour with Anthrax the two went on a second tour North American co headlining tour together in early 2018. In April 2018, it was revealed that their former singer Howard Jones would appear on their new album performing a duet with Leach for the song "The Signal Fire".

The band cancelled their tour dates from April 26 to May 5 due to Leach undergoing surgery on his vocal cords. Following his successful surgery, the band then supported Iron Maiden on their Legacy of The Best World Tour from May to August. While on the tour Leach began to experience writer’s block. By the end of tour, Dutkiewicz took him aside and offered words of inspiration. Leach recalled, “I shared my unfinished lyrics, and he said, 'You don’t even need all of these. Keep it simple.'" Leach added, "I was stressed out. I was insecure. A lot was going on in my head between writer’s block and the surgery. It was amazing to have a friend and producer like Adam mentally slap me upside the face and encourage me." On June 4, 2018, it was announced that the band had signed with Metal Blade Records to release their next album, after releasing their previous six albums through RoadRunner.

During an interview with the Wall of Sound: Up Against the Wall podcast in October 2018, Jesse Leach revealed more details about the song with former singer Howard Jones stating, "He does a verse. I do a verse. We sing the chorus together. It's a real heavy shitkicker." He also mentioned that the song was inspired by Howard's new band name Light the Torch and their friendship. On April 24, 2019, the band posted on their Instagram that the follow-up to the 2016 album Incarnate would be released in the autumn. During the spring of 2019, the band went on tour an co headlining tour alongside Parkway Drive dubbed the "Collapse the World Tour."

According to Music Week, the band has signed with Metal Blade Records for the US, Music for Nations for the UK, and an international contract with Columbia/Sony. These labels released the band's eighth studio album, Atonement, on August 16, 2019. The album sold 33,000 copies in its first week and peaked at number 13 on the Billboard 200, topped both the Independent Albums chart and Digital Albums chart Billboard and charted in the top 20 in 8 other countries. The album was met with positive reviews, praising the album for its powerful, emotional songwriting, the blend of brutal aggression and melodic hooks. On August 20, 2019, the band released their music video for Atonement's third single "The Signal Fire", the song they recorded with former frontman Howard Jones (now of Light the Torch). In November 2019, the track "Unleashed" was nominated for "Best Metal Performance", at that year’s Grammys, making it the third Grammy nomination for band.

On May 1, 2020, the band released an EP titled Atonement II: B-Sides for Charity, containing six songs that were recorded during the Atonement sessions, but did not make the album. The EP was released on Bandcamp and sold as a "pay what you want" price, with all proceeds going to the Center for Disaster Philanthropy's COVID-19 Relief Fund.

On July 15, 2021, the band announced a live stream to air on August 6 in which the band would perform their debut album and their latest album, Atonement, in their entirety at the Worcester Palladium. The live stream was recorded and released as a live album on June 3, 2022, titled Live at the Palladium.

In 2022, the band began touring regularly again, rescheduling their North American tour alongside August Burns Red and Light the Torch.

In 2023, the band headlined the Bloodstock Open Air festival in August and a went on a joint tour with Lamb of God in North America in September and October.

=== This Consequence (2024–present) ===
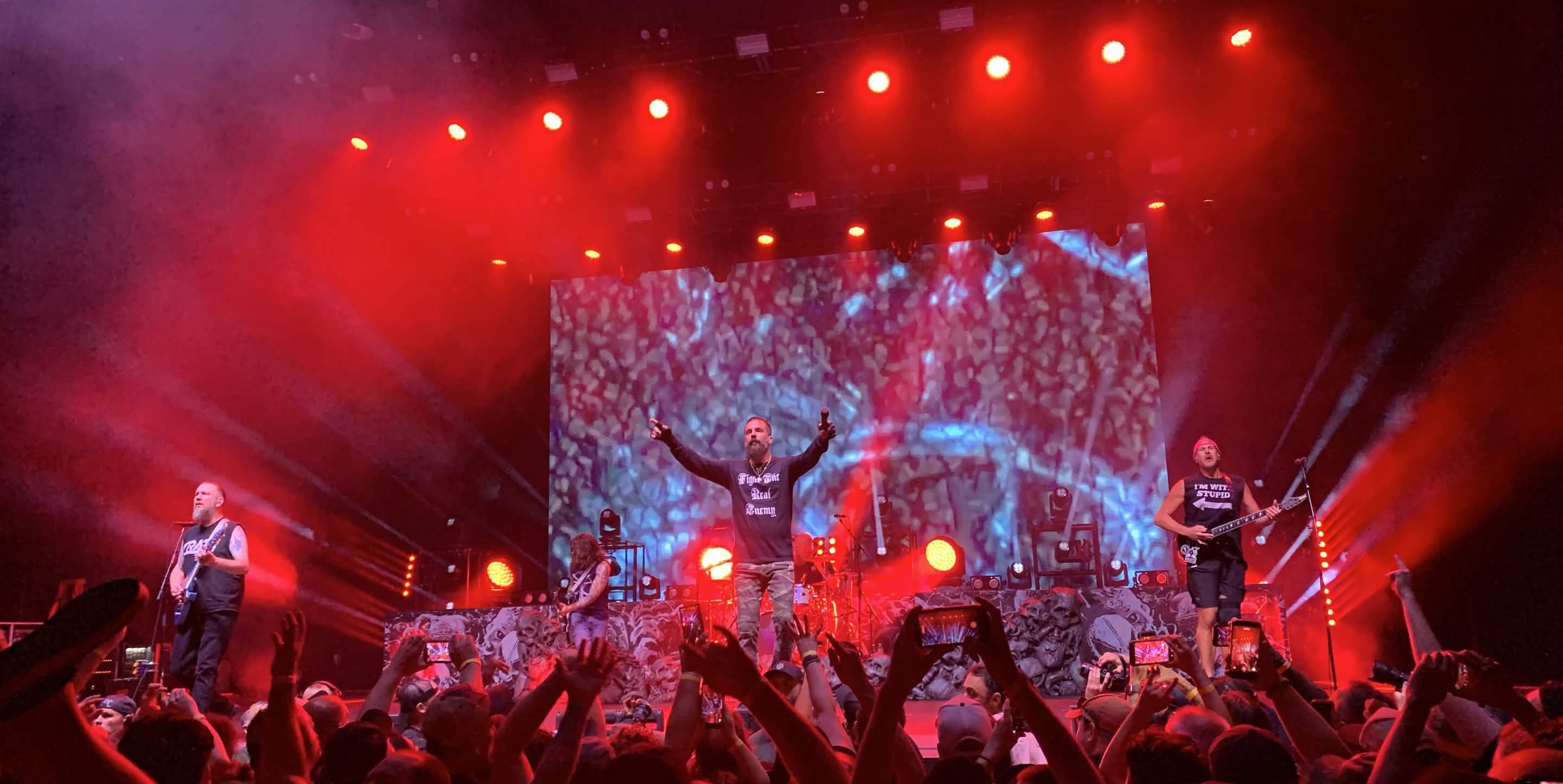
Killswitch Engage live in Boston, Massachusetts 2026

In September 2024, the band celebrated their 25th anniversary at the New England Metal & Hardcore Fest with a special show at the Palladium in Worcester, MA, featuring a reunion with Howard Jones. They also supported Iron Maiden on the Australian leg of their The Future Past tour. In October 2024, the band teamed up with Revolver Magazine to release a collector's edition deluxe magazine that shares the bands 25-year history. In November 2024, the band released the single "Forever Aligned" and confirmed that they would release their ninth studio album, titled This Consequence, on February 21, 2025.

In January 2025, the band release the single "I Believe", which became the band’s first song to reach the top 10 on the US Mainstream Rock chart, peaking at number 4. On February 21, the band officially released This Consequence. The album was met with favorable reviews. Blabbermouth writer Dom Lawson gave it a score of 9/10 and stated, "The greatest bands stay great. This Consequence is a triumph." They then went on tour in support of the album with Kublai Khan TX, Fit For a King and Frozen Soul supporting them. On June 5, they released a B side from the album, “Blood Upon the Ashes”, as a part of The Dogs of Hope compilation, with the benefits supporting an animal shelter in Alabama. In October 2025, they embarked on a UK/Ireland tour, with Hatebreed and Fit For An Autopsy joining as support.

The band is scheduled to tour the US in the late Summer of 2026 with Machine Head, Iron Reagan, and Havok, while also headlining the Milwaukee Metal Fest. The tour will continue into Canada in August alongside Machine Head and Malevolence, and the US alongside Machine Head, Rivers of Nihil, Judiciary in September. The band is also confirmed to be on the roster for the Louder Than Life festival taking place in Louisville in September. During the Fall they will also be headlining an Australian tour.

== Musical style, influences, and lyrical themes ==
"My Last Serenade"
Sample of "My Last Serenade" from Alive or Just Breathing (2002).

"My Curse"
Sample of "My Curse" from As Daylight Dies (2006).

Killswitch Engage's musical style has been described as a blend of "New England hardcore and Swedish death metal", and has been categorized as metalcore and melodic metalcore. Like some 2000s metalcore bands, Killswitch Engage vocally combine singing, screaming vocals, and growls in their music. In 2009, MTV, while naming "The Greatest Metal Bands of All Time", said that Killswitch Engage have been "called one of the founders of metalcore". Jason D. Taylor of AllMusic said Alive or Just Breathing is "a pure metal album that seemingly has ignored any fashionable trend and instead relies solely on skill and expertise to sculpt some of the meatiest heavy metal since the glory days of Metallica and Slayer".

Both current vocalist Leach and former vocalist Howard Jones write lyrics that are considered positive. Leach stated on (Set This) World Ablaze, that the lyrics contain "unity, positivity, [and] love". On the lyrical themes of Killswitch Engage, Ultimate Guitar reviewer Amy Sciarretto noted:

Howard Jones has come into his own since 2004's The End of Heartache, and he continues to hit the notes, wax about relationships, faith-issues and other relatable issue [sic] on this second self-titled effort.

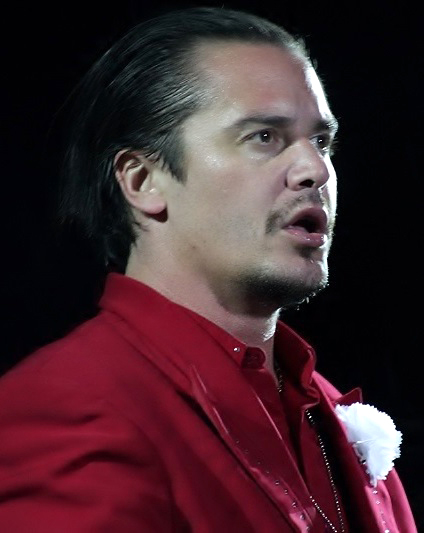
Mike Patton is a major vocal influence of Killswitch Engage.

Regarding the band's 2009 self-titled album, Howard Jones stated, "I've got enough to draw on to write some stuff that can be dark. Maybe there's still a hint of positivity in it, but there are some songs on there that are not positive at all."

Leach’s father was a minister, and some of his lyrics have been influenced by his Christian upbringing. In a 2025 interview, he stated, "Even though I don’t subscribe to organized religion anymore, I like using biblical words here and there to sort of tie in the themes.

Killswitch Engage's influences include Van Halen, Black Sabbath, Fear Factory, Carcass, At the Gates, Machine Head, Neurosis, Metallica, Iron Maiden, HIM, Megadeth, Suicidal Tendencies, Anthrax, Slayer, Testament, Bad Brains, Agnostic Front, Leeway, Cro-Mags and Sick of It All. Both Leach and Jones cited Faith No More singer Mike Patton as their biggest influence. Separately Leach has also cited Dan Swanö as a big inspiration as well.

Dutkiewicz has credited James Hetfield for shaping him as a guitarist, Justin Foley has cited Charlie Benante and “obscure” Russian classical composer as his influences. Joel Stroetzel guitar playing is inspired by Slayer and Zakk Wylde. Mike D’ Antonio has credited his bass style being influenced by Cliff Burton and Harley Flanagan, along with Swedish metal acts.

Leach has talked about the band's label of metalcore, stating: "I never liked the term 'metalcore.' I don't think it's an accurate representation of the wide variety of bands that get lumped under that category. But I get it. People have to categorize stuff and put it into their own little category so they can describe stuff to somebody else. I like to say we're more of a metal band. It is what it is. People are going to use that term whether I like it or not."

== Legacy ==
Killswitch Engage has sold over four million records in the US and has been considered notable within the New Wave of American Heavy Metal, having been referred to as one of "big four" bands of the movement, along with Shadows Fall, Lamb of God and Unearth. They have been considered among the big four of the metalcore genre alongside As I Lay Dying, The Dillinger Escape Plan and Converge. Their album Alive or Just Breathing is often cited as a landmark album for the genre, being considered a foundational and highly influential record that helped define the metalcore in its early years. Revolver Magazine stated "the album’s clean-chorus/screamed-verse structure has become the genre’s most distinguishing feature ever since, and an entire generation of bands followed in its footsteps ". Their third album The End of Heartache is credited with "kicking metalcore to the next level" as it showed the genre could be anthemic, emotional, and heavy, all at once.

The End of Heartache and As Daylight Dies also helped push metalcore to a wider more mainstream audience. Metal Hammer claimed that those two albums "buried nu metal and sparked the metalcore revolution". On top of this AllMusic has dubbed Killswitch Engage "one of heavy metal's most commercially successful and critically acclaimed acts". In 2021 Alive or Just Breathing made Revolver Magazine’s list of the Top 10 Most Influential Metalcore Albums of All Time, it was also dubbed one of the 75 best metal albums of all time by Consequence in 2025. Similarly The End of Heartache was ranked number 401 in Rock Hard magazine's book The 500 Greatest Rock & Metal Albums of All Time in 2005. Both albums also made Loudwire’s list of The 100 Best Rock/Metal Albums of the 21st Century in 2023.

Bands like All That Remains, Bring Me the Horizon, Bullet for My Valentine, Jinjer, the Word Alive, Rise to Remain, Miss May I The Ghost Inside, Parkway Drive, Impending Doom, Trivium and Bad Wolves, have cited Killswitch Engage as an influence. Forbes magazine wrote "Killswitch Engage paved the sonic roadmap for what a vast majority of modern metal would use for years to come".

Revolver Magazine stated "Simply put, they’re one of the most important metal bands of the 21st century." The band have been referred to as one of the most important/influential metal bands of the 21st century by other publications such as Loudwire and Hit Parader.

== Side projects ==
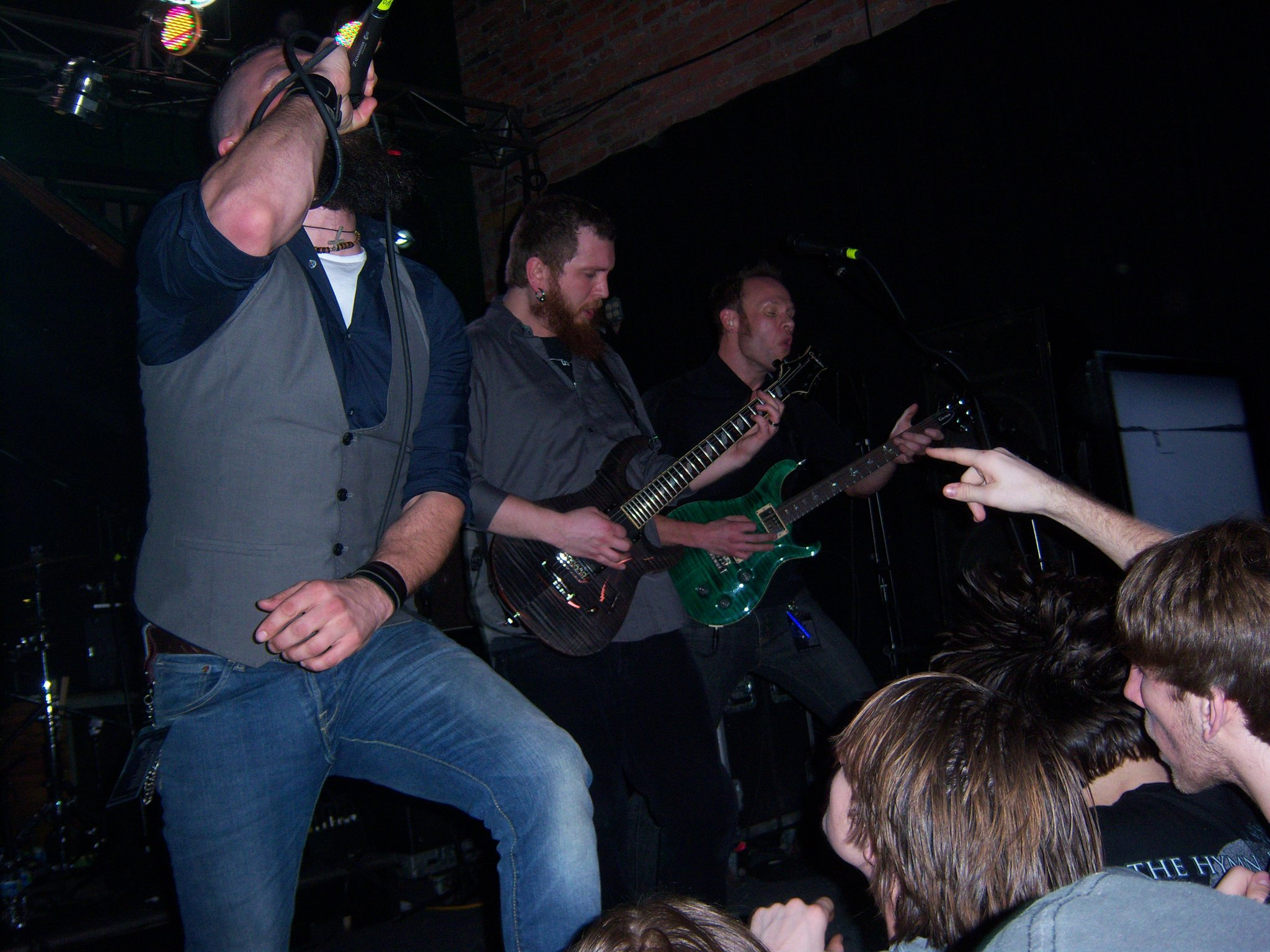
Jesse Leach, Joel Stroetzel and Adam Dutkiewicz performing as Times of Grace in 2011

While Dutkiewicz was recovering from his back injury in 2007, he wrote new material which he later recorded and demoed at home. Dutkiewicz later contacted Leach, who was away from Killswitch Engage at the time, about writing lyrics and recording vocals. This resulted in a side project called Times of Grace, which began recording material in 2008 and has since released two albums. Fellow bandmate Joel Stroetzel has also served as a touring member in the past. Dutkiewicz is also a record producer and has produced every single Killswitch Engage album besides their second self-titled in 2009.

D'Antonio is a graphic artist and has played a part in the design of all of Killswitch Engage's album artwork and tour merchandise. He also started his own band Death Ray Vision in 2011 and has since released three albums with the group.

In 2020, Foley started Lybica, a four-piece instrumental post-rock/metal band. His primary role is guitarist, but he played both guitar and drums on their self-titled album, which was released on September 16, 2022. Foley has also served as a freelance orchestral musician with many Connecticut symphony orchestras, such as the Waterbury Symphony and New Britain Symphony.

Jesse Leach has also sporadically made ambient music since 2014, and more recently has started featuring in other songs.

== Band members ==
Killswitch Engage live at Wacken Open Air 2023

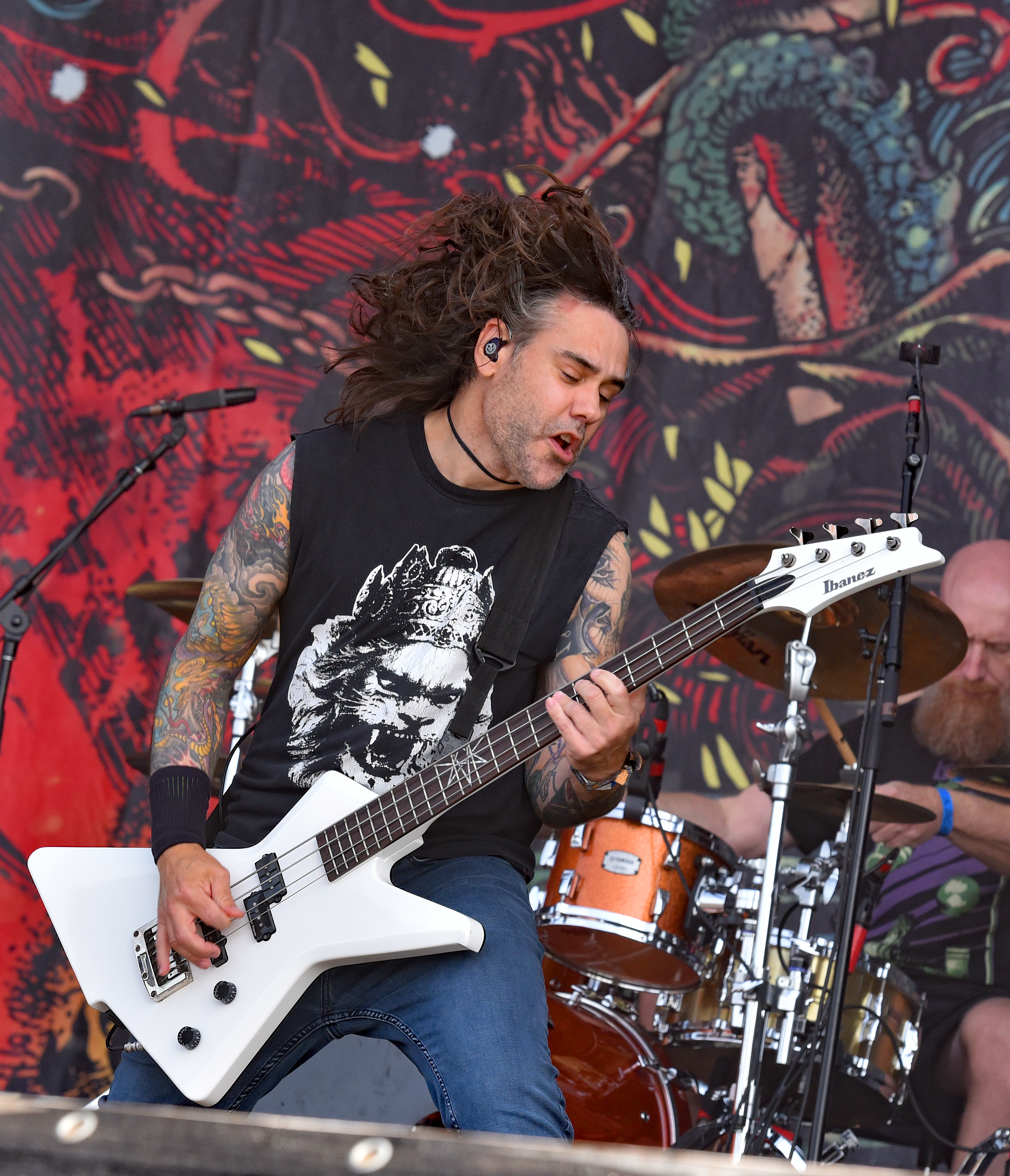
Mike D'Antonio

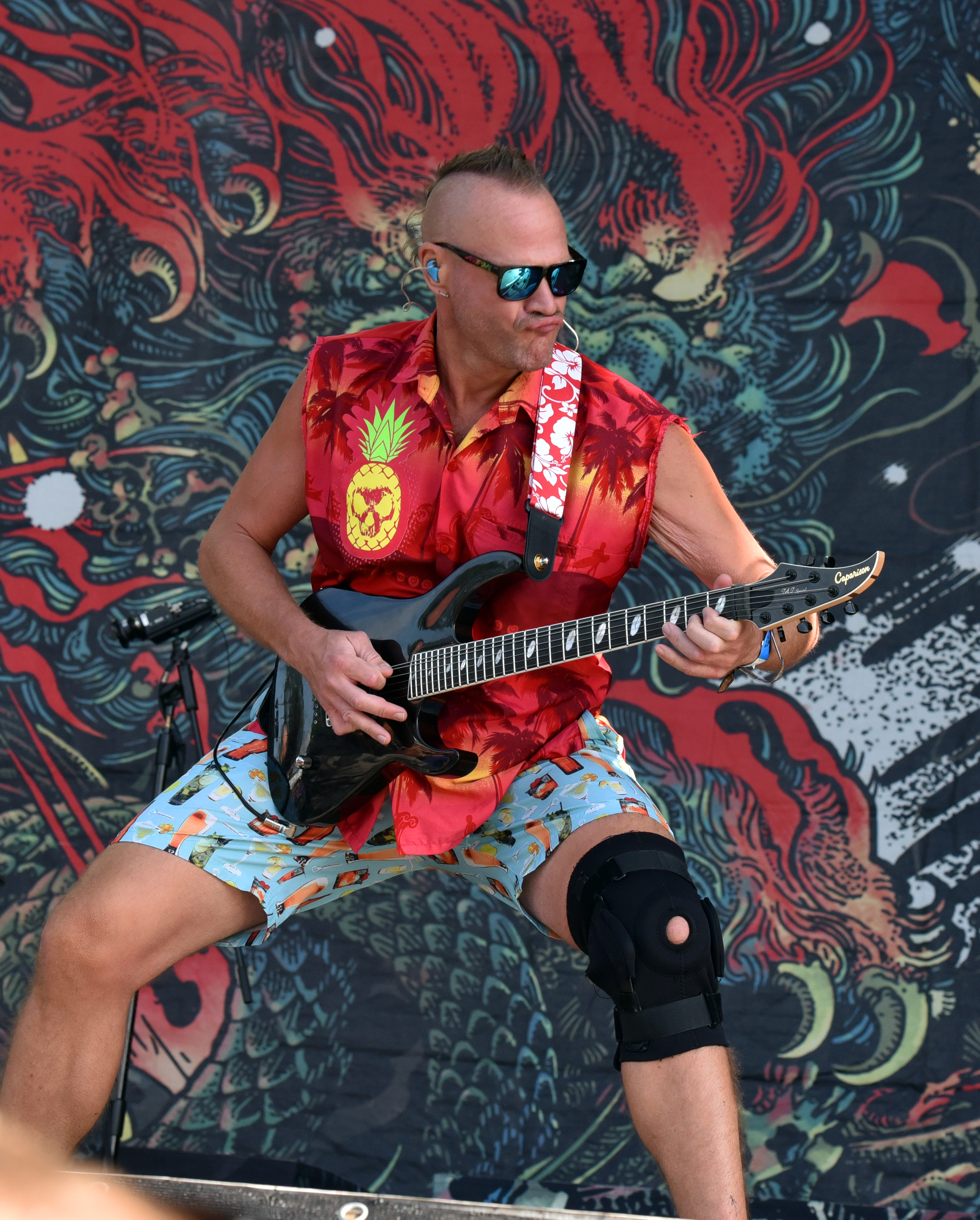
Adam Dutkiewicz

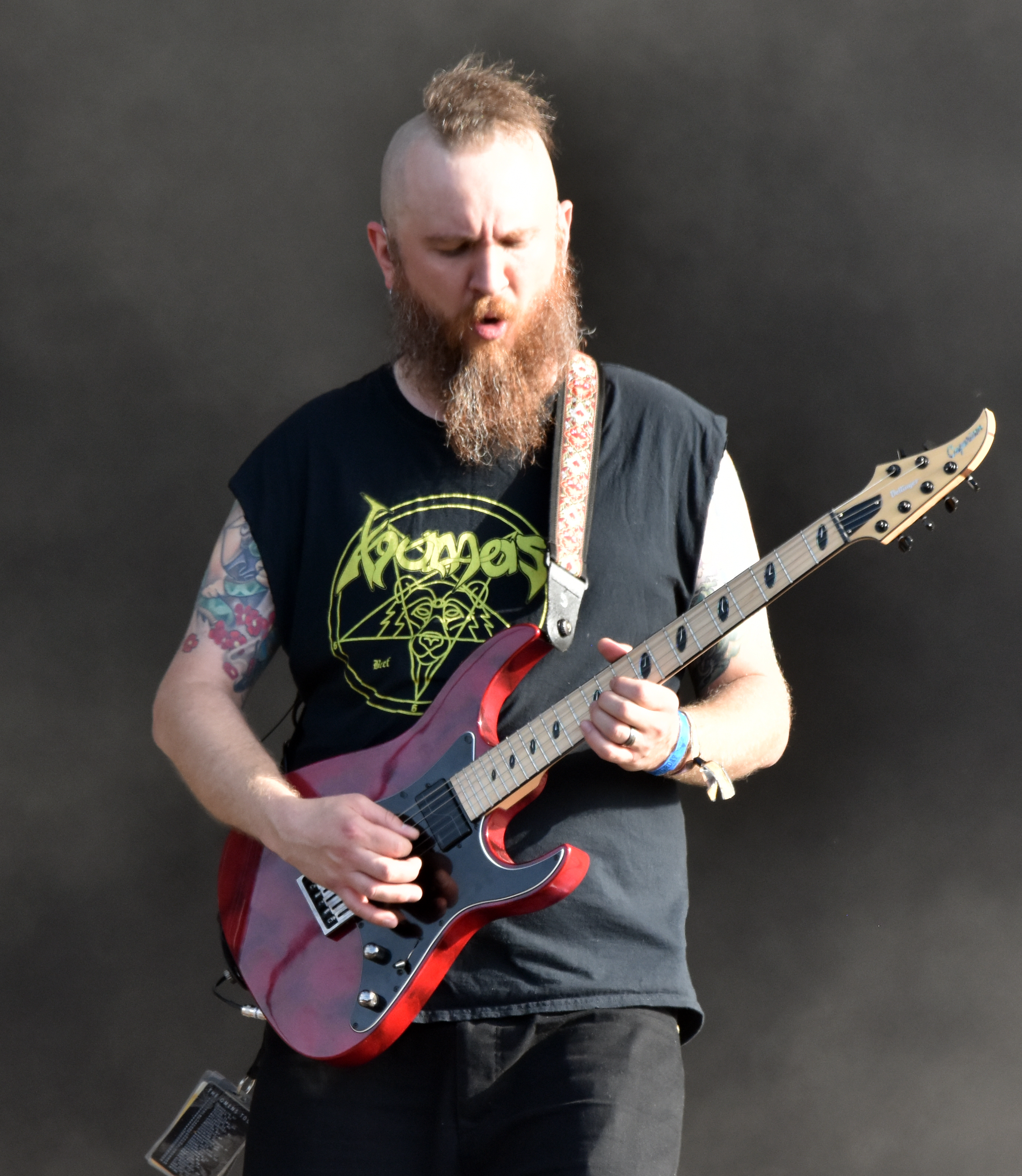
Joel Stroetzel

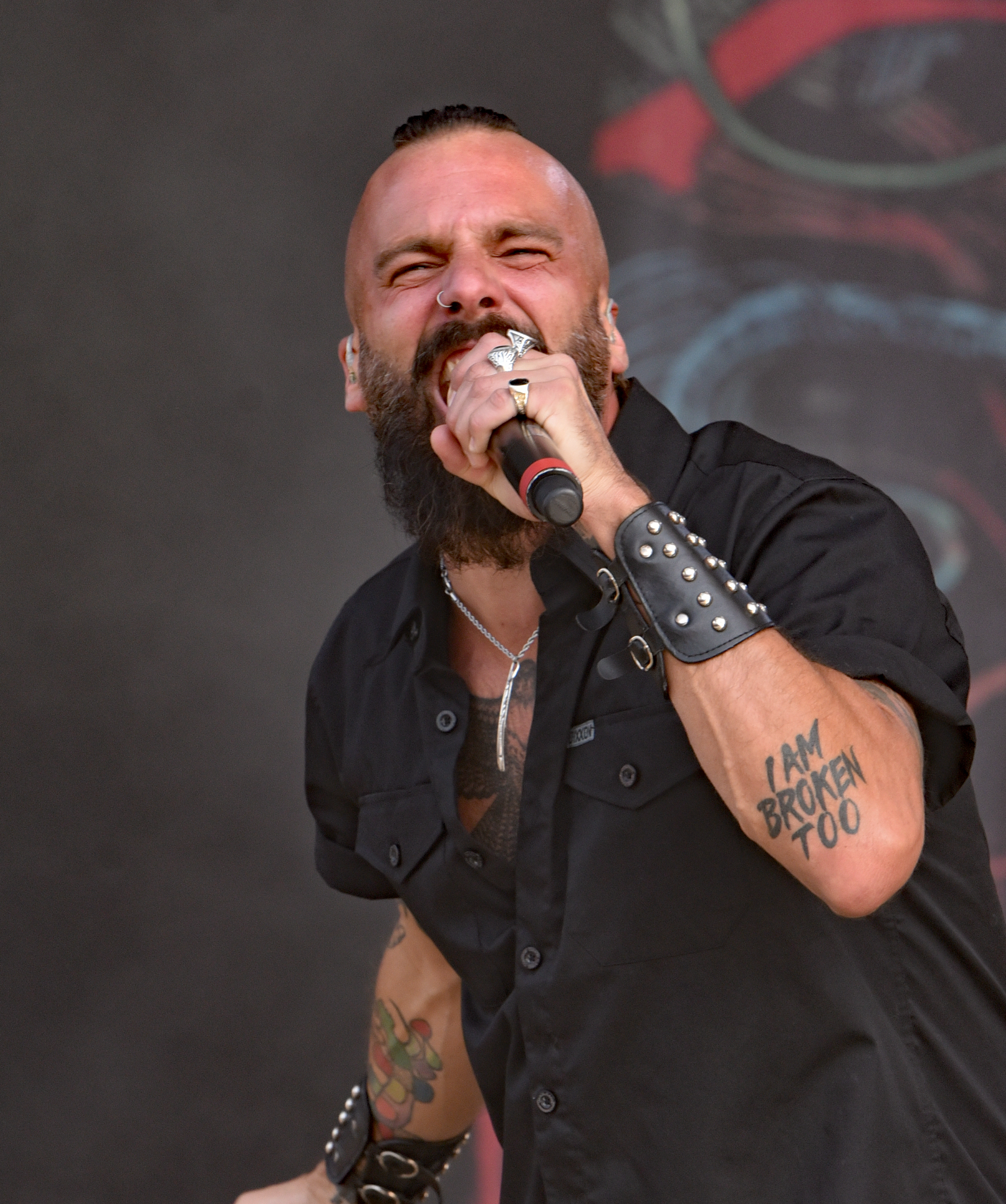
Jesse Leach

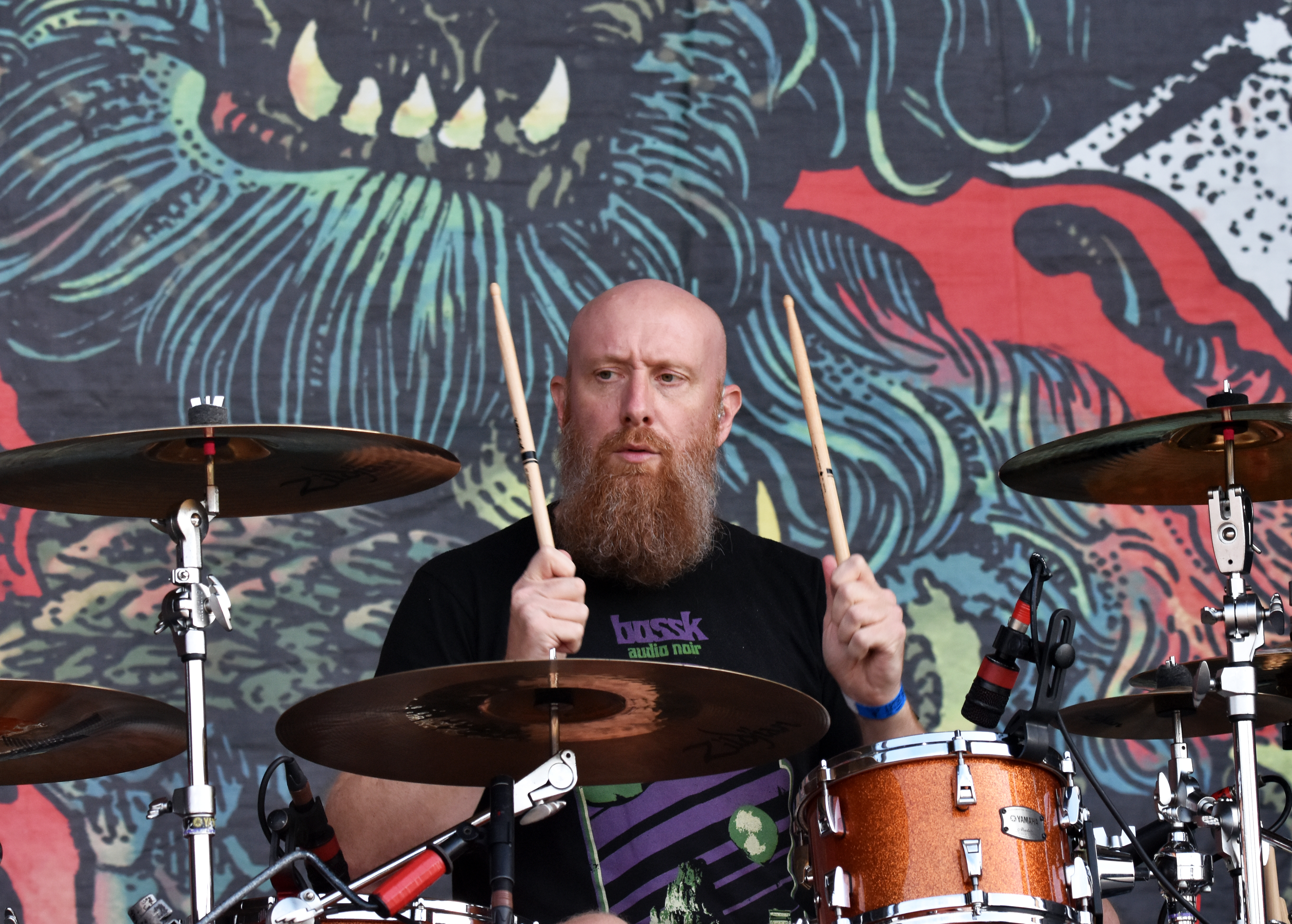
Justin Foley

Current

- Mike D'Antonio – bass (1999–present)
- Adam Dutkiewicz – lead guitar (2002–present); vocals (1999–present); drums (1999–2002)
- Joel Stroetzel – rhythm guitar (1999–2000, 2001–present), lead guitar (1999–2002), backing vocals (2002–present)
- Jesse Leach – lead vocals (1999–2002, 2010 (live), 2012–present)
- Justin Foley – drums (2003–present)

Former

- Pete Cortese – rhythm guitar (2000–2001)
- Tom Gomes – drums (2002–2003)
- Howard Jones – lead vocals (2002–2012)

Live

- Peter Wichers – lead guitar (2007)
- Patrick Lachman – lead guitar, backing vocals (2007)
- Philip Labonte – lead vocals (2010)
- Jordan Mancino – drums (2013)
- Josh Mihlek – rhythm guitar (2019)

Timeline

== Discography ==
- Killswitch Engage (2000)
- Alive or Just Breathing (2002)
- The End of Heartache (2004)
- As Daylight Dies (2006)
- Killswitch Engage (2009)
- Disarm the Descent (2013)
- Incarnate (2016)
- Atonement (2019)
- This Consequence (2025)

== Awards and nominations ==
Grammy Award

Year	Nominee / work	Award	Result	Ref.
2005	The End of Heartache	Best Metal Performance	Nominated	
2014	In Due Time	Best Metal Performance	Nominated	
2019	Unleashed	Best Metal Performance	Nominated	

Metal Hammer Golden Gods Awards

Year	Nominee / work	Award	Result	Ref.
2004	Killswitch Engage	Best International Act	Nominated	
2004	The End of Heartache	Best Album	Won	
2007	Killswitch Engage	Best International Band	Won	
2014	Killswitch Engage	Best Live Band	Won	
2016	Killswitch Engage	Best International Band	Nominated	

Boston Music Awards

Year	Nominee / work	Award	Result	Ref.
2005	Killswitch Engage	Hard Rock Band of the Year	Won	
2007	Killswitch Engage	Outstanding Metal/Hardcore Band of the Year	Won	
2007	Killswitch Engage	Act of the Year	Won	
2007	As Daylight Dies	Album of the Year (Major)	Nominated	
2007	Howard Jones	National Male Vocalist of the Year	Nominated	

Metalstorm Awards

Year	Nominee / work	Award	Result	Ref.
2009	Killswitch Engage	The Best Metalcore Album	Nominated	
2013	Disarm The Descent	The Best Hardcore / Metalcore / Deathcore	Nominated	

Bandit Rock Awards

Year	Nominee / work	Award	Result	Ref.
2009	Killswitch Engage	Best international album	Won	

Loudwire Music Awards

Year	Nominee / work	Award	Result	Ref.
2012	Jesse Leach	Rock Titan of the Year	Nominated	
2013	Disarm the Descent	Metal Album of the Year	Nominated	
2013	In Due Time	Metal Song of the Year	Nominated	
2013	Killswitch Engage	Metal Band of the Year	Nominated	
2016	Incarnate	Best Metal Album	Nominated	
2016	Killswitch Engage	Best Metal Band of the Year	Nominated	
2016	Jesse Leach	Best Vocalist of the Year	Nominated	

Decibel Hall of Fame

Year	Nominee / work	Award	Result	Ref.
2012	Alive or Just Breathing	Decibel Hall of Fame	Inducted	

Revolver Music Awards

Year	Nominee / work	Award	Result	Ref.
2016	Jesse Leach	Best Vocalist	Nominated	

Rock Sound

Year	Nominee / work	Award	Result	Ref
2012	Alive or Just Breathing	Rock Sound Hall of Fame	Inducted	

AntyRadio Rock Awards

Year	Nominee / work	Award	Result	Ref.
2018	Kill Switch Engage	Best Concert by a Foreign Star	Nominated	

NikNocturnal awards

Year	Nominee / work	Award	Result	Ref.
2025	Adam Dutkiewicz	Guitarist of the Year	Nominated	
2025	This Consequence	Album of the Year	Nominated	
