= The Signal Fire =

Single by Killswitch Engage featuring Howard Jones

from the album Atonement
- Released: August 15, 2019
- Genre: Metalcore
- Length: 3:05
- Label: Metal Blade
- Songwriters: Mike D'Antonio; Adam Dutkiewicz; Justin Foley; Jesse Leach; Joel Stroetzel
- Producer: Adam Dutkiewicz

Killswitch Engage singles chronology
"I Am Broken Too" (2019)	"The Signal Fire" (2019)	"I Can't Be The Only One" (2020)

"The Signal Fire" is a song by the American metalcore band Killswitch Engage. The song was released as the third single from the album in August 2019. The song features guest vocals from Howard Jones, who was the band's lead vocalist from 2002 to 2012.

== Background ==
The song Signal Fire seen the band collaborate with former vocalist Howard Jones. Lead singer Jesse Leach touched upon the song stating: “I had an image from Lord of The Rings when they climb to the top of the mountain and light a fire to signal for backup. It felt powerful to me. At the same time, Howard’s Light The Torch was making new music. I thought, ‘‘Light The Torch’ and ‘Signal Fire’ make sense together.’ It needed to be a call-to-arms, and I wanted to invite him to sing on it. We hit it off for the first time, recently. Afterwards, we were texting back-and-forth. We needed a song with him to show the fans there’s solidarity. It’s a perfect ode to our bond as brothers and a nice nod to Light The Torch.

== Reception ==
Several reviews noted "The Signal Fire" as being a highlight of Atonement.

Thom Jurek of AllMusic praised the "hard-grooving riffery" of the song and the performances of both Leach and Jones. J. Andrew of Metal Injection called the song the album's "most brutal moment" and called the addition of Jones on the song "an awesome fan-nerd moment, and a welcome combination of two of metal's most forceful voices." Ricky Aarons of Wall of Sound also praised Leach and Jones's performances, noting that the vocals of Jones were closer in style to what he used with Killswitch Engage compared to the style he uses in his current band Light the Torch.

Chris Annunziata of Metal Invader wrote "Overall, the song rips" however he did note that the group underutilized Jones clean singing. Thasha Brown of Distorted Sound stated "Leach and Dutkiewicz’s harmonies measure up just as well. We begin to hear the wonderful blend of hardcore and metal which make KILLSWITCH ENGAGE the metalcore heavyweights we know them as. The hardcore groove of The Signal Fire is mellifluous against calls of broken, hopeless."

Consequence named “The Signal Fire” the 14th best metal/hard rock song of 2019. In 2020 it was voted the fifth greatest metal duet of all time by readers of Revolver Magazine.

== Music video ==
The song's music video was directed by Ian McFarland.

The video shows the band performing the song in a rehearsal space, with Howard Jones sitting off to the side. During the chorus, Jones joins with the band in performing the song.

== Live performances ==
For a majority of the songs live performances Jesse Leach sings the song alone. However Howard Jones has sporadically joined the band on stage to perform the song alongside Leach. One of the more notable instances of the duo singing took place on September 21, 2024, during the bands 25th anniversary headlining set at as part of the New England Metal & Hardcore Festival in Worcester, Massachusetts.

== Personnel ==
Killswitch Engage

- Jesse Leach – co-lead vocals
- Adam Dutkiewicz – lead guitar, backing vocals
- Joel Stroetzel – rhythm guitar
- Mike D'Antonio – bass guitar
- Justin Foley – drums

Guest musicians

- Howard Jones – co-lead vocals

== Charts ==
Chart (2019)	Peak position
US Hot Rock Songs (Billboard)	19
US Rock Digital Songs (Billboard)	15
US Hard Rock Digital Songs (Billboard)	9
