= Atonement (Killswitch Engage album) =

2019 studio album by Killswitch Engage

Studio album by Killswitch Engage
- Released: August 16, 2019
- Recorded: February–April 2019
- Genre: Melodic metalcore
- Length: 39:01
- Labels: Metal Blade; Sony
- Producer: Adam Dutkiewicz

Killswitch Engage chronology
Incarnate (2016)	Atonement (2019)	This Consequence (2025)

Singles from Atonement
- 1. "Unleashed" Released: June 25, 2019; 2. " I Am Broken Too" Released: July 16, 2019; 3. "The Signal Fire" Released: August 15, 2019; 4. "I Can't Be the Only One" Released: February 22, 2020

Atonement is the eighth studio album by the American metalcore band Killswitch Engage, released on August 16, 2019 through Metal Blade Records, making it their first album since 2000 not to be released through Roadrunner Records. The lead single "Unleashed" was released on June 25, and followed by "I Am Broken Too" in July which would later follow up with a music video in August, as well as "The Signal Fire" shortly before the album's release. The band began a co-headlining tour of North America with Clutch in promotion of the album in July.

In November 2019, the track "Unleashed" was nominated for the Grammy Award for "Best Metal Performance", making it the third Grammy nomination for Killswitch Engage.

On May 1, 2020, the band released an EP entitled Atonement II: B-Sides for Charity on their Bandcamp, featuring six previously unreleased songs taken from the recording sessions of Atonement. 100% of the proceeds from the EP's sales were donated to the COVID-19 relief organization Center For Disaster Philanthropy, raising over $30,000.

== Background and recording ==
The album was recorded over a period of two years, with ideas for the album beginning in 2017. Recording sessions took place on both coasts of the United States, but they were put on hold when vocalist Jesse Leach developed scar tissue on a polyp in his throat and underwent speech and vocal therapy for three months. Following his successful recovery the band then went on a 2018 tour with Iron Maiden, on tour Leach began to experience writer’s block. By the end of tour, Adam Dutkiewicz took him aside and offered words of inspiration. Leach recalled “I shared my unfinished lyrics, and he said, ‘You don’t even need all of these. Keep it simple.’,” Leach added “I was stressed out. I was insecure. A lot was going on in my head between writer’s block and the surgery. It was amazing to have a friend and producer like Adam mentally slap me upside the face and encourage me.” Atonement was thus described as a "reflection of perseverance and passion through the trials and suffering of our existence" by the band, and by Leach as "musically the most diverse record we've done as a band".

While most of Atonement was written by the time they were touring with Iron Maiden in 2018 some of it going as far back as 2016. It was a conversation the band had London that solidified its direction. Leach recalled “I was like, ‘Let’s just crank out some heavy stuff.’ It’s what we’re good at,” Dutkiewicz added “I wanted to do that. Maybe that’s why I ended up writing all those fast songs,” The album's lyrics touch upon subjects such as social issues and mental health.

The song Signal Fire seen the band collaborate with former vocalist Howard Jones. Leach touched upon the song stating “I had an image from Lord of The Rings when they climb to the top of the mountain and light a fire to signal for backup,” “It felt powerful to me. At the same time, Howard’s Light The Torch was making new music. I thought, ‘‘Light The Torch’ and ‘Signal Fire’ make sense together.’ It needed to be a call-to-arms, and I wanted to invite him to sing on it. We hit it off for the first time, recently. Afterwards, we were texting back-and-forth. We needed a song with him to show the fans there’s solidarity. It’s a perfect ode to our bond as brothers and a nice nod to Light The Torch.” The album also features a collaboration with Chuck Billy, vocalist of the band Testament, Leach mentions Chuck Billy as one of his favorite metal singers and notes that, at the suggestion of bassist Joel Stroetzel, Billy was included on "The Crownless King" due to its similarity to Testament songs.

The album covers artwork was done by artist Richey Beckett, with the art direction and layout being done by the band’s bass player Mike D’Antonio.

== Lyrics ==
In an interview the band's lead singer Jesse Leach stated

"There's some angry, political stuff," but noted that it’s written ambiguously "because I'd rather it read like a story than a direct statement.” "There’s a lot of heavy themes lyrically – I’d even go so far as to say it’s probably the most difficult record I’ve had to write, because it comes from such a dark, angry place," some of the lyrical themes tackle mental health which leach is a big advocate of."

== Release and promotion ==
Killswitch Engage announced Atonement on June 25, 2019, and released the first single "Unleashed" the same day. The following single "I am Broken Too" was released July 16, its music video was later released on August 5. The third and final single "The Signal Fire" featuring Howard Jones was released one day prior to the album's release on August 15. The song's music video was released five days later on August 20.

Three days prior to the albums release on August 13, 2019, Killswitch Engage held a special record release show at the Space in Las Vegas, Nevada, where they played multiple songs from the album.

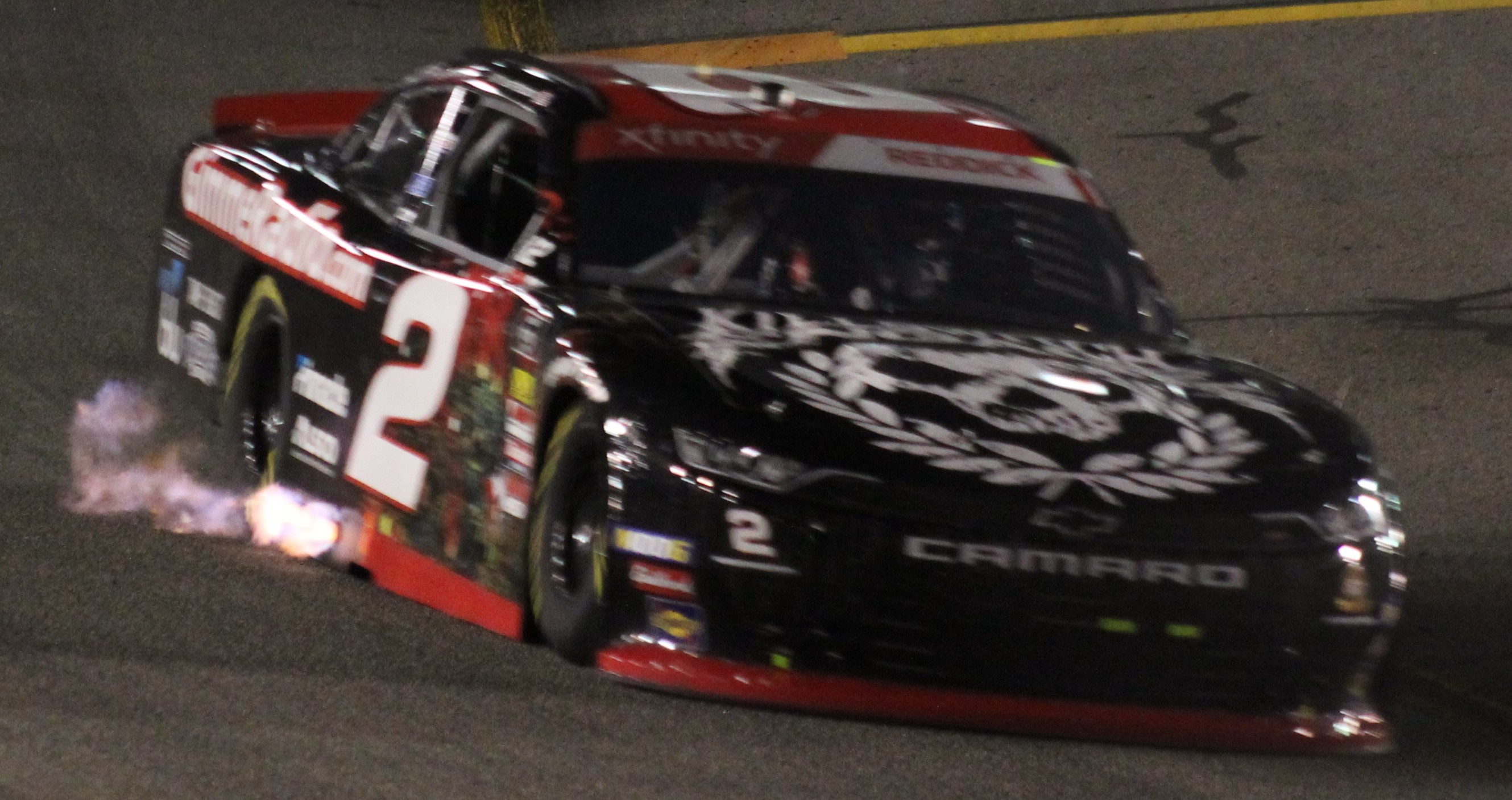
Tyler Reddick driving the Killswitch Engage sponsored car at Richmond Raceway

Atonement sold 33,000 copies in its first week and debuted at number 15 on the Billboard 200. It also peaked at No. 2 on the Top Album Sales chart, and the Top Current Albums chart, and No. 1 on the Digital Albums chart, the Top Album Sales chart, the Independent Albums chart, and both the Top Rock and Hard Rock albums chart. Internationally it peaked in the top 15 in six other countries, with the highest being number 4 in Australia.

Following the album's release Killswitch Engage partnered with Gimmie Radio to sponsor a Chevrolet Camaro at the 2019 NASCAR Xfinity Playoffs which was driven by Tyler Reddick. The car featured the band's logo on the hood and the Atonement album cover of the right side.

The band began a co-headlining tour of North America with Clutch in promotion of the album in July. However shortly after the Covid-19 pandemic halted the band's touring in support of the album as they had to cancel a Spring North American headlining tour alongside August Burns Red and Light The Torch. This tour was later rescheduled to the winter of 2022.

== Critical reception ==
Professional ratings
Aggregate scores
Source	Rating
Metacritic	78/100
Review scores
Source	Rating
AllMusic	4/5 stars
Blabbermouth.net	8/10
Consequence	A−
Exclaim!	8/10
Kerrang!	3/5
Metal.de	8/10
Metal Injection	8.5/10
MetalSucks	3.5/5 stars
Wall of Sound	7/10

The album received positive reviews from music critics. At Metacritic, which assigns a normalised rating out of 100 to reviews from mainstream critics, the album has an average score of 78 out of 100 based on five reviews, indicating "generally favourable reviews".

Wall of Sound writer Ricky Aarons wrote that Atonement "does what [the band's] other releases have, and that is, craft the build-ups and hooks to what we would expect to hear as a crunchy breakdown" but then the band "steadily bring us back down to the start", which "retains old-school metal fans but also attracts the more contemporary metalcore fans". Aarons concluded that "maybe what Killswitch Engage have done here is perfect, and therefore it could be their best album". J Andrew writing for Metal Injection wrote Atonement is a great Killswitch Engage album, though it still follows the pattern of opening with its four best songs and then hitting cruise control. That said, closer "Bite the Hand That Feeds" totally slays as well. The rest of the album isn't as immediate or effective, but that's not meant as a slight. It's clear from the personal nature of "I Am Broken Too" and "I Can't Be the Only One" that Jesse needed to make this album. Max Morin writing for Exclaim! wrote “Atonement is a monster record in an almost untouchable career.” Blabbermouth.net stated “Atonement" is unlikely to be heralded as KILLSWITCH ENGAGE's masterpiece, but it is plainly their strongest album since Leach's return and a very timely reimagining of a sound that, like it or not, has helped to define a vast amount of metal in the 21st century. These are the best songs the band have written in 15 years, and there is fire in the KILLSWITCH belly again.

AllMusic included the album on their year end list of the best metal albums of 2019.

=== Accolades ===
Publication	Country	Accolade	Year	Rank
Loudwire	US	50 best metal albums of 2019	2019	NR
Metal Hammer	UK	Top 20 metal albums of the year	2019	17
Revolver	US	Best albums of 2019	2019	19
Consequence	US	Best metal/hard rock albums of the year	2019	9

- Loudwire named “Unleashed” one of the top 66 metal songs of the year
- Revolver named “The Crownless King” the 10th best song of the year
- Consequence named “The Signal Fire” the 14th best metal/hard rock song of the year

== Track listing ==
All tracks are written by Adam Dutkiewicz, Mike D'Antonio, Joel Stroetzel, Jesse Leach, and Justin Foley.

No.	Title	Length
1.	"Unleashed"	4:35
2.	"The Signal Fire" (featuring Howard Jones)	3:05
3.	"Us Against the World"	3:19
4.	"The Crownless King" (featuring Chuck Billy)	3:10
5.	"I Am Broken Too"	2:39
6.	"As Sure as the Sun Will Rise"	2:49
7.	"Know Your Enemy"	3:51
8.	"Take Control"	3:44
9.	"Ravenous"	2:52
10.	"I Can't Be the Only One"	4:09
11.	"Bite the Hand That Feeds"	4:48
Total length:		39:01

Atonement II: B-Sides for Charity

EP by Killswitch Engage
- Released: May 1, 2020
- Recorded: February–April 2019
- Length: 24:36
- Label: Metal Blade
- Producer: Adam Dutkiewicz

Atonement II: B-Sides for Charity
No.	Title	Length
1.	"To the Great Beyond"	3:58
2.	"Hollow Convictions"	4:49
3.	"Killing of Leviathan"	2:55
4.	"No Devotion"	4:22
5.	"I Feel Alive Again"	3:39
6.	"Prophets of Treason"	4:53
Total length:		24:38

== Personnel ==
Credits adapted from album's liner notes.

Killswitch Engage

- Jesse Leach – lead vocals
- Adam Dutkiewicz – lead guitar, backing vocals
- Joel Stroetzel – rhythm guitar, backing vocals
- Mike D'Antonio – bass
- Justin Foley – drums

Guest musicians

- Chuck Billy – additional vocals on "The Crownless King"
- Howard Jones – additional vocals on "The Signal Fire"

Production

- Adam Dutkiewicz – production, engineering
- Daniel Castleman – assistant engineering
- Andy Sneap – mixing, mastering
- Mike D'Antonio – art direction and layout
- Richey Beckett – cover illustration
- Travis Shinn – group photos

== Charts ==
Chart (2019)	Peak position
Australian Albums (ARIA)	4
Austrian Albums (Ö3 Austria)	16
Belgian Albums (Ultratop Flanders)	23
Belgian Albums (Ultratop Wallonia)	70
Canadian Albums (Billboard)	17
Finnish Albums (Suomen virallinen lista)	12
French Albums (SNEP)	161
German Albums (Offizielle Top 100)	11
Japan Hot Albums (Billboard Japan)	93
Japanese Albums (Oricon)	60
Scottish Albums (OCC)	7
Spanish Albums (PROMUSICAE)	55
Swiss Albums (Schweizer Hitparade)	9
UK Albums (OCC)	13
UK Albums Sales Chart (OCC)	7
UK Album Downloads (OCC)	9
UK Vinyl Chart (OCC)	12
UK Rock & Metal Chart (OCC)	2
US Billboard 200 (Billboard)	13
US Top Hard Rock Albums (Billboard)	1
US Top Rock Albums (Billboard)	1
US Top Rock & Alternative Albums (Billboard)	2
US Independent Albums (Billboard)	1
US Indie Store Album Sales (Billboard)	1
