= This Consequence =

2025 studio album by Killswitch Engage

Studio album by Killswitch Engage
- Released: February 21, 2025
- Recorded: 2023–2024
- Studios: Signature Sound (San Diego); Mainline (Westfield); Wicked Good (San Diego)
- Genre: Melodic metalcore
- Length: 35:02
- Label: Metal Blade
- Producer: Adam Dutkiewicz

Killswitch Engage chronology
| Atonement (2019) | This Consequence (2025) |

Singles from This Consequence
- 1. "Forever Aligned" Released: November 20, 2024; 2. "I Believe" Released: January 23, 2025; 3. "Collusion" Released: February 24, 2025; 4. "Aftermath" Released: June 18, 2025

This Consequence is the ninth studio album by American metalcore band Killswitch Engage, released through Metal Blade Records on February 21, 2025. Its release followed nearly six years after their previous album, Atonement—the longest gap between studio albums in the band's career.

== Background ==
In March 2024, the band's rhythm guitarist Joel Stroetzel stated, "We just finished all the final bits of tracking over the last couple of weeks. So the guitars are done, all the vocals are now done. Everything's there." On November 5, the band revealed the artwork for the album and shared "11/20/24. New music coming. Mark your calendars" on social media. Vocalist Jesse Leach commented on the album stating that "It had to be next level. It had to be different enough for people to really recognize we're putting forth an effort-or what's the point of doing this? There was no repeating ourselves. It was very carefully planned out and passionately written. It sounds like KILLSWITCH, yet there's also a fresh spirit to it."

In an interview with Kerrang!, the band revealed that this was their first album since Alive or Just Breathing in which they all worked together in the same room. Lead guitarist Adam Dutkiewicz stated, "While there are still songs written by one band member, we all got to play them together, so if something didn't feel right for anyone, they could rewrite bits themselves."

In an interview with Revolver Leach stated

"This Consequence refers to the existential crisis humanity is in due to our conflict, divisions, war, deception, hatred and dire lack of compassion," Leach explains. "It's cause and effect. Every action has a reaction. It's the nature of physics. In short, the title is a loose metaphor for a reckoning or a judgement day for us as a species."

== Writing ==
Following the COVID-19 pandemic lead singer Jesse Leach had some trouble getting back into the swing of things after not being able to work on new music. He wanted to get back his "punk-rock, piss-and-vinegar spirit" to write the record. However, Leach's initial attempts produced lyrics that sounded unoriginal to his bandmates.

"Jesse was reusing a lot of old ideas and topics and themes," Dutkiewicz said. "He was very responsive about it, and he took all the criticism the best he could have. And it's great that we have a singer that's willing to start from scratch and take an idea and throw it away."

Leach's lyrical break came once he started doing something he usually doesn't—writing from outside of his own perspective. "Some of these songs are not about me at all. Some of them started out as me observing a situation or listening to somebody talk about what they went through, and just sort of journaling it."

In another interview with Blabbermouth, Leach stated, "I had to sort of turn my attention to what we've all been through — from COVID, the whole pandemic till now, the divisiveness, people at each other's throats, being divided, sort of political ideologies, religious warfare. Everywhere you look, there's something to be harped upon that is negative and dark, and I think it's important to acknowledge that but not to get lost in it, not to allow it to swallow you to despair."

== Artwork ==
Upon the reveal of the albums cover art many fans online began to criticize the band on allegations that the album cover was made with Artificial Intelligence. However bass player Mike D‘Antonio was quick to dismiss the claim stating "I killed myself making that fricking cover art, so don’t tell me I just typed some words into a computer and it popped out, ’cause that’s… eight months later, that’s not what happened. It took ten thousand photos and a lot of time. So, I just wanted to put that out there."

== Release and promotion ==
The first single from the album, "Forever Aligned", was released on November 20. Vocalist Leach commented on the song, stating that it is "one of those songs that is not just about us as humans, our love, and connection, but that connection to the unknown, the greater power, the universe, or God". "I Believe", the second single from the album, was released on January 23, 2025. "I Believe" became the band's first ever song to reach the top 10 on the US Mainstream Rock chart peaking at number 4. Music videos were made for both singles, an additional video for "Collusion" was released alongside the album, and one for "Aftermath" was released on July 17, 2025. Upon its release the album was among the top ten most streamed albums on Spotify.

The band went on a North American tour in May 2025 to support the album, which was their first North American tour since 2022. The tour featured supporting bands Shadows Fall, Fit for a King, Boundaries, Kublai Khan TX, and Frozen Soul. They also held a European headlining tour from late September to December, with Hatebreed, Fit For An Autopsy and Decapitated serevring as the supporting bands. Touring for the album continued into 2026, with a US Summer tour with Machine Head, Iron Reagan, and Havok, while also headlining the Milwaukee Metal Fest. The tour will continue into Canada in August alongside Machine Head and Malevolence, and the US alongside Machine Head, Rivers of Nihil, Judiciary in September. The band is also confirmed to be on the roster for the Louder Than Life festival taking place in Louisville in September. During the Fall they will also be headlining an Australian tour.

== Reception ==
Professional ratings
Review scores
| Source | Rating |
|---|---|
| AllMusic | 3.5/5 stars |
| Angry Metal Guy | 3/5 |
| The Aquarian Weekly | Positive |
| Blabbermouth | 9/10 |
| Kerrang! | 3/5 |
| Metal.de | 10/10 |
| Metal Master Kingdom | 5.5/10 stars |
| MetalSucks | 4/5 |
| New Noise Magazine | 4.5/5 stars |
| The Rock Father Magazine | 10/10 |

This Consequence was generally well received by critics upon release. Max Heilman of MetalSucks gave it a score of 4/5 and wrote, "While it's not about to reinvent the wheel, and might stand in the shadow of yesteryear's Headbangers Ball staples, this is a fantastic encapsulation of what made this wave of metalcore so special."

Writing for Kerrang!, James Hickie stated, "Killswitch Engage are impressively angry and anthemic – but inconsistent – on ninth album This Consequence." He awarded the album a score of 3/5. Angry Metal Guy gave it a score of 3.0/5, writing that "the writing is a little too safe at times, and a rather bland production and crushed mastering do no favors" but that "flaws aside, This Consequence marks a solid, if unremarkable addition to the Killswitch Engage catalog". Blabbermouth writer Dom Lawson gave it a score of 9/10 and stated, "The greatest bands stay great. This Consequence is a triumph." New Noise Magazine wrote "As always, the musicianship is impeccable and shows what 25 years of playing together will produce. Leach doesn't disappoint with the combination of vocal flexibility. His lyrics on this record maintain the usual emotional balance that can either make you want to cry or stand up and fight." TiVo of AllMusic wrote that "the album delivers another potent dose of their trademark sound mixing brutal, chugging riffs with soaring, melodic choruses."

Diana Heinbucher from Metal.de gave the album a 10/10 stating, "Anyone seeking an intense, emotionally charged work—one brimming with power and honesty—will find exactly what they are looking for here. A massive, dark, and musically impressive work that showcases Killswitch Engage at their very best." Amanda Ferrante Batista of The Aquarian Weekly also gave the album praise writing "Killswitch Engage wrote the book on melodic metal, and this pensively-written and carefully-crafted masterpiece clutches another notch in the belt for one of the genre’s greatest acts."

Loudwire included This Consequence in their list of the top 51 rock and metal albums of 2025.

== Track listing ==
All tracks are written by Adam Dutkiewicz, Mike D'Antonio, Joel Stroetzel, Jesse Leach, and Justin Foley.

| No. | Title | Length |
|---|---|---|
| 1. | "Abandon Us" | 3:38 |
| 2. | "Discordant Nation" | 2:40 |
| 3. | "Aftermath" | 3:38 |
| 4. | "Forever Aligned" | 4:05 |
| 5. | "I Believe" | 3:54 |
| 6. | "Where It Dies" | 3:27 |
| 7. | "Collusion" | 3:22 |
| 8. | "The Fall of Us" | 4:19 |
| 9. | "Broken Glass" | 2:30 |
| 10. | "Requiem" | 3:29 |
| Total length: | | 35:02 |

== Personnel ==
Credits adapted from the album's liner notes and Tidal.

=== Killswitch Engage ===
- Jesse Leach – vocals
- Adam Dutkiewicz – lead guitar, vocals
- Joel Stroetzel – rhythm guitar
- Mike D'Antonio – bass
- Justin Foley – drums

=== Additional contributors ===
- Adam Dutkiewicz – production, engineering
- Mark Lewis – mixing
- Evan Sammons – mixing assistance, editing
- Ted Jensen – mastering
- Mike D'Antonio – art direction, photography, layout
- Tomas Barcelo – robot corpse sculptor
- Travis Shinn – group photos
- Jeremy Saffer – art photography

== Charts ==
| Chart (2019) | Peak position |
|---|---|
| Austrian Albums (Ö3 Austria) | 13 |
| Belgian Albums (Ultratop Flanders) | 159 |
| Belgian Albums (Ultratop Wallonia) | 82 |
| German Albums (Offizielle Top 100) | 13 |
| Japanese Albums (Oricon) | 45 |
| Scottish Albums (OCC) | 9 |
| Swiss Albums (Schweizer Hitparade) | 24 |
| UK Albums (OCC) | 85 |
| UK Albums Sales Chart (OCC) | 5 |
| UK Album Downloads (OCC) | 3 |
| UK Vinyl Chart (OCC) | 14 |
| UK Rock & Metal Albums (OCC) | 1 |
| UK Independent Albums (OCC) | 2 |
| US Billboard 200 (Billboard) | 188 |
| US Top Hard Rock Albums (Billboard) | 11 |
| US Top Rock Albums (Billboard) | 11 |
| US Top Rock & Alternative Albums (Billboard) | 41 |
| US Independent Albums (Billboard) | 11 |
| US Indie Store Album Sales (Billboard) | 11 |
