= Justin Foley =

American drummer

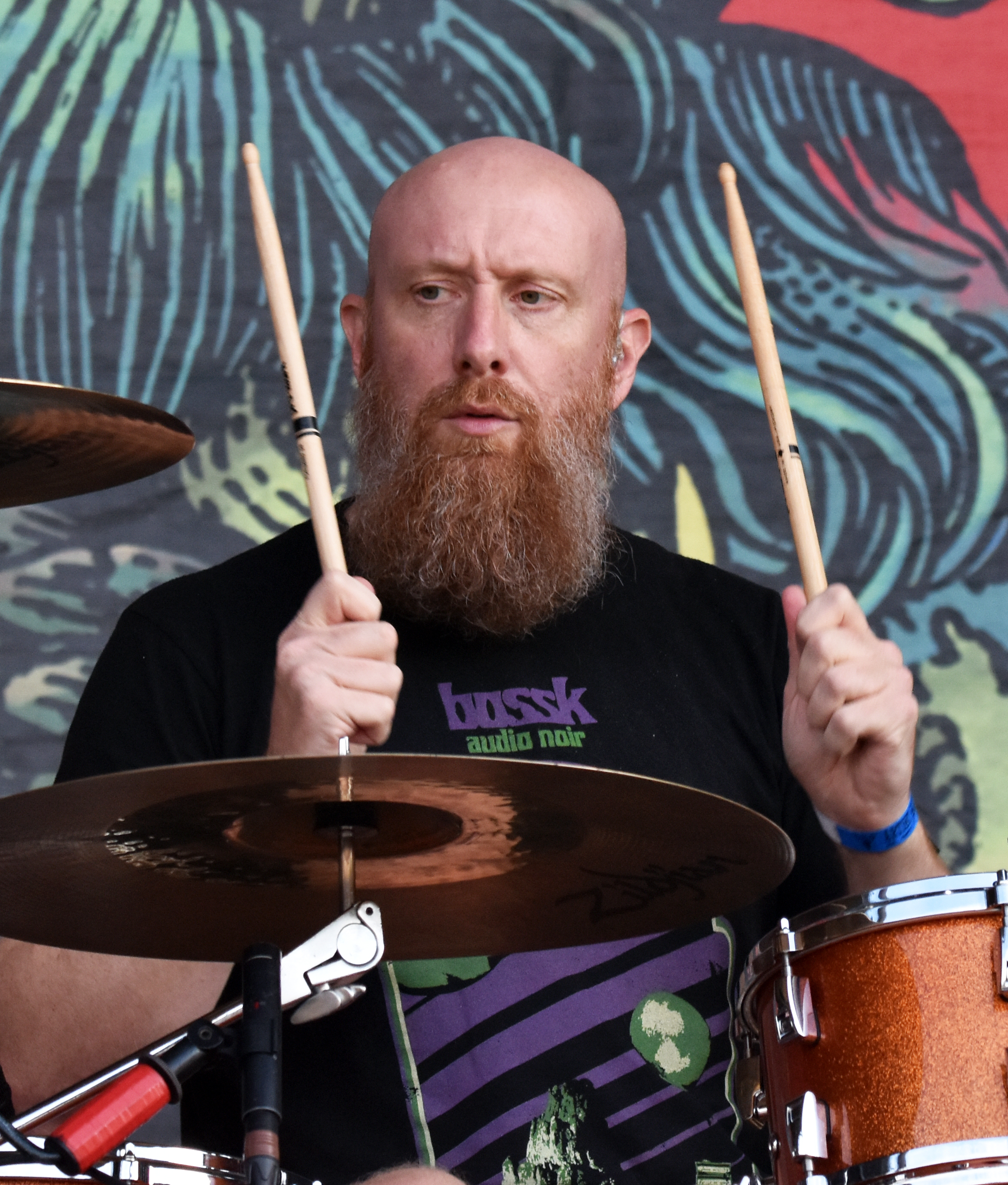
- Foley with Killswitch Engage in 2023

Background information
- Also known as: JayFo
- Born: Justin Foley; June 16, 1976 (age 50); Simsbury, Connecticut, U.S.
- Genres: Metalcore; thrash metal
- Occupation: Drummer
- Member of: Killswitch Engage; Lybica
- Formerly of: Red Tide; Blood Has Been Shed
- Website: killswitchengage.com

Justin Foley is an American musician best known as the drummer of the metalcore band Killswitch Engage. He is also a former member of the band Blood Has Been Shed along with Killswitch Engage's former lead singer, Howard Jones.

== Early life ==
Foley is a classically trained percussionist who attended the University of Connecticut for his bachelor's degree and the University of Hartford's Hartt School for his master's degree.

Foley has cited Charlie Benante and "obscure" Russian classical composer as some of his influences.

== Career ==
Before joining Killswitch Engage, Foley participated in a Connecticut band called Red Tide. Red Tide began as a thrash metal outfit in 1993 then evolved into a jazz metal band in the late 1990s. As the primary lyricist and one of the songwriters for Red Tide, Foley earned local celebrityhood. With Red Tide, Foley released at least five demo tapes and two CDs. Red Tide disbanded in 2002 as there was a general lack of interest in continuing.

In 2001 Foley joined Blood Has Been Shed, he recorded one album with the band Spirals which was released in 2003. He remained a member until the band’s disbandment in 2005.

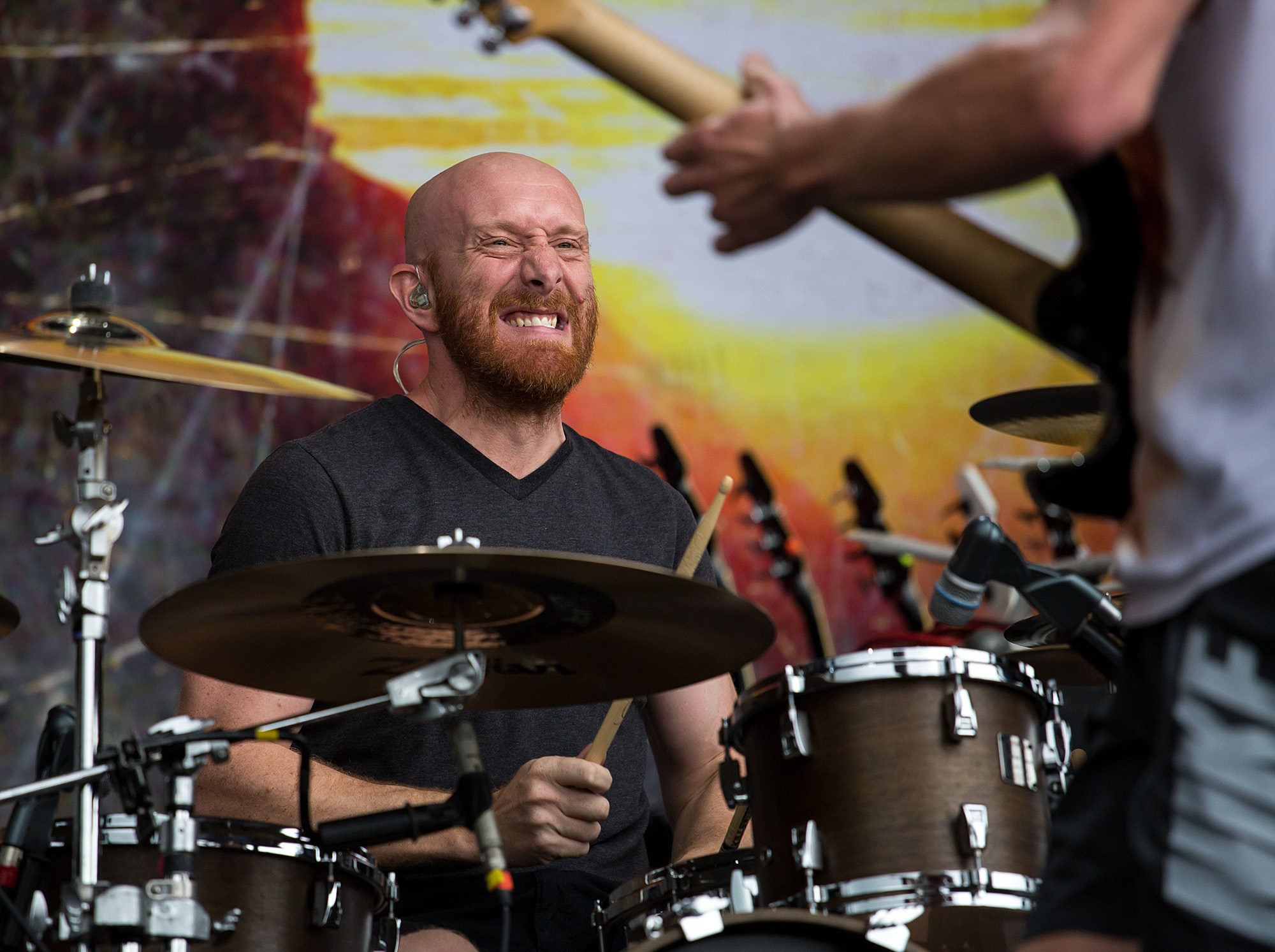
Foley performing with Killswitch Engage in 2014

Foley joined Killswitch Engage alongside fellow Blood Has Been Shed bandmate Howard Jones after the departure of the previous drummer, Tom Gomes, in October 2003. He joined the band just as they were hitting their height of popularity as his first two appearances came on The End of Heartache (2004) and As Daylight Dies (2007). The group have been considered one of the more influential bands in the Metalcore genre and Foley has played on 7 total albums, along with being nominated for 3 Grammy Awards for Best Metal Performance.

When he is not touring Foley has been known to serve as a freelance orchestral musician with many Connecticut symphony orchestras such as the Waterbury Symphony and New Britain Symphony. citing the marimba as his favorite orchestral instrument.

In 2009 Foley filled in on four shows during As I Lay Dying’s South American tour when their drummer Jordan Mancino had to sit out due to health problems.

Foley is one of the many advertising artists for Evans Drumheads, Yamaha Drums, and Zildjian Cymbals.

Foley also plays drums on metalcore band Unearth's 2011 album Darkness in the Light, filling in for departed drummer Derek Kerswill. He also toured with the band in support of the album.

Foley started Lybica, a four-piece instrumental post-rock/metal band, in 2020. His primary role is guitarist, but he played both guitar and drums on their self-titled album, which was released on September 16, 2022. Lybica is signed with Metal Blade Records.

== Gear ==
Foley favors a smaller drum after playing a bigger kit earlier in his career. He uses a "20" kick and 10", 13", and 15" toms. Instead of using two drums for double-kick, he uses one drum with a double pedal. Much of his gear consist of Yamaha products who he is sponsored by.

== Personal life ==
Foley has been quoted as saying that if he did not play drums, he would like to try out for the New York Yankees, of whom he is a fan. He is also a Simpsons fanatic. Foley is known for his love of cats, a major inspiration for the band Lybica, where Foley plays guitar. He is married to his wife Leigh.

== Discography ==
=== Red Tide ===
- Themes of the Cosmic Consciousness (1997)
- Type II (2001)

=== Blood Has Been Shed ===
- Spirals (2003; Ferret Records)

=== Killswitch Engage ===
- The End of Heartache (2004; Roadrunner Records)
- As Daylight Dies (2006; Roadrunner Records)
- Killswitch Engage (2009; Roadrunner Records)
- Disarm The Descent (2013; Roadrunner Records)
- Incarnate (2016; Roadrunner Records)
- Atonement (2019; Metal Blade Records)
- This Consequence (2025; Metal Blade Records)

=== Lybica, drums and guitar ===
- Lybica (2022; Metal Blade Records)

=== As a guest ===
- Unearth – Darkness in the Light (2011; Metal Blade Records)
