= Seeking the Way: The Greatest Hits =

Greatest hits album by Shadows Fall
- Released: October 23, 2007
- Recorded: 1999–2004
- Genre: Heavy metal, thrash metal
- Length: 62:26
- Label: Century Media
- Producer: Alan Douches (Mastering)

Shadows Fall chronology
Threads of Life (2007)	Seeking the Way: The Greatest Hits (2007)	Retribution (2009)

Professional ratings
Review scores
Source	Rating
Allmusic	3.5/5 stars

Seeking the Way: The Greatest Hits is a Shadows Fall greatest hits collection, covering songs the band released through their previous label Century Media. The songs are taken from the following releases:

- Second LP Of One Blood (2000)
- Japanese EP Deadworld (2001)
- Third LP The Art of Balance (2002)
- Fourth LP The War Within (2004)
- Compilation Fallout from the War (2006)

The first three songs are taken from the band's 2000 release Of One Blood. They have been completely remixed and remastered. The next two tracks (4 and 5) are taken from the band's 2001 Japanese EP Deadworld (despite both songs appearing on later releases). These two tracks have also been remixed and remastered.

Album title is taken from the lyric of the song, "Thoughts Without Words".

== Track listing ==
All lyrics are written by Brian Fair, except "Fleshold", written by Matthew Bachand and David Germain; all music is composed by Shadows Fall.

No.	Title	Original album	Length
1.	"Crushing Belial"	Of One Blood	5:26
2.	"Of One Blood"	Of One Blood	4:46
3.	"Fleshold"	Of One Blood	3:38
4.	"Deadworld"	Deadworld (EP)	4:47
5.	"Stepping Outside the Circle"	Deadworld (EP)	5:15
6.	"Thoughts Without Words"	The Art of Balance	4:33
7.	"Destroyer of Senses"	The Art of Balance	2:55
8.	"The Idiot Box"	The Art of Balance	4:31
9.	"The Light That Blinds"	The War Within	4:58
10.	"Enlightened by the Cold"	The War Within	3:04
11.	"What Drives the Weak"	The War Within	4:45
12.	"Inspiration on Demand"	The War Within	3:54
13.	"The Power of I and I"	The War Within	3:36
14.	"In Effigy"	Fallout from the War	3:25
15.	"Seize the Calm"	Fallout from the War	2:53

== Personnel ==
- Brian Fair – vocals
- Jonathan Donais – lead guitar, vocals
- Matt Bachand – rhythm guitar, vocals
- Paul Romanko – bass
- David Germain – drums (tracks 1–3)
- Derek Kerswill – drums (tracks 4–5)
- Jason Bittner – drums (tracks 6–14)
