= Madness in Manila: Shadows Fall Live in the Philippines 2009 =

Madness in Manila

Video by Shadows Fall
- Released: October 26, 2010
- Recorded: April 30, 2009
- Venues: Pulp Summer Slam in Manila, Philippines
- Genres: Thrash metal; heavy metal; metalcore
- Length: 68:26
- Labels: Everblack Industries; Ferret
- Producer: Will Putney

Shadows Fall chronology
The Art of Touring (2005)	Madness in Manila (2010)

Professional ratings
Review scores
Source	Rating
AllMusic	4/5 stars

Madness in Manila: Shadows Fall Live in the Philippines 2009, commonly referred to as simply Madness in Manila, is the second concert DVD by American thrash metal band Shadows Fall and was released on October 26, 2010 via Everblack Industries/Ferret Music. The disc included footage that was shot on April 30, 2009 at the Pulp Summer Slam in Manila, Philippines.

The performance features songs from every studio album the band had released at that point, except for the debut Somber Eyes to the Sky.

== Track listing ==
All lyrics are written by Brian Fair; all music is composed by Shadows Fall.

No.	Title	Length
1.	"The Light That Blinds"	4:53
2.	"Forevermore"	5:16
3.	"Failure of the Devout"	5:59
4.	"Crushing Belial"	5:57
5.	"Burning the Lives"	3:59
6.	"A Public Execution"	6:45
7.	"Casting Shade" (Instrumental)	0:52
8.	"Destroyer of Senses"	3:00
9.	"What Drives the Weak"	4:25
10.	"The Power of I and I"	4:10
11.	"Enlightened by the Cold"	2:53
12.	"Thoughts Without Words"	5:18
13.	"Inspiration on Demand"	3:32
14.	"War" (uses lyrics from "War" by Bob Marley & the Wailers)	4:42
15.	"The Great Collapse" (Instrumental)	0:50
16.	"Redemption"	5:55

== Personnel ==
- Brian Fair - lead vocals
- Jonathan Donais - lead guitar, backing vocals
- Matt Bachand - rhythm guitar, clean vocals
- Paul Romanko - bass
- Jason Bittner - drums
