= The Art of Touring =

Video by Shadows Fall
- Released: 2005
- Recorded: 2002 – 2004 throughout the United States, Europe, and Japan
- Genres: Melodic death metal, metalcore, thrash metal
- Length: 114 min.
- Label: Century Media

The Art of Touring is the first DVD released by the American, metal band Shadows Fall. It was released in 2005 through Century Media Records. The DVD features live concert, backstage, and behind-the-scenes footage shot throughout the United States, Europe, and Japan from 2002 to 2004. The DVD also includes the six music videos from The Art of Balance and The War Within albums.

== Scene selection ==
=== Main Feature ===
1. Introduction
2. Tell us how you really feel
3. "Thoughts Without Words" (live)
4. "Destroyer of Senses" (live)
5. "The Idiot Box" (live)
6. "Of One Blood" (live)
7. "The First Noble Truth" (live)
8. "Stepping Outside the Circle" (live)
9. "A Fire in Babylon" (live)
10. "Fleshold" (live)
11. Walk: A tribute to Dimebag Darrell (live, featuring Damageplan)

=== Shenanigans ===
12. Destruction on the road!

Music Videos

13. "Thoughts Without Words"
14. "Destroyer of Senses"
15. "The Idiot Box"
16. "The Power of I and I"
17. "What Drives the Weak"
18. "Inspiration on Demand"

Bonus Feature

19. "Live Wire" (Mötley Crüe cover, live)
20. "Teasn' Pleasn'" (Dangerous Toys cover, live, featuring Jason McMaster)

== Credits ==
Musicians

- Brian Fair – lead vocals
- Jonathan Donais – lead guitar, backing vocals
- Matthew Bachand – rhythm guitar, clean vocals
- Paul Romanko – bass
- Jason Bittner – drums

DVD production

- Executive production by Matt Bachand and Jason Bittner
- Videography, editing, and co-production by Zach Merck and Joe Natale
- Authoring and co-production by Video Transfer and Colleen Hackenson
- Footage shot by Matt Bachand, Jason Bittner, Dumbboy, Matt Earl (Reign of Fury), El Duce, Willie Gee, Steve Joh, Zack Merck, Joe Natale, Ponyboy, and Trent Weller

Other credits

- Art direction, design and layout by Tom Bejgrowicz
- Front cover and booklet live photography by Will Hawkins II
- Back cover photography by Reverend Dave Ciancio, Will Hawkins II and more
- "Destroyer of False Metal" and "SF" graphics by Don Naylor for Endicott/EVR
