= Another Hero Lost =

Single by Shadows Fall

from the album Threads of Life
- Released: October 2007
- Recorded: 2007
- Genre: Heavy metal
- Length: 4:04
- Label: Atlantic
- Songwriters: Matt Bachand, Jason Bittner, Jonathan Donais, Brian Fair, Paul Romanko
- Producer: Nick Raskulinecz

Shadows Fall singles chronology
"Redemption" (2007)	"Another Hero Lost" (2007)	"Forevermore" (2008)

"Another Hero Lost" is the second single from the album Threads of Life by the thrash metal band Shadows Fall. Unlike most other Shadows Fall songs, it is a soft ballad. It was written about singer Brian Fair's cousin, who died in the U.S. war in Iraq. During concerts the band dedicates the song to soldiers fighting, and ones who have died in Iraq. The song reached #40 on the Mainstream Rock Chart. On November 17, the video debuted on MTV's Headbangers Ball and MTV2.

== Track listing ==
No.	Title	Length
1.	"Another Hero Lost" (edit)	3:54
2.	"Another Hero Lost" (album version)	4:04
3.	"Another Hero Lost" (acoustic)	4:06

== Chart performance ==
The song peaked at 40 in the Hot Mainstream Rock Tracks chart.
