= The Light That Blinds =

Song by Shadows Fall

from the album The War Within
- Released: September 21, 2004
- Recorded: April – May 2004
- Genre: Metalcore, thrash metal
- Length: 4:58
- Label: Century Media
- Songwriter(s): Matt Bachand, Jason Bittner, Jonathan Donais, Brian Fair, Paul Romanko

"The Light That Blinds" is the first track from heavy metal band Shadows Fall's fourth studio album The War Within.

This song is featured in the video game Guitar Hero II.

== Song meaning ==
Brian Fair has stated that, "This song is about how people, TV, and other influences can convince you to be something you are not, and you stay that way because you think it makes you better or more popular, but inside you do not really feel that way and it disguises your true identity."

== Personnel ==
- Brian Fair – vocals
- Jonathan Donais – lead guitar
- Matt Bachand – rhythm guitar
- Paul Romanko – bass
- Jason Bittner – drums
