= Of One Blood (album) =

2000 studio album by Shadows Fall

Studio album by Shadows Fall
- Released: April 4, 2000
- Recorded: 1999
- Studio: Planet Z Studios in Hadley, Massachusetts
- Genres: Melodic metalcore; melodic death metal
- Length: 46:02
- Label: Century Media
- Producer: Chris "Zeuss" Harris

Shadows Fall chronology
Somber Eyes to the Sky (1997)	Of One Blood (2000)	Deadworld (2001)

Of One Blood is the second studio album by American metal band Shadows Fall, released on April 4, 2000. It was the band's first release on Century Media Records, featuring Brian Fair, and the last to feature drummer David Germain.

A remastered version of the album, along with the band's 2001 Japanese EP Deadworld, was released under the title Fear Will Drag You Down in Europe and Australia, containing new and updated artwork. Metal Temple gave that version of the album a score of 7 out of 10.

== Track listing ==
No.	Title	Note	Length
1.	"Pain Glass Vision"	Instrumental	0:48
2.	"Crushing Belial"		5:26
3.	"Of One Blood"		4:46
4.	"The First Noble Truth"		4:15
5.	"Fleshold"	from Mourning a Dead World, and Somber Eyes to the Sky	3:38
6.	"Root Bound Apollo"	Overcast song (Brian Fair's former band), but not released on any recording made by Overcast until Reborn to Kill Again	6:20
7.	"Revel in My Loss"	from Somber Eyes to the Sky	5:27
8.	"Montauk"		4:23
9.	"To Ashes"	from Somber Eyes to the Sky	6:01
10.	"Serenity"		4:58
Total length:			46:02

== Personnel ==
=== Shadows Fall ===
- Brian Fair – lead vocals
- Jon Donais – lead guitar, backing vocals
- Matt Bachand – rhythm guitar, clean vocals
- Paul Romanko – bass
- David Germain – drums

=== Other personnel ===
Lyricists

- Matt Bachand – lyrics on (4, 5, 7, & 9)
- Brian Fair – lyrics on (2–4, 6, 8, & 10)
- Damien McPherson – on "Fleshold"
- Phil Labonte – on "Revel in My Loss", & "To Ashes"

2008 reissue

- Zeuss – music on "Pain Glass Vision" Remix
- Remastered by Alan Douches
- Reissue coordinating by Steve Joh
- Photography by Jason Hellmann, Alex Solca, and Morgan Walker

Additional performer

- Ray Michaud – keyboards, music on "Pain Glass Vision"

Production

- Produced, engineered, and mixed by Zeuss
- Mastered by Keith Chirgwin and Morgan Walker
- Art direction, design, and layout by Tom Bejgrowicz
- A&R – Tom Bejgrowicz
- Photography by Jason Hellmann

== Fear Will Drag You Down ==
Fear Will Drag You Down

Compilation album by Shadows Fall
- Released: January 28, 2002
- Genres: Melodic death metal, melodic metalcore
- Length: 72:30
- Label: Century Media
- Producer: Chris "Zeuss" Harris

Shadows Fall chronology
Deadworld (2001)	Fear Will Drag You Down (2002)	The Art of Balance (2002)

Professional ratings
Review scores
Source	Rating
Metal Temple	7/10

Fear Will Drag You Down is a compilation album consisting of remastered versions from Of One Blood and their 2001 Japanese EP Deadworld. It was released in Europe and Australia. Album title is taken from the lyric of the song, "Stepping Outside the Circle".

=== Track listing ===
No.	Title	Length
1.	"Deadworld"	4:47
2.	"Stepping Outside the Circle"	5:14
3.	"Crushing Belial"	5:25
4.	"Of One Blood"	4:46
5.	"The First Noble Truth"	4:14
6.	"Fleshold"	3:38
7.	"Root Bound Apollo"	6:19
8.	"Revel in My Loss"	5:27
9.	"Montauk"	4:23
10.	"To Ashes"	6:00
11.	"Serenity"	4:56
12.	"Pain Glass Vision"	0:49
13.	"Crushing Belial" (live)	5:26
14.	"The First Noble Truth" (live)	4:13
15.	"Fleshold" (live)	3:47

- Tracks 13 and 14 were recorded live at 88.9 WERS studio on April 16, 2000, in Boston, Massachusetts
- Track 15 was recorded live at CBGB on November 26, 2000, in New York City

=== Personnel ===
Shadows Fall

- Brian Fair – vocals
- Jonathan Donais – lead guitar, backing vocals
- Matt Bachand – guitar, backing vocals
- Paul Romanko – bass
- Derek Kerswill – drums (tracks 1–2)

Additional musicians

- David Germain – drums (tracks 3–15)
