= Fallout from the War =

Compilation album by Shadows Fall
- Released: June 13, 2006
- Recorded: 2006
- Studios: Planet Z Studios in Hadley, Massachusetts
- Genres: Metalcore, thrash metal, death metal
- Length: 41:47
- Label: Century Media
- Producers: Chris "Zeuss" Harris, Shadows Fall

Shadows Fall chronology
The War Within (2004)	Fallout from the War (2006)	Threads of Life (2007)

Professional ratings
Review scores
Source	Rating
About.com	4/5 stars
AllMusic	3.5/5 stars
Alternative Press	4/5 stars
Blabbermouth.net	7.5/10 stars
Scream Magazine	4/6

Fallout from the War is a compilation album by heavy metal band Shadows Fall, released on June 13, 2006. It contains a selection of songs written during the sessions for The War Within and The Art of Balance, as well as some covers by bands that have inspired Shadows Fall over the years. Fallout from the War is billed as a "companion" to The War Within.

== Background ==
Fallout from the War is meant to be a companion piece to the band's previous release, The War Within. It contains six original songs that were written during the sessions for The War Within. It also contains two re-recorded tracks that had previously only been available as bonus tracks in Japan and Europe.

- "Deadworld," a track that originally appeared on the Mourning A Dead World" (Demo), and "Deadworld EP, only released in Japan, and Fear Will Drag You Down (Europe and Australia). The version on this album is the first to feature Bittner on drums.
- "This Is My Own," a track originally from The Art of Balance sessions. The version on this album contains some new vocal harmonies.

The album contains three covers from bands that were large influences to Shadows Fall. In reference to the Only Living Witness cover, Fair says the band "was an amazing and highly underrated rock band from the Boston area." The Boston Phoenix adds that Shadows Fall, and Killswitch Engage, credit the band with "having sparked Massachusetts' now-burgeoning metalcore economy." In reference to the Leeway cover, Fair states, "Leeway was the ultimate metal/hardcore crossover band with sick thrash riffs and hard-as-nails lyrics." The last cover track, "Teasn', Pleasn'" by Dangerous Toys, originally appeared as a bonus track on the Japanese edition of The War Within, and was also re-recorded for this release.

== Reception ==
Fallout from the War received mixed to positive reviews. According to Alternative Press, "Fair's vocals are as melodic as the lashing post-thrash-metal riffs that back him." On a more general note, David Jeffries of AllMusic calls the album an "exciting and pleasingly loose collection of leftovers from the last album." However, he also notes the causal flow of the album, stating that it seems like an odds-and-ends release. Keith Bergman of Blabbermouth compliments the band stating, "Shadows Fall are getting more melodic and accessible, yes, but that they're doing it in an organic fashion — there's still a lot of thrash oozing out of the pores of these metalheads, and their organic, old-school-informed take on metalcore has so far managed to avoid most of that cloying buzzword's limitations."

== Track listing ==
All lyrics are written by Brian Fair, except where noted; all music is composed by Shadows Fall, except where noted.

No.	Title	Writer(s)	Length
1.	"In Effigy"		3:24
2.	"Will to Rebuild"		3:06
3.	"Haunting Me Endlessly"		3:43
4.	"Seize the Calm"		2:54
5.	"Carpal Tunnel"		3:53
6.	"Going, Going, Gone"		3:08
7.	"Deadworld" (re-recorded version)	Damien McPherson, Jonathan Donais, Matt Bachand, Paul Romanko, David Germain	4:52
8.	"This Is My Own" (The Art of Balance b-side)		4:47
9.	"December" (Only Living Witness cover)	Jonah Jenkins, Kevin Stevenson, Craig Silverman, Roy Costa, Eric Stevenson	5:07
10.	"Mark of the Squealer" (Leeway cover)	Eddie Sutton	3:39
11.	"Teasn', Pleasn'" (Dangerous Toys cover; featuring Jason McMaster)	Jason McMaster, Tim Trembley	3:14
Total length:			41:47

== Personnel ==
Shadows Fall

- Brian Fair – vocals
- Jonathan Donais – lead guitar, vocals
- Matt Bachand – guitar, vocals
- Paul Romanko – bass
- Jason Bittner – drums

Additional performer

- Jason McMaster – guest vocals on "Teasn', Pleasn'"

Production

- Produced, engineered, and mixed by Zeuss and Shadows Fall
- Digital editing by Rob Gil
- Mastered by Alan Douches
- Cover art, art direction, design, and layout by Tom Bejgrowicz
- Photography and digital manipulation by Justin Borucki
- Band photograph by Bryan Helm
- "SF" logo by Don Naylor
- Themes and concepts by Brian Fair and Tom Bejgrowicz
