= Inspiration on Demand =

Single by Shadows Fall

from the album The War Within
- Released: June 4, 2005
- Recorded: April – May 2004
- Studio: Planet Z Studios in Hadley, Massachusetts
- Genre: Melodic metalcore
- Length: 3:52 (album version); 3:30 (edit)
- Label: Century Media
- Songwriter(s): Brian Fair; Jon Donais; Matt Bachand; Paul Romanko; Jason Bittner
- Producer(s): Chris "Zeuss" Harris; Shadows Fall

Shadows Fall singles chronology
"What Drives the Weak" (2005)	"Inspiration on Demand" (2005)	"Redemption" (2007)

"Inspiration on Demand" is the second single from Shadows Fall's album The War Within. The song charted at no. 33 on the Hot Mainstream Rock Tracks chart, making it the band's most successful single to date.

== Track listing ==
No.	Title	Length
1.	"Inspiration on Demand" (album version)	3:52
2.	"Inspiration on Demand" (edit)	3:30

== Music video ==
The video opens up with the band performing the song on top of a cliff in a canyon. Vocalist Brian Fair suddenly wakes up on a bed in the middle of a street, with a bus coming straight for him. Before the bus hits him, he suddenly transports inside of the bus. Fair exits the bus and begins wandering the streets of the city. Fair then appears in an elevator before he begins levitating. The video ends with the band members walking around the city with Fair being saved from the same bus in the beginning of the video.

== Personnel ==
- Brian Fair – lead vocals
- Jon Donais – lead guitar
- Matt Bachand – rhythm guitar, additional clean vocals
- Paul Romanko – bass
- Jason Bittner – drums
