= Somber Eyes to the Sky =

Studio album by Shadows Fall
- Released: November 30, 1997
- Recorded: 1997
- Studio: Zing (Westfield, Massachusetts)
- Genre: Melodic death metal; melodic metalcore
- Length: 48:27
- Label: Lifeless
- Producer: Adam Dutkiewicz, Jim Fogarty, Shadows Fall

Shadows Fall chronology
To Ashes (1997)	Somber Eyes to the Sky (1997)	Of One Blood (2000)

Somber Eyes to the Sky is the debut studio album by American heavy metal band Shadows Fall, released in 1997 on Matt Bachand's own label Lifeless Records in the United States, while the European release was handled by Genet Records. This was the band's last release and only studio album with lead singer Philip Labonte, who helped form All That Remains the following year.

== Background ==
Most of the album's songs had previously appeared on demo albums released by the band.

The songs "Lifeless", "Suffer the Season" and "Fleshold" originally appeared on the band's demo, Mourning a Dead World, released in 1996. The songs "Eternal" and "Somber Angel" were originally recorded and released on a demo EP in 1997. "To Ashes" originally appeared on the 7-inch EP of the same name, which was also released in 1997; the EP also contained a re-recording of "Fleshold".

Audio mastering was done at Monkeyhouse Studios in Northampton, Massachusetts.

== Music and lyrics ==
Somber Eyes to the Sky is different from the usual metalcore sound of the band's subsequent albums, featuring a lo-fi melodic death metal sound with elements of standard death metal. Phil Labonte's vocals are generally death growl vocals that resemble Glen Benton of death metal band Deicide. Melodic guitar riffs and occasional dissonant riffs are featured throughout the album. The lyrics are dreary, with themes like despair, depression, suicide, isolation and loneliness being featured throughout the album.

== Background, recording and release ==
In 1996, Shadows Fall recorded a demo called Mourning a Dead World, printing 200 copies. Guitarist Matt Bachand said the demo "was really intended just for us to work on things". People bought the demo and Shadows Fall began to have concerts. Bachand formed Lifeless Records to produce Somber Eyes to the Sky and both self-financed and self-promoted it. Genet Records of Belgium created a repress of the album, and Somber Eyes to the Sky sold 15,000 copies worldwide, including a few thousand in Europe. Somber Eyes to the Sky was recorded in Zing Recording Studios in Westfield, Massachusetts. Released on November 30, 1997, Somber Eyes to the Sky had success in late 1998 and early 1999 on CMJ New Music Report's Loud Rock airplay chart, reaching the top ten and remaining on the chart for several weeks.

== Touring and promotion ==
Shadows Fall toured in 1998 and opened for Six Feet Under, Overcast and Shai Hulud. Other shows the band had included the Cleveland "World Series of Metal" event, Milwaukee Metalfest, and one show on the Van Warped package tour. In the fall of 1998, Phil Labonte left Shadows Fall and was replaced by Brian Fair. In a later interview in 2007, Labonte explained why he left Shadows Fall:

What happened was Brian [Fair], who is their current singer, the band that he was in broke up. When I tried out, they were like, "Oh, can you do stuff like Brian from Overcast?" And I was like, "OK, I'll try." I kind of had my own sound. I didn't sound like Brian, and when he became available, they were like, "Look, we want to get another singer. We want to get Brian." I was like, "Okay. Cool." There's no hard feelings or anything like that 'cause I knew it was the dude they had in mind in the first place and also I had already started writing stuff for All That Remains. We had probably three songs put together, so I was just like, "Alright, whatever." Shadows Fall wasn't — I mean, obviously Shadows Fall wasn't nearly as far along as they are now. They didn't even have a record deal at the time. So it's not like it was like, "Oh god, what could have been," you know? It was like, "Whatever." And last time we played here with Shadows Fall, it wasn't sold out. And they were headlining. We're headlining tonight and it's sold out, so I'm not sweating. I'm not sweating. I don't worry about what Shadows Fall does anymore, not even a little bit. I was never the dude that was like, "Oh my god." It never bothered me. We were always friends and stuff like that, but now, whatever. I don't care.

Fair replaced Labonte after Fair's previous band Overcast disbanded. Shadows Fall then performed again at the Milwaukee Metalfest and the New Jersey March Metal Meltdown. This caught the attention of Century Media Records, and the record label signed Shadows Fall in late 1999. A headline show earned Shadows Fall the top billing for the New England "Metal & Hardcore" festival in 2000.

== Track listing ==
No.	Title	Lyrics	Length
1.	"Revel in My Loss"		5:48
2.	"Pure"		6:11
3.	"Lead Me Home"	Instrumental	2:58
4.	"To Ashes"		5:53
5.	"Nurture"		5:16
6.	"Fleshold"		3:44
7.	"Eternal"		4:07
8.	"Suffer the Season"		4:12
9.	"Somber Angel"		6:34
10.	"Lifeless"		3:44
Total length:			48:27

== Personnel ==
Adapted from the album's liner notes.

=== Shadows Fall ===
- Shadows Fall – audio mixing, & music
  - Philip Labonte – lead vocals; lyrics
  - Jon Donais – lead guitar, backing vocals; co-lyrics (6), & (8)
  - Matt Bachand – rhythm guitar, clean vocals
  - Paul Romanko – bass
  - David Germain – drums

=== Additional credits ===
==== Additional musicians ====
- Carrie Beth Nickerson – violin
- Jim Fogarty – additional sounds

==== Artwork ====
- Scott Lee – band photography
- Tobias Dutkiewicz – artwork

==== Additional mixing ====
- Adam Dutkiewicz
- Jim Fogarty

==== Additional lyricist ====
- Damien McPherson – (6), (8), & (10)

== Bibliography ==
- Sharpe-Young, Garry (2005). New Wave of American Heavy Metal. Zonda Books. ISBN 9780958268400.
