= What Drives the Weak =

Single by Shadows Fall

from the album The War Within
- Released: March 22, 2005
- Recorded: April – May 2004
- Studio: Planet Z Studios in Hadley, MA
- Genre: Melodic metalcore
- Length: 4:44 (album version); 4:09 (edit)
- Label: Century Media
- Songwriters: Matt Bachand, Jason Bittner, Jonathan Donais, Brian Fair, Paul Romanko
- Producers: Chris "Zeuss" Harris, Shadows Fall

Shadows Fall singles chronology
"Destroyer of Senses" (2003)	"What Drives the Weak" (2005)	"Inspiration on Demand" (2005)

"What Drives the Weak" is the second single by Shadows Fall from their album The War Within. The song peaked at Number 38 on the Hot Mainstream Rock Tracks chart.

The song was nominated for a Grammy Award for Best Metal Performance at the 48th Annual Grammy Awards, but lost to "Before I Forget" by Slipknot.

== Music video ==
The song's music video was directed by Zach Merck.

The video shows the band performing the song in a house inhabited by bikers. The video is inter-cut with shots of vocalist Brian Fair wandering around the house and encountering weird happenings while the other members interact with the bikers.

== Track listing ==
No.	Title	Length
1.	"What Drives the Weak" (Edit)	4:09
2.	"What Drives the Weak" (Album Version)	4:44
3.	"What Drives the Weak" (Music Video)	4:44

== Personnel ==
- Brian Fair – lead vocals
- Jonathan Donais – lead guitar, backing vocals
- Matt Bachand – rhythm guitar, clean vocals
- Paul Romanko – bass
- Jason Bittner – drums
