= Deadworld (EP) =

EP by Shadows Fall
- Released: August 22, 2001
- Genre: Melodic death metal, metalcore
- Label: Century Media
- Producer: Chris "Zeuss" Harris, Shadows Fall

Shadows Fall chronology
Of One Blood (2000)	Deadworld (2001)	The Art of Balance (2002)

Deadworld is an EP only released in Japan by American heavy metal band Shadows Fall. The song "Stepping Outside the Circle" was re-recorded in 2002 for the band's third studio album The Art of Balance. The EP's title track, "Deadworld", originally appeared on the band's 1996 demo Mourning a Dead World.

== Track listing ==
All lyrics are written by Brian Fair, except where noted; all music is composed by Shadows Fall.

No.	Title	Lyrics	Length
1.	"Deadworld"	Damien McPherson, Matt Bachand	4:47
2.	"Stepping Outside the Circle"		5:14
3.	"Crushing Belial" (live)		5:26
4.	"The First Noble Truth" (live)	Fair, Bachand	4:13
5.	"Fleshold" (live)	McPherson, Bachand	3:47

== Personnel ==
Shadows Fall

- Brian Fair – vocals
- Jonathan Donais – lead guitar, backing vocals
- Matt Bachand – guitar, backing vocals
- Paul Romanko – bass

Additional musicians

- Derek Kerswill – drums (tracks 1–2)
- David Germain – drums (tracks 3–5)

Production

- Tracks 1–2 produced by Zeuss and Shadows Fall, and engineered and mixed by Zeuss
- Tracks 3–4 recorded live at WERS studio in Boston on April 16, 2000
- Track 5 recorded live at CBGB in Manhattan on November 26, 2000
- Artwork by Kirk Maetani, Satoshi Wakita, Maiko Tanimoto
- Photographs by Jiro Maetani
