= Death Ray Vision =

American hardcore punk band

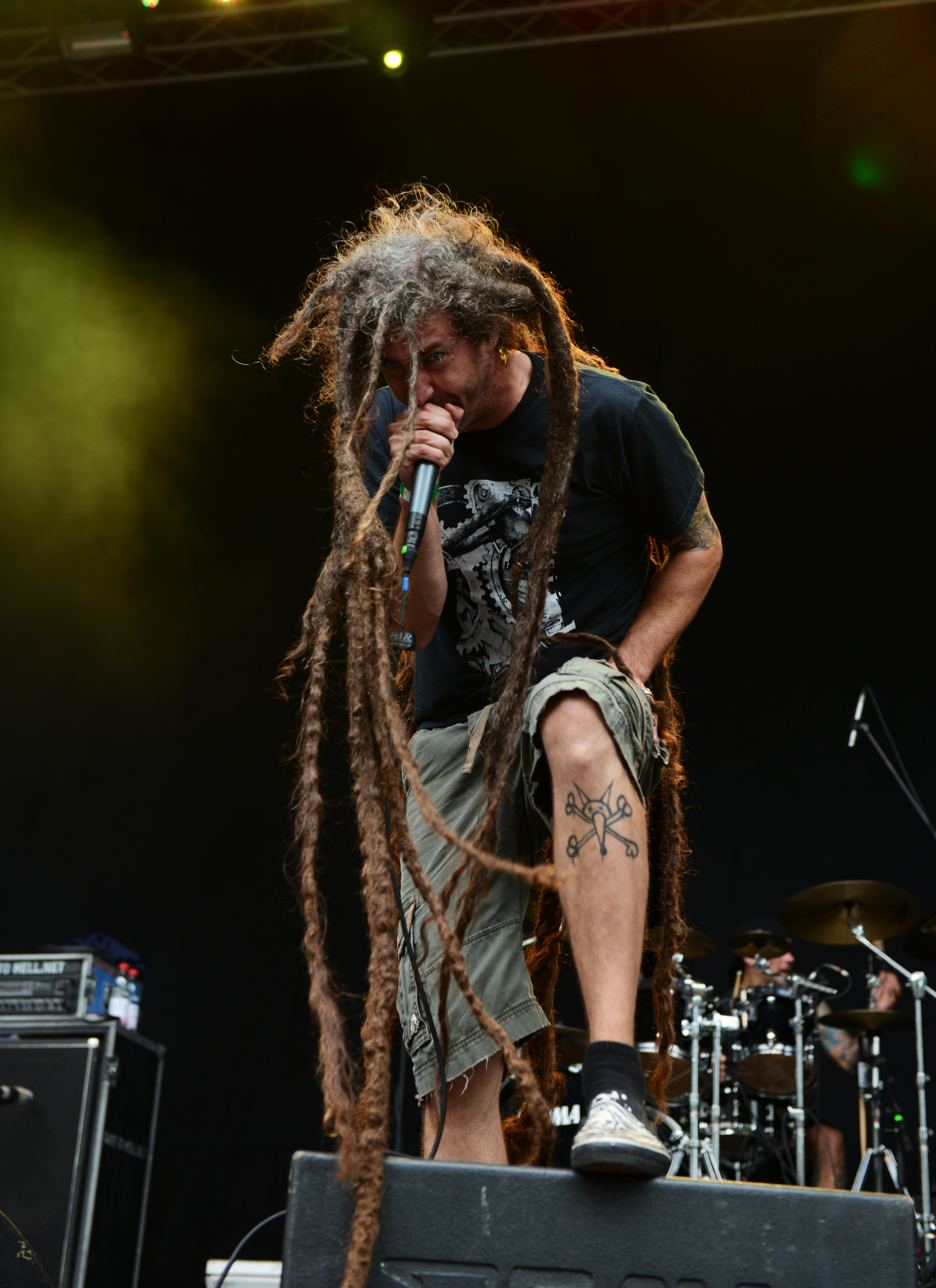
- Former vocalist Brian Fair

Background information
- Origin: Massachusetts, U.S.
- Genres: Crossover thrash, hardcore punk, metalcore
- Years active: 2010–present
- Members: Keith Bennett; Pete Cortese; Chris Rosati; Colin Conway; Mike D'Antonio
- Past members: Brian Fair; Zack Wells; Jeff Gard
- Website: deathrayvision.com

Death Ray Vision is an American hardcore punk/thrash metal band from Massachusetts. It includes members and former members of the bands Killswitch Engage, Shadows Fall, Cannae, Seemless, and Overcast.

The band released their first studio album titled We Ain't Leavin' Till You're Bleedin' in 2013. They also released an EP in 2011 titled Get Lost or Get Dead. In 2018, they released a second LP titled Negative Mental Attitude. The band's third album, No Mercy from Electric Eyes, was released in the summer of 2023.

== Members ==
=== Current members ===
- Pete Cortese – guitars (2010–present)
- Mike D'Antonio – bass (2010–present)
- Colin Conway – drums (2010–present)
- Chris Rosati – guitars (2018–present)
- Keith Bennett – vocals (2023–present)

=== Former members ===
- Brian Fair – vocals (2010–2018)
- Zack Wells – guitars (2010–2018)
- Jeff Gard – vocals (2018–2023)

== Discography ==
=== Studio albums ===
- We Ain't Leavin' Till You're Bleedin (2013) (vocals: Brian Fair)
- Negative Mental Attitude (2018) (vocals: Jeff Gard)
- No Mercy from Electric Eyes (2023) (vocals: Keith Bennett)

=== EPs ===
- Get Lost or Get Dead (2011)

== Awards and nominations ==
Boston Music Awards

Year	Nominee / work	Award	Result
2023	Death Ray Vision	Metal Band of the Year	Nominated
