= Redemption (Shadows Fall song) =

Single by Shadows Fall

from the album Threads of Life
- Released: February 14, 2007
- Recorded: September 2006
- Genre: Thrash metal
- Length: 4:17 (Album Version); 3:40 (Music Video Version)
- Label: Atlantic
- Songwriters: Matt Bachand, Jason Bittner, Jonathan Donais, Brian Fair, Paul Romanko
- Producer: Nick Raskulinecz

Shadows Fall singles chronology
"Inspiration on Demand" (2005)	"Redemption" (2007)	"Another Hero Lost" (2007)

"Redemption" is the lead single from the album Threads of Life by American heavy metal band Shadows Fall. It has a thrash melodic with heavy riffs. The song made its premiere on Sirius Radio's Hard Attack station on February 16, 2007, and was released on iTunes on February 20. The song was sent to radio in March. On December 6, 2007, Redemption was nominated for a Grammy for Best Metal Performance. On November 12, 2007, the group performed the song on The Daily Habit. It appeared on the game Madden NFL 08.

The bands lead singer Brian Fair stated "The song is a celebration of the power of music and the human voice as an agent of change."

The song reached number 36 on the US Mainstream Rock chart and number one on Media guides survey of Metal Specialty Tracks.

== Track listing ==
No.	Title	Length
1.	"Redemption" (album version)	4:19
2.	"Redemption" (edit)	3:35
3.	"Redemption" (instrumental)	4:17

== Music video ==
The band filmed a music video for "Redemption", directed by Zach Merck. Filmed in Los Angeles, it shows the band playing the song on a roof. The video debuted on MTV Headbangers Ball on March 26, 2007.

== Chart position ==
Chart (2007)	Peak position
US Mainstream Rock (Billboard)	36

== Personnel ==
=== Shadows Fall ===
- Brian Fair – lead vocals
- Jonathan Donais – lead guitar
- Matt Bachand – rhythm guitar, backing vocals
- Paul Romanko – bass guitar
- Jason Bittner – drums
