= Melodic metalcore =

Subgenre of metalcore

- Stylistic origins: Melodic death metal; metalcore
- Cultural origins: Late 1990s – early 2000s, United States and United Kingdom
- Typical instruments: Electric guitar; bass guitar; drums; vocals

Regional scenes
- Belgium; Massachusetts; Ohio; United Kingdom

Local scenes
- Boston

Other topics
- Melodic hardcore; post-hardcore; Swedish death metal; deathcore

Melodic metalcore is a fusion genre, incorporating elements of melodic death metal and metalcore; it has a heavy emphasis on melodic instrumentation, distorted guitar tones, palm muting, double bass drumming, blast beats, metalcore-stylized breakdowns, and vocals that range from aggressive screaming and death growls to clean singing. The genre has seen commercial success for employing a more accessible sound at times compared to other forms of extreme music. Many notable melodic metalcore bands have been influenced by At the Gates and In Flames.

== History ==
=== Origins ===
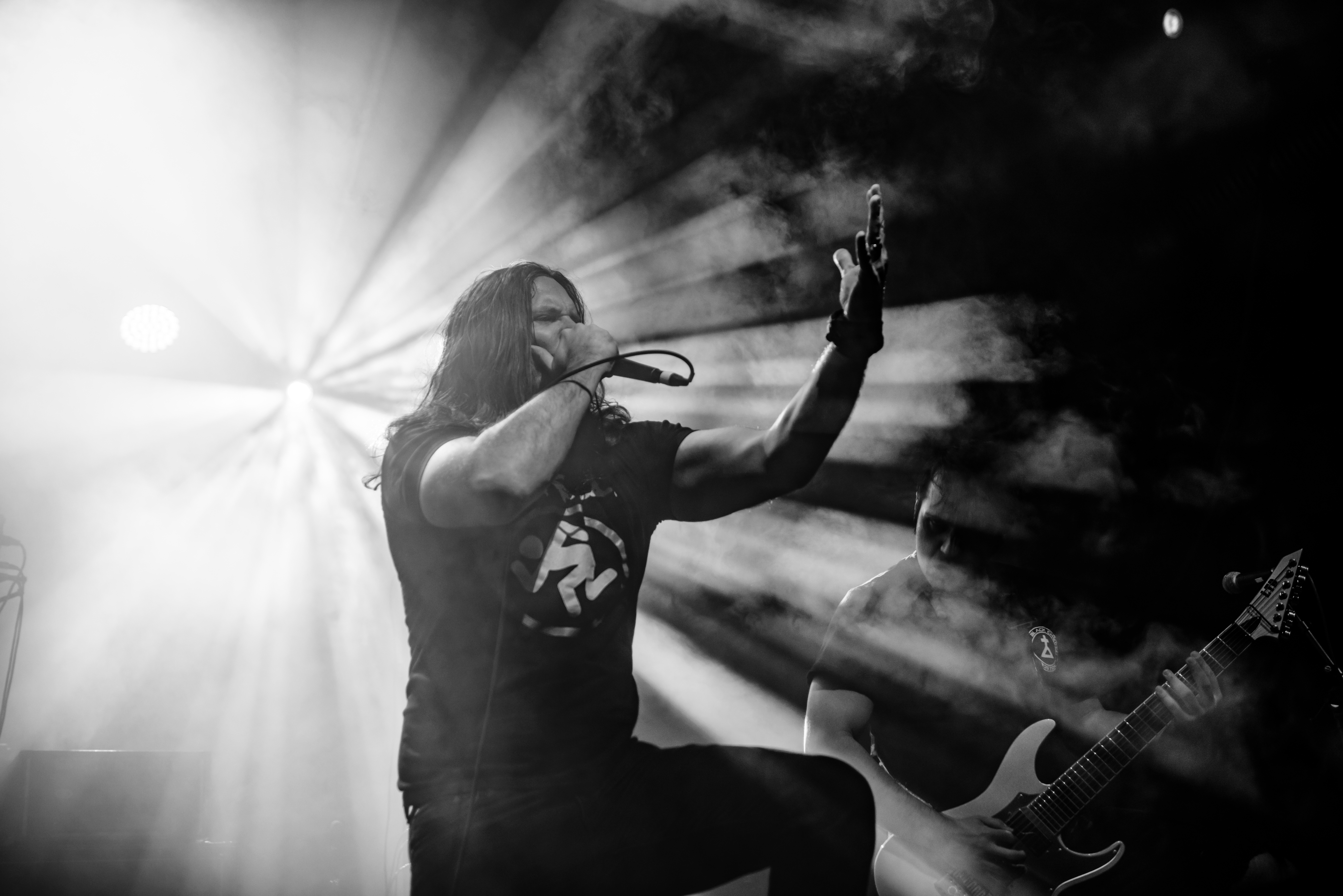
Unearth performing in 2016

In the late 1990s, a wave of metalcore bands began incorporating elements of melodic death metal into their sound. This formed an early version of what would become the melodic metalcore genre. The first band to make use of this fusion was Overcast, who were soon followed by Shadows Fall on Somber Eyes to the Sky (1997), Undying on This Day All Gods Die (1999), Darkest Hour on The Prophecy Fulfilled (1999), Unearth on Above the Fall of Man (1999) and Prayer for Cleansing on Rain in Endless Fall (1999). CMJ writer Anthony Delia also credited Florida's Poison the Well and their first two releases The Opposite of December... A Season of Separation (1999) and Tear from the Red (2002) as "design[ing] the template for most of" the melodic metalcore bands to come. Killswitch Engage have also been called a pioneering force in the genre by publications such as Revolver, along with artists such as 7 Angels 7 Plagues, Chimaira, Dead to Fall and Heaven Shall Burn. Belgian groups also played a large part in the development of the genre in its early years, as bands such as Arkangel began embracing the sounds of melodic death metal in their traditional metalcore sound, as early as 1998.

=== Commercial success ===
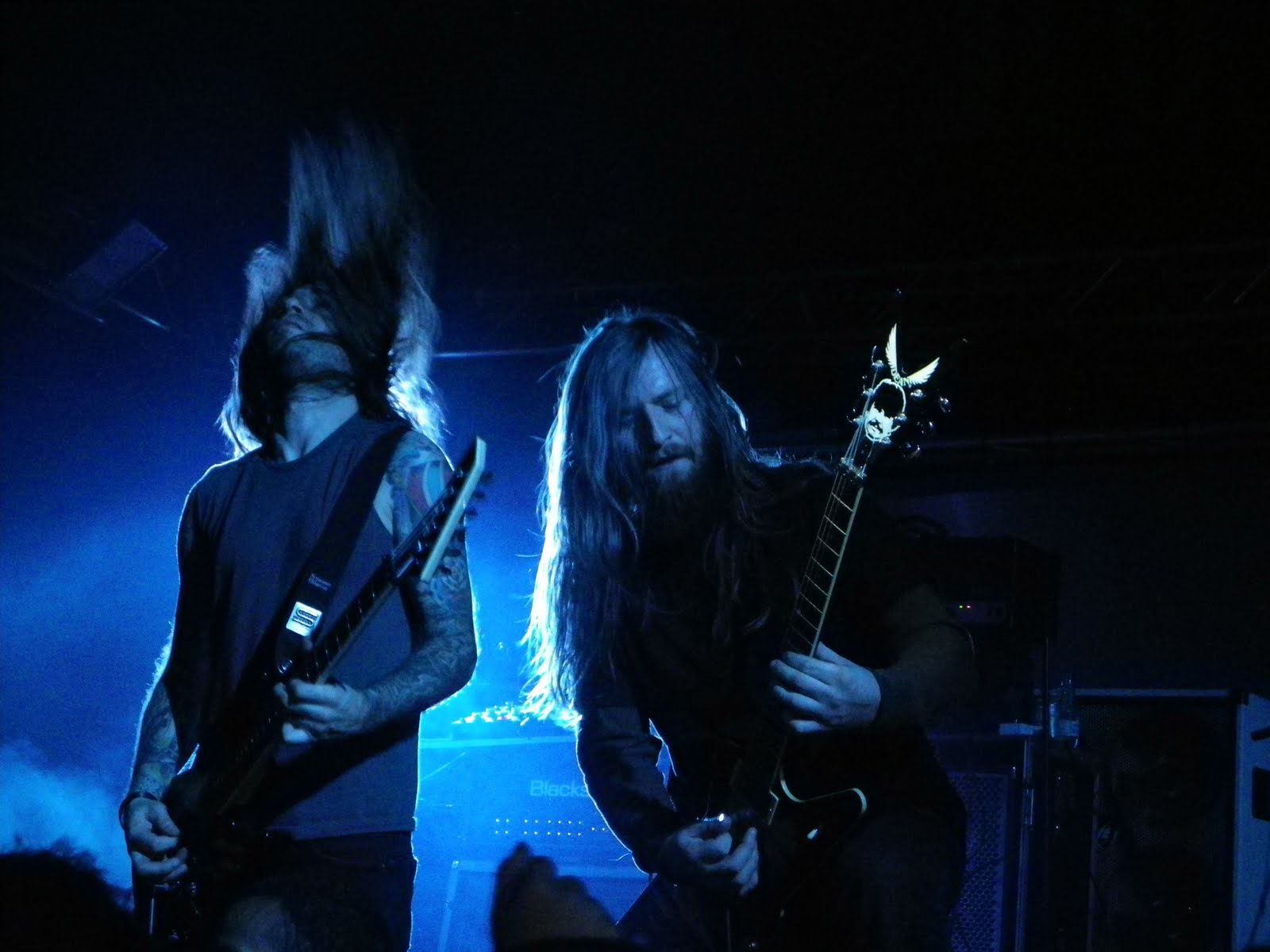
Melodic metalcore band Darkest Hour

Killswitch Engage released their sophomore album Alive or Just Breathing in 2002, which has been noted as a significant influence on many bands to follow, such as Jinjer, August Burns Red and Miss May I. By 2004 the genre saw increasing prominence, with Shadows Fall's The War Within debuting at number 20 on the Billboard album chart. Trivium released their sophomore album, Ascendancy, in 2005, which peaked at 75 on the UK Albums Chart, made the band one of the more prominent bands in the scene at that point, despite changing their style away from melodic metalcore on many occasions. Killswitch Engage's 2006 effort As Daylight Dies was described by Brandon Tadday of Overdrive Magazine as "without a doubt one of the most impactful releases for melodic metalcore during the mid-2000s", peaking at number 32 on the Billboard 200 and spending 22 weeks in the charts, being certified Platinum by the RIAA in 2021. In 2008 the All That Remains' single "Two Weeks" peaked at number 9 at the Mainstream Rock Tracks chart in the U.S., and on the Modern Rock Tracks chart at number 38. In 2007, the song "Nothing Left" by As I Lay Dying was nominated for a Grammy award in the "Best Metal Performance" category. An Ocean Between Us (the album that included "Nothing Left") itself was a commercial success, debuting at number 8 on the Billboard 200.

Welsh melodic metalcore band Bullet for My Valentine's third album Fever debuted at number 3 selling more than 71,000 copies in its first week in the U.S. and more than 21,000 copies in the UK during 2010 alone. Australian melodic metalcore band Parkway Drive's third album Deep Blue reached number three on the Billboard Rock Charts in 2010, along with Miss May I's album Rise of the Lion having reached number 6 in 2014. Melodic metalcore band Bury Tomorrow's fifth studio album Black Flame reached number eleven on the Billboard albums chart in less than a week.

== Characteristics ==
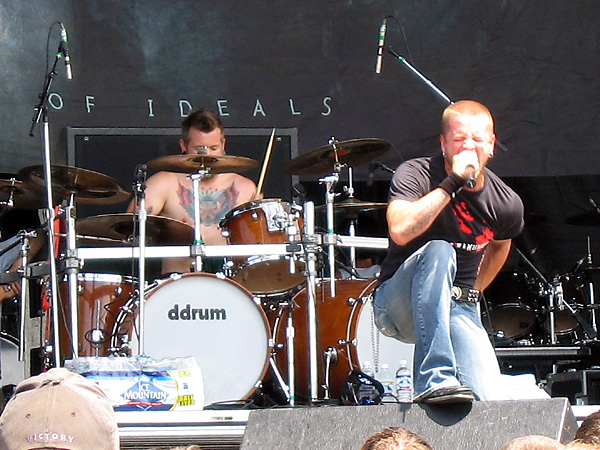
Melodic metalcore band All That Remains performing at the Ozzfest in 2006

Melodic metalcore bands often take influence from the guitar riffs and writing styles of Swedish melodic death metal bands, especially At the Gates, In Flames, Arch Enemy and Soilwork. Practitioners of the genre tend to make use of instrumental melody, and many prominently feature clean singing alongside typical death metal growls and screams. Melodic metalcore often promotes "very positive lyrical content." The genre can also feature harmonic guitar riffs, tremolo picking, double bass drums and metalcore-stylized breakdowns. Bands such as Trivium, As I Lay Dying and Bullet for My Valentine take a significant influence from thrash metal.

== See also ==
- List of melodic metalcore bands
- List of metalcore bands
- Melodic hardcore
- Post-hardcore
- Swedish death metal
