= Overcast (band) =

American metalcore band

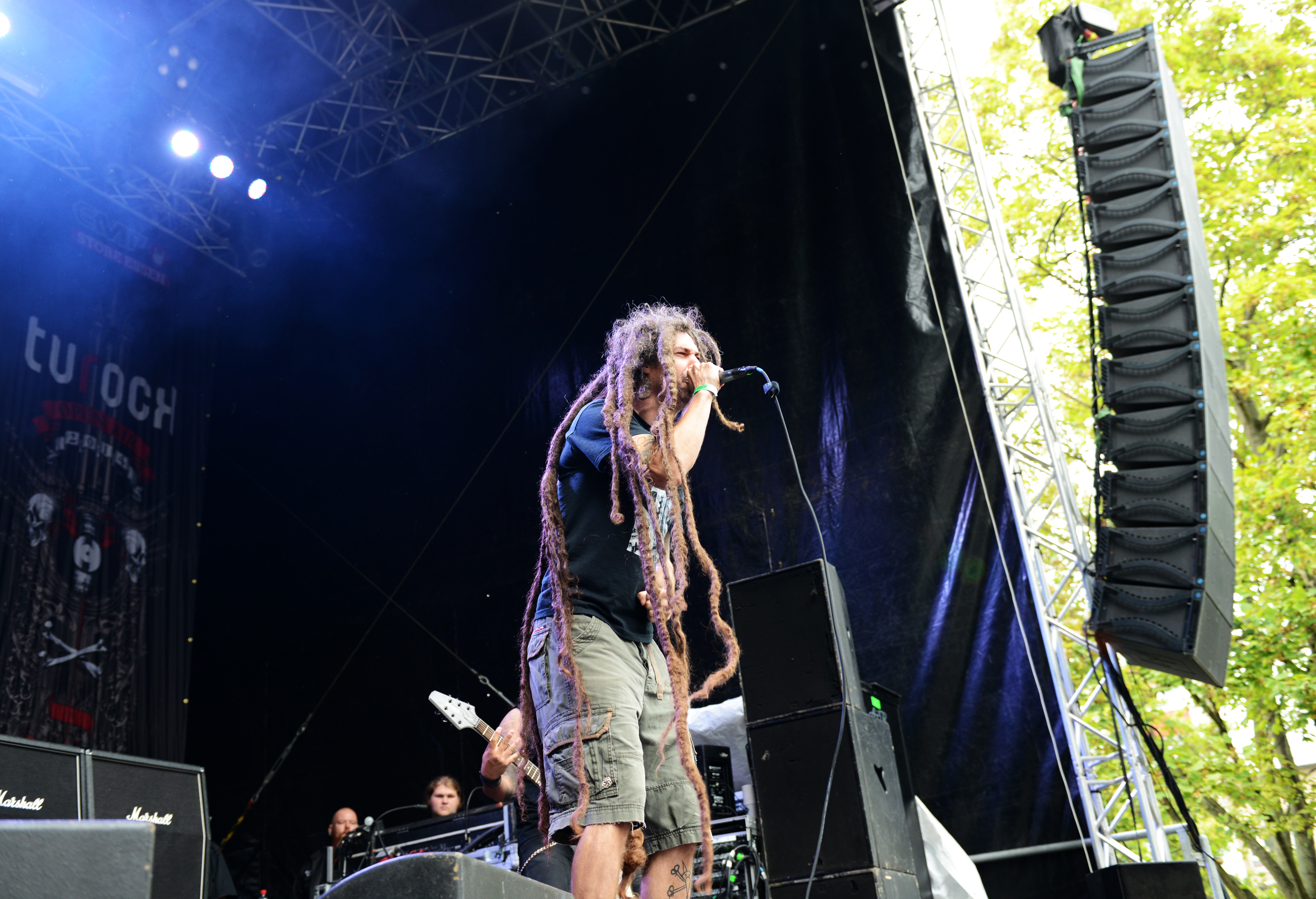
- Vocalist Brian Fair in 2014

Background information
- Origin: Boston, Massachusetts, U.S.
- Genre: Metalcore
- Years active: 1990–1998; 2006–2008; 2014–2018; 2022; 2024; 2026
- Labels: Endless Fight; Edison; Metal Blade; Bullet Tooth
- Past members: Mike D'Antonio; Brian Fair; Pete Cortese; Jay Fitzgerald; Shawn Rounds; Scott McCooe

Overcast was an American metalcore band that formed in Boston and was initially active from 1990 to 1998. The band is often regarded as pioneers of metalcore. Since 2006, the band has made sporadic reunions playing festivals and short tours.

== History ==
Overcast formed in 1990 in Boston. It was co-founded by lead singer Brian Fair and bass player Mike D'Antonio. While Fair was on vocals, Scott McCooe and Pete Cortese played guitars, and Jay Fitzgerald played drums. Overcast's first 7-inch, Bleed Into One, was released in 1992 through Exchange Records. The band's first full-length, Expectational Dilution, was released in 1994 and is considered a groundbreaking effort as many claim that Overcast are the pioneers of the metalcore scene. Their final full-length, Fight Ambition To Kill, was released in 1997.

The album was followed by a nation wide tour with Shai Hulud and Disembodied. The band broke up in 1998 following the tour. Following the disbandment of Overcast, several members would go on to join other bands. Vocalist Brian Fair joined Shadows Fall in 1999, bassist Mike D'Antonio co-founded Killswitch Engage in 1999, and guitarist Pete Cortese was briefly in Killswitch Engage from 2000 to 2001.

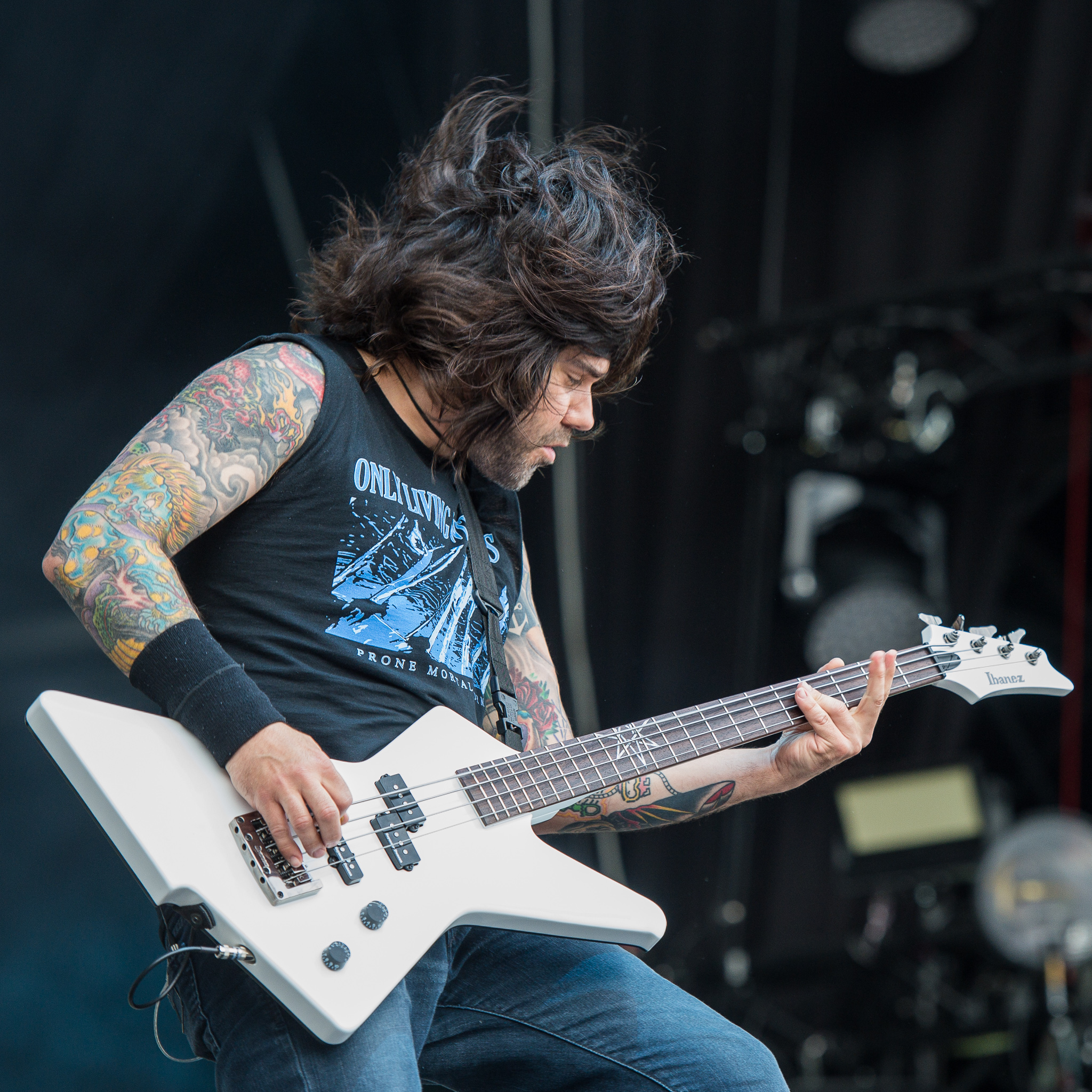
Bass player Mike D'Antonio in 2016

In 2006, they reunited to play the 2006 installment of the New England Metal and Hardcore Festival, and announced that they would release a new album entitled Reborn to Kill Again with 11 re-recorded classic tracks (12 if including the European edition bonus track), one re-recorded track from the Shadows Fall album Of One Blood, and one new track. In 2011, ex-Overcast bandmates Mike D'Antonio, Pete Cortese and Brian Fair announced the formation of their new side-project, Death Ray Vision.

From 2014-2018, Overcast played select live shows. In 2015 a compilation album was released called Only Death is Smiling: 1991–1998.

In 2022, the group reunited again to play a couple of shows in Massachusetts and New York marking their first performances in four years. The group then returned again playing three shows in 2024, including two at that years New England Metal and Hardcore Festival, and one supporting Unearth.

Overcast returned on October 11, 2026, to headline a show at the Alchemy, in Providence, Rhode Island.

== Members ==
- Mike D'Antonio – bass (1990–1998; 2006–2008; 2014–2018; 2022; 2024)
- Brian Fair – vocals (1990–1998; 2006–2008; 2014–2018; 2022; 2024)
- Pete Cortese – rhythm guitar (1990–1998; 2006–2008; 2014–2018; 2022; 2024)
- Jay Fitzgerald – drums (1990–1998; 2006–2008; 2014–2018; 2022; 2024)
- Shawn Rounds – lead guitar (1990–1995)
- Scott McCooe – lead guitar (1995–1998; 2006–2008; 2014–2018; 2022; 2024)

== Discography ==
=== Studio albums ===
- Expectational Dilution (1994)
- Fight Ambition to Kill (1997)
- Reborn to Kill Again (2008)

=== Extended plays ===
- Bleed into One (1992)
- Stirring the Killer (1993)
- Twin Terror Split (1995)
- Begging for Indifference (1996)
- Overcast / Arise Split (1996)
- In These Black Days Vol. 4 Split (1998)

=== Compilation albums ===
- Only Death is Smiling: 1991–1998 (2015)
