= Shadows Fall =

American metal band

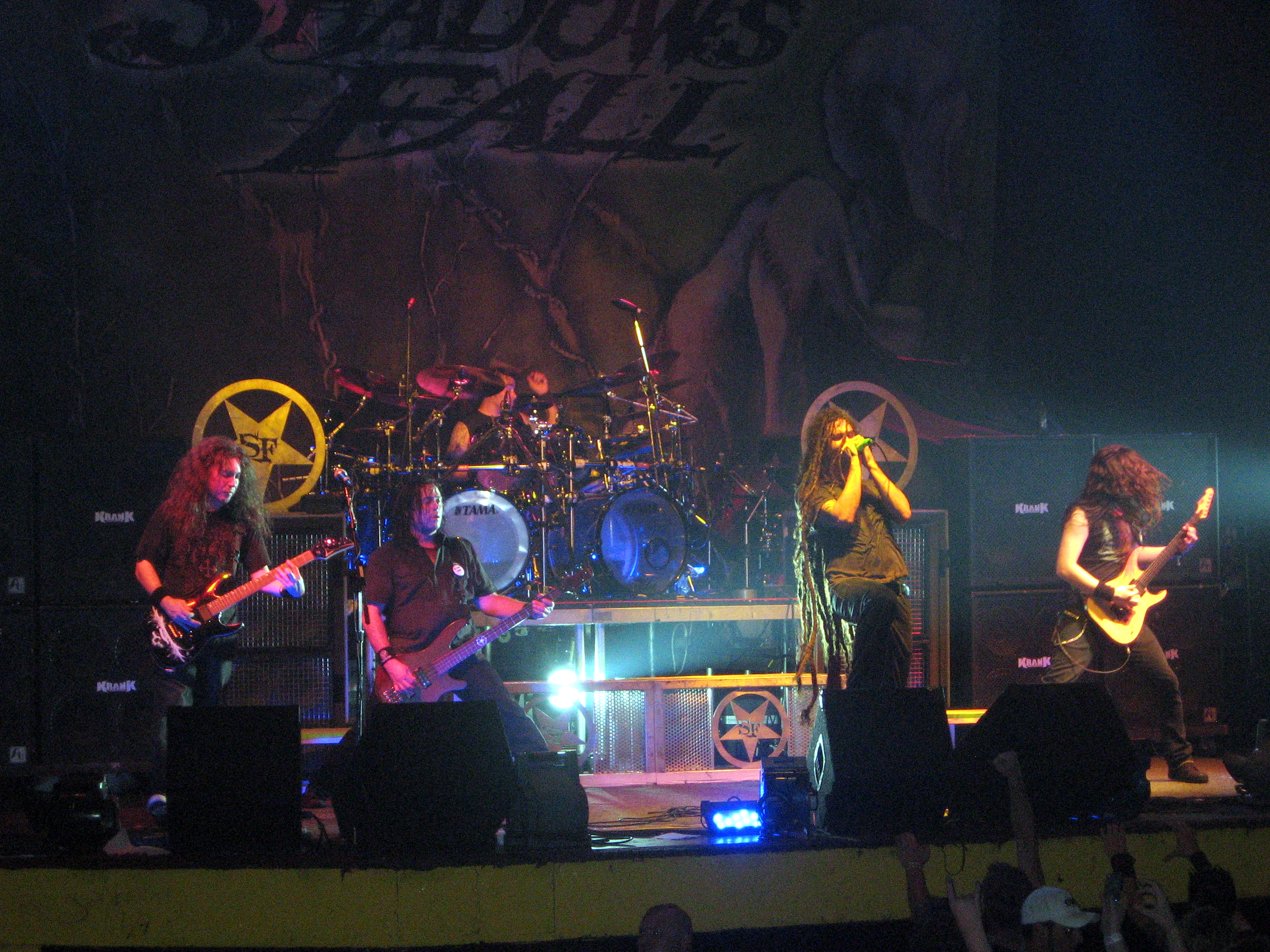
- Shadows Fall performing in 2007. From left to right: Matt Bachand, Paul Romanko, Jason Bittner, Brian Fair, and Jonathan Donais.

Background information
- Origin: Springfield, Massachusetts, U.S.
- Genres: Metalcore; thrash metal; melodic death metal
- Years active: 1996–2015; 2021–present
- Labels: Lifeless; Genet; Century Media; Atlantic; Roadrunner; Everblack; Ferret; Spinefarm; Razor & Tie; MNRK Heavy
- Spinoffs: All That Remains
- Members: Jonathan Donais; Matt Bachand; Paul Romanko; Brian Fair; Jason Bittner
- Past members: David Germain; Damien McPherson; Mark Laliberte; Philip Labonte; Derek Kerswill

Shadows Fall is an American heavy metal band from Springfield, Massachusetts, formed in 1996. Although Shadows Fall has experienced several line-up changes, for most of its recording career, Shadows Fall has been composed of guitarists Jonathan Donais and Matt Bachand, bassist Paul Romanko, lead vocalist Brian Fair and drummer Jason Bittner.

Shadows Fall has released seven studio albums, three compilation albums and two DVDs. The band's first album featured Philip Labonte (of All That Remains) on lead vocals, but he was soon replaced by Fair. Shadows Fall's first two studio albums featured David Germain playing drums; however, in 2002, Bittner joined the band full-time. The band are a two-time Grammy Award nominee in the category Best Metal Performance for their songs "What Drives the Weak" and "Redemption". Their most recent studio album Fire from the Sky was released on May 15, 2012 and was the first to be produced by Adam Dutkiewicz since the band's first studio release.

Shadows Fall announced in August 2014 that they were going to go on an indefinite hiatus, and by the following summer, they had wrapped up what was planned to be their farewell tour. The band reunited for its first show in six years in December 2021 in their native Massachusetts, and discussed the possibility of recording new material. In 2024, they released new material for the first time in twelve years, with a single titled "In the Grey."

== History ==
=== Formation and Somber Eyes to the Sky (1996–1997) ===
Shadows Fall was formed in 1996 by guitarists Jonathan Donais and Matt Bachand, who were good friends from the local music scene. Bachand had previously been a founding member of a death metal band and Donais a member of the metalcore band Aftershock. Later on, the band found a complete lineup with the addition of Damien McPherson (vocals), Mark Laliberte (bass), and David Germain (drums). Also in 1996, Adam Dutkiewicz performed live drums to fill in for Germain. By late 1996, the band recorded and released a demo titled Mourning a Dead World, of which only about 200 copies were produced. It consisted of the songs Lifeless, Suffer the Season, Fleshold, Forever Lost, A Souls Salvation, and Deadworld. McPherson decided to leave the band and was replaced by Philip Labonte in 1997. Around the same time, bass guitarist Paul Romanko, formally of the hardcore band Pushbutton Warfare, was recruited as a permanent replacement for Laliberte, who had originally joined temporarily. Now with a more solid lineup, the band released its first EP, To Ashes, with Dutkiewicz playing as a session drummer. The band's name, according to Bachand, comes from the title of a comic book published in the early 1990s.

Shadows Fall toured the New England area opening for artists such as Fear Factory and Cannibal Corpse. On November 30, 1997, the band released its first studio album Somber Eyes to the Sky through Bachand's recording label, Lifeless Records.

=== Of One Blood (1998–2000) ===
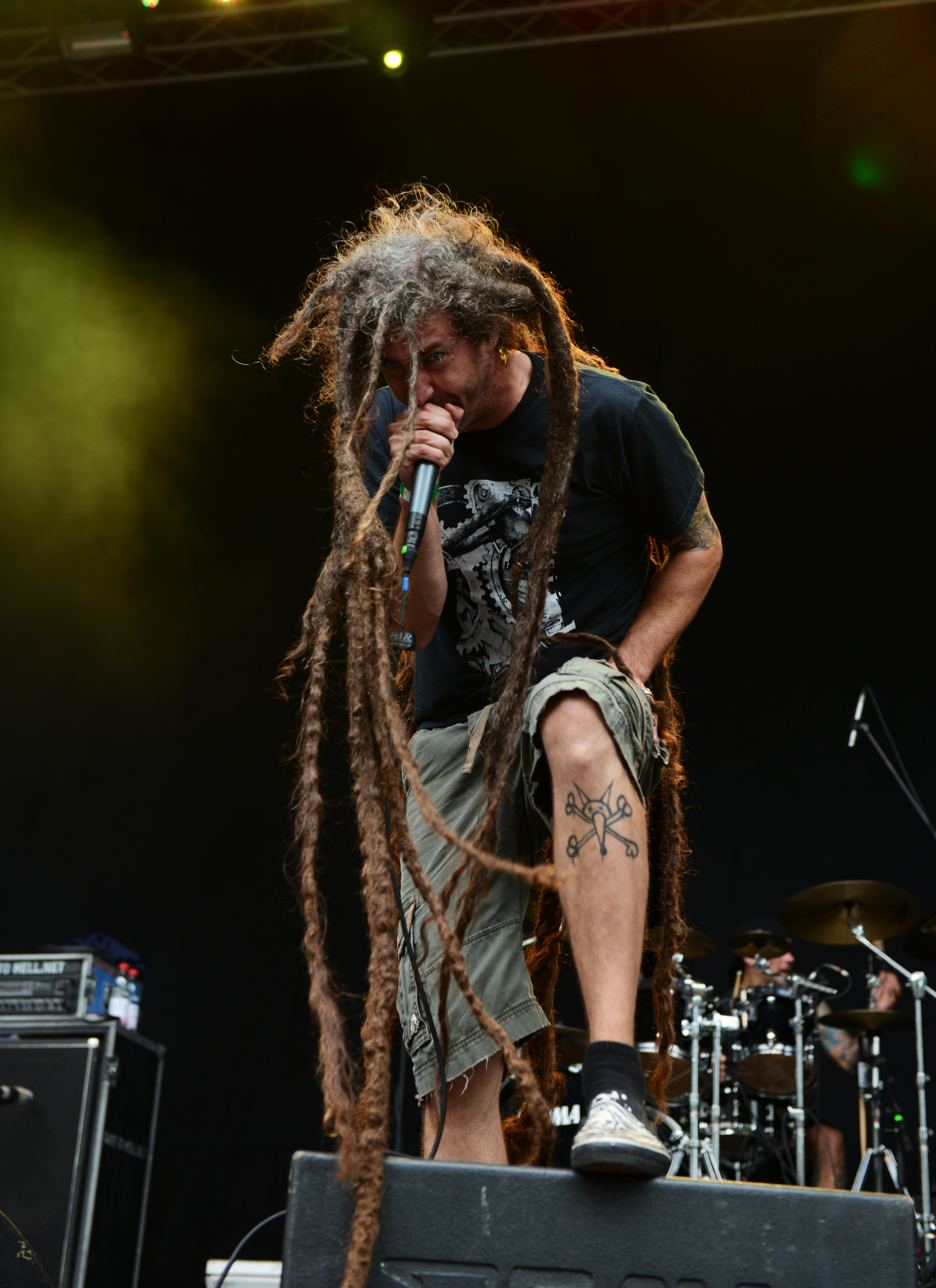
Brian Fair, 2014

In 1998, Labonte was asked to leave the band due to personal and artistic differences. He had ideas for a side project while a member of the band and went on to form All That Remains. The band searched for a replacement vocalist and eventually recruited Milford, Massachusetts native Brian Fair from Overcast. The band had been friends with Fair for years. After a US Summer tour with Shai Hulud, Overcast disbanded—and the band asked Fair to join Shadows Fall.

In a 2007 interview with Blabbermouth.net Labonte commented on his departure from the band stating

What happened was Brian [Fair], who is their current singer, the band that he was in broke up. I didn't sound like Brian, and when he became available, they were like, "Look, we want to get another singer. We want to get Brian." I was like, "Okay. Cool." There's no hard feelings or anything like that 'cause I knew it was the dude they had in mind in the first place and also I had already started writing stuff for All That Remains.

While on tour, Shadows Fall was signed to Century Media Records. The band recorded its second studio album Of One Blood with Fair on vocals in 2000, and the release included re-recorded songs from Somber Eyes to the Sky. That same year, the group started to tour heavily for the first time and took part in the “International Extreme Music Festival” tour. In 2001, David Germain decided to leave the band due to alcoholism, and was replaced by former Stigmata and Burning Human drummer Jason Bittner.

=== The Art of Balance (2001–2003) ===
Due to repeated comparisons with Gothenburg melodic death metal bands, Shadows Fall decided to change its style. Inspired by more thrash, hard rock and power ballad influences, the band recorded its third studio album, titled The Art of Balance. Released on September 17, 2002, the album peaked at number 15 on the Billboard Top Independent albums chart. Shadows Fall released three music videos to promote the album; "Thoughts Without Words", "Destroyer of Senses", and "The Idiot Box". The Art of Balance featured a cover of the Pink Floyd song "Welcome to the Machine." Andy Hinds of AllMusic stated the album is "a modern heavy metal album that is both brutal and highly musical, traditional yet forward-thinking", but criticized the placement of "Welcome to the Machine", stating the song "is stylishly well-executed, but seems a tad out of place nonetheless." Shadows Fall supported The Art of Balance by touring on Ozzfest in 2003. During their time at Ozzfest they were dubbed as the breakout band of the year and consistently sold more records every week than the other side-stage bands. Later that same year, they co-headlined the “MTV2 Headbangers Ball” tour alongside Killswitch Engage and Lamb of God. From September to October of that year they took part in the "Take Action" tour with bands such as Avenge Sevenfold and Poison the Well.

The Art of Balance helped gain the band their first bit of notoriety, and during this period the group was named one of Top Five Bands in Metal Today by Alternative Press, also being voted Best New Talent in a Revolver readers poll beating out both Evanescence and Lamb of God.

=== The War Within (2004–2006) ===
The band were selected to headline the first Strhess tour in early 2004. Shadows Fall then released its fourth studio album The War Within on September 21, 2004. It was the first release to enter the Billboard 200 for the band at number 20 and peaked at number one on the Top Independent albums chart. In promotion for the album, Shadows Fall released four music videos over the course of one year; "The Power of I and I", "What Drives the Weak", "Inspiration on Demand", and "Enlightened By the Cold". The albums two Singles What Drives the Weak" and "Inspiration on Demand" both became the bands first songs to reach the US Mainstream Rock chart both reaching the top 40.

The song "What Drives the Weak" garnered the band their first Grammy Award nomination for Best Metal Performance in 2006 at the 48th Annual Grammy Awards, though the award went to Slipknot for the song "Before I Forget". "The Light That Blinds" was featured in the video game Guitar Hero II. Wade Kergan of AllMusic praised the album stating the band has "grown beyond the confines of the metal-loving hardcore crowd anyway, with more in common now with the classic thrash of Metallica than the metal-tinged hardcore of Coalesce". A reviewer for Ultimate Guitar gave the album a 10/10 stating “This album in one day changed the way that I personally look at metal. I knew this record had potential to be great and I was right.”

Later that year, they embarked on a tour alongside Damageplan in support of The War Within. In 2005, the band once again performed on Ozzfest, but this time as a mainstage act which made them the first New Wave of American Heavy Metal band to achieve the honor. They also toured alongside Slipknot and Lamb of God for a U.S. arena tour in March. They were dubbed the "Band To Watch In 2005" by Spin magazine.

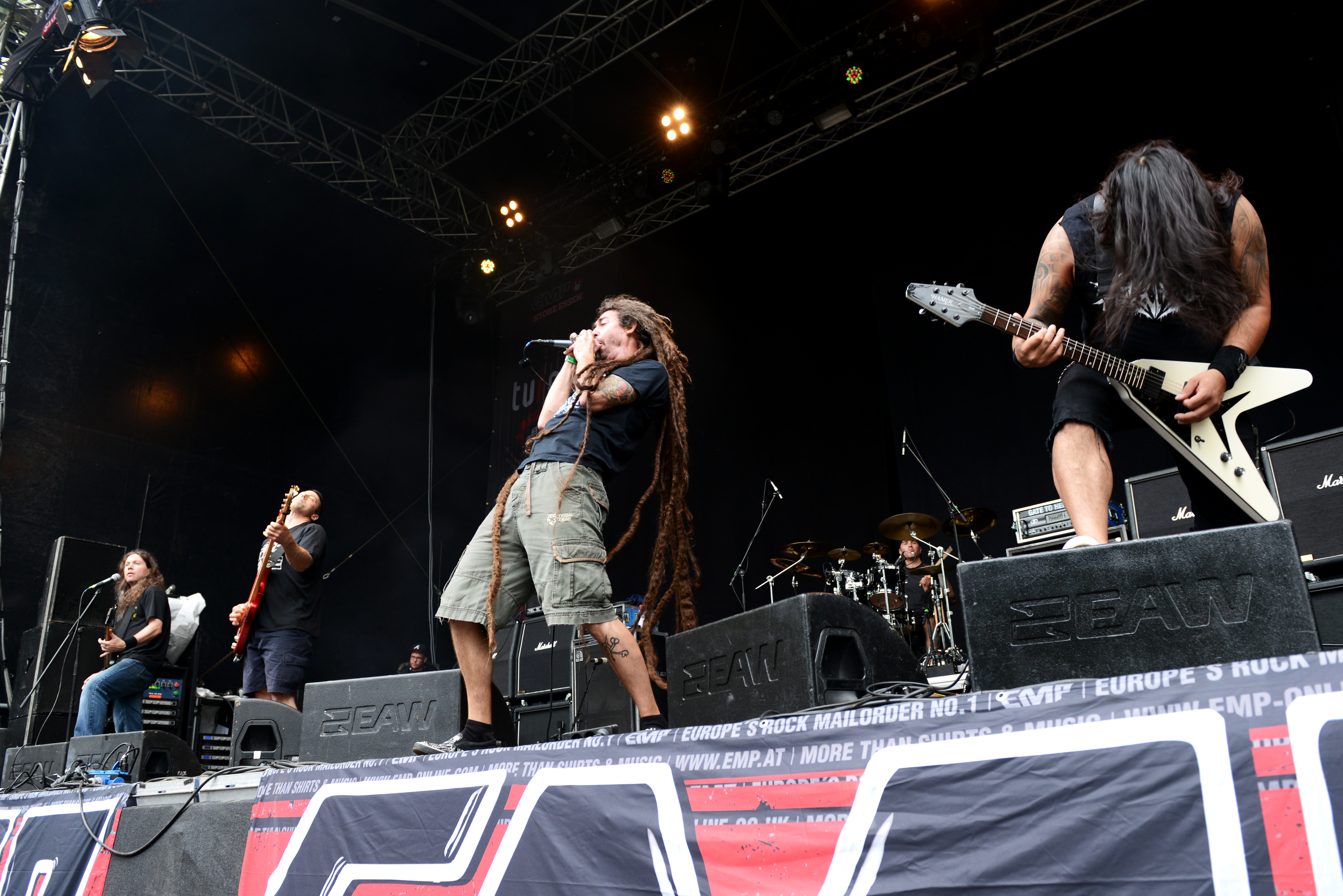
Shadows Fall performing live at Turock Open Air in Essen, Germany, 2014

Shadows Fall released its first DVD The Art of Touring in November 2005. The DVD included a live concert, backstage footage, and six music videos.

In December 10, 2005, Shadows Fall signed a deal with Atlantic Records.

The band released, titled Fallout from the War on June 13, 2006 through Century Media Records. Released as a compilation album, it debuted at number 83 on the Billboard 200. Fallout from the War included tracks recorded for The War Within that did not make it on to the album, B-sides, re-recordings, and cover songs. David Jeffries of AllMusic claimed the album is "a great informal introduction to the ferocious and melodic witches' brew Shadows Fall always seems to nail." They then headlined the Strhess tour once again with Poison the Well providing support.

During this time Shadows Fall were also invited to WWE headquarters to rework entrance theme song of WWE superstar Rob Van Dam, titled Fury of the Storm. Van Dam never used the song however it did appear on the WWE Wreckless Intent album. They also contributed to the God of War II Official Soundtrack with the song "Blood of Destiny.”

=== Threads of Life (2007–2008) ===
The band released its fifth studio album Threads of Life on April 3, 2007 through Atlantic Records and debuted at number 46 on the Billboard 200 selling 24,000 copies in its first week. "Redemption", the first single from the CD was released on February 20, 2007, through iTunes with an accompanying music video. "Redemption" received the band’s second Grammy Award nomination for Best Metal performance at 50th Annual Grammy Awards, but Slayer's "Final Six" won the award. The album received positive reviews, with Thom Jurek of AllMusic stating Shadows Fall has "lost none of the fire, attack or attitude" on Threads of Life. Jurek also said the album featured "killer guitar breaks, big fat chugging riffs, power-slam skin work, cattle prod bass, and cool little hooks and melodic touches on top of those bludgeoning riffs make Threads of Life a major label debut of merit, and a metal record worthy of celebrating." However prior to album’s release the band’s biggest supporters at Atlantic, including their A&R man, were laid off by the record company. Leading the band to not get much attention from the label afterwards. Atlantic then wanted the bands follow up release to be more commercial, but after they refused they were let go by the label.

Shadows Fall toured in support of Threads of Life, including making appearances at the Jägermeister tour with Stone Sour and Lacuna Coil, the Operation Annihilation tour with Static-X, 3 Inches of Blood and Divine Heresy, and the Black Crusade tour with Trivium, Machine Head, DragonForce, and Arch Enemy. On October 23, 2007, Shadows Fall released a greatest hits album titled Seeking the Way: The Greatest Hits. The band was a part of the Soundwave tour in Australia and in Asia in February 2008, along with Killswitch Engage, As I Lay Dying and Bleeding Through.

=== Retribution (2009–2011) ===
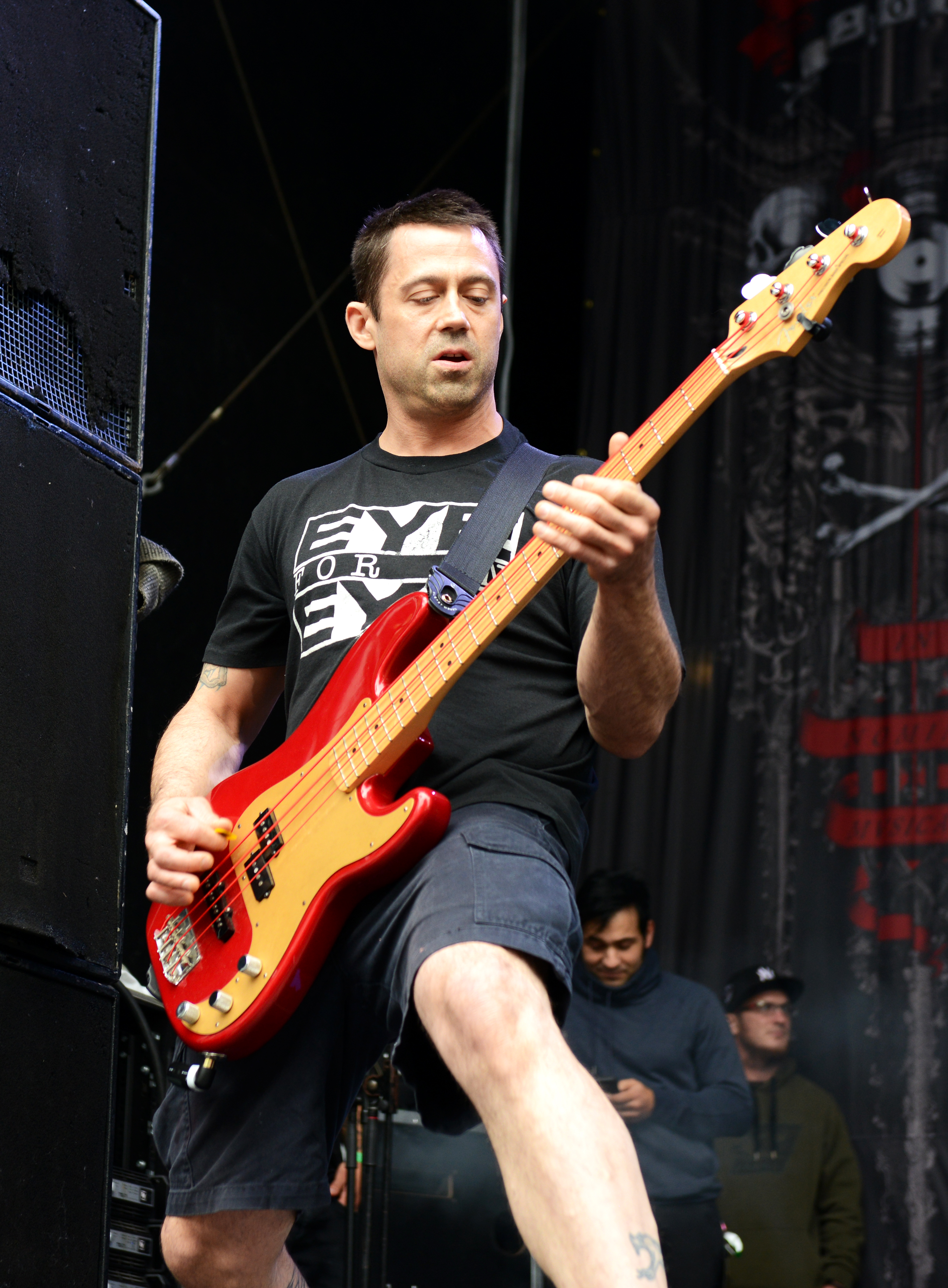
Bass player Paul Romanko in 2016

Shadows Fall performed their single "Still I Rise" on Late Night with Jimmy Fallon on September 3, 2009. Shadows Fall released their sixth studio album Retribution on September 15, 2009, through the band's own label, Everblack Industries, which was created in conjunction with Warner Music Group's ILG, Ferret Music and ChannelZERO Entertainment. It was released in the UK via Spinefarm Records. The album was produced by Chris "Zeuss" Harris. Drummer Jason Bittner stated about the band's new material, "The songs are a little more on the darker, angry side... lots of heaviness, lots of crazy guitar, and LOTS of room for me to have some fun. There is no doubt in my mind that this will be the best performance of my career, so far, and I owe that to my guys for bringing me incredible riffs to write killer drum parts to." The album debuted at number 34 on the Billboard 200 and 3 on the Hard Rock Charts. The album was met with positive reception; Greg Parto from AllMusic praised the guitar and stated “Shadows Fall have made quite the roaring return with Retribution.”

During the fall of 2009 the band was appearing on the 'Shock & Raw' tour of North America with 2Cents, Otep & Five Finger Death Punch. In February and March 2010, Shadows Fall embarked on their first headlining tour of Canada with Bison B.C. and Baptized in Blood serving as support. After a South American tour, Shadows Fall performed on the Jägermeister Stage in the 2010 Rockstar Mayhem Festival in July and August 2010, as well as supporting Lamb of God. During a show in Toronto, Canada on March 4, 2010 Testament guitarist Alex Skolnik joined the band on stage to perform their cover of "Bark at the Moon." Shadows Fall released a live CD/DVD, Madness in Manila: Shadows Fall Live in the Philippines 2009, on October 26.

=== Fire from the Sky, final tours and hiatus (2012–2020) ===
In late 2011, Shadows Fall entered the studio to begin recording their seventh studio album. While in the studio, they held live video streams to discuss the progress of the album and answer questions from fans. It was the first to be produced by Adam Dutkiewicz since the band's original studio release Somber Eyes to the Sky. Fire from the Sky was released on May 15, 2012 through Razor & Tie. Many of the lyrics touched upon the apocalypse, inspired by the end of the Mayan calendar in 2012. The album debuted at number 38 on the Billboard 200 and was met with positive reception. J. Andrew, writing for Metal Injection, said “this album probably has the best mix of vocal styles of any Shadows Fall release.” Revolver Magazine added “Fire From the Sky is suitably heavy, grim but not ridiculous, and its best songs will remind listeners of Metallica." In late 2012, the band headlined the Party To The Apocalypse 2012 tour with God Forbid starring Shadows Fall, God Forbid, Thy Will Be Done and Trumpet The Harlot. On January 11, 2013, it was announced that guitarist Jonathan Donais would be joining Anthrax on their upcoming Metal Alliance Tour. From late January to the middle of February of that year, Shadows Fall served as a supporting act on Hatebreed’s US tour, Felipe Rosa filled in for Donasis on guitar. On August 13, Donais was confirmed as a full Anthrax member. During the Fall of that year the band toured North America with Hatebreed once again along with The Acacia Strain.

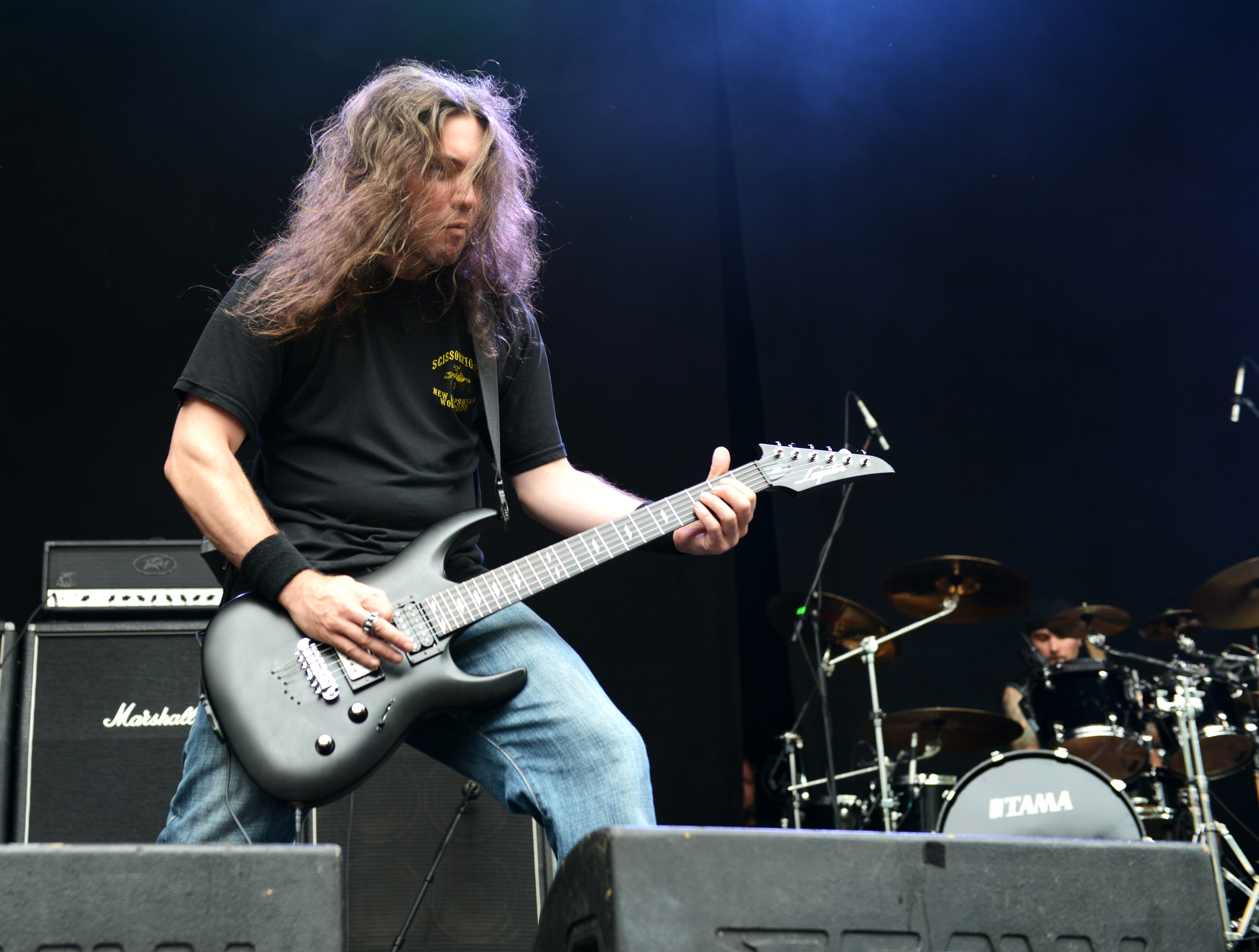
Matt Bachand, 2014

On June 28, 2014, Shadows Fall performed with the bands Black Fast, Dead by Wednesday, Hallow Point, and Gray's Divide in St. Louis, Missouri. On August 25, the band announced several final tours to take place in Europe and North America so the band could take a hiatus from future extensive touring. This farewell tour lasted into the summer of 2015. In December 2014, it was announced drummer Jason Bittner would join Arizona thrash metal band Flotsam and Jetsam, and he is currently the drummer for Overkill. Guitarist Matt Bachand left to join Act of Defiance, along with the former members of Megadeth. During the bands hiatus Matt Bachand played guitar for the American metal band Living Wreckage with former Shadows Fall guitarist Jon Donais.

When asked about the bands hiatus in a 2024 interview Fair stated:

I think we really stopped touring because we’d just been on such a grind for close to 20 years on the road, and we were road warriors. We were out there all the time and we just got physically and mentally a little bit burnt out. Our guys were getting amazing opportunities, like Jon [Donias] had an opportunity to join Anthrax and Jason [Bittner] was playing with a bunch of other bands and now ended up in Overkill – New Jersey represent. Then we just kind of knew it was time to take a break.

=== Reunion (2021–present) ===
In a May 2021 interview on the Who's Your Band? music podcast, drummer Jason Bittner revealed that Shadows Fall had "tried to get together last year for a reunion", and they were planning to play one of their first shows in over half a decade at the Worcester Palladium. He also commented on the possibility of new material and further band activity: "We're not gonna say we're still gonna be on hiatus, but we're not gonna say we're active either. We wanna just try to play a show. That's the point of right now [...] We've already talked about this — we said, if anything, we would write an EP first. We wouldn't write a full-length; we'd probably just four-song increments or something."

On June 22, 2021, Brian Fair confirmed that Shadows Fall were reuniting for their first show in over half a decade at the Worcester Palladium on December 18. Supporting acts for this show were Unearth, Darkest Hour, Within the Ruins, Sworn Enemy and Carnivora. In December 2021, when asked by the Podioslave Podcast if there will be new music from Shadows Fall, Fair said the band had talked about it, but they had not written any new material. They wanted to focus on their reunion show and issues with Fair's neck. In 2022 Shadows Fall made sporadic festival appearances.

In 2023, they played a couple of festivals, including a set at the New England Metal & Hardcore Festival which hadn’t been held the previous 5 years. That same year Brain Fair stated in an interview with Blabbermouth.net that the band was working on new material.

On March 16, 2024, the band played the first of two special one-off show in New Jersey in celebration of their album The War Within 20th anniversary. They then played an additional anniversary show at the Worcester Palladium in December. On December 6, 2024, the band released a new single titled "In The Grey." In May 2025, they released another new single “Souls Devoured” and supported Killswitch Engage on a short tour in May. Later that same year, the band was honored by Springfield Mayor Domenic Sarno, who declared July 18, 2025 "Shadows Fall Day". The proclamation ceremony took place before the band’s set at the MassMutual Center, where they opened for Lamb of God. During their set, Brian Fair held up the proclamation during their show, thanking the community for the recognition. In August of that same year, the band started recording the back end of their new album with drummer Jason Bittner, stating they are hoping to get it done by the end of the year.

In of February 2026 Bittner provided a new update in an interview with Laughingmonkeymusic claiming the album will be released sometime in 2026. Shadows Fall played their 30th anniversary hometown show on July 18, at the MGM Aria Ballroom in Springfield, Massachusetts. Unearth and Within the Ruins will serve as the supporting acts. On August 1, the band announced they had finished recording their 8th album.

== Musical style and influences ==
Shadows Fall has been described as metalcore, melodic death metal and thrash metal. Their songs often alternate between heavier, aggressive passages, and more melodic or slower interludes, using both harsh and clean/melodic vocals.

Tom Murphy of Westword opines that "Shadows Fall began as a melodic death-metal band with some roots in hardcore", and noted that on the 2002 album The Art of Balance, the band started to incorporate thrash metal into their sound.

Some of Shadows Fall's lyrics touch upon internal struggle, spirituality, politics and personal topics. Lead singer Brian Fair stated his lyrical influence comes from “life experience and a cumulative of acquiring knowledge through different readings and philosophy.” Fair has also often stated that the music (riffs, tempo, style) sets the vibe that lets lyrics go in a certain direction. For example, on Fire From the Sky, he mentions the music had an eerie dark vibe, so the lyrics followed. They have cited Carcass, Testament, seventies-Aerosmith, Integrity and Cro-Mags as some of their inspirations. In a 2024 interview, Fair stated:

The cool thing with Shadows Fall is we would share a lot of influences, but everyone was really eclectic in what they listened to individually, so we’d start from a bedrock of that kind of sound, but everyone was bringing in weird ideas out of nowhere. Like I would know a lyric was fully influenced by The Smiths, but you never would hear it in the song, but I knew where it came from.

As for individual influences Jonathan Donais has cited guitarists Zakk Wylde (Black Label Society) and Dimebag Darrell. Matt Bachand has cited Metallica and Slayer as influences. Drummer Jason Bittner is also influenced by heavy metal acts like Anthrax, Megadeth, Iron Maiden, and Judas Priest.

== Legacy ==
Shadows Fall has been credited as a cornerstone/staple of the new wave of American heavy metal, having been referred to as one of "big four" bands of the movement, along with Killswitch Engage, Lamb of God and Unearth. The group also played a big part in the metalcore/melodic metalcore genres and have been dubbed as one of the genre’s pioneers by publications such as Loudwire and Revolver. Their 2004 album The War Within is viewed as a prominent album in the genre and help boost the metalcore in prominence went it reached number 20 on the Billboard 200. Punknews stated “with this album Shadows Fall has bulldozed the door to allow other bands like Killswitch, Unearth, Lamb of God, etc reach new heights.” Rise to Remain, All That Remains and Darkest Hour have cited the band as an influence. In 2007, Hit Parader dubbed Shadows Fall the 10th greatest American band of the 21st century.

In 2025, Zahra Huselid of Screen Rant included the band in the site's list of "10 Best Thrash Metal Bands Who Weren't The Big Four".

== Band members ==
=== Current members ===
- Jonathan Donais – lead guitar, backing vocals (1996–2015, 2021–present)
- Matt Bachand – rhythm guitar, clean vocals (1996–2015, 2021–present)
- Paul Romanko – bass (1997–2015, 2021–present)
- Brian Fair – lead vocals (1999–2015, 2021–present)
- Jason Bittner – drums (2001–2015, 2021–present)

=== Former members ===
- David Germain – drums (1996–2000)
- Mark Laliberte – bass (1996–1997)
- Damien McPherson – lead vocals (1996)
- Philip Labonte – lead vocals (1997–1999)
- Derek Kerswill – drums (2000–2001)

=== Touring members ===
- Adam Dutkiewicz – drums (1996)
- Ed Lanouette – bass (2012)
- Willis Mathiasen – drums (2012)
- Mike Turbayne – bass (2013–2014)
- Felipe Roa – lead guitar (2013–2014)

== Awards and nominations ==
Grammy Awards

Year	Nominee / work	Award	Result
2006	"What Drives the Weak"	Best Metal Performance	Nominated
2008	"Redemption"	Best Metal Performance	Nominated

Metalstorm Awards

Year	Nominee / work	Award	Result
2009	Retribution	Best Metalcore Album	Nominated

Boston Music Awards

Year	Nominee / work	Award	Result
2004	Shadows Fall	Hard Rock Band of the Year	Nominated
2006	Shadows Fall	Hard Rock Band of the Year	Nominated
2007	Shadows Fall	Outstanding Metal/Hardcore Band of the Year	Nominated
2007	Shadows Fall	Act of the Year	Nominated
2007	Threads of Life	Album of the Year (Major)	Nominated

Modern Drummer Awards

Year	Nominee / work	Award	Result
2004	Jason Bittner	Best Up and Coming Drummer	Won
2005	Jason Bittner	Best Metal Drummer	Won
2005	Jason Bittner on The War Within	Best Recorded Performance	Won
2006	Jason Bittner	Best Metal Drummer	Won

Guitar World Awards

Year	Nominee / work	Award	Result
2004	Jon Donais & Matt Backhand	Best New Talent	Won

Metal Hammer Golden Gods Awards

Year	Nominee / work	Award	Result
2003	Shadows Fall	Best Underground Act	Won

Revolver Readers poll

Year	Nominee / work	Award	Result
2003	Shadows Fall	Best New Talent	Won

Other honors

- In 2004, Jon Donais & Matt Backhand were both named to Guitar Worlds list of the 100 Greatest Guitarist of All Time.
- July 18, 2025, was declared "Shadows Fall Day" in Springfield, Massachusetts.

== Discography ==
=== Studio albums ===
Title	Album details	Peak chart positions					Sales
Title	Album details	US	US Indie	US Hard Rock	JPN	UK	Sales
Somber Eyes to the Sky	Released: November 30, 1997; Label: Lifeless, Genet; Format: CD, LP, digital download	—	—	—	—	—	
Of One Blood	Released: April 4, 2000; Label: Century Media; Format: CD, LP, digital download	—	—	—	—	—	
The Art of Balance	Released: September 17, 2002; Label: Century Media; Format: CD, CD+DVD, LP, digital download	—	15	—	—	—	US: 100,000+
The War Within	Released: September 21, 2004; Label: Century Media; Format: CD, CD+DVD, LP, digital download	20	1	—	205	—	US: 200,000+
Threads of Life	Released: April 3, 2007; Label: Atlantic, Roadrunner; Format: CD, LP, digital download	46	—	—	95	192	US: 93,000+
Retribution	Released: September 15, 2009; Label: Everblack Industries; Format: CD, CD+DVD, LP, digital download	35	4	3	160	—	
Fire from the Sky	Released: May 15, 2012; Label: Razor & Tie; Format: CD, CD+DVD, digital download	38	10	4	—	—	
"—" denotes a recording that did not chart or was not released in that territory.

=== Demos ===
Title	Album details
Mourning a Dead World	Released: November 1996; Label: Independent
Eternal / Somber Angel	Released: 1997; Label: Independent

=== Compilation albums ===
Title	Album details	Peak chart positions		Sales
Title	Album details	US	US Indie	Sales
Fear Will Drag You Down	Released: January 28, 2002; Label: Century Media; Format: CD, digital download	—	—	
Fallout from the War	Released: June 13, 2006; Label: Century Media; Format: CD, digital download	83	5	US: 13,000+
Seeking the Way: The Greatest Hits	Released: October 23, 2007; Label: Century Media; Format: CD, digital download	—	—	
"—" denotes a recording that did not chart or was not released in that territory.

=== Video albums ===
Title	Album details	Sales
The Art of Touring	Released: November 15, 2005; Label: Century Media; Format: DVD	US: 3,000+
Madness in Manila: Shadows Fall Live in the Philippines 2009	Released: October 26, 2010; Label: Everblack Industries; Format: CD+DVD, digital download	

=== Singles ===
Year	Title	US Main.	Album
2002	"Stepping Outside the Circle"/"Thoughts Without Words"	—	The Art of Balance
2003	"Destroyer of Senses"	—	The Art of Balance
2004	"What Drives the Weak"	38	The War Within
2005	"Inspiration on Demand"	33	The War Within
2005	"Enlightened by the Cold"	—	The War Within
2007	"Redemption"	37	Threads of Life
2007	"Another Hero Lost"	40	Threads of Life
2009	"Still I Rise"	—	Retribution
2010	"Bark at the Moon"	—	Retribution
2012	"The Unknown"	—	Fire from the Sky
2024	"In the Grey"	—	Non-album singles
2025	"Souls Devoured"	—	Non-album singles

=== Music videos ===
Year	Title	Director
2002	"Thoughts Without Words"	
2002	"Destroyer of Senses"	
2002	"The Idiot Box"	
2004	"The Power of I and I"	Dale Resteghini
2004	"What Drives the Weak"	Zach Merck
2004	"Inspiration on Demand"	
2005	"Enlightened by the Cold"	Zach Merck
2006	"In Effigy"	Zach Merck
2007	"Redemption"	Zach Merck
2007	"Burning the Lives"	
2007	"Another Hero Lost"	
2008	"Forevermore"	
2009	"Still I Rise"	Zack Merck
2010	"Bark at the Moon"	David Brodsky
2012	"The Unknown"	
2024	"In the Grey"	Chris Klumpp
2025	"Souls Devoured"	Chris Klumpp
