= Derek Kerswill =

American musician (born 1973)

- Born: Derek M. Kerswill; April 5, 1973 (age 53); Wilmington, Delaware, United States
- Genres: Hard rock Heavy metal metalcore sludge metal thrash metal
- Occupations: Drummer, record producer, artist
- Instruments: Drums & percussion, guitar, bass
- Years active: 1990–present
- Labels: Equal Vision Records, Relapse Records, Metal Blade Records
- Website: MySpace page

Derek M. Kerswill (born April 5, 1973) is an American musician best known for his drumming in the bands Unearth, Seemless, Kingdom of Sorrow, and multiple fill-ins/studio projects. While no longer on the road, he continues to play in several bands in the greater Boston area.

== Biography ==
Derek has been playing drums since the age of 9. He is completely self-taught and also writes music on guitar and bass for his band Seemless.

His resume boasts some of metals top visionaries, including most recently, Massachusetts based metal outfit Unearth and underground sludge-core super group Kingdom of Sorrow. Kingdom of Sorrow's debut album was released in February 2008, debuting at #131 on Billboard Top 200. He has also spent time in Shadows Fall, Icepick, and a host of studio work that has demonstrated his diverse playing, while always maintaining a style all his own. He has also coined the term "Brutal Groove", which best describes his style. He was also officially named as Unearth's new drummer. Most recently, his project Seemless has disbanded, but the surprisingly atmospheric and pop-sensible T A N G E N T S has surfaced as his new project, with longtime friend and song writing collaborator Dave Witham.

In late 2010, Derek announced his departure from Unearth and immediately toured with The Ghost Inside on their "Returners" 25 date European tour. Another new project with Matt Bachand and Jon Donais of Shadows Fall fame has surfaced in the form of a heavy and 80's influenced rock/metal band called Dead of Night.

In late 2014, a new supergroup featuring Derek & Brian Fair of Shadows Fall surfaced in the form of Downpour and rumors have been flying through the metal industry for months claiming they have an entire record finished and they are just waiting for the "right label" before releasing.

== Equipment ==
Derek Kerswill uses USA Custom, New Classic, and Renown Maple Gretsch drums, a variety of snare drums, and Gibraltar Hardware. He also uses and endorses Aquarian drumheads, Vater drumsticks (he uses X-Treme Designs "Punisher" and "Warrior"), XL Specialty Cases and Meinl cymbals.

=== Tour kit ca. 2008-2009 ===
- Gretsch Drums & Meinl Cymbals:
- Drums - New Classic Maple in Deep Cherry Gloss
  - 10x8" Tom
  - 12x9" Tom
  - 13x10" Tom
  - 14x14" Floor Tom
  - 16x16" Floor Tom
  - 22x18" Bass Drum
  - 14x6.5" Gretsch Banged Brass Snare
  - Cymbals – Meinl
  - 14" Mb20 Heavy Soundwave Hi-Hats
  - 22" Mb20 Heavy Ride
  - 18" Byzance Traditional Medium Crash
  - 19" Mb20 Heavy Crash
  - 20" Mb20 Heavy Crash
  - 20" Byzance Traditional China

== Discography ==
- Downpour - “s/t” (2018)
- The V - "Now or Never" (2015)
- Christa Alberts - "My Song" (2011)
- T A N G E N T S - "One Little Light Year" (2010)
- Sonia V. - "Oh Sweet Tragedy - anthems from the ashes" (2009)
- Unearth - "The March" (2008)
- Kingdom of Sorrow - "Kingdom of Sorrow" (2008)
- Garuda - "Garuda" (2008)
- Unearth - "Alive From The Apocalypse" DVD (2008)
- Shadows Fall - Seeking The Way: The Greatest Hits
- Seemless - "What Have We Become" (2006)
- Icepick - "Violent Epiphany" (2006)
- Seemless - "Seemless" (2005)
- Stryper - "Reborn" (2005)
- Robby Roadsteamer - "Okay Computer" (2004)
- New Idea Society - "You Are Awake Or Asleep" (2004)
- Twelfth Of Never - "Things That Were" (2003)
- Shadows Fall - "Fear Will Drag You Down" European & Australian release
- Medium - "Terra Firma" (2002)
- The Rise Park - "The Rise Park" (2001)
- Long Distance Runner - "s/t" (1999)
- Scattered Remnants - "Destined To Fail" (1997)

== Guest appearances ==
- Unearth - "Live From The Apocalypse" DVD (2008)
