= The Art of Balance =

Studio album by Shadows Fall
- Released: September 17, 2002
- Recorded: 2002
- Studios: Planet Z Studios (Hadley, Massachusetts)
- Genres: Metalcore; thrash metal
- Length: 47:22
- Label: Century Media
- Producer: Chris "Zeuss" Harris

Shadows Fall chronology
Of One Blood (2000)	The Art of Balance (2002)	The War Within (2004)

Singles from The Art of Balance
- 1. "Stepping Outside the Circle" / "Thoughts Without Words" Released: August 2002; 2. "Destroyer of Senses" Released: 2003

Alternative cover

Professional ratings
Review scores
Source	Rating
AllMusic	4/5 stars
Chronicles of Chaos	(9/10)
Punknews.org	5/5 stars

The Art of Balance is the third album by American heavy metal band Shadows Fall, released on September 17, 2002. The album sold over 4,500 copies the week of its release, and debuted at position 15 on the Top Independent Albums chart. With this release being the first with Jason Bittner, the lineup was solidified onwards as it is today's current members and the longest lineup in Shadows Fall's career's history.

== Background ==
The Art of Balance was the first studio album by the band to which the entire lineup contributed, meaning that no songs were re-recorded from older material (except for "Stepping Outside the Circle", which originally appeared on the EP Deadworld). Matthew Bachand explained that this unity created a better band and that, "this time, instead of eight Gothenburg death metal songs, we have ballads, rock songs, thrash tunes."

"Thoughts Without Words" was the album's first music video, featuring a simple band performance. The follow-up, "Destroyer of Senses," had the group performing in a snowed-in building and drinking with friends. "The Idiot Box" served as the basis for a final video, featuring the group's performance and backstage antics. All three videos saw significant airplay on MTV2 and Fuse TV.

== Lyrical themes ==
Thematically, the album was inspired by the quest to find a perfect "balance" between melody and aggression. Lyrically, the album revolves around the fight against spiritually destructive forces. The song "Thoughts Without Words" was influenced by Chinese Buddhism and refers to the moment where, through meditation, a person's inspiration and expression become united.

The concept behind the album, as explained by Brian Fair: "It's the idea of oneness and unity between all people and all things. It's the idea that all systems begin from the same spark and it's something we get further away from. We're all in this together." Fair also explained that he came up with the title for the record, and it represents the "balance of melody and aggression," and the "process of trying to find that balance between the two."

The song "Thoughts Without Words" is "based around meditation and yoga," and on "trying to be able to calm the mind and experience things without constantly thinking them." In other words, being lost in the moment. "Destroyer of Senses" is about Fair's father's battle with alcoholism. Alcohol, or even certain experiences, can make one feel more alive ('Giver of life'), but at the same time affect the senses ('Destroyer of senses').

== Track listing ==
All lyrics are written by Brian Fair; all music is composed by Shadows Fall, except "Welcome to the Machine," written and composed by Roger Waters.

No.	Title	Length
1.	"Idle Hands"	3:34
2.	"Thoughts Without Words"	4:31
3.	"Destroyer of Senses"	2:54
4.	"Casting Shade" (instrumental)	2:09
5.	"Stepping Outside the Circle"	5:25
6.	"The Art of Balance"	4:46
7.	"Mystery of One Spirit"	5:10
8.	"The Idiot Box"	4:30
9.	"Prelude to Disaster" (instrumental)	1:48
10.	"A Fire in Babylon"	7:30
11.	"Welcome to the Machine" (Pink Floyd cover)	5:05
Total length:		47:22

Special Edition Bonus CD-ROM
No.	Title	Length
1.	"Video Interview"
2.	"Destroyer of Senses" (Live at Club Chrome 5/31/02 and CBGB's 6/3/02)
3.	"Thoughts Without Words" (Live at Club Chrome 5/31/02 and CBGB's 6/3/02)
4.	"Of One Blood" (Live bootleg; recorded at Club Cyclone in Tokyo, Japan 2001)

== Personnel ==
=== Shadows Fall ===
- Brian Fair – lead vocals
- Jon Donais – lead guitar, backing vocals
- Matt Bachand – rhythm guitar, clean vocals
- Paul Romanko – bass
- Jason Bittner – drums (1–10)

=== Additional credits ===
- Produced, engineered, and mixed by Zeuss
- Mastered by Alan Douches at West West Side Music in Tenafly, New Jersey
- Art design and layout by Miked
- Group photos by Justin Borucki
- Live photo by Rev. Aaron Pepelis
- Jim Weeks – drums and co-production on "Welcome to the Machine"
- Dan Egan and Chris Bartlett – gang vocals on "Stepping Outside the Circle" and "Destroyer of Senses"
