= The War Within (Shadows Fall album) =

Studio album by Shadows Fall
- Released: September 21, 2004
- Recorded: April–May 2004
- Studio: Planet Z Studios (Hadley, Massachusetts)
- Genres: Metalcore, thrash metal
- Length: 42:21
- Label: Century Media
- Producers: Chris "Zeuss" Harris, Shadows Fall

Shadows Fall chronology
The Art of Balance (2002)	The War Within (2004)	Fallout from the War (2006)

Singles from The War Within
- 1. "What Drives the Weak" Released: March 22, 2005; 2. "Inspiration on Demand" Released: June 4, 2005

The War Within is the fourth studio album by American heavy metal band Shadows Fall. The album has sold over 300,000 copies worldwide. The War Within is the band's best selling album, and in 2005 made sales history on Century Media Records when it became the label's best selling album of all time. To date, the album retains this status. The album was also issued as a limited edition digipak with an exclusive bonus DVD that featured bootleg concert footage along with drum and guitar lessons from members of the band. The album debuted at number 20 on the Billboard 200 during its release.

== Background ==
In a 2023 interview the band's lead singer Brian Fair described The War Within as a selfish record stating:

We threw everything we wanted to do at the wall. It wasn’t like we had toned down what we did, if anything we stepped it all up a notch. There was more shredding guitar, there was more double bass, there was more screaming and singing; we really touched on all our influences in a very non-commercial way.

The album's name was inspired by Fairs’s internal struggles that he was going through at the time as the band started gaining popularity. As he tried to balance staying a philosophical writer who also wanted to party and have success. He stated "The War Within was about really trying to come to terms with a lot of these ideas and thoughts and emotions I was going through."

the album was produced by Zeuss at Planet Z Studios in the band's home state of Massachusetts.

Guitarist Matt Bachand later stated that the band were very busy touring during the process of creating the album. Much of the writing process took place while they were on the road or whenever they had any down time.

== Lyrical themes ==
The following is a quote from Tom Bejgrowicz, who worked closely with Brian Fair on the overarching themes and concepts portrayed by the album. He also designed the album artwork.

The idea for The War Within turned to one man – any man, mind you – and the chaos and beauty that surrounds each of us here on earth. Birth, death, love, hate, riots, pollution, power, religion, nature, corruption of the mind, the soul, and so on. By simply living, we are open and susceptible to them all – to confront each of them, from within.

In a separate interview Fair commented on the lyrics stating:

The War Within was way more introspective, I think I was reading a lot of Tom Robbins at the time, and I was reading some [Charles] Bukowski and just darker, inner turmoil kind of writers. You could tell that I was also trying to sort through my own thoughts as the band was getting bigger, and I was trying to balance this idea of being a philosophical writer who also wanted to party and have success, so it was sort of balancing all those things.

The track "Those Who Cannot Speak" is dedicated to Brian Fair's autistic niece and nephew. Fair explained in an interview:

It's something I've dealt with my niece and nephew who've had different forms and mild learning disabilities when it comes to speech – associating objects with language and things like that. And I also read a lot of Faulkner and he always seemed to have characters that kinda had that amazing poetry in their internal monologue but couldn't speak. And that always intrigued me.

== Release and promotion ==
On June 2, 2004 Century Media announced the album's release date September 21, 2004, along with the full track listing. The album sold 39,250 copies in its first week, it debuted at number 20 on the Billboard 200 and topped the US Top Independent Albums chart. By June of 2005 the album had gone on to sell over 200,000 copies which was an unprecedented number of sales for an album on independent label. It also became the highest selling record on Century Media Records.

Both of the album's singles "What Drives the Week" and "Inspiration on Demand" went on to reach the top 40 of the US Mainstream Rock chart. Music videos were created for both songs along with an additional one for the song "The Power of I and I." The video for "Inspiration on Demand" in particular received significant play time on Fuse, MTV2 and MTVU.

The band embarked on The War Within Tour in support of the album. They also took part in a US arena and European tour with Slipknot in May and June of 2005. During the Summer of that year they performed on the main stage at Ozzfest, which made them the first New Wave of American Heavy Metal band to achieve the honor, and one of the few bands in history to make the jump from the second stage to the main stage.

== Critical reception ==
Professional ratings
Review scores
Source	Rating
AllMusic	3/5 stars
Chronicles of Chaos	8/10 stars
Lambgoat	4/5 stars
Revolver	5/5 stars
Rolling Stone	3/5 stars
Rock Hard	8.5/10
Punk News	4.5/5 stars
Ultimate Guitar	10/10
Metal.de	8/10

The War Within received positive reception on its initial release. The album debuted at position no. 20 on the Billboard 200 — the band's highest-charting album. Wade Kergan of AllMusic noted that the album had "more in common now with the classic thrash of Metallica than the metal-tinged hardcore of Coalesce." Michael Gluck of Lambgoat commented that the album "delivers itself with a fury and honoring of eighties metal guitar and vocal harmonies." Punk News claimed the album is “A must own for anyone that likes the slightest bit of metal.” Also adding “with this album, Shadows Fall has bulldozed the door to allow other bands like Killswitch, Unearth, Lamb of God, etc reach new heights. Ultimate Guitar gave the album a 10/10 stating “the guitar work is insanely good. Everything is strong on this album.” All the chemicals and ingredients that make up a good metal album are on here. The album is often considered a considered a cornerstone of the metalcore genre and In 2005, the album was ranked number 370 in Rock Hard magazine's book The 500 Greatest Rock & Metal Albums of All Time.

The song "What Drives the Weak" received a Grammy Award nomination for the 48th Annual Grammy Awards Best Metal Performance in 2006, however the award went to Slipknot for the song "Before I Forget." In a 2009 MetalSucks feature titled "21 Best Metal Albums of the 21st Century... So Far", the album was listed as number 20 based on poll data from professionals in the metal industry. The editors wrote, "The Art of Balance, their third album, was solid, but The War Within was where they really hit their stride. The dual guitars of Donais and Bachand spotlighted great solos and dual harmonies that could be appreciated by both Anthrax fans and pentatonic sweep enthusiasts." Dread Music reviews stated “The War Within” wasn’t just an album; it was a seismic shift in the landscape of metalcore.” In 2020 it was voted the 11th greatest metalcore album of all time of Ultimate Guitar.

In 2005 drummer Jason Bittner won Best Recorded Performance for his work on the album at that years Modern Drummer Awards. The War Within was also nominated in the best album category at the 2005 Metal Hammer Golden Gods Awards. In 2014 Loudwire ranked The War Within the 6th best metal album of 2004.

== Legacy ==
The album is often cited as a landmark in the Metalcore genre. In a 2023 interview the band's lead singer Brian Fair reflected on the album stating "This record changed my entire life and took me around the world. We had been surprised by the success of The Art Of Balance and definitely felt a little pressure to take things to another level, but we did not allow that pressure to change our vision of the band we wanted to be. Our goal was to allow all of our influences shine through while pushing metal into a new direction, creating the music we had always wanted to hear ourselves." "The War Within may be the closest we have come to achieving these goals and that hard work and vision allowed us to get on our first arena tour, our first Grammy nomination, and countless other firsts along the way.”

In 2024 the band played two separate concerts in celebration of the album's 20th anniversary one in New Jersey on March 16, and a second one at the Worcester Palladium in December. During both concerts they played the album in its entirety.

== Track listing ==
All lyrics are written by Brian Fair; all music is composed by Shadows Fall.

No.	Title	Length
1.	"The Light That Blinds"	4:58
2.	"Enlightened by the Cold"	3:02
3.	"Act of Contrition"	3:41
4.	"What Drives the Weak"	4:44
5.	"Stillness"	4:52
6.	"Inspiration on Demand"	3:52
7.	"The Power of I and I"	3:34
8.	"Ghosts of Past Failures"	4:13
9.	"Eternity Is Within"	4:08
10.	"Those Who Cannot Speak"	5:17
Total length:		42:21

Japanese edition bonus track
No.	Title	Length
11.	"Teasn', Pleasn'" (Dangerous Toys cover)	3:14

Limited edition bonus DVD
No.	Title	Length
1.	"Stepping Outside the Circle" (bootleg fan footage compiled and edited by Zach Merck)
2.	"Of One Blood" (live bootleg)
3.	"A Fire in Babylon" (live bootleg)
4.	"Guitar Lesson 1" (with Jon Donais & Matt Bachand)
5.	"Guitar Lesson 2" (with Jon Donais & Matt Bachand)
6.	"Drum Lesson" (with Jason Bittner)

== Personnel ==
Shadows Fall

- Brian Fair – lead vocals
- Jonathan Donais – lead guitar, backing vocals
- Matt Bachand – rhythm guitar, clean vocals
- Paul Romanko – bass
- Jason Bittner – drums

Production

- Produced, engineered, and mixed by Zeuss and Shadows Fall
- Digital editing by Rob Gil
- Mastered by Alan Douches
- Cover art, art direction, design, and layout by Tom Bejgrowicz
- Photography and digital manipulation by Justin Borucki
- "SF" logo by Don Naylor
- Themes and concepts by Brian Fair and Tom Bejgrowicz
Additional performers
- Admiral Anger and the Gang Bang BBQ Crew – backing vocals
DVD credits
- Produced by Zach Merck
- DVD compilation by Rob Avery
- "Stepping Outside the Circle" bootleg fan footage compiled and edited by Zach Merck
- "Of One Blood" and "A Fire in Babylon" bootleg video produced by Denise Korycki
- Guitar lessons by Nick Bowcott, produced by Guitar World
- Drum lesson filmed by Mike Maney and Derek Bittner, produced and edited by Mike Maney, executive produced by Jason Bittner

== Song usage ==
- The song "What Drives the Weak" was used as a track on the Projekt Revolution sampler CD given to members of the Linkin Park Underground. It is also featured on MTV2 Headbangers Ball Volume 2.
- The cover "Teasn' Pleasn'" by Dangerous Toys on the Japanese edition of the album was subsequently released on the compilation album Fallout from the War.
- "The Light That Blinds" is featured as a bonus track on Guitar Hero II.
- "What Drives the Weak" and "The Power of I and I" are featured on the Final Fight: Streetwise soundtrack.
- "The Power of I and I" is featured on the UFC Ultimate Beatdowns Vol. 1 compilation CD.

== Chart positions ==
Album

Chart (2004)	Peak position
The Billboard 200	20
Top Independent Albums	1
Japanese Albums Chart	205

Singles

Year	Single	Chart	Position
2005	"What Drives the Weak"	Mainstream Rock Tracks	38
2005	"Inspiration on Demand"	Mainstream Rock Tracks	33
