= Matt Bachand =

American metal guitarist

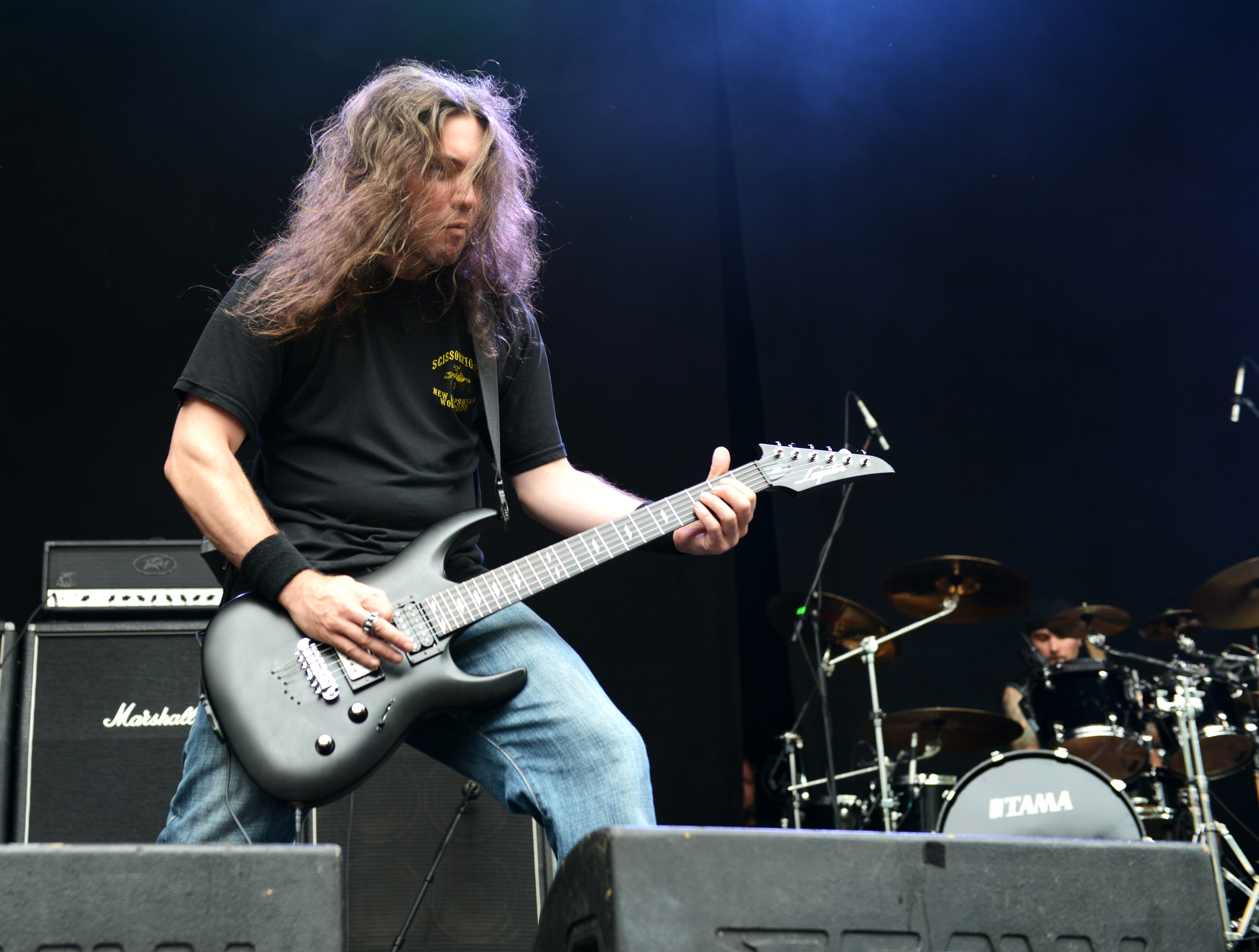
- Matt Bachand at Turock Open Air in Essen, Germany, 2014

Background information
- Born: Matthew Ryan Bachand; April 29, 1977 (age 49)
- Origin: Easthampton, Massachusetts; United States
- Genres: Heavy metal; death metal; metalcore; thrash metal; melodic death metal
- Occupation: Guitarist
- Instruments: Guitar, bass, vocals
- Years active: 1995–present
- Labels: Century Media, Atlantic, Roadrunner

Matthew Ryan Bachand (born April 29, 1977) is an American guitarist. He has strong death metal and thrash metal influences. He is the rhythm guitarist and backing vocalist for the metalcore band Shadows Fall and the bassist for Act of Defiance. In some Shadows Fall CD booklets (particularly in Threads of Life), he is nicknamed Matt "Funnily" Bachand.

== Biography ==
=== Early years ===
Bachand is known for his deep growls or death growl, which is often heard in death metal genre. In Shadows Fall, he can also be heard using a clean vocal style, such as in the song "What Drives the Weak."

In his earlier days around the early through the mid-1990s, he was a guitarist for the death metal band Exhumed (not the deathgrind band Exhumed) and briefly was part of another death metal band, Perpetual Doom.

He also played guitar and sang in a band called Empty, who released an 11-song CD, Before the Sunrise, through Wilderness Records in 1996. The band's music is not heavy metal, and features Bachardt and Jeff Kukucka's harmonizing vocals and playing acoustic guitars throughout.

=== Shadows fall ===
Bachand and Jon Donais formed Shadows Fall in late 1995. Their first album ,Somber Eyes to the Sky, was released in 1997 through Bachand's self-produced label Lifeless Records. Shadows Fall would become one of the cornerstones of the new wave of American heavy metal, considered one of its driving forces. In 2000 they released Of One Blood. Two years later, they caught their first break when they released The Art of Balance, which sold over 100,000 copies.

Bachand and the band achieved more success with their 2004 followup album The War Within, which led to the group's first Grammy nomination for best metal performance. Individually, Bachand and his bandmate Donais were voted best Best New Talent in the 2004 Guitar World readers poll. That same year, the duo were also named to Guitar World's list of the 100 best guitar players of all time.

Bachand and Shadows Fall released four more albums between 2006 and 2012, earning another Grammy nomination in 2008 for their song “Redemption". However, on August 25, 2014, the band announced several final tours to take place in Europe and North America so they could take a hiatus from extensive touring. This farewell tour lasted into the summer of 2015.

On June 22, 2021, lead singer Brian Fair confirmed that Shadows Fall were reuniting for their first show in over half a decade at the Worcester Palladium on December 18. After playing a couple of live shows, Bachand and the band released new material for the first time in 12 years on December 6, 2024, a single titled "In the Grey."

=== Act of Defiance ===
During Shadows Fall's hiatus, Bachand joined Act of Defiance, which features former Megadeth members Chris Broderick and Shawn Drover and vocalist Henry Derek Bonner. He recorded two albums with them that were released in 2015 and 2017.

=== Living wreckage ===
Bachand is also a member of supergroup Living Wreckage, which features vocalist Jeff Gard (Death Ray Vision), guitarist Matt LeBreton (Downpour), guitarist Jon Donais and drummer Jon Morency (Let Us Prey). The band came about during COVID-19 pandemic and was composed of musicians who lived near each other so "we could get in the basement once a week and just do it the old school way of, you know, having some beers, jammin and just having fun with friends. And that's what it is. We're all friends from the same area. We're in the same scene. So things fell together really quickly and Matt LeBreton, the other guitar player, he writes a lot too. So between the both of us songs are coming out left and right pretty fast." The band's music is a cross between thrash metal and arena rock, like "Skid Row, Tesla, the mainstream MTV stuff that was in the eighties. And then also nineties metal and rock. Bands like Sepultura, Nevermore and Alice in Chains, Soundgarden, stuff like that."

=== Other appearances ===
In 2011, Bachand joined Times of Grace as a touring member replacing Daniel Struble who was unable to take part in the tour. Bachand played bass for both their European and US tours that year.

In 2018, Bachand provided guest vocals for the song "Take it to the Cross" on Stryper's album God Damn Evil.

In 2025, Bachand joined Hatebreed as a touring member following the group's dismissal of their long-time bass player Chris Beattie. He later switched to guitar after lead guitarist Wayne Lozinak stepped away during the band's European tour due to a brain tumor diagnosis.

== Equipment ==
Bachand uses a custom Ibanez Prestige RGA series guitar (MBM1 Matt Bachand Signature model) and two custom Ibanez SZ guitars. One SZ has a red finish and the other has a natural finish with a five-piece neck. All of his guitars feature active EMG pickups, an 81 in the bridge position and a 60 or 85 in the neck position. He also uses Engl amplifiers.

== Discography ==
Shadows Fall

Shadows Fall full discography

- Of One Blood (2000)
- Deadworld (EP) (2001)
- Fear Will Drag You Down (Compilation Album) (2002)
- The Art of Balance (2002)
- The War Within (2004)
- Fallout from the War (Compilation Album) (2006)
- Threads of Life (2007)
- Seeking the Way: The Greatest Hits (Compilation Album) (2007)
- Retribution (2009)
- Fire From the Sky (2012)

Act of Defiance

- Birth and the Burial (2015)
- Old Scars, New Wounds (2017)

Empty

- Before the Sunrise (1996)

Living Wreckage

- One Foot in the Grave (2021)
- Living Wreckage (2022)
