= Brian Fair =

American vocalist

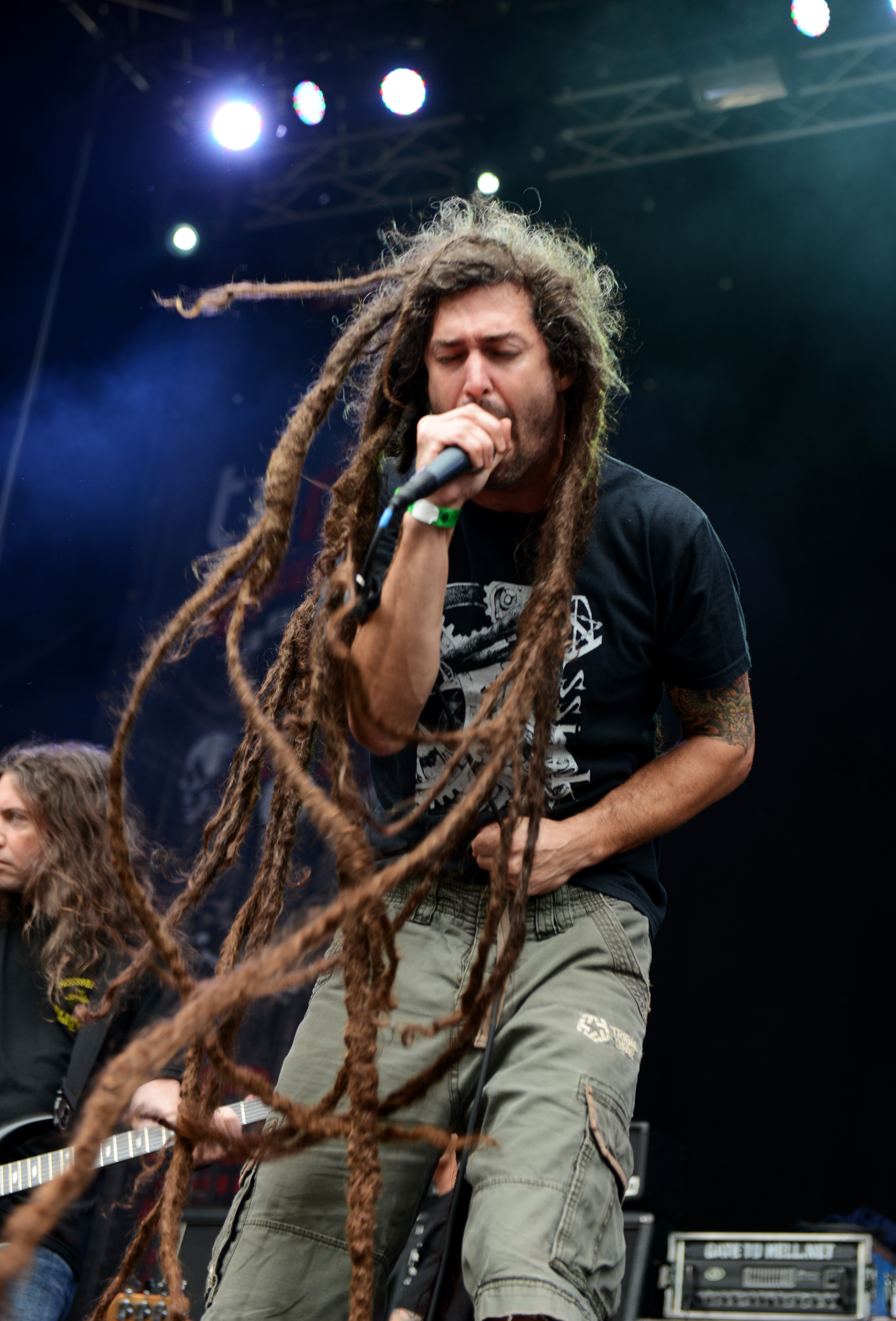
- Fair performing for Shadows Fall at Turock Open Air 2014 in Essen, Germany

Background information
- Born: Brian James Fair; May 30, 1975 (age 51)
- Origin: Boston, Massachusetts, U.S.
- Genres: Metalcore; hardcore punk; thrash metal
- Occupation: Singer
- Years active: 1991–present
- Member of: Shadows Fall; Transient; Hell Night; Downpour
- Formerly of: Overcast; Death Ray Vision

Brian James Fair (born May 30, 1975) is an American musician from Massachusetts, best known as lead vocalist of the metalcore band Shadows Fall.

== Early life ==
Brian Fair was born May 30, 1975 both his parents worked as teachers and were very supportive of his music career. From a young age, Brian Fair had always been known for his affinity for a wide range of music. First with his neighbor introducing him to the band KISS when he was 5 year old. Soon after he became interested in Ozzy Osbourne. During the 1980s Fair was an avid skateboarder and was introduced to both the punk and hardcore scenes via reading Thrasher magazine.

In seventh grade he had his first visit to a recording studio after he and two friends won a radio jingle contest (sponsored by Mass Electric) with a Beastie Boys-inspired tune "The Energy Conservation Rap Song." In middle and high school, he played bass and sang in a punk band called Frenzy which he started when he was 12-13 years old. The group performed at local underage shows. He graduated from Milford High School in 1993, and went on to study literature at Boston University.

== Career ==
=== Overcast ===
In the summer of his sophomore year (August 1991), Fair co-founded Overcast, an influential hardcore band in the Worcester music scene. While Fair was on vocals, Scott McCooe and Pete Cortese played guitar, Mike D'Antonio played bass, and Jay Fitzgerald played drums. Overcast's first 7-inch, Bleed Into One, was released in 1992 through Exchange Records. The band's first full-length, Expectational Dilution, was released in 1994 and is considered a groundbreaking effort as many claim that Overcast are the pioneers of the metalcore scene. Their final full-length, Fight Ambition To Kill, was released in 1997. This release was followed by nationwide touring with Shai Hulud and Disembodied. Overcast eventually split up in November 1998. In 2008 they got back together to release Reborn to Kill Again.

From 2014-2018 Fair and Overcast played again to play select live shows. This was met with another reunion in 2022 and the group have continued to live shows since.

=== Shadows Fall ===
Soon after Overcast disbanded, Fair joined Shadows Fall in place of Phil Labonte, who left due to creative differences. Soon after, the band signed to Century Media Records. The band recorded its second studio album Of One Blood with Fair on vocals in 2000. The release included re-recorded songs from Somber Eyes to the Sky.

Fair later stated that he was originally nervous to join the band at first stating "I was a bit nervous about stepping into a band that had already written material with another singer, especially since I knew my voice and lyrical approach were very different from what they had been doing. What made it easy was that I loved the music and was already really good friends with all the guys. When I went to jam for the first time and they played me "new" songs like "Serenity" and "First Noble Truth," I was blown away and knew we could make some sick music together."

Shadows Fall decided to change its style to find its own sound. Inspired by thrash, hard rock and power ballad influences, the band recorded its third studio album, titled The Art of Balance. Released on September 17, 2002, the album peaked at number 15 on the Billboard Top Independent albums chart. Shadows Fall released three music videos to promote the album; "Thoughts Without Words", "Destroyer of Senses", and "The Idiot Box". The Art of Balance featured a cover of the Pink Floyd song "Welcome to the Machine". Andy Hinds of Allmusic stated the album is "a modern heavy metal album that is both brutal and highly musical, traditional yet forward-thinking", but criticized the placement of "Welcome to the Machine", stating the song "is stylishly well-executed, but seems a tad out of place nonetheless." Shadows Fall supported The Art of Balance by touring on Ozzfest in 2003.

In 2004 he and the band released their fourth record The War Within which debuted at number 20 on the Billboard 200, and number 1 on the independent albums chart. He and the band also gained a Grammy nomination for their song “What Drives the Weak” in the Best Metal Performance at the 48th Annual Grammy Awards. Fair later reflected on this period in a 2024 interview stating “This record changed my entire life and took me around the world. We had been surprised by the success of The Art Of Balance and definitely felt a little pressure to take things to another level, but we did not allow that pressure to change our vision of the band we wanted to be.”

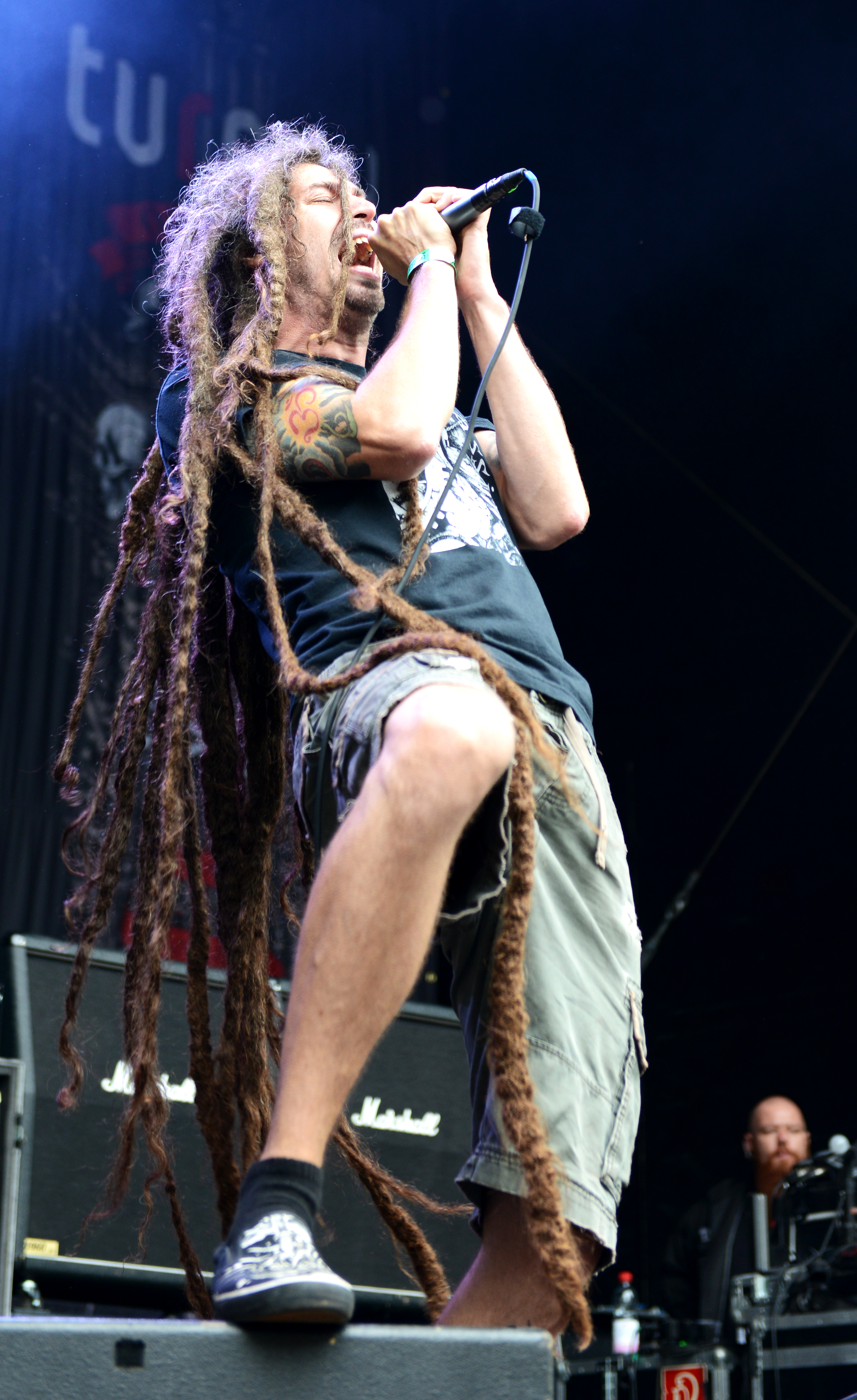
Fair at Turock Open Air in Germany, 2014

Fair continued with Shadows Fall as his main priority, and the band released several more records. On April 29, 2006, Overcast reunited to play at the New England Metal and Hardcore Festival. The band then announced and re-recorded archive material and two new tracks, produced by metal producer Nick Raskulinecz, under the name Reborn to Kill Again.

Shadows Fall's fifth record, Threads of Life, was released on April 3, 2007, through Atlantic Records and Roadrunner International. The album debuted at number 46 on the Billboard 200. The song “Redemption” garnered Fair and the band a second Grammy Award nomination for Best Metal Performance during The 50th Annual Grammy Awards. Fair stated "The song is a celebration of the power of music and the human voice as an agent of change and to have it recognized in such a way is incredible."

Fair also worked with Necro, an underground hip hop musician and producer, on his album entitled Death Rap. Fair appears on Death Rap's fifth track, "Suffocated to Death by God's Shadow", with Mark Morton (Lamb of God), Mike Smith (Suffocation), and Steve Di Giorgio (Death).

The sixth studio album from Shadows Fall, titled Retribution, was released on September 15, 2009, and the seventh, titled Fire from the Sky, on May 15, 2012. In August 2014 Shadow Falls announced they would be going on a Farwell tour and go on a indefinite hiatus.

On June 22, 2021, Fair confirmed that Shadows Fall were reuniting for their first show in over half a decade at the Worcester Palladium on December 18.

In December 2021, when asked by the Podioslave Podcast if there will be new music from Shadows Fall, Fair said, "We've talked about writing stuff, and there's a very definitive Shadows Fall approach to writing. So if Matt or Jon or Paul had ideas that really made sense, I'd see us pursuing 'em. But nothing right now. All we wanted to do is get through this show — we wanted to get through it, see if we could pull it off, see how it went. And now we're, like, 'Okay, now we can think about if we wanna do something else.' But nothing planned right now. I know Jon and Matt are riff machines — I'm sure they've got stuff — but they do also have other projects they're working on too… But right now we're just kind of recovering a little bit, trying to make sure I get my neck back in shape."

In a 2023 interview with Blabbermouth.net he announced the band was working on new material. On December 6, 2024, the band released new material for the first time in 12 years a single titled "In the Grey."

In 2025 Springfield Mayor Domenic Sarno, declared July 18, "Shadows Fall Day". The proclamation ceremony took place before the band’s set at the MassMutual Center, where they opened for Lamb of God. During their set, Fair held up the proclamation thanking the community for the recognition.

=== Other projects ===
In January 2003, a new space rock project called Transient was formed. Transient saw Fair taking a break from vocals, this time playing the guitar and the drums instead. Fair was reunited with Overcast member Scott McCooe, who was now playing bass. Transient released a three song demo, whose tracks were recorded by Pete Rutcho of Blistered Earth, in November 2004. This is Transient's only material to date.

Death Ray Vision is an American hardcore punk band from Massachusetts. The band includes members and former members of the bands Killswitch Engage, Shadows Fall, Cannae, Seemless, and Overcast. The band released their first studio album titled We Ain't Leavin' Till You're Bleedin' in 2013. The band also released an EP in 2011 titled Get Lost or Get Dead. In 2018 the band released a second LP titled Negative Mental Attitude. However Fair left the band that same year.

In 2016 Fair is signed with St. Louis hardcore band Hell Night, and has released multiple anlbums with the group. He also works in the music industry as a rep for Alvarez Guitars, Dixon Drums, and a number of other instrument lines.

In 2018, Fair collaborated with Derek Kerswill, Matt LeBreton and Pete Gelles to form the band Downpour. In 2014, they released their first single "The Serpent's Tongue" followed by "Beautiful Nothing" in August 2017. Their debut self titled album was released in September 2018. In 2024 they released a new Ep titled Kill the Mind.

== Style and lyrical themes ==
Fair is known for his dynamic vocal range, using screams, shouts and harsher vocals often especially in heavier, aggressive passages but also mixes in clean/melodic vocals. His vocals have been described as “gritty, and Hetfield influenced singing as well as his harsh vocals and bright, emotive clean singing.”

Fairs lyrics touch upon Internal Struggle, Spirituality, politics and personal topics. In an interview he stated that his lyrics with Shadows Fall are influenced by "life experience and a cumulative of acquiring knowledge through different readings and philosophy." Fair has often stated that the music (riffs, tempo, style) sets the vibe that lets lyrics go in a certain direction. For example, in Fire From the Sky, he mentions the music had an eerie dark vibe so the lyrics followed.

== Personal life ==
Fair is married and has a son and a daughter. Fair excerises regularly and is a fan of the Boston Celtics, usually wearing their jerseys during live shows.

Fair is most known for his dreadlocks that have been known to be a large part of his stage show. He says he has kept them ever since making them when he was almost 16 years old. His locks are currently just shy of his six foot two frame, reaching down to his ankles and a couple inches from touching the ground; according to Fair they weigh over a pound. He uses them in a windmill fashion to whip fans during live shows. Fair says in an interview that he does get it caught and pulled by things often, including car doors, office chairs, light fixtures and guitar pedals.

== Discography ==
=== With Overcast ===
- Bleed Into One (7-inch) (1992)
- Expectational Dilution (1994)
- Stirring the Killer (7-inch) (1995)
- Overcast/Arise Split CD (7-inch) (1996)
- Begging for Indifference (7-inch EP/CD) (1996)
- Fight Ambition to Kill (1997)
- Reborn to Kill Again (2008)

=== With Shadows Fall ===
Shadows Fall full discography

- Of One Blood (2000)
- Deadworld (EP) (2001)
- Fear Will Drag You Down (Compilation Album) (2002)
- The Art of Balance (2002)
- The War Within (2004)
- Fallout from the War (Compilation Album) (2006)
- Threads of Life (2007)
- Seeking the Way: The Greatest Hits (Compilation Album) (2007)
- Retribution (2009)
- Fire From the Sky (2012)

=== With Death Ray Vision ===
- We Ain't Leavin' Till You're Bleedin' (2013)
- Negative Mental Attitude (2018)

=== With Hell Night ===
- Human Shelves (2016)
- Hell Night Songs (2017)
- Cancercise (2017)
- Quarter Hour of Power Encapsulated Records compilation (2018)
- Split 7-inch EP with Sweat Shoppe (2018)
- Unlimited Destruction LP (2019)

=== Downpour ===
- Downpour (2018)
- Kill the Mind EP (2024)

=== Guest appearances ===
- Necro – Death Rap (Suffocated To Death By God's Shadow)
- Dead By Wednesday – The Darkest Of Angels (Live Again)
- Upon Stone – Dead Mother Moon (Paradise Failed)
- Bleeding Through — Nine (War Time)
