= Damnatio ad bestias =

Roman execution method

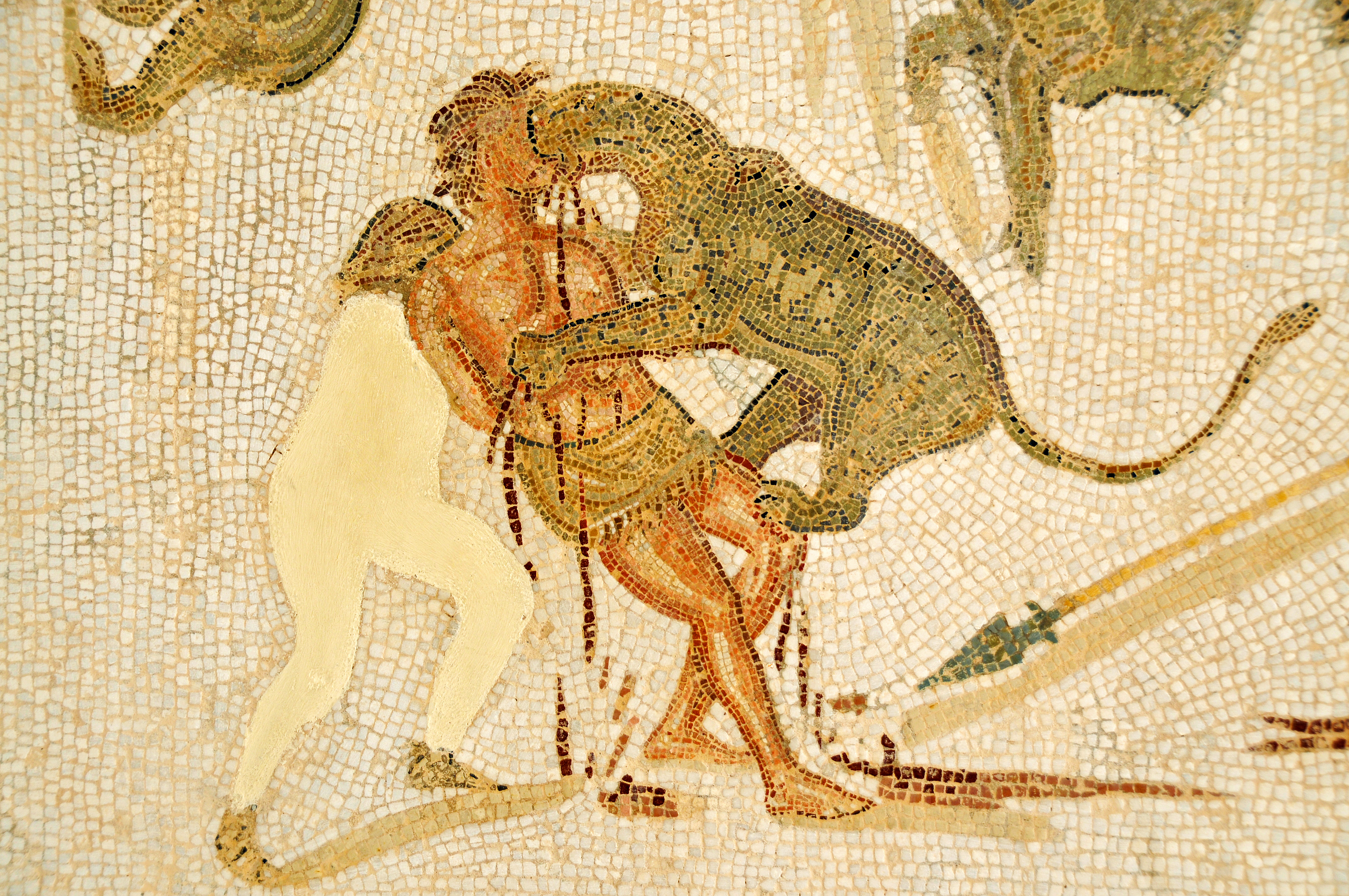
Leopard attacking a criminal, Roman floor mosaic, late 2nd century AD, Archaeological Museum of Tunisia

Damnatio ad bestias (Latin for "condemnation to beasts") was a form of Roman capital punishment where the condemned person was killed by wild animals, usually lions or other big cats. This form of execution, which first appeared during the Roman Republic around the 2nd century BC, was part of a wider class of blood sports called Bestiarii.

Public damnatio ad bestias was considered a common form of entertainment. Killings by wild animals formed part of the inaugural games of the Colosseum in AD 80. Between the 1st and 3rd centuries AD, this penalty was applied to the worst of criminals, runaway slaves, and Christians.

== History ==
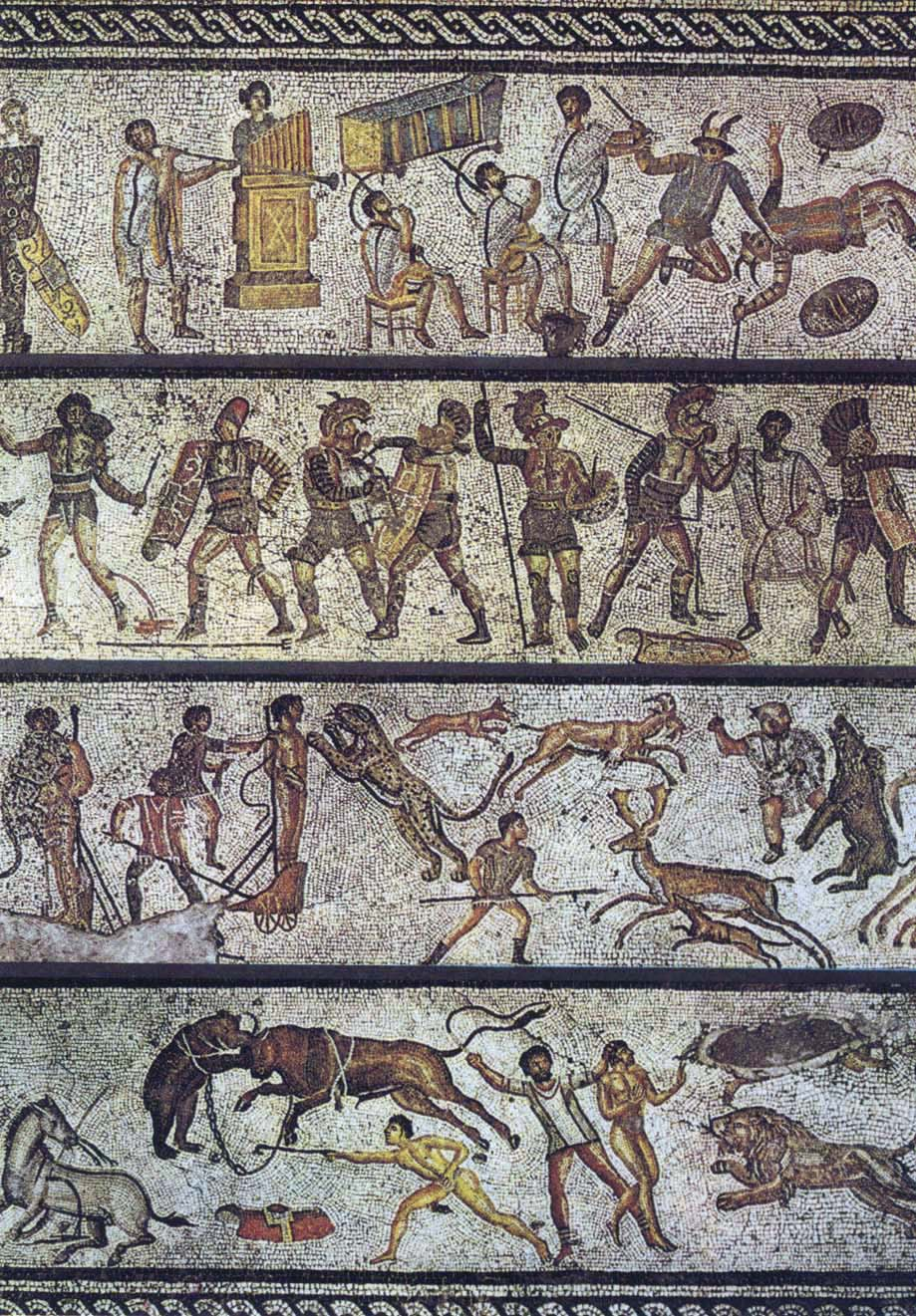
Gladiators in the circus arena, Zliten mosaic, 1st century AD

The exact purpose of early forms of damnatio ad bestias is not known. They might have been intended as religious sacrifices rather than as punishments, especially in regions where lions existed naturally and were revered by the population. In northern Africa, during the Mercenary War, Carthaginian general Hamilcar Barca threw prisoners to the beasts, whereas Hannibal forced Romans captured in the Punic Wars to fight each other, and the survivors had to stand against elephants.

There were no wild lions in Italy and human sacrifice had been banned in the Roman Kingdom since the 7th century BC, according to legends which attributed this ban to Numa Pompilius. When damnatio ad bestias appeared there later, it was as a punishment and spectacle rather than as a spiritual practice.

=== Terminology ===
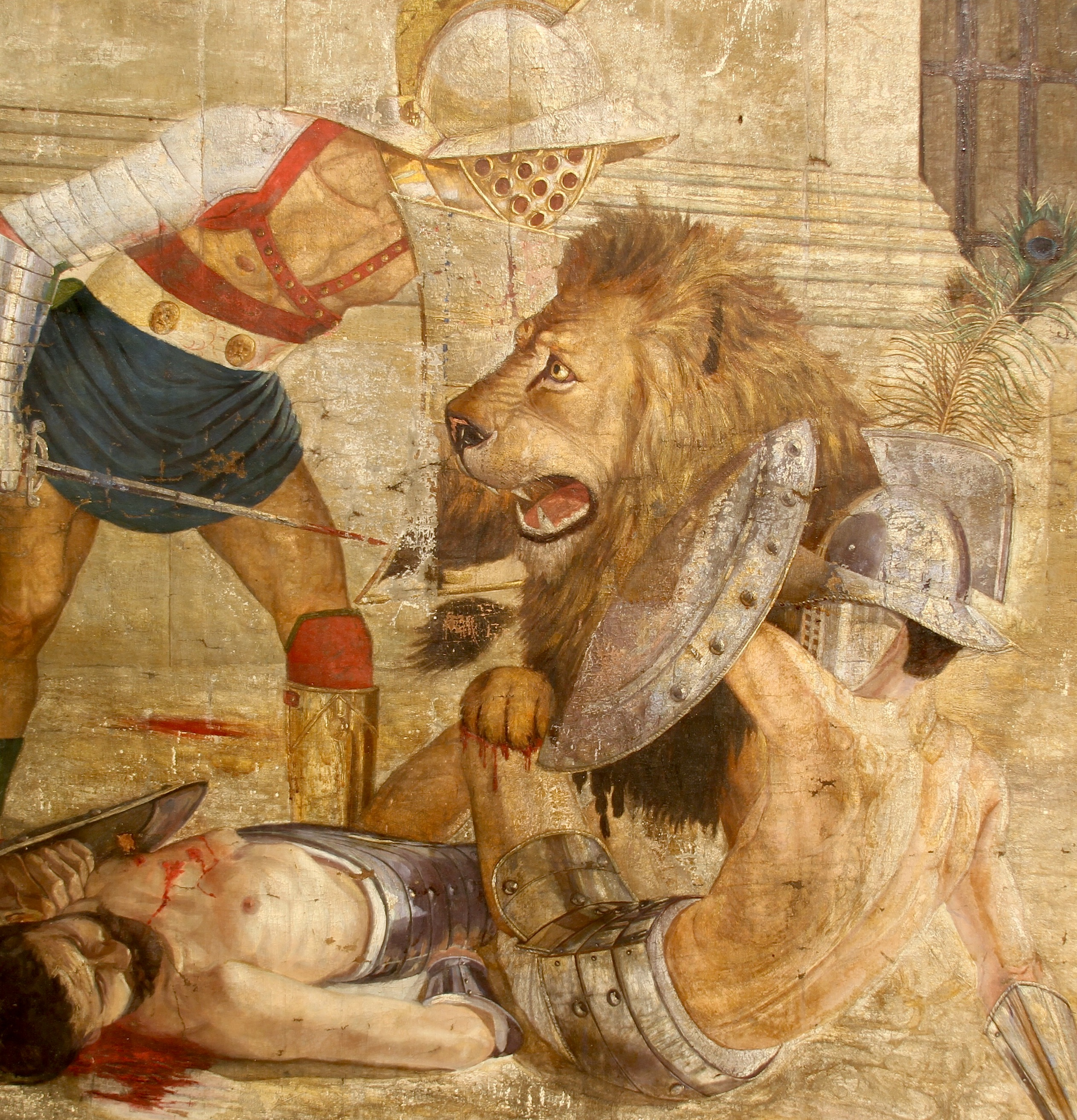
Gladiators fighting a barbary lion

Whereas the term damnatio ad bestias is usually used in a broad sense, historians distinguish two subtypes: obicĕre bestiis (to throw to beasts) where the humans are defenseless, and damnatio ad bestias, where the punished are both expected and prepared to fight. In addition, there were professional beast fighters trained in special schools, such as the Roman Morning School, which received its name by the timing of the games. These schools taught not only fighting but also the behavior and taming of animals. The fighters were released into the arena dressed in a tunic and armed only with a spear (occasionally with a sword). They were sometimes assisted by venators (hunters), who used bows, spears and whips. Such group fights were not human executions but rather staged animal fighting and hunting. Various animals were used, such as elephants, rhinoceroses, wild boars, buffaloes, hippopotamuses, aurochs, bears, lions, tigers, leopards, hyenas, and wolves. The first such staged hunting (Latin: venatio) featured lions and panthers, and was arranged by Marcus Fulvius Nobilior in 186 BC at the Circus Maximus on the occasion of the Greek conquest of Aetolia. The Colosseum and other circuses still contain underground hallways that were used to lead the animals to the arena.

=== History and description ===
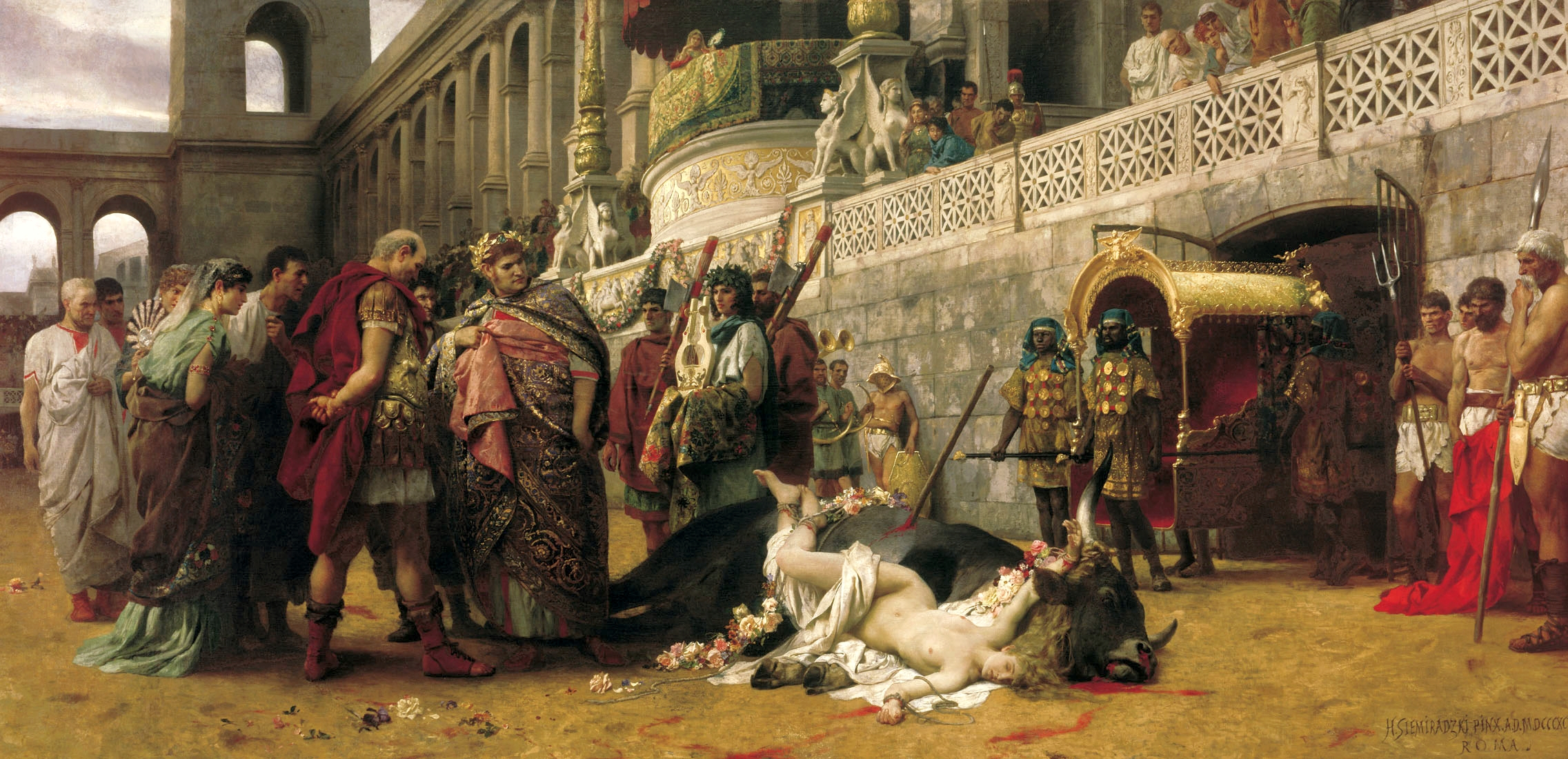
Christian Dirce by Henryk Siemiradzki (National Museum, Warsaw) shows the punishment of a Roman woman who had converted to Christianity. At the Emperor Nero's wish, the woman, like mythological Dirce, was tied to a wild bull and dragged around the arena.

The custom of submitting criminals to lions was brought to ancient Rome by two commanders, Lucius Aemilius Paullus Macedonicus, who defeated the Macedonians in 167 BC, and his son Scipio Aemilianus, who conquered the African city of Carthage in 146 BC. It was originally a military punishment, possibly borrowed from the Carthaginians. Rome reserved its earliest use for non-Roman military allies found guilty of defection or desertion. The sentenced were tied to columns or thrown to the animals, practically defenseless (i.e. obicĕre bestiis).

Among the documented cases of damnatio ad bestias in ancient Rome is the execution of the rebel slave leader Selurus, witnessed by Strabo. Such executions were also documented by Seneca the Younger and Lucretius. Pompey used damnatio ad bestias for showcasing battles and, during his second consulate (55 BC), staged a fight between heavily armed gladiators and 18 elephants. In a letter to a friend, Cicero described these games as splendid but tasteless, noting that a "man of refinement" could find no pleasure in repeatedly seeing how "a weak man is torn by an extremely powerful animal". Fictitious instances are featured in Petronius's Satyricon and in Apuleius's novel The Golden Ass.

Some convicts were killed in executions deliberately arranged to resemble scenes from mythology. Martial, who wrote about the Colosseum's opening games in his Book of Spectacles, described how a man dressed as Orpheus playing his lyre was ripped apart by a bear. Similarly, the bandit Laureolus was crucified and then devoured by an eagle and a bear in a deadly staging of the myth of Prometheus.

The most popular animals were tigers, which were imported to Rome in significant numbers specifically for damnatio ad bestias. Brown bears, brought from Gaul, Germany and even North Africa, were less popular. Local municipalities were ordered to provide food for animals in transit and not delay their stay for more than a week. Some historians believe that the mass export of animals to Rome had a serious impact on wildlife numbers in North Africa.

=== Execution of Christians ===
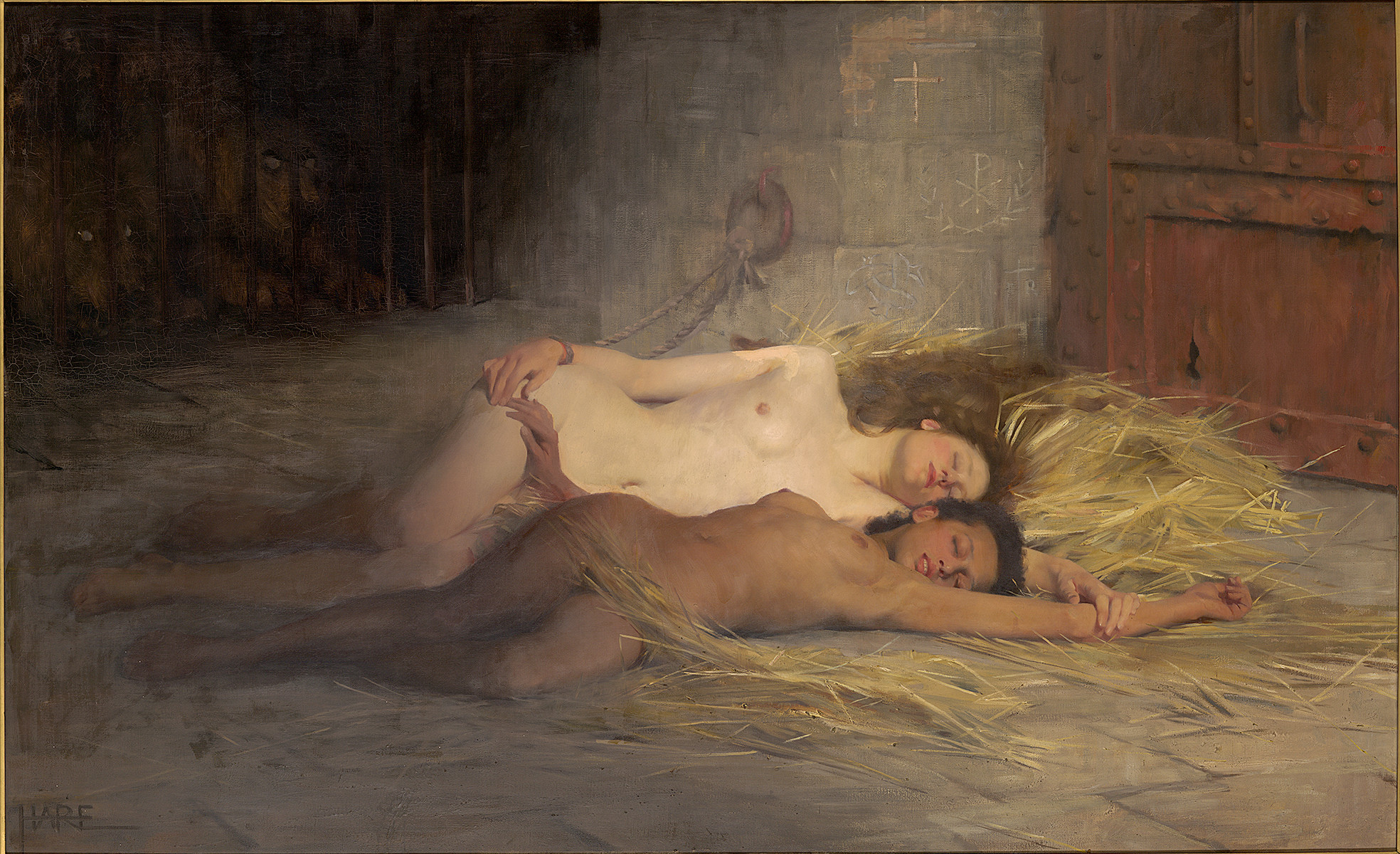
The Victory of Faith, by Saint George Hare, depicts two naked Christian women on the eve of their damnatio ad bestias with animals in the background.

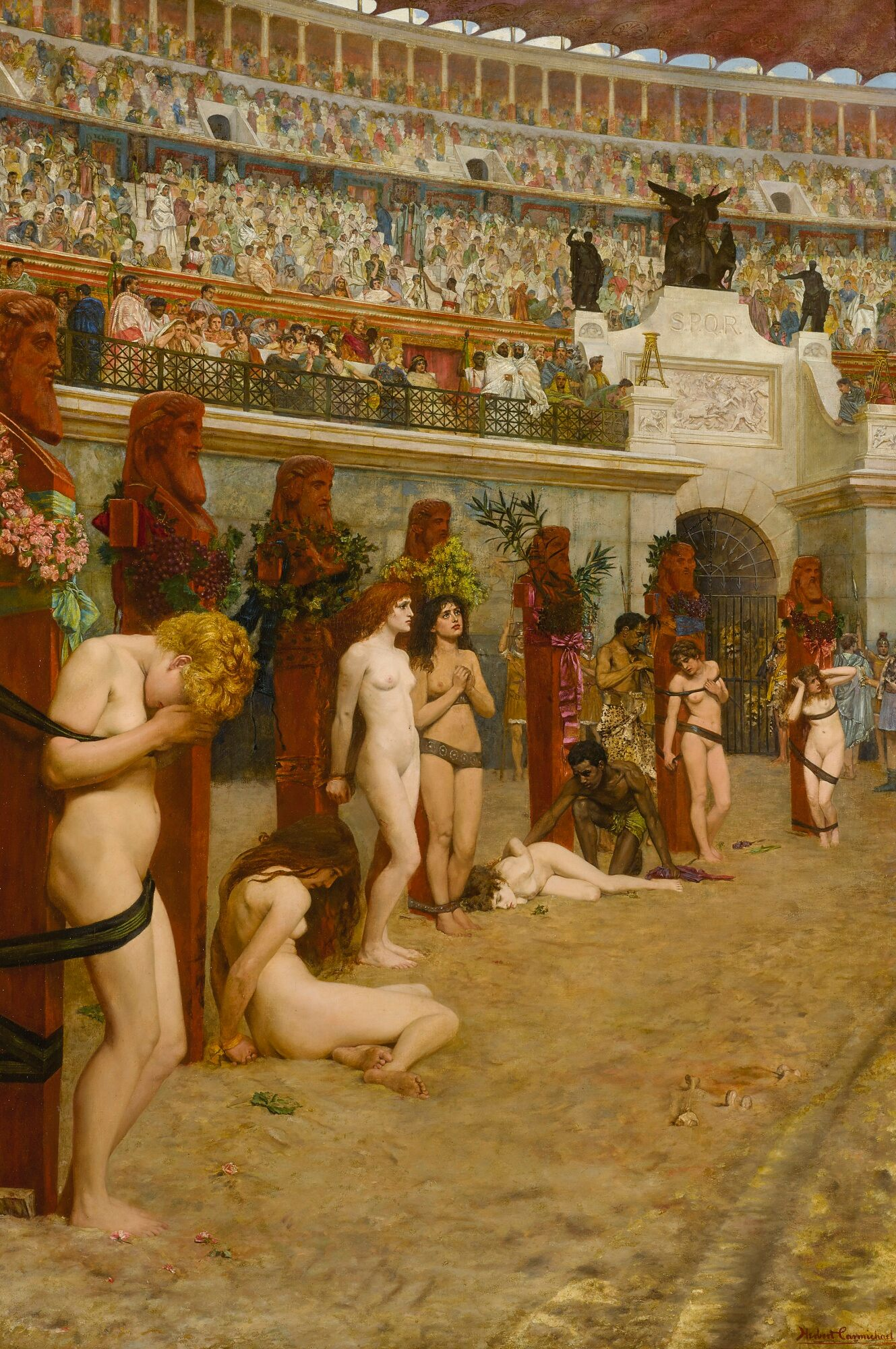
Faithful Unto Death by Herbert Schmalz. Tying women to pillars or poles and stripping them of clothing in public was a common practice in the condemnation of Christian women.

The use of damnatio ad bestias against Christians began in the 1st century AD. Tacitus states that during the first persecution of Christians under the reign of Nero (after the Great Fire of Rome in AD 64), people were wrapped in animal skins (called tunica molesta) and thrown to dogs. This practice was followed by other emperors who moved it into the arena and used larger animals. Application of damnatio ad bestias to Christians was intended to equate them with the worst criminals, who were usually punished this way.

There is no conclusive evidence that Christians were ever executed in the Colosseum in Rome, though it is quite plausible that some of them were. According to Roman laws, Christians were:

1. Guilty of high treason (majestatis rei)
  1. For their worship Christians gathered in secret and at night, making unlawful assembly, and participation in such collegium illicitum or coetus nocturni was equated with a riot.
  2. For their refusal to honor images of the emperor by libations and incense
2. Dissenters from the state gods (άθεοι, sacrilegi)
3. Followers of magic prohibited by law (magi, malefici)
4. Confessors of a religion unauthorized by the law (religio nova, peregrina et illicita), according to the Twelve Tables).

The spread of the practice of throwing Christians to beasts was reflected by the Christian writer Tertullian (2nd century AD). He states that the general public blamed Christians for any general misfortune and after natural disasters would cry "Away with them to the lions!" This is the only reference from contemporaries mentioning Christians being thrown specifically to lions. Tertullian also wrote that Christians started avoiding theatres and circuses, which were associated with the place of their torture.

"The Passion of St. Perpetua, St. Felicitas, and their Companions", a text which purports to be an eyewitness account, as written by Vibia Perpetua, of a group of Christians condemned to damnatio ad bestias at Carthage in AD 203, states that the men were required to dress in the robes of a priest of the Roman god Saturn, the women as priestesses of Ceres. They were brought back out in separate groups and first the men, then the women, exposed to a variety of wild beasts.

At the resistance of Perpetua, however, the tribune relented and the prisoners were allowed to enter wearing their own clothing. The two young women, Perpetua and a slave girl Felicitas, were reserved as a finale to the executions to face a wild cow. Since it was thought that public nudity would not cast doubt on their fidelity, further degradation was added by not only fully exposing them to the beast but using one of their own sex rather than the usual male animal. The implication was that the women were shown as not being women enough to commit adultery. After having all their clothing removed Perpetua and Felicitas were driven into the arena covered only in see-through netting. As this proved too much for the crowd, they were brought back to be clothed in plain loose garments before being sent in again to face the beast.

This is also not the only instance of such treatment being used on Christian women, many also customarily subjected to other punishments and harsh tortures beforehand. More generally though, in contrast to their clothed male counterparts, women were tied fully naked to stakes or pillars with their hands behind their backs. Full body exposure of a female to a bull after being entirely stripped of all her clothing was one aspect of her shaming, the implications being that she was not regarded in the same way as attired male competitors and allowed to fight any "beast" but rendered helpless, and that being denuded in public would imply a charge of adultery on the part of the woman.

Those who survived the first animal attacks were either brought back out for further exposure to the beasts or executed in public by a gladiator.

The persecution of Christians ceased by the 4th century AD. The Edict of Milan (AD 313) gave them freedom of religion.

=== Penalty for other crimes ===
Roman laws, which are known to us through the Byzantine collections, such as the Code of Theodosius and Code of Justinian, defined which criminals could be thrown to beasts (or condemned by other means). They included:

- Deserters from the army
- Those who employed sorcerers to harm others, during the reign of Caracalla. This law was re-established in AD 357 by Constantius II
- Poisoners; by the law of Cornelius, patricians were beheaded, plebeians thrown to lions, and slaves were crucified
- Counterfeiters, who could also be burned alive
- Political criminals. For example, after the overthrow and assassination of Commodus, the new emperor threw to lions both the servants of Commodus and Narcissus who strangled him. Even though Narcissus brought the new emperor to power, he committed the crime of murdering the previous one. The same punishment was applied to Mnesteus who organized the assassination of Emperor Aurelian.
- Patricides, who were normally drowned in a leather bag filled with snakes (poena cullei), but could be thrown to beasts if a suitable body of water was not available.
- Instigators of uprisings, who were either crucified, thrown to beasts or exiled, depending on their social status.
- Those who kidnapped children for ransom, according to the law of AD 315 by the Emperor Constantine the Great, were either thrown to beasts or beheaded.

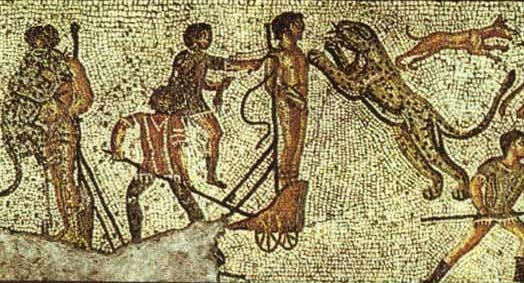
Beast fighters and criminals being executed, the Zliten leopard, mosaic from c. AD 200

The sentenced was deprived of civil rights; he could not write a will, and his property was confiscated. Exception from damnatio ad bestias was given to military servants and their children. Also, the law of Petronius (Lex Petronia) of AD 61 forbade employers to send their slaves to be eaten by animals without a judicial verdict. Local governors were required to consult a Roman deputy before staging a fight of skilled gladiators against animals.

The practice of damnatio ad bestias was abolished in Rome in AD 681. It was used once after that in the Byzantine Empire: in 1022, when several disgraced generals were arrested for plotting a conspiracy against Emperor Basil II, they were imprisoned and their property seized, but the royal eunuch who assisted them was thrown to lions.

== Notable victims, according to various Christian traditions ==
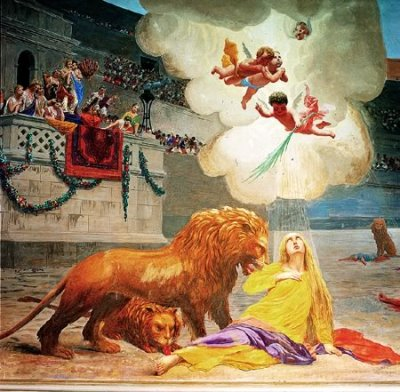
The Martyrdom of St. Euphemia

- Ignatius of Antioch (AD 107, Rome)
- Glyceria (AD 141, Trayanopolis, Thrace)
- Blandina (AD 177, Lyon)
- Perpetua and Felicity, Saturus and others (AD 203, presumably Carthage)
- Germanicus, second half of the 2nd century, Smyrna, (mentioned in the Martyrdom of Polycarp of Smyrna)
- Euphemia, (AD 303, probably at Chalcedon)
- Marciana of Mauretania, (AD 303, Caesarea, Mauretania Caesariensis)
- Agapius (AD 306, Caesarea)

=== Survived, according to various legends ===
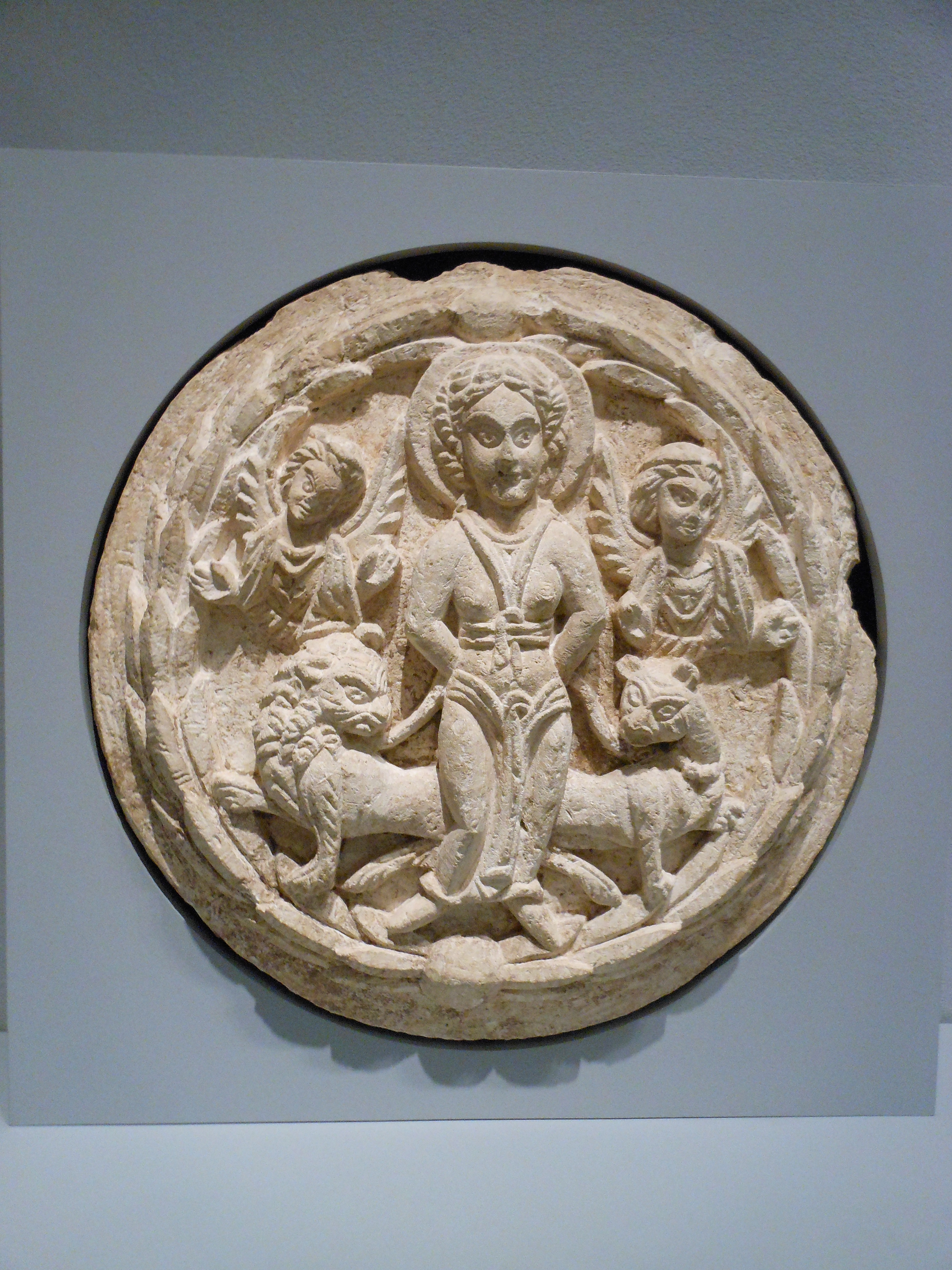
Saint Thecla and the Wild Beasts, probably from Egypt, 5th century AD, Nelson-Atkins Museum

- An early description of escape from the death by devouring is in the story of Daniel in the Book of Daniel (c. 2nd century BC).
- The Greek writer Apion (1st century AD) tells the story of a slave Androcles (during Caligula's rule) who was caught after fleeing his master and thrown to a lion. The lion spared him, which Androcles explained by saying that he pulled a thorn from the paw of the very same lion when hiding in Africa, and the lion remembered him.
- Mammes of Caesarea, according to Christian legend
- Paul (according to apocrypha and the medieval legends, based on his note "when I have fought with beasts at Ephesus", 1 Corinthians, 15:32)
- Thecla, according to the apocryphal story Acts of Paul and Thecla
- An anecdotal escape is reported in the biography of Emperor Gallienus (in the Augustan History). A man was caught after selling the emperor's wife glass instead of gems. Gallienus sentenced him to face lions, but ordered that a capon rather than a lion be let into the arena. The emperor's herald then proclaimed "he has forged, and was treated the same". The merchant was then released.

== Description in popular culture ==
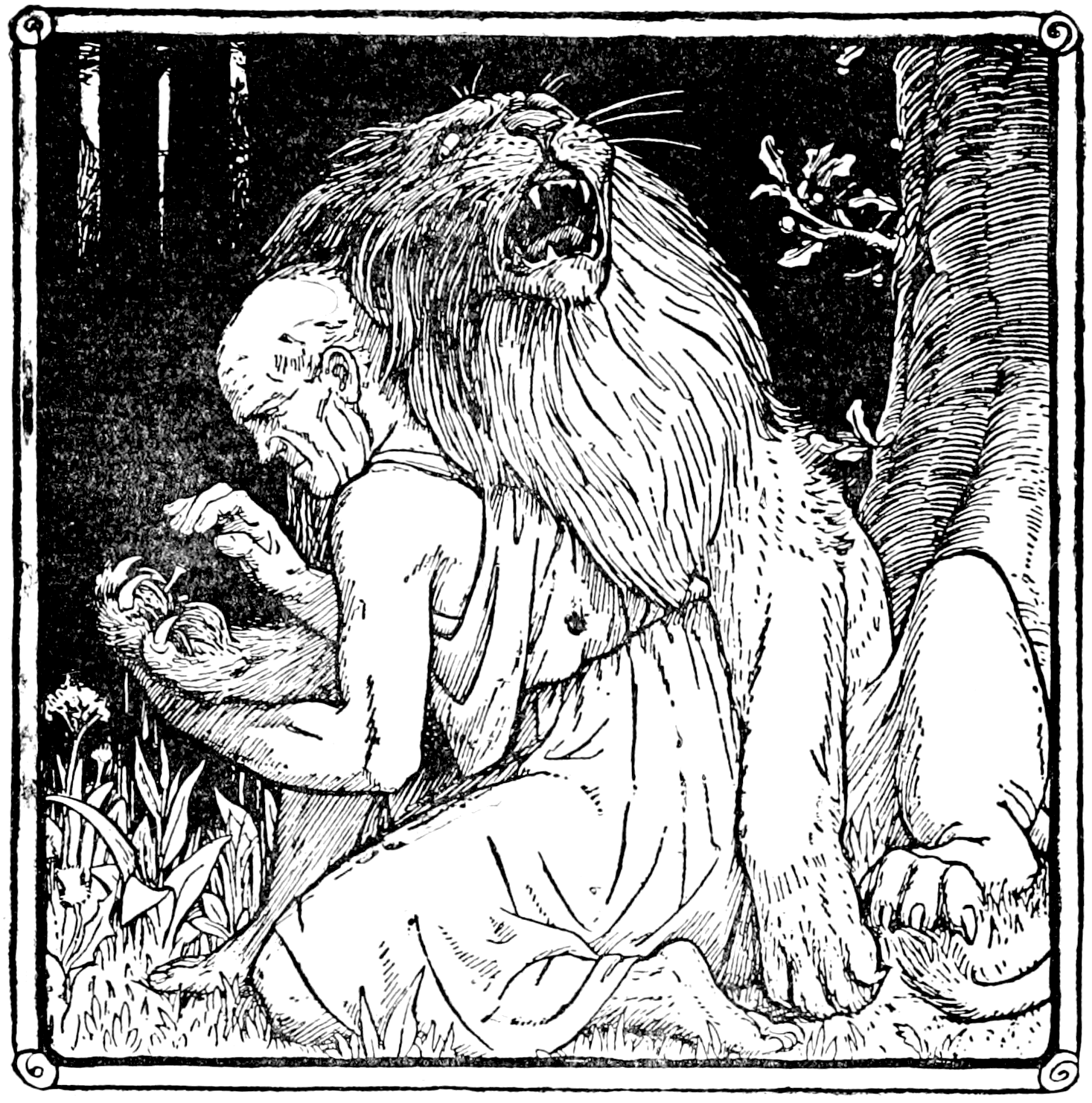
Androcles pulling a thorn from the lion's paw

=== Literature ===
- Tommaso Campanella in his utopia The City of the Sun suggests using damnatio ad bestias as a form of punishment.
- George Bernard Shaw. Androcles and the Lion
- Henryk Sienkiewicz. Quo Vadis
- Lindsey Davis. Two for the Lions

=== Film ===
- Fights against wild animals in the arena of the Roman Colosseum were displayed in Gladiator (2000) and other films.

=== Music ===
- The Canadian death metal band Ex Deo has a song titled "Pollice Verso (Damnatio ad Bestia)" on the album Caligvla.

== Gallery ==
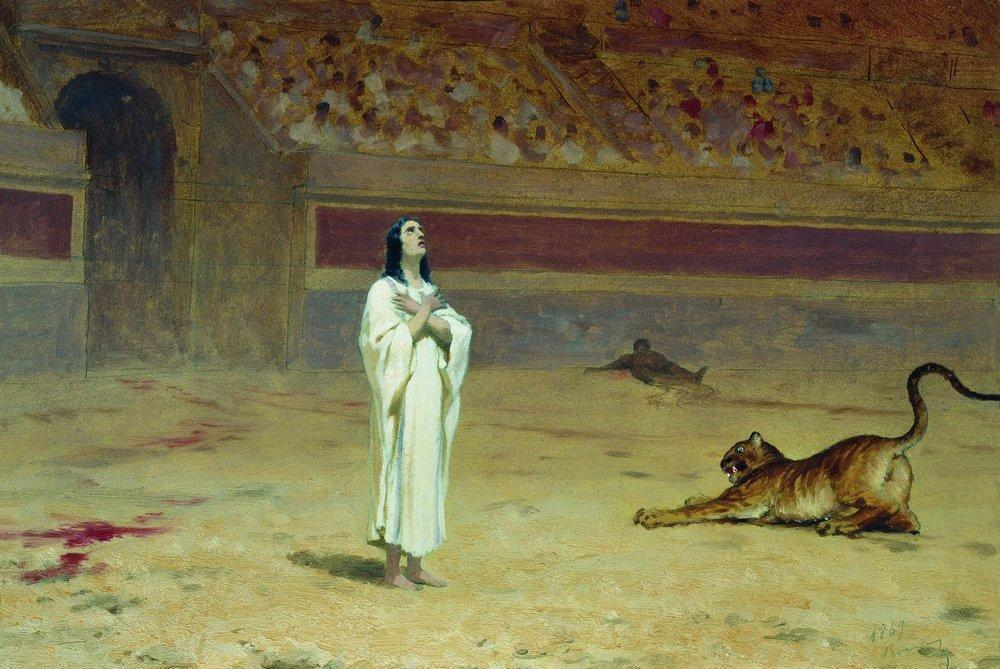
Martyr in the Circus Arena by Fyodor Bronnikov, 1869

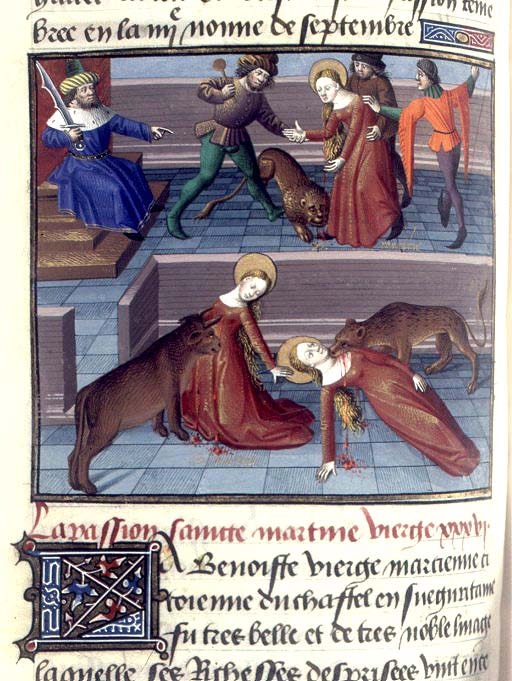
Martyrdom of Saint Marcienne, 15th-century miniature

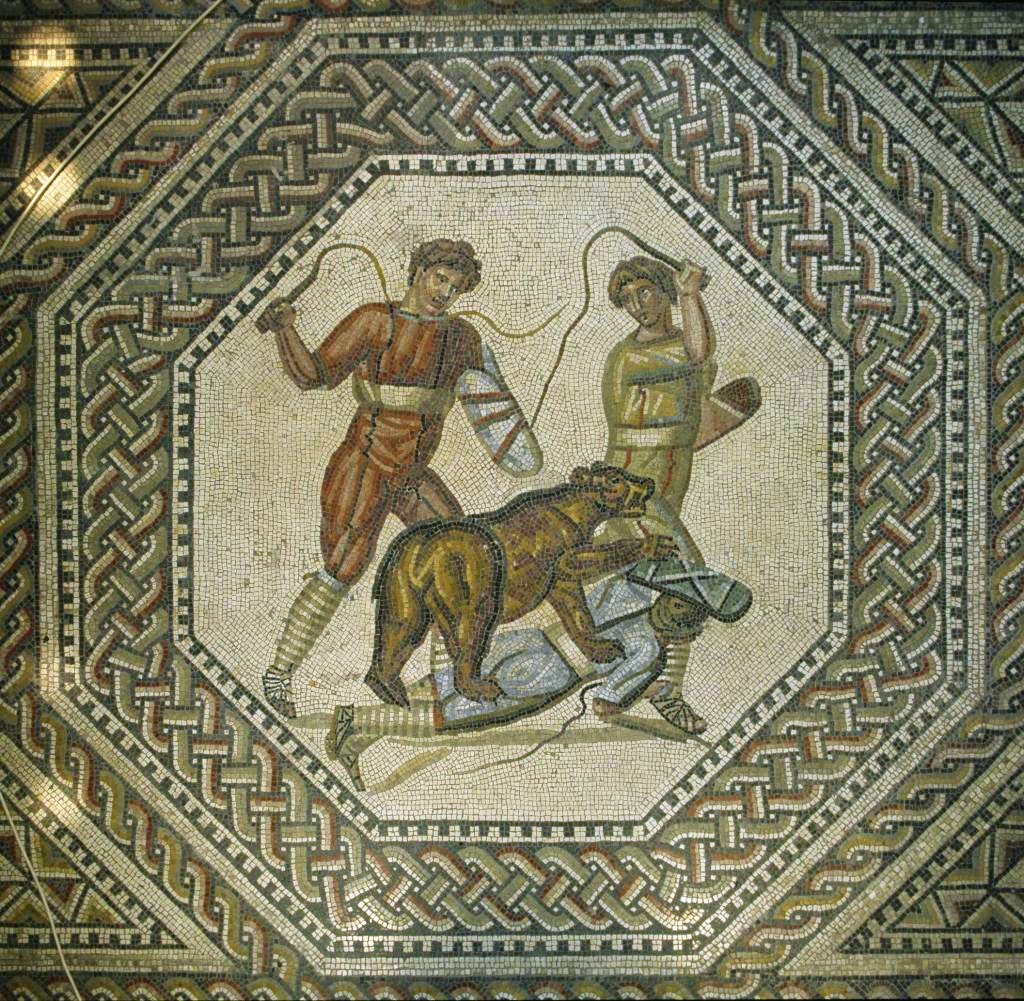
Bear devouring a criminal. Roman mosaic

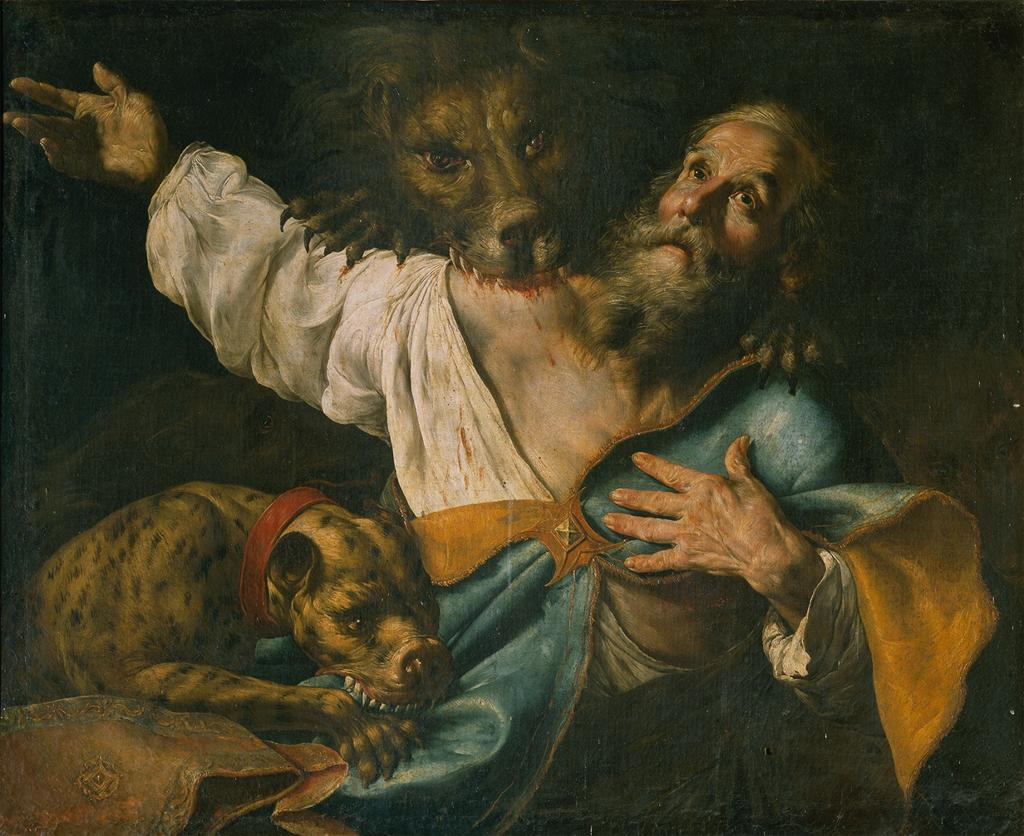
Ignatius of Antioch torn by lions

== See also ==
- Outline of capital punishment
- Animal trial
- Atlas bear
- Blood sport
- Damnatio memoriae
- Execution by elephant
- Persecution of Christians in the Roman Empire
- Poena cullei
- Public execution

== Bibliography ==
- Scott, S. P. (1932). The Civil Law, including The Twelve Tables, The Institutes of Gaius, The Rules of Ulpian, The Opinions of Paulus, The Enactments of Justinian, and The Constitutions of Leo.. Central Trust Company.
