= Colosseum: Rome's Arena of Death =

- BBC DVD Cover
- Genre: Documentary
- Written by: Tilman Remme
- Directed by: Tilman Remme
- Starring: Robert Shannon; Derek Lea
- Voices of: Ross Kemp; John Benjamin Hickey
- Narrated by: Michael Pennington; Liev Schreiber
- Composer: Ilan Eshkeri
- Country of origin: United Kingdom
- Original language: English

Production
- Executive producers: Jonathan Stamp; Laurence Rees
- Producer: Tilman Remme
- Cinematography: Peter Greenhalgh
- Editor: Malcolm Daniel
- Running time: 59 minutes

Original release
- Network: BBC One
- Release: 13 October 2003

Related
- Pyramid; Pompeii: The Last Day

Colosseum: Rome's Arena of Death a.k.a. Colosseum: A Gladiator's Story is a 2003 BBC Television and France 2 docudrama which tells the true story of Verus, a gladiator who fought at the Colosseum in Rome.

== Plot ==
The opening scene in A.D. 80 shows preparations for gladiatorial battle in the Inaugural games of the Flavian Amphitheatre. Verus walking out toward the arena, as a voice-over narrator states that the contest of Verus in the Colosseum is the only one recorded in detail. Details of gladiator life are contained in documents from that period. This is Verus' story.

Flashback to 79, when Roman forces took a village in Moesia, and Verus with others is marched 50 miles to work in a quarry the slaves call "the pit", preparing stone for building an amphitheater the Emperor Vespasian intends to use for gaining popular support from the people. An owner ("Lanista") of a gladiatorial school arrives with his trainer to choose recruits, but when Verus is not chosen he sees an opportunity and assaults a fellow slave he does not know, Priscus. Their fight is broken up and they are both taken with the others to Rome and trained, and Verus and Priscus become friends.

All new gladiators fight in small arenas scattered around Rome, and when Verus is defeated, he requests a second chance, knowing he will not be given another, and defeats his opponent. Contrary to popular myth, not all contests end in death. If a gladiator was killed the game's sponsor had to pay for his replacement. As a gladiator, you had a near 90% chance of surviving the fight. And if a gladiator was injured, he was given some of the best medical care available in Rome. Roman doctors were renowned for their treatment of flesh wounds. Doctors who worked with gladiators helped to pioneer the treatment of fractures. And they used an opium-based anesthetic for operations. For each victory in the arena, a gladiator is paid the equivalent of a Roman soldier's yearly pay, and he can purchase some personal items. Priscus obtains a small prayer statue and wall-shelf for his own Celtic devotions.

Proper burial was very important to the Romans, and gladiators frequently formed "funeral clubs" to ensure that they would receive a proper burial if they died. When a fellow gladiator dies, during the funeral procession to the cemetery, the narrator says that gladiator burial stones are inscribed with their names, origins, fights and death. Verus and Priscus promise widow their support.

Gladiators are admired by aristocratic women of Rome, especially rich widows, and are included in feasts and banquets hosted by public officials and members of the imperial court. Verus soon becomes known for his skill and victories. He is eyed by an Imperial lady, and is soon summoned to a party at night, hosted by Titus and the lady, where arriving he is suddenly attacked by another gladiator provoking a surprise fight arranged as "entertainment"; but he defeats his opponent, whose death the host commands. Verus kills him, his first: "not in the arena, but at a party for the rich." He is numb. Afterward, upon returning to his school, Verus discovers Priscus has been sold to another school; the trainer says, "it's only business."

Vespasian dies June A.D. 79. Titus, unpopular and with many enemies, decides to finish the Amphitheater quickly. Vesuvius then erupts (24 August 79), the economy falters, and this project is almost his only hope of gaining popular support. The inaugural day of the Games arrives and tickets are free. Animals have been brought in, and the Beast Master's difficult task is to train them to go against their nature and kill before screaming crowds; but if the animals fail to perform, the Beast Master is blamed and the normal punishment is inflicted: public execution in the arena.

Titus, presiding over the Games, allows the crowd to decide death or life. At the climax of the day's contests, Verus has been matched to another famous gladiator. It is Priscus, and they must fight to the death. Their fight is long and desperate, and then they are stopped by the fight master. Titus sends to each of them a Palm of Victory and a Wooden Sword, granting them both their freedom. The crowd is jubilant. A poet memorializes their battle.

As Verus is seen returning on the road to his village in Moesia, the narrator says that when Titus died 6 months later from a mystery illness, he had become the most popular emperor in Roman history.

== Production ==
The film was produced by the BBC in co-production with the Discovery Channel, France 2 and NDR.

BBC History commissioned the online-game Gladiator: Dressed to Kill and the animation Colosseum: Building the Arena of Death to tie-in with the series.

== Awards ==
- British Academy Television Awards 2004
  - Nominated: Best Photography (Factual): Peter Greenhalgh

== Cast ==
- Robert Shannon as Verus
- Derek Lea as Priscus
- Jamel Aroui as Titus
- Hichem Rostom as Lanista
- Lotfi Dziri as Trainer
- Dorra Zarrouk as Imperial lady

== DVD release ==
- Released on Region 1 DVD by BBC Video on 2 November 2004.
