= Supervolcano (disambiguation) =

A supervolcano is a type of volcano.

Supervolcano may also refer to:

- Supervolcano, a 2005 television disaster film
- Supervolcano, a series of novels by Harry Turtledove
