= Inaugural games of the Colosseum =

Roman games held in 80CE

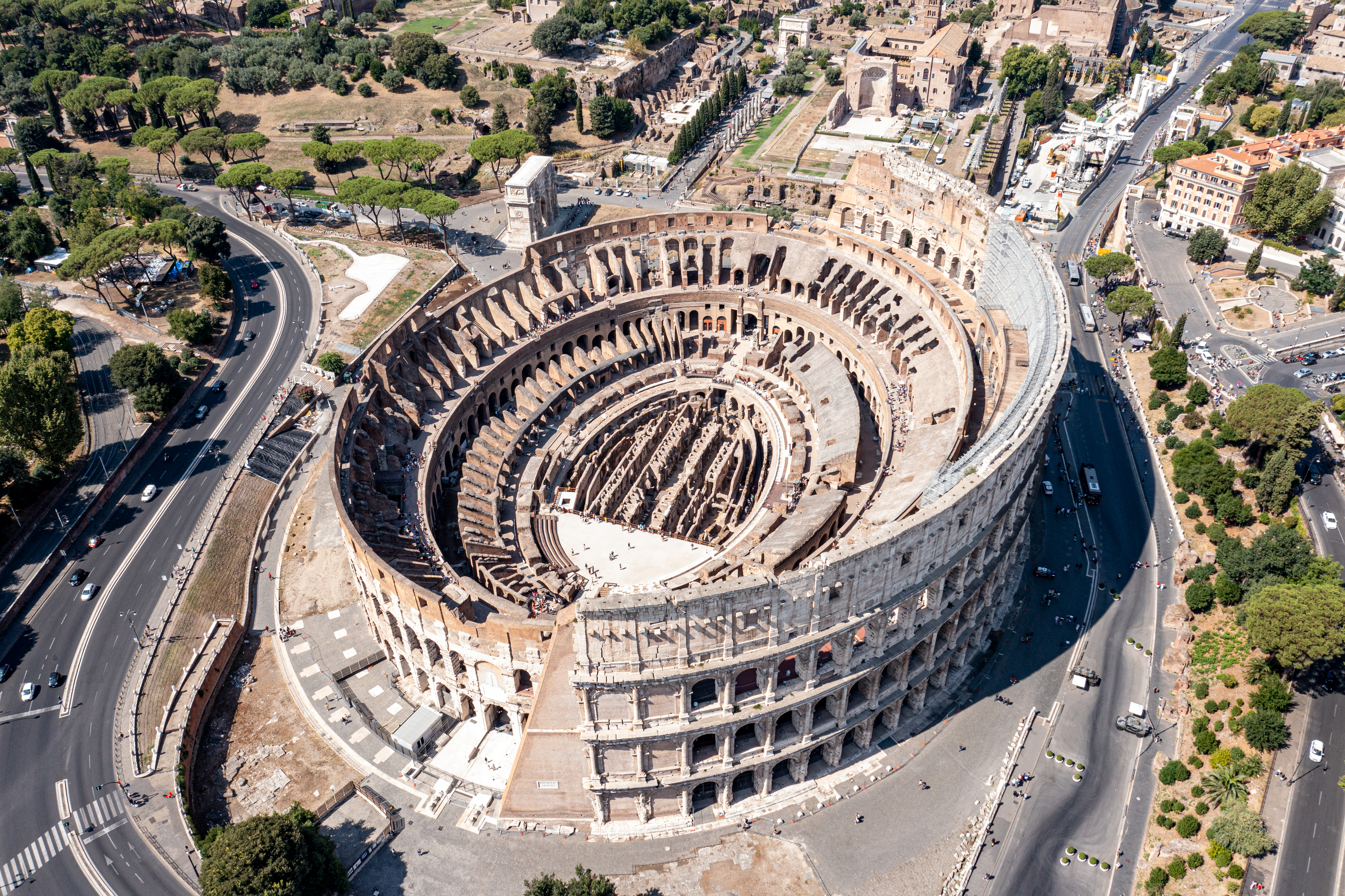
Though in ruins, the Flavian Amphitheatre, now known as the Colosseum, still stands today.

The inaugural games were held, on the orders of the Roman Emperor Titus, to celebrate the completion in AD 80 (81 according to some sources) of the Colosseum, then known as the Flavian Amphitheatre (Latin: Amphitheatrum Flavium).

Vespasian began construction of the amphitheatre around AD 70 and it was completed by his son Titus, who became emperor following Vespasian's death in AD 79. Titus' reign began with months of disasters – including the Eruption of Mount Vesuvius in 79 AD, a fire in Rome, and an outbreak of plague – he inaugurated the completion of the structure with lavish games that lasted for more than one hundred days, perhaps in an attempt to appease the Roman public and the gods.

Little literary evidence survives of the activities of the gladiatorial training and fighting (ludi). They appear to have followed the standard format of the Roman games: animal entertainments in the morning session, followed by the executions of criminals around midday, with the afternoon session reserved for gladiatorial combats and recreations of famous battles. The animal entertainments, which featured creatures from throughout the Roman Empire, included extravagant hunts and fights between different species. Animals also played a role in some executions which were staged as recreations of myths and historical events. Naval battles formed part of the spectacles but whether these took place in the amphitheatre or on a lake that had been specially constructed by Augustus is a topic of debate among historians.

Only three contemporary or near-contemporary accounts of the games survive. The works of Suetonius and Cassius Dio focus on major events, while Martial provides some fragments of information on individual entertainments and the only detailed record of a gladiatorial combat in the arena known to survive: the fight between Verus and Priscus.

== Background ==
=== Construction of the amphitheatre ===
Construction of the Colosseum started under Vespasian in a low valley surrounded by the Caelian, Esquiline and Palatine hills. The site became available to Nero by the Great Fire of Rome in AD 64 and redeveloped for his personal enjoyment with the construction of a huge artificial lake in the Domus Aurea, and a colossal statue of himself.

Vespasian started his own redevelopment of the site around AD 70 to 72, possibly funding the construction with booty seized after the Roman victory in the First Jewish-Roman War in AD 70. The lake was in-filled and the site designated as the location for the Flavian Amphitheatre. Reverting the private use by Nero to a more popular social purpose of a colosseum raised Vespasian's popularity. Gladiatorial schools (ludi) and other support buildings were later constructed within the former grounds of the Domus Aurea, much of which had been torn down.

Vespasian died just as the structure had reached the third story. Within a year of Vespasian's death, Titus was able to finish construction of the amphitheatre and the adjacent public baths (which were to be called the Baths of Titus).

=== Reign of Titus ===
By the time the amphitheatre was completed, Titus's short reign had already endured a series of disasters: two months after he had succeeded Vespasian, Mount Vesuvius had erupted, destroying Pompeii, Herculaneum, Stabiae, and Oplontis; a fire had burned in the city of Rome for three days and three nights causing substantial damage and destroying the Temple of Jupiter that had recently been restored by Vespasian; and there had been an outbreak of plague which was said to be the worst the city had ever endured. To dedicate the amphitheatre and the baths, and probably in an attempt to mollify both the Roman public and the gods, Titus inaugurated the opening of the Colosseum with lavish games which lasted for more than a hundred days.

=== Sources ===
Little documentary evidence of the games remains; contemporary and near-contemporary writings mostly record the major details and concentrate on the opening days. The poet Martial gives the most complete and only truly contemporary account in the form of his De Spectaculis ("On the Spectacles"), a somewhat sycophantic series of epigrams detailing the individual events of the games as an illustration of Titus' power and benevolence. Much of the work is concerned with praising Titus, and there have been difficulties with authenticating, dating and translating various portions, but Martial does give details of events not covered by other sources and the only known surviving complete record of a gladiatorial combat in the arena.

The historian Suetonius was born in about AD 70, and started writing around AD 100. He was a child at the time of the games, but it is possible that he was born and raised in Rome, so he may have witnessed the inaugural games first-hand. His De vita Caesarum (Lives of the Caesars, known also as The Twelve Caesars or Lives of the Twelve Caesars) probably completed around AD 117 to 127, includes some detail on the opening days of the games. Later in his history of Titus he reveals further information about the games. Suetonius' histories of the early Caesars have been criticised for being based on rumour and gossip rather than accurate historical sources, and he often reports from sources which contradict each other without attempting to analyse their quality or accuracy. However, he is generally regarded as a thorough scholar and has been praised for his balanced treatment of his subjects.

The only other major source of information on the games is Cassius Dio who lived in the latter second and early third centuries. His History of Rome spans 80 books written in 22 years, but much of which are only fragments. He is noted for his attention to detail in administrative affairs, but for major events his writing can be merely impressionistic, with a greater emphasis put on his interpretation of the events' significance within the wider historical context rather than reporting details. His sources are varied: he relies on many of the major commentators but also seems to have paid close attention to public records. His account of the Titus games is not sourced.

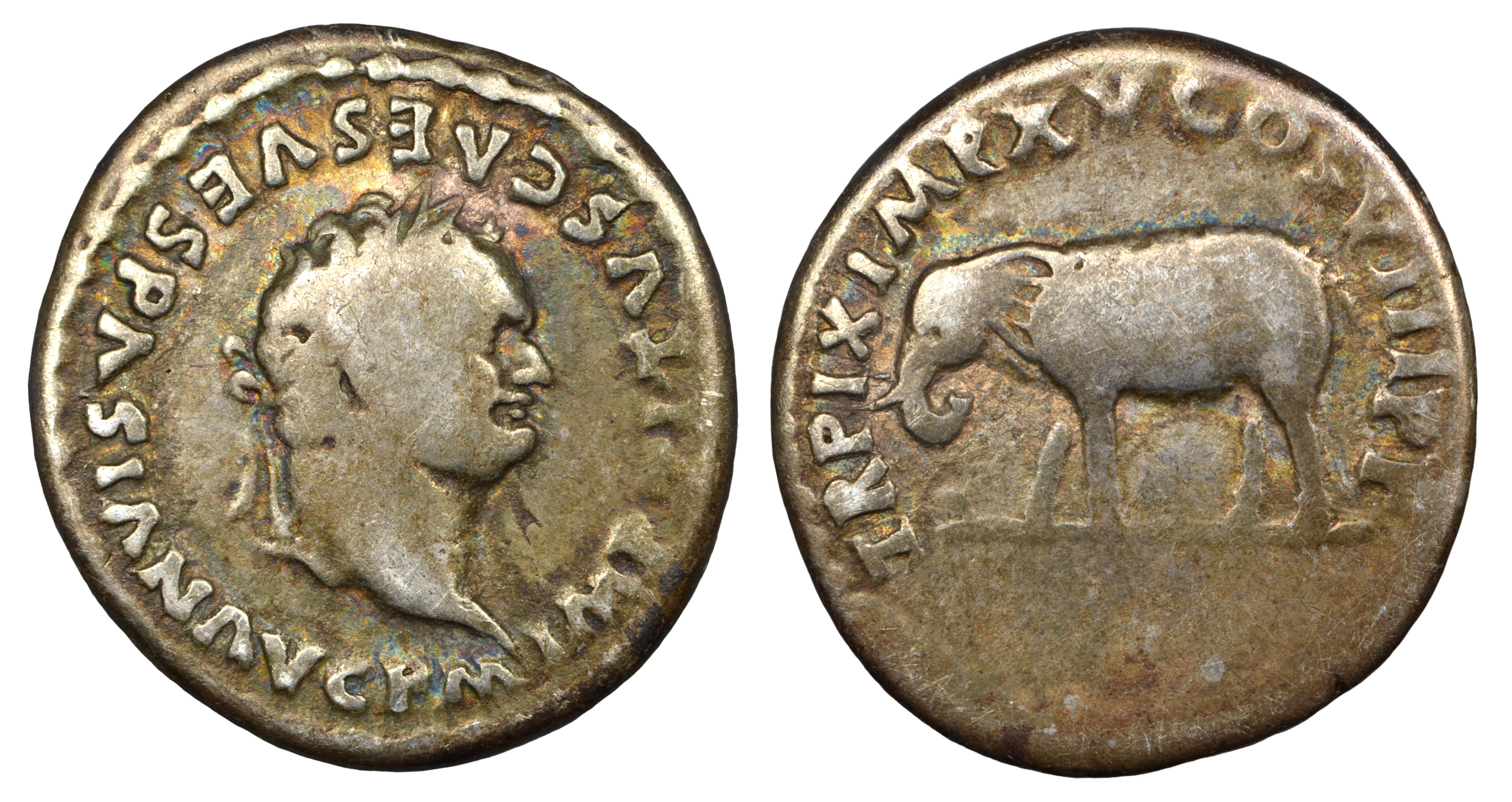
Silver denarius struck under Titus c. Jan-June AD 80, featuring an elephant. These coins were minted to commemorate the opening of the Colosseum and the inaugural games.

== Animal entertainments ==
Animal entertainments formed a central part of the games and normally took place in the morning. Dio says that over the course of the inaugural games upward of 9,000 tamed and wild animals were slain sometimes by women of no particular prominence. This conflicts with the work of Eutropius who wrote, in the later part of the fourth century, that 5,000 animals were slain during the games.

Dio and Martial record some of the animals that were exhibited. Dio notes a hunt involving cranes and another involving four elephants, and Martial mentions elephants, lions, leopards, at least one tiger, hares, pigs,^{[a]} bulls, bears, wild boar, a rhinoceros, buffalo and bison (most likely the wisent). Other exotic animals may have been used but are not mentioned; ostriches, camels and crocodiles were commonly used in the games. Giraffes are unlikely to have been featured; Julius Caesar had brought a single giraffe to Rome in 46 BC. Another is not recorded in Europe until the Medici giraffe in 1486, although they were first seen in Rome in 58 BC, and were impressive enough to be detailed in the games of Augustus and Commodus, there is no mention of hippopotami at Titus' games.

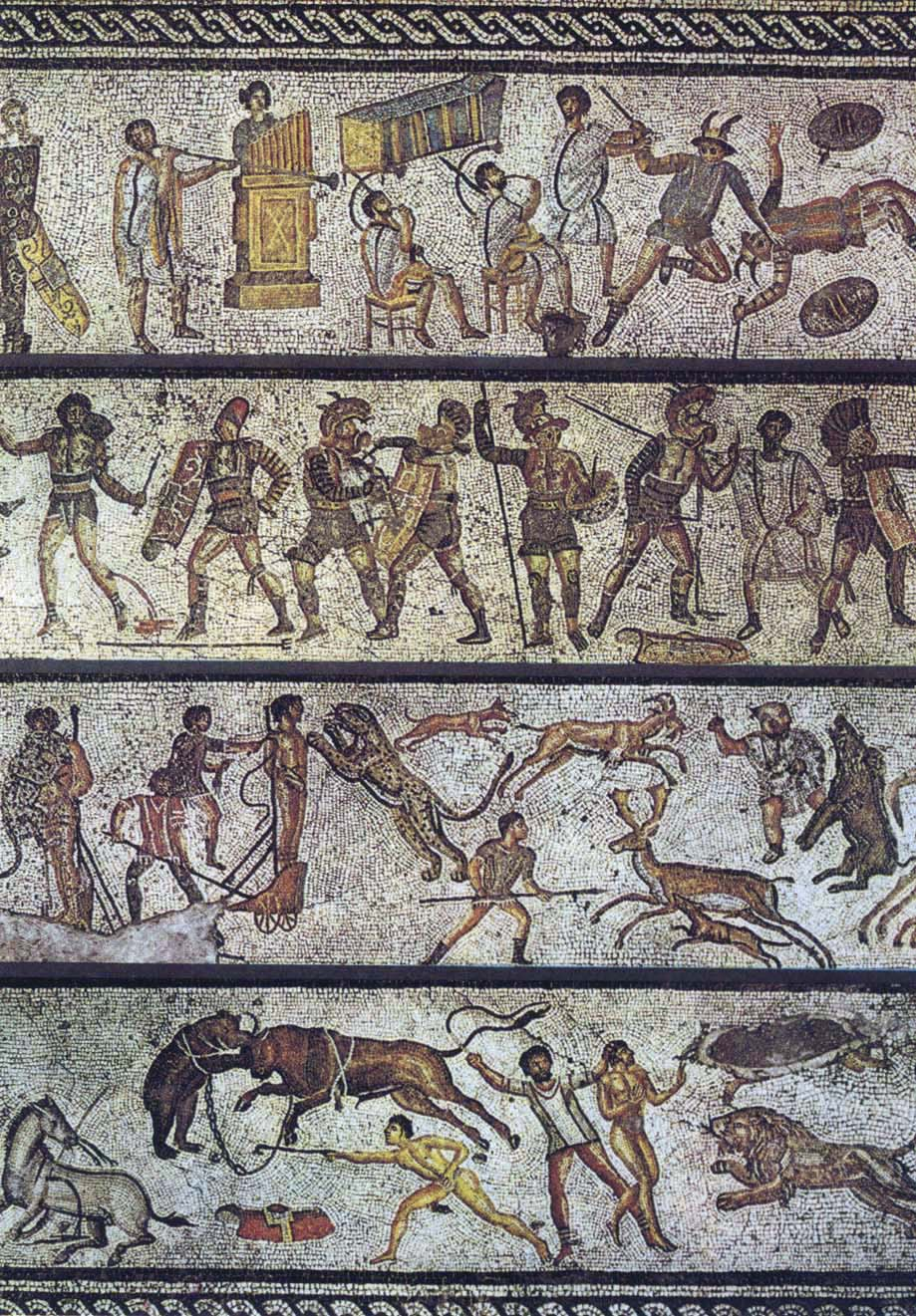
This mosaic from Dar Buc Ammera villa (Zliten) and now in Jamahiriya Museum of Tripoli, Libya, depicts some of the entertainments that would have been offered at the games.

Martial reports a contest between an elephant and a bull, and the elephant, having won, knelt before Titus. This may have formed part of its training, but Martial attributed it to a spontaneous recognition of the Emperor's power. He also mentions a bull enraged by fires in the amphitheatre being tossed around the arena before being killed by an elephant, but there is nothing to indicate that these two epigrams are about the same events or repeated many times during the span of one hundred days of celebration.

From Martial's account it appears that some of the animals were would not react in the manner expected of them for the crowds which Martial commented on as an opportunity for Titus to exhibit his command of the beasts; the lions ignored their intended prey:^{[b]}

...Caesar's lions are won over by their prey and the hare plays safely in the massive jaws.

The rhinoceros, too, proved difficult to handle. It was initially paraded around the arena, but became infuriated and attacked a bull, to the apparent delight of the crowd. Later, when it was supposed to fight, it had calmed down. Intended to face a company of men armed with spears and a host of other animals, it had to be goaded by "trembling trainers" until it would engage the other combatants:^{[c]}

...at length the fury we once knew returned. For with his double horn he tossed a heavy bear as a bull tosses dummies from his head to the stars. [With how sure a stroke does the strong hand of Carpophorus, still a youth, aim the Norcian spears!] He lifted two steers with his mobile neck, to him yielded the fierce buffalo and the bison. A panther fleeing before him ran headlong upon the spears.

Carpophorus was a skilled bestiarius, specializing in fighting animals in the arena, and is mentioned again by Martial, who compares him to Hercules and praises his abilities in dispatching a bear, a leopard and a lion of "unprecedented size". A frieze from the Temple of Vespasian and Titus (Templum Divi Vespasiani) in the Roman Forum shows events similar to those described by Martial. Two separate sets of decoration show a rhinoceros confronting a bull and a bestarius, possibly Carpophorus, with a spear, facing a lion and a leopard. Carpophorus was not the only beast slayer worthy of mention: another of Martial's epigrams refers to a woman equalling Hercules's feat of slaying the Nemean Lion.

While the trainers of the rhinoceros may have trembled in fear at the fate that awaited them if their animal failed to perform, and another trainer was savaged by his lion, some were more successful. One trainer was noted for his tigress which, though tame enough to lick his hand, had torn a lion to pieces, "a novelty unknown in any times". It also appears that the crowd was pleased when a bull (perhaps ridden by a bestarius) was hoisted aloft in the arena, but Martial gives little clue as to the nature of this entertainment.

== Executions ==
Executions were a common feature of the Roman games. They took place around midday as an interlude between the animal entertainments of the morning sessions and the gladiatorial combat in the afternoon. Although the executions were seen as symbolizing Rome's power, the higher classes normally took advantage of this interval to leave the arena to dine; the Emperor Claudius was criticised by some authors for not doing so, so it is unlikely that Titus would have watched this part of the show. The executions of deserters, prisoners-of-war, and criminals from the lower classes were normally crucifixions or damnationes ad bestias in which they would face wild animals.

Scipio Aemilianus had been the first to execute criminals in this way when he had deserters from his army exposed to wild beasts in 146 BC. These executions often took the form of the re-creation of some tragic scene from history or mythology with the criminal cast in the role of the victim killed by wild beasts. Martial records one such execution, a version of the mime Laureolus by Catullus, in which a notorious bandit was executed by crucifixion. For the games this was adapted as a version of the legend of Prometheus, who each day would have his liver devoured by an eagle. The element of crucifixion from Catullus' mime remained, but a wild bear was substituted for the eagle from the Prometheus legend:

As Prometheus, bound on a Scythian crag, fed the tireless bird with his too abundant breast, so did Laureolus, hanging on no sham cross, give his naked flesh to a Caledonian bear. His lacerated limbs lived on, dripping gore, and in all his body, body there was none. Finally he met with the punishment he deserved; the guilty wretch had plunged a sword into his father's throat or his master's, or in his madness had robbed a temple of its secret gold, or laid a cruel torch to Rome. The criminal had outdone the misdeeds of ancient story; in him, what had been a play became an execution.

Another execution was staged as a cruel twist on the story of Orpheus, who supposedly charmed the plants and flowers with his song after he lost Eurydice. In the version presented at the inaugural games, the tree and animals were charmed just as in the story, except for an "unappreciative" bear which tore the minstrel to pieces. It is likely that the harmless creatures were released first to give the impression of the story proceeding as planned before the bear was released to dispatch the unfortunate criminal forced into the role of Orpheus, whose probable restraint prevented him fleeing. Ironic reinterpretations of the myths may have been popular: in addition to Orpheus' failure to charm the beasts, Martial mentions Daedalus being torn apart by another bear, mocking him with the words "how you must wish you had your feathers now".

Martial also suggests the rape of a woman by a bull in a re-creation of the myth of Pasiphaë. Nero had provided a similar entertainment at an event he had staged using an actor dressed in the costume of a bull, though Martial claims that the act performed at the inaugural games was authentic.

== Combat, hunting and racing ==
Dio, Suetonius and Martial all record naumachiae, the commonly used Greek term for what the Romans also called navalia proelia, re-creations of famous sea battles. While Dio claims that both the purpose-built naumachia of Augustus and the amphitheatre itself were flooded for two separate shows, Suetonius states only that the event took place on the old artificial lake (which would have been that of Augustus). Martial does not specify where the naumachiae took place, but he is clear that whatever location he is discussing could be flooded and drained at will:

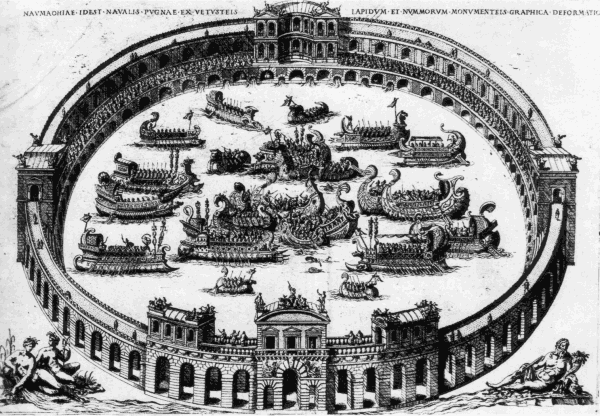
Naumachiae may have taken place in the amphitheatre, but staging them would have presented many technical difficulties.

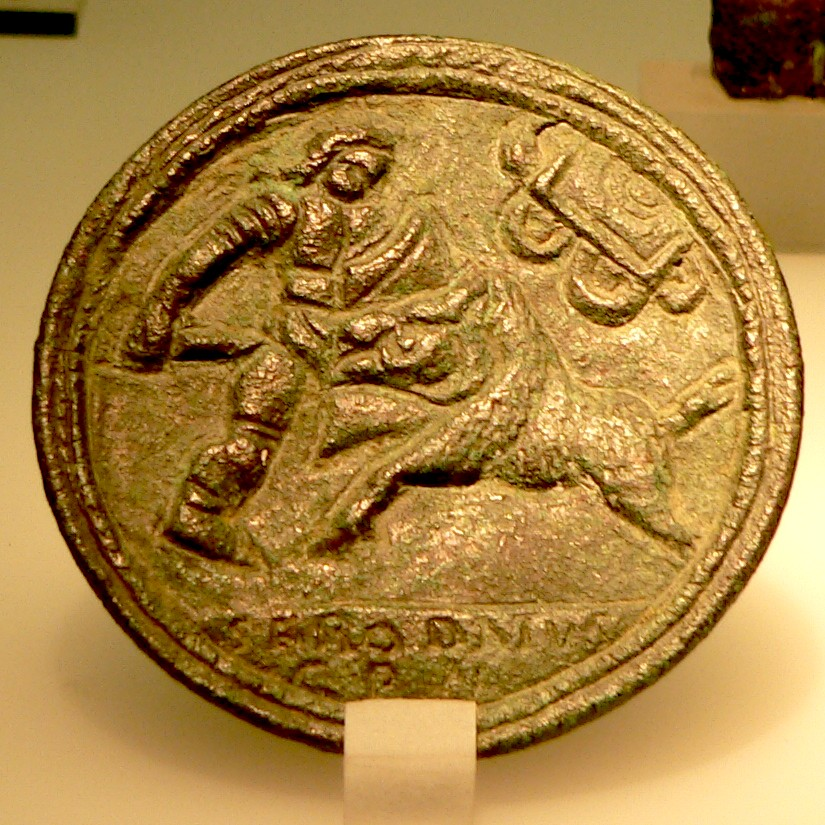
A depiction of the venatio on a bronze medallion; a hunter confronts a boar.

If you are here from a distant land, a late spectator for whom this was the first day of the sacred show, let not the naval warfare deceive you with its ships, and the water like to a sea: here but lately was land. Don't you believe it? Watch while the waters weary Mars. But a short while hence you will be saying "But here lately was sea."

It appears it would have been difficult to flood the amphitheatre, but, because few records survive on the operation of the Colosseum, it is impossible to say for certain where the naval battles took place. Suetonius writes that Titus' brother and successor, Domitian, staged sea-fights in the amphitheatre, but he had made alterations to the structure, which probably included adding the hypogeum—a complex of underground passages that may have allowed the arena to be quickly flooded and emptied. While Suetonius only records that Titus' recreations of naval battles took place, Dio gives some details:

For Titus suddenly filled this same theatre with water and brought in horses and bulls and some other domesticated animals that had been taught to behave in the liquid element just as on land. He also brought in people on ships, who engaged in a sea-fight there, impersonating the Corcyreans and Corinthians; and others gave a similar exhibition outside the city in the grove of Gaius and Lucius, a place which Augustus had once excavated for this very purpose.

Both Dio and Suetonius agree that gladiatorial contests and a wild-beast hunt, the venatio, also took place at the lake area, but they again disagree on the details. Dio states this took place on the first day, with the lake covered over with planking and wooden stands erected around it, while Suetonius says the events occurred in the basin after the water had been let out. Suetonius writes that 5,000 animals were killed there in a single day. Although no record of the animals pursued in these hunts survives (Dio mentions hunts of cranes and elephants but does not give a location), larger exotic animals were popular, notably elephants, big cats and bears, though smaller game such as birds, rabbits and goats also featured.

Suetonius writes that when Domitian staged his games there were other entertainments aside from the "usual two-horse chariot races", which indicates these races probably formed part of Titus' games, and Dio tells us that there was a horse race on the second day though he gives no details of the type of race.

Only Dio's record extends to detail of the third day specifically, during which he says:

…there was a naval battle between three thousand men, followed by an infantry battle. The "Athenians" conquered the "Syracusans" (these were the names the combatants used), made a landing on the islet and assaulted and captured a wall that had been constructed around the monument.

This may again suggest the amphitheatre was flooded, as the monument referred to could be an altar of Diana, or Pluto, or of Jupiter Latiaris that may have been present in the centre of the arena, but Pliny the Elder mentions a bridge in connection with the lake of Augustus, suggesting there may have been an island there as well.

== Verus and Priscus ==
Details of most of the gladiatorial combats are not recorded. Suetonius writes that they were lavish and Dio that there were both single combats and fights between groups. One fight, between the gladiators Verus and Priscus, was recorded by Martial:

While Priscus continued to draw out the contest, and Verus likewise, and for a long time the struggle was evenly balanced on both sides, discharge was demanded for the stout fighters with loud and frequent shouting; but Caesar obeyed his own law (the law was that once the palm had been set up the fight had to proceed until a finger was raised): he did as he was allowed, making frequent awards of plate. Still, a resolution was found for the contest, equal they fought, equal they yielded. To both Caesar awarded the wooden sword and the palm: thus courage and skill received their reward. This has happened under no emperor but you, Caesar: two men fought and two men won.

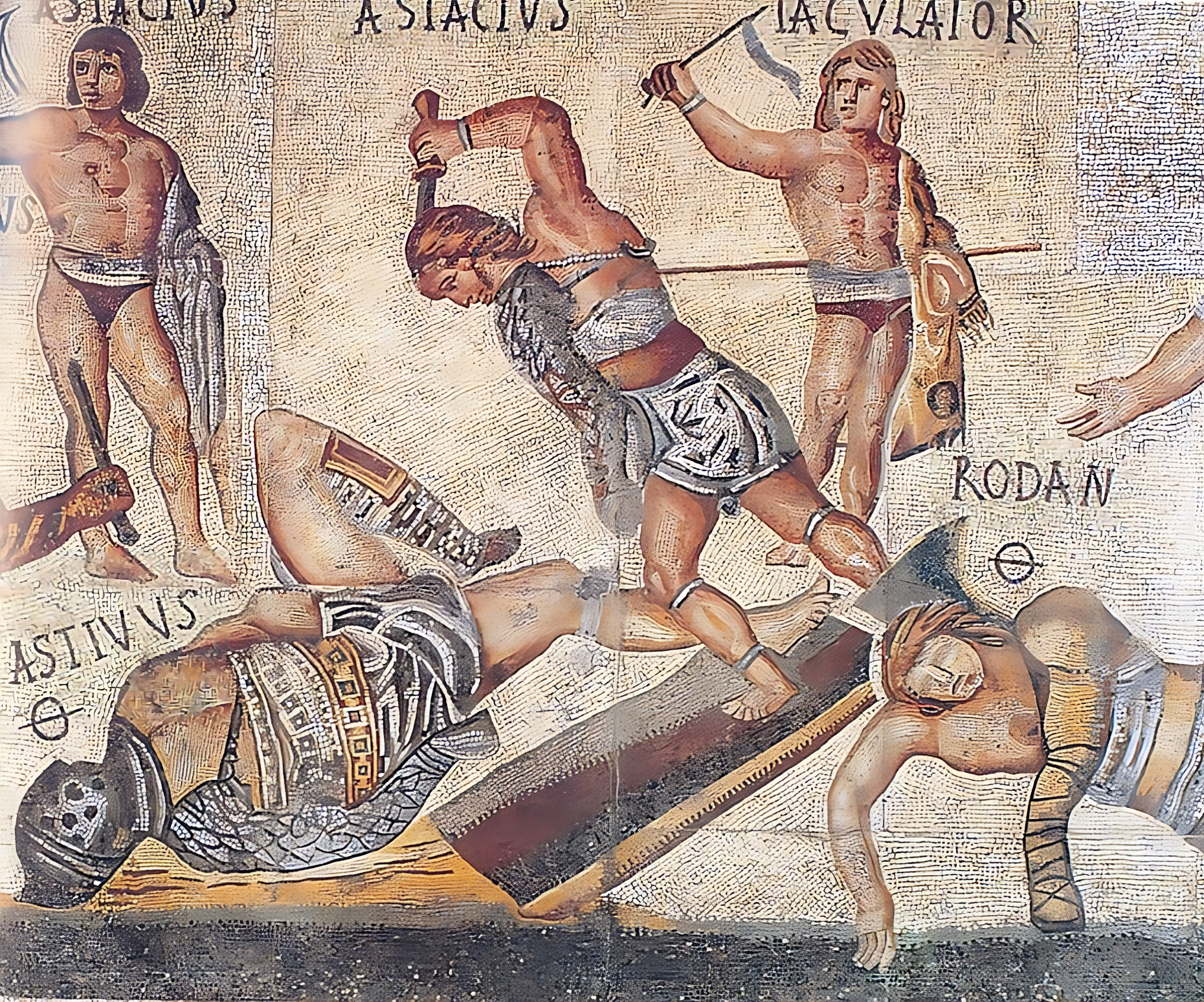
Detail of the Borghese Gladiator Mosaic, ca. 320.

As usual, the tone of the epigram is somewhat fawning toward his patron, Titus, but it gives more detail than any other account of the games. It seems to imply that a draw was uncommon in gladiatorial combat at this level, but that Titus eventually yielded to the wishes of the crowd, declared the match equal, and granted both men their freedom (with the traditional presentation of the wooden sword). The traditional way of acknowledging defeat was for the yielding gladiator to raise a finger (ad digitum), and it is possible that in this case both men raised their fingers, but Martial's emphasis here is on Titus' even-handedness and generosity in granting a reprieve (missio) to the crowd's two favourites. His reference to this only happening under Titus probably alludes to the declaration of both as victors, as there is evidence that neither ties nor the survival of both gladiators in a contest were uncommon: it was expensive to train and keep a gladiator and they were not dispatched lightly. There is some evidence for the existence of both Priscus and Verus, at least as names of gladiators, outside of Martial's account. A first-century graveyard in Smyrna contains the grave of a gladiator named Priscus, and Verus' name is etched on a marble slab from Ferentinum, recording a gladiatorial contest. The details of Verus' fights are unfortunately not legible. While neither of these may be the Priscus and Verus mentioned by Martial they do attest to the use of these names by gladiators.

Martial's mention of gift-giving is repeated in the account by Dio, who says that Titus would throw wooden balls into the crowd from his seat in the box at the north end of the arena. These balls were inscribed with a description of a gift, either food, clothing, slaves, pack animals, horse, cattle, or gold or silver vessels. Anybody who caught one could hand over the ball to an official who would provide the named gift in return. This was not unusual: Suetonius mentions that Nero did the same, giving 1,000 birds daily, as well as food parcels, and vouchers for various extravagant gifts.

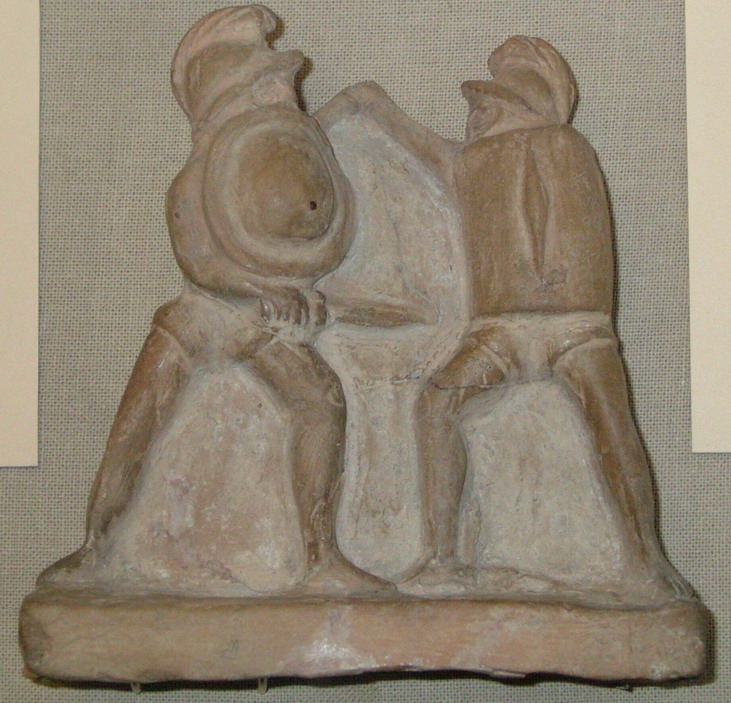
Pottery fragment depicting the Thraex or Thracian gladiator (right), fighting a hoplomachus.

== Later events ==
Some of Suetonius' other comments on Titus' reign mention the baths and events in the amphitheatre. Since Titus did not survive long after the end of the opening games, it is likely that these events took place during the days of the inauguration. Suetonius says that Titus promised for one day to forgo his own preferences and allow the crowd to decide the fate of the gladiators competing in the arena. He admired the Thracian gladiators,^{[d]} and while arguing passionately with the crowd on the subject, did not let his preferences sway him from his promise. He had some informers and their managers whipped and paraded in the arena. Some were sold as slaves in an auction and others sent away to "the most forbidding islands".

Suetonius also records that Titus invited some senators, whom he had pardoned for plotting against him, to sit with him during one of the days of the games, and to inspect the swords of the gladiators, a statement that is reinforced to some degree by Dio who remarks that Titus had no senators put to death during his reign.

On the last day of the games, Titus wept openly in view of the public in the amphitheatre. According to Dio, Titus died the following day, after officially dedicating the amphitheatre and the baths. Suetonius says that he had set out for the Sabine territories after the games but collapsed and died at the first posting station.

== Notes ==
a. In Epigram 14 (12) Martial says that a pregnant sow was speared through the stomach and a live piglet emerged.

b. In Epigram 33 Martial repeats his claim that the animals obey the Emperor. When a doe being chased by Molosian hounds kneels in front of him and is not attacked by the pursuing dogs, Martial says she and the dogs can sense Caesar's aura of power. Unfortunately the date of this epigram is in doubt, so "Caesar" could refer to either Titus or Domitian.

c. The mention of a "double horn" confirms that the rhinoceros was one of the African species: the White Rhinoceros or the Black Rhinoceros.

d. The gladiators were described by their weaponry rather than their nationality, thus the "Thracian" gladiators that Titus admired may not have been from Thrace. Thracian gladiators carried small round shields and curved daggers.
