= Pompeii: The Last Day =

- Title screenshot
- Genre: Docudrama
- Written by: Edward Canfor-Dumas
- Directed by: Peter Nicholson
- Starring: Tim Pigott-Smith; Jonathan Firth; Jim Carter
- Narrated by: Alisdair Simpson; F. Murray Abraham
- Composer: Ty Unwin
- Country of origin: United Kingdom
- Original language: English

Production
- Executive producer: Michael Mosley
- Producer: Ailsa Orr
- Running time: 51 minutes

Original release
- Network: BBC One
- Release: 20 October 2003

Related
- Pyramid; Colosseum: Rome's Arena of Death

Pompeii: The Last Day is a 2003 dramatized documentary that tells of the eruption of Mount Vesuvius towards the end of August 79 CE. This eruption covered the ancient Roman cities of Pompeii and Herculaneum in ash and pumice, killing a large number of people trapped between the volcano and the sea. The documentary, which portrays the different phases of the eruption, was directed by Peter Nicholson and written by Edward Canfor-Dumas.

== Production ==
The film is directed and produced by the BBC in co-production with TLC.

== Awards ==
- Winner: sound supervisor Simon Farmer won the 2005 Primetime Emmy Award for Outstanding Sound Editing for Nonfiction Programming (Single or Multi-Camera) for this production.
- Nominations: BAFTA 2004 nominations for Flaherty and RT Audience
- Winner: BBC Factual Audience Award
- Winner: RTS Education Award

This was the highest rated specialist factual programme of the year with an audience of 10.3 million and a 40% share.

== Plot ==
The documentary tells the story of the eruption of Mount Vesuvius from the point of view of assorted inhabitants of Pompeii and Herculaneum whose names and occupations are known, including a local politician and his family, a fuller, his wife, and two gladiators. Historical characters include Pliny the Elder and his nephew Pliny the Younger. It draws heavily on the eyewitness account of Pliny the Younger, as well as historical research and recent discoveries in volcanology. Extensive CGI was used to recreate the effects of the eruption.

=== Death throes ===
Most of the people who were in Pompeii when the fourth pyroclastic surge hit either died instantly or slowly suffocated to death.

- The death throes of those in the family of Julius Polybius are based upon the 1975 discovery of the skeleton of a heavily pregnant girl (Julia) surrounded by her family, in the actual House of Julius Polybius. Julia's husband, Sabinus, is shown to have most likely poisoned himself and presumably was the skeleton lying near the foot of the bed Julia's body was found on, along with the bones of her fetus.
- The death of Stephanus the Fuller is based upon a cast found of a man in the fetal position (the cast is locked up in an onsite warehouse for safekeeping).
- The death of Stephanus' wife, Fortunata, is based upon the discovery of the body of a rich bejeweled lady in the gladiator barracks, alongside those of gladiators.
- In Herculaneum, the death throes are much simpler, as most people were found during excavations either on the beach or inside the boat houses. Additionally, unlike Pompeii, when the pyroclastic surges hit Herculaneum, people there were instantly killed, whereas most Pompeians slowly suffocated, although some died instantly.

== Cast ==
Actor	Name	Description
Jim Carter	Julius Polybius	A wealthy Pompeiian, husband of Epidia and father of Julia.
Chrissie Cotterill	Epidia	A wealthy Pompeiian, wife of Polybius and mother of Julia.
Katherine Whitburn	Julia	Daughter of Polybius and Epidia, wife of Sabinus; 7 months pregnant.
Leigh Jones	Sabinus	Husband of Julia.
George Yiasoumi	Felix	Slave to Polybius; has a wife and two sons.
Jonathan Firth	Stephanus	A wealthy Pompeiian, owner of a fullery. Married to Fortunata.
Rebecca Clarke	Fortunata	Married to Stephanus.
Inika Leigh Wright	Hedone	Slave and lover to Stephanus.
Neji Nejah	Restitutus	Slave to Stephanus.
Robert Whitelock	Celadus the Thracian	Pompeiian gladiator, friend to Africanus.
Chad Shepherd	Africanus	Pompeiian gladiator, friend to Celadus
Tim Pigott-Smith	Gaius Plinius Secundus	Roman Navy Commander. Brother to Plinia and uncle to Pliny the Younger.
Martin Hodgson	Gaius Plinius Caecilius	Nephew to Pliny the Elder and son to Plinia.
Rachel Atkins	Plinia Marcella	Sister to Pliny the Elder and mother to Pliny the Younger.
Tony Amendola	Pomponianus	Friend of Pliny the Elder. Lived in Stabiae.
Emily Canfor-Dumas	Slave girl	Slave from Herculaneum.
Omar Berdouni	Callistus	Pompeiian working for Polybius. Father to seven-year old Claudia.
