= Building the Great Pyramid =

2002 British television documentary film

- BBC DVD Cover
- Also known as: Pyramid
- Genre: Documentary
- Written by: Jonathan Stamp; Steven Manuel
- Directed by: Jonathan Stamp
- Starring: Hisham Abdullah; Mohamed Awad
- Voices of: Omar Sharif (Nakht - original); Abdullah Mahmoud (Younger Nakht - original); Hisham Abdullah (Deba - original); Mohamed Awad (Kaem-ah - original); Christian Brückner
- Narrated by: Michael Pennington (original); Tom Hewitt; Marc Bator
- Composers: Jonathan Cooper; Martyn Swain
- Country of origin: United Kingdom
- Original language: English

Production
- Executive producer: Steven Manuel
- Running time: 60 minutes

Original release
- Network: BBC One
- Release: 28 October 2002

Related
- Colosseum: Rome's Arena of Death; Pompeii: The Last Day

Pyramid aka Building the Great Pyramid is a 2002 BBC Television documentary film which tells the story of the building of the Great Pyramid at Giza through the commentary of the fictional builder, Nakht.

== Production ==
The film was produced by the BBC in co-production with the Discovery Channel and NDR.

== Awards ==
- Primetime Emmy Award 2003
  - Outstanding Special Visual Effects for a Miniseries, Movie or Special
- International Emmy Awards 2004
  - Nominated: Outstanding Special Visual Effects for a Miniseries, Movie or a Special

== Media information ==
=== DVD release ===
- Released on Region 2 DVD as a bonus disc with Egypt.

=== Companion book ===
- Jackson, Kevin; & Jonathan Stamp (10 October 2002). Pyramid. BBC Books (hardcover). ISBN 978-0-563-48803-3.
- Jackson, Kevin; & Jonathan Stamp (1 February 2003). Building the Great Pyramid. Firefly Books (paperbook). ISBN 978-1-55297-719-4.
