= Verus (gladiator) =

Roman gladiator

Verus was a well-known gladiator during the reigns of the Emperors Vespasian and Titus in the later part of the 1st century. His combat with Priscus was the highlight of the opening day of the games conducted by Titus to inaugurate the Flavian Amphitheatre (later the Colosseum) in AD 80, and recorded in a laudatory poem by Martial — the only detailed description of a gladiatorial fight that has survived to the present day. Both gladiators were declared victors of the combat, and were awarded their freedom by the Emperor in a unique outcome.

Martial, Liber de Spectaculis, XXIX:

As Priscus and Verus each lengthened the contest, And for a long time the battle was equal on each side, Repeatedly loud shouts petitioned for the men to be released; But Titus followed his own law; — It was the law to fight with a shield until a finger was raised: — He did what was allowed, often gave dishes and gifts. But an end was found to the equal division: Equals to fight, equals to yield. Titus sent wooden swords to both and palms to both: Thus skillful courage received its prize. This took place under no prince except you, Titus: When two fought, both were the victor.	Cum traheret Priscus, traheret certamina Verus, esset et aequalis Mars utriusque diu, missio saepe uiris magno clamore petita est; sed Titus legi paruit ipse suae; — lex erat, ad digitum posita concurrere parma: — quod licuit, lances donaque saepe dedit. Inuentus tamen est finis discriminis aequi: pugnauere pares, subcubuere pares. Misit utrique rudes et palmas Caesar utrique: hoc pretium uirtus ingeniosa tulit. Contigit hoc nullo nisi te sub principe, Titus: cum duo pugnarent, uictor uterque fuit.

== Notes ==
- The life and fate of Verus is the basis of the BBC documentary drama "Colosseum: Rome's Arena of Death" a.k.a. "Colosseum: A Gladiator's Story" (2003).
