= Edward Canfor-Dumas =

Edward Canfor-Dumas (born 1957) is a novelist and an award-winning TV scriptwriter – and a specialist in conflict management.

After winning a scholarship to Latymer Upper School, Hammersmith, he read English Literature at New College, Oxford. After a period as a comedy writer and performer he started penning scripts for popular television series such as The Bill and Kavanagh QC. His first major feature-length programme was Tough Love, a powerful drama about police corruption, starring Ray Winstone. He then wrote the drama for the highly acclaimed BBC drama-documentary Pompeii: The Last Day, which was nominated for a BAFTA, and followed this in 2005 with Supervolcano.

He branched out into novels in the same year, with the successful modern story The Buddha, Geoff and Me, which he followed in 2014 with Bodhisattva Blues. Both books have Buddhist themes, as does The Buddha in Daily Life (1988), which he ghostwrote for Richard Causton.

In 2006 Edward took a lead role in establishing the All-Party Parliamentary Group on Conflict Issues, which he ran until 2016. Between 2013 and 2017 he co-led a multinational civil-military project – Understand to Prevent – which developed guidance on an expanded role for the military in the prevention of violent conflict, and was a member of the Strategy Forum of the UK's Chief of the Defence Staff 2014–17.

Another book followed in 2018,The Talking Revolution, written with Peter Osborn. The message of the book can be summed up in six words: 'Better Conversations, Better Relationships, Better Lives'.

He lives with his wife, Coralyn, in Hertfordshire near London, and has a son and a daughter, Alexander and Emily.
