= The Victory of Faith (painting) =

Oil painting by Saint George Hare

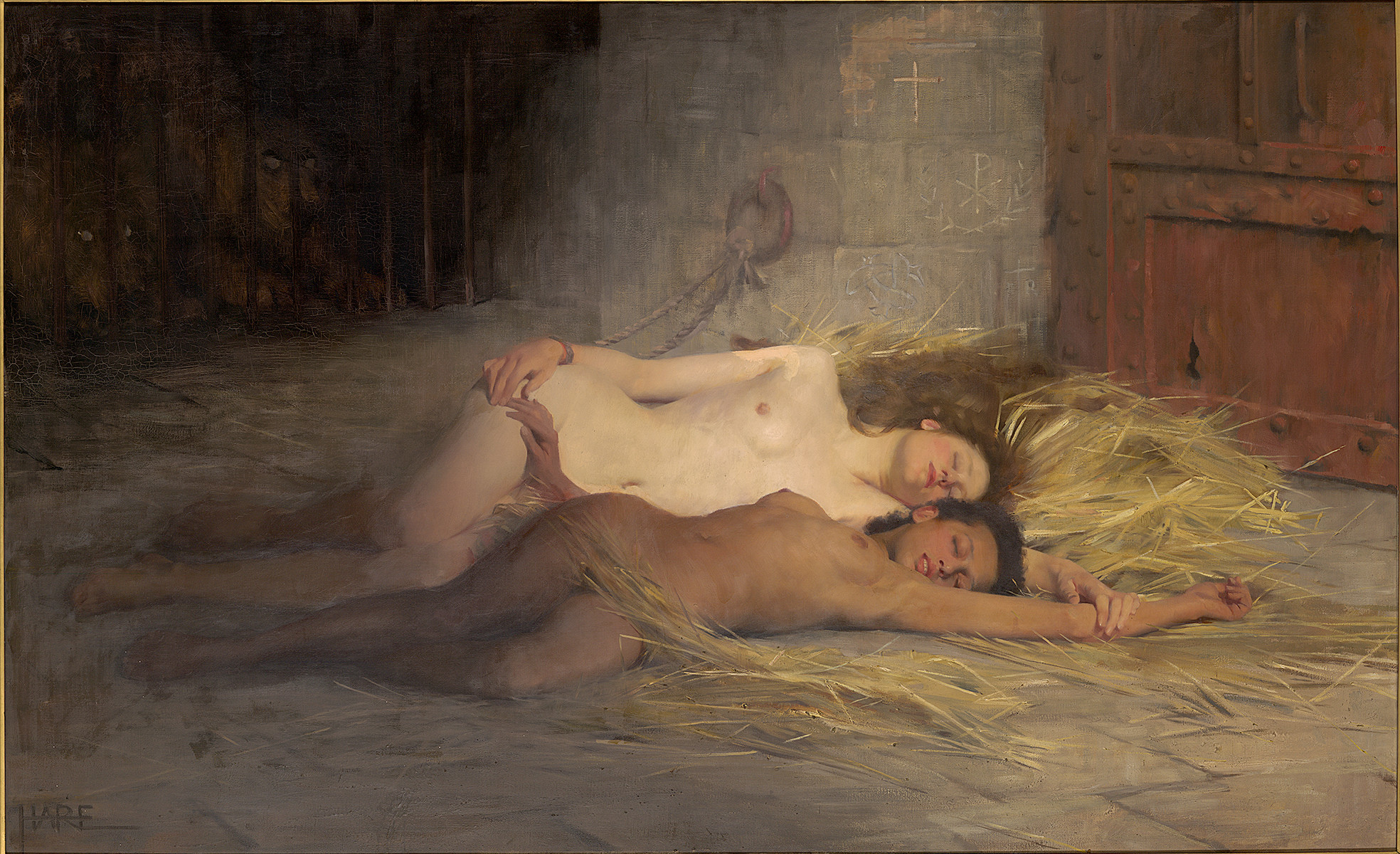
- Artist: Saint George Hare
- Year: 1891
- Medium: Oil on canvas
- Dimensions: 123.3 cm × 200 cm (48.5 in × 79 in)
- Location: National Gallery of Victoria, Melbourne
- Accession: 201-2
- Website: www.ngv.vic.gov.au/explore/collection/work/4011/

The Victory of Faith is an oil on canvas painting by Irish artist Saint George Hare that was completed in 1891. (Note: 1891 is cited by most sources, but the National Gallery of Victoria where the painting is held also gives 1890 as a possibility.) It is now in the National Gallery of Victoria, Melbourne, Australia. It depicts two sleeping nude women, one shackled, apparently intended as Christian martyrs sentenced to death by beasts.

The Victory of Faith is one of several paintings by Hare showing shackled and under-dressed women, another notable example being The Gilded Cage. A contemporary article in The Homiletic Review called it an "impressive depiction of Christian faith and steadfastness" and described the two women to be in a "sisterly embrace": A modern interpretation by Kobena Mercer named the work as an example of an interracial lesbian couple, likening it to Les Amies by Jules Robert Auguste.

The Victory of Faith was exhibited at the Royal Academy Summer Exhibition of 1891 and at the World's Columbian Exposition in 1893. It is currently at the National Gallery of Victoria in Melbourne, having been donated to the gallery in 1905.
