= The Gilded Cage (Hare) =

Painting by Saint George Hare

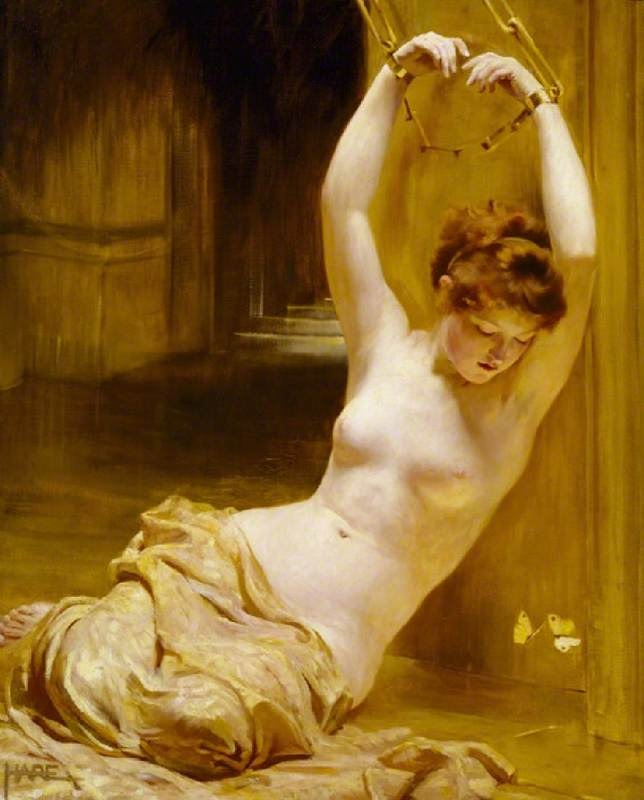
- Artist: Saint George Hare
- Year: 1908
- Medium: Oil on canvas
- Dimensions: 127 cm × 101.5 cm (50 in × 40.0 in)
- Location: Stourhead

The Gilded Cage is an oil painting of 1908 by the Irish artist Saint George Hare, one of several of his shackled female images including his more famous The Victory of Faith.

It depicts a lone, sleeping woman shackled by the wrists to a column while butterflies fly past. Its title may have been inspired by the 1900 song "A Bird in a Gilded Cage" and the painting may have symbolic meaning.

According to the National Gallery of Victoria in Australia, "The depiction of naked women in chains seemed to hold a special interest for Hare, and he returned to the subject frequently".

Late Victorian-era codes of morality made displaying purely erotic art difficult, but some artists would skirt the line. The woman here is presumably being held captive and therefore her nudity is not her fault or choice, she is a victim of an unseen captor, making her nudity more acceptable i.e. it is not outright pornographic; there is room for plausible deniability. The classical setting and clothing also help, another common artistic strategy for this type of pseudo-erotic artwork.

== See also ==
- The Greek Slave, a marble sculpture by Hiram Powers depicting similar subject matter
