= Rob Harvey (special effects artist) =

Visual effects artist

- Occupation: Visual effects artist
- Years active: 1998-present

Rob Harvey is a visual effects artist who has done visuals on period adventure films such as Gladiator, Troy and Clash of the Titans.

He won an Academy Award at the 73rd Academy Awards in the category of Best Visual Effects for his work on Gladiator. His Oscar was shared with John Nelson, Neil Corbould and Tim Burke.

== Selected filmography ==
- The Bible (2013)
- Clash of the Titans (2010)
- Supervolcano (2005)
- Troy (2004)
- Gladiator (2000)
