= Saint George Hare =

Irish painter (1857–1933)

Saint George Hare RI ROI
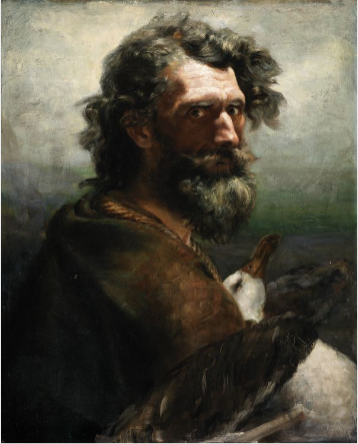
- Self-portrait as the ancient mariner
- Born: 5 July 1857; Limerick, Ireland
- Died: 30 January 1933 (aged 75); London, United Kingdom
- Education: Limerick School of Art
- Notable work: Death of William the Conqueror; The Victory of Faith; Yesterdays; The Gilded Cage
- Patrons: Sir Henry Hugh Arthur Hoare, 6th Baronet

Saint George Hare or St George Hare RI ROI (5 July 1857 – 30 January 1933) was an Irish painter.

== Early life and family ==
He was the son of George Frederick Hare, a dentist from Ipswich, and his wife, Ella, from County Wexford. Hare's grandfather and uncle, both called Jabez Hare, were also artists. His uncle died age 17 and is commemorated in St Matthew's Church, Ipswich.

Hare was formally educated in art in Limerick School of Art, where he spent three years under the tutelage of Nicholas Brophy. In 1875, he received a scholarship and moved to London to study for seven years at the National Art Training School, South Kensington.

== Career ==
He exhibited with the Royal Hibernian Academy (RHA) for the first time in 1881. He began exhibiting with the Royal Academy in 1884, going on to win a gold medal for his history painting "Death of William the Conqueror," which was exhibited in 1886. He supplemented his income from painting with teaching, but stopped to concentrate on his own artistic career.

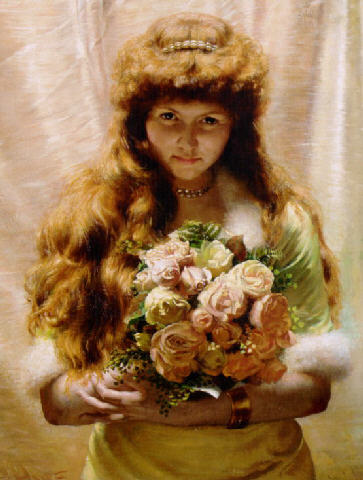
An English Rose by Saint George Hare

In 1891, he was a founding member of the Chelsea Arts Club. He was an elected member of both the Royal Institute of Painters in Water Colours and the Royal Institute of Oil Painters. Sir Hugh Lane included his work in the London Guildhall exhibition of Irish painters in 1906 and his work was also exhibited regularly at the Walker Gallery, Liverpool and the Manchester City Art Gallery.

Anne Crookshank and the Knight of Glin commented in 1994 that on Hare "It is extremely rare in Ireland till the twentieth century to find the use of the nude as a subject. We have no Ettys, we have no Leightons with the startling exception of one academic painter from Limerick." While they acknowledge these works they also note that he also painted "fluffy Edwardian 'keepsake beauties'".

Hare lived most of his life in Chelsea, and was one of the founding members of the Chelsea Arts Club in 1891. In 1892, he was elected a member of the Royal Institute of Painters in Water Colours, and the Royal Institute of Oil Painters, exhibiting frequently with both. In 1893, he drew illustrations for a story by William Outram Tristram published in The Graphic. In 1904, his work was shown as part of an exhibition of Irish painters organised by Hugh Lane. He also exhibited with the Walker Gallery, Manchester City Art Gallery and the Royal Society of Artists, Birmingham.

He was sponsored by Sir Henry Hugh Arthur Hoare, 6th Baronet and produced several portraits of the Hoare family. His most notable works are the aforementioned Death of William the Conqueror (1886), The Victory of Faith (1890 or 1891), Yesterdays (1894), and The Gilded Cage (1908).

== Death and legacy ==
He married and had one child. Hare died in London in hospital on 30 January 1933.

A large collection of his paintings are held by the National Trust.
