= Laureolus =

Roman runaway slave, highwayman, and bandit leader

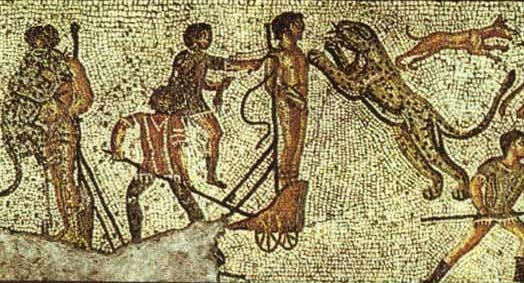
Damnatio ad bestias, the method of capital punishment Laureolus was subjected to (Zliten mosaic, c. 2nd century)

Laureolus (died before AD 41) was a purported runaway slave, highwayman, and bandit leader of the Roman Empire who was noted for his ability to evade authorities. According to the poet Martial in his Book of Spectacles, Laureolus was captured, crucified, and condemned to damnatio ad bestias.

== Laureolus-mime ==
In or before the first century AD, a Roman mimographer named Catullus (Note: T. P. Wiseman identifies him as being Gaius Valerius Catullus, but this remains speculative.) wrote a play titled Laureolus, based on the historical individual. In its final act, the man playing Laureolus would be swapped out with a criminal, who was then crucified and condemned to beasts before the audience. This play was one of the most popular in Rome until at least the second century.

The earliest known instance of the play took place on the morning of Caligula's assassination in AD 41. Suetonius considered Laureolus to be a bad omen and mentioned a performance in which the man playing Laureolus and several other actors vomited blood, which engulfed the stage.

The Classical Association of the Middle West and South has interpreted the play's longevity as having been a means to discourage insubordination among the Roman population. They also suggested that Laureolus may have had a "stature as a folk hero to the disenfranchised in Roman society".

== Cited works ==
- Coleman, Kathleen M. (2006). Martial: Liber Spectaculorum. New York City: Oxford University Press. ISBN 0-19-814481-4.
- Wiseman, T. P. (1985). Catullus & His World: A Reappraisal (Hardcover ed.). Cambridge, Massachusetts: Cambridge University Press. ISBN 0-521-26606-8.
