= Supervolcano (film) =

2005 television film directed by Tony Mitchell

- DVD cover
- Written by: Edward Canfor-Dumas
- Directed by: Tony Mitchell
- Starring: Michael Riley; Gary Lewis; Shaun Johnston; Adrian Holmes; Jennifer Copping; Rebecca Jenkins; Tom McBeath; Robert Wisden; Susan Duerden; Jane McLean; Sam Charles; Kevin McNulty
- Composer: Ty Unwin
- Countries of origin: United Kingdom; Canada
- Original language: English

Production
- Executive producer: Michael Mosley
- Producer: Ailsa Orr
- Cinematography: Derek Rogers
- Editor: Mark Gravil
- Running time: 121 minutes
- Production companies: BBC; Discovery Channel; ProSieben; Mediaset; NHK
- Budget: $3.7 million (USD)

Original release
- Network: BBC One
- Release: 13 March 2005

Related
- Supervolcano: The Truth About Yellowstone

Supervolcano is a 2005 disaster drama television film directed by Tony Mitchell and written by Edward Canfor-Dumas. It is based on the speculated and potential eruption of the volcanic Yellowstone Caldera, located in Yellowstone National Park. The film stars an ensemble cast consisting of Michael Riley, Gary Lewis, Shaun Johnston, Adrian Holmes, Jennifer Copping, Rebecca Jenkins, Tom McBeath, Robert Wisden, Susan Duerden, Jane McLean, Sam Charles, and Kevin McNulty.

Supervolcano premiered on BBC One in the United Kingdom on 13 March 2005, before airing on Discovery Channel in Canada and the United States on 10 April 2005. The film was nominated for a Primetime Emmy Award and a BAFTA Award for its visual effects.

== Plot ==
Richard Lieberman, the scientist in charge at Yellowstone Volcano Observatory, gives a press conference with his colleagues Jock Galvin, Dave, Matt and Nancy, and their boss, Michael Eldridge, to present their new virtual imagery simulator VIRGIL, which Eldridge claims will greatly aid in their research. Reporter Maggie Chin asks about the possibility of an eruption, which Rick dismisses as a remote possibility.

After an earthquake triggers a tsunami on one of the park's lakes, Maggie interviews Kenneth "Ken" Wylie on TV about his new book on volcanoes. Rick and Ken are brothers-in-law. The two later argue, with Rick accusing Ken of creating a mass panic to sell his book.

The undersecretary of FEMA, Wendy Reiss, eventually asks Rick about the worst-case scenario if Yellowstone does release a "super eruption". He shows her a simulation, revealing the devastating results of an ashfall across the US if the volcano were to ever erupt.

After a hydrothermal event at the Norris Geyser Basin and more questions from the press, Rick's team runs a simulation of possible eruptions on VIRGIL. They learn that even a moderate eruption could potentially destabilize the rest of the magma chamber under Yellowstone and trigger a super eruption.

After more seismic events, the park is closed. Maggie comes to Yellowstone anyway, and Rick sends Matt to give her a tour of the park. They discover a harmonic tremor near Norris, indicating that an eruption of unknown scale is imminent.

An email about the expected eruption leaks to the press, causing a national panic. FEMA schedules a press conference in Washington, DC, at which Rick is pressured into saying that the eruption will not be large.

While Rick is flying back from the conference, his colleagues in the field office finish plugging in the latest data for the eruption. They discover that the top of the magma chamber alone has more than enough eruptible magma to destabilize the chamber and trigger a super eruption. As they realize this, the volcano erupts, severely damaging their field office and injuring Jock. Matt investigates the eruption and contacts Dave about it to inform Rick. A pyroclastic flow forces the team to abandon the main USGS office and flee; Jock flees in the helicopter while Nancy and Matt use their truck, but the flow outpaces and kills them both.

Rick contacts Dave, another team member who left before the eruption to set up a backup office in a hotel in Bozeman. Meanwhile, the vent is blowing ash east across the US and across major commercial air routes, prompting FEMA to clear American airspace and take other protective measures. Rick's plane flies into the ash cloud, damaging the engines, and they make an emergency landing in Cheyenne. Rick and Ken decide to go to the FEMA office in Denver but are caught under the ashfall and decide to look for a nearby military installation instead.

The motel roof collapses due to heavy ashfall after more caldera vents open, destroying the backup office and killing Dave. Rick and Ken reach the military installation safely. Weathering the eruption inside the installation, Rick contacts FEMA and determines that the vents will merge into one massive caldera in an eruption on the scale of the Huckleberry Ridge Eruption, the largest in Yellowstone's history.

Government officials try to design a plan to save the 25 million people trapped by the ashfall, but Rick convinces them that they cannot possibly hope to do so; the ash will make it impossible for planes to safely evacuate people or drop supplies. Instead, following his advice, FEMA creates the "Walk to Life" program, telling people to walk through the ash to safety.

One week after the eruption starts, the ground above the magma chamber begins to fall into the empty space left by the ejected magma, signalling the end of the eruption. However, the damage has been done; the lingering atmospheric effects cause a volcanic winter to occur. Much of the US is rendered uninhabitable, some are liquidated by the eruption without the possibility of restoration. The Walk to Life program saves 7.3 million of the 25 million people trapped by the ash, including Rick and Ken.

== Cast ==
- Michael Riley as Rick Lieberman
- Gary Lewis as Jock Galvin
- Shaun Johnston as Matt
- Adrian Holmes as Dave Price
- Jane McLean as Maggie Chin
- Jennifer Copping as Nancy
- Rebecca Jenkins as Wendy Reiss
- Tom McBeath as Michael Eldridge
- Robert Wisden as Kenneth Wylie
- Susan Duerden as Fiona Lieberman
- Emy Aneke as Sergeant Jeffrey Johnson
- Garry Chalk as Billy Marshall
- Garwin Sanford as Bob Mann
- Sam Charles as William Lieberman
- Kevin McNulty as Joe Foster
- Shelagh Mitchell as Fiona's Mother
- Jay Hernandez as USAF Airman
- Leslie Reyes as Rachel
- Joanna Gosling as Herself
- Chris Lowe as Himself
- Anna Jones as Herself

== Production ==
Supervolcano, which cost £2.8 million, is one of the most expensive programmes the BBC has ever made. It was funded by the BBC along with television stations in the United States, Germany, France, and Japan.

== Reception ==
=== Critical response ===
Brian Lowry of Variety wrote: "As disaster pics that make you want to play hooky from work go, Supervolcano has its unsettling moments." He also stated: "The biggest problem, actually, is that there's no action to be taken in response to this "What if Yellowstone National Park goes kablooey?" threat, except perhaps to get the hell out of North America."

=== Accolades ===
Year	Award	Category	Recipient(s)	Result	Ref.
2005	57th Primetime Creative Arts Emmy Awards	Outstanding Special Visual Effects for a Miniseries, Movie or a Special	Grahame Andrew; John-Paul Harney; Rob Harvey; Mark Richardson; Abbie Tucker-Williams; Max Wright; Tim Zaccheo	Nominated	
2005	9th OFTA Television Awards	Best Visual Effects in a Motion Picture or Miniseries	Supervolcano	Nominated	
2006	7th British Academy Television Craft Awards	Best Visual Effects	Lola	Nominated	
