= Priscus (gladiator) =

Roman gladiator

Priscus (fl. late 1st century AD) was a Roman gladiator of Celtic origins. His combat with Verus was the highlighted entertainment of the opening day games sponsored by Titus to inaugurate the Flavian Amphitheatre in AD 80. It was recorded in a laudatory poem by Martial — Liber Spectaculorum is the only known detailed description to survive of a gladiatorial fight. This laudatory poem was written to honor and to highlight all the events of Titus's games. Their fight marked the beginning of the celebration and concluded in a rare result. Both gladiators were declared victors of the match, and were unexpectedly awarded their freedom by the Emperor.

Martial described the fight in Liber de Spectaculis 29:

As Priscus and Verus each drew out the contest
and the struggle between the pair long stood equal,
shouts loud and often sought discharge for the combatants.
But Titus obeyed his own law
(the law was that the bout go on without shield until a finger be raised).
What he could do, he did, often giving dishes and presents.
But an end to the even strife was found:
equal they fought, equal they yielded.
To both Titus sent wooden swords and to both palms.
Thus valor and skill had their reward.
This has happened under no prince but you, Titus:
two fought and both won.

— Martial, Liber de Spectaculis 29

== Discussion ==
Priscus and Verus' fight occurred on the first day of the games, which celebrated the opening of the Colosseum. These games consisted mainly of gladiatorial fights, animal spectacles and staged sea battles. These games helped placate the Roman masses and increased Titus' popularity to the end of his reign in 81 AD. Beginning during the time of Julius Caesar, colosseum entertainment tactically satisfied the Roman mobs' pent-up frustrations with their cheering of the entertainment.

Gladiatorial fights did not always end with the death of a participant. A gladiator could raise a finger or surrender his weapon to the opponent to signal his willingness to concede defeat. And the imposition of "missio" would require that the conceding gladiator return to continued fight training. Missio was initiated following the spirit of the attendees with a reprieve from the match ending in a death. The fighters could initiate ending of the match requesting that the match be declared a draw as supported by the crowds. Gladiatorial surrender was not common since it was held in disdain.

== Role in fiction ==
The dramatized documentary by the BBC (2003) about the opening of games at the Colosseum featured the historical Priscus and Verus match. In the program, they were at the time both slaves having developed their skills through the gladiatorial process; Priscus from Gaul was born a slave and Verus was born free. Verus is predominantly known because of his match with Priscus.

Priscus and Verus also play a role in Adventure Time's "Morituri Te Salutamus" (season 3, episode 2) in which they fight the show's heroes, Finn and Jake, as ghosts of their former selves seeking their freedom.
