= Tunica molesta =

Torture device used in ancient Rome

A tunica molesta (Latin for "annoying shirt") was a tunic impregnated with pitch and other flammable substances such as naphtha or resin. This was put upon the victim while the neck of the victim was fixed to a stake with an iron collar. It was then ignited, burning the victim alive. Tunicae molestae were used for execution and torture in the Roman Empire.

== Origins ==
The origins of the tunica molesta are not agreed upon by scholars. Ben Hubbard believes that Nero invented the tunica molesta. This is probably not the case, since the tunica appears in literature of the centuries before Nero's reign. The tunica molesta seems to have first appeared as an aspect of the gladiator games. The origins of the gladiator games is more obscure.

Roman tradition held that gladiator games were not of Roman origin. Julia Shear traces their origin to Greek festivals now known as the Panathenian games. These celebrations included 'dancers in arms' (Gr.:pyrrhichistai) who are often seen as the fore-runners of gladiators. Some Roman writers thought the gladiator games came from the Circus Maximus or the Circus Flaminus which had developed under the Etruscan kings from the sixth century BC. The circus games were state occasions, presided over by a magistrate, and financed by the state, while the gladiatorial shows were later and did not originate as state occasions.

It is most likely that the games began as a part of the "offerings" owed to important men at their deaths. The object was to broadcast their prestige and uplift the status of their family. These Roman spectacles were a public display of power. The importance of funerals as important occasions which heirs exploited for these reasons is well attested. It is within this context that Roman gladiatorial contests are first recorded.

In early societies, the violence of blood sports and the sacred are often linked together in sacred contexts such as funerals. In Rome, these spectacles, called munera, might have included plays and chariot races as well as combat sports.

== Practices ==
The tunica molesta was commonly used to execute criminals; this was seen as holding special significance for arsonists. Capital punishments usually took place during the gladiator games in the Amphitheatre, at lunchtime, when all forms of public executions, including death by crematio, were carried out.

Execution by burning was often part of a dramatic performance of Graeco-Roman mythology. Dramas that contained conflict between good and evil were seen as morally uplifting, and public executions of convicted criminals were believed to doubly improve virtue by providing a real life deterrent. By the second half of the first century, evidence for executions as public spectacle is particularly strong. Afterwards, the charred corpse was dragged by a hook throughout the arena for spectators to see, although historian David Kyle writes that only the corpses of the hated and dangerous were treated this way.

Fire was a legal means of torture, abuse and execution in the empire. It was used to induce testimony from slaves, in the arena to provoke men and beasts who were reluctant to fight, and to confirm death.

It was certainly used to torture and kill Christians, and Nero did execute numbers of Christians in this manner; partly this was because early Christians preferred to be buried, like Jesus, rather than being burned. Tertullian wrote: "we are called 'faggot-fellows' and 'half-axle men' because we are tied to a half-axle post and faggots are piled around us, and we are burnt". Death was not swift; Kyle writes it was the torment of the 'slow-burn that was the norm.

One of the great satirists of Roman Empire was Decimus Junius Juvenalis, who tells Tigellinus Sophoneus, a supporter of Nero's who encouraged Nero's worst passions, that he would, himself, soon "shine in that torch like tunic".

Thomas Wiedemann has written that, "An epigram in the Book of Spectacles refers to someone 'in matutina arena' playing the role 'Mucius Scaevola', the Roman hero who proved his bravery in the presence of the Etruscan king Lars Porsena [circa 500 BC] by thrusting his right hand into the flame; this is said to have been an alternative to the tunica molesta." Famous charades that re-enacted this event were sometimes fatal.

== Bibliography ==
- Closs, Virginia M. (2020). While Rome Burned: Fire, Leadership, and Urban Disaster in the Roman Cultural Imagination. University of Michigan Press. ISBN 9780472131907.
- Kyle, Donald G. (2012). Spectacles of Death in Ancient Rome. Taylor & Francis. ISBN 9781134862719.
- Mahoney, Anne (2001). Roman Sports and Spectacles. Hackett Publishing Company, Incorporated. ISBN 9781585106066.
- Wiedemann, Thomas (2002). Emperors and Gladiators. Taylor & Francis. ISBN 9781134990405.
