= Richard Doyle =

Richard Doyle may refer to:

- Richard Doyle (actor) (born 1945), American actor
- Richard Doyle (author) (born 1948), British thriller writer
- Richard Doyle, the first All-American in Michigan Wolverines men's basketball history
- Richard Doyle (illustrator) (1824–1883), English illustrator
- Richard Doyle (sailor) (died 1807), U.S. Navy sailor who fought during the Barbary Wars
- Richard Doyle (politician) (1923–2003), Canadian senator, 1985–1998, journalist and author
- Dick Doyle (Wexford hurler) (1879–1946), Irish hurler
- Dick Doyle (Kilkenny hurler) (1888–1959), Irish hurler
- Dick Doyle (American football) (1930–2003), American football defensive back
- Dick Doyle (discus thrower), winner of the 1950 NCAA DI discus championships
