= Flood (Doyle novel) =

2002 novel by Richard Doyle

- First edition
- Author: Richard Doyle
- Language: English
- Genre: Thriller novel
- Publisher: Random House UK
- Publication date: 1 November 2002
- Publication place: United Kingdom
- Media type: Print (hardcover and paperback)
- ISBN: 978-0-7126-1477-1
- OCLC: 50654278

Flood is a 2002 disaster thriller novel by Richard Doyle. Set in present-day London, the novel depicts a disastrous flood and fire of London, caused by a storm, and the consequential accident at an oil refinery, and failure of the Thames Barrier. The plot is similar to his 1976 novel Deluge, updated to include the construction of the Thames Flood Barrier.

The book was adapted into a 2007 disaster film, Flood, directed by Tony Mitchell.

== Plot summary ==
In 1953, the East coast of England was struck by one of the worst storms of the century. In response to this, the Thames Flood Barrier was opened in 1984, to protect London from the danger. However, global warming has resulted in rising sea levels, higher waves and more frequent extreme weather. Londoners have become complacent, thinking that the flood barrier will protect them. The events will prove them wrong.

The Prime Minister is out of the country, leaving the Deputy Prime Minister and Home Secretary Venetia Maitland in charge. As the danger signs mount up, officials at all levels of the government are reluctant to take the necessary precautions, relying on margins of error, earlier missed predictions and fearing the consequences of an unnecessary evacuation.

A storm rages over the north of Britain, a troop carrier founders in the Irish Sea, flood indicators go off the scale, the seas are mountainous and a spring tide is about to strike the East Coast. Air-sea rescue and military personnel struggle to save lives all down the coast. The worse is yet to come. When the storm reaches the south the two forces of wind and tide will combine and send a huge one-in-a-thousand tidal surge up the Thames. But surely London is safe: the Thames Barrier will save the capital from disaster as it was intended to do? The river is a titanic presence by now, higher than anyone has known it, and the surge thunders towards the Barrier. Scientists begin to talk of the possibility of overtopping. Can fifty feet high gates be overwhelmed by a wave? Then there is an explosion the size of a small Hiroshima: a supertanker is ablaze in the estuary and most of the Essex petrochemical works are going up with it. The Thames catches fire and the wall of fire and water thunders towards Britain's capital. This is the story of what happens next, and the desperate attempts to save the capital from destruction.

Firefighters and first responders from all around the country, supplanted by German, French and American military, bravely fight against the disaster, but they can only save a fraction of those threatened.

Eventually, the saviour of London proves to be the same thing that threatened it, with rain from the storm extinguishing the fire.

== Characters ==
Due to the vignette style, many characters are unnamed, and only appear in single vignettes. However, many characters are recurring throughout the book.

- Venetia Maitland: Home Secretary and Deputy Prime Minister - With the prime minister on a visit to Australia, Maitland is the most senior politician available.
- Roland Raikes: Secretary to the Civil Contingencies Committee. The civil servant charged with organizing the response to any emergency.
- Angus Walsh: Engineer in charge of operating the Thames Flood Barrier.
- Lauren Khan: Journalist for the Daily Telegraph.
- Claire Panton: A teacher supervising her school's trip to the Dome.
- Paul Suter: A repair gang leader on the London Underground.
- Melanie Sykes: Junior doctor at St Thomas's Hospital.
- Ted Turner: Captain of the Jen-0 Tug & Fireboat, escorting a VLCC to dock at the Coryton Refinery.
- Sophie de Salis: A banker with an office in Canary Wharf.
- Chrissie de Salis: 12-year-old daughter of Sophie de Salis.
- Jo Binney: Friend of Chrissie de Salis.
- Harriet Binney: Mother of Jo Binney.
