= List of awards and nominations received by Anthrax =

Accolades of American heavy metal band

Anthrax awards and nominations
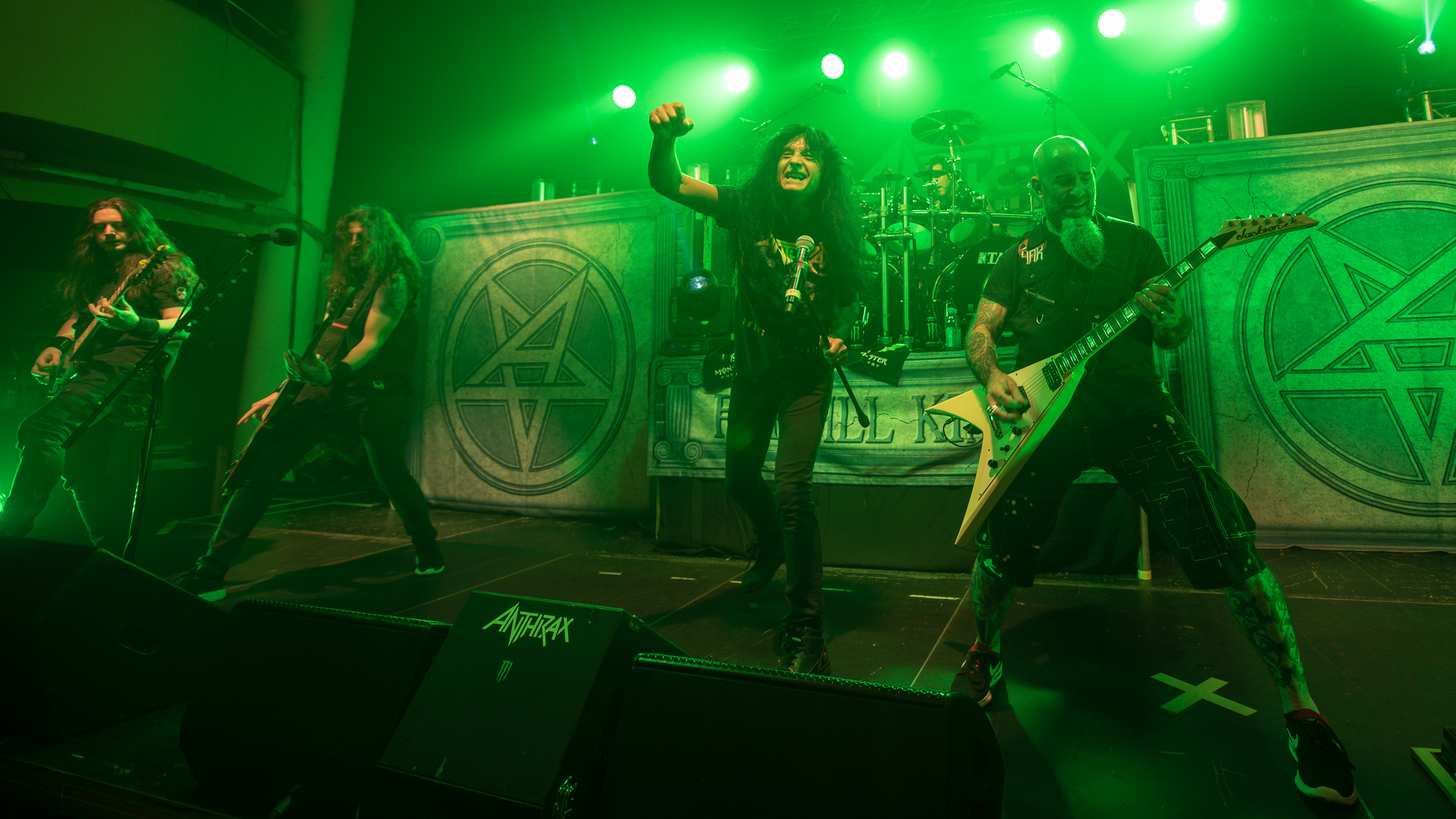
- Anthrax live in 2017
Awards and nominations
Award	Wins	Nominations

Totals (Note: Certain award groups do not simply award one winner. They acknowledge several different recipients, have runners-up, and have third place. Since this is a specific recognition and is different from losing an award, runner-up mentions are considered wins in this award tally. For simplification and to avoid errors, each award in this list has been presumed to have had a prior nomination.)
- Wins: 12
- Nominations: 37

Anthrax is an American heavy metal band from New York City, formed in 1981 by rhythm guitarist Scott Ian and bassist Dan Lilker. The group is considered one of the leaders of the thrash metal scene from the 1980s and is part of the "Big Four" of the genre, along with Metallica, Megadeth and Slayer.

Over the course of the band's career they have received multiple accolades such as six Grammy Award nominations, along with Kerrang! Awards, MTV Music Video Awards and were inducted into the Metal Hall of Fame in 2019.

== California Music Awards ==
The California Music Awards or CAMA is an annual awards ceremony held in California. Anthrax one nomination award.

Year	Nominee / work	Award	Result
2004	We've Come for You All	Outstanding Hard Rock Album	Nominated

== Classic Rock Roll of Honour Awards ==
The Classic Rock Roll of Honour Awards are awarded annually by Classic Rock magazine. Anthrax won the Metal Guru award in 2012.

Year	Nominee / work	Award	Result
2012	Anthrax	Metal Guru	Won

== Decibel Hall of Fame ==
Decibel Magazine, a prominent metal magazine, has a hall of fame for albums it considers "extreme music's most important albums. Anthrax has had two of their albums inducted.

Year	Nominee / work	Award	Result
2005	Among the Living	Decibel Hall of Fame	Inducted
2019	Fistful of Metal	Decibel Hall of Fame	Inducted

== Grammy Awards ==
The annual Grammy Awards are presented by the National Academy of Recording Arts and Sciences. Anthrax received six nominations, five in the Best Metal Performance category and one in the Best Hard Rock/Metal Performance category.

Year	Nominee / work	Award	Result
1991	Persistence of Time	Best Metal Performance	Nominated
1992	Attack of the Killer B's	Best Metal Performance	Nominated
1995	"Bring the Noise"	Best Metal Performance	Nominated
2013	"I'm Alive"	Best Hard Rock/Metal Performance	Nominated
2014	"T.N.T."	Best Metal Performance	Nominated
2015	"Neon Knights"	Best Metal Performance	Nominated
2027	"The Edge of Perfection"	Best Metal Performance	Pending

== Kerrang! Awards ==
The Kerrang! Awards is an annual awards ceremony held by Kerrang!, a British rock magazine. Anthrax received one award.

Year	Nominee / work	Award	Result
2004	Anthrax	Spirit of Rock Award	Won

== Loudwire Music Awards ==
Loudwire is an American hard rock and heavy metal online magazine. Annual Loudwire Awards were given to the public vote winners in multiple categories. Anthrax have received one awards from seven nominations.

Year	Nominee / work	Award	Result
2012	"I'm Alive"	Cage Match Hall of Fame	Won
2012	Anthrax	Live Act of the Year	Nominated
2012	"I'm Alive"	Metal Song of the Year	Nominated
2012	Anthrax	Metal Band of the Year	Nominated
2017	Anthrax	Best live Band	Nominated
2017	Charlie Benante	Best Drummer	Nominated
2017	Frank Bello	Best Bassist	Nominated

== Metal Hammer Golden Gods Awards ==
The Metal Hammer Golden Gods Awards is an annual awards ceremony held by Metal Hammer, a British heavy metal magazine. Anthrax have received three awards.

Year	Nominee / work	Award	Result
2005	Anthrax	Best Metal Band	Won
2012	Anthrax	Metal As Fuck	Won
2016	Anthrax	Inspiration Award	Won

== Metal Hammer Germany Awards ==
The Metal Hammer GermanyGolden Gods Awards is an annual awards ceremony held by the German version of Metal Hammer, Anthrax have received two nominations.

Year	Nominee / work	Award	Result
2017	Scott Ian	Legend Award	Nominated
2017	Scott Ian	God of Rifs	Nominated

== Metal Storm Awards ==
Metal Storm Awards is an annual awards ceremony held by Metal Storm, an Estonia-based heavy metal webzine. Anthrax has received eight awards from ten nominations in multiple categories.

Year	Nominee / work	Award	Result
2011	Worship Music	Best Trash Metal Album	Nominated
2011	Worship Music	Biggest Surprise	Nominated
2016	For All Kings	Best Heavy / Melodic Metal Album	Won

== Metal Hall of Fame ==
The Metal Hall of Fame is an US based Hall of Fame which preserves the legacy of iconic musicians and industry figures who have shaped hard rock and heavy metal music, Anthrax was inducted in 2019.

Year	Nominee / work	Award	Result
2019	Anthrax	The Metal Hall of Fame	Inducted

== Metal Edge Readers Choice ==
The Metal Edge Readers choice was a yearly awards poll held by Metal Edge. Anthrax has won one award.

Year	Nominee / work	Award	Result
2003	"Safe Home"	Song of the Year	Won

== MTV Music Video Awards ==
The MTV Music Video Awards are a yearly award show presented by MTV to honor the best in the music video medium. Anthrax received one nomination.

Year	Nominee / work	Award	Result
1994	"Black Lodge"	Best Metal/Hard Rock Video	Nominated

== Revolver Music Awards ==
The Revolver Music Awards (formerly known as Revolver Golden Gods Awards) are awarded annually by the American music magazine Revolver. Anthrax received 7 nominations and 1 win.

Year	Nominee / work	Award	Result
2012	Worship Music	Album of the Year	Nominated
2012	Anthrax	Comeback of the Year	Nominated
2012	Charlie Benante	Best Drummer	Nominated
2012	Frank Bello	Best Bassist	Nominated
2012	Scott Ian	Riff Lord	Nominated
2016	Anthrax	Most Dedicated Fans	Nominated
2016	Anthrax	Revolver Innovator Award	Won
