= Atlantis (2011 film) =

- DVD cover
- Genre: Docudrama; TV movie
- Written by: Rhidian Brook
- Directed by: Tony Mitchell
- Starring: Stephanie Leonidas; Reece Ritchie
- Narrated by: Tom Conti
- Countries of origin: United Kingdom; South Africa
- Original language: English

Production
- Running time: 60 minutes

Original release
- Network: BBC One
- Release: 8 May 2011

Related
- Pompeii: The Last Day

Atlantis (also titled Atlantis: End of a World, Birth of a Legend) is a 2011 BBC docudrama which portrays events surrounding the volcanic eruption which destroyed the island of Thera, an incident portrayed as having inspired the parable of Atlantis. The hour-long programme featured Stephanie Leonidas and Reece Ritchie as individuals of the Bronze Age civilization. The film was narrated by Tom Conti, and made its debut on BBC One on Sunday 8 May 2011.

== Synopsis ==
With voiceover from Tom Conti, the film tells the story of Yishharu, an apprentice bull-leaper who has recently returned to Thera from Crete with his new wife, Pinaruti. They discover that Thera is beset by earthquakes and volcanic activity. Over the course of the story, the volcano erupts, throwing out ash and molten lava, and destroying the island with pyroclastic flows. Although the couple survive the first stages of the disaster they are separated after Yishharu is left behind when Pinaruti and other islanders escape by boat. The nearby island of Crete is then engulfed by a giant tsunami which was triggered by the eruption, and Pinaruti is washed up on the shore of a nearby island.

== Cast ==
- Narrator - Tom Conti
- Pinaruti - Stephanie Leonidas
- Yishharu - Reece Ritchie
- Rusa - Langley Kirkwood
- Bansabira - Isadora Verwey
- Ariad - Natalie Becker
- Yidini - Tony Caprari

== Reception ==
Reception from critics was generally negative. Zoe Williams, writing for The Guardian said: "The heavy-handed doomsday lighting made it look like the build-up to a joke on a Pot Noodle ad. The dialogue sounded like Holby City...The more dramatic the narration tried to be, the more mundane it sounded...The truth, I think, is that someone somewhere was looking for the new Pompeii, because we've all heard that one, and decided this was it: the second-best ancient disaster status clung doggedly to the project. An equally unfavourable review in The Independent suggested: "The final explosion has been calculated to have been 40,000 times more powerful than the Hiroshima bomb, and it would have been a great mercy if it had occurred 50 minutes earlier in Atlantis. That would have given us the bull-jumping – which was rather excitingly filmed – and spared us the catastrophe that followed."
