= Jonathan Donais =

American guitarist (born 1979)

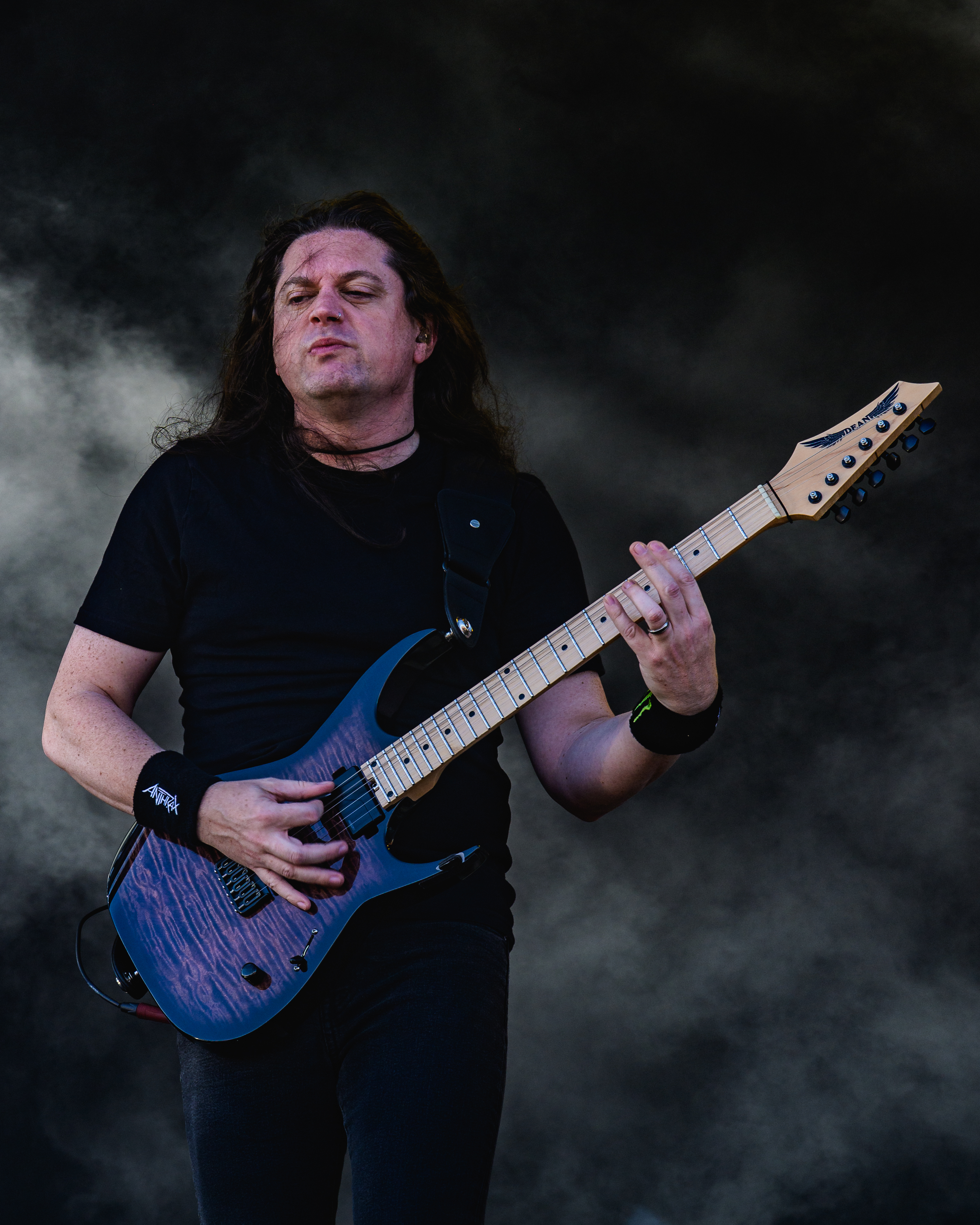
- With Anthrax at Tons of Rock, 2026

Background information
- Also known as: Jon Donais
- Born: April 5, 1979 (age 47); Northampton, Massachusetts, U.S.
- Origin: Southampton, Massachusetts, U.S.
- Genres: Thrash metal; metalcore; heavy metal; melodic death metal
- Occupation: Guitarist
- Years active: 1995–present
- Member of: Anthrax; Shadows Fall; Living Wreckage
- Formerly of: Aftershock

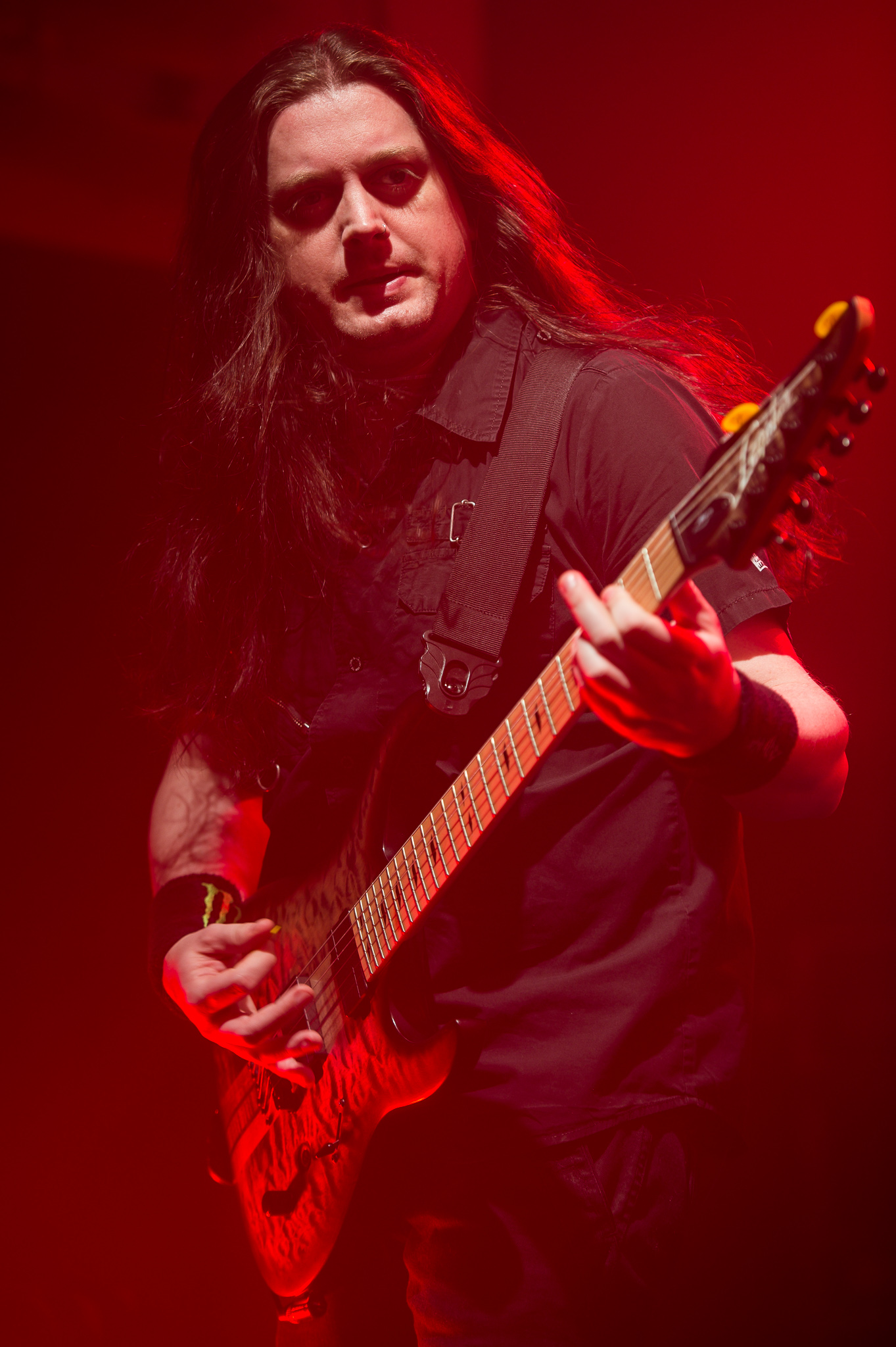
Donais performing with Anthrax in 2017

Jonathan Donais (born April 5, 1979), also known as Jon Donais, is an American guitarist, best known as the lead guitarist for thrash metal band Anthrax since 2013, and as co-founder of metalcore band Shadows Fall.

== Career ==
=== Early career and Shadows Fall ===
Prior to co-founding Shadows Fall with fellow guitarist Matt Bachand in 1996, Donais was a member of metalcore band Aftershock from 1993 to 1997, which morphed into Killswitch Engage, although after his departure. Shadows Fall's first line-up included Donais and Bachand alongside Damien McPherson (vocals), Mark Laliberte (bass), and David Germain (drums). By late 1996, the band recorded and released a demo titled Mourning a Dead World, of which only about 200 copies were produced. It consisted of the songs Lifeless, Suffer the Season, Fleshold, Forever Lost, A Souls Salvation, and Deadworld. McPherson decided to leave the band, and was replaced by Philip Labonte in 1997. Around the same time, bass guitarist Paul Romanko, formerly of the hardcore band Pushbutton Warfare, was recruited as a permanent replacement for Laliberte, who had originally joined on a temporary basis. Now with a more solid lineup, the band released its first EP, To Ashes, with Aftershock member Adam Dutkiewicz playing as a session drummer. The band's name, according to Bachand, comes from the title of a comic book published in the early 1990s.

The band gained success in the 2000s with their albums Art of Balance (2002) The War Within (2004) and Threads of Life (2007). Garnering two Grammy nominations for Best Metal Performance in 2006 and 2008. Individually Donais and his fellow bandmate Matt Bachand were voted best Best New Talent in the 2004 Guitar World readers poll. That same year the duo were also named to Guitar Worlds list of the 100 best Guitar players of all time. The group then released 2 more successful albums between 2008-2012, Retribution (2009) and Fire From the Sky (2012).

Shadows Fall went on hiatus in Summer 2015 after completing "farewell" tours in Europe and North America.

On June 22, 2021, vocalist Brian Fair confirmed that Shadows Fall were reuniting for their first show in over half a decade at the Worcester Palladium on December 18. Supporting acts for this show were Unearth, Darkest Hour, Within the Ruins, Sworn Enemy and Carnivora. Flair also said that the band could release new music. Then after playing a couple of live shows the group released new material for the first time in 12 years on December 6, 2024, a single titled "In the Grey."

=== Anthrax ===
Prior to Shadows Fall going on hiatus, On January 11, 2013 Donais was announced to be joining thrash metal band Anthrax on their Metal Alliance Tour, replacing Rob Caggiano who had left the band to join Volbeat. Donais made his live debut with Anthrax in Australia without a single rehearsal with the band. "I jammed with Scott [Ian, guitarist] a little bit, but it was, 'Here. Learn these songs and be ready,'" he recalled. "Oh. God. That first show — I was shaking." Donais was originally a touring member until August 13, 2013. The first Anthrax release that Donais appeared on was Chile on Hell live album and video in 2014, which was from a concert recorded at the Teatro Caupolican in Santiago, Chile, on May 10, 2013. Donais has appeared on the band's following studio albums For All Kings in 2016, and Cursum Perficio in 2026.

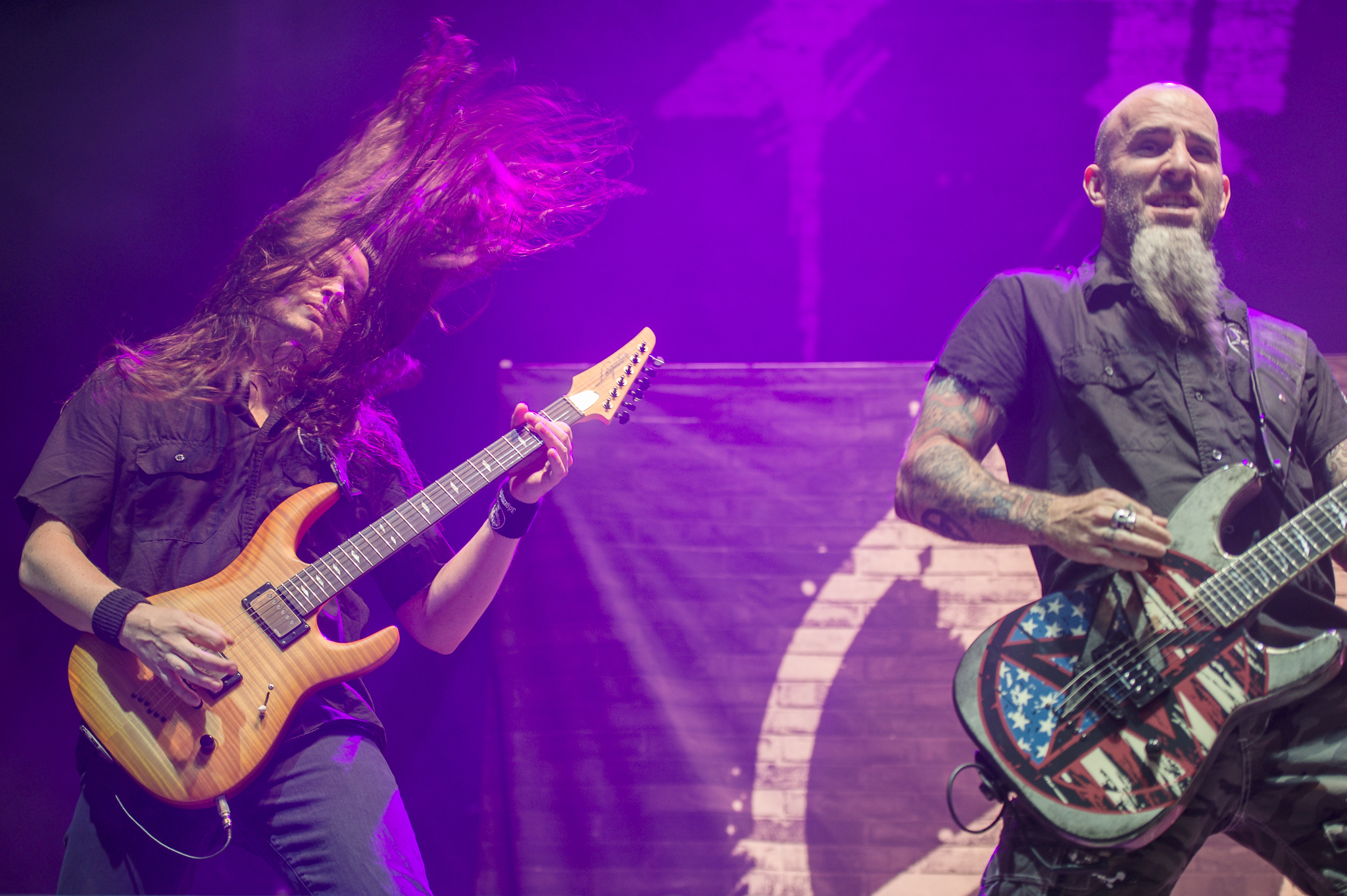
Donais (left) and Scott Ian performing with Anthrax in 2014

According to Donais, he was asked to join Anthrax by his predecessor Rob Caggiano "Cause he knew he was gonna leave, and he wanted to make sure that they were all set." Donais' time with the band has earned praise from his bandmates, with Frank Bello saying "I think Jon has brought a great energy to the band. He stepped up and then some on this record (For All Kings)." and Scott Ian saying, "Jon's approach towards lead guitar playing, he's more of a guy who's looking to construct something that makes sense and helps a song rather than the 45 seconds for him to be showing off how many notes he can play in X amount of measures." Donais has said that it was "a dream come true! I'm playing for a band that have been a huge influence for me.".

Donais has stated that he is not involved in the band's songwriting process saying, "All bands work different, man. They have a way that's worked, and they've [had a] strong 40-year career. So, if it's not broken, don't mess with it." However he did right leads on the bands 2026, album Cursum Perficio.

=== Living Wreckage ===
Donais is also a member of supergroup Living Wreckage, which features Donais, vocalist Jeff Gard (Death Ray Vision), guitarist Matt LeBreton (Downpour), bassist Matt Bachand (Shadows Fall, Act of Defiance) and drummer Jon Morency (Let Us Prey). The band came about during COVID-19 pandemic and was composed of musicians who lived near each other so "we could get in the basement once a week and just do it the old school way of, you know, having some beers, jammin and just having fun with friends. And that's what it is. We're all friends from the same area. We're in the same scene. So things fell together really quickly and Matt LeBreton, the other guitar player, he writes a lot too. So between the both of us songs are coming out left and right pretty fast." The band's music is a cross between thrash metal and arena rock, like "Skid Row, Tesla, the mainstream MTV stuff that was in the eighties. And then also nineties metal and rock. Bands like Sepultura, Nevermore and Alice in Chains, Soundgarden, stuff like that."

== Influences ==
Donais main influences are guitarists Zakk Wylde (Black Label Society) and Dimebag Darrell (Pantera), both of which he has toured with; Randy Rhoads (Ozzy Osbourne), James Hetfield (Metallica), Warren DeMartini (Ratt), John Sykes (Thin Lizzy, Whitesnake) and Alex Skolnick (Testament). Early bands that influenced him include Skid Row, Guns N' Roses, Tesla and Whitesnake. He has also recommended DVDs of lessons by Paul Gilbert and John Petrucci.

In recent years Donais has used an economy picking style. For his gear he uses his Dean Signature Exile, he records with a Kemper using the same lead sound that he uses live, he has since switched to a Neural DSP Quad Cortex.

== Discography ==
=== Aftershock ===
- Two Songs EP (1996)

=== Anthrax ===
- Chile on Hell (2014)
- For All Kings (2016)
- Kings Among Scotland (2018)
- "Indians / Sabbath Bloody Sabbath" (2019)
- XL (MCMLXXXI - MMXXI) (2022)
- Cursum Perficio (2026)

=== Living Wreckage ===
- One Foot in the Grave (2021)
- Living Wreckage (2022)

=== Other appearances ===
Year	Artist	Title	Notes
2006	Brian Posehn	Live In: Nerd Rage	Guitar solo on "Metal By Numbers", also features then future Anthrax bandmate Scott Ian.
2008	Various	We Wish You a Metal Xmas and a Headbanging New Year	Appears on track "Silent Night" alongside Chuck Billy (Testament), Scott Ian (Anthrax) & Chris Wyse and John Tempesta (The Cult).
2011	Stryper	The Covering	Additional backing vocals on track "God" with Maria Ellena Leone, as Jon Donais.
2012	Hatebreed	Perseverance	Gang vocals on unspecified songs.
2020	Lost Symphony	Chapter II	Appears (as Jon Donais) on track "A Murder of Crows" alongside Matt Bachand & Jimi Bell.
