= 1910 All-Ireland Senior Hurling Championship =

All-Ireland champions
- Winning team: Wexford (1st win)
- Captain: Dick Doyle

All-Ireland Finalists
- Losing team: Limerick
- Captain: John "Tyler" Mackey

Provincial champions
- Munster: Limerick
- Leinster: Wexford
- Ulster: Antrim
- Connacht: Galway

Championship statistics
- All-Star Team: See here

The All-Ireland Senior Hurling Championship 1910 was the 24th series of the All-Ireland Senior Hurling Championship, Ireland's premier hurling knock-out competition. Wexford won the championship, beating Limerick 7–0 to 6–2 in the final.

== Format ==
All-Ireland Championship

Quarter-finals: (2 matches) These are two lone matches that see the Leinster representatives play London and the Ulster representatives play Glasgow. Two teams are eliminated at this stage while the two winning teams advance to the semi-finals.

Semi-finals: (2 matches) The two winning teams from the quarter-finals join the Connacht and Munster representatives to make up the semi-final pairings. The two quarter-final-winning teams play in one semi-final while the second semi-final is a Connacht-Munster game. Two teams are eliminated at this stage while the two winning teams advance to the All-Ireland final.

Final: (1 match) The winners of the two semi-finals contest this game with the winners being declared All-Ireland champions.

== Results ==
=== Leinster Senior Hurling Championship ===
Semi-finals

12 June 1910 Semi-final	Wexford	1–07 – 5–14	Offaly	Jones's Road, Dublin

11 September 1910 Semi-final	Dublin	4–01 – 2–01	Kilkenny	Maryborough Sportsfield, Maryborough

Final

23 October 1910 Final	Wexford	3–03 – 1–01	Dublin	Athy Sportsfield, Athy

=== Munster Senior Hurling Championship ===
First round

22 May 1910 First round	Limerick	3–10 – 4–05	Clare	Markets Field, Limerick

12 June 1910 First round	Kerry	2–10 – 1–04	Waterford	Cork Athletic Grounds, Cork

Semi-finals

3 July 1910 Semi-final	Cork	5–07 – 3–04	Tipperary	Markets Field, Limerick

2 October 1910 Semi-final	Limerick	6–02 – 2–00	Kerry	Markets Field, Limerick

Final

16 October 1910 Final	Limerick	5–01 – 4–02	Cork	Sports Field, Tralee

=== Ulster Senior Hurling Championship ===
Final

Final	Antrim	4–07 – 2–02	Monaghan

=== All-Ireland Senior Hurling Championship ===
Quarter-finals

31 July 1910 Quarter-final	Antrim	0–07 – 1–13	Glasgow	Belfast

4 September 1910 Quarter-final	Kilkenny	5–11 – 0–03	London	Waterford

Semi-finals

21 August 1910 Semi-final	Galway	1–00 – 7–03	Cork	Tuam

2 October 1910 Semi-final	Dublin	6–06 – 5–01	Glasgow	Jones’s Road, Dublin

Final

20 November 1910 Final	Wexford	7–00 – 6–02	Limerick	Jones’s Road, Dublin
				Attendance: 4,780; Referee: MF Crowe (Limerick)

== Championship statistics ==
=== Miscellaneous ===
- Three Leinster teams represented the province in the All-Ireland series of games. Kilkenny, as reigning All-Ireland champions, were nominated to represent Leinster in the All-Ireland quarter-final against Antrim. Dublin represented Leinster in the All-Ireland semi-final against Glasgow as they had earlier defeated reigning champions Kilkenny in the provincial semi-final. Wexford were the Leinster representatives in the All-Ireland final as they had earlier defeated Dublin to claim the provincial title.
- Two Munster teams represented the province in the All-Ireland series of games. Cork were nominated to represent Munster in the All-Ireland semi-final against Galway. They were subsequently defeated by Limerick in the Munster semi-final who represented the province in the All-Ireland final.

== Sources ==
- Corry, Eoghan, The GAA Book of Lists (Hodder Headline Ireland, 2005).
- Donegan, Des, The Complete Handbook of Gaelic Games (DBA Publications Limited, 2005).
- Fullam, Brendan, Captains of the Ash (Wolfhound Press, 2002).
