= Jason Bittner =

American drummer

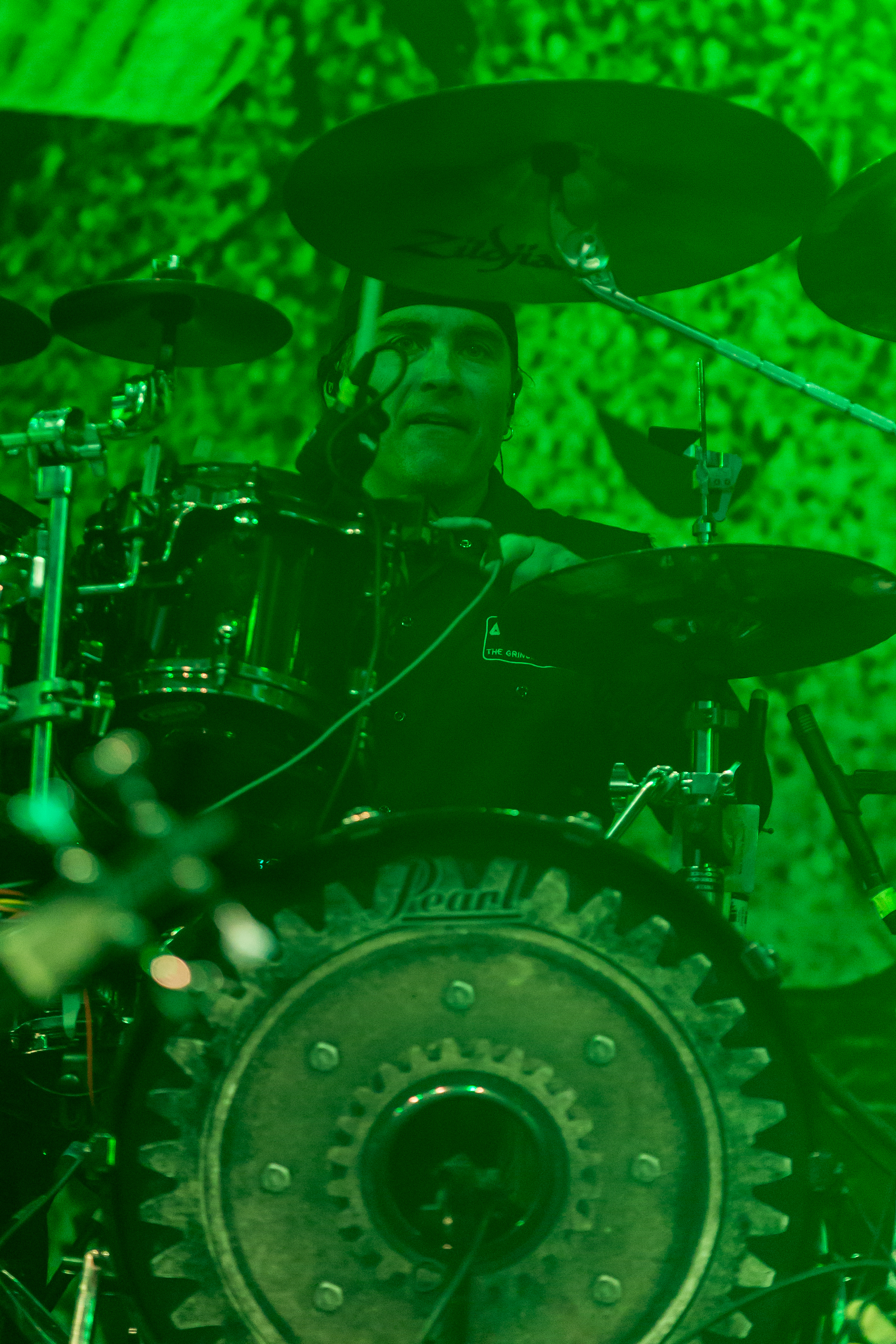
- Bittner performing with Overkill in 2017

Background information
- Born: January 11, 1970 (age 56); Niskayuna, New York, U.S.
- Genres: Heavy metal, thrash metal, rock, hardcore punk, death metal, ska, jazz fusion, Latin music
- Occupation: Drummer
- Years active: 1990–present
- Member of: Shadows Fall, Burning Human, Category 7
- Formerly of: Stigmata, Toxik, Flotsam and Jetsam, Overkill, Crisis

Jason Bittner (born January 11, 1970) is an American musician, best known as the longtime drummer for metal band Shadows Fall. He is also the current drummer for supergroup Category 7 as of 2024. He was also the drummer for the thrash metal bands Toxik from 2013 to 2014, Flotsam and Jetsam from 2014 to 2017, and Overkill from 2017 to 2024.

== Career ==
Bittner started taking formal drum lessons at the age of ten years. However he has stated that he "had been banging on pots, pans, and garbage cans since he was about five." A native of Schenectady, New York, he continued to take lessons and perform in his middle school and Linton high school jazz and orchestra ensembles before attending Berklee College of Music in 1988. After a year of intensive study, he left Berklee to pursue his musical career outside the educational environment. This led to playing in various metal and hard rock bands throughout the late eighties and early nineties.

In 1994, he joined the band Stigmata, a prominent hardcore band in the Upstate New York Hardcore scene alongside legendary vocalist, Bob Riley. Over the course of the next 7 years, they recorded 3 albums, released a home video, and toured the U.S. and Europe with this outfit. Bittner also played in death metal band Burning Human with New York phenom Mike Stack. They recorded 7 songs that would appear on the album "We The People: A tribute to upstate NY's hardest." Most of these songs would be rerecorded for their first album which would not come out for another decade after Bittner joined Shadows Fall. Burning Human would eventually disband in the late 1990s. Stigmata disbanded in 2001; the following fall, Bittner joined Shadows Fall. Initially, he had signed on just to do one tour of Europe with the band, but subsequently decided to remain as a permanent member.

In September 2002, the band released "The Art of Balance" and went on to tour throughout the United States, Japan, and Europe. In 2004 Bittner was named the Best Up and Coming Drummer in the Modern Drummer Readers Poll. Over the course of 2005, following the release of Shadows Fall's follow up effort The War Within, Bittner started establishing himself as a clinician, performing at the Modern Drummer Festival, the DRUMMER live festival in the UK, followed by a clinic tour of Germany, and also PASIC in November 2005. Bittner once again took home top honors in the Modern Drummers reader polling being voted both, Best Metal Drummer and Best Recording performance for his work on The War Within. Bittner and Shadows Fall then performed at that years award festival.

In January 2006, he filled in for two shows for Anthrax drummer Charlie Benante, who could not tour due to family obligations. That same year he once again took home top Metal honors at the Modern Drummer festival. He also made a surprise guest appearance at a show in Clifton Park, New York in November 2011. He also filled in for Benante for a few shows throughout early 2012, after Gene Hoglan had helped Anthrax out, after the passing of Benante's mother. He returned once again in late June 2012 filling in for Charlie after he hurt his wrist, continuing to perform with Anthrax through October 2012. Hudson Music released a joint DVD with Bittner and Chris Adler of the American metal band Lamb of God, Pro-Mark introduced the Jason Bittner Signature model 5BX drumstick, and Meinl introduced the Bell Blast ride, designed in conjunction with Jason. He was the cover feature of the UK drum publications, DRUMMER and Rhythm, the cover feature of DRUM!, and participated on Magna Carta's Drum Nation 3 record. Shadows Fall released "Fallout From the War" on Century Media Records in 2006 and spent the remainder of the year writing and recording Threads of Life at Studio 606 in L.A. with Producer Nick Raskulinecz (Foo Fighters, Rush). Bittner also won the Modern Drummer Reader's poll for #1 Metal drummer for the second year in a row.

In the early winter months of 2007, Bittner spent much of his time writing and recording old and material for his original band, "Burning Human." Late March brought the beginning of the Shadows Fall tour cycle supporting Threads of Life, which was released in April 3, 2007. Also during this time period, Bittner started writing a monthly drum column for RHYTHM magazine in the UK, was a faculty member (along with Steve Smith, Dave Weckl, and Horacio Hernandez) at the 2007 Drum Fantasy Camp held at Seton Hall University, and won #1 Metal Drummer and #1 Rising Drumming Star awards in the 2007 DRUM! Reader's Poll. His book, "Drumming Out of The Shadows," co-authored by Joe Bergamini, received the #2 award in the DRUM! Reader's Poll for Best Educational Book, and he was also featured in the book "On the Beaten Path" by Rich Lackowski, the #1 Educational Book of 2008 in the Modern Drummer and DRUM! Magazine reader's polls. Bittner and Hudson Music launched his first ever instructional DVD entitled "What Drives the Beat" in October 2008, with a clinic tour following its release.

Bittner played an acoustic set with George Lynch (Lynch Mob) and Stu Hamm (Joe Satriani) in the first ever acoustic performance of Lynch's Mr. Scary. The private event was hosted by US Music at the Hilton Hotel for NAMM 2010. In 2011, he signed on as a Zildjian cymbal artist and commenced on a worldwide 30-city drum clinic tour that covered the globe from the US to Australia to Europe, the UK and as far as Russia. 2012 brought the release of Shadows Fall's new cd "Fire From the Sky" and the band did one tour before Bittner was once again called to fill in for Charlie Benante in Anthrax for a 4-month period over the summer and fall. The band completed the 2012 Rockstar Mayhem Festival and its subsequent Canadian tour, and Bittner then returned to Shadows Fall, full-time. At that time, the band was on the road supporting "Fire From the Sky" and did so into most of 2013. Shadows Fall announced a hiatus prior to the end of 2013.

In the fall of 2013, Bittner also joined thrash metal band Toxik as their new drummer, but left the band due to if not being as productive as he was looking for as far as touring potential.

On December 19, 2014, it was announced that Bittner had joined thrash metal band Flotsam and Jetsam as their new drummer. He would stay with the band for one album release, the self-titled Flotsam and Jetsam and its tour cycle, but departed in April 2017. On May 4, 2017, Bittner officially joined Overkill, replacing Ron Lipnicki as the band's drummer. In 2021 Bittner reunited with his former Shadows Fall band mates for a reunion show, and in 2024 the group released their first song in 12 years. Bittner departed from Overkill on August 5, 2024.

== Equipment ==
Bittner is currently endorsed by Pearl Drums and hardware, Zildjian Cymbals, Remo, DW Pedals, Pro-Mark sticks, Gator Cases, LP percussion, and Cympad

- Drums – Pearl Drums Masters Premium Legend, Fire Red (Shadows Fall) Green to Black fade (Overkill) (376)
  - 8"×7" rack tom
  - 10"×8" rack tom
  - 12"×9" rack tom
  - 14"×14" floor tom
  - 16"×16" floor tom
  - 22"×18" Bass Drum (×2)
  - 14"×6.5" Reference brass snare drum or a 14"×5" Reference snare drum

== Discography ==
- Stigmata – Hymns for an Unknown God (1995)
- We the People: A Tribute to New York's Hardest (1995)
- Crisis – The Hollowing (1997)
- Stigmata – Pain Has No Boundaries (1998)
- Everdark – Twilight Burns (1998)
- Stigmata – Troy Blood Unbeaten (1999)
- Stigmata – Do Unto Others (2000)
- Shadows Fall – The Art of Balance (2002)
- Shadows Fall – The War Within (2004)
- Shadows Fall – Fallout from the War (Compilation) (2006)
- Jason Bittner – Instr. (Drum Nation, Volume 3) (2006)
- Shadows Fall – Threads of Life (2007)
- Burning Human – Resurrection Through Fire (2009)
- Stigmata – The Wounds That Never Heal (Compilation) (2009)
- Shadows Fall – Retribution (2009)
- Shadows Fall – Madness in Manila (Live) (2010)
- Marty Friedman – Tokyo Jukebox 2 (2011)
- Shadows Fall – Fire from the Sky (2012)
- Hellspeak – The Slaughter Rule of Agony EP (2013)
- Stigmata – Conditioned to Murder (2015)
- Half Past My Sin – 4:44 May 2014 (remixed, released July 2016)
- Coconut Donut – Musically Delicious (2016)
- Flotsam and Jetsam – Flotsam and Jetsam (2016)
- Overkill – The Wings of War (2019)
- Overkill – Scorched (2023)
- Category 7 - Category 7 (2024)
