= Fire from the Sky =

Studio album by Shadows Fall
- Released: May 15, 2012
- Recorded: 2011
- Studios: Zing Recording Studios (Westfield, Massachusetts); Wicked Good Recording Studios
- Genres: Metalcore, thrash metal
- Length: 41:37
- Label: Razor & Tie
- Producers: Adam Dutkiewicz, Shadows Fall

Shadows Fall chronology
Retribution (2009)	Fire from the Sky (2012)

Singles from Fire from the Sky
- 1. "The Unknown" Released: May 2, 2012

Fire from the Sky is the seventh studio album by American heavy metal band Shadows Fall. It was released on May 15, 2012. The band released the title track as the first single on March 28, 2012, and the opening track, "The Unknown", as the second single on May 2, as well as a lyric video for the song. About a week later, on May 10, the official music video for "The Unknown" was released through Vevo. It features the band playing in an abandoned warehouse. The album debuted at #38 on the Billboard 200, and at #85 in Canada.

== Background ==
In an interview the bands lead singer Brian Fair commented on the album stating:

The band always tries to cover a good amount of ground with each record and we have a wide variety of influences. I feel this album is a further extension of us. We are getting more comfortable with putting all those influences into great songs. There are songs on the album that are on the real heavy side, some that are more classic metal and some that are full on thrash tunes. We try to cover a variety of styles without sounding schizophrenic.

== Lyrical themes ==
Themes explored in Fire from the Sky include the apocalypse, chaos, doomsday, and the supposed events that may occur at the end of 2012, the end of the Mayan calendar. Brian Fair made the following comment:

Fire From the Sky is not a concept album by any means, but a few common themes do link these songs together. These days, the world seems to be spiraling out of control into a frantic state of confusion, corruption and chaos. It's as if we are living under the shadow of an impending apocalypse. The songs on this album were inspired by this chaos and the struggle to find answers in these dark days.

Fair also added that the music that the rest of the band was writing had an eerie, dark vibe, which inspired the lyrics to also fall that way.

== Song meanings ==
The song "The Unknown" is about "the temptation to give into depression instead of fighting it," and is written from the viewpoint of someone who ultimately succumbed to the pressure. "Divide and Conquer" talks about division between people, whether in politics or among friends, and how this division makes it harder to sustain things and come together as one. The only resolution is to work together towards a better future. "Weight of the World" deals with doomsday and the end of the world approaching. It also deals with the rapid growth of technology and concerns of technological singularity.

"Nothing Remains," a '70s rock influenced tune, is about the heroes we have lost that we looked up to. "Fire from the Sky," reminiscent of early '90s death metal such as Morbid Angel, tells the story of a star going supernova and devouring planets. "Save Your Soul" deals with hanging onto unresolved problems. Becoming stuck in the past can eat away at someone, and "letting go" is often easier said than done.

"Blind Faith" is a political song, and addresses "society giving up too much control to the ruling elite", and blindly following in the vein of paternalism. The track "Lost Within" is about being inspired by a person or movement, and then later realizing this idealism is false. In other words, some role models become internalized and selfish, and sell out or develop materialistic motives. "Walk the Edge" is largely influenced by '80s glam metal, and contains a few riffs originally from the Retribution sessions. The song is about opiate addiction and the thin line between control and overdose. For "The Wasteland," Fair was inspired by one of his favorite poems, The Waste Land by T. S. Eliot. He also drew influence from the Book of Revelation to create an apocalyptic theme.

== Critical reception ==
Professional ratings
Review scores
Source	Rating
About.com	4/5 stars
AllMusic	3.5/5 stars
Alternative Press	3.5/5 stars
Decibel	8/10 stars
Metal Injection	8/10 stars
Outburn Magazine	8/10 stars
The Phoenix	3.5/4 stars
Revolver	4/5 stars
The NewReview	3.5/5 stars
Thrash Magazine	4/5 stars

The album was met with positive reception Thom Jurek of AllMusic wrote “Fair's vocals are right up front and you can hear every word. Thankfully, he's one of the better lyricists in metal.” Adding “This is another step into the sonic and lyric terrain plowed on Retribution, but one in which SF's aggressive, thrashing abandon, musical sophistication, and melodies co-exist in near perfect balance.” Alex writing for Thrash Magazine added “Fire From The Sky is the strongest album we’ve seen from Shadows Fall in some time.” J Andrew of Metal Injection wrote “If there was any doubt of their ability to stay relevant and strong in 2012, Shadows Fall has set it ablaze with Fire From the Sky.” Ultimate Guitar gave the album a 8/10 stating “ This is their best work since "The War Within". Adding that have always left me in awe after each album from a technical standpoint, and everything about them has always been crushing, and "Fire From The Sky" is no exception to that.”

== Track listing ==
All tracks are written by Shadows Fall.

No.	Title	Length
1.	"The Unknown"	4:54
2.	"Divide and Conquer"	3:05
3.	"Weight of the World"	3:55
4.	"Nothing Remains"	3:20
5.	"Fire from the Sky"	4:55
6.	"Save Your Soul"	3:53
7.	"Blind Faith"	6:27
8.	"Lost Within"	3:31
9.	"Walk the Edge"	3:32
10.	"The Wasteland"	4:05
Total length:		41:37

Best Buy bonus tracks
No.	Title	Length
11.	"Eternal Life"	3:55
12.	"A Death Worth Dying"	3:22

iTunes bonus tracks
No.	Title	Length
11.	"The Light That Blinds" (Live)	4:24
12.	"Failure of the Devout" (Live)	5:22

== Personnel ==
Shadows Fall

- Brian Fair – lead vocals
- Jon Donais – lead guitar, backing vocals
- Matt Bachand – rhythm guitar, clean vocals
- Paul Romanko – bass
- Jason Bittner – drums

Production

- Produced and engineered by Adam Dutkiewicz
- Assistant engineering by Jim Fogarty
- Mixed by Brian Virtue at Modernist Movement Studios
- Mastered by Paul Logus at Taloowa
- Album artwork and design by Aaron Marsh

== Charts ==
Chart performance for Fire from the Sky
Chart (2012)	Peak position
Canadian Albums (Nielsen SoundScan)	85
US Billboard 200	38
US Independent Albums (Billboard)	10
US Indie Store Album Sales (Billboard)	17
US Top Hard Rock Albums (Billboard)	4
US Top Rock Albums (Billboard)	17
