= Retribution (Shadows Fall album) =

Studio album by Shadows Fall
- Released: September 15, 2009
- Recorded: January 2009
- Genres: Thrash metal, metalcore
- Length: 46:02; 58:41 (bonus tracks)
- Label: Everblack Industries
- Producers: Chris "Zeuss" Harris, Shadows Fall

Shadows Fall chronology
Seeking the Way: The Greatest Hits (2007)	Retribution (2009)	Fire from the Sky (2012)

Singles from Retribution
- 1. "Still I Rise" Released: August 11, 2009; 2. "Bark at the Moon" Released: March 15, 2010

Retribution is the sixth studio album by American heavy metal band Shadows Fall. The album was released on September 15, 2009. It debuted at number 35 on the Billboard 200. The album would produce singles for "Still I Rise" and for their cover of Ozzy Osbourne's "Bark at the Moon".

== Background ==
Following their major record debut of their previous album Threads of Life on Atlantic Records. Atlantic wanted Shadows Fall follow up release to be more commercial, but after they refused they were let go by the label. Following a 2008 tour the band returned to the studio and began writing a new record while being frustrated and stressed. Vocalist Brian Fair told Revolver Magazine that the new songs are similar to those on Threads of Life though darker and almost ballad-free.

Guitarist Matt Bachand told Guitar World in 2010:

This record is a big ‘fuck you’ to the entire industry, We had already tried to satisfy our label with Threads and it didn’t work, so when we wrote this one we didn’t worry about what someone else was gonna think about it; we just did what we wanted. We were like, Fuck it, we’ll put 15 riffs in a song, and who cares if it’s 10 minutes long and won’t get on the radio? If it sounds cool, let’s just do it.

The song "War" is an original composition but uses lyrics from the Bob Marley & the Wailers song War.

== Recording ==
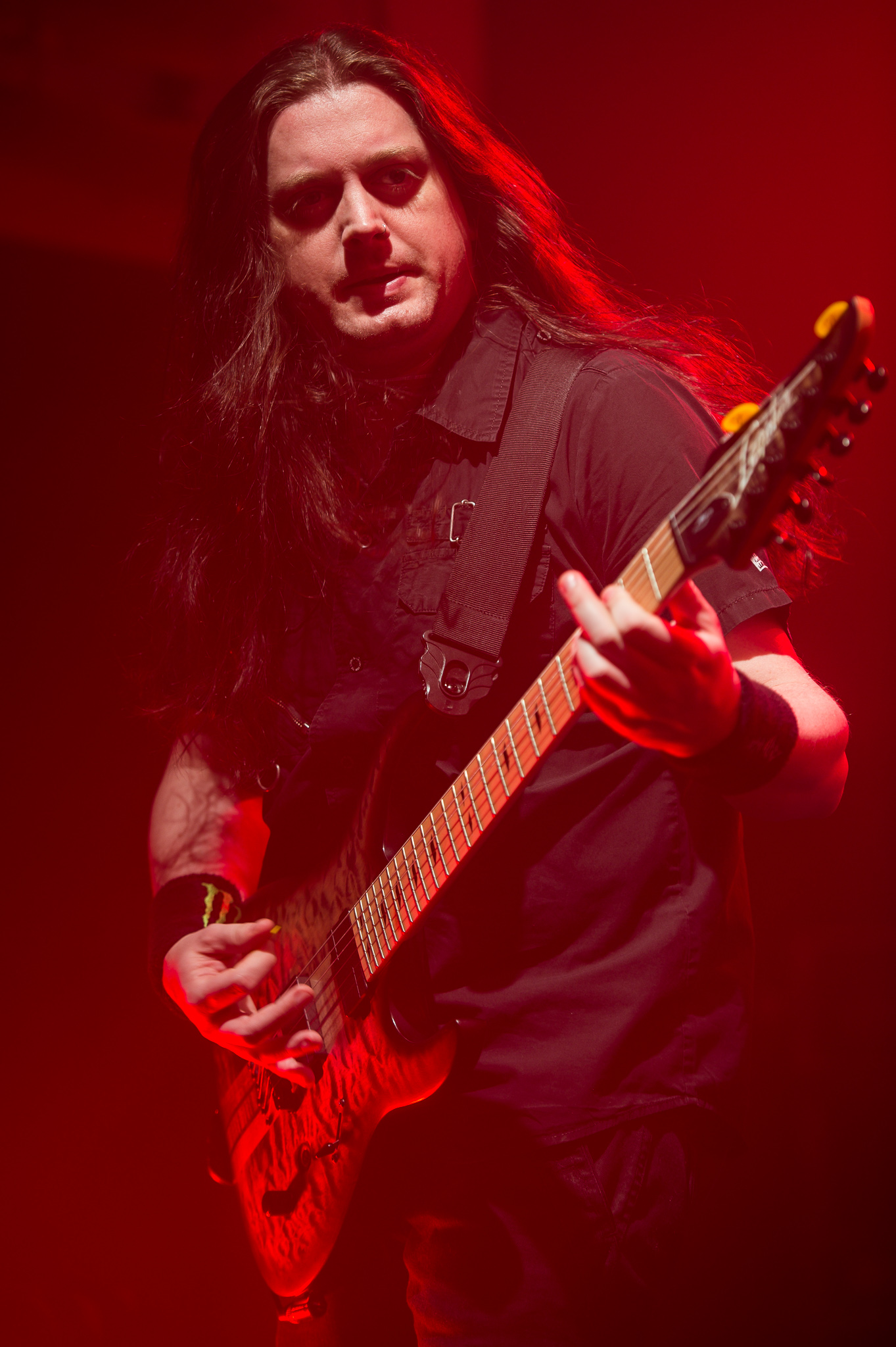
Guitarist Jonathan Donais composed a majority of the riffs and lead parts

Retribution was a return to the musically diverse style Shadows Fall displayed on their 2004 album The War Within. Lead guitarist Jonathan Donais stated, "To me, this is pretty much a combination of the five records we’ve already put out. We’ll always have a strong melodic side to us, but we left some of the heaviness out on the last record. I was happy to bring that back."

Donais composed most of the riffs for Retribution at his home in western Massachusetts, then shared them with Bachand, who helped refine the arrangements and record demo versions using a drum machine. Bachand also contributed a few songs such as "King of Nothing."

Donais also created all of the lead parts and fills on Retribution by looping rhythm guitar sections and improvising over them until he found ideas he liked. For solos, he typically used effects like an MXR Carbon Copy Analog Delay and a Dunlop Jimi Hendrix Wah. Rather than actively rocking the wah pedal, he often left it engaged to emphasize brighter, sharper tones especially during legato passages.

After Donais and Bachand completed the core songwriting for Retribution, they brought the material to bassist Paul Romanko and drummer Jason Bittner, who helped finalize the arrangements. Although the writing process progressed well, it took longer than expected due to a busy schedule. The band had live performances booked between writing sessions and was also in discussions with record labels about a new deal. Because of this, the material was still unfinished in January 2009 when they entered the studio with producer Zeuss, who had worked on most of their earlier releases prior to Threads of Life.

Lamb of God vocalist Randy Blythe features on the song "King of Nothing." Blythe who lived about two hours away from where the band recorded Retribution met with Shadows Fall to cook them dinner one night which led to the band asking him if he wanted to feature on album.

== Release and promotion ==
The first single "Still I Rise" was released on August 11, 2009. It was occupied by an official music video shot by Zack Merck in Affliction warehouse in southern California, in a MMA octagon with real fighters featuring in the video. Shadows Fall performed "Still I Rise" on Late Night with Jimmy Fallon on September 3, 2009.

The band Initially considered releasing Retribution through an independent metal label. However they ended up deciding to selfrelease the album on Everblack Industries. Ferret Records was hired to handle marketing and promotion, and ILG was assigned distribution. The deluxe edition of the album included covers of Ozzy Osbourne's "Bark At The Moon", Nuclear Assault's "Critical Mass" and Cro-Mags' "Age Of Quarrel", along with a DVD featuring the making of the album.

The album sold 13,000 copies in its first week and debuted at number 35 on the Billboard 200. Internationally the album debuted at number 98 in Canada, 160 in Japan and number 40 on the UK Rock and Metal chart.

Shadows Fall took part in the "Shock and Raw Tour" alongside Five Finger Death Punch, Otep and 2 Cents in late 2009 in support of the album.

== Critical reception ==
Professional ratings
Review scores
Source	Rating
411mania	8.0/10 stars
Ultimate Guitar	8.3/10
AllMusic	3.5/5 stars
Blabbermouth.net	8.5/10 stars
Blistering	8/10 stars
Rock Sound	7/10 stars

Retribution received positive reviews from critics. Greg Prato of AllMusic wrote "Retribution follows the same game plan as latter-day Shadows Fall releases -- raging metal tempered with some melody. And it takes very little time to show that guitarist Jonathan Donais is a frontrunner in the "modern-day six-string gymnastics" department, as he gets downright Yngwie on us with his solo in "My Demise." Ultimate Guitar credited Brian Fair’s song writing stating " Fair's lyrics have always had a bit of a spiritual and enlightened bend to them and he's keeping in line with what we expect from him. It's as though Fair's lyrical declarations are the calm amid a storm of metal guitar work and a booming rhythm section."

Blabbermouth.net gave the album a 8.5/10 claiming "On "Retribution", Shadows Fall sounds like a band with a chip on its collective shoulder and something to prove, almost as if to reply to the naysayers with a resounding "Not so fast; we ain't dead, ya know!" It is an album made of those distinctively thick 'n thrashy riffs, as well as Brian Fair's mighty roar and increasingly versatile voice. It is also an album that deftly balances infectious melodies with monstrous aggression. Much of that aggression has to do with the sheer number of great riffs from Matt Bachandand Jonathan Donais."

== Track listing ==
All tracks are written by Shadows Fall, except where noted.

Track listing
No.	Title	Length
1.	"The Path to Imminent Ruin" (instrumental)	1:13
2.	"My Demise"	6:59
3.	"Still I Rise"	3:59
4.	"War"	3:40
5.	"King of Nothing" (featuring Randy Blythe)	4:15
6.	"The Taste of Fear"	4:08
7.	"Embrace Annihilation"	5:11
8.	"Picture Perfect"	3:55
9.	"A Public Execution"	6:07
10.	"Dead and Gone"	6:35
Total length:		46:02

Deluxe Edition bonus tracks
No.	Title	Length
11.	"Bark at the Moon" (Ozzy Osbourne cover)	4:14
12.	"Age of Quarrel" (Cro-Mags cover)	4:55
13.	"Critical Mass" (Nuclear Assault cover)	3:30

== Bonus DVD (Deluxe Edition) ==
=== Live songs ===
Live from Bonnaroo (Music & Arts Festival)

1. Failure of the Devout
2. A Public Execution
3. Thoughts Without Words

Live at The Crazy Donkey

1. The Power of I and I
2. Forevermore

=== Instructional videos ===
Guitar World

1. King of Nothing
2. Still I Rise
3. Tip: Alternate Picking
4. Tip: Downstroke
5. Tip: Leads
6. Tip: Vibrato

Drum Lesson

1. Still I Rise

== Personnel ==
Shadows Fall

- Brian Fair – lead vocals
- Jon Donais – lead guitar, backing vocals
- Matt Bachand – rhythm guitar, clean vocals
- Paul Romanko – bass
- Jason Bittner – drums

Additional performer

- Randy Blythe – guest vocals on "King of Nothing"

Production

- Produced by Zeuss and Shadows Fall
- Engineered and mixed by Zeuss
- Mastered by Alan Douches
- Vocals produced by Michael (Elvis) Baskette and engineered by Dave Holdredge
- Artwork and layout by Sons of Nero
- Photography by Jeremy Saffer

== Charts ==
Chart performance
Chart (2009)	Peak position
Canadian Albums (Nielsen SoundScan)	98
Japanese Albums (Oricon)	160
UK Rock & Metal Albums (Official Charts)	40
US Billboard 200	35
US Independent Albums (Billboard)	4
US Indie Store Album Sales (Billboard)	13
US Top Hard Rock Albums (Billboard)	3
US Top Rock Albums (Billboard)	11
