= Tony Mitchell (director) =

British-Canadian film and television director

Tony Mitchell (born 9 August 1961) is a British-Canadian film and television director, born in Toronto. He has directed many high-end event mini-series, movies and episodic television shows: "A.D. The Bible Continues" (2015), The Bible (2013), Atlantis (2011), Episodes 3.1, 3.3, of Primeval (2009), Flood (2007), and Supervolcano (2004) . He has also directed numerous award-winning factual documentaries: Threads of Life BBC1, Niagara Falls PBS/Channel 4, Wild Thing - Chimpanzee's Channel 4 and Ancient Egyptians Channel 4.

He holds both Canadian & British passports and a US Green Card, and has homes in London, Cape Town and Belfast.

He is married to Ailsa Orr and has two children, Darcy Mitchell and Taran Mitchell.

== Filmography ==
=== Films ===
- 2004: Supervolcano
- 2007: Flood
- 2011: Atlantis
- 2018: Grace and Goliath

=== Series ===
- 1996: TFI Fridays (13 episodes)
- 2009: Primeval (2 episodes)
- 2013: The Bible
- 2024: The Baxters
