= Cursum Perficio =

Studio album by Anthrax
- Released: September 18, 2026
- Recorded: 2023–2026
- Studio: Studio 606, Northridge
- Genres: Thrash metal; heavy metal; groove metal
- Length: 53:43
- Labels: Nuclear Blast; Megaforce
- Producers: Jay Ruston; Anthrax

Anthrax chronology
XL (2022)	Cursum Perficio (2026)

Anthrax studio chronology
For All Kings (2016)	Cursum Perficio (2026)

Singles from Cursum Perficio
- 1. "It's for the Kids" Released: May 15, 2026; 2. "The Edge of Perfection" Released: July 10, 2026; 3. "Everybody's Got a Plan" Released: August 6, 2026

Cursum Perficio is the twelfth studio album by American thrash metal band Anthrax, released on September 18, 2026. It is the band's first studio album since For All Kings (2016), making it the longest gap between two albums in their career. This album is the band's first since The Greater of Two Evils (2004) not to feature a lineup change from the previous album.

== Background and recording ==
When asked in May 2018 if Anthrax had begun working on their twelfth studio album, guitarist Scott Ian stated, "Very, very, very preliminary stages. There's a couple of really great riffs. Charlie's sent around some really great ideas. But we haven't actually started working on anything. We've just been too busy touring." A month later, bassist Frank Bello claimed that Anthrax had intended to be back in the studio by mid-2018, but because they agreed to open for Slayer on their farewell tour, they were not expected to start writing their new album until 2019 at the earliest.

After years of false starts and stops, Anthrax entered the studio in the spring of 2023 to begin recording their twelfth studio album. Frontman Joey Belladonna began recording his vocals on November 5, 2023, and production of the album continued within another two years. Although Bello had stated the album would be in the fall of 2025, it was left unfinished by the middle of the year, with drummer Charlie Benante revealing that the band had thrown "out a bunch of old tunes and made some new ones that destroy the older ones", and Belladonna claiming he had "maybe two or three more" songs left to record. Bello confirmed in July 2025 that the album was in the mixing stages, and Benante announced the same month that a new Anthrax song would be released before the end of the year. Bello announced in February 2026 that the album would be released in May of that year, though Benante later clarified that it would be released in September while the first single would be released in May. In a March 2026 interview with Bravewords.com, Ian and Benante revealed Cursum Perficio as the title of the album.

== Title meaning ==
Despite the album's title, which is translated as "My journey has come to an end", "My journey is over" or "I complete my journey" in Latin, the members of Anthrax have clarified that this would not be their final studio album. In March 2026, drummer Charlie Benante commented on the meaning of the album title:

There was a whole idea going around about, all the four bands, the Big 4 bands, kind of getting to the point where, "Wow, this may be the time that this could be the last record". And I was watching this Marilyn Monroe documentary. She has this plaque in her house, which said, "Cursum Perficio" which means "My journey has come to an end" or "My journey is over". And we were talking, and "What about this?". We don't really have to say that this is the end.

However, in an interview given to Rolling Stone Brasil about two weeks before its release, guitarist Scott Ian hinted that Cursum Perficio may be the band's final album: "I don't know if we'll make another album. We're going to release this album and then tour for two years. And then we'll all be 65 and we'll see how we feel. We might also just release individual songs. Who knows?"

== Release and promotion ==
On May 11, 2026, Anthrax announced that Cursum Perficio would be released on September 18, 2026, with the first single "It's for the Kids" being released on May 15.

On June 8, 2026, guitarist Scott Ian hailed the song "The Edge of Perfection" as "the greatest Anthrax song in the history of Anthrax." The band then revealed "The Edge of Perfection" to be the second single from the album, and was released on July 10, 2026.

On August 6, 2026, the album's third single, "Everybody's Got a Plan", was released.

Prior to the release of Cursum Perficio, the band (along with Exodus) opened for Megadeth on the Canadian leg of their final tour in February and March 2026, and they also supported Iron Maiden on select dates to the North American leg of their Run for Your Lives World Tour that fall.

A day before the album was released, the band premiered the music video for the title track "Cursum Perficio" via Rolling Stone.

== Track listing ==
All tracks are written by Anthrax (Joey Belladonna, Frank Bello, Charlie Benante and Scott Ian), except where noted.

Cursum Perficio track listing
No.	Title	Writer(s)	Length
1.	"Persistence of Memory"	Anthrax, Blair Daly	1:07
2.	"The Long Goodbye"		5:34
3.	"It's for the Kids"		4:20
4.	"Everybody's Got a Plan"		4:36
5.	"The Edge of Perfection"	Anthrax, Daly	6:46
6.	"Infectious"	Anthrax, Daly	5:16
7.	"NYC 93"		4:48
8.	"Cursum Perficio"		6:08
9.	"T.O.M.B."		4:31
10.	"Watch It Go"	Anthrax, Daly	5:43
11.	"My Victory"		4:54
Total length:			53:43

== Personnel ==
Anthrax

- Joey Belladonna – vocals
- Jonathan Donais – lead guitar
- Scott Ian – rhythm guitar
- Frank Bello – bass
- Charlie Benante – drums

Production

- Jay Ruston – production, mixing
- Anthrax – production
- Paul Logus – mastering

== Charts ==
Chart performance for Cursum Perficio
Chart (2026)	Peak position
Australian Albums (ARIA)	24
Austrian Albums (Ö3 Austria)	5
Belgian Albums (Ultratop Flanders)	24
Belgian Albums (Ultratop Wallonia)	6
Dutch Albums (Album Top 100)	36
Finnish Albums (Suomen virallinen lista)	5
French Albums (SNEP)	57
French Rock & Metal Albums (SNEP)	2
German Albums (Offizielle Top 100)	5
German Rock & Metal Albums (Offizielle Top 100)	2
Hungarian Physical Albums (MAHASZ)	7
Irish Independent Albums (IRMA)	22
Italian Physical Albums (FIMI)	10
Japanese Albums (Oricon)	32
Japanese Download Albums (Billboard Japan)	29
New Zealand Albums (RMNZ)	35
Norwegian Physical Albums (IFPI Norge)	1
Norwegian Rock Albums (IFPI Norge)	9
Polish Albums (ZPAV)	18
Scottish Albums (Official Charts)	8
Spanish Albums (Promusicae)	30
Swedish Albums (Sverigetopplistan)	5
Swedish Hard Rock Albums (Sverigetopplistan)	1
Swiss Albums (Schweizer Hitparade)	4
UK Albums (Official Charts)	46
UK Independent Albums (Official Charts)	5
UK Rock & Metal Albums (Official Charts)	1
US Billboard 200	27
US Independent Albums (Billboard)	3
US Top Rock & Alternative Albums (Billboard)	6
