= Scorched (Overkill album) =

2023 studio album by Overkill

Studio album by Overkill
- Released: April 14, 2023
- Recorded: 2020–2022
- Studios: Gear Recording Studio, Shrewsbury, New Jersey; SKH Recording Studios, Stuart, Florida; JRod Productions, Pomona, New York; The Recording Company, Sloansville, New York
- Genre: Thrash metal
- Length: 51:05
- Label: Nuclear Blast

Overkill chronology
The Wings of War (2019)	Scorched (2023)

Singles from Scorched
- 1. "The Surgeon" Released: January 27, 2023; 2. "Wicked Place" Released: March 14, 2023

Professional ratings
Review scores
Source	Rating
Blabbermouth.net	8/10
Classic Rock	4/5 stars
KNAC.com	4.8/5 stars
Metal Forces	8.5/10
Metal Hammer (UK)	8/10
Metal Injection	7/10

Scorched is the twentieth studio album by thrash metal band Overkill, released on April 14, 2023. It is the band's first studio album in four years, following The Wings of War (2019), the longest gap between studio albums for the band. This is also the last Overkill album to feature drummer Jason Bittner, who left the band in August 2024.

The album was praised by critics. Globalmetalblog.com wrote that "we're dealing with a slab of steel as solid as they come."

== Background ==
Overkill had announced plans to work on the follow-up to The Wings of War as early as October 2019. Progress on the album had slowly been taking shape for more than two years, with bassist D.D. Verni having written nine songs for the album by April 2020, and the band began recording it in September. Drum tracks had been finished by that October, and mixing was handled by Colin Richardson, who had previously worked with Overkill in the late 1990s and early 2000s. Mastering was done by Maor Appelbaum.

The release date of Scorched was postponed on numerous occasions, partly due to the COVID-19 pandemic. The album was intended to be released in April 2021, but it was soon pushed back to the summer or fall of 2021, and then later to early 2022, and finally to the spring of 2023.

== Track listing ==
All tracks are written by D.D. Verni and Bobby "Blitz" Ellsworth.

Scorched track listing
No.	Title	Length
1.	"Scorched"	6:13
2.	"Goin' Home"	4:31
3.	"The Surgeon"	5:33
4.	"Twist of the Wick"	5:34
5.	"Wicked Place"	5:00
6.	"Won't Be Comin' Back"	4:30
7.	"Fever"	5:33
8.	"Harder They Fall"	4:23
9.	"Know Her Name"	5:11
10.	"Bag o' Bones"	4:37
Total length:		51:05

== Personnel ==
=== Overkill ===
- Bobby "Blitz" Ellsworth – vocals
- D.D. Verni – bass
- Dave Linsk – lead guitar
- Derek Tailer – rhythm guitar
- Jason Bittner – drums

== Charts ==
Chart performance for Scorched
Chart (2023)	Peak position
Austrian Albums (Ö3 Austria)	29
Belgian Albums (Ultratop Flanders)	154
Belgian Albums (Ultratop Wallonia)	147
French Albums (SNEP)	164
German Albums (Offizielle Top 100)	10
Japanese Hot Albums (Billboard Japan)	64
Polish Albums (ZPAV)	13
Scottish Albums (Official Charts)	12
Spanish Albums (Promusicae)	66
Swiss Albums (Schweizer Hitparade)	7
UK Album Downloads (Official Charts)	54
UK Independent Albums (Official Charts)	7
UK Rock & Metal Albums (Official Charts)	4
US Current Album Sales (Billboard)	12
