= Isadora Verwey =

South African actress

- Born: Isadora Verwey; South Africa
- Education: University of Stellenbosch; University of Cape Town
- Occupations: Actress, Presenter, Voice over artist
- Years active: 1982–present
- Height: 1.74 m (5 ft 9 in)
- Father: Louw Verwey

Isadora Verwey is a South African actress, presenter and voice over artist. She is best known for the roles in the films, Atlantis: End of a World, Birth of a Legend, Kantlyn and television serials, Getroud met rugby and 7de Laan.

== Personal life ==
Her father Louw Verwey was also an actor. He was born on 17 February 1930. His notable roles came through the films; The Gods Must Be Crazy and My Naam is Dingetjie. Isadora studied at the Drama Department, University of Stellenbosch. Then she completed a Performers’ Diploma at the University of Cape Town.

== Career ==
From 1982 to 1986 during her university life, she performed in many stage plays such as; Equus (1982), Oidipus (1982), Die Keiser (1983), The Crucible (1983), Die Van Aardes van Grootoor (1984), The Trojan Women (1984), Liefdeskringloop (1985), Spring Awakening (1984), and The Caucasian Chalk Circle (1986). Then she joined with theatre companies such as Blue Moon, Shoestring, and Hecate and performed in the plays such as: El Grande de Coca-Cola, Is die Muis Baas, Kombuis Blues, The Adventures of Gilgamesh, n Brommer in die Boord (1989), Liewe Heksie (1990), Oedipus (1990), Die Nag van Legio (1990), Kloue (1991), Die Groot Wit Roos (1991), Nag, Generaal (1991), Flikflooie (1991), Macbeth (1992), Hospitaal op Horings (1992), 'n Lam vir die Pase (1993), Die Kwinkslaers (1994), Die Pakkamer (1996), Griet Skryf 'n Sprokie (1997), Twelfth Night, or What You Will (1998), Vlerkdans (1999), Jack and the Beanstalk (1999), Adamas (2000), Skroot (2000), Pendoring (Edms) Beperk (2002), and Fringe Benefits (2006).

In 1988, she won the award for Best Young Actress at the Cobus Roussouw Bursary. Then in 1992, she won the IGI Life Vita Award for Best Actress for her role in the play Lady Macbeth. In 1993, she won Piers Nicholson Award for involvement in theatre in the Orange Free State. Again in 1996, she was awarded the FNB Vita Best Supporting Actress Award for her role in the serial Die Pak Kamer. In 2000, she received Vita Award Nomination for the play El Grande de Coca-Cola. In 2009, she played the role of "Miem" in the play Mis. In 2012, she performed the role of "Ma Let" in the play Mooi Maria. For her role in the 2010 Afrikaans play Mooi Maria, she received the Aardklop Nomination for Best Actress.

In 2000, she played the role as "Ragel" on the kykNET soap opera Villa Rosa. The role became very popular, where she continued to play the role for 00 years. Then in 2009, she started to play the role of "Saartjie", Patrick's secretary, in the SABC2 mini-series Hopeville, where she continued to act from March to April. After that, she starred in the SABC2 drama series Erfsondes, where she played the main role "Dankie Hek" for its second season. In 2011, she acted in the film Atlantis: End of a World, Birth of a Legend which was economically successful, but received negative reviews from critics.

== Filmography ==
Year	Film	Role	Genre	Ref.
1993	Die Manakwalanners	Wesselina van Eeden	TV series	
1994	Die Manakwalanners 2	Wesselina van Eeden	TV series	
2004	Zero Tolerance	Mary Rich	TV series	
2005	Gabriël	Eureka Koekemoer	TV series	
2006	Kompleks	Breunanda Snyman	TV series	
2008	Wild at Heart	Tina	TV series	
2009	Hopeville	Saartjie	TV series	
2009	Getroud met rugby	Vaugheen	TV series	
2011	Atlantis: End of a World, Birth of a Legend	Bansabira	TV movie	
2013	Erfsondes	Dankie Hek	TV series	
2013	High Rollers	Chantel Williams	TV series	
2014	Pandjieswinkelstories	Mrs. Wiid	TV series	
2016	The Journey Is the Destination	Artist Friend	Film	
2017	Die Byl	Brumilda	TV series	
2018	7de Laan	Elsa Winterbach	TV series	
2019	Lui maar op, Belinda	Berdine	TV series	
2019	Lui Maar Op, Belinda	Berdine	TV series	
2020	Suidooster	Wilmien	TV series	
2021	Kantlyn	Ouma Botha	TV movie	
