= Flood (2007 film) =

Film by Tony Mitchell

- British DVD cover for Flood
- Directed by: Tony Mitchell
- Written by: Justin Bodle; Matthew Cope; Nick Morley
- Based on: Flood by Richard Doyle
- Produced by: Justin Bodle
- Starring: Robert Carlyle; Tom Courtenay; David Suchet; Jessalyn Gilsig
- Cinematography: Pierre Jodoin
- Edited by: Simon Webb
- Music by: Debbie Wiseman
- Production companies: Moonlighting Films; Muse Entertainment; Power
- Distributed by: Lionsgate
- Release date: 24 August 2007
- Running time: 110 minutes
- Countries: United Kingdom; South Africa; Canada
- Language: English
- Budget: $24 million
- Box office: $8.272 million

Flood is a 2007 British–Canadian disaster film, directed by Tony Mitchell. It features Robert Carlyle, Jessalyn Gilsig, David Suchet and Tom Courtenay and is mainly set in London, England. It is based on the novel of the same name by Richard Doyle.

== Plot ==
A storm surge travels between the United Kingdom and mainland Europe, raising sea levels at the same time as the spring tide. Several parts of Scotland are devastated as a result, including Wick.

The Met Office's head forecaster, Keith Hopkins, mistakenly believes the storm will head towards the Netherlands. However, Leonard Morrison, a marine physics professor who has based his career on believing that the Thames barrier was built in the wrong place, disproves Hopkins' theory with his independent but sophisticated computer model - which predicts that the storm and spring tide would merge to form a 46 metre-high surge. After a series of misinformed meetings with Deputy Prime Minister Campbell (who becomes outraged at the inaccurate forecasts) Hopkins feels guilt ridden as valuable time has been wasted. During a last-minute meeting at COBRA (Cabinet Office Briefing Rooms) in Whitehall, the authorities realise that Central London would be inundated in three hours. Campbell declares a state of emergency, which on the short notice causes severe panic and congestion in the city.

As the COBRA authorities and military forces struggle to evacuate over one million people from the city, Police Commissioner Patricia Nash is designated the emergency coordinator by Campbell and works with the rest of the team, including Major General Ashcroft, transport chief Johnson, and a guilt-stricken Hopkins.

Leonard travels to the barrier where he meets his estranged son Rob, an engineer, and Rob's ex-wife Sam, the barrier manager. Sam oversees raising the barrier, but the tsunami arrives and overwhelms it. The flood sweeps into the city, destroying everything in its path. Rob and Sam jump into the Thames to escape the swamped barrier, whilst Leonard is saved by a military helicopter and taken to Whitehall to advise COBRA.

Rob and Sam end up with other survivors in the London Underground. They meet two maintenance workers, Bill and Zack, but when the surge floods the station, Bill drowns whilst sealing a door to save everyone else. The group escape to the surface via a vertical shaft and find themselves in the flooded Trafalgar Square, where Rob and Sam contact Leonard. They return with him to the barrier, where Leonard believes the water flow can be reversed back out of London, as the tide has turned and the water level is starting to recede.

General Ashcroft disagrees and lobbies the Prime Minister to authorise an air strike to destroy the barrier, hoping to create a surge to push the water back out of London. Hopkins, feeling guilty about the thousands of casualties, disappears and dies by suicide. Nash clashes with Ashcroft, wanting to give the Morrisons a chance to remedy the situation.

Rob, Sam and Leonard discover the controls to initiate the reverse flow are now underwater. They realise someone can activate them, but they will likely die doing so. As Rob and Sam try to decide which of them should go, Leonard quietly makes the choice for them by going himself. He is successful in activating the controls but loses his oxygen supply and drowns whilst doing so. As the air strike is aborted and the floods recede, Rob is consoled by Sam as Morrison's body is recovered, who is among the over 200,000 casualties in the disaster. Campbell holds a radio broadcast to the survivors in the city, assuring them that London will survive and recover.

== Cast ==
- Robert Carlyle as Rob Morrison
- Jessalyn Gilsig as Sam Morrison
- Tom Courtenay as Professor Leonard Morrison
- Joanne Whalley as Commissioner Patricia Nash
- David Suchet as Deputy Prime Minister Campbell
- Nigel Planer as Keith Hopkins
- Poppy Miller as Nikki Fuller
- Ralph Brown as Neil Stafford
- Jade Davidson as Mel Stafford
- Pip Torrens as Army Liaison Officer Richardson
- David Hayman as Major General Ashcroft
- Gottfried John as Arthur Moyes
- Nathalie Boltt as Kate Morrison
- Giorgio Lupano as Toni Lombardi
- Angus Barnett as Bill
- Tom Hardy as Zack
- Susan Wooldridge as Penny
- John Benfield as Frank
- Martin Ball as Wyatt
- Moira Lister as Elderly Gran
- Cecilia Dazzi as Anna
- Sara Langridge as Claire

== Production ==
The film was shot on location in London for two weeks and in South Africa for 11 weeks. It is notable for the use of intricate production design and special effects in depicting famous London landmarks such as the London Underground, Houses of Parliament and The O2 being partially submerged under water.

Twenty-six studio sets were constructed with built-in water effects to shoot the actors in a wide range of flood sequences. Miniature sets in water tanks were used to shoot larger flooded buildings such as the Thames Barrier, London Underground and car parks. Computer generated visual effects were used to create shots of flooded London by combining shots of London with digitally created water. Locations in Cape Town were used for Whitehall, the Scottish coastline, London Underground and the Thames Barrier.

== Release ==
A 110-minute version of the film was given a limited theatrical release in the UK, premiering on 24 August 2007 and was released on DVD in the UK in October 2007. An extended two-part TV version was screened on ITV1 on May 4 and 5 2008 and released on DVD in the United States in September 2008 and in the United Kingdom in October 2008. It also played as a mini-series in Lithuania, Spain, Italy, the United States (via Ion Television), New Zealand, South Africa, Canada, Finland and Denmark. The extended version was repeated on ITV3 on 10 and 11 January 2009.

=== Critical response ===
Flood was received negatively by critics. Anna Smith at the BBC gave the film 3 out of 5 stars, with the reviewer calling it "an American disaster movie on rather sodden British soil." Susan Stewart of the New York Times found that "a few moments of fine acting are dwarfed by the over-the-top special effects" in what she termed an "overwrought and simplistic production", though praised some of the acting. Writing in his column for the Daily Star, Mike Ward termed the film as "ridiculous bilge": "corny characters, laughable lines, po-faced performances, Robert Carlisle speaking in a weird new accent […] sorry, it was all just way too funny". The Guardian called it an "uneven attempt at a disaster movie" and "a bit of a damp squib".
