= Threads of Life =

Studio album by Shadows Fall
- Released: April 3, 2007
- Recorded: September 2006
- Studios: Studio 606 (Northridge, California)
- Genres: Metalcore, thrash metal, death metal
- Length: 49:07
- Labels: Atlantic, Roadrunner
- Producer: Nick Raskulinecz

Shadows Fall chronology
The War Within (2004)	Threads of Life (2007)	Retribution (2009)

Singles from Threads of Life
- 1. "Redemption" Released: February 14, 2007; 2. "Another Hero Lost" Released: October 2007; 3. "Forevermore" Released: July 2008

Professional ratings
Review scores
Source	Rating
411mania	8/10 stars
About.com	4/5 stars
AllMusic	4/5 stars
AbsolutePunk	76%
Alternative Press	4.5/5 stars
Blabbermouth.net	8/10 stars
Kerrang!	5/5 stars
IGN	8.2/10 stars
Metal Hammer	8/10 stars
MetalSucks	4/5 stars
The Phoenix	3/4 stars
Spin	7/10 stars
Sputnikmusic	4/5 stars

Threads of Life is the fifth studio album by American heavy metal band Shadows Fall. Released on April 3, 2007, in the U.S. through Atlantic Records, the album debuted at number 46 on the Billboard 200. The first single, "Redemption", made its premiere on Sirius Radio's Hard Attack station on February 16, 2007 and was released on iTunes on February 20. "Redemption" received a Grammy Award nomination for Best Metal Performance at the 50th Grammy Awards.

== Background ==
Shadows Fall signed with Atlantic Records for this release marking their major label debut. The album was released outside of the U.S. through Roadrunner Records. This is the band's only album with these two record labels. The ballad "Another Hero Lost," was inspired by the death of Brian Fair's cousin, who was stationed in Iraq.

== Recording ==
The band entered the studio during September 2006, to begin recording the album. It was recorded at Dave Grohl's Studio 606 in Northridge, a community located in Los Angeles, California. The band overwrote for this album, and ended up bringing thirteen songs to the studio. According to Brian Fair, this was the first time the band had more than enough material for a record. Threads of Life was the first and only Shadows Fall album to be produced by Nick Raskulinecz, known for working with Foo Fighters and Velvet Revolver. Raskulinecz grew up listening to thrash metal, according to Fair, and thus fit well with the sound the band was looking to create. The deviation from Zeuss, who has produced most of the band's albums, was explained by bassist Paul Romanko in an interview:

When Zeuss and I talked and we just kind of came to the conclusion that it was time to pull someone else in. We kind of felt like the idea’s pool had kind of dried up a little bit, we were finishing each other’s sentences.

The album was still mixed by Zeuss, allowing for some familiarity, and Romanko notes that it was Zeuss himself who originally suggested the change. The label, Atlantic Records, had no influence musically on the album. The label did not hear the album until after it was mastered. In regards to the overall recording process, Fair commented, "We didn’t write a safe record."

== Release and promotion ==
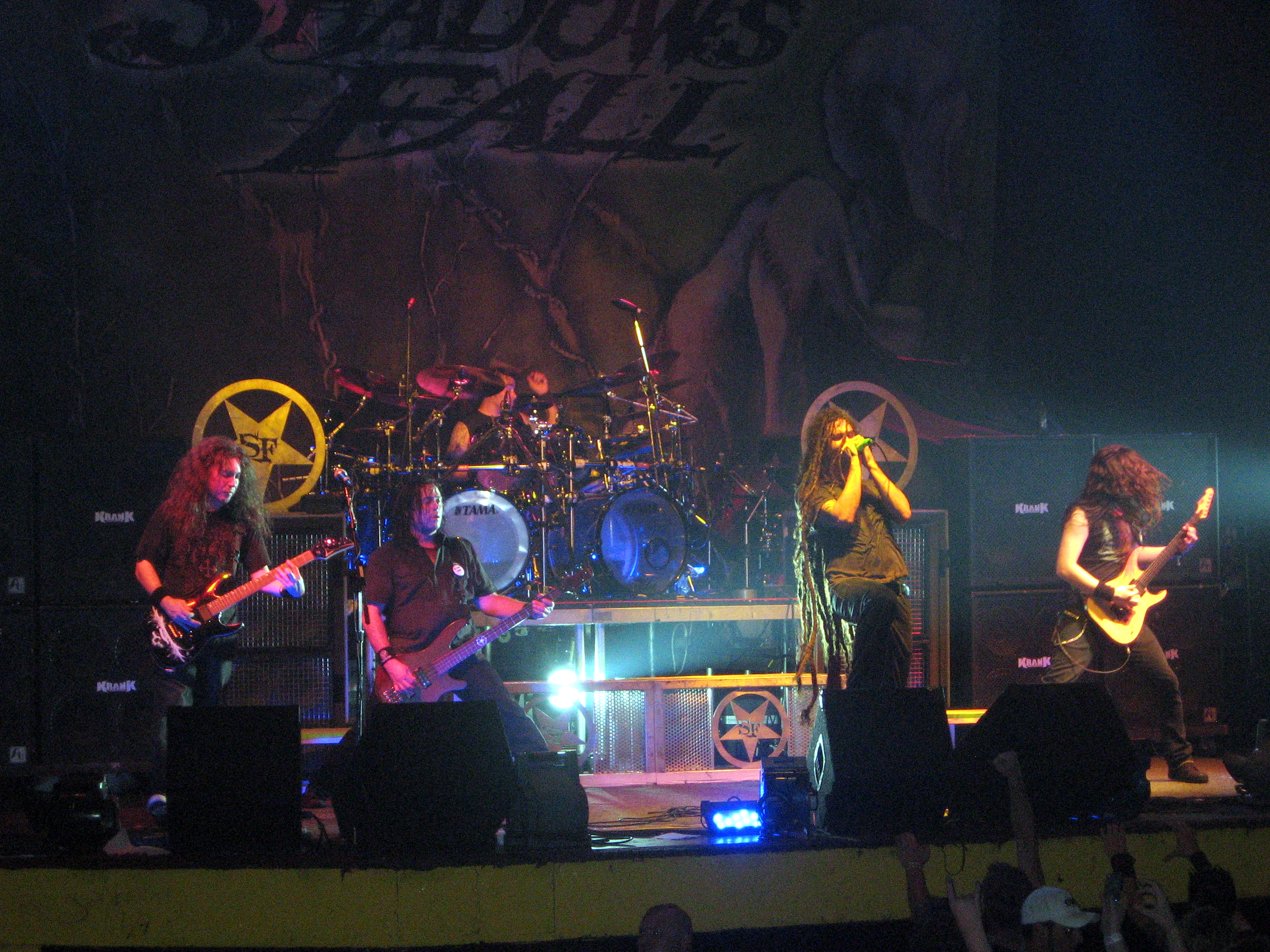
Shadows Fall live in Detroit while touring in support of Threads of Life

The single "Redemption" was released on February 14, 2007, and went on to reach number 37 on the US mainstream rock chart. The official music video premiered on March 26, on MTV2.

Throughout the buildup to the album’s release Shadows Fall released a multi part webisode series showing the making of the Threads of Life. The group also recorded an interview with RoadRunner Record in promotion of the album. On the album’s release day on April 3, they made an in store appearance at Meriden Mall in Connecticut and the following on in April 4, they made an addition appearance at a Best Buy in Boston, Massachusetts. On April 16, they were featured guests on the nationally syndicated radio show Rockline.

Threads of Life sold approximately 24,000 copies in its first week peaking at number 46 on the Billboard 200. Shortly before the new album’s release, the band’s biggest supporters at Atlantic, including their A&R man, were laid off by the record company. Leading the band to not get much attention from the label afterwards. Guitarst later told Guitar World in 2010: "Being ignored like that was terribly frustrating, the people that ended up working the album didn’t even like metal and didn’t know how to sell it because it wasn’t their scene." Shadows Fall would then return to an independent label for their follow up album Retribution.

Shadows Fall toured in support of Threads of Life, including making appearances at the Jägermeister tour with Stone Sour and Lacuna Coil, the Operation Annihilation tour with Static-X, 3 Inches of Blood, and Divine Heresy, and the Black Crusade tour with Trivium, Machine Head, DragonForce, and Arch Enemy. The band was a part of the Soundwave tour in Australia and in Asia in February 2008, along with Killswitch Engage, As I Lay Dying, and Bleeding Through.

== Reception ==
Threads of Life received positive reviews from critics. Alternative Press stated, "Threads of Life is the most unashamedly 'true' metal album any major label's released yet this year — and it's also one of the best." MetalSucks complimented the band's effort stating, "Threads of Life is exactly what you would expect from Shadows Fall — aggressive thrash riffing and Swedish death-metal inspired guitar interplay underneath Brian Fair’s assortment of screams, singing, and something halfway in between the two — only this time the band has refined their songwriting abilities even further and lets their ’80s hair metal influences hang out even more." The Phoenix added to this praise, "Threads of Life is rife with catchy, immaculately produced riffs, and singer Brian Fair has refined the gruff bellow heard on previous albums into a competently tuneful Hetfeldian growl; the call-and-response between Fair and the syrupy, multi-tracked clean singing of guitarist Matt Bachand sounds better than ever."

A reviewer from Ultimate Guitar gave the album an 9.7/10 stating "It seems like Shadows Fall has finally found their step again. This album could top The War Within, but if it does not, it is definetly [sic] a high quality album from these guys. Redemption, Forevermore and Final Call are songs that stand out to me the most because of just how insanely crazy and difficult the riffs sound. There is absoultely [sic] nothing that I hate about this album."

Several critics addressed the more mainstream sound of the album. Blabbermouth provided a good summary, "The band has hit that very elusive line between broadening the appeal of the music and selling out completely – talk about the art of balance!" 411Mania added that "the production could of [sic] been a bit more gritty and had more of an edge to it." Perhaps the largest critic in this aspect was Vince Neilstein of MetalSucks, who criticized the "overwhelming presence of auto-tune on Brian Fair’s voice during the clean sung parts," concluding that it overly detracted from the listening experience.

"Redemption" received a Grammy Award nomination for Best Metal Performance during December 2007. Brian Fair explained, "The song is a celebration of the power of music and the human voice as an agent of change and to have it recognized in such a way is incredible." The 50th Grammy Awards took place on February 12, 2008, with the award ultimately going to Slayer. Other nominees in the category were King Diamond, Machine Head, and As I Lay Dying.

== Track listing ==
All tracks are written by Shadows Fall, except where noted.

No.	Title	Length
1.	"Redemption"	4:17
2.	"Burning the Lives"	4:04
3.	"Storm Winds"	4:50
4.	"Failure of the Devout"	5:25
5.	"Venomous"	3:31
6.	"Another Hero Lost"	4:04
7.	"Final Call"	6:48
8.	"Dread Uprising"	4:14
9.	"The Great Collapse" (instrumental)	1:38
10.	"Just Another Nightmare"	4:55
11.	"Forevermore"	5:21
Total length:		49:07

FYE bonus track
No.	Title	Length
12.	"Stupid Crazy"	4:40

Best Buy bonus tracks
No.	Title	Length
12.	"Fade Into Smoke"	4:04
13.	"Dread Uprising" (Live rehearsal)	4:07

iTunes bonus tracks
No.	Title	Length
12.	"Redemption" (Live rehearsal)	4:20
13.	"Venomous" (Live rehearsal)	3:30

Miscellaneous bonus tracks
No.	Title	Length
14.	"Fury of the Storm" (from WWE Wreckless Intent)	3:37
15.	"Blood of Destiny" (from God of War II Official Soundtrack)	2:44

== Personnel ==
Shadows Fall

- Brian Fair – lead vocals
- Jon Donais – lead guitar, backing vocals
- Matt Bachand – rhythm guitar, clean vocals
- Paul Romanko – bass
- Jason Bittner – drums

Production

- Produced by Nick Raskulinecz
- Mixed by Zeuss
- Engineered by Paul Fig
- Mastered by Ted Jensen
- A&R by John Rubeli and Anthony Delia
- Second engineering by John Lousteau and additional engineering by Nick Raskulinecz
- "Dread Uprising" live rehearsal mixed and mastered by Chris Athens

== Chart positions ==
Album

Year	Chart	Peak
2007	The Billboard 200	46
2007	Rock Albums	12
2007	Tastemaker Albums	7
2007	Japanese Albums Chart	95

Singles

Year	Single	Chart	Position
2007	"Redemption"	Mainstream Rock Tracks	37
2007	"Another Hero Lost"	Mainstream Rock Tracks	40
