= Richard Doyle (author) =

British author of thriller novels

- Born: 10 January 1948; Saint Saviour, Guernsey
- Died: 22 June 2017 (aged 69)
- Occupation: Novelist
- Writing career
- Genres: Thriller, non-fiction

Richard Doyle (10 January 1948 – 22 June 2017) was a British author of thriller novels.

== Biography ==
Doyle was born in Saint Saviour, Guernsey, and on his third birthday was presented at the court of Emperor Haile Selassie. He lived variously in Tripoli, Ethiopia, Kuwait, Kenya, Morocco, Libya, Beirut, Barbados, Antigua, France, Greece, Ireland, and the United States. Home for several years was a plantation house in the West Indies, then on Cape Ann, followed by a fortified bastide in Gascony. He spent a short time at Rugby School before completing his studies at the British Army school in Tripoli. He went on to read law at Lincoln College, Oxford. As a young man he taught English to the Colombian author Gabriel García Márquez.

Deluge, Doyle's first novel, was published in 1976. Imperial 109 was published the following year and became a wild success in both the United Kingdom and the United States, selling over a million copies. His 2002 novel Flood was a best-seller and was adapted for the 2007 film of the same title. He was considered an expert on matters related to climate change and the flooding of London. He was invited to the "London Under Water" lecture from the Royal Geographical Society's "21st Century Challenges" series in June 2008.

Doyle was expelled from Tripoli by military coup, lectured on fighter training to the Italian Air Force and survived several earthquakes, two hurricanes, and a tsunami. He appeared regularly on radio and TV, talking about the flood threat, climate change, writing and his own life.

Doyle lived with his wife Sally and son Caspar in Oxford. Both Doyle and his son Caspar are keen yachtsmen.

== Bibliography ==
- Deluge (1976)
- Imperial 109 (1977)
- Pacific Clipper (1987)
- Havana Special (1982)
- Executive Action (1998)
- Flood (2002)
- Volcano (2006)
- Mute (2012) eBook
