= For All Kings =

2016 studio album by Anthrax

Studio album by Anthrax
- Released: February 26, 2016
- Recorded: 2014–2015
- Studios: TRS West (Sherman Oaks, California); Serenity West Recording (Hollywood, California); Steakhouse Studios (Burbank, California); Downtown Music Studios (New York City); Swing House Studios (Los Angeles, California)
- Genres: Thrash metal; heavy metal; groove metal
- Length: 59:34
- Labels: Megaforce; Nuclear Blast
- Producer: Jay Ruston

Anthrax chronology
Anthems (2013)	For All Kings (2016)	Kings Among Scotland (2018)

Anthrax studio chronology
Worship Music (2011)	For All Kings (2016)	Cursum Perficio (2026)

Singles from For All Kings
- 1. "Evil Twin" Released: October 26, 2015; 2. "Breathing Lightning" Released: 2016; 3. "Monster at the End" Released: 2016

For All Kings is the eleventh studio album by American heavy metal band Anthrax, released on February 26, 2016. It is the band's first studio album to feature Jon Donais on lead guitar, replacing Rob Caggiano. The album artwork was designed by Alex Ross.

== Background ==
In January 2013, guitarist Rob Caggiano left Anthrax and was replaced by Jon Donais of Shadows Fall. Talk of a follow-up to Worship Music surfaced later that year, with bassist Frank Bello stating that the band was "getting the itch to write new music". In September that year, guitarist Scott Ian confirmed that Bello and drummer Charlie Benante were "coming over to start writing for the next record" and subsequently posted images on Twitter of the band working on new material. By the end of October, the band had arranged seven new songs, with Ian describing the direction of the new music as "aggressive, fast, even riff-ier than the last record". By February 2014, the band had a total of 12 songs written, though were continuing to write so that they would have more material to choose from for inclusion on the final album.

Recording began in late 2014 with producer Jay Ruston in a studio in Los Angeles. Some 15–20 more songs were written during the sessions, what the band considered its most productive period. "Soror Irrumator", a song scheduled to appear on For All Kings, was featured on the second volume of the Catch the Throne mixtape. A lyric video for the song "Evil Twin" was released in October 2015, and several days later, the album title was announced. The album's release date and front cover were revealed the following month. The artwork, created by Alex Ross on a suggestion by Benante, displays massive statues of the band members. The track listing was revealed on December 4. Despite earlier suggestion by the band, "Soror Irrumator" did not appear on the album's track listing. The album was released on February 26, 2016.

== Album title and lyrics ==
Explaining the album title, which is also the title of the album's fourth track, Ian said: "The meaning, to me, for this title is that everybody can be a king. Everybody can have control over their own lives, control over their destiny, just by growing up and becoming a responsible human being. I'm not necessarily saying that being a "king" is being the boss in your relationship, or any relationship for that matter. A king of yourself is what I mean. Taking responsibility and ownership for your own shit is basically what it means to me." Ian, who writes the band's lyrics, said he tried to incorporate different structural ideas for the lyrics to those featured on previous albums, crediting author David Mitchell as an influence.

Ian has said that "Breathing Lightning" is lyrically influenced by author Stephen King: "If I had to pick one thing that I love the most from him, it would be The Dark Tower books [...] The character Roland, it's just something that stays with me a lot, this character from those books. So I kind of re-entered that world again. 'Cause I wrote "Lone Justice" way back when, on the Spreading The Disease record, which was based on that character, and I decided to re-visit it, because, metaphorically, there's so many things you could use it for[...]I'm kind of weaving in and out of reality and fantasy in that song. And 'Breathing Lightning', of course, is a metaphor for shooting."

According to Benante, "Evil Twin" was inspired by events like the 2015 attack on the offices and staff of the French satirical publication Charlie Hebdo and various other mass shootings. Ian added that it was about by the actions of people "who feel they have become judge, jury and executioner over their fellow man", calling this mindset the "evil twin" of humanity.

Ian has described "Blood Eagle Wings" as the "centerpiece" of the album, and admitted having difficulty with writing the lyrics. Lyrically, the track concerns "Any great city, whether it's London, Rome, Paris, New York City, Los Angeles – these cities are alive because of how many people were killed to make them what they are. How much blood was spilled over time."

== Release and reception ==
=== Sales ===
For All Kings sold 34,000 copies in its first week of release in the United States, entering at number 9 on the Billboard 200 chart, marking the first time the band has had an album enter at the chart's top 10 since Sound of White Noise which was released in 1993 and debuted at number 7. The album's sales and chart performance also show an increase over the band's previous album, Worship Music which had first week sales of 28,000 and debuted at number 12. Eight weeks after its release, For All Kings sold over 57,000 copies in the US. The album has sold about 73,000 copies in the US as of November 2016.

=== Critical reception ===
Professional ratings
Aggregate scores
Source	Rating
Metacritic	70/100
Review scores
Source	Rating
AllMusic	3.5/5 stars
Classic Rock	7/10
Consequence of Sound	C
Exclaim!	7/10
The Guardian	4/5 stars
Kerrang!	4/5 stars
Metal Hammer	4.5/5 stars
PopMatters	7/10
Record Collector	3/5 stars
Sputnikmusic	3.8/5

According to the review aggregator Metacritic, For All Kings received "generally favorable reviews" based on a weighted average score of 70 out of 100 from 11 critic scores. Praise was given for its consistency and focus, as well as the contributions of newest member, lead guitarist Jon Donais, and many critics cited the 8-minute "Blood Eagle Wings" as a standout. Dom Lawson, writing for The Guardian gave the album a 4/5 star rating, describing it as being "full of the anthemic choruses and hulking riffs that have always driven their sound". He acknowledges that it is "in some ways a more focused effort" than 2011's Worship Music, though also compliments the band's mixing of thrash metal with more radio-friendly hard rock (such as on "Breathing Lightning") adding that "It's a blend that suits the band – and vocalist Joey Belladonna in particular – to a tee." J.C. Maçek III of PopMatters was also positive, giving the album a rating of 7/10 and stating that For All Kings "stands out as powerful thrash metal with a distinctive sound that is unmistakably Anthrax." He also points out how the album displays a darker side of the band than they displayed in the 80s, remarking that "It's hard to imagine this Anthrax donning colorful surfing shorts and performing more comedic songs like "I'm the Man" but also points out that as a consequence, the album "is somewhat lacking in "fun"". Chad Bowar of Loudwire, like Lawson, observes that the album "delivers the thrash that they are known for, but also sees them explore other sonic pathways without losing touch with their core sound", and also praises vocalist Joey Belladonna for sounding "even better and completely at ease" compared to Worship Music, in which he performed songs not originally written for him. He cites tracks such as "Evil Twin", "Suzerain" and "Monster at the End" as standouts.

However, others were more critical of the album. Jon Hadusek of Consequence of Sound cited the album, alongside other then-recent releases in the thrash metal genre such as Slayer's Repentless and Megadeth's Dystopia as being "a safe and agreeable slice of thrash, but it's also robotic, formulaic, and dated." He adds that "the songs on For All Kings feel like they were written in haste, by the old tried and true formula" and chided the band for "repeating themselves". He concludes that the album is "A victory lap for victory lap's sake. The definition of a fans-only release." Joel McIver of Record Collector writes that "truly warp-speed thrash beats are, disappointingly, largely absent" on the album.

== Track listing ==
All songs written by Joey Belladonna, Frank Bello, Charlie Benante and Scott Ian

Nuclear Blast version
No.	Title	Length
1.	"Impaled"	1:31
2.	"You Gotta Believe"	6:00
3.	"Monster at the End"	3:55
4.	"For All Kings"	5:00
5.	"Breathing Lightning"	5:37
6.	"Breathing Out"	0:55
7.	"Suzerain"	4:53
8.	"Evil Twin"	4:40
9.	"Blood Eagle Wings"	7:53
10.	"Defend/Avenge"	5:13
11.	"All of Them Thieves"	5:14
12.	"This Battle Chose Us!"	4:53
13.	"Zero Tolerance"	3:48
Total length:		59:34

Note: The Megaforce iTunes/download version of the album combines "Impaled" / "You Gotta Believe" and "Breathing Lightning" / "Breathing Out" as single tracks, with running times of 7:32 and 6:33 respectively. Although "Impaled" and "Breathing Out" are not indicated on the track listing on the packaging, the CD is mastered with these tracks separately as well.

Digital bonus tracks / Deluxe edition bonus disc - Recorded live at Loud Park Festival in Japan 10.10.2015
No.	Title	Length
1.	"Fight 'Em 'Til You Can't" (live)	6:10
2.	"A.I.R." (live)	6:37
3.	"Caught in a Mosh" (live)	5:18
4.	"Madhouse" (live)	4:05
Total length:		24:10

Japanese edition bonus track
No.	Title	Length
14.	"Vice of the People"	5:18
Total length:		64:52

The 2016 Limited Edition Box Set of the album includes a cover of "Carry On Wayward Son", which is close to the original of progressive rock band Kansas from 1976. Also the artwork of the cover is a deviation of the original Leftoverture cover. In 2017 the title was released as 12" maxi single with Black Math on the B side.

== Personnel ==
Credits are adapted from the album's liner notes.

Anthrax

- Joey Belladonna – lead vocals
- Scott Ian – guitar, backing vocals
- Jonathan Donais – guitar, backing vocals
- Frank Bello – bass, backing vocals
- Charlie Benante – drums, acoustic & electric guitar

Production

- Jay Ruston – production, mixing
- Paul Logus – mastering at PLX Mastering, NYC
- James Ingram – engineering
- Josh Newell – engineering
- Michael Peterson – engineering
- Asim Ali – additional engineering
- Andy Lagis – additional engineering
- Alex Elsammak – assistant engineering
- Ken Eisennagel – assistant engineering
- Molly Martin – assistant engineering
- Tony Perry – assistant engineering
- Michael Miller – drum technician
- Ian Galloway – guitar technician

Artwork and packaging

- Alex Ross – album artwork
- Charlie Benante – album design
- Douglas Hesser – graphic design
- Stephen Thompson – additional art

== Charts ==
=== Weekly charts ===
Chart (2016)	Peak position
Australian Albums (ARIA)	12
Austrian Albums (Ö3 Austria)	14
Belgian Albums (Ultratop Flanders)	36
Belgian Albums (Ultratop Wallonia)	16
Canadian Albums (Billboard)	14
Czech Albums (ČNS IFPI)	10
Dutch Albums (Album Top 100)	50
Finnish Albums (Suomen virallinen lista)	4
German Albums (Offizielle Top 100)	5
Hungarian Albums (MAHASZ)	17
Irish Albums (IRMA)	54
Italian Albums (FIMI)	46
Japanese Albums (Oricon)	39
New Zealand Albums (RMNZ)	33
Norwegian Albums (VG-lista)	25
Polish Albums (ZPAV)	35
Scottish Albums (Official Charts)	10
Spanish Albums (Promusicae)	46
Swedish Albums (Sverigetopplistan)	49
Swiss Albums (Schweizer Hitparade)	8
UK Albums (Official Charts)	21
UK Independent Albums (Official Charts)	4
UK Rock & Metal Albums (Official Charts)	1
US Billboard 200	9
US Independent Albums (Billboard)	1
US Top Hard Rock Albums (Billboard)	1
US Top Rock Albums (Billboard)	2
US Indie Store Album Sales (Billboard)	2

=== Year-end charts ===
Chart (2016)	Position
US Top Rock Albums (Billboard)	62
