= Dick Doyle (Wexford hurler) =

Irish hurler

Personal information
- Native name: Ristéard Ó Dúil (Irish)
- Born: 28 April 1878 Castlebridge, County Wexford, Ireland
- Died: 6 July 1946 (aged 68) Castlebridge, County Wexford, Ireland
- Occupation: Farmer
- Height: 5 ft 10 in (178 cm)

Sport
- Sport: Hurling
- Position: Full-forward
Club
- Years: Club
- Castlebridge
Club titles
- Wexford titles: 2
Inter-county
- Years: County
- 1910: Wexford
Inter-county titles
- Leinster titles: 1
- All-Irelands: 1

Richard Doyle (28 April 1878 – 6 July 1946) was an Irish hurler. His championship career with the Wexford team spanned the first decade of the 20th century.

Doyle was born in Castlebridge, County Wexford to the former Hannagh Lacy and Patrick Doyle. After a brief education he spent his working life as a farmer. Doyle first played competitive hurling with the Castlebridge club. Throughout his club career he won two county senior championship medals.

After impressing on the club scene, Doyle was chosen as captain of the Wexford team in 1909. He retained the captaincy the following year and was one of the most deadly forwards on the team. Doyle won his only All-Ireland medal in 1910 after scoring four goals in the final against Limerick. He had earlier won a Leinster medal.

Doyle died on 6 July 1946 aged 68.

== Honours ==
Castlebridge

- Wexford Senior Hurling Championship (2): 1904, 1910

Wexford

- All-Ireland Senior Hurling Championship (1): 1910 (c)
- Leinster Senior Hurling Championship (1): 1910 (c)

Sporting positions
Preceded by	Wexford Senior Hurling Captain; 1909-1910	Succeeded by
Achievements
Preceded by Dick Walsh	All-Ireland Senior Hurling Final winning captain 1910	Succeeded by Sim Walton
