= (Set This) World Ablaze =

Video by Killswitch Engage
- Released: November 22, 2005
- Recorded: July 25, 2005
- Venue: The Palladium in Worcester, Massachusetts
- Genre: Melodic metalcore
- Length: 67:56
- Label: Roadrunner
- Director: Lex Halaby

(Set This) World Ablaze is the first live album by the American metalcore band Killswitch Engage. The DVD is of a live show that was taped at The Palladium in Worcester, Massachusetts on July 25, 2005. It includes live tracks from Killswitch Engage, Alive or Just Breathing and The End of Heartache. Set This World Ablaze is the only Killswitch Engage media to have a Parental Advisory logo.

On August 4, 2006, (Set This) World Ablaze has been certified gold by the Recording Industry Association of America (RIAA).

== Track listing ==
No.	Title	Length
1.	"A Bid Farewell"	4:15
2.	"Breathe Life"	3:23
3.	"Fixation on the Darkness"	5:29
4.	"When Darkness Falls"	3:51
5.	"Self Revolution"	4:54
6.	"The End of Heartache"	4:49
7.	"Take This Oath"	3:40
8.	"Numbered Days"	4:51
9.	"The Element of One"	4:06
10.	"Prelude"	3:37
11.	"Hope Is..."	4:25
12.	"Life to Lifeless"	3:10
13.	"My Last Serenade"	3:51
14.	"Rose of Sharyn"	6:44
15.	"Vide Infra"	3:56
16.	"Temple from the Within"	7:24

=== Music videos ===
No.	Title	Length
1.	"Life to Lifeless"	3:29
2.	"My Last Serenade"	4:12
3.	"Fixation on the Darkness"	3:38
4.	"Rose of Sharyn"	3:52
5.	"The End of Heartache"	4:06

=== EP ===
No.	Title	Length
1.	"In the Unblind"	2:48
2.	"Numbered Days" (Demo)	3:37
3.	"The End of Heartache" (Live 7/25/2005)	4:46
4.	"Rose of Sharyn" (Live 7/25/2005)	3:56
5.	"Vide Infra" (Live 7/25/2005)	4:16

== Personnel ==
Killswitch Engage

- Adam Dutkiewicz – lead guitar, backing vocals
- Joel Stroetzel – rhythm guitar
- Mike D'Antonio – bass, artwork
- Howard Jones – lead vocals
- Justin Foley – drums

Production

- Lex Halaby – director, photography
- Drew Lavyne – mastering
- Adam Dutkiewicz – mixing
- Chris Fortin – engineer
- Wayne Krupa – engineer

== Charts ==
Chart (2005)	Peak position
Australia DVD (ARIA)	21
US DVD (Billboard)	21
UK Music Video (OCC)	48

== Certifications ==
Region	Certification	Certified units/sales
Canada (Music Canada)	Gold	5,000^{^}
United States (RIAA)	Gold	50,000^{^}
^{^} Shipments figures based on certification alone.

== Special features and trivia ==
- All of the band's music videos up to The End of Heartache (2004).
- "From The Bedroom To The Basement" – an 85-minute documentary on the rise of the band. Includes commentary from such people as Brian Fair from Shadows Fall, Randy Blythe from Lamb of God, Philip Labonte from All That Remains, Corey Taylor from Slipknot and Stone Sour, members of Unearth, In Flames, God Forbid, As I Lay Dying, Mastodon and many more.
- Also included is behind-the-scenes footage from the early days up through the history of the band's live shows until the summer 2005 tour.
- 5 rabbit holes pop up at different times during the From the Bedroom to the Basement documentary. When the subtitles are activated, the letters "KSE" pop up at the bottom right corner of the screen at certain points. Pressing enter will lead to comical interviews about the fictional group "Mr. Robotron".
