= Killswitch Engage (disambiguation) =

Killswitch Engage is an American metalcore band. It may also refer to two albums by that band:

- Killswitch Engage (2000 album), the debut self-titled album
- Killswitch Engage (2009 album), the self-titled fifth album
