= Adam Dutkiewicz =

American musician and record producer

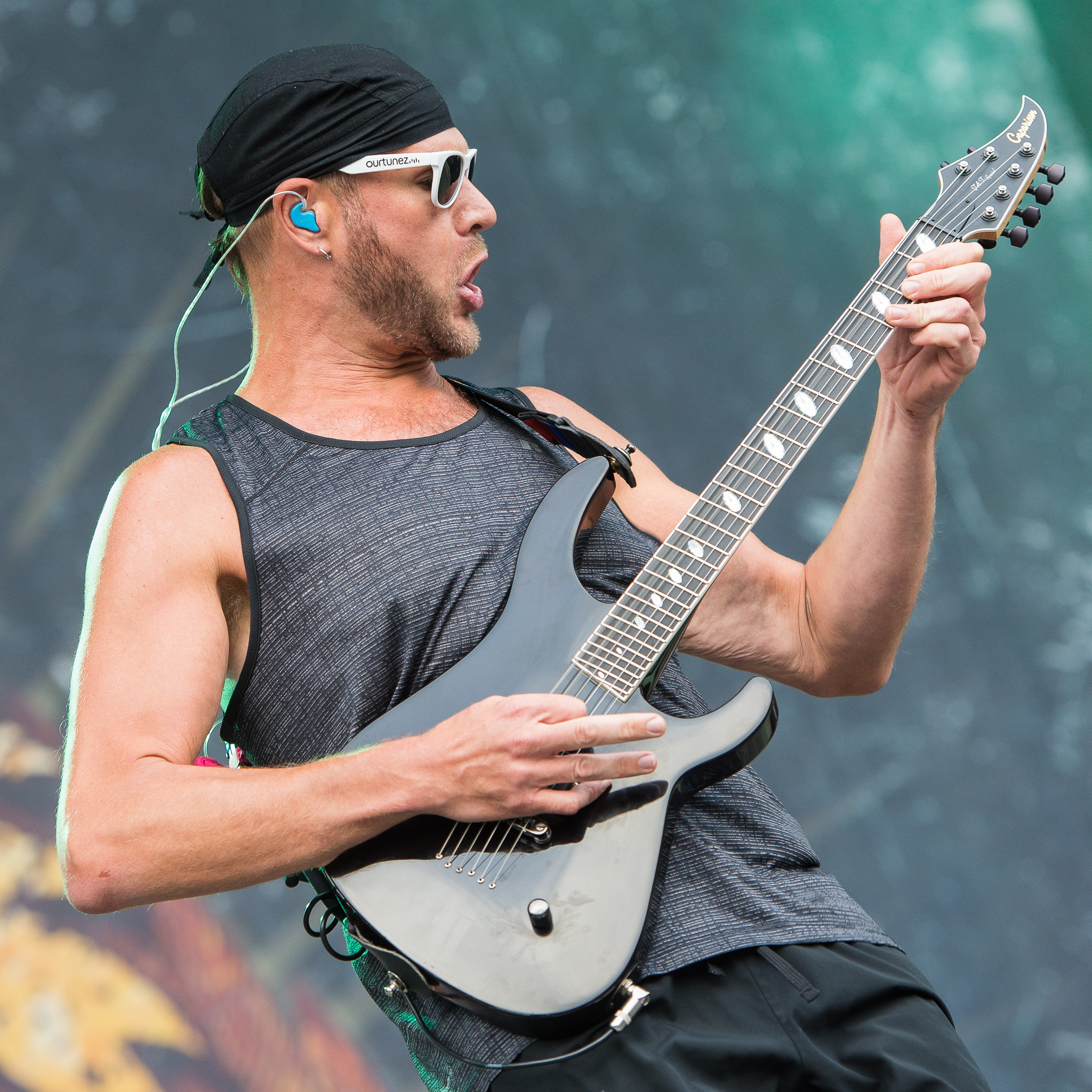
- Dutkiewicz with Killswitch Engage in 2016

Background information
- Also known as: Adam D; Trash D
- Born: Adam Jonathan Dutkiewicz; April 4, 1977 (age 49); Westhampton, Massachusetts, U.S.
- Genres: Metalcore; melodic death metal
- Occupations: Musician; record producer
- Instruments: Guitar; vocals; bass; drums
- Years active: 1992–present
- Member of: Killswitch Engage; Burn Eternal; Times of Grace; Serpentine Dominion
- Formerly of: Aftershock
- Website: killswitchengage.com

Adam Jonathan Dutkiewicz (born April 4, 1977) is an American musician and record producer. He is the lead guitarist of the metalcore bands Killswitch Engage, Aftershock and Times of Grace, as well as the guitarist and co-lead vocalist for the melodic death metal supergroup Serpentine Dominion. He has also produced and engineered albums for several other metal bands.

== Early life and education ==
Adam Jonathan Dutkiewicz was born on April 4, 1977 in Westhampton, Massachusetts, of Polish, Austrian, Scottish, and English descent.

Growing up, he taught himself Metallica riffs on bass and later learned how to play the drums and lastly the guitar.

He attended Hampshire Regional High School. Dutkiewicz also later attended the Berklee College of Music in Boston, studying production, audio engineering, and bass guitar. He graduated with a B.M. in 1999. While at college, he began playing guitar and producing for the band Aftershock with his brother Tobias Dutkiewicz and friend Joel Stroetzel. The group's debut album Letters was released in 1997, this was also the first ever recorded Dutkiewicz produced. The group released one more album in 1999 before shortly disbanding.

== Career ==
=== Killswitch Engage ===
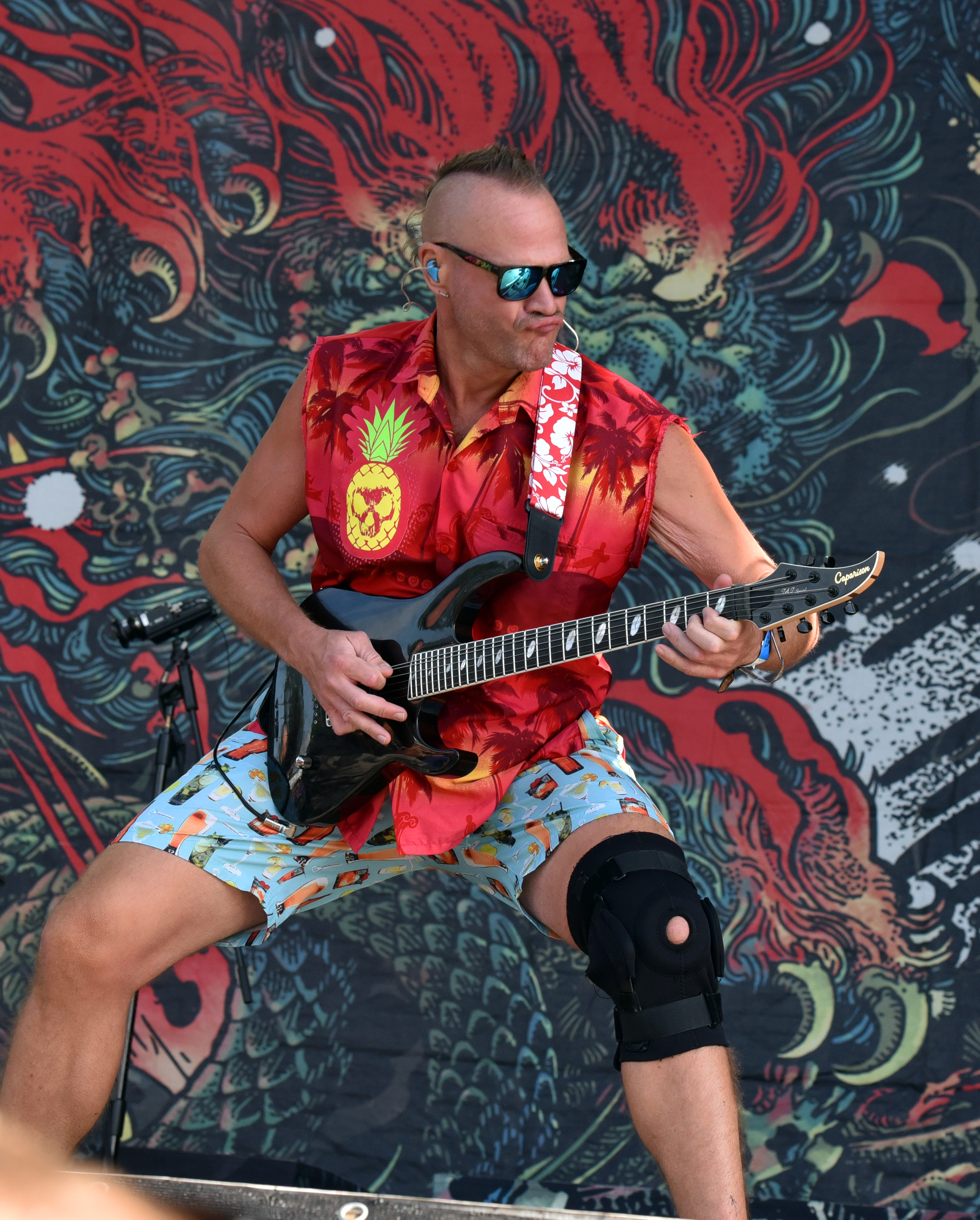
Dutkiewicz in 2023

Following the disbandment of Aftershock in 1999. Dutkiewicz began collaborating with former Overcast bassist Mike D'Antonio and vocalist Jesse Leach to form Killswitch Engage Dutkiewicz, now playing drums, also recruited guitarist Joel Stroetzel to complete the line up. Dutkiewicz was the drummer of Killswitch Engage, until the release of its second album, Alive or Just Breathing, when he moved to guitar, and Tom Gomes became the band's drummer.

In 2004 Dutkiewicz and the band would release their breakthrough album The End of Heartache. Dutkiewicz later commented on this time in a 2019 interview “The moment we were told that we were going to be featured in one of the Resident Evil movies, I realized that people were paying attention to us.” “It was a whole new world that opened up so many possibilities and potentials, so I think we did step it up. It was a good time for us.” During the recording of their certified platinum As Daylight Dies, Dutkiewicz pushed the band to relax their perfectionist habits that he instilled into theme during previous recordings. Part of loosening up was having more casual, relaxed recording sessions. Overall he has assumed the role of producer on all of Killswitch Engage's records, except on their second self-titled album Killswitch Engage, which was released June 30, 2009. For this album he took on the job of co-producer alongside Brendan O'Brien (known for his work with AC/DC, The Offspring, Pearl Jam, Rage Against the Machine, Incubus, Mastodon, and Stone Temple Pilots). He returned to full production work for their next album Disarm the Descent in 2013 and Incarnate (2016), which is the band’s highest charting album peaking at number 6 on the Billboard 200.

While Killswitch Engage was writing material for their next album Atonement lead singer Jesse Leach was suffering from both physical and mental issues. So Dutkiewicz took him aside and offered words of inspiration and help him finish laying down the tracks, Leach has described Dutkiewicz as his “musical soul mate”. Their most recent album This Consequence was released in 2025.

=== Times of Grace ===
While touring with KillSwitch Engage in 2007 Dutkiewicz had to undergo immediate back surgery. While in the hospital, he wrote new material which he later recorded and demoed at home. Dutkiewicz later contacted Jesse Leach about writing lyrics and recording vocals. This resulted in a side project called Times of Grace, they began recording material in 2008 with Dutkiewicz stating on the group's Myspace that the songs were "an epic mix of Metal/Rock/Pop/Shoe gaze & Punk. Their debut album The Hymn of a Broken Man was released in 2011. In 2021 the group released their second album Songs of Loss and Separation as a celebration of The Hymn of a Broken Man's tenth anniversary.

=== Production work ===
Dutkiewicz first got into engineering when he bought a four-track cassette recorder, he then continued working on his skills during his time at Berklee. Besides Killswitch Engage he has also produced for the bands As I Lay Dying, Underøath, The Devil Wears Prada, The Acacia Strain, Unearth, All That Remains, From Autumn to Ashes, Johnny Truant, Parkway Drive, The Agony Scene, Every Time I Die and others. He has been compared to Ross Robinson, producer of many nu metal albums, because of his influence on modern metal and shaping the sound of melodic metalcore. He is viewed as one of the more pivotal figures in helping shaping the genres sound, and has produced some of the more influential albums of the genre such as Alive or Just Breathing, The Fall of Ideals, and The On Coming Storm. He is also an engineer for Zing Recording Studios, which has produced for numerous artists, including several from Tooth & Nail Records and its heavy metal sub-label Solid State Records.

When it comes to helping artists reach their goals he stated “I listen,” “You hear what the personality of the band is. You listen for their strengths and traits. You want to embellish upon those. If somebody can do something that no one else can or has a specific talent, make sure the world hears it. And when you find something that takes away from the quality of the song––the groove, the ebb and the flow––always address that with the band.”

=== Other side projects ===
In 2002, Dutkiewicz, alongside Robby Roadsteamer, Ken Susi and his brother Tobias, formed The Sweatpant Boners. They released one album before breaking up that same year. In 2003 he would once again join Ken Susi along with Derek Kerswill to form Burn Your Wishes. This group also only made one album before disbanding.

In late 2003, Dutkiewicz became a touring member for Unearth playing the drums as they searched for a permanent replacement for their previous drummer.

In 2009, Dutkiewicz wrote songs for George Fisher and asked him to perform vocals over them. This eventually led to Dutkiewicz forming Serpentine Dominion consisting of Fisher and Shannon Lucas. They released their debut self titled later that same year.

In December 2024, it was announced Dutkiewicz and his former Killswitch Engage bandmate Howard Jones were almost finished mixing a debut album for their new band called Burn Eternal. The band's debut single, Wounds I've Made, was released digitally on 5 November 2026.

== Equipment ==
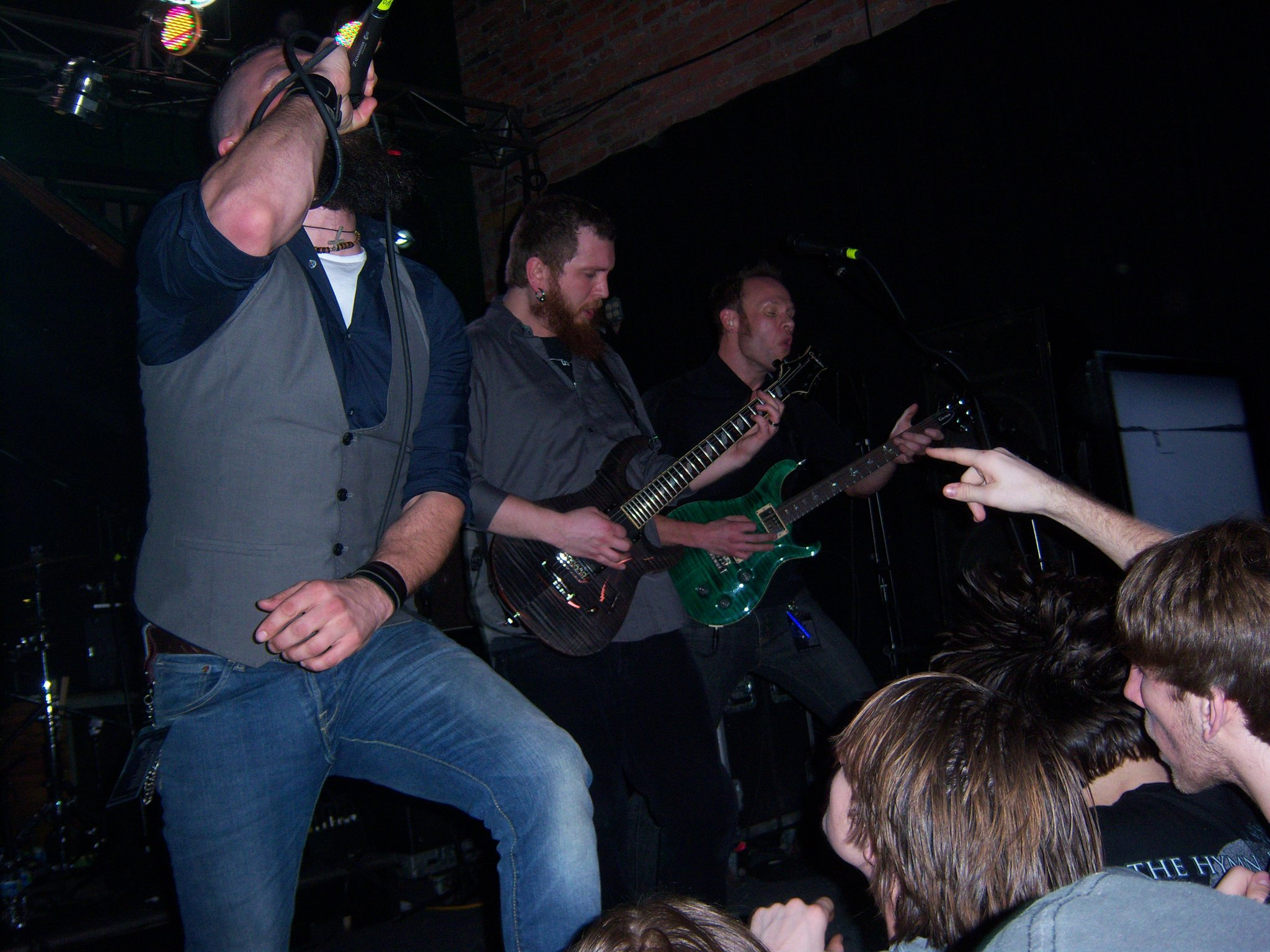
Adam Dutkiewicz (far right) performing in Times of Grace.

=== Guitars ===
Dutkiewicz has been a longtime player of Caparison Guitars mostly using the Caparison PLM-3, a discontinued model, with EMG pickups (EMG 85 in the bridge, and two EMG SA single coils in the middle and neck positions) and DR Tite-Fit .012-.052 strings. He also uses the Caparison Dellinger, Horus, TAT, and Angelus models. He is quoted as saying that he likes the guitars because they have a very "strat-like neck." Ever since 2007, he has been seen using various models and brands, but still uses Caparison for tracking in the studio.

In 2008 shows, Dutkiewicz used a black Parker Fly with an EMG 81/EMG 85 set for pickups. Atop this, he used a custom Caparison, modeled after the Dellinger model. He previously used Parker Guitars for their light weight so as to avoid worsening his back problems, but ended his endorsement due to quality issues after getting his signature model. Sometime in 2008, he switched to using a stock PRS Guitars Custom 22, which he used for a few years. In the video for "In Due Time", Dutkiewicz can be seen using an EVH Wolfgang Hardtail. He has since then switched to EVH Wolfgangs full-time. The modifications done to the Wolfgangs involve removing the neck pickup, pickup selector switch, and tone knob, replacing the Schaller fine-tuning stop-tail piece with a standard stop-tail piece, replacing the locking nut with a standard nut, and installing locking tuners.

In 2015, Dutkiewicz officially re-joined Caparison Guitars. He now also uses Fishman Fluence Modern pickups. He uses his signature model, the Caparison Metal Machine. It is based on the TAT Special FX with Fishman Fluence Killswitch Engage Signature pickup in the bridge position. He left out the neck pickup for more wood mass in the guitar.

=== Amplification and effects ===
Dutkiewicz has used a wide variety of amps throughout his career, including the Mesa/Boogie Roadster and Triple Rectifier heads, a Marshall JCM900, a modified Soldano SLO-100, and a Hughes and Kettner TriAmp MKII, which he did not like for metal because he said it "didn't hold together well." He has also used the Framus Cobra and Dragon, the Peavey 5150, the Splawn Nitro, the Diezel VH4, and the Fuchs Viper for distorted tones, and the Fender Twin '65 Reverb and Vox AC30 for clean tones. He is currently endorsed by Laney Amplification, used their Ironheart series of amplifiers and currently using Tony Iommi’s signature amplifier TI-100.

In his current live amp rig, he uses both Laney amps, making use of a Laney Iommi head with a Celestion Vintage 30-loaded Laney Iommi 4x12 cabinet for his distorted tones, and a Laney Lionheart 1x12 combo for clean tones.

For his current live effects rig, he makes use of a Maxon OD808 Overdrive, Maxon AD-9 delay, Maxon CP-9 Pro+ compressor, Boss Corporation NS-2 Noise Suppressor, Boss ABY switcher, Jet City JetDirect DI box, and a Korg DTR2000 tuner. For wireless, he uses an Audio-Technica 5000 Series.

Dutkiewicz currently uses D'Addario EXL115 (.011 - .049) string sets with Intune 1.14mm picks.

== Musical style and influences ==
Dutkiewicz's style is a fusion of the melodic rock and extreme metal styles. He also does not rehearse often and “just wings it”. He stated in a 2011 interview "I'm not technique-driven at all. I never really aspired to be anything fantastic as a player, it's about making music first and foremost.”

Growing up Dutkiewicz listened to a lot of classic rock acts such as AC/DC and Led Zeppelin. He has cited Eddie and Alex Van Halen as an influence on his guitar playing and drumming. Additionally, he has credited James Hetfield for making him the guitarist he is today.

== Stage presence ==
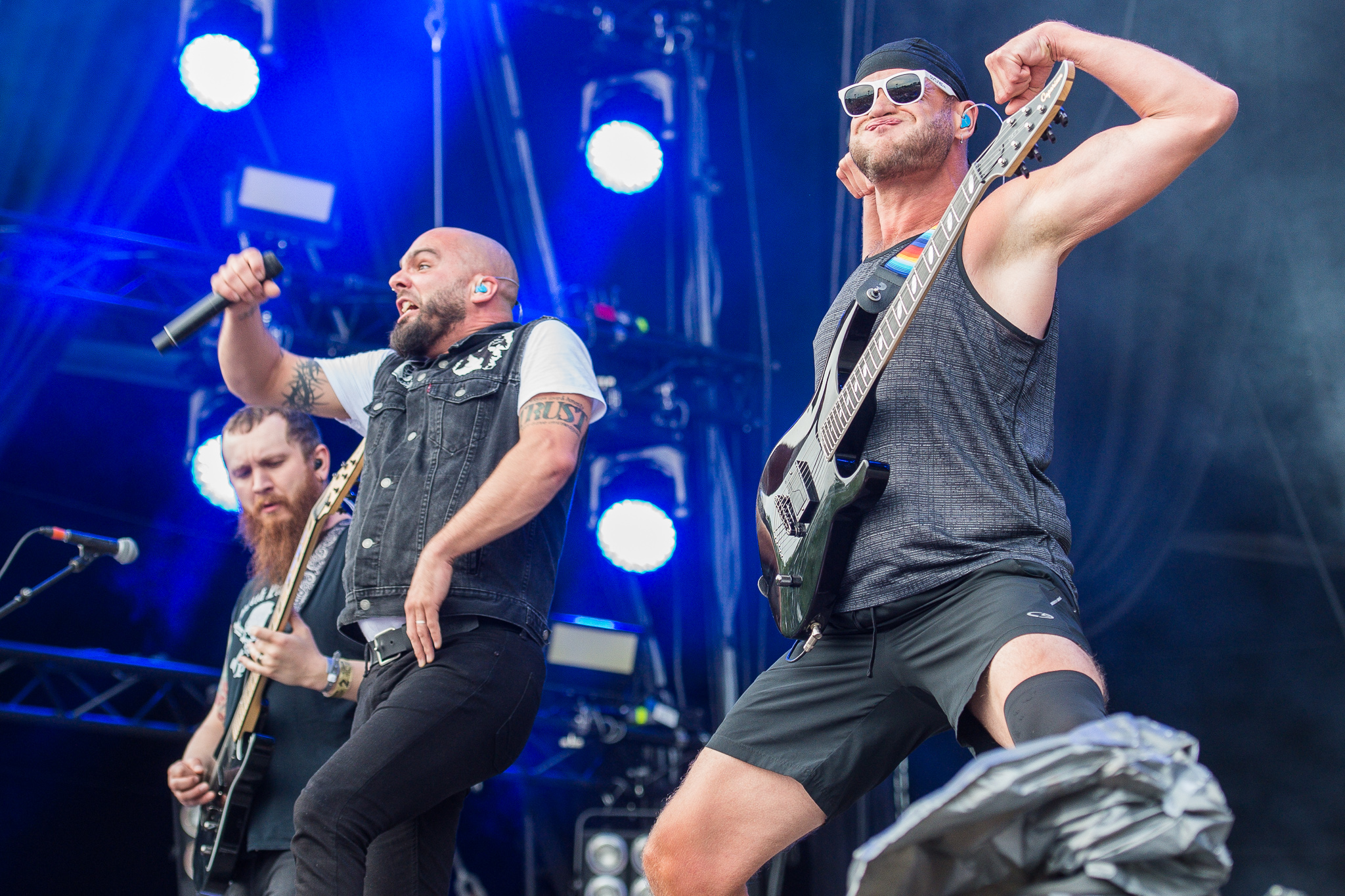
Adam Dutkiewicz (far right) performing in Killswitch Engage. Dutkiewicz is well known for his unique stage attire.

Dutkiewicz's is known for his energy and humor during live shows, sprinting across the stage and providing other over the top movements. He is said to provide a combination of “comedic showmanship and musical mastery.” He is also known to occasionally wear comedic costumes on stage.

Regarding Dutkiewicz's stage personality, Joel Stroetzel stated, "Adam likes to take the piss out of things. Just wants to have a good time—kind of act like an asshole, but in a funny way. He likes to get people going, egg the crowd on. He gets up there and calls the crowd ‘pussies’ and all this stuff. But coming from a guy wearing short shorts and a cape, you gotta take things like that in stride."

Talking about Dutkiewicz's stage attire, Jesse Leach stated, "That's his sort of middle finger to everybody, to all the people who act very tough and think metal has to be doom and gloom and trying to be a cool or tough guy, that's his punk rock way."

Due to Dutkiewicz and his bandmates efforts they took home the award for best live band at the 2014 Metal Hammer Golden God awards.

== Personal life ==
Dutkiewicz resides in San Diego, California, he is an outdoor enthusiasts and stated he fell in love with the city's beaches and hiking trails while producing a record in the area. In his spare time he enjoys cooking and playing video games. Dutkiewicz used to be straight edge.

On February 10, 2015, Dutkiewicz was a contestant on the CBS game show The Price Is Right, where he won $51,832 in prizes, including a 2015 Honda Fit, a 2015 Nissan Frontier, a small trailer, and a trip to Borrego Springs.

== Awards and nominations ==
Under Dutkiewicz production work Killswitch Engage album The End of Heartache won best won best album at the 2004 Metal Hammer Golden Gods Awards. The title track also gained the band their first Grammy nomination for best metal performance at the 47th Annual Grammy Awards. Since then the group have garnered two more Grammy Nominations in the same category for “In Due Time” (2014) and “Unleashed” (2020) Killswitch Engage has also won 3 Boston Music Awards and their 2006 album As Day Light Dies was nominated for album of the year in 2007. In 2009 their second self titled record won best international album at that years Bandit Rock Awards. Their albums Disarm the Descent and Incarnate were both nominated for metal album of the year at the Loudwire Music Awards. In 2012 Alive or Just Breathing was inducted into the Decibel Hall of Fame.

He also produced the As I Lay Dying album An Ocean Between Us; the lead single "Nothing Left" was nominated for Best Metal Performance at the 50th Annual Grammy Awards.

== Discography ==
=== Aftershock ===
- Letters (1997) – drums
- Through the Looking Glass (2000) – lead guitar, vocals

=== Sweatpant Boners ===
- Cruisin' With the Masters (2002) – drums

=== Burn Your Wishes ===
- Split EP w/ The Awards (2003)- guitar

=== Killswitch Engage ===
- Killswitch Engage (2000) – drums, backing vocals, production
- Alive or Just Breathing (2002) – drums, piano, guitar, backing vocals, production
- The End of Heartache (2004) – lead guitar, additional percussion, backing vocals, production
- As Daylight Dies (2006) – lead guitar, vocals, co-production
- Killswitch Engage (2009) – guitar, backing vocals, co-production
- Disarm the Descent (2013) – guitar, vocals, production
- Incarnate (2016) – guitar, backing vocals, production
- Atonement (2019) – guitar, vocals, production
- This Consequence (2025) – guitar, backing vocals, production

=== Times of Grace ===
- The Hymn of a Broken Man (2011) – vocals, guitars, drums, bass, production
- Songs of Loss and Separation (2021) – vocals, guitars, bass, production

=== Serpentine Dominion ===
- Serpentine Dominion (2016) – guitars, bass, backing vocals, production

=== Other appearances ===
- Total Brutal by Austrian Death Machine (2008) – production, guitar solo in track "Come with Me If You Want to Live"
- "A Song for Chi" by Various (2009) – guitars

== Production discography ==
Year	Artist(s)	Album	Role
1997	Aftershock	Letters	Producer, engineer, recording, mixing, lead guitar, vocals
1997	Shadows Fall	To Ashes (EP)	Co-producer
1997	Shadows Fall	Somber Eyes to the Sky	Producer, mixing
1998	Aftershock, Dive	Aftershock / Dive (Split)	Recording, drums, bass, lead guitar, backing vocals, writer
1999	6thirty7	Seed.	Producer, mixing
1999	Aftershock	Through the Looking Glass	Engineer, recording, lead guitar, backing vocals, synth programming
1999	Aftershock, State Craft	Constructive Deconstruction / Forever Yours (Split)	Producer, engineer, recording, mixing, drums, lead guitar, backing vocals
1999	Liz Lysinger	Falling Off My Bench...	Mixing (tracks 3, 4 and 9)
1999	Maudlin of the Well	My Fruit Psychobells...A Seed Combustible	Mixing
1999	Grimlock	Crusades of Reality (EP)	Recording, mixing
1999	Killswitch Engage	Demo	Producer, recording
2000	Burial	Enlightened with Pain	Engineer
2000	Flatlined	One Step Closer to Eternal Rest (EP)	Producer
2000	In Pieces	Brick Wall Stare (7")	Engineer, mastering
2000	Rain Fell Within	Believe (EP)	Mixing
2000	Killswitch Engage	Killswitch Engage	Producer, engineer, recording, guitar (track 9), drums, percussion, backing vocals, writer (track 9)
2000	Aftershock	Five Steps from Forever (EP)	Recording, mixing, guitar, backing vocals
2001	Melodram	Melodram (EP)	Producer
2001	Unearth	The Stings of Conscience	Producer, recording, mixing
2001	Aftershock	Propaganda (Compilation)	Producer, engineer, recording, mixing (disc 1: tracks 1–8, 11–14, disc 2: tracks 1–14), guitar, backing vocals, programming
2001	Acephalus	Fetal Display (EP)	Recording
2001	Every Time I Die	Last Night in Town	Producer, engineer, recording, mixing
2001	From Autumn to Ashes	Too Bad You're Beautiful	Producer, engineer, additional vocals (track 8), additional guitar, double bass (stand up bass) (track 10)
2001	Arma Angelus	Where Sleeplessness Is Rest from Nightmares	Producer, engineer, recording
2002	Cannae	Demo 2002	Engineer
2002	Split Shift	Split Shift	Engineer
2002	Trauma Concept	The End of Denial	Producer, recording, mixing and mastering
2002	Proclamation	Let the Truth Be Told (Compilation)	Remixing (tracks 1-24)
2002	Acephalus	Forgotten Shadows	Engineer, mixing
2002	All That Remains	Behind Silence and Solitude	Producer
2002	Killswitch Engage	Alive or Just Breathing	Producer, engineer, recording, additional guitar, drums, percussion, piano, double bass (stand up bass), backing vocals, writer
2002	Norma Jean	Bless the Martyr and Kiss the Child	Producer
2002	The Acacia Strain	...And Life Is Very Long	Recording
2002	Unearth	Endless (EP)	Producer, engineer, recording (tracks 1–3), mixing
2003	Burn Your Wishes, The Awards	Burn Your Wishes & The Awards (Split)	Recording (tracks 1–4)
2003	With Honor	With Honor (EP)	Recording, mixing and mastering
2003	The Agony Scene	The Agony Scene	Producer, engineer
2003	Cannae	Horror	Producer, engineer, recording, mastering
2004	All That Remains	This Darkened Heart	Producer, engineer, recording, mixing, writer
2004	Killswitch Engage	The End of Heartache	Producer, engineer, recording, mixing (tracks 16–18), lead guitar, additional percussion, backing vocals, writer
2004	Unearth	The Oncoming Storm	Producer, engineer, recording, mixing
2004	The Acacia Strain	3750	Producer, engineer
2004	Salem, Johnny Truant	The Bloodening / Brighton By The Sea (Split 7")	Producer, mixing and mastering
2004	He Is Legend	I Am Hollywood	Producer, mixing
2005	Killswitch Engage	Killswitch Engage (2005 Reissue)	Producer, remixing, remastering, guitar (track 9), drums, backing vocals, writer (track 9)
2005	Parkway Drive	Killing with a Smile	Producer, engineer, recording, mixing
2005	Johnny Truant	In the Library of Horrific Events	Producer, vocal producer, vocal recording (track 2), mixing and mastering
2005	August Burns Red	Thrill Seeker	Producer, engineer, recording, mixing
2005	Unearth	Our Days of Eulogy	Producer, recording, mixing
2005	Killswitch Engage	(Set This) World Ablaze	Producer, mixing, lead guitar, backing vocals, writer
2006	Once Beloved	Once Beloved (EP)	Producer
2006	The Acacia Strain	The Dead Walk	Producer, recording, mixing
2006	Underoath	Define the Great Line	Producer, guitar (track 11)
2006	All That Remains	The Fall of Ideals	Producer, engineer, recording, mixing
2006	Killswitch Engage	As Daylight Dies	Producer, engineer, recording, mixing, lead guitar, backing vocals, writer
2007	Caliban	The Awakening	Mixing
2007	As I Lay Dying	An Ocean Between Us	Producer, recording
2007	Parkway Drive	Horizons	Producer, engineer, recording, mixing
2008	MyChildren MyBride	Unbreakable	Mixing
2008	Austrian Death Machine	Total Brutal	Producer, guitar solo (track 6)
2008	Overcast	Reborn to Kill Again	Producer, engineer, mixing
2008	Underoath	Lost in the Sound of Separation	Producer
2008	Unearth	The March	Producer, engineer, recording
2009	A Day to Remember	Homesick	Mixing
2009	Killswitch Engage	Killswitch Engage	Co-producer, engineer, recording (guitar and bass), mixing, lead guitar, writer
2009	Caliban	Say Hello to Tragedy	Mixing
2009	Various	"A Song for Chi"	Guitar, writer
2010	Various	God of War: Blood & Metal (EP)	Co-producer, mixing, guitar, backing vocals, writer (track 1)
2010	As I Lay Dying	The Powerless Rise	Producer, engineer, recording
2010	A Day to Remember	Attack of the Killer B-Sides (EP)	Mixing
2010	All That Remains	...For We Are Many	Producer, engineer, recording, mixing
2011	Times of Grace	The Hymn of a Broken Man	Producer, engineer, recording, mixing, guitar, bass, drums, keyboards, vocals, lyrics, writer
2011	Unearth	Darkness in the Light	Producer, engineer
2011	The Devil Wears Prada	Dead Throne	Producer, engineer, recording, mixing
2011	As I Lay Dying	Decas	Producer, engineer, recording (track 1)
2012	Shadows Fall	Fire from the Sky	Producer, engineer, recording
2012	All That Remains	A War You Cannot Win	Producer, engineer, recording
2013	Killswitch Engage	Disarm the Descent	Producer, engineer, recording, lead guitar, backing vocals, lyrics, writer
2013	The Devil Wears Prada	8:18	Producer
2016	Killswitch Engage	Incarnate	Producer, engineer, recording, mixing, lead guitar, backing vocals, writer
2016	Serpentine Dominion	Serpentine Dominion	Producer, engineer, mixing, guitar, bass, vocals, lyrics, writer
2018	Unearth	Extinction(s)	Engineer (drums), recording
2019	Killswitch Engage	Atonement	Producer, engineer, recording, lead guitar, backing vocals, writer
2019	As I Lay Dying	Shaped by Fire	Co-producer (additional), engineer (drums), recording
2020	Killswitch Engage	Atonement II: B-Sides for Charity (EP)	Producer, engineer, lead guitar, backing vocals, writer
2021	Two Minutes to Late Night	Covers Vol. 8 (EP)	Guitar, writer (track 3)
2021	Times of Grace	Songs of Loss and Separation	Producer, engineer, mixing, guitar, bass, backing vocals, lyrics, writer
2023	Creeping Death	Boundless Domain	Producer, recording, mixing
2023	A Day to Remember	For Those Who Have Heart	Remixing
2025	Killswitch Engage	This Consequence	Producer, engineer, lead guitar, backing vocals, writer
