= Jesse Leach =

American singer (born 1978)

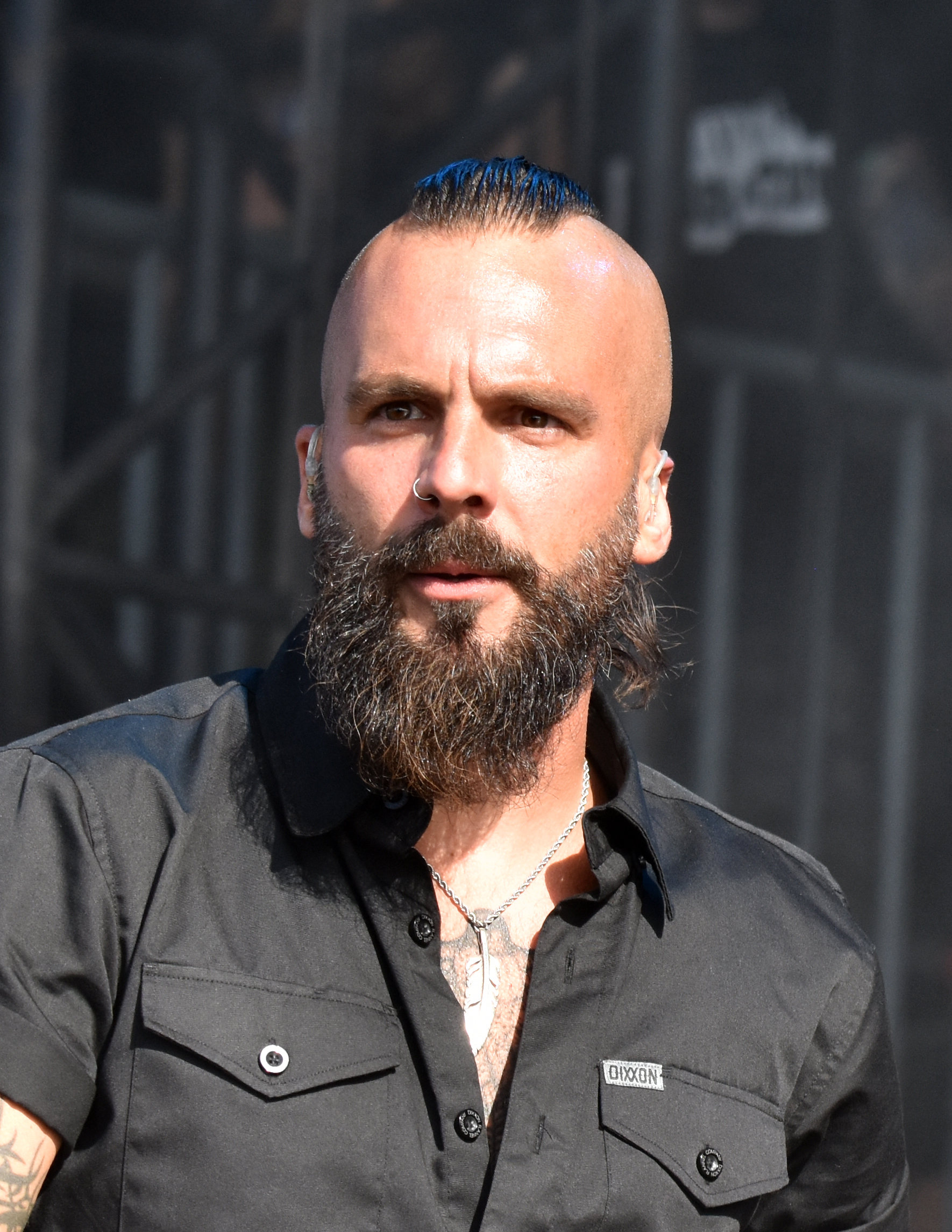
- Leach with Killswitch Engage in 2023

Background information
- Born: Jesse David Leach; July 3, 1978 (age 48)
- Genres: Metalcore; heavy metal; stoner metal; hard rock; hardcore punk; ambient
- Occupation: Singer
- Years active: 1993–present
- Member of: Killswitch Engage; Times of Grace; The Empire Shall Fall; The Weapon; The Way Back Within
- Formerly of: Seemless; Corrin; Nothing Stays Gold

Jesse David Leach (born July 3, 1978) is an American musician, best known as the lead vocalist of the metalcore band Killswitch Engage. He is also a vocalist for Times of Grace and The Weapon. Leach co-founded Killswitch Engage in 1999, but left the band in 2002; in February 2012, he rejoined the group following the departure of vocalist Howard Jones. He currently resides in the Catskill Mountains in New York.

== Biography ==
=== Early career ===
Leach was born in Winter Haven, Florida. His early life was shaped by his parents, who moved the family frequently for his father's spiritual work as a preacher. After spending time in Philadelphia, they eventually settled down in Providence Rhode Island. While Leach was initially interested in rap and urban music during his time in Philadelphia, it was in Providence that he was first exposed to more underground music scenes. He began going to small-club shows regularly, the first real live show he saw was a band called Kilgore when he was 14. He has claimed, "That exposure changed his life."

Leach's first band, Corrin, was formed in the early 1990s. Corrin recorded four songs in 1996 which were eventually released as a CD by Propaganda Machine in 1998 after the band's breakup.

Leach's second band, Nothing Stays Gold, formed in the mid-'90s. They put out a single EP before splitting in 97/98.

Leach played a small role in the 1999 film "Outside Providence", directed by his uncle Michael Corrente. The film is an adaptation of Peter Farrelly's 1988 novel of the same name. Leach played a boy named Decenz.

=== Killswitch Engage ===
Some remaining members of Overcast and Aftershock were forming a new band in the Massachusetts area and were seeking a vocalist. In 1999, Leach along with bassist Mike D'Antonio, guitarist Joel Stroetzel, and drummer Adam Dutkiewicz formed Killswitch Engage. Their self-titled debut was released on July 11, 2000.

Killswitch Engage's next effort, Alive or Just Breathing, was released on May 21, 2002, and is viewed as a genre defining, landmark album for the genre, putting Killswitch Engage at the forefront of the metalcore scene. Leach has stated the lyrics were intended to bring a positive message through the music. Two weeks prior to going on tour, however, Leach married his fiancée. When he was not contacting his wife, Leach would sit alone in the tour van for hours after shows and simply wait for the remaining band members to return. Leach's passion for his music combined with his emotional struggles at the time made him unable to exercise control over his screaming. He would blow his voice out after a few shows and struggle with the rest of the tour. Leach also began suffering from mild depression, which grew worse as the tour continued. According to Mike D'Antonio in an interview for Killswitch's "(Set This) World Ablaze" DVD, "It seemed like there was always this dark cloud over Jesse's head." His depression led him to resign from the band and drop out of the public eye for some time. Leach wrote an email to the band explaining why he left. Quoting Leach from his interview in the DVD, "I didn't have the mental energy to face them, or even call them on the phone rather. I was at a point in my life where I just didn't want to face any of them so I wrote them a long email explaining, like, I'm just done. Explaining what every song meant to me, explaining what the whole experience was to me, and I said 'Bye. Ya know? You're not going to be able to find me, I'm going on my honeymoon finally. And, uh, don't try and call me don't try and contact me, I'm done. Done with music, period.'" While away from the band, he worked as a bartender in Manhattan.

Leach reconciled with his former bandmates in 2004, appearing as a guest vocalist on "Take This Oath". In 2005 at the Roadrunner United 25th anniversary concert, he performed a duet with then singer Howard Jones. The entire band played on stage (minus Dutkiewicz who had been out with an injury and was replaced by Andreas Kisser of Sepultura) with both Jones and Leach singing "My Last Serenade". The song ended with the two embracing and Leach thanking the crowd for their support through his difficult times.

During Killswitch Engage's winter tour in 2010, it was announced Howard Jones would not be performing. On March 18, 2010, Leach returned to the band for a series of songs. From then on, Leach performed as a substitute vocalist for the remainder of the tour.

Following Howard Jones' departure from the band in 2012, Killswitch Engage started looking for a replacement. Leach made the decision to re-audition for the role, and on February 6, 2012, Killswitch Engage uploaded a photo of Leach and the rest of the band to the website, indicating Leach's return to the band. Killswitch Engage later released a statement via Facebook, confirming Leach's permanent return to the band. Leach has given much credit to Jones for his work with the band while he had been gone.

Killswitch Engage's sixth studio album, Disarm the Descent, was released on April 2, 2013. It was announced in December 2013 that "In Due Time" was nominated for "Best Metal Performance" at the 2014 Grammy Awards, becoming the band's first Grammy nomination with Leach. At the time of the album's release Leach stated "To me, this is by far my best vocal performance, much thanks to Adam's guidance and faith in my abilities. I am very grateful to be where I am in life, back in an amazing band with a record we are all excited for the world to hear."

The writing process for the band's next album proved to be lengthy and troublesome, as Leach "hit a wall with ideas" after completing three or four tracks on the album, with Leach not finding lyrics that he "was really stoked on". Leach later stated that it "came to a point where this album literally drove me crazy", in that "there were a good couple of weeks where I wasn't myself. I just got lost in the process, because I wanted this record to be everything it could be. I was losing sleep, not sleeping at all, and waking up in the middle of the night and sitting down and writing pages and pages and pages of words. By the time all was said and done, I probably had 80 pages of lyrics. I just wanted to give it everything I could, vocally and lyrically." On March 11, 2016, Killswitch Engage released their seventh album, Incarnate, which is the band's highest performing album to date and peaked at number 6 on the U.S. billboard 200, along with topping both U.S Top Rock Albums Billboard the Hard Rock Albums Billboard.

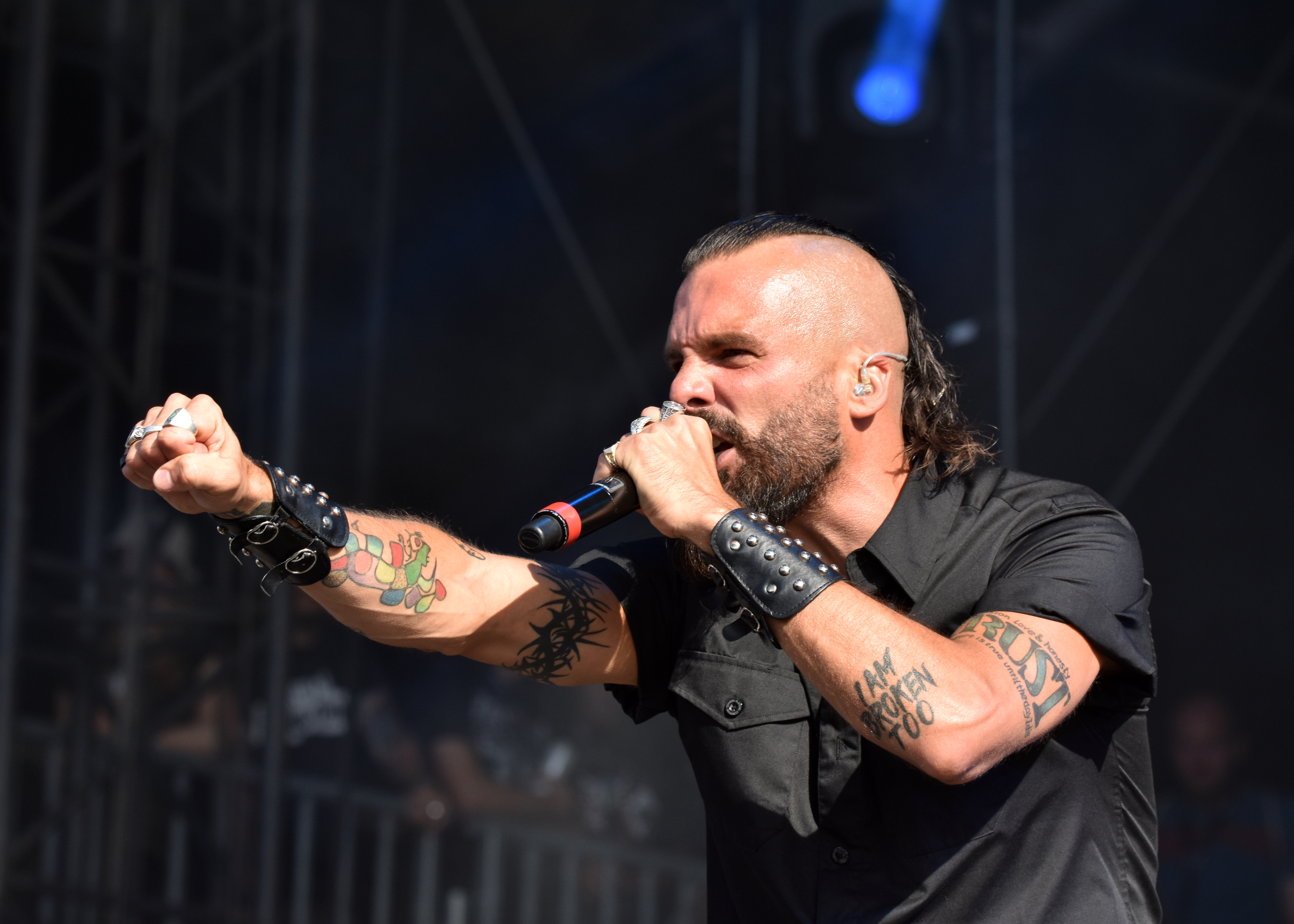
Leach performing with Killswitch Engage at Wacken Open Air 2023

In 2018, Leach dealt with some physical and mental issues. He underwent successful surgery on his vocal cords to remove a polyp in April 2018 while also dealing with depression, anxiety, and "full-on mental breakdowns". Although these setbacks had an impact on the recording schedule for the 8th album, he eventually finished laying down the tracks along with help from guitarist and producer Adam Dutkiewicz, who Leach has described as his "musical soulmate." Atonement, their eighth album, was released on August 16, 2019, featuring a duet with former vocalist Howard Jones titled "The Signal Fire". The song was created to help raise awareness for mental health; Leach and Jones have since become good friends.

This Consequence, their 9th album, was released on February 21, 2025. Leach originally struggled to come up with material for the album, stating "I went through — I don't know — seven, eight songs where I was kind of just throwing it out to see what would stick," "And those guys were, like, 'This doesn't feel like you're really giving us your best.' So having that sort of rejection from them initially was very hard. It sort of felt like I was becoming insecure. I was wondering if I had it in me. But that turned into a determination to rediscover myself as a writer, to go deeper, to tap into things that I never tapped in before."

=== Seemless ===
In 2003, Jesse joined a blues rock band called Seemless. Seemless toured the US many times with bands like Fu-Manchu, The Sword, Trivium, and In Flames. Touring with Seemless proved that Jesse was back and able to complete tours. Seemless released two albums and had multiple videos featured on MTV's Headbangers Ball. In 2006, their video for the single "Cast No Shadow" made MTV's Top Ten new videos. Due to drummer Derek Kerswill's involvement with Unearth, among other projects, Seemless broke up after a final show on September 12, 2009

=== The Empire Shall Fall ===
In 2008, Jesse Leach formed the band The Empire Shall Fall with friends in his area. The band released their first independent album Awaken on November 17, 2009. The Empire Shall Fall consists of Leach, guitarists Jake Davenport and Marcus de Lisle, bassist Nick Sollecito, and drummer Jeff Pitts.

=== Times of Grace ===
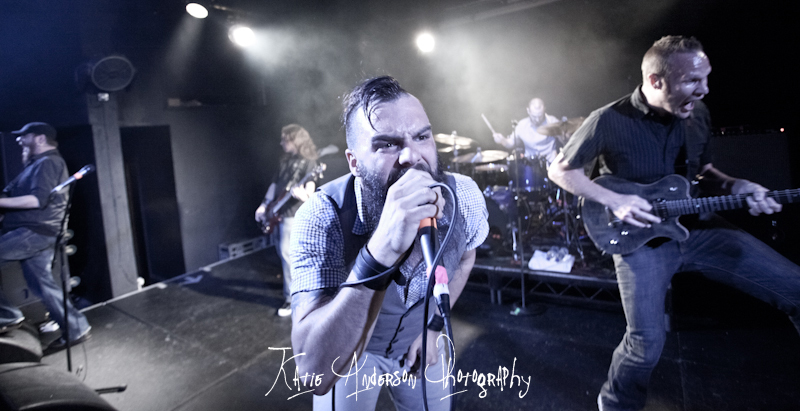
Jesse Leach performing with Times of Grace

Leach worked on another album with Killswitch Engage bandmate Adam Dutkiewicz. Leach has stated that the working title for the project with Dutkiewicz is Times of Grace. Their debut album was released on January 18, 2011, and has Dutkiewicz on lead vocals on several tracks. The album's first single, "Strength in Numbers", was released on October 15 via Roadrunner Records as a free digital download for 72 hours for those who signed up for the band's mailing list. The album was made with the support of Killswitch Engage.

On January 18, 2021, the band announced their comeback to celebrate The Hymn of a Broken Man's tenth anniversary. Their second album, Songs of Loss and Separation, was released on July 16, 2021.

=== Other projects ===
George Fisher stated on "The Jasta Show" that Jesse Leach wrote the lyrics for Fisher's new side project called Serpentine Dominion, also consisting of Adam Dutkiewicz from Killswitch Engage and Shannon Lucas. He explained, "I originally was going to write stuff for the new band, and you know what? Writing lyrics has just never been my thing, and we were getting down to when I was supposed to go up there and lay down my vocals. And Adam just said, 'Look, I'll ask Jesse to write some stuff.' So he wrote it, and I just said I don't want no pro-religious crap 'cause I ain't about all that. Anyway, so it's more just about like getting revenge against corrupt motherfuckers and shit like that. And so Jesse wrote a bunch of lyrics and Adam arranged a lot of it, and then when I went up there, we recorded it in his bedroom of his house. And, basically, I would be, like, 'No, wait. We've gotta change this, fix that.' Maybe we'd tweak a word or take a word out or take a couple words out or take some lines out. We just basically fucked with it, you know? And I went up two or three different times to work on the vocals."

In May 2017, Leach stated on his official Instagram account that he had begun writing songs for his new hardcore punk project titled The Weapon. On May 20, 2020, The Weapon released their debut album, A Repugnant Turn of Events.

Since 2020, Leach has also been sporadically releasing ambient music under the moniker The Way Back Within.

== Style and influences ==
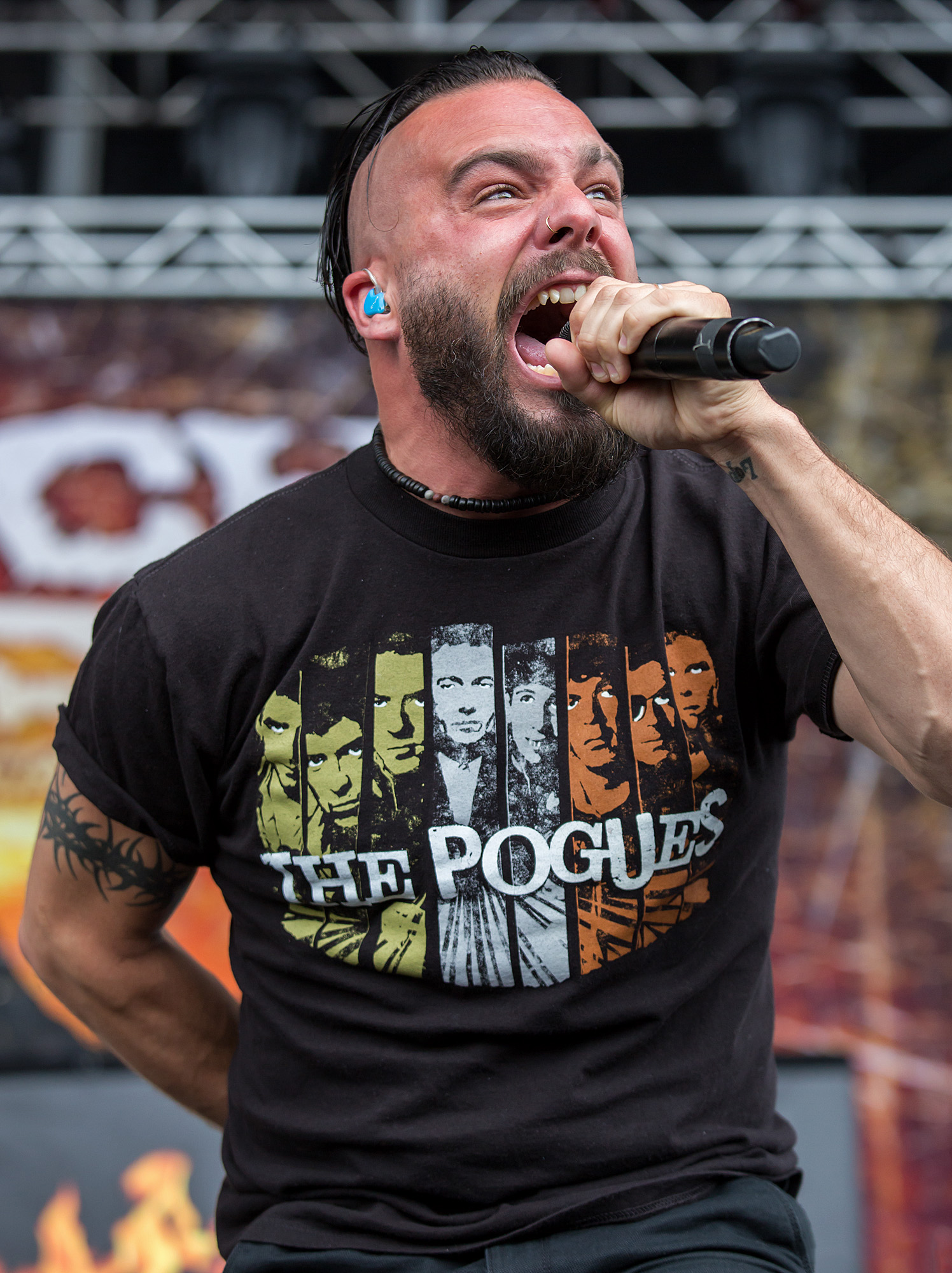
Leach with Killswitch Engage in 2014

Some of Leach's lyrics touch upon love, connection, mental health and social issues. He has claimed that he tries to evolve with every new album. He stated in an interview with Blabbermouth.net that he writes lyrics while "sitting in my darkness, understanding my darkness and then finding a solution to it. It's kind of the formula I like to use 'cause I always like to inject some positivity." Adding "If my music can resonate in any way to create some sort of a positive ripple, that is why I do it. Think for yourself." Leach’s father was a minister, and some of his lyrics have been influenced by his Christian upbringing. In a 2025 interview, he stated, "Even though I don’t subscribe to organized religion anymore, I like using biblical words here and there to sort of tie in the themes. With Killswitch Engage Leach vocally combines singing, screaming vocals, and growls.

He stated in an interview with Loudwire that he first learned how to scream around the age of 15 after stepping on a nail while practicing in his parent’s garage, and sound that came out of him as it happened was the exact sound he was looking to make. Throughout most of his career Leach never had proper vocal training only talking a handful of one off classes. However this changed in 2018, following surgery on his vocal cords to remove a polyp. After the surgery Leach began his recovery and also started taking better care of his vocals, working with trainer Melissa Cross, while also incorporating daily vocal warm ups.

Some of his biggest vocal inspirations are Faith No More singer Mike Patton and Dan Swanö. He has also mentioned being into genres outside metalcore/hardcore: reggae, old-school hip hop, '90s alternative, and "gothy" sounds like the Cocteau Twins and The Sundays.

== Personal life ==
Leach has been married twice; first to his ex-wife Mellisa. The couple were together for 16 years before separating in 2018. In 2024 Leach married again, this time to his longtime girlfriend Corinne. The two currently reside in Catskill Mountains. Leach enjoys cooking and spending time in nature.

Leach is also a strong proponent of mental health awareness. In 2013, Jesse participated in the "Music Saved My Life" video with Hope For The Day, where he spoke candidly about his struggles with depression and how music played a role in his recovery. Once again in 2019, he teamed up with HeartSupport, another mental health organization. In an interview, he discussed that knowing "you're not alone" saved his life along with encouraging others to seek help. He also used to host a podcast titled "stoke the fire" which also focused on mental health.

Although Leach was raised as an evangelical Christian he has since stepped away from organized religion and views himself as a spiritual being. In a 2026 interview he stated "I've humbled myself because I think there's a bit of arrogance in telling somebody you know the absolute truth. The more I've traveled, the more my worldview has changed. It's an acceptance that I don't have the answers, but I'm going to continue to search until the day I die."

In 2018, Leach co-hosted the 2nd Annual "Small Bites of Hope" alongside chef Brian Tsao and Jamey Jasta in order to raise funds for Hope For The Day.

In September 2025, Leach announced the launch of his first-ever signature necklace in with collaboration with Black Feather Design.

== Achievements ==
During Leach's second tenure with Killswitch Engage, the band was nominated for two Grammys for Best Metal performance. The first came in 2014 for their song "In Due Time", then in 2020 for the song "Unleashed".

In 2013, Leach and the band were nominated for Metal Album of the Year, Metal Song of the Year and Metal Band of the Year at the Loudwire music awards. Also being nominated for Metal Song of the Year and Metal Band of the Year at the 2016 iteration of the event.

In 2014, at the Metal Hammer Golden Gods Awards, the band won the award for Best Live Act.

In 2023 Leach was ranked the 38th greatest frontman / frontwoman of the 21st century by Loudwire.

=== Awards and nominations ===
Year	Award	Category	Result
2012	Loudwire Music Awards	Rock Titan of the Year	Nominated
2016	Loudwire Music Awards	Best Vocalist of the Year	Nominated
2016	Revolver Music Awards	Best Vocalist	Nominated

== Discography ==
=== Corrin ===
- Despair Rides On Angel Wings [EP] (1995)
- Corrin/Arise Split (1996)
- Plutonian Shores (1998)

=== Nothing Stays Gold ===
- Nothing Stays Gold (EP) (1998)

=== Killswitch Engage ===
- Killswitch Engage (2000)
- Alive or Just Breathing (2002)
- The End of Heartache (2004) - Guest vocals on "Take This Oath" and "Irreversal".
- Disarm the Descent (2013)
- Incarnate (2016)
- Atonement (2019)
- Live at the Palladium (2022)
- This Consequence (2025)

=== Seemless ===
- Seemless (2005)
- What Have We Become (2006)

=== The Empire Shall Fall ===
- Awaken (2009)
- Solar Plexus (2011)

=== Times of Grace ===
- The Hymn of a Broken Man (2011)
- Songs of Loss and Separation (2021)

=== The Weapon ===
- A Repugnant Turn of Events (2020)

== Guest appearances ==
- Killswitch Engage – "Take This Oath"
- Killswitch Engage – "Irreversal" (The End of Heartache Special Edition)
- Killswitch Engage – "Loyalty" (Game of Thrones: Catch the Throne; the Mixtape Volume II)
- Roadrunner United – "Blood And Flames" (Leach, Heafy, Rand, D'Antonio, Kelly) (Roadrunner Records 25th Anniversary)
- Thy Will Be Done – "Preserving The Sacred"
- Atresia – "Life from Life" (Heavy Metal Mixtape)
- Serpentine Dominion – Lyrics for the album
- Machine Head – "Stop The Bleeding" (Civil Unrest)
- Left to Vanish – "Healthy"
- Wolfheart – "Ancestor"
- August Burns Red – "Ancestry"
- Anti-Flag - "MODERN META MEDICINE"
- Employed to Serve - "Whose Side Are You On"
- Terminal Nation - "Merchants of Bloodshed"
