= The Empire Shall Fall =

American metal band

- Origin: Providence, Rhode Island, U.S.
- Genres: Metalcore, heavy metal
- Years active: 2008–present
- Label: Angle Side Side Records
- Members: Jake Davenport; Marcus de Lisle; Jeff Pitts; Alan Feeney; Dylan Nash
- Past members: Jesse Leach; Nick Sollecito

The Empire Shall Fall is an American metalcore band formed by Jesse Leach with friends in 2008. The band released their first independent album Awaken which was released on November 17, 2009, until Jesse and Nick left The Empire Shall Fall in 2019. Nick Sollecito also left The Empire Shall Fall to focus on his other band, The Dear Hunter. The Empire Shall Fall currently consists of singer Alan Feeney, guitarists Jake Davenport and Marcus de Lisle, bassist Dylan Nash, and drummer Jeff Pitts.

== History ==
=== Inception (2008–2009) ===
The Empire Shall Fall was formed in late 2008 by current Killswitch Engage frontman Jesse Leach with a handful of instrumentalists: guitarists Jake Davenport and Marcus de Lisle, bassist Nick Sollecito, and drummer Jeff Pitts. The Empire Shall Fall is the first band vocalist Leach has used predominantly screamed vocals in since Killswitch Engage, although the band retains some of the singing elements of Seemless, which has since been put upon an indefinite hiatus.

In 2008 the band released a demo consisting of four songs on their Myspace page: "Voices Forming Weapons", "The Kingdom", "These Colors Bleed", and "We The People". The demo is currently available for download on their record label Angle Side Side Records' official website. The label has since stated that "The Empire Shall Fall enters HQ Sound Labs Studio (Dear Hunter, Receiving End of Sirens) in April to begin recording for their debut CD to be released Summer '09."

On September 11, 2009, The Empire Shall Fall announced through their Myspace page that their debut album Awaken would be released on November 17, 2009, with eight songs, including the previously recorded demo tracks re-recorded and reworked, and three new songs which had only been played live.

=== Awaken (2009–2011) ===
Awaken was released on November 17, 2009, through Angle Side Side Records, owned by The Empire Shall Fall's bassist, Nick Sollecito. The band cites its influences as At the Gates, Meshuggah, and Edge of Sanity. Awaken draws heavily on the band members' interests in jazz, punk, and experimental music. They are said to sound like Refused, At the Drive-In, Deftones, and Between the Buried and Me. The album reflects heavily on the themes of politics and transcendentalism. Lyrically the album advocates positivity, unity, and empowerment. Inspirations for the album have been cited as Jello Biafra, Benjamin Franklin, and Ron Paul.

=== Volume 1: Solar Plexus (2011–present) ===
The band announced their intention to release a new EP via their social networks (i.e. Facebook, Twitter, Hootsuite etc.) in early 2011. In a recent tumblr post, the band revealed: "we have been working on a series of concept EPs. While we haven't yet released details on the concept linking the EPs, we can tell you that the first one deals with redemption and the "guts of emotion." Lyrical content deals with "picking up the pieces of your life and starting over" and "finding a new perspective as a result of the changes and lessons learned in the past." The first EP, called "Volume 1: Solar Plexus" was released digitally December 6, 2011. In February 2014, the band posted on their tumblr page revealing that they have spent the past year working on the upcoming album Volume 2: Heart. As of November 2020, no such release has materialized.

== Members ==
- Jake Davenport – lead guitar (2008–present)
- Marcus de Lisle – rhythm guitar (2008–present)
- Jeff Pitts – drums, percussion (2008–present)
- Alan Feeney – lead vocals (2019–present)
- Dylan Nash – bass (2020–present)

== Former members ==
- Jesse Leach – lead vocals (2008–2019)
- Nick Sollecito – bass (2008–2020)

=== Discography ===
Year	Album details	Chart peaks			Certifications (sales thresholds)
Year	Album details	US	UK	AUS	Certifications (sales thresholds)
2009	Awaken Released: November 17, 2009 Label: Angle Side Side Records	—	—	—	—
2011	Volume 1: Solar Plexus Released: December 6, 2011 Label: Angle Side Side Records	—	—	—	—
