= Serpentine Dominion =

American death metal band

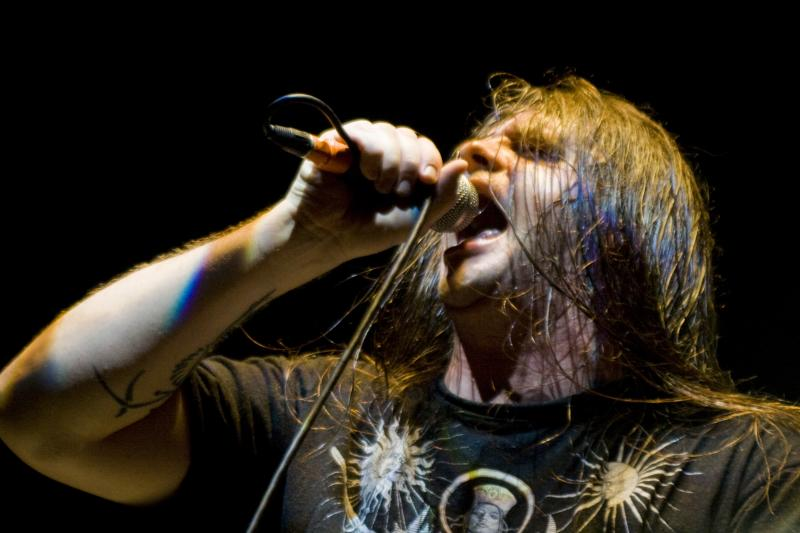
- Vocalist George "Corpsegrinder" Fisher, also of Cannibal Corpse

Background information
- Genre: Death metal
- Years active: 2011–present
- Label: Metal Blade
- Spinoff of: Killswitch Engage; Cannibal Corpse; The Black Dahlia Murder
- Members: Adam Dutkiewicz; George Fisher; Shannon Lucas

Serpentine Dominion is an American death metal supergroup consisting of Killswitch Engage lead guitarist Adam Dutkiewicz, Cannibal Corpse vocalist George "Corpsegrinder" Fisher and former The Black Dahlia Murder drummer Shannon Lucas. They released their debut album on October 28, 2016.

== History ==
The origins of Serpentine Dominion can be traced back to 2009's Rockstar Energy Drink Mayhem Festival, which Killswitch Engage, Cannibal Corpse and The Black Dahlia Murder were all part of. In a 2013 interview with Decibel, Dutkiewicz said that one night during the tour he had asked Fisher whether he would sing over songs Dutkiewicz wrote for him, and Fisher agreed. Dutkiewicz said the songs were written specifically for Fisher. Shannon Lucas was tapped to record the drums for the album.

On July 22, 2016, the band announced that their name would be "Serpentine Dominion". On August 11, 2016, they revealed the release date and track listing for their self-titled debut, to be released under Metal Blade Records. Serpentine Dominion was officially released on October 28, 2016, and was met with positive reviews from both fans and critics.

In May of 2026 Dutkiewicz revealed that he had begun writing material for the band’s second studio album.

== Musical style ==
Serpentine Dominion's sound has been described as death metal, and extreme metal. Speaking to Decibel in 2013, Dutkiewicz said: "It's not straight death metal — there's some melodic elements in there — but it's much faster and more aggressive than Killswitch is. And the drums are blazing, so Shannon is probably one of the only guys on the face of the earth who could pull this off."

The band's lyrics for their debut album were written by Killswitch Engage vocalist Jesse Leach. Fisher stated in "The Jasta Show": "I originally was going to write stuff, and you know what? Writing lyrics has just never been my thing, and we were getting down to when I was supposed to go up there and lay down my vocals. And Adam just said 'Look, I'll ask Jesse to write some stuff.' So he wrote it, and I just said I don't want no pro-religious crap 'cause I ain't about all that. Anyway, so it's more just about like getting revenge against corrupt motherfuckers and shit like that."

== Reception ==
Serpentine Dominion received positive reviews. Metal Injection rated the album 9/10 and called it one of the most "fun, straightforward and downright badass" metal albums of 2016. The review praised its balance between brutality and melody, but had reservations about the length of the album. Richard Holmes of Rushonrock rated it 8/10, praising Dutkiewicz's riff writing and the album's concise songs, but suggested that his clean vocals might not suit extreme metal purists. All About the Rock gave it a rating of 8.5/10 and praised Lucas's drumming and the contrast between Dutkiewicz's clean vocals and Fisher's growls. This review also pointed out the length of the album as a drawback. The Moshville Times gave it 8/10 but noted that the album played it somewhat safe and was missing experimentation.

== Members ==
- Adam Dutkiewicz – guitar, bass, vocals
- George Fisher – vocals
- Shannon Lucas – drums

== Discography ==
- Serpentine Dominion (2016, Metal Blade Records)
