= The End of Heartache (song) =

- Cover art for the Resident Evil: Apocalypse promo single

Single by Killswitch Engage

from the album The End of Heartache and Resident Evil: Apocalypse Soundtrack
- Released: August 2004
- Recorded: December 15, 2003 – January 29, 2004
- Studio: Zing Studios, Westfield, Massachusetts
- Genre: Metalcore
- Length: 4:58 (album version); 4:04 (Resident Evil: Apocalypse version)
- Label: Roadrunner
- Songwriters: Mike D'Antonio, Adam Dutkiewicz, Justin Foley, Howard Jones, Joel Stroetzel
- Producer: Adam Dutkiewicz

Killswitch Engage singles chronology
| "Rose of Sharyn" (2004) | "The End of Heartache" (2004) | "A Bid Farewell" (2005) |

"The End of Heartache" is a song by American metalcore band Killswitch Engage. It is the title track and second single from the band's third studio album, The End of Heartache.

The song became the band's breakthrough single, peaking at no. 31 on the Mainstream Rock Chart.

== Composition and background ==
Stephen Hill described the song as "a slow-building epic that eschewed the Killswitch sound of savage metallic hardcore for an altogether more anthemic vibe", noting the hook as introducing new dynamics to the band. Guitarist Adam Dutkiewicz attributed the song to a desire to do something the band had never done before which would resonate with a large number of people.

On the writing process Dutkiewicz stated:

The song came together really easily. To be honest, I didn’t have to change the way that I wrote to incorporate Howard, or think about finding a sound that was more commercial; I just wrote something I thought sounded cool and he came in and made it soar. It just felt huge.

The lyrics touch upon feelings, lost love and digging into your heartache.

== Music video ==
Two videos were produced for the song. The video edit of the song features mostly clean singing from vocalist Howard Jones with a few background screams, much like the video for "My Curse".

The first video shows the band performing the song inter-cut with footage from Resident Evil: Apocalypse along with close-up shots of the band playing.

The second video cuts out the Resident Evil: Apocalypse footage and cuts between shots of the band performing the song.

== Reception ==
The song was included on Revolver's list of "16 Great Non-Hair-Metal Power Ballads".

In 2012 Loudwire dubbed "The End of Heartache" the 8th best metal song of the 21st century. Crediting the songs "rattling riffs and memorable lyrics." Adding "From the moment Howard Jones sings 'Seek me / Call me / I’ll be waiting' the track’s infectious vibe begins to take hold." The also named the song to their list of the 66 best metal songs of the 21st century in 2020.

Metal Hammer dubbed the song an "epic anthem that kicked metalcore to the next level." In their description they called it "a slow-building epic that eschewed the Killswitch sound of savage metallic hardcore for an altogether more anthemic vibe, Howard’s Jones gargantuan vocal hook giving a whole new set of dynamics to the band."

In a 2018 poll held by Revolver Magazine it was voted Killswitch Engage’s fifth best song the publication added "Between Howard Jones’ powerhouse croons, Adam Dutkiewicz’s djenty licks and Justin Foley’s relentless snare abuse, its instant-classic status — and place on this list — comes as no surprise."

=== Awards ===
The song was nominated for Best Metal Performance at the 47th Annual Grammy Awards, but lost to "Whiplash" by Motörhead.

== In popular culture ==
On April 21, 2005, Killswitch Engage performed the song on Jimmy Kimmel Live, marking their first appearance on the show.

The song also appeared as the theme song for the 2004 zombie action film Resident Evil: Apocalypse. More recently the professional wrestler Roderick Strong, has used End of Heartache as his theme song on numerous occasions, most recently in All Elite Wrestling. Strong's finishing maneuver is also called the End of Heartache in reference to the song.

== Track listing ==
Resident Evil: Apocalypse promo single

| No. | Title | Length |
|---|---|---|
| 1. | "The End of Heartache" | 4:04 |

US/UK promo single

| No. | Title | Length |
|---|---|---|
| 1. | "The End of Heartache" (Album version) | 4:58 |
| 2. | "The End of Heartache" (Resident Evil: Apocalypse version) | 4:04 |

== Personnel ==
Killswitch Engage

- Howard Jones – lead vocals
- Adam Dutkiewicz – lead guitar, backing vocals
- Joel Stroetzel – rhythm guitar
- Mike D'Antonio – bass guitar
- Justin Foley – drums

Additional musicians

- Andy Sneap – additional guitar

== Charts ==
| Chart (2004) | Peak position |
|---|---|
| US Mainstream Rock Airplay (Billboard) | 31 |

== Certifications ==
| Region | Certification | Certified units/sales |
|---|---|---|
| United States (RIAA) | Gold | 500,000^{‡} |
^{‡} Sales+streaming figures based on certification alone.
