= Awaken (The Empire Shall Fall album) =

Studio album by The Empire Shall Fall
- Released: November 17, 2009
- Recorded: Providence, Rhode Island, United States
- Genre: Metalcore
- Length: 39:34
- Label: Angle Side Side
- Producer: Marcus de Lisle

The Empire Shall Fall chronology
The Empire Shall Fall Demo (2008)	Awaken (2009)

Singles from Awaken
- 1. "Lords of War" Released: 2010

Professional ratings
Review scores
Source	Rating
Sputnikmusic	3/5 stars

Awaken is the debut studio album by The Empire Shall Fall, released on November 17, 2009 through Angle Side Side Records, owned by The Empire Shall Fall's bassist, Nick Sollecito. Awaken features the vocal talents of Killswitch Engage vocalist Jesse Leach. The band cites its influences as At the Gates, Meshuggah, and Edge of Sanity. Awaken draws heavily upon the band members' interests in jazz, punk, and experimental music. The album reflects heavily on the themes of politics and transcendentalism. Lyrically the album advocates positivity, unity, and empowerment. Historical inspirations for the album have been cited as Jello Biafra, Benjamin Franklin, Cynthia McKinney, and Ron Paul.

== Track listing ==
1. "Awaken" – 5:03
2. "Lords of War" – 3:37
3. "Voices Forming Weapons" – 4:08
4. "Choir of Angels" – 6:01
5. "We The People" – 5:50
6. "These Colors Bleed" – 4:35
7. "Our Own" – 5:24
8. "The Kingdom" – 4:55

== Personnel ==
- Jesse Leach - vocals
- Jake Davenport - lead guitar
- Marcus de Lisle - guitar
- Nick Sollecito - bass guitar
- Jeff Pitts - drums, percussion

=== Technical personnel ===
- Producer - Marcus de Lisle
- Sound Engineer - Sean Small
- Graphic Designer - Matthew Yezuita
- Photographer - Emily Stamp
- P&R - Kim Kelly/Catharsis PR
