= Killswitch Engage (2009 album) =

Studio album by Killswitch Engage
- Released: June 30, 2009
- Recorded: October 2008 – March 2009
- Genre: Melodic metalcore
- Length: 38:09
- Label: Roadrunner
- Producers: Brendan O'Brien, Adam Dutkiewicz

Killswitch Engage chronology
| As Daylight Dies (2006) | Killswitch Engage (2009) | Disarm the Descent (2013) |

Alternative cover
- Special edition cover

Singles from Killswitch Engage
- 1. "Reckoning" Released: June 1, 2009; 2. "Starting Over" Released: June 6, 2009; 3. "Take Me Away" Released: October 27, 2009; 4. "Save Me" Released: May 25, 2010

Killswitch Engage (often called Killswitch Engage II or KSE II) is the fifth studio album by the American metalcore band Killswitch Engage. It was released on June 30, 2009 through Roadrunner Records. It is the band's second album to be self-titled, the first being their debut album. It was produced by Adam Dutkiewicz and Brendan O'Brien. The album's reception from critics and fans has been mixed, with praise for Howard Jones's vocals and criticism of Dutkiewicz's and O'Brien's production and the album's reliance on formula.

The album debuted and peaked at number 7 on the Billboard 200, selling 58,000 copies in its first week, making it one of the band's highest charting album at that time.

It was supported by three singles, "Reckoning", "Starting Over", and "Save Me", as well as two music videos. This is the band's last studio album to feature Howard Jones on lead vocals.

== Background and recording ==
The album was officially announced in late 2008. Recording began in October 2008 with Dutkiewicz and co-producer Brendan O'Brien. The decision to bring in another producer was made in order to shake up things up as Dutkiewicz had been their sole producer on their four previous albums. When the band first met Brendan he told them that he hated metal music, however he still wanted to work with the band because he liked their previous work.

In February 2009, bassist Mike D'Antonio confirmed in an interview with Metal Hammer that "drums were finished", and that he had "finished up the last few bass fixes". He also stated that Howard [Jones] is in Atlanta finishing vocals, and that "it shouldn't be too much longer now." The album's name was announced on April 14, and was revealed to be their second self-titled album since their debut album of the same name.

Dutkiewicz later reflected on the album in an interview stating "it was pretty much us wanting to branch out a bit more. We’ve done lots of records with lots of screaming, so we thought we’d do one with more singing. I think Howard just wanted to showcase it a little more to be honest with you. He’s naturally a really good singer, so heck – why not do it more? It literally was wanting to take the record in a different direction, to break the mould and see if we could be creative in a different way, to write different things just for the sake of trying it and go into a slightly different direction."

The album marked the first time Killswitch Engage recorded an album without Adam Dutkiewicz as the sole producer. This led to the band having a rough time recording the album frontman Howard Jones told Rolling Stone "This album will be the death of me, there was nothing comfortable about it for any of us". Most of the album was recorded in Atlanta, Georgia, making it their first album not recorded in their home state of Massachusetts.

Before the album's release, "A Light in a Darkened World" was added to the band's setlist in the first half of 2009. The band also performed it at the 2009 Golden Gods Awards. On May 28, 2009, the band's official fanclub, Take This Oath, were granted access to listen to the track "Reckoning". It was released as a promotional single the following day, and was available as a free download on Roadrunner Records' official website.

On June 19, the entire album was available for preview at various Hot Topic locations. It was posted on the band's official Myspace on June 25.

== Writing ==
Dutkiewicz noted that the band tried to be more experimental with the album and wanting to remove themselves from their "creative comfort zone." In an interview with Metal Hammer he commented:

I guess we tried to be more conscious about writing songs that were more concise, got to the point a little quicker and were a little more ...I guess you could say fun to listen to. I think before all we were worried about was just putting in riffs and riffs and this time we put a little more emphasis on writing songs that keep the listener’s attention. It still sounds very much like a Killswitch record, there’s just a little bit more singing on this record, and the songs feel a little easier to listen to.

The albums change is musical style also extended to the lyric where the band aimed for a greater sense of vulnerability, with an attempt to move away from bands perception of a upbeat metal band. In an with Blabbermouth.net interview Howard Jones talked about the albums lyrical themes stating:

We're known for being a pretty positive band — we're almost a self-help band, I feel like Tony Robbins or something. We're known for anthems, but this time I really tried to write from a different place. I've got enough to draw on to write some stuff that can be dark. Maybe there's still a hint of positivity in it, but there are some songs on there that are not positive at all.

== Release and promotion ==
The album was released on June 30, 2009 through Roadrunner Records. It debuted at number 7 on the Billboard 200, selling more than 58,000 copies in its first week, making it the band's highest charting album to date. It also became the bands first album to top the US Hard Rock Albums chart. A special edition was released on the same day.

If the album was pre-ordered on the band's official website, the buyer would be entered into a drawing to win a custom Parker P44 guitar with artwork from the album as the paint job.

The album's first official single, "Starting Over", was available for digital download on June 6, 2009. It charted at number 30 on the Billboard Rock Songs Chart. A music video for the track was shot in early 2009 and directed by Lex Halaby. The video was premiered on VH1 on June 5, and on MTV the following the day. On May 24, 2010, a trailer of the music video for the album's third single, "Save Me", was released on the band's website. The video premiered on Craveonline the following day. The entire video was created using claymation, and depicts the band members saving lead vocalist Howard Jones from aliens.

Throughout July and August 2009, the band participated in the Mayhem Festival with headlining bands Marilyn Manson, Slayer, Bullet For My Valentine and more in promotion of the album. In September 2009, the band commenced a Canadian co-headlining trek with In Flames. In November 2009, the group teamed up once again with In Flames for the European leg of the "Taste of Chaos" tour. In February 2010, the band announced that vocalist Howard Jones would not be performing with Killswitch Engage during their winter tour headlining tour in support of the album with The Devil Wears Prada and Dark Tranquillity; during the time, All That Remains vocalist Philip Labonte was substituting for Jones until he could return. On March 18, 2010, original vocalist Jesse Leach returned to the band for a series of songs. From then on, Leach and Labonte performed as substitute vocalists for the remainder of the tour.

== Critical reception ==
Professional ratings
Aggregate scores
| Source | Rating |
|---|---|
| Metacritic | 72/100 |
Review scores
| Source | Rating |
| AllMusic | 3.5/5 stars |
| Alternative Press | 4/5 stars |
| Billboard | 5/10 |
| Blabbermouth.net | 5/10 |
| Decibel | 7/10 |
| NME | 8/10 |
| PopMatters | 5/10 |
| Metal.de | 8/10 |

The review aggregator site Metacritic scored the album a 72 out of 100, based on the reviews of 6 critics, which indicates "generally favorable reviews". While praise has been generated around Howard Jones' vocals, criticism has been directed towards Adam Dutkiewicz's and Brendan O'Brien's production as well as the band's reliance on formula.

James Christopher Monger of AllMusic gave the album a positive review, scoring the album a 3.5 out of 5 and considering it "the group's most commercially viable collection of progressive/thrash/emo-metal to date. Where 2006's 'As Daylight Dies' hinted at an accelerated focus on the more melodic aspects of extreme metal, Killswitch Engage cements the notion." Monger indicated "Starting Over", "Reckoning", and "A Light in a Darkened World" as his AMG track picks. Alternative Press gave a positive review as well, scoring the album a 4 out of 5, saying "this album isn't going to change the way you think about metal, but Killswitch Engage aren't Mastodon; they just want to get the pit going, and this album will surely accomplish that."

However, Christa Titus of Billboard gave the album a mixed review, scoring it a 50 out of 100. While positively commenting, "As an act that forsakes breakdowns and unintelligible screaming in favor of focused aggression and predictable melodic swells, you can't help but enjoy such quintessential Killswitch Engage tracks as 'Never Again' or the Metallica-esque chords that open 'The Forgotten,' the review concluded, "Aside from a few unique moments ('The Return,' 'Take Me Away'), there's not much new to report here."

Adrien Begrand of PopMatters gave a mixed review as well, scoring the album a 5 out of 10. While praising Howard Jones' vocals, commenting "With its contemplative tone and sense of melodrama, the contagious 'Starting Over' borders on post-hardcore and features some of Jones's strongest vocal melodies to date," and "'Reckoning' and 'This is Goodbye' feature some very effective melodic death metal touches reminiscent of Swedish stars In Flames and Soilwork, while 'The Return' is a daring foray into teary-eyed power balladry, a terrific showcase for Jones," the review criticized Adam Dutkiewicz's and Brendan O'Brien's overall production, commenting, "Unfortunately, though, the production by Dutkiewicz and mainstream go-to guy Brendan O'Brien strips the guitars of any bite whatsoever, rendering the overall tone surprisingly muddy and often flaccid, something we notice most on tracks like 'Never Again' and 'The Forgotten', which play up the crunchy riffs, but completely lack the power they deserve on record."

The record won best international album at the 2009 Bandit Rock awards.

== Track listing ==
All lyrics are written by Howard Jones; all music is composed by Killswitch Engage.

| No. | Title | Length |
|---|---|---|
| 1. | "Never Again" | 3:09 |
| 2. | "Starting Over" | 3:51 |
| 3. | "The Forgotten" | 3:17 |
| 4. | "Reckoning" | 2:40 |
| 5. | "The Return" | 4:28 |
| 6. | "A Light in a Darkened World" | 2:50 |
| 7. | "Take Me Away" | 2:45 |
| 8. | "I Would Do Anything" | 3:22 |
| 9. | "Save Me" | 3:46 |
| 10. | "Lost" | 3:45 |
| 11. | "This Is Goodbye" | 4:17 |
| Total length: | | 38:09 |

iTunes pre-order exclusive track
| No. | Title | Length |
|---|---|---|
| 12. | "A Light in a Darkened World" (Live) | 3:05 |

Special edition bonus tracks
| No. | Title | Length |
|---|---|---|
| 12. | "In a Dead World" | 4:14 |
| 13. | "Rose of Sharyn" (Live) | 3:48 |
| 14. | "My Curse" (Live) | 4:26 |
| 15. | "Holy Diver (Dio cover)" (Live) | 5:07 |

Special edition DVD

1. 'Making of' documentary
2. Exclusive band interviews

== Personnel ==
Killswitch Engage

- Mike D'Antonio – bass, digital design, artwork photography, layout design
- Adam Dutkiewicz – lead guitar, backing vocals, co-producer, recording assistant, engineering, mixing, guitars and bass recording
- Justin Foley – drums
- Howard Jones – lead vocals
- Joel Stroetzel – rhythm guitar, backing vocals

Production

- Brendan O'Brien – producer
- Tom Tapley, Jim Fogarty, Martin Cooke, Kory Aaron – recording assistants
- Mala Sharma and Jackie O'Brien – production coordinators
- Billy Bowers – assistant engineer
- Ted Jensen – mastering at Sterling Sound, New York, NY
- Nick DiDia – drums and vocals recording

Management

- Vaughn Lewis and Kenny Gabor for Channel Zero Entertainment
- Mike Gitter – A&R
- Mark Scribner – business management at PS Business Management
- Nick Ferrara and Mike McKoy – legal representation at Serling, Rooks & Ferrara, LLP
- Tim Borror – U.S. booking at The Agency Group
- Paul Ryan – international booking at The Agency Group

Artwork

- Travis Shinn – group photography

== Charts ==
| Chart (2009) | Peak position |
|---|---|
| Australian ARIA Albums Chart | 12 |
| Austrian Albums Chart | 36 |
| Canadian Albums Chart | 11 |
| Dutch Albums Chart | 77 |
| Finnish Albums Chart | 15 |
| German Albums Chart | 27 |
| Japanese Albums Chart | 60 |
| New Zealand Top 40 Albums Chart | 24 |
| Swedish Albums Chart | 52 |
| Swiss Albums Chart | 51 |
| UK Rock and Metal Albums | 9 |
| US Billboard 200 | 7 |
| US Hard Rock Albums | 1 |
| US Top Rock Albums | 3 |
| US Top Alternative Albums | 2 |
| US Top Rock & Alternative Albums | 3 |
| US Top Album Sales | 7 |
