= Killswitch Engage (2000 album) =

Studio album by Killswitch Engage
- Released: July 4, 2000
- Recorded: 1999–2000
- Studios: Zing Studios, Westfield, Massachusetts
- Genre: Melodic metalcore
- Length: 31:51
- Label: Ferret
- Producer: Adam Dutkiewicz

Killswitch Engage chronology
| Killswitch Engage (2000) | Alive or Just Breathing (2002) |

Professional ratings
Review scores
| Source | Rating |
|---|---|
| Allmusic | 3/5 stars |
| Classic Rock | 2/5 stars |
| Collector's Guide to Heavy Metal | 6/10 |

Killswitch Engage is the debut studio album by the American metalcore band Killswitch Engage, released July 4, 2000, through Ferret Music. It was the only album by the band released through Ferret as they would later sign with Roadrunner Records. The band's debut is considered to be one of the first ever successful albums in the metalcore genre, garnering a re-release five years after its original pressing. No songs in the album were released as singles.

In 2020, it was named one of the 20 best metal albums of 2000 by Metal Hammer magazine.

== History ==
The song "Soilborn" was the first song the band ever wrote, which took shape during the band's first jam session together, also mentioned in From the Bedroom to the Basement. The band wrote the entire album's music without a singer, until Jesse Leach of local band Nothing Stays Gold (who were signed to Dutkiewicz's brother Tobias' record label, Tobias also being the singer for Aftershock) joined the band shortly after its formation. Many of the songs were then recorded for a demo, which included "Soilborn", before the recording of the band's debut full-length.

While writing the album, bassist D'Antonio asked Ferret Music if they could sign his band as a favor since D'Antonio illustrated the covers for some of the albums released through the label. Ferret were said to have signed Killswitch Engage mainly because metal was becoming less and less popular at the time, and representatives felt that they might be the last metal band they would ever sign.

The tracks "Temple from the Within" and "Vide Infra" were re-recorded for Alive or Just Breathing (2002), while "Irreversal" was re-recorded for The End of Heartache (2004) and "In the Unblind" was re-recorded for the Alive or Just Breathing 2005 re-release bonus disc.

In 2004, Ferret Music also released a remastered version of the album, with four demo tracks from a 1999 demo, which was originally sold at a show within which Killswitch Engage, Shadows Fall and In Flames played together at The Palladium in Worcester, Massachusetts, which apparently sold incredibly well, as said in the documentary feature From the Bedroom to the Basement from the live DVD (Set This) World Ablaze. Subsequent releases in 2005 and 2007 were handled by Roadrunner Records.

They played the album in its entirety on their 2022 live album Live at the Palladium.

== Track listing ==
All tracks are written by Killswitch Engage, except "One Last Sunset", written by Adam Dutkiewicz.

| No. | Title | Length |
|---|---|---|
| 1. | "Temple from the Within" | 4:07 |
| 2. | "Vide Infra" | 3:32 |
| 3. | "Irreversal" | 4:17 |
| 4. | "Rusted Embrace" | 4:29 |
| 5. | "Prelude" | 1:55 |
| 6. | "Soilborn" | 3:29 |
| 7. | "Numb Sickened Eyes" | 3:35 |
| 8. | "In the Unblind" | 3:00 |
| 9. | "One Last Sunset" | 3:49 |
| Total length: | | 31:51 |

Reissue bonus tracks
| No. | Title | Length |
|---|---|---|
| 10. | "Prelude" (Demo) | 2:03 |
| 11. | "Soilborn" (Demo) | 3:19 |
| 12. | "Vide Infra" (Demo) | 3:28 |
| 13. | "In the Unblind" (Demo) | 2:48 |
| Total length: | | 43:29 |

== Personnel ==
Killswitch Engage

- Jesse Leach – vocals
- Joel Stroetzel – guitars
- Mike D'Antonio – bass
- Adam Dutkiewicz – drums

Production

- Produced by Adam Dutkiewicz
- Mastered by Keith Chirgwin
