= Joel Stroetzel =

American guitarist

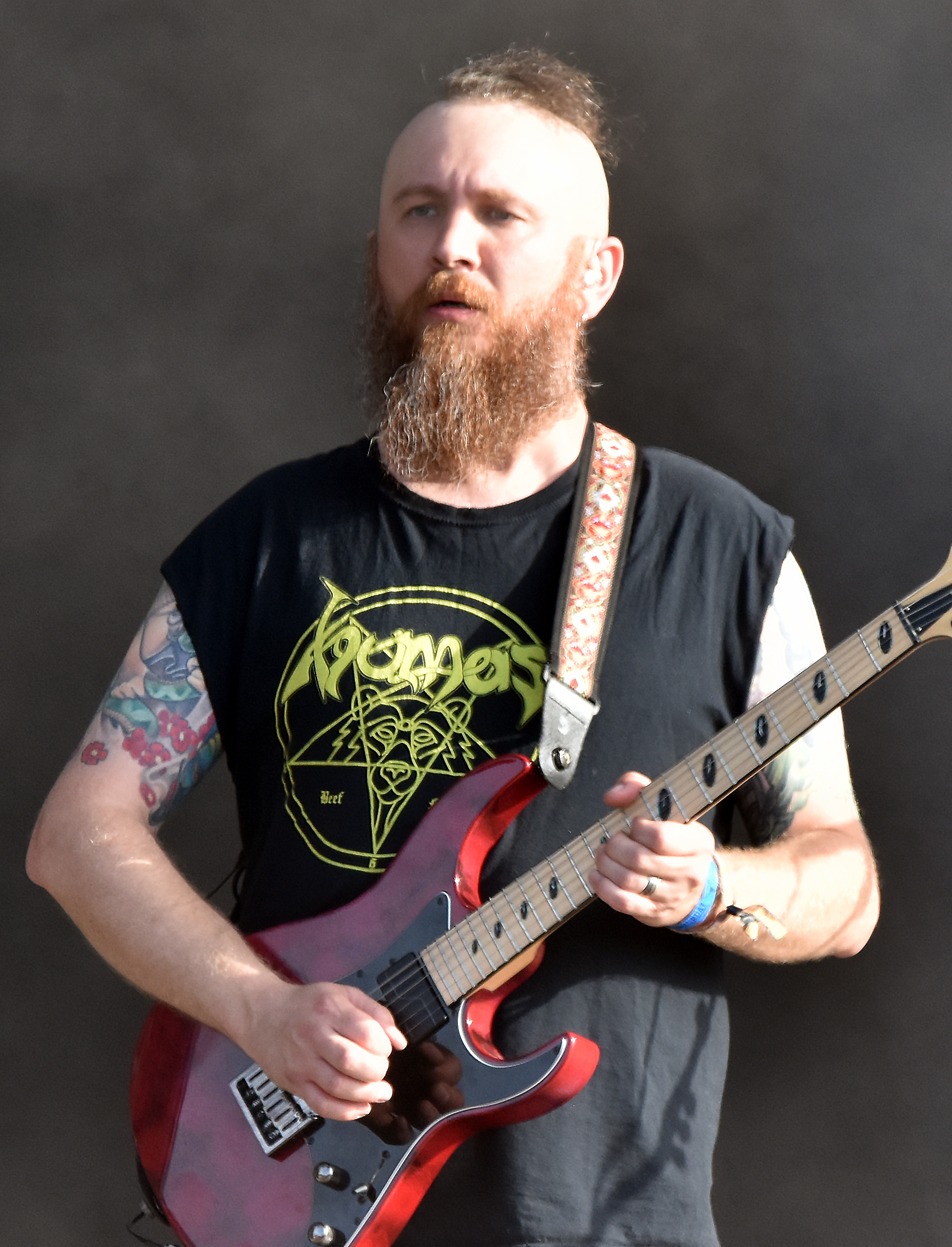
- Stroetzel in 2023

Background information
- Born: July 24, 1980 (age 46)
- Genres: Melodic metalcore
- Occupation: Musician
- Instrument: Guitar
- Years active: 1996–present
- Member of: Killswitch Engage
- Formerly of: Aftershock
- Website: killswitchengage.com

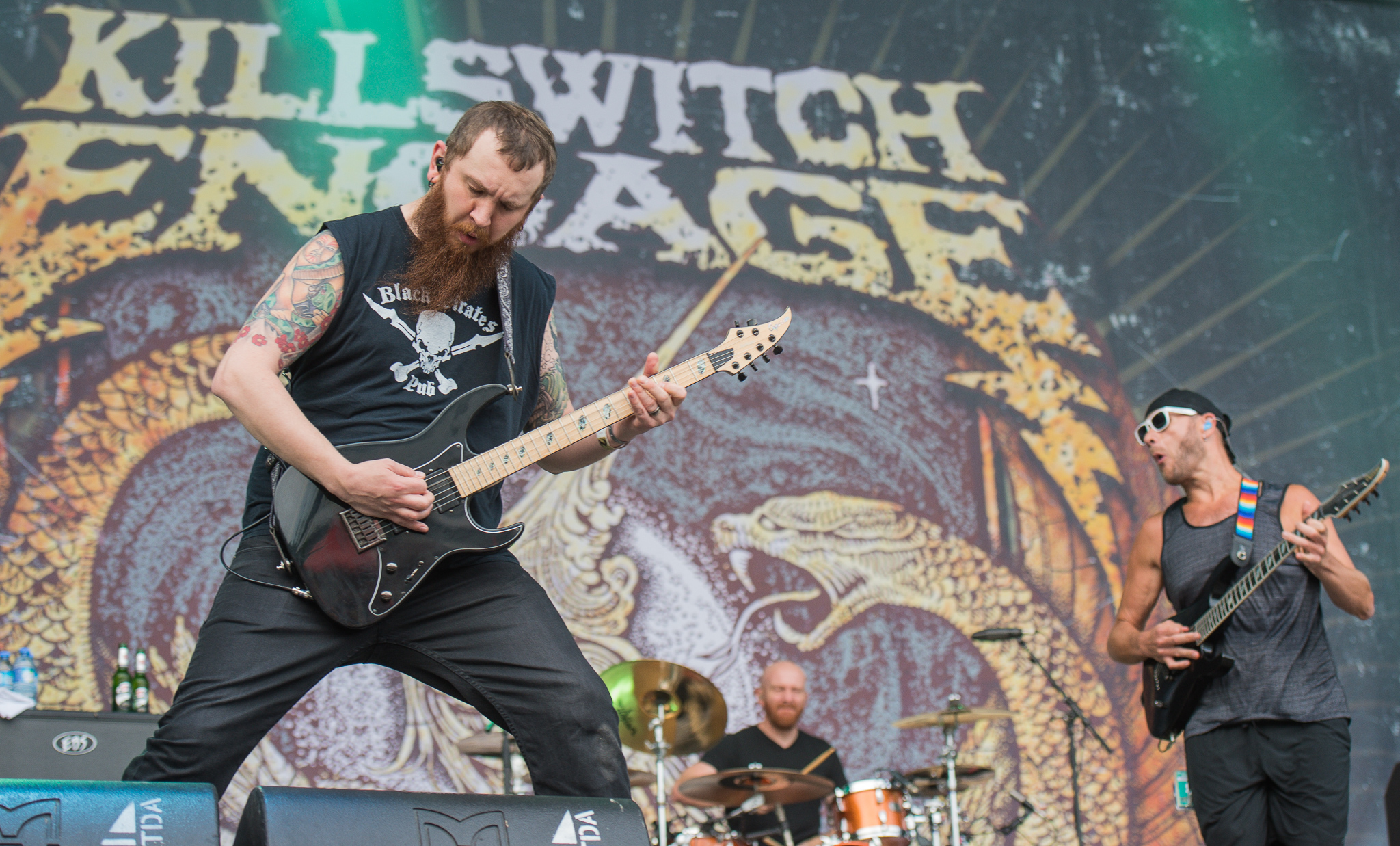
Stroetzel performing with Killswitch Engage in 2016

Joel Michael Stroetzel (born July 24, 1980) is an American musician, best known as the rhythm guitarist from the Massachusetts metalcore band Killswitch Engage.

== Background ==
Stroetzel originally played piano in his youth, but after hearing Guns N' Roses for the first time, switched to playing guitar. He began to teach guitar lessons at a local music store (Performance Music) while in high school and played in the Westfield High School Jazz Band. He attended the Berklee College of Music in Boston but did not graduate. Stroetzel's guitar style is influenced by Slayer, Anthrax, Zakk Wylde, as stated on the World Ablaze DVD. He is married to a Canadian woman.

== Career ==
While at college, Stroetzel began playing in the band Aftershock. The band broke up in 1999 after only releasing one album that same year. Joel then helped form Killswitch Engage with co-guitarist Adam Dutkiewicz and bass player Mike D'Antonio. The group's self-titled album was released a year later in 2000. The band garnered success in 2002 with their sophomore album Alive or Just Breathing. The group then continued with success with The End of Heartache (2004) and As Daylight Dies (2007). The group have been considered one of the more influential bands in the metalcore genre and have released 9 total albums, along with being nominated for 3 Grammy Awards for Best Metal Performance. Joel plays the guitar solo in the track "Holy Diver" and is seen occasionally singing during live renditions of "The End of Heartache".

Stroetzel has also performed with the band Times of Grace as a touring musician.

In the mid 2010s, he started a side project alongside one of his friends called Brothers Born, which he described as more “folky rock and indie.”

Stroetzel has helped with some production for Killswitch Engage and indie bands. In 2016 he served as a co producer for his brother Tyler’s band City Of Homes EP, What Life Remains. In 2024 he produced Hero And The Horror album Old Ghosts.

== Equipment ==
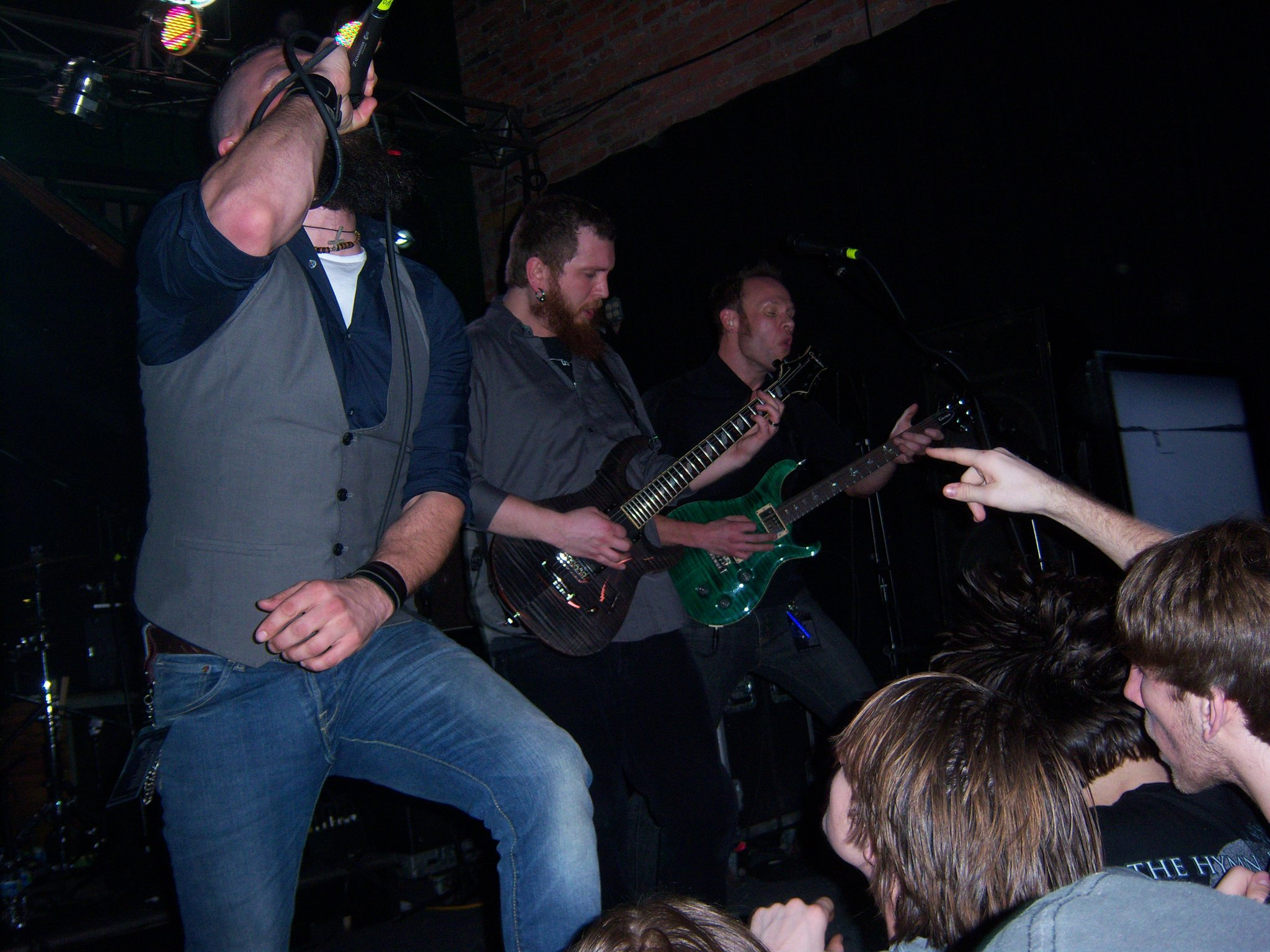
Joel Stroetzel (in middle) performing in Times of Grace along with Jesse Leach and Adam Dutkiewicz.

Stroetzel has used a wide variety of guitars and amps throughout his career, including the Mesa/Boogie Roadster and Triple Rectifier heads, a Marshall JCM900, a modified Soldano SLO-100, and a Hughes and Kettner TriAmp MKII, which he did not like for metal because he said it "didn't hold together well." He has also used the Framus Cobra and Dragon, the Peavey 5150, the Splawn Nitro, the Diezel VH4, and the Fuchs Viper for distorted tones, and the Fender Twin '65 Reverb and Vox AC30 for clean tones. He is currently endorsed by Laney Amplification, used their Ironheart series of amplifiers and currently using Tony Iommi's signature amplifier TI-100.

Joel is endorsed by Caparison Guitars and uses the Caparison Dellinger, Horus, TAT, and Angelus models. Caparison produces the Dellinger-JSM – Joel Stroetzel Signature Model. It has a Caparison Fixed Bridge and through body stringing, with Fishman Fluence Killswitch Engage Signature pickups, a walnut top, mahogany back, and a 5-piece maple and walnut neck. It is the first Caparison guitar to have a pick guard. He also had another signature model which is similar to an Angelus, but with a narrower body and longer horns, somewhat a cross between a TAT Special and an Angelus.

In his current live amp rig, he uses both Laney amps, making use of a Laney Iommi head with a Celestion Vintage 30-loaded Laney Iommi 4x12 cabinet for his distorted tones, and a Laney Lionheart 1x12 combo for clean tones.

For his current live effects rig, he makes use of a Maxon OD808 Overdrive, Maxon AD-9 delay, Maxon CP-9 Pro+ compressor, Boss Corporation NS-2 Noise Suppressor, Boss ABY switcher, Jet City JetDirect DI box, and a Korg DTR2000 tuner. For wireless, he uses an Audio-Technica 5000 Series.

He currently uses D'Addario EXL115 (.011–.049) strings and Planet Waves Black Ice 1.10mm picks.

== Discography ==
=== Aftershock ===
- Through the Looking Glass (1999)
- Five Steps From Forever EP (2000)

=== Killswitch Engage ===
- Killswitch Engage (2000)
- Alive or Just Breathing (2002)
- The End of Heartache (2004)
- As Daylight Dies (2006)
- Killswitch Engage (2009)
- Disarm the Descent (2013)
- Incarnate (2016)
- Atonement (2019)
- This Consequence (2025)

=== Brothers Born ===
- Knife Wounds (2015)
