= Alive or Just Breathing =

Studio album by Killswitch Engage
- Released: May 21, 2002
- Recorded: October 2001 – February 2002
- Studios: Zing Studios, Westfield, Massachusetts
- Genre: Melodic metalcore
- Length: 44:57
- Label: Roadrunner
- Producer: Adam Dutkiewicz

Killswitch Engage chronology
Killswitch Engage (2000)	Alive or Just Breathing (2002)	The End of Heartache (2004)

Singles from Alive or Just Breathing
- 1. "Self Revolution" Released: 2002; 2. "My Last Serenade" Released: March 5, 2002; 3. "The Element of One" Released: 2003

Alive or Just Breathing is the second studio album by the American metalcore band Killswitch Engage. It was released on May 21, 2002, through Roadrunner Records. Alive or Just Breathing was Killswitch Engage's first album on Roadrunner and was recorded from October 2001 to February 2002. Produced by drummer and guitarist Adam Dutkiewicz, this was the band's first album on a major label, which prompted them to write and record the album to the best of their abilities. Alive or Just Breathing has been viewed as a landmark album in the metalcore genre and was well praised upon its release by fans and critics. The lyrics, which were all written by vocalist Jesse Leach, were intended to bring a positive message through the music.

Shortly after the release of Alive or Just Breathing, Leach left the band for personal and health issues. Killswitch Engage quickly recruited Howard Jones to replace Leach. Jones would stay in the band for nearly ten years, until his departure in 2012, which prompted Leach to rejoin the band on the ten-year anniversary of Alive or Just Breathing. This is also the last album to feature Dutkiewicz on drums, as he would switch to guitar before the touring process. The drumming position was filled by Tom Gomes.

== Background ==
In June 2000, Killswitch Engage released their debut album, titled Killswitch Engage through Ferret Records. The band got its recording deal as a favor for the artwork bassist Mike D'Antonio created for Ferret. The label's CEO, Carl Severson signed the band without a contract simply to get the album out to the public because he thought the album "ruled", and stated "I had a one-off deal and when I knew they wanted to go someplace bigger, I figured it was in my best interest, as their friend, to make the best thing happen for them." After the album was released, Severson showed it to Roadrunner Records A&R man, Mike Gitter.

Gitter played the album for other Roadrunner employees and stated "The feeling was this was something that touched upon classic metal, pulls it up through hardcore, and creates something fairly new and completely exciting. When their music started circulating around the office, there was an immediate 'Holy ... this is great!' feeling about it. People weren't halfway about it." Gitter offered to sign the band to the label and felt that signing Killswitch Engage was the label's last chance to have any heavy metal bands on the roster. The band was apprehensive at first, judging by the artist roster of Roadrunner at the time, but after nearly six months of deliberation, Killswitch Engage signed to Roadrunner due to the opportunities it provided for them. After signing, the band began work on their major label debut, which would become Alive or Just Breathing. Gitter has claimed that signing Killswitch Engage was the most gratifying signing of his career.

== Writing and recording ==
=== Writing ===
In summer of 2001, Killswitch Engage recorded a demo produced by drummer/guitarist Adam Dutkiewicz which featured the songs "Transfiguration" (which would later become "Fixation on the Darkness"), "Just Barely Breathing", and "Numbered Days". After giving the demo to Roadrunner, the label agreed to let Dutkiewicz produce Alive or Just Breathing because they were impressed with his production skills.

As Killswitch Engage started writing for Alive or Just Breathing, then-guitarist Pete Cortese, who co-wrote "Fixation on the Darkness", left the band to spend more with his family. The music for Alive or Just Breathing was all written by Dutkiewicz, D'Antonio, and guitarist Joel Stroetzel, while all of the lyrics were written by singer Jesse Leach. After completing the composition for the album, the band knew they would need to find a second guitarist to play with Stroetzel, because Alive or Just Breathing was written for two guitarists during live performances.

Taking into account that this would be the band's first album on a major label, Killswitch Engage was adamant on making the best album that they could. This required Dutkiewicz to spend more time in the studio producing and writing songs as a whole, rather than just a collection of guitar riffs put together. D'Antonio stated the writing process for the record went very fast as he wrote the "moshy, hardcore" style riffs, Stroetzel wrote the thrash metal styled riffs, and Dutkiewicz wrote the "catchy" choruses. Leach said that his main goal when writing lyrics was to be used as an instrument to shine the light of God through his music. He felt that music lyrics in general featured too much negativity and wanted to have positivity shown in his. Jesse has also stated in an Instagram comment that the album Life. Love. Regret. by Unbroken was massively influential to the lyrics of Alive or Just Breathing.

In a 2025 interview with Metal Hammer, vocalist Jesse Leach discussed the personal turmoil that created the album’s biggest hit "My Last Serenade," revealing how the lyrics came from a "really dark place" during his struggles with mental health.

Alive or Just Breathing was the last album the band all worked on together in the same room until 2025’s This Consequence.

=== Recording ===
On November 3, 2001, Killswitch Engage entered Zing Studios in Westfield, Massachusetts to begin recording Alive or Just Breathing. Upon entering the studio, the album already had its title, derived from a lyric in the song "Just Barely Breathing." The band members all had jobs and some were going to school during the recording of the album, so each member came in for short periods as they had time available. Stroetzel said this was helpful, as it reduced stress, but regretted that they were not able to get more done in one session. A problem that D'Antonio, Dutkiewicz, and Stroetzel encountered was keeping their guitars in tune during the sessions. They spent a large amount of the recording budget buying new guitars to improve the tuning. Since the recording of Alive or Just Breathing, they have learned how to keep in tune better as they record.

"My Last Serenade"
Sample of "My Last Serenade" from Alive or Just Breathing (2002). Jesse Leach had troubles recording his vocals for Alive or Just Breathing, but was pleased with the end result. Much of the album contains a balance of screaming and clean vocals.

Jesse Leach had troubles gaining confidence as he was recording his vocals, but was determined to make them a "masterpiece". Leach spoke of Dutkiewicz and recording vocals stating, "I definitely hand it to Adam D. – he's the man. We're taking our time, dissecting things. It's made me push myself to my limits – getting a lot more passion and deliver out of what I'm doing." After struggling with nervousness for a while, Dutkiewicz and Leach went to Leach's home in Rhode Island to finish recording vocals. Mike Gitter was reluctant to hear of this when Killswitch Engage turned the record into Roadrunner, but was ultimately pleased with the results. Before the completion of the record, the band brought in Tom Gomes to play drums as Dutkiewicz moved to the empty guitar position. Though Dutkiewicz recorded most of the drums himself, Gomes provided additional percussion on the album, before he was an official member of the band. Backing vocals on Alive or Just Breathing were done by Leach, Dutkiewicz, as well as Dutkiewicz's sister Becka, and All That Remains singer Philip Labonte.

During the Alive or Just Breathing recording sessions, Killswitch Engage recorded 15 songs. Three of the songs were re-recordings of songs from the band's debut album. Stroetzel stated that the band decided to re-record "Temple From the Within", "Vide Infra", and "In the Unblind" because at the time, Killswitch Engage was unsure of how many people would ever hear Killswitch Engage because it was released through a small label. "Temple From the Within" and "Vide Infra" made it onto Alive or Just Breathing. "In the Unblind" and two newly written songs titled "When the Balance is Broken" and "Untitled and Unloved" respectively, did not make it on to the album, but would eventually be heard on the 2005 reissue of Alive or Just Breathing.

Alive or Just Breathing was mixed in February 2002 at Backstage Productions in Ripley, Derbyshire, UK by Andy Sneap. Dutkiewicz brought the album to the UK and oversaw the mixing process. The band chose Sneap after hearing good things about his work. The band and label were both very pleased with the mix, and Dutkiewicz in particular noted his satisfaction with the drum tones.

=== Artwork and packaging ===
Mike D'Antonio owns a graphic design company called Darkicon Designs and has made album covers and various other pieces of art (T-shirts, posters, logos, etc.) for bands such as Shadows Fall, All That Remains, Crowbar among others. Killswitch Engage made sure to have written in their contract with Roadrunner that D'Antonio would produce all of the band's artwork. D'Antonio stated about the cover of Alive or Just Breathing, "I wanted something that looked 'old school cut-and-paste' for the cover. Something with texture that appeared like it was just laid down and photographed. I remember Roadrunner hating the cover, saying there was too much going on and nothing to focus on. I told them I did not agree, and that some day they would get it."

== Release ==
Alive or Just Breathing was released on May 21, 2002. Killswitch Engage filmed a music video for the song "My Last Serenade", which gained heavy rotation on MTV's Headbangers Ball and propelled the album to number 37 on Billboard's Top Heatseekers chart. Alive or Just Breathing also stayed at number one on CMJ's Loud Rock radio chart for over a month. By the time the band's third album, The End of Heartache was released, Alive or Just Breathing sold 114,000 copies in the United States. Music videos were also filmed for "Life to Lifeless" and "Fixation on the Darkness". Upon the release of the album, Killswitch Engage embarked on their first nationwide tour, supporting Soilwork and Hypocrisy and would tour for the next year in support of Alive or Just Breathing. Other legs of the tour featured the band touring with acts such as Kittie, Poison the Well, Shadows Fall, and Hotwire.

Missing his wife whom he had married two weeks prior to the tour, Jesse Leach left Killswitch Engage in the middle of their first national tour. With a combination of depression, missing his wife, and throat problems, Leach sent D'Antonio an email just a few days before the band was scheduled to play a show, announcing his departure. D'Antonio stated in an interview that "after three years of hanging out with the dude, and considering him a brother, to just get an email was a little bit harsh." Killswitch Engage very quickly set up auditions to fill the vocalist position in the band and eventually settled on Howard Jones, who was at the time the frontman of Blood Has Been Shed. Jones very quickly had to learn a set of songs to tour with the band. Leach and the rest of the band quickly reconciled and remained close friends.

After the touring process for the album was over, Tom Gomes left the band and was replaced by Justin Foley. This line-up of Killswitch Engage would last until early 2012, when Jones left the band. Following Jones' departure, Jesse Leach rejoined the band on the ten-year anniversary of Alive or Just Breathing.

In 2005, as part of Roadrunner's 25th anniversary, the label re-released Alive or Just Breathing as a special edition. The re-release included a bonus enhanced cd with all of the songs left over from the album's recording sessions, as well as a re-recorded version of "Fixation on the Darkness", featuring Jones on lead vocals, a track of studio outtakes and music videos for "My Last Serenade", "Fixation on the Darkness", and "Life to Lifeless". The special edition also included expanded artwork and a biography documenting the recording and release of the album.

== Reception and legacy ==
Professional ratings
Review scores
Source	Rating
411mania.com	7.0/10
AllMusic	4/5 stars
Blabbermouth.net	10/10
CMJ	positive
Collector's Guide to Heavy Metal	5/10
Kerrang!	5/5 stars
Lambgoat	8/10
Metal Review	9.2/10
Ultimate Guitar	10/10
PunkNews	5/5 stars

Alive or Just Breathing was met with rave reviews. Erik Thomas from Metalreview.com said "while this album certainly is responsible for the vast amount of saturation, it stands as a pretty trendsetting, stellar must-own example of metalcore." Jason D. Taylor of AllMusic stated "This is a pure metal album that seemingly has ignored any fashionable trend and instead relies solely on skill and expertise to sculpt some of meatiest heavy metal since the glory days of Metallica and Slayer." Taylor also expressed the impressiveness of the band's "do-it-yourself" work ethic as Dutkiewicz handled all production and D'Antonio "took the time to give much thought on the album's packaging and art direction." Dom Lawson of Kerrang! magazine gave the album five "Ks" (or five out of five stars). He praised the album's unique new sound, music, and vocal performances from Leach. Kevin Boyce of CMJ said, "This album is more addictive than crack cocaine that's been smothered in caffeine and nicotine and drenched with chocolate. Starting with the track 'Numbered Days,' this 12-track platter never takes its foot off of the throttle." Boyce also stated his favorite song from the album was "My Last Serenade," and applauded "Just Barely Breathing," comparing parts of it to Metallica's Ride the Lightning.

Reviewing the 2005 re-release of the album, Scott Alisoglu of Blabbermouth.net said that Alive or Just Breathing is "one special album" and that its release "marked a defining moment in metal." Alisoglu also viewed the album as one of the greatest albums of 2002 and of "the new century." Alive or Just Breathing is one of only 21 albums to have a perfect site rating on Blabbermouth.net. In 2009, MetalSucks compiled a list of the "21 Best Metal Albums of the 21st Century So Far" based on the opinions of various musicians, managers, publicists, label representatives and writers, where Alive or Just Breathing was placed at number four on the list. Noisecreep posted a list of the top 10 best metal albums of the past decade in 2010, where the album was listed at number six.

In the Fall and Winter of 2012, Killswitch Engage toured in celebration of the albums 10 year anniversary alongside Shadows Fall and Acaro. Also in 2012 the Alive or Just Breathing became the 94th album to be inducted into the Decibel Hall of Fame. The publication added "With songs like "Numbered Days," "Fixation on the Darkness," live favorite "My Last Serenade" and "Life to Lifeless," Killswitch Engage questioned musical boundaries of metal and hardcore and proved commercial inviability wrong. They didn’t just open doors—they blasted them off the frames."

In a 2018 retrospective of the album by Metal Injection they called Alive or Just Breathing a genre staple. The publication stated "A staple of what is now known as metalcore, this album established a sound to an emerging genre rebirth and breathed new life and a new energy into the American metal scene."

Alive or Just Breathing is also noted as a significant influence on many bands to follow, such as Jinjer, August Burns Red and Miss May I. Bring Me the Horizon's vocalist Oliver Sykes has admitted that the album got him into metal and inspired his "taste for heavy music."

In a review for 411mania.com, Evocator Manes stated his dislike for the melodic "smooth parts" that he felt were too repetitious throughout Alive or Just Breathing, however he praised the album's production and positive lyrics. Jesse Leach stated there was a small portion of Killswitch Engage fans who disliked his use of clean singing on the album.

In 2020, John Hill of Loudwire included the album in his list of the "Top 25 Metalcore Albums of All Time."

In 2025 Revolver Magazine cited the album among one of the top 10 most influential metalcore records. Stating "The album finalized the divorce proceedings between hardcore and metalcore by reaching beyond Poison the Well’s vulnerable emo yelps and planting soaring, anthemic clean vocals into the metalcore orchard. The album’s clean-chorus/screamed-verse structure has become the genre’s most distinguishing feature ever since, and an entire generation of bands — Darkest Hour, Unearth, Shadows Fall and As I Lay Dying, to name just a few — followed in its footsteps."

=== Accolades ===
Publication	Country	Accolade	Year	Rank
Hit Parader	US	Top 10 New Wave American Metal Albums of All Time	2007	1
MetalSucks	US	21 Best Metal Albums of the 21st Century So Far	2009	4
Decibel	US	The Top 100 Greatest Metal Albums of the Decade	2010	37
Noisecreep	US	Best Albums of the 2000s	2009	6
Kerrang!	UK	The 21 Best Metalcore Albums of All Time	2018	N/R
Loudwire	US	25 Best Metalcore Albums of All Time	2020	4
Metal Hammer	UK	Top 20 Best Metalcore Albums	2020	N/R
Revolver	UK	Top 10 Most Influential Metalcore Albums of All Time	2021	N/R
Loudwire	US	Top 10 Albums of 2002	2022	6
Loudwire	US	The 100 Best Rock + Metal Albums of the 21st Century	2023	25
Consequence	US	Top 75 Metal Albums of All Time	2025	62

- The album was inducted into the Decibel Hall of Fame in 2012.
- In December of 2012 the album was inducted into the Rock Sound Hall of Fame

== Track listing ==
All lyrics are written by Jesse Leach.

No.	Title	Writer(s)	Length
1.	"Numbered Days"	Killswitch Engage	3:35
2.	"Self Revolution"	Killswitch Engage	3:08
3.	"Fixation on the Darkness"	Killswitch Engage, Pete Cortese	3:37
4.	"My Last Serenade"	Killswitch Engage	4:13
5.	"Life to Lifeless"	Killswitch Engage	3:17
6.	"Just Barely Breathing"	Killswitch Engage	5:42
7.	"To the Sons of Man"	Killswitch Engage	1:58
8.	"Temple from the Within (re-recorded)"	Killswitch Engage	4:04
9.	"The Element of One"	Killswitch Engage	4:08
10.	"Vide Infra (re-recorded)"	Killswitch Engage	3:28
11.	"Without a Name" (Instrumental)	Killswitch Engage	1:45
12.	"Rise Inside"	Killswitch Engage	5:56
Total length:			44:57

2005 re-release bonus disc
No.	Title	Length
1.	"In the Unblind (re-recorded)"	2:48
2.	"When the Balance is Broken"	4:35
3.	"Untitled and Unloved" (Instrumental)	3:20
4.	"Numbered Days" (Demo)	3:37
5.	"Transfiguration" (Demo – early version of "Fixation on the Darkness")	3:38
6.	"Just Barely Breathing" (Demo)	5:13
7.	"Fixation on the Darkness" (Re-recorded version with Howard Jones on lead vocals)	3:37
8.	"AOJB studio outtakes"	1:17
Total length:		28:05

== Personnel ==
Killswitch Engage

- Jesse Leach – lead vocals
- Joel Stroetzel – guitars
- Mike D'Antonio – bass
- Adam Dutkiewicz – drums, additional guitars, piano, backing vocals

Additional musicians

- Becka Dutkiewicz – backing vocals
- Philip Labonte – backing vocals
- Tom Gomes – additional drumming
- Howard Jones – lead vocals on "Fixation on the Darkness (re-recorded version)

Technical staff and photography

- Adam Dutkiewicz – production, engineering
- Andy Sneap – mixing and mastering
- Daniel Moss – photography
- Mike D'Antonio – art direction and design

== Charts ==
Chart (2002)	Peak position
UK Albums (OCC)	122
UK Rock & Metal Albums (OCC)	15
US Heatseekers (Billboard)	37

Chart (2025)	Peak position
Hungarian Physical Albums (MAHASZ)	15

== Certifications ==
Region	Certification	Certified units/sales
United Kingdom (BPI)	Silver	60,000^{^}
^{^} Shipments figures based on certification alone.
