= DR Strings =

Manufacturer of guitar strings

- Type: Private
- Industry: Musical instruments
- Founded: 1989
- Founder: Mark Dronge; Dr. Benzion Rapoport
- Headquarters: Westwood, New Jersey 07675
- Products: Dragon Skin+ Acoustic, Electric and Bass strings; Pure Blues Electric and Bass Strings; Hi Beam and Black Beauty Bass Strings; Musical instrument accessories
- Website: https://www.drstrings.com

DR Strings is a manufacturer of guitar and bass strings located in Westwood, New Jersey.

== History ==
DR was founded in 1989 by Mark Dronge, son of the Guild Guitar Company's founder Alfred Dronge, and Dr. Benzion Rapoport. At the time, making strings with semi-automatic machinery and computer-assisted machinery was becoming more prevalent. DR strings continues to make their strings by hand, making use of American-made materials in their strings.

== Users ==
Some notable users (past and current) of DR Strings include:

- Stanley Clarke
- Johnny Winter
- Derek Trucks
- Sting
- Verdine White
- Victor Wooten
- Melissa Etheridge
- Beyoncé
- Lady Gaga
- Bruno Mars
- Martín Méndez
