= Fishman (company) =

Fishman Company

- Type: Private
- Industry: Music equipment
- Founded: 1981; 45 years ago in Andover, Massachusetts
- Headquarters: 3 Riverside Dr, Andover, MA 01810-1122, United States
- Number of locations: 1
- Key people: Larry Fishman
- Products: Guitar pickups
- Website: www.fishman.com

Fishman (established 1981) is an American company based in Andover, Massachusetts, known for making guitar pickups and other products involved in the amplification of acoustic guitars and other stringed instruments.

== History ==
In 1980 Larry Fishman made a prototype acoustic pickup in his basement, and by 1981 he had taken orders for pickups from the Guild Guitar Company. In 1982 the C.F. Martin Guitar Company ordered Fishman pickups; to accommodate it, Fishman and his company rented a larger manufacturing space, and began designing and making pickups for banjos, mandolins, violins, cellos and basses as well.

The company has also produced amplifiers and other guitar-related equipment since its beginning in 1981. They have been particularly known for producing high-quality acoustic amplifiers.

=== Fishman Fluence ===
In 2012 the company began working on a new pickup for electric guitars. Most guitar pickups are made with wire coiled around a magnet. The Fluence was a solid-core pickup with a conventional magnet and two 48-layer circuit boards—a completely new approach, using techniques previously used in the aerospace and telecommunications sectors. Fishman hired Ching-Yu Lin, Ph.D. to analyze and charge the magnets used in their pickups. The company was able to control the consistency of the magnets and the stacked solid core to make each pickup consistent. They began manufacturing the new product in 2014.

Fishman continues to design and make pickups for guitar makers, including Paul Reed Smith guitars. They have designed an acoustic guitar pickup for the Fender Musical Instruments Corporation. ESP Guitars sells guitars incorporating Fishman Fluence pickups. Gibson installs Fishman pickups in its G-45 Series acoustic guitars. In 2019 Ibanez Guitars began selling a guitar model with Fishman pickups. Reverend Guitars, Schecter guitars and Solar Guitars sell guitars with Fishman Fluence pickups, and Caparison has begun installing Fishman pickups in their Dellinger basses. Also recently, Cort Guitars have launched the KX500 model which comes loaded with Fishman Fluence pickups, making Cort guitars a new staple on modern guitar players.

=== Products ===
- Guitar pickup system (pickup + preamp + cable + endpin output including USB port)
- Pickups
  - Acoustic guitar soundhole pickup
- Guitar bridge
- ToneDEQ Preamp
- Effects pedals
- Acoustic guitar amplifiers
- Performance audio systems

== See also ==
- Acoustic guitar
- Busking
- Humbucker
- Single coil guitar pickup
