= The End of Heartache =

Studio album by Killswitch Engage
- Released: May 11, 2004
- Recorded: Late 2003 - February 2004
- Studio: Zing Studios Westfield, Massachusetts
- Genre: Melodic metalcore
- Length: 42:36
- Label: Roadrunner
- Producer: Adam Dutkiewicz

Killswitch Engage chronology
Alive or Just Breathing (2002)	The End of Heartache (2004)	As Daylight Dies (2006)

Alternative cover
- Special edition cover

Singles from The End of Heartache
- 1. "Rose of Sharyn" Released: May 2004; 2. "The End of Heartache" Released: August 2004; 3. "A Bid Farewell" Released: November 2005

The End of Heartache is the third studio album by the American metalcore band Killswitch Engage. It was released on May 11, 2004, through Roadrunner Records. It is the first album to feature lead vocalist Howard Jones and drummer Justin Foley.

Three single were released for the album "The End of Heartache", "Rose of Sharyn" and "A Bid Farewell." The album was the band’s first to reach the Billboard 200, selling 38,000 copies in its first week of release peaking at number 21. A special edition of the album was released in 2005 that contained six additional tracks

The album combines melodic elements with screamo, progressive metal, thrash metal and extreme metal to create "the perfect" melodic metalcore work, according to MetalSucks.

Upon release It received positive reviews from critics, and helped boost the band’s mainstream appeal. The End of Heartache won album of the year at the 2004 Metal Hammer Golden Gods Awards. The title track was also nominated for Best Metal Performance at the 47th Annual Grammy Awards. It has since been ranked among the best metalcore / metal albums by publications such as Loudwire and Metal Hammer.

== Background ==
In 2002 Killswitch Engage released their second album Alive or Just Breathing. However missing his wife whom he had married two weeks prior to the tour, the bands original singer Jesse Leach left Killswitch Engage in the middle of their first national tour. Killswitch Engage very quickly set up auditions to fill the vocalist position in the band and eventually settled on Howard Jones, who was at the time the frontman of Blood Has Been Shed. Jones very quickly had to learn a set of songs to tour with the band. The End of Heartache marked a major turning point in the bands career, as it was the bands first album to not feature Leach, Jones had fronted the band as their lead vocalist for two years at this point but the album marked his recording debut with the group. The album also marked the debut of drummer Justin Foley who was bandmates with Jones in Blood Has Been Shed. Jones brought Foley into the band after Tom Gomes left in October 2003.

In an interview with Kerrang guitarist and producer Adam Dutkiewicz commented on this time period stating:

It was a strange time to us, because it was Howard’s first record, so I felt like we needed to have something to prove on here, Just before, we had Alive Or Just Breathing, which was the record where people started noticing us and who we were, and we started growing as a band. Then, all of the sudden, we had a new singer, which is a very weird thing. So as I was producing it, I was thinking about how it needs to be better than what we just did, that it needs to be the next big thing, and not a step back.

== Composition ==
The album was produced by the band’s guitarist Adam Dutkiewicz, who played a key part in shaping their sound. Killswitch Engage officially began writing for the album in late 2003 early 2004 following the Headbangers Ball tour with Lamb of God and Shadows fall. Unlike their previous effort Dutkiewicz attempted to be more planned out during the recording process resulting in the band doing a lot of pre production. One song was recorded with a different amplifier due to the previous one blowing up in studio.

With this album the band aimed to refine their blend of aggressive metalcore with more melodic and accessible songwriting, which helped them break through to a wider audience. With Howard Jones’ mix of harsh screams and powerful clean singing expanded the band’s sonic range. Dutkiewicz pushed the band to be perfectionist, in a 2018 interview Joel Stroetzel stated "The End of Heartache was a whole different thing. We’d double every guitar, and everything had to be perfectly in tune." in a separate interview he added "he came down pretty hard on all of us, I had a couple of nights when we kept having to do a part over and over again and I was just like, What are you talking about that take was awesome."

Jones’ lyrical approach introduced a more introspective and emotionally resonant tone than previous records, which helped broaden the band’s appeal and emotional range. former singer Jesse Leach provided additional vocals on the songs "Take This Oath" and "Irreversal". Jones admitted that he was extremely nervous while making the album and the comparisons that would be made between him and Leach. Throughout the writing process Jones initially had trouble coming up with lyrics, however Dutkiewicz noted that any melody or arrangement idea he gave him Jones would fit it perfectly.

During the recording process many of members of the band went through burn out, Dutkiewicz worked on the album every day for a three month period only taking Christmas Day off. He stated the process "was just hell" similarly Jones noted that he had spent more time in the studio working on the album than he had with all of previous bands combined. By February 2004 the band had finished up recording at Zing Studios in Westfield, Massachusetts and the album began being mixed in the U.K. by Andy Sneap.

The album cover was created by bassist Mike D’Antonio.

== Release and promotion ==
The End of Heartache was released on May 11, 2004, and peaked at number 21 on the Billboard 200, selling 38,000 copies in its first week of release.

Two music videos: "Rose of Sharyn" and "The End of Heartache" were filmed in promotion of the album. "Rose of Sharyn" had the group performing in a sunny desert with blood dripping from dead branches to form words. "The End of Heartache" featured a darkly lit performance with various animated imagery with scenes from Resident Evil: Apocalypse dotted throughout. Both videos saw notable airplay on Headbangers Ball. The band previously played on the 2003 MTV2 Headbangers Ball Tour. "The End of Heartache" became the band’s first song to reach the US Mainstream Rock chart peaking at number 31.

"When Darkness Falls" appeared on the soundtrack to the 2003 horror film Freddy vs. Jason. The album debuted in the top 40 on the Australian album charts on May 17, 2004, following a successful tour of that country with Anthrax. Killswitch Engage toured extensively in support of the album, including an August-September North American tour with Eighteen Visions and From Autumn To Ashes. They also took part in the Fall Jägermeister Tour alongside Slayer and Mastodon, along with Ozzfest 2005. On April 21, 2005, Killswitch Engage performed the albums title track on Jimmy Kimmel Live.

A special edition of the album featuring new cover art was released in 2005 that contained six additional tracks and a second disc featuring various live performances, a Japanese bonus track, and a re-recorded version of "Irreversal".

The album was certified Gold by the RIAA on November 7, 2007. Killswitch Engage was presented the Gold Plaques at the Roadrunner Records US office in New York City.

In November in 2021, Killswitch Engage reissued the album on vinyl with bonus tracks, redesigned art, and a custom etching on side D by bassist Mike D’Antonio, it was released via Run Out Groove.

== Reception ==
Professional ratings
Review scores
Source	Rating
AllMusic	4/5 stars
Collector's Guide to Heavy Metal	7/10
Rolling Stone	3.5/5 stars
Rock Hard	8.5/10
Spin	A−
Ultimate Guitar	10/10 stars
Blabbermouth.net	9.2/10 stars
Metal.de	9/10

The album received positive reviews from music critics. Lani L writing for Tuonela Magazine stated, "The End of Heartache" is an essential album to listen to regardless of whether or not you actually like metalcore per se. I would even go so far as to claim that, especially, if you dislike the genre – or what it has become over the years – you really should listen to this album." Blabbermouth.net wrote "The End Of Heartache" features ten songs and two brief instrumentals, and its relatively short (under 43 minutes) length and wall-to-wall sequencing (all the songs bleed into each other) ensure that the music doesn't get stale and the listener only gets a breath when the band permits.” Finishing with, "It may be the end of heartache, but Killswitch Engage shows that metal is not just breathing, but indisputably alive." Eduardo Rivadavia of AllMusic praised Howard Jones for talking over Jesse Leach's spot stating, "Jones effortlessly matches his predecessor's talent for both clean singing and hardcore-style screaming." Ultimate Guitar stated, "This album definitely stands up to KsE's past works but builds on every aspect and is a sure improvement."

Jonathan of Inside Pulse added, "The End of Heartache" is the perfect example of a "can’t stop" release: one you start listening and get involved in the music, there never seems a good point to turn it off. Each song bleeds well into the next. The album, as a whole, is super-tight." Metal.de claimed "Use "The End Of Heartache" as a template. This album is simply a killer, with which this band has definitively established itself at the forefront of modern metal acts. While its predecessor, "Alive Or Just Breathing," was already rightly showered with praise everywhere, these twelve tracks take it to another level."

The album won Best Album at the 2004 Metal Hammer Golden Gods Awards. The title track was nominated for Best Metal Performance at the 47th Annual Grammy Awards.

In a 2022 poll held by Revolver Magazine the lead single "Rose of Sharyn" was voted the greatest metalcore song of all time. The publication added "Everything about this song is a masterclass in metalcore craftsmanship — the chunky production, the quality of that lead riff, the way Jones’ mighty belt contrasts with Adam Dutkiewicz’s croons. It’s just perfect."

=== Accolades ===
Publication	Country	Accolade	Year	Rank
Rock Hard	DE	The 500 Greatest Rock & Metal Albums of All Time	2005	401
Decibel	US	The Top 100 Greatest Metal Albums of the Decade	2010	86
Loudwire	US	The 10 Best Metal Albums of 2004	2014	3
Metal Hammer	UK	100 Greatest Metal Albums of the 21st century	2018	7
Loudwire	US	25 Best Metalcore Albums of All Time	2020	12
Ultimate Guitar	US	Top 20 Best Metalcore Albums of All Time	2020	2
Loudwire	US	The 100 Best Rock + Metal Albums of the 21st Century	2023	46
Metal Hammer	UK	The 50 Best Metal Albums of the 2000s	2023	11
Loudwire	US	Best Metalcore Album From Every Year Since 2000	2024	2004
Loudwire	US	The 50 Best Metal Albums of the 2000s	2025	NR
Yardbarker	US	The 20 Greatest Heavy Metal Albums of the 21st Century So Far	2025	NR

== Legacy ==
The End of Heartache is credited with boosting Killswitch Engage in popularity, making them a household name. In a 2019 interview with Kerrang, Adam Dutkiewicz talked about the rise in popularity the band seen following the album’s release "The moment we were told that we were going to be featured in one of the Resident Evil movies, I realized that people were paying attention to us. "We grew as musicians and band members, and having Howard was such an amazing thing because his pipes are amazing. It was a whole new world that opened up so many possibilities and potentials, so I think we did step it up. It was a good time for us."

Jesse Leach has spotlighted The End of Heartache as the turning point for the band’s global impact. It has also been credited with "kicking metalcore to the next level" as it showed the genre could be anthemic, emotional, and heavy, all at once. Martin of Lolipop Magazine wrote that the album "vaulted Killswitch Engage past Shadows Fall, God Forbid, Darkest Hour, Lamb of God and Unearth, to be considered the best, or at least most indicative brightest hope, for metalcore."

In 2020, John Hill of Loudwire included the album in his list of the "Top 25 Metalcore Albums of All Time." In 2022, Revolver said the album was a "genre pillar" and that the track "Rose of Sharyn" was "a masterclass in metalcore craftsmanship."

It was cited as the band's best album by Bryan Rolli of Loudwire in 2025.

== Track listing ==
All lyrics are written by Howard Jones; all music is composed by Killswitch Engage.

No.	Title	Length
1.	"A Bid Farewell"	3:55
2.	"Take This Oath" (featuring Jesse Leach)	3:46
3.	"When Darkness Falls"	3:52
4.	"Rose of Sharyn"	3:36
5.	"Inhale" (instrumental)	1:15
6.	"Breathe Life"	3:18
7.	"The End of Heartache"	4:58
8.	"Declaration"	3:01
9.	"World Ablaze"	5:00
10.	"And Embers Rise" (instrumental)	1:11
11.	"Wasted Sacrifice"	4:18
12.	"Hope Is..." (featuring Phil Labonte)	4:21
Total length:		42:36

Special edition bonus tracks
No.	Title	Length
13.	"Irreversal" (featuring Jesse Leach & Phil Labonte, Re-Recorded Version)	3:49
14.	"My Life for Yours"	3:34
15.	"The End of Heartache" (Resident Evil: Apocalypse Version)	4:05
16.	"Life to Lifeless" (Live)	3:22
17.	"Fixation on the Darkness" (Live)	3:40
18.	"My Last Serenade" (Live)	4:00
Total length:		65:06

== Personnel ==
Killswitch Engage

- Howard Jones – lead vocals
- Adam Dutkiewicz – lead guitar, backing vocals
- Joel Stroetzel – rhythm guitar, backing vocals
- Mike D'Antonio – bass
- Justin Foley – drums, percussion

Guest musicians

- Jesse Leach – additional vocals ("Take This Oath" and "Irreversal")
- Phil Labonte – additional vocals ("Hope Is..." and "Irreversal")
- Andy Sneap – additional guitar ("The End of Heartache")

Production

- Mike D'Antonio – design, artwork photography, layout
- Adam Dutkiewicz – production, engineering
- Chris Fortin – assistant engineering
- Wayne Krupa – assistant engineering
- Andy Sneap – mixing, mastering

== Song appearances ==
- "A Bid Farewell (Live)" is featured on Disc #1 of the compilation MTV2 Headbangers Ball: The Revenge
- The original recording of "When Darkness Falls" is featured on the film soundtrack Freddy vs. Jason
- "The End of Heartache (Resident Evil Version)" is featured on the film soundtrack Resident Evil: Apocalypse; also as the theme song of professional wrestler Roderick Strong and Tyler Black
- "Rose of Sharyn" is also featured on Disc 1 of the compilation MTV2 Headbangers Ball, Vol. 2
- "The End of Heartache" is a playable song in Guitar Hero: Van Halen, Rock Revolution and Rock Band 3 as DLC with an optional Pro Guitar/Bass download.
- "The End of Heartache" was featured daily as the closing theme song on "Morency" on Hardcore Sports Radio Sirius Satellite Channel 98 from the summer to late fall of 2009; at which time the show was dropped.

== Chart positions ==
Album

Chart (2004)	Peak position
Australian Albums (ARIA)	39
French Albums (SNEP)	177
German Albums (Offizielle Top 100)	42
Scottish Albums (OCC)	35
UK Albums (OCC)	40
UK Rock & Metal Albums (OCC)	2
UK Physical Albums (OCC)	40
US Billboard 200 (Billboard)	21
US Top Album Sales (Billboard)	21

Chart (2005)	Peak position
UK Rock & Metal Albums (OCC)	1

Chart (2009)	Peak position
Scottish Albums (OCC)	29
UK Album Downloads (OCC)	29
UK Physical Albums (OCC)	32

Singles

Year	Single	Chart	Peak position
2004	"The End of Heartache"	Mainstream Rock	31

== Certifications ==
Region	Certification	Certified units/sales
United Kingdom (BPI)	Silver	60,000^{^}
United States (RIAA)	Gold	500,000^{^}
^{^} Shipments figures based on certification alone.

== Additional information ==
- Mixed and mastered at Backstage Productions, Ripley, Derbyshire, UK, from January 2004 to February 2004.
