= Unearth discography =

American metalcore band discography

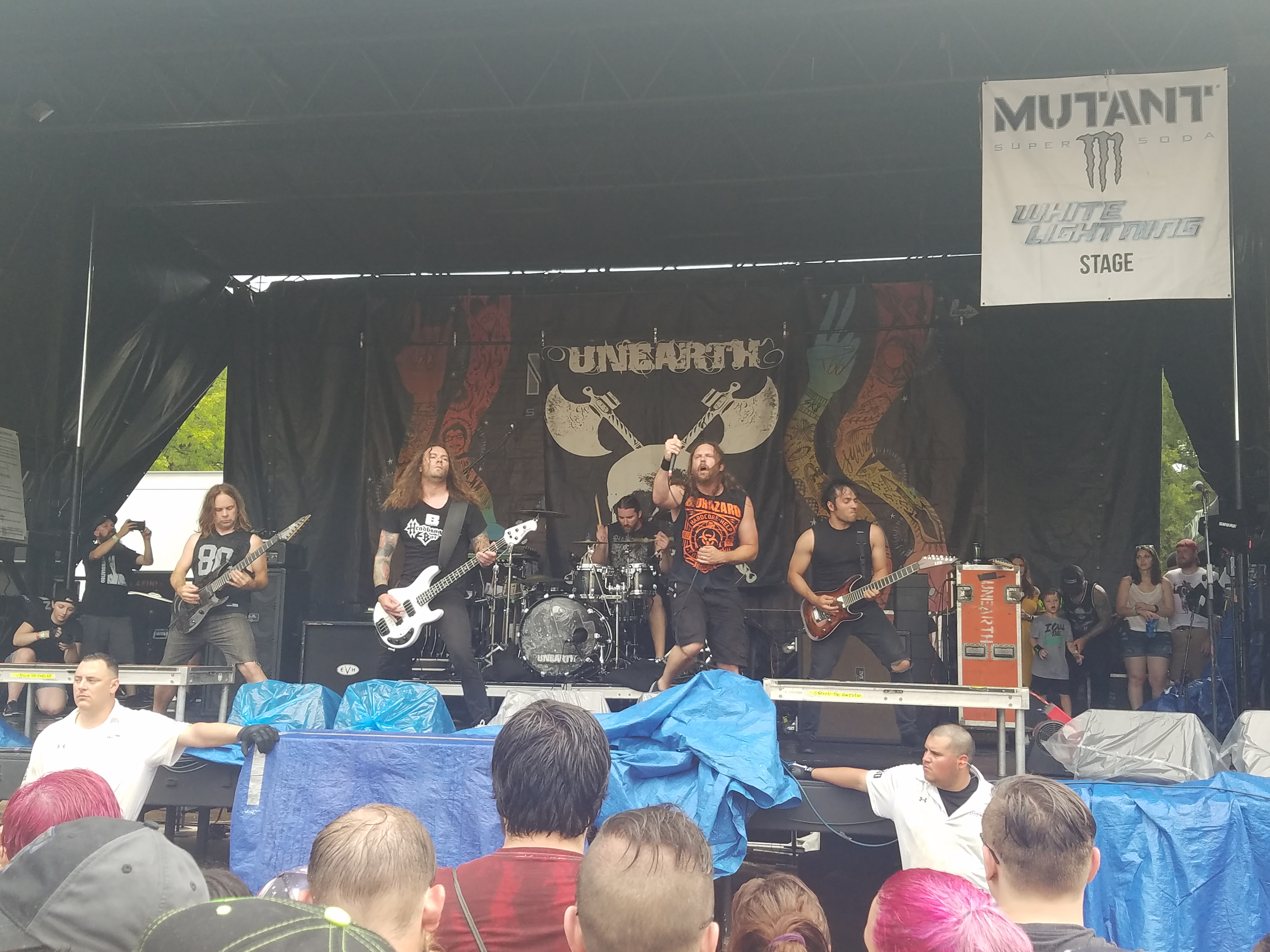
- Unearth in 2018
- Studio albums: 8
- Extended plays: 3
- Compilation albums: 1
- Video albums: 1
- Music videos: 11

The following is a comprehensive discography of Unearth, an American metalcore band who have sold over 500,000 albums worldwide. They have released eight studio albums and three EPs to date. The group was formed in 1998, and following their debut EP, Above the Fall of Man, which was released in 1999 they signed with to Eulogy Recordings to release their debut album, The Stings of Conscience, in 2001. They then signed with Metal Blade Records to release their second studio album, The Oncoming Storm, which debuted at number 105 on the Billboard 200.

In 2006 they released III: In the Eyes of Fire, which became their highest-charting album on the Billboard 200 peaking at number 35, it debuted at number 2 on the U.S. Independent Charts. In March 2008 they released a Video album titled Alive from the Apocalypse. Later that same year they followed this up with their 4th studio album, The March, which debuted at number 45 on the Billboard 200. The band's 5th album, Darkness in the Light, was released in 2011 and debuted at number 72 on the Billboard 200.

They then signed with eOne Music to release their 6th studio album, Watchers of Rule, which debuted at 105 on the Billboard 200. They then signed with Century Media to release Extinction(s) in 2018. Their most recent album, The Wretched; the Ruinous, was released in 2023.

== Albums ==
=== Studio albums ===
List of studio albums, with selected chart positions
Title	Album details	Peak chart positions							
Title	Album details	US	US Indie	US Rock	US Hard Rock	GER	JPN	SUI	UK Indie
The Stings of Conscience	Released: January 16, 2001; Label: Eulogy; Formats: CD, digital download	—	—	—	—	—	—	—	—
The Oncoming Storm	Released: June 29, 2004; Label: Metal Blade; Formats: CD, LP, digital download	105	6	—	—	—	—	—	—
III: In the Eyes of Fire	Released: August 8, 2006; Label: Metal Blade; Formats: CD, digital download	35	2	12	—	86	120	—	9
The March	Released: October 14, 2008; Label: Metal Blade; Formats: CD, LP, digital download	45	3	16	4	—	106	—	31
Darkness in the Light	Released: July 5, 2011; Label: Metal Blade; Formats: CD, digital download	72	14	21	7	99	—	—	50
Watchers of Rule	Released: October 28, 2014; Label: eOne Music; Formats: CD, LP, digital download	105	25	22	9	—	117	—	—
Extinction(s)	Released: November 23, 2018; Label: Century Media; Formats: CD, LP, digital download	—	—	—	—	—	—	—	—
The Wretched; the Ruinous	Released: May 5, 2023; Label: Century Media; Formats: CD, LP, digital download	—	—	—	—	—	—	94	—
"—" denotes a recording that did not chart or was not released in that territory.

=== Compilations ===
Title	Details
Our Days of Eulogy	Released: November 15, 2005; Label: Eulogy; Formats: CD, digital download

=== Video albums ===
Title	Details	Certification
Alive from the Apocalypse	Released: March 28, 2008; Label: Metal Blade; Formats: DVD	MC: Gold

== EPs ==
List of EPs
Title	Details
Above the Fall of Man	Released: May 12, 1999; Label: Endless Fight; Formats: CD, digital download
Endless	Released: September 17, 2002; Label: Eulogy; Formats: CD, digital download
Bask in the Blood of Our Demons	Released: July 12, 2024; Label: N/A; Formats: Digital download

== Music videos ==
Title	From the album
"One Step Away"	The Stings of Conscience
"Black Hearts Now Reign"	The Oncoming Storm
"The Great Dividers"	The Oncoming Storm
"Zombie Autopilot"	The Oncoming Storm
"Endless"	The Oncoming Storm
"Giles"	III: In the Eyes of Fire
"Sanctity of Brothers"	III: In the Eyes of Fire
"This Glorious Nightmare"	III: In the Eyes of Fire
"March of the Mutes"	Alive from the Apocalypse
"My Will Be Done"	The March
"Grave of Opportunity"	The March
"Crow Killer"	The March
"Watch It Burn"	Darkness in the Light
"The Swarm"	Watchers of Rule
"Never Cease"	Watchers of Rule
"One with the Sun"	Extinction(s)
"No Reprisal"	Extinction(s)
"Incinerate"	Extinction(s)
"Sidewinder"	Extinction(s)

== Other ==
- 2025 - Trevor guest vocals on Swim North by Paradise Slaves
- 2007 – Our Impact Will Be Felt
  - Contribution: "Clobberin Time"/"What's Going On"
- 2007 – The Best of Taste of Chaos Two.
  - Contribution: "Giles"
- 2007 – Aqua Teen Hunger Force Colon Movie Film for Theaters Colon the Soundtrack
  - Contribution: "The Chosen"
- 2006 – Revolver Presents: Future Is Metal
- 2005 – Taste of Chaos
  - Contribution: "This Lying World" and "Black Hearts Now Reign" (from The Oncoming Storm)
- 2004 – Bring You to Your Knees: A Tribute To Guns N' Roses Compilation
  - Contribution: "It's So Easy"
- 2004 – MTV2 Headbangers Ball, Vol. 2
  - Contribution: "The Great Dividers" (from The Oncoming Storm)
- 2004 – AMP Magazine Presents: Volume 1: Hardcore
- 2004 – AMP Magazine Presents: Volume 3: Metal
- 2003 – MTV2 Headbangers Ball
  - Contribution: "Endless" (from Endless)
- 2000 – Sweet Deal!: Initial & Eulogy Sampler
