= Our Days of Eulogy =

Compilation album by Unearth
- Released: November 15, 2005
- Recorded: 1998 – January 2004
- Genre: Metalcore
- Length: 51:58
- Label: Eulogy Recordings
- Producers: Adam Dutkiewicz, Josh Baker, Ken Cmar

Unearth chronology
The Oncoming Storm (2004)	Our Days of Eulogy (2005)	III: In the Eyes of Fire (2006)

Professional ratings
Review scores
Source	Rating
AllMusic	3.5/5 stars
Punknews.org	3/5 stars

Our Days of Eulogy is the first compilation album by American metalcore band Unearth. The first half of the CD contains live recordings while the second half is a collection of songs from their EPs Above the Fall of Man and Endless.

== Background ==
In late September of 2005, Our Days of Eulogy was announced. The compilation would contain five live tracks, in addition to the Endless EP, and the out-of-print debut EP Above the Fall of Man. A release date of November 15 was expected. Prior to its release, clips were made available for streaming on the MTV.com website.

The albums tracks were recording at several different locations, including: Alliance Studios and Prophet Sound, both in Boston, MA, as well as The Downtown in Farmindale, Long Island, NY, and Zing Studios in Westfield, MA.

The album marked the bands final release on Eulogy Records, Eulogy included a bonus disc on the album sampling their most promising acts at the time such as Evergreen Terrace and On Broken Wings.

== Track listing ==
Track list adopted from AllMusic.

Disc 1
No.	Title	Length
1.	"My Heart Bleeds No Longer (live)"	4:41
2.	"Fuel the Fire (live)"	3:52
3.	"Internal War (live)"	3:42
4.	"Only the People (live)"	3:38
5.	"One Step Away (live)"	3:59
6.	"Endless"	3:16
7.	"Internal War"	3:43
8.	"The Charm"	3:09
9.	"My Desire"	4:51
10.	"Shattered by the Sun"	3:50
11.	"Call to Judgement"	3:34
12.	"Convictions"	4:23
13.	"Lefty"	5:19
Total length:		1:15:53

(note: On the CD itself as well on the back cover of the cd case, the live versions of "Internal War" and "Only the People" are reversed due to a manufacturing glitch)

Eulogy Recordings took advantage of their final Unearth release to include a bonus disc sampling their most promising acts:

Disc 2
No.	Title	Writer(s)	Length
1.	"Dogfight"	Evergreen Terrace	3:16
2.	"More Than Life"	On Broken Wings	2:58
3.	"The King is Dead"	Hoods	2:12
4.	"They Live"	Calico System	3:13
5.	"Devil in Disguise"	Shattered Realm	1:48
6.	"Gator Smash"	Kids Like Us	3:07
7.	"We Weren't Brought Up Right"	Black My Heart	3:23
8.	"Know This X"	Casey Jones	1:43
9.	"Set the Stage"	Warriors	2:16
