= The Messenger (Casey Jones album) =

Studio album by Casey Jones
- Released: 2006
- Genre: Hardcore punk
- Length: 27:01
- Label: Eulogy Recordings

Casey Jones chronology
The Few, The Proud, The Crucial (2003)	The Messenger (2006)	I Hope We're Not The Last (2011)

Professional ratings
Review scores
Source	Rating
HCS	3/5 stars

The Messenger is Casey Jones's second album release. It was released in on June 6, 2006, by Eulogy Recordings.

== Track listing ==
1. "1 Out of 3 Has a STD" - 1:54
2. "Coke Bongs and Sing-A-Longs" - 2:07
3. "No Donnie, These Men Are Straight Edge" - 2:02
4. "Lessons" - 2:35
5. "Nothing to Lose" – 4:35
6. "Any Port in the Storm" – 2:23
7. "The Sober" – 2:08
8. "Medic" – 2:02
9. "Bite the Dust" – 1:54
10. "Times Up" – 1:24
11. "Punch-A-Size" – 3:05
12. "Shitstorm" – 2:35

"No Donnie, These Men are Straight Edge" is a play on the Evergreen Terrace song "No Donnie, These Men are Nihilist" from their album Burned Alive by Time.
