= XOne FifthX vs. Evergreen Terrace =

EP (Split) by XOne FifthX and Evergreen Terrace
- Released: May 20, 2003
- Recorded: October–December 2001
- Genre: Melodic hardcore; hardcore punk; metalcore
- Length: 23:24
- Label: Indianola
- Producer: Evergreen Terrace; Lee Dyess

XOne FifthX chronology
XOne FifthX vs. Evergreen Terrace (2003)

Evergreen Terrace chronology
Burned Alive by Time (2002)	Xone FifthX vs. Evergreen Terrace (2003)	Writer's Block (2004)

XOne FifthX vs. Evergreen Terrace is a split EP by American metalcore bands XOne FifthX and Evergreen Terrace. The album was released on May 20, 2003, through Indianola Records.

== Track listing ==
No.	Title	Length
1.	"Blue Eyes, Black Heart"	3:28
2.	"Burned Alive by Time"	2:46
3.	"Cut Down to Oblivion"	3:18
4.	"Bitter Ending"	2:31
5.	"xHey Tallahassee I Think You Dropped Somethingx"	1:09
6.	"Can Adam See Your Boobies?"	2:59
7.	"Four Door Killer"	2:00
8.	"Put Another Quarter in the Jukebox Baby"	2:19
9.	"The Shit Hit the Fan" (Ice-T cover)	3:03
Total length:		23:24

- Tracks 1–4 are by Evergreen Terrace; tracks 5–9 are by xOne Fifthx.

== Personnel ==
Evergreen Terrace

- Andrew Carey – unclean vocals
- Craig Chaney – guitar, clean vocals
- Josh James – guitar, backing vocals
- Jason Southwell – bass
- Christopher Brown – drums
