= Sanctity of Brothers =

"Sanctity Of Brothers"

Song by Unearth

from the album III: In the Eyes of Fire
- Released: August 8, 2006
- Recorded: Studio X, Seattle, Washington
- Genre: Metalcore
- Length: 3:28
- Label: Metal Blade Records
- Songwriter(s): Mike Justian, John Maggard, Paul McGrath, Trevor Phipps, Ken Susi
- Producer(s): Terry Date; Unearth

"Sanctity of Brothers" is the fourth track on the 2006 Unearth album, III: In the Eyes of Fire. The music video to this song is part one to three parts of a story.

== Info ==
Here is what Trevor Phipps, the lead singer, had to say about the video:

We had just begun to schedule the shooting of our second video, 'Sanctity of Brothers' with famed director Darren Doane, when he decided to retire to pursue other professional goals. Fortunately, he had written a pretty sick video treatment and told us we could use it if the director was new, talented and had never directed a music video before. So we took to searching the internet for some new talent and came across a guy from Prague named ‘Soren’. Soren’s images were dark and well thought out, so we got in touch with him. We showed him the treatment Darren had written and he agreed to go with it, but he wanted to put his own flavor and twists into the video. This guy is crazy, he had a 10 day shooting schedule spanning 3 countries; he used a helicopter and some cool animation. It will have the same high energy as our video for ‘Giles’, but will have an in depth story line and will be our first video with special effects. The video will be more like a short film with three parts. The first and third sections will be the intro and ending, while the second chapter will be the actual song. Soren is on to some groundbreaking shit here and we are stoked to be part of it.

— Trevor Phipps

== Personnel ==
- Trevor Phipps : vocals
- Buz McGrath : Guitar
- Ken Susi : Guitar
- John Maggard : Bass
- Mike Justian : drums
