= Dead Horses =

Studio album by Evergreen Terrace
- Released: December 10, 2013
- Recorded: June 2013
- Studio: Martell Studios
- Genres: Melodic hardcore; metalcore
- Length: 34:40
- Label: Rise
- Producers: Craig Chaney; Stan Martell

Evergreen Terrace chronology
Almost Home (2009)	Dead Horses (2013)

Professional ratings
Review scores
Source	Rating
Bring the Noise UK	7/10
New Noise	Recommended

Dead Horses is the sixth full-length album by the band Evergreen Terrace. It was released through Rise Records on December 10, 2013, the band's first release through the label.

It is the first album not featuring guitarist Josh James, who was replaced by Alex Varian. It is also the band's first album with bassist Jason Southwell since 2007's Wolfbiker.

== Background and release ==
The album was recorded in the summer of 2013.

The first song released from the album was the title track on October 22. The song "When You're Born in the Gutter, You End Up in the Port" was released on November 19. The entire album was available for streaming on Rise's official YouTube channel on December 7.

== Track listing ==
No.	Title	Length
1.	"Crows"	3:07
2.	"When You're Born in the Gutter, You End Up in the Port"	2:53
3.	"Post Satanic Ritual Baby"	3:53
4.	"Dead Horses"	4:20
5.	"Browbeaters Anonymous"	4:17
6.	"It's All Over But the Cryin'"	2:52
7.	"Lacuna Inc."	3:22
8.	"Mike Myers Never Runs, But He Always Catches Up"	2:13
9.	"The Fortunate Ones"	4:15
10.	"That Dog'll Hunt"	3:28
Total length:		34:40

== Credits ==
Evergreen Terrace

- Andrew Carey - vocals
- Craig Chaney - guitar, vocals
- Jason Southwell - bass
- Brad Moxey - drums
- Alex Varian - guitar

Production

- Produced by Craig Chaney & Stan Martell
- Recorded, Mixed, Mastered & additional instrumentation by Stan Martell
