= Darkness in the Light =

Darkness in the Light may refer to:

- Darkness in the Light (album), a 2011 album by Unearth
- Darkness in the Light (film), a 2001 Japanese drama film
