= Losing All Hope Is Freedom =

Studio album by Evergreen Terrace
- Released: July 31, 2001
- Recorded: February – March 2001
- Genres: Melodic hardcore; metalcore
- Length: 32:14
- Label: Indianola
- Producer: Evergreen Terrace

Evergreen Terrace chronology
Evergreen Terrace (2000)	Losing All Hope Is Freedom (2001)	Burned Alive by Time (2002)

Professional ratings
Review scores
Source	Rating
Allmusic	4/5 stars

Losing All Hope Is Freedom is the debut album released by the melodic hardcore band Evergreen Terrace. The title is drawn from the novel Fight Club by Chuck Palahniuk.

== Track listing ==
All music and lyrics by Evergreen Terrace, except where noted.

No.	Title	Writer(s)	Length
1.	"Sweet Nothings Gone Forever"		3:22
2.	"Tevis Sux"		1:57
3.	"Failure of a Friend"		2:19
4.	"Embrace"		3:58
5.	"Manifestation of Anger"		3:08
6.	"What Would Jesus Do With a Weapon"		2:19
7.	"In My Dreams I Can Fly"		3:32
8.	"Behind My Back"		2:14
9.	"This Wonderful Hatred"		3:22
10.	"Look Up at the Stars and You're Gone"		2:39
11.	"Sunday Bloody Sunday" (U2 cover)	Bono, Adam Clayton, The Edge, Larry Mullen, Jr.	3:24
Total length:			32:14

== Personnel ==
- Andrew Carey – lead vocals
- Craig Chaney – lead guitar, clean vocals
- Josh James – rhythm guitar, backing vocals
- Jason Southwell – bass guitar
- Christopher Brown – drums
- Dave Quiggle – Artwork

== Cultural references ==
The band is known for referring to pop culture in their titles, lyrics, and soundbites.

Title	Reference
Losing All Hope is Freedom	Fight Club by Chuck Palahniuk
01. Sweet Nothings Gone Forever	sample from The Matrix
02. Tevis Sux	-
03. Failure of a Friend	-
04. Embrace	-
05. Manifestation of Anger	-
06. What Would Jesus Do with a Weapon	WWJD
07. In My Dreams I Can Fly	sample from Fight Club
08. Behind My Back	-
09. This Wonderful Hatred	-
10. Look Up at the Stars and You're Gone	Fight Club by Chuck Palahniuk
