= The Wretched; the Ruinous =

Studio album by Unearth
- Released: May 5, 2023
- Genre: Metalcore
- Length: 36:55
- Label: Century Media
- Producer: Will Putney

Unearth chronology
Extinction(s) (2018)	The Wretched; the Ruinous (2023)

Singles from The Wretched; the Ruinous
- 1. "The Wretched; the Ruinous" Released: January 24, 2023; 2. "Mother Betrayal" Released: March 3, 2023; 3. "Into the Abyss" Released: April 4, 2023

The Wretched; the Ruinous is the eighth studio album by American metalcore band Unearth. The album was released on May 5, 2023, through Century Media Records and was produced by Will Putney. It is the first Unearth album to feature drummer Mike Justian since the band's third effort, III: In the Eyes of Fire (2006), after which he left the band and rejoined in 2022.

== Background and promotion ==
This is the band's first album not to feature founding guitarist Ken Susi as he departed due to personal differences. This led to touring guitarist Peter Layman taking his place along with drummer Mike Justian joining for the new album.

On January 24, 2023, Unearth released the title track "The Wretched; The Ruinous" along with its music video. A day later, they published the music video for the title track. On March 3, the band unveiled "Mother Betrayal" and its corresponding music video. At the same time, the band announced the album itself and release date, whilst also revealing the album cover and the track list.

On April 4, one month before the album release, the band premiered the third and final single "Into the Abyss" along with a music video. The music video for "Dawn of the Militant" was released May 5, 2023, coinciding with the album release.

The band's frontman Trevor Phipps said in an interview “I’ve touched on environmental crisis on every record, going all the way back to the first one (2001’s The Stings of Conscience),” “The Wretched; the Ruinous is the first record entirely devoted to it.”

A four song EP titled Bask In The Blood Of Our Demons was released as a companion piece to the album in 2024. It contained two cut songs from the album titled "Sea of the Lost" and "Warriors Soul" along with two live versions of the albums title track and "Dawn of the Militant".

== Critical reception ==
Professional ratings
Review scores
Source	Rating
Blabbermouth.net	8/10
Distorted Sound	7/10
Ghost Cult	9/10
Metal Injection	7.5/10
Rock 'N' Load	9/10
New Noise Magazine	4.5/5 stars
Kerrang!	4/5

The album received generally positive reviews from critics. Dom Lawson from Blabbermouth.net gave the album 8 out of 10 and said: "Worthy of respect for staying the course, but also for smashing harder than ever, Unearth have made their best album since 2008's The March. In the absence of anyone else nailing this substrain of metal with such panache, I hereby proclaim them to be the current kings of this shit." Will Marshall of Distorted Sound scored the album 7 out of 10 and said: "Having declared they took the entire pandemic to write these songs as an exploration of what Unearth has been and is now (virtually the same, let's be honest), The Wretched; The Ruinous delivers everything you'd want from Unearth. It's fun, it's powerful, it'll be a blast to pit to and it's performed with a gusto and self-belief that comes from years of hard work and their deserved place as one of the originators of the scene. Any criticism of the band not changing their sound is moot at this point; they deliver exactly what's expected of them, and The Wretched; The Ruinous is another dependably solid slab of American metalcore from one of its earliest standard bearers." Ghost Cult gave the album a positive review, writing: "As interesting as it has been to see nu-metal make its return, I'm ready for the new wave to make another splash."

Metal Injection rated the album 7.5 out of 10 and stated, "This is a solid offering from one of the metalcore greats. I'm sure these songs will fit nicely with the band's repertoire and motivate the usual forceful (and often scary) reaction in the pit from their diehard fans." Rock 'N' Load praised the album, saying "The Wretched; The Ruinous feels like a very new & exciting chapter to Unearth's career. It's rare to see a band take chances to push themselves in the writing room & still create music that surprises long time fans. At the same time they still keep their core sound at heart. This is a fantastic album that hits hard where it needs to & experiments in the places that feel the best. An incredible album that places high in an already phenomenal discography!"

== Track listing ==
The Wretched; the Ruinous track listing
No.	Title	Length
1.	"The Wretched; the Ruinous"	4:20
2.	"Cremation of the Living"	3:19
3.	"Eradicator"	3:28
4.	"Mother Betrayal"	3:31
5.	"Invictus"	3:44
6.	"Call of Existence"	3:33
7.	"Dawn of the Militant"	2:56
8.	"Aniara"	0:57
9.	"Into the Abyss"	3:23
10.	"Broken Arrow"	2:50
11.	"Theaters of War"	4:49
Total length:		36:55

== Personnel ==
Unearth

- Trevor Phipps – lead vocals
- Buz McGrath – lead guitar
- Peter Layman – rhythm guitar, backing vocals
- Chris O'Toole – bass, backing vocals
- Mike Justian – drums

Additional personnel

- Will Putney – production, engineering, mixing, mastering
- Steve Seid – additional engineering
- Alexandre Goulet – artwork

== Charts ==
Chart performance for The Wretched; the Ruinous
Chart (2023)	Peak position
Australian Digital Albums (ARIA)	39
Swiss Albums (Schweizer Hitparade)	94
