= At Our Worst =

Compilation album by Evergreen Terrace
- Released: July 13, 2004
- Recorded: February 2000–April 2004
- Genres: Melodic hardcore; metalcore
- Length: 29:39
- Label: Hand of Hope

Evergreen Terrace chronology
| Burned Alive by Time (2002) | At Our Worst (2004) | Sincerity Is an Easy Disguise in This Business (2005) |

Professional ratings
Review scores
| Source | Rating |
|---|---|
| Allmusic | 3/5 stars |
| Punknews | 3/5 stars |

At Our Worst is a b-sides/live album released by American melodic hardcore band Evergreen Terrace.

== Background ==
In the CD, the band wrote that the label Indianola wanted to release their demos, though the band did not want to and only did so because they needed money. The unreleased track was originally written for Burned Alive By Time.

== Track listing ==
| No. | Title | Length |
|---|---|---|
| 1. | "Heavy #1" (live) | 2:45 |
| 2. | "Please Hammer Don't Hurt 'Em" (live) | 2:37 |
| 3. | "Zero" (live; The Smashing Pumpkins cover) | 2:39 |
| 4. | "In My Dreams I Can Fly" (live) | 3:33 |
| 5. | "No Donnie These Men Are Nihilists" (live) | 2:45 |
| 6. | "You're Entering a World of Pain (Burned Alive By Time)" (live) | 2:17 |
| 7. | "Shattered Remains" (demo) | 3:16 |
| 8. | "Let It Go" (demo) | 2:24 |
| 9. | "Behind My Back" (demo) | 2:22 |
| 10. | "Burnout" (demo) | 2:23 |
| 11. | "Untitled Track" (previously unreleased) | 2:38 |
| Total length: | | 29:39 |

- "No Donnie, These Men Are Nihilists" and "You're Entering a World of Pain" are quotes from the Coen Brothers film The Big Lebowski. Both are said by John Goodman.
- "You're Entering a World of Pain" is released as "Burned Alive by Time" on the album of the same name.

== Production ==
- Tracks 1–5 Recorded in Jacksonville, FL @ Jack Rabbits NOV. 2003 Engineered and Mixed by: Lee Dyess & Jason Southwell
- Track 6 Recorded @ Earthsound Studios JULY 2002 by: Lee Dyess and Vision Studios APRIL 2004 by:Daryl Phenniger
- Tracks 7–10 Recorded @ Hole Of The Pigeon Studios FEB. 2000 Engineered and Mixed by: Paul Lapinski
