= The Few, the Proud, the Crucial =

The Few, The Proud, The Crucial

Studio album by Casey Jones
- Released: January 27, 2004
- Genre: Hardcore punk, youth crew
- Length: 22:00
- Label: Indianola Records

Casey Jones chronology
The Few, The Proud, The Crucial (2004)	The Messenger (2006)

The Few, The Proud, The Crucial is Casey Jones's first full-length release. It was released in 2004 by Indianola Records. The album uses several sound clips from Family Guy episodes; most notably "Mr. Griffin Goes to Washington", an episode about cigarette companies.

== Track listing ==
1. "Just Another Day In The FLA – 1:46
2. "Know This X" – 1:42
3. "Grown Assman" – 1:49
4. "You Were Never A Fan Of The Dry Hump" – 1:37
5. "Strike Hard" – 1:58
6. "Dead Kid? Try A Nice Memorial Tattoo" – 1:51
7. "CGI 2K3" – 1:29
8. "Meaner Than A Junkyard Dog" – 1:24
9. "If You’re Smoking In Here, You Better Be On Fire" – 1:25
10. "Big Train, Raging Ice" – 1:28
11. "Pigs Is Pigs" – 2:01
12. "Pain 101" – 3:25 (contains hidden rap track)
