= Evergreen Terrace =

American metalcore band

- Origin: Jacksonville, Florida, U.S.
- Genres: Metalcore; melodic hardcore
- Years active: 1999–present
- Labels: Metal Blade; Mind Over Matter; Eulogy; Indianola; Rise; Hand of Hope
- Spinoffs: Casey Jones
- Members: Andrew Carey; Craig Chaney; Alex Varian; Jason Southwell; Brad Moxey
- Past members: Joshua Smith; Joshua Willis; Brad Moxey; Josh James; Kyle Mims; Caleb James; Chris Andrews; Christopher Brown; Kyle Smith; Longineu W. Parsons III

Evergreen Terrace is a five-piece American metalcore band from Jacksonville, Florida. Formed in 1999, they are named after the street inhabited by the Simpsons. The band's sixth and latest studio album Dead Horses was released on December 10, 2013, via Rise Records.

== History ==
=== Formation and early recordings ===
Formed in 1999 by Josh James (guitar), Andrew Carey (vocals), Josh "Woody" Willis (guitar), Josh Smith (bass) and Christopher Brown (drums), the band released one Demo-EP and a Split-EP together with Cordelle within the first year of being a band. Within 8 months of the beginning of the band Woody and Josh Smith were replaced by Craig Chaney (guitar/vocals) and Jason Southwell (bass). In 2001 their debut-album Losing All Hope Is Freedom was released via Indianola Records on July 31. Under the same label they released a Split-EP together with xOne Fifthx, on May 20, 2002, titled XOne FifthX vs. Evergreen Terrace. Shortly after the release of the split Josh James (guitar) joined xOne Fifthx and continued playing with Evergreen Terrace.

Later in 2002 they signed with Eulogy Recordings and released their second studio-album Burned Alive by Time on November 26. After a number of long tours they released a cover album titled Writer's Block in February 2004. The album includes songs from bands like U2, Smashing Pumpkins, and Tears for Fears. In July they released At Our Worst which contained live performances, as well as B-Sides from Burned Alive by Time and the 4 tracks from the self-released Demo-EP. At Our Worst was released on Hand of Hope Records, a label started by drummer Chris Brown and Eulogy owner John Wylie. 2004 was also the year the band started touring outside of USA and Canada.

In 2005 they released a live-DVD called Hotter! Wetter! Stickier! Funner! The same year they released their third studio-album entitled Sincerity Is an Easy Disguise in This Business on June 21. Shortly after, drummer Christopher Brown left the band and was replaced by Kyle Mims. The next few years were spent touring non-stop, worldwide. Including tours with As I Lay Dying, Rise Against, Hatebreed and more.

=== Metal Blade years ===
In February 2007 they signed under High Impact Recordings, a Metal Blade Records-sub label founded by As I Lay Dying vocalist Tim Lambesis. Later on July 24, their fourth album Wolfbiker was released. Evergreen Terrace toured with As I Lay Dying, August Burns Red, and Still Remains in early 2008. In addition to this tour, the band played every date of the 2008 Warped Tour.

In June 2008 the band released Blowing Chunks through Hand of Hope Records, which contained two unreleased songs from the Wolfbiker studio sessions. It is available on 7" vinyl and digital download only.

On September 25, 2009, they released their fifth album Almost Home, featuring guest vocals from Tim Lambesis on the track "God Rocky, Is This Your Face?". In December 2009, they went on their Almost Homeless tour together with For the Fallen Dreams and Asking Alexandria. For 2010 the band was mostly on tour. In January, the band released a cover of the song "Everlong," originally performed by the band Foo Fighters. In May, they went on their Cheer Up Emu Kid tour in Australia, together with Josh's side project Casey Jones and Dropsaw. During that summer they were also playing with other bands like Caliban, Death Before Dishonor and As I Lay Dying on With Full Force in Germany.

In December 2010 they attended the European Persistence Tour 2010, together with Sick of it All, Casey Jones, Unearth and others.

Summer 2011 found Evergreen Terrace on tour with Bury Your Dead, For the Fallen Dreams, and several other bands.

=== Rise Records and Dead Horses ===
In the fall of 2012, the band announced via their Facebook page that Josh James has left Evergreen Terrace to play full-time with Stick To Your Guns, ex-bassist Jason Southwell has rejoined the band, and that they have split with Metal Blade Records. They recently signed a label deal with Rise Records. On October 22, 2013, the band announced over Facebook, that their sixth record, titled Dead Horses, will be released under Rise Records on December 10, 2013.

Brad Moxey was seriously injured on February 8, 2015, causing the band to cancel their upcoming tour.

=== Andrew Carey's departure and return ===
On June 1, 2015, Andrew Carey announced he had quit Evergreen Terrace after 15 years as their vocalist. A statement from Andrew Carey says "I quit Evergreen Terrace. As Danny Glover would often say in the hit movies from the 90's, Lethal Weapon 1, 2, and 3, 'I'm getting too old for this shit.' Thanks to everyone who supported us throughout the years."

In a statement from Evergreen Terrace on Facebook, they say they have been playing shows without Andrew for 'quite a while'. They cite Andrew's focus on a career in nursing as the reason he hasn't been playing shows with the band but are unclear if his focus on his career is also the reason for him deciding to leave Evergreen Terrace.

As of September 2016, Andrew "Drew" Carey is back in the band. A comment to the band's August 10, 2016 Facebook status update "Riffs... Happening..." made by the band on September 9, 2016, states "Did I mention Andrew is back on vocals?". On April 22, 2017, the band announced in addition to Carey that original drummer Christoper Brown was back in the band, although his return would prove to be short-lived. In 2018, the ensemble announced that they are working on a new album.

In July 2022, the band started a European tour but bassist Jason Southwell and drummer Brad Moxey were not present. When asked about their absence, the other band members responded by stating that Southwell was still in the band, but sitting the tour out, and that Moxey had "quit music;" ex-Yellowcard drummer Longineu W. Parsons III was hired as Moxey's replacement. On August 3, Moxey released a statement via Lambgoat confirming the band's statement, saying he was focusing on his family.

On July 31, 2024, Evergreen Terrace released the song "Jail on Christmas" via Lambgoat, the band's first new song since Dead Horses. The song became available for streaming on August 2.

In September 2024, the band withdrew as the headliner from Shell Shock II after the organizers announced that Kyle Rittenhouse would appear as a special guest. The Orlando, Florida concert is described as a "PTSD (Post Traumatic Stress Disorder) Charity and Awareness event to support our military Veterans and first responders." In a statement, the band indicated they would be personally contributing to unnamed veterans' causes.

On March 17, 2026, drummer Longineu Parsons III announced he was no longer in the band and Brad Moxey rejoined.

Evergreen Terrace released a new single "Bolt Cutter" in July 2026.

== Influences ==
Evergreen Terrace cited influences including Shai Hulud, Codeseven, Strongarm, Poison the Well, Weezer, U2, Throwdown, Hatebreed, Rancid, Operation Ivy, NOFX and Dwight Yoakam.

== Members ==
Current

- Andrew "Drew" Carey – lead vocals (1999–2015, 2016–present)
- Craig Chaney – lead guitar, clean vocals (2000–present)
- Jason Southwell – bass guitar (2000–2009, 2012–present)
- Alex Varian – rhythm guitar (2012–present), backing vocals (2010–present), bass guitar (2010–2012)
- Brad Moxey – drums (2013–2017, 2017–2022, 2026–present)

Former

- Josh James – rhythm guitar, backing vocals (1999–2012)
- Joshua "Woody" Willis – lead guitar (1999–2000)
- Joshua Smith – bass (1999–2000)
- Kyle "Butters" Mims – drums (2005–2010)
- Chris Andrews – bass (2009–2010)
- Caleb James – drums (2010–2013)
- Christopher "Panama Al" Brown – drums (1999–2005, 2017)
- Longineu W. Parsons III – drums (2022–2026)
- Jeremy Atkins – vocals (2015–2016)
- Kyle Smith – (touring/fill-in) drums (2019–2022, died in 2025)

== Discography ==
=== Studio albums ===
Year	Title	Label	Chart peaks	
Year	Title	Label	US Heat.	US Indie
2001	Losing All Hope Is Freedom	Indianola	—	—
2002	Burned Alive by Time	Eulogy	—	—
2005	Sincerity Is an Easy Disguise in This Business	Eulogy	23	—
2007	Wolfbiker	Metal Blade	13	34
2009	Almost Home	Metal Blade	17	53
2013	Dead Horses	Rise	19	—

=== Compilations ===
Year	Album	Label
2004	Writer's Block	Eulogy
2004	At Our Worst	Eulogy

=== Extended plays ===
Year	Album	Label	Notes
2000	Evergreen Terrace	Self-released	Songs later released on the At Our Worst compilation
2003	XOne FifthX vs. Evergreen Terrace	Indianola	Split with xOne Fifthx

=== Singles ===
Year	Song
2008	"Blowing Chunks"
2010	"Everlong" (Foo Fighters cover)
2013	"Dead Horses"/"I Want to Conquer the World"
2024	"Jail on Christmas
2025	"Restless Leg Syndrome"

=== Music videos ===
Year	Song	Director	Album
2006	"New Friend Request"	Matthew Stawski	Sincerity Is an Easy Disguise in This Business
2007	"Chaney Can't Quite Riff Like Helmet's Page Hamilton"		Wolfbiker
2010	"Sending Signals"		Almost Home
2010	"Enemy Sex"		Almost Home
2010	"Mario Speedwagon"		Almost Home
2014	"Dead Horses"		Dead Horses

== DVD ==
Date of Release	Title	Label
January 4, 2005	Hotter! Wetter! Stickier! Funner!	Eulogy Recordings
