= Sincerity Is an Easy Disguise in This Business =

Studio album by Evergreen Terrace
- Released: June 21, 2005
- Recorded: February 7–28, 2005
- Genres: Melodic hardcore; metalcore
- Length: 27:49
- Label: Eulogy
- Producer: Daryl Phenneger

Evergreen Terrace chronology
At Our Worst (2004)	Sincerity Is an Easy Disguise in This Business (2005)	Wolfbiker (2007)

Professional ratings
Review scores
Source	Rating
AllMusic	3/5 stars
Punknews	4.5/5 stars
Stylus Magazine	B+
Scream Magazine	3/6 stars

Sincerity Is an Easy Disguise in This Business is the third full-length album released by the melodic hardcore band Evergreen Terrace. This is the last album to feature drummer Christopher Brown. The song "Brave Reality" originally appeared on the cover album Writer's Block. A music video was released for the song "New Friend Request", a first for the band.

== Track listing ==
No.	Title	Length
1.	"Dogfight"	3:16
2.	"Give 'Em the Sleeper"	1:30
3.	"Brave Reality"	2:27
4.	"New Friend Request"	3:56
5.	"Gerald Did What"	1:47
6.	"I Can See My House from Here"	3:00
7.	"The Thunder"	2:21
8.	"I Say You He Dead"	1:08
9.	"The Smell of Summer"	3:26
10.	"Tonight Is the Night We Ride"	2:33
11.	"Untitled Track"	2:25
Total length:		27:49

== Personnel ==
Evergreen Terrace

- Andrew Carey – lead vocals
- Craig Chaney – lead guitar, clean vocals
- Josh James – rhythm guitar, backing vocals
- Jason Southwell – bass guitar
- Christopher Brown – drums

Additional

- Daryl Phenneger – producer, engineer
- Paul Lapinski – mixing and mastering

== Cultural references ==
The band is known for referring to pop culture in their titles, lyrics, and soundbites.

Title	Reference
Sincerity Is an Easy Disguise in This Business	Death to Smoochy
01. Dogfight	-
02. Give 'em the Sleeper	Big Daddy
03. Brave Reality	-
04. New Friend Request	myspace.com
05. Gerald Did What	-
06. I Can See My House from Here	The Simpsons
07. The Thunder	-
08. I Say You He Dead	Family Guy
09. The Smell of Summer	-
10. Tonight Is the Night We Ride	-

== Notable appearances ==
Track 6, "I Can See My House from Here", was notably included in the first gaming video on YouTube.
