= Watchers of Rule =

Studio album by Unearth
- Released: October 28, 2014
- Studio: Audio Hammer Studios
- Genre: Metalcore
- Length: 35:00
- Label: eOne Music
- Producer: Mark Lewis; Unearth

Unearth chronology
Darkness in the Light (2011)	Watchers of Rule (2014)	Extinction(s) (2018)

Watchers of Rule is the sixth studio album by American metalcore band Unearth, released on October 28, 2014 by eOne Music in North America. This marks the first album since their debut The Stings of Conscience that does not feature long time bassist John "Slo" Maggard, as well as the first album to feature former The Faceless drummer Nick Pierce on drums.

== Background ==
Unearth announced in early 2012 that Nick Pierce had signed on as their full-time drummer. He officially replaced Derek Kerswill, who left the band in 2010, though Justin Foley provided drums for 2011's Darkness in the Light. The band announced in April 2013 that they would be working with Mark Lewis to record the then-titleless Watchers of Rule. Lewis had previously produced albums for bands such as The Black Dahlia Murder, Whitechapel, DevilDriver, and Deicide. The album artwork was provided by Richey Beckett, who has also provided artwork for Converge, Baroness, Mastodon, and Metallica.

== Composition ==
The album was their first in three years since Darkness in the Light and was supposed to be released earlier. lead singer Trevor Phipps offered insight into the reason for the albums delay claming "scheduling conflicts." He stated, "It was a difficult record to put together but by the end of it, I think the songs were all there and it’s a f–king awesome record. So we’re all happy it’s about to finally come out." In an interview with Loudwire Phipps noted that it was it was a very aggressive album for he and the band to write and record. When it came to working with their new drummer Nick Pierce Phipps noted that he was more "technically inclined," than their past drummers. Which allowed the band to "take what we do even further." Phipps also made a point to try expand his vocal range on the record incorporating more vicious / harsh vocals. Mark Lewis was chosen to produce the album due to Unearth liking the mix he did on their previous album Darkness in the Light.

The album has been compared to having a more death metal sound composed to their previous releases guitarist Buz McGrath commented on the albums sound stating:

Musically, what we try to do is change it up a little bit, do something to make people talk about it. Unearth is Unearth, you know what you're going to get. Without actually getting cool haircuts and adding keyboard parts, we're like, let's make it more extreme and see how far we can take our skills as musicians and put it on a record. I think our new drummer, Nick Pierce, has a lot to do with that too. He's very capable, he comes from that school of death metal and more modern, technical stuff. So, his influence is heard on the record.

On lyrical themes Phipps commented:

I think the overall picture, with most records of ours, I try to write about what's going on in my life at the time or personal experiences, current events; this record is no different. It's everything that's going on in my life right now.

The deluxe edition of the album features a cover of the Slayer song "Spirt in Black" Unearth made the decision to cover the song in tribute of Slayer guitarist Jeff Hanneman who had died while they were recording the album.

== Release and promotion ==
On September 9, 2014, the album’s first and only single "The Swarm" was released. The songs music video directed by Dale Resteghini and Joel Foster was later released on January 15, 2015.

The album entered the US Billboard 200 at No. 105, selling 3,950 copies in its first week. It is the band's only release for eOne Music, with whom they signed in 2013. It is also the band's first studio album since 2001's The Stings of Conscience to not be released via Metal Blade Records.

Unearth toured worldwide in support of the album first embarking on a US tour with Crowbar and Black Crown Initiate in the December of 2014. In May of 2015 they played multiple headlining shows in Japan, Indonesia and Malaysia, in May they supported Arch Enemy on a European tour. In September and October of 2015 they held a US headlining tour with Wovenwar and finally they toured alongside Nile in Australia to finish the year.

== Critical reception ==
Professional ratings
Review scores
Source	Rating
About.com	3.5/5 stars
Alternative Press	4/5 stars
Blabbermouth.net	8.5/10
Exclaim!	8/10
Metal Injection	Positive
The Music	3.5/5 stars
Ultimate Guitar	8/10
The Aquarian Weekly	Positive
Metal.de	8/10
MetalSucks	4/5 stars

The album was met with positive reception Ray Van Horn, Jr. writing for Blabbermouth.net stated “UNEARTH may destroy drummers from the vigorous demand of their music, but that demand is why this band is tops of their breed. "Watchers of Rule" kills it — and how. Metal Injection added This is definitely one of Unearth’s best albums, and should be considered a benchmark for metalcore in 2014. BRADLEY ZORGDRAGER Bradley Zorgdrager of Exclaim! wrote "Nick Pierce's drumming might've suffocated the rest of the band's efforts through its dogged deluge if it wasn't executed so perfectly; From the blasted intro of "The Swarm" to the tasteful accents throughout, the percussion perfects the anthemic tunes Unearth have become known for. "Trail of Fire" effectively utilizes an undulating groove without becoming too dependent on it. A throwback to The Stings of Conscience comes courtesy of "To the Ground," while the majority push the band into the future, which they're set to rule." Dean Scordilis of The Aquarian also praised the album noting "Unearth have gone to that peak of heaviness and, rather than tipping over the edge, managed to stay at the same level, all while refining and expanding their sound. Watches Of Rule might not be the “heaviest, most brutal” metalcore album out there, but by sticking to their style and making it sound exceptional, Unearth have outdone most of their contemporaries."

The New Noise Magazine ranked Watchers of Rule the 85th best extreme metal album of 2014. The albums single "The Swarm" was inducted into Loudwire’s Death Match Hall of Fame.

== Track listing ==
All tracks are written by Unearth.

No.	Title	Length
1.	"Intro"	0:43
2.	"The Swarm"	3:24
3.	"Lifetime in Ruins"	4:12
4.	"Guards of Contagion"	3:16
5.	"From the Tombs of Five Below"	3:35
6.	"Never Cease"	3:25
7.	"Trail to Fire"	3:30
8.	"To the Ground"	3:15
9.	"Burial Lines"	3:04
10.	"Birth of a Legion"	3:11
11.	"Watchers of Rule"	3:25
Total length:		35:00

Limited edition deluxe version bonus tracks
No.	Title	Lyrics	Music	Length
12.	"Throes of Remission"			3:34
13.	"Spirit in Black" (Slayer cover)	Kerry King	Jeff Hanneman	4:10
Total length:				42:46

Japanese release
No.	Title	Lyrics	Music	Length
1.	"Intro"			0:43
2.	"The Swarm"			3:24
3.	"Lifetime in Ruins"			4:12
4.	"Guards of Contagion"			3:16
5.	"From the Tombs of Five Below"			3:35
6.	"Never Cease"			3:25
7.	"Burial Lines"			3:04
8.	"Birth of a Legion"			3:11
9.	"Watchers of Rule"			3:25
10.	"Throes of Remission"			3:34
11.	"Spirit in Black" (Slayer cover)	Kerry King	Jeff Hanneman	4:10
Total length:				36:01

- "Spirit in Black" writing credits were taken from Seasons in the Abyss.

== Credits ==
Writing, performance and production credits are adapted from the album liner notes.

Unearth

- Trevor Phipps – vocals
- Buz McGrath – lead guitar
- Ken Susi – rhythm guitar
- Nick Pierce – drums

Guest musicians

- Mark Morton – bass

Production

- Mark Lewis – producer, engineer, mixing, mastering
- Shane Frisby – additional vocal recording
- Ken Susi – additional vocal recording, additional guitar tracking
- Jeremy Krull – additional editing

Artwork and design

- Jeremy Saffer – photography
- Richey Beckett – cover design
- Paul Grosso – creative direction
- Andrew Kelley – art direction

Studios

- Audio Hammer Studios – vocals
- The Brick Hit House – additional vocals
- System Studios – additional vocals, guitars, drums

== Charts ==
Chart (2014)	Peak position
Japanese Albums (Oricon)	117
US Billboard 200	105
US Independent Albums (Billboard)	25
US Top Hard Rock Albums (Billboard)	9
US Top Rock Albums (Billboard)	22

== Release history ==
Region	Date	Label
North America	October 28, 2014	eOne Music
Japan	October 29, 2014	Howling Bull
Australia	October 31, 2014	3Wise
Germany, Austria, Switzerland	October 31, 2014	Century Media
Rest of Europe	November 3, 2014	Century Media
