= The March (album) =

Studio album by Unearth
- Released: October 14, 2008
- Genre: Melodic metalcore
- Length: 44:29
- Label: Metal Blade
- Producer: Adam Dutkiewicz

Unearth chronology
III: In the Eyes of Fire (2006)	The March (2008)	Darkness in the Light (2011)

The March is the fourth studio album by American metalcore band Unearth. The album was released on October 14, 2008, through Metal Blade Records. The album is a concept album and has a theme of "symbolizing both the evil and hopeful sides of humanity". This is also their sole album to feature drummer Derek Kerswill, who parted ways with the band in 2010.

== Background and recording ==
In April of 2008, Unearth began finishing up the writing process for the album. Lead singer Trevor Phipps stated "Without going into too much detail about the new tunes, it is harder hitting with more groove than any previous Unearth material." They officially began recording on June 17, and recorded at both System Recording Studios and Zing Studios in Westfield, Massachusetts. By July 30, they had completed recording the album and announced the official track listing. Touching on the recording process guitarist Buzz McGrath stated "We had about 6 months off to come up with the music and a little over a month to record. A lot of the ideas materialized on our own time and when we got together we would put it all together like a puzzle."

Drummer Derek Kerswill initially started out by assisting guitarists Buz McGrath and Ken Susi with writing material for the album. However this led to him eventually recording the drum tracks before he even officially joined the band.

The album was produced by Adam Dutkiewicz of Killswitch Engage, who had also worked the band's previous albums, The Stings of Conscience and The Oncoming Storm.

A version "The Chosen" originally appeared on the Aqua Teen Hunger Force Colon Movie Film for Theaters soundtrack.

The album art was designed by Sons of Nero.

== Concept ==
The album is a concept album as it represents both the evil and the hopeful sides of humanity. Lead singer Trevor Phipps discusses this idea:

The Evil: With the constant balancing act of power within government, religion and our financial institutions, there lies the chance of those most hungry for power to alter and restrict our freedoms for their gain. The Hopeful: This represents the faith in mankind as the most powerful force on the planet. If we come together and do not fight over religion, class and borders then we hold the key to a peaceful world. There are two possible futures in store; either a March of power and greed or a March of a unified human race.

— Trevor Phipps,

In a separate interview guitarist Buz McGrath revealed Phipps lyrics on the album also touch upon politics, personal experiences and stories.

== Release and promotion ==
The album debuted at #45 on the Billboard Top 200 chart with first week sales of just under 11,000 copies. Billboard later showed that "The March", as of early 2009, has sold over 100,000 units worldwide. The album also appeared on Japanese Oricon charts peaking at number 106, along with reaching 31 on UK Independent Albums chart and 25 on the UK Rock & Metal Albums.

Music videos were made for the songs "Grave of Opportunity" and "May Will Be Done."

During the albums release Unearth was already on a U.S. headlining tour with The Acacia Strain and Whitechapel. The first full tour in support of the album came the following month in November, which was a European tour alongside Despised Icon. They held another U.S. headlining tour in January 2009 alongside Emmure and Impending Doom. From May to June of that year they supported Testament on a U.S. tour, during the Summer they embarked on a European tour alongside Chimaira, Unearth, Throwdown and Daath.

The song "Grave of Opportunity" is available as a free downloadable track for the popular console game Guitar Hero World Tour.

Also "We Are Not Anonymous" served as a downloadable content for the Rock Band series on the Rock Band Network Store for 160 Microsoft Points (Xbox Live)

== Critical reception ==
Professional ratings
Review scores
Source	Rating
About.com	3.5/5 stars
AbsolutePunk	7.6/10
AllMusic	4/5 stars
Blabbermouth.net	8/10
Exclaim!	favorable
Metal.de	7/10
PopMatters	5/10
The Music	4.5/5 stars
Ultimate Guitar	9.3/10

The album was met with favorable reviews. Exclaim! Wrote "The March is proof that this genre still has life left to give, reinforcing their rep as one of the greatest metalcore acts of the genre's lifetime."

Blabbermouth.net wrote "it's obvious that progress has been made in both the songwriting and performance departments." Adding "Where many others have branched out to the cusp of reinvention with each passing album, 'The March' has simply unleashed Unearth squared."

Greg Prato, writing for AllMusic, stated "Unearth have pretty much perfected their hardcore-meets-Iron Maiden style/approach by this point. The March proves that all the early accolades were well worth it: Unearth have grown into one of metal's leading outfits." The Music wrote "From the opening sweeps of the first track it's clear that the drive in the Unearth Camp has definitely intensified. In an attempt to prevent themselves from being pigeonholed in the ever expanding metalcore genre the songs have become a lot faster and diversified. Within a few songs of the album it becomes apparent that the boys have put a lot of thought into the structure of the songs rather than writing a tech riff and putting it here or there for the sake of doing so."

Metal.de gave praise to the song writing writing "'My Will Be Done,' 'Grave Of Opportunity,' and 'The Chosen' are three of the best songs the band has ever written. And that is saying something, given what the competition is currently producing."

== Track listing ==
All lyrics are written by Trevor Phipps; all music is composed by Unearth.

No.	Title	Lyrics	Length
1.	"My Will Be Done"		3:37
2.	"Hail the Shrine"		3:58
3.	"Crow Killer"		3:17
4.	"Grave of Opportunity"		3:53
5.	"We Are Not Anonymous"		3:04
6.	"The March"		3:29
7.	"Cutman"		3:12
8.	"The Chosen"		3:53
9.	"Letting Go"	Phipps, Derek Kerswill	4:43
10.	"Truth or Consequence" (4:10 in special edition)	Phipps, John Maggard	11:15
Total length:			44:29

Special edition bonus track
No.	Title	Length
11.	"Our Callous Skin"	10:15
Total length:		54:44

"Truth or Consequence" ends at 4:10, and "Our Callous Skin" fades at 3:12. Whichever song is the final track, after 30 seconds of silence, white noise can be heard, which then slowly fades in and becomes increasingly louder. After exactly two minutes, the white noise stops abruptly and a hidden track entitled "Silence Caught the Stubborn Tongue" begins, which continues, for the remainder of the album.

=== Special Edition Bonus DVD ===
A "Special Edition" of the album (with slip cover) was released on November 10, 2009. It includes a bonus DVD, which is over 80 minutes long. It contains 3 documentaries, 4 live videos, 3 official music videos, and 5 webisodes (originally streamed online during the album's recording). As a special promotion by Metal Blade Records, those who pre-ordered the album would receive an autographed copy (while supplies lasted).

Bonus DVD contents

- The Documentaries

"Making The March"
"The Three Day March"
"Gig Life" 2009

- The Videos

– Live at Wacken 2008 -
"This Glorious Nightmare
"My Heart Bleeds No Longer"
"Black Hearts Now Reign"
"The Great Dividers"

"My Will Be Done" (Music Video)
"Grave Of Opportunity (Music Video)
"Crowkiller" (Music Video)

- Webisodes

Preproduction with Adam D (Part 1)
Preproduction with Adam D (Part 2)
Recording Guitars
Recording Vocals
Recording Back Up Vocals with Norma Jean

== Personnel ==
Production and performance credits are adapted from the album liner notes.

=== Unearth ===
- Trevor Phipps – lead vocals
- Buz McGrath – lead guitar
- Ken Susi – rhythm guitar, backing vocals
- John "Slo" Maggard – bass, backing vocals
- Derek Kerswill – drums

=== Additional musicians ===
- Cory Brandan (Norma Jean) – additional vocals on "Grave of Opportunity", "We are not Anonymous"
- Chris Day (Norma Jean) – additional vocals on "Grave of Opportunity", "We are not Anonymous"
- Scottie Henry (ex-Norma Jean) – additional vocals on "Grave of Opportunity", "We are not Anonymous"
- Jake Schultz (ex-Norma Jean) – additional vocals on "Grave of Opportunity", "We are not Anonymous"
- Pat O'Donnell – additional vocals on "Grave of Opportunity", "We are not Anonymous"
- Wes Pannell – additional vocals on "Grave of Opportunity", "We are not Anonymous"

=== Production ===
- Adam Dutkiewicz – production, engineering
- Jim Fogarty – assistant engineering for drum tracking
- Andy Sneap – mixing, mastering
- Sons of Nero – concept, layout
- Travis Smith – photo illustration
- Phill Mamula – photography
- Chris Kabata – live photography

=== Studios ===
- Zing Recording Studios, Westfield, MA – drums
- System Recordings, Grafton, MA – vocals, guitars, bass
- Backstage Recording Studios, UK – mixing, mastering

== Charts ==
Chart (2008)	Peak position
Japanese Albums (Oricon)	106
UK Independent Albums (Official Charts)	31
UK Rock & Metal Albums (Official Charts)	25
US Billboard 200	45
US Top Hard Rock Albums (Billboard)	4
US Independent Albums (Billboard)	3
US Top Rock Albums (Billboard)	16
US Indie Store Album Sales (Billboard)	11
