= Almost Home (Evergreen Terrace album) =

Studio album by Evergreen Terrace
- Released: September 29, 2009
- Recorded: Spring 2009
- Genres: Melodic hardcore; metalcore
- Length: 37:14
- Label: Metal Blade

Evergreen Terrace chronology
Wolfbiker (2007)	Almost Home (2009)	Dead Horses (2013)

Singles from Almost Home
- 1. "Sending Signals" Released: September 29, 2009; 2. "Enemy Sex" Released: August 4, 2010; 3. "Mario Speedwagon" Released: September 11, 2010

Professional ratings
Review scores
Source	Rating
AllMusic	2.5/5 stars
DecoyMusic.com	4/5 stars
Metal Sucks	2.5/5 stars

Almost Home is the fifth full-length album by American band Evergreen Terrace. Released on September 29, 2009. This is the band's last album featuring Kyle Mims and Josh James. It sold around 2,000 copies in the United States in its first week of release, according to Nielsen SoundScan. The CD landed at position No. 17 on the TopHeatseekers chart.

== Track listing ==
No.	Title	Length
1.	"Enemy Sex"	3:31
2.	"Almost Home (III)"	3:49
3.	"God Rocky, Is This Your Face?" (feat. Tim Lambesis)	2:46
4.	"We're Always Losing Blood"	4:01
5.	"Sending Signals"	4:29
6.	"Mario Speedwagon"	2:29
7.	"Failure to Operate"	3:11
8.	"Hopelessly Hopeless"	4:12
9.	"The Letdown"	1:46
10.	"I'm a Bulletproof Tiger"	3:16
11.	"Not Good Enough"	3:44
Total length:		37:14

== Personnel ==
Evergreen Terrace

- Andrew Carey - vocals
- Kyle Mims - drums
- Josh James - guitar
- Craig Chaney - guitar, vocals

Production

- Stan Martell - bass, additional guitar on "Sending Signals" and "Almost Home (III)"
- Album artwork by Clark Orr
- Music tracking by Stan Martell
- Vocal tracking by Jason Suecof
- Mastering by Mike Fuller

== Cultural references ==
The band is known for referring to pop culture in their titles, lyrics, and soundbites.

Title	Reference
Almost Home	-
01. Enemy Sex	-
02. Almost Home (111)	Florida State Road 111
03. God Rocky, Is This Your Face?	Mask, Family Guy
04. We're Always Losing Blood	-
05. Sending Signals	-
06. Mario Speedwagon	REO Speedwagon
07. Failure To Operate	-
08. The Letdown	-
09. I'm A Bulletproof Tiger	Kenny Powers
10. Not Good Enough	-
