= Above the Fall of Man =

EP by Unearth
- Released: May 1999
- Recorded: 1998
- Studios: Prophet Sound, Boston, Massachusetts
- Genre: Metalcore
- Length: 17:03
- Label: Endless Fight Records

Unearth chronology
Above the Fall of Man (1999)	The Stings of Conscience (2001)

Professional ratings
Review scores
Source	Rating
AllMusic	1.5/5 stars

Above the Fall of Man is the first EP by American metalcore band Unearth, released in May 1999. The entire EP appears on their 2005 compilation album Our Days of Eulogy.

== Track listing ==
No.	Title	Length
1.	"Shattered by the Sun"	3:51
2.	"Call to Judgement"	3:34
3.	"Convictions"	4:23
4.	"Lefty"	5:18
Total length:		17:03

== Credits ==
- Trevor – vocals
- Buz – lead guitar
- Ken – rhythm guitar
- Rover – bass
- Mike – drums
