= Darkness in the Light (album) =

Studio album by Unearth
- Released: July 5, 2011
- Genre: Metalcore
- Length: 38:48
- Label: Metal Blade
- Producer: Adam Dutkiewicz

Unearth chronology
The March (2008)	Darkness in the Light (2011)	Watchers of Rule (2014)

Professional ratings
Aggregate scores
Source	Rating
Metacritic	75/100
Review scores
Source	Rating
About.com	3.5/5 stars
Alternative Press	4/5 stars
Blabbermouth.net	6/10
Metal Injection	8/10
Metal.de	9/10
PopMatters	8/10
Rock Sound	7/10
The Music	4/5 stars
Ultimate Guitar	9/10

Darkness in the Light is the fifth studio album by American metalcore band Unearth. The album was released on July 5, 2011 through Metal Blade Records. The album features drummer Justin Foley of Killswitch Engage on all tracks.

== Background ==
The band began working on Darkness in the Light nearly three years after relentlessly touring on their previous album The March (2008). The band noted that they wanted to begin working on the follow up much sooner however every time they settled down to write, they got another tour offer.

On October 25, 2010, Unearth issued a statement saying they and drummer Derek Kerswill had amicably parted ways. The band stated there was no bad blood towards Kerswill, and that the situation was purely based on musical differences. They then selected Killswitch Engage drummer Justin Foley to fill in on drums for the album.

== Recording ==
Darkness in the Light was recorded at Zing Studios in Westfield, Massachusetts with producer Adam Dutkiewicz. The effort was mixed by Mark Lewis from Audiohammer Studios in Sanford, Florida. They began pre production on the album in November 2010. Killswitch Engage drummer Justin Foley was selected as the sit in for the band during the recording process. By January 2011, the group announced he had begun tracking the drum tracks at Zing Studios in Westfield, Massachusetts. On March, 16, it was announced they had finished the recording process and planned to release the album that summer.

When asked about the album's title the band stated "We had a few different titles for this record, but we chose this one because it made the most sense with the recurring themes of darkness throughout the album. A good amount of the tunes talk about the darker aspects of life and what it throws at you."

The album notably features a greater amount of clean vocals from lead singer Trevor Phipps. It also features clean backing vocals from guitarist Ken Susi which hadn’t been done since their 2004 album The Oncoming Storm.

== Release ==
The album's first and only single "Eyes of Black" was released on May 11, 2011. A music video for "Watch It Burn" was later released in February 2012. The album sold 6,400 copies in its first week debuting at number 72 on the Billboard 200. Internationally it also reached number 99 in Germany and 45 in Canada.

== Critical reception ==
Upon release Darkness in the Light received positive reviews and has a 75/100 on Metacritic based on five reviews. Metal Injection gave the album a 8/10 writing "Aside from the clean vocals thrown in here and there, you won’t find too many things to separate Darkness from Unearth’s back-catalog." They added "If you dig Metalcore and want to stick with those who do it the best, then Darkness in the Light should do you just fine." Metal.de gave the album 9/10 noting that the album has "plenty of highlights to choose from" and dubbing it "the best album UNEARTH has ever made—and certainly one of the best releases of recent years within the broad spectrum of modern metal."

PopMatters also praised the album stating "Many have predicted that Unearth would stumble and lose their credibility during the past seven years. Those doubters that still remain will be left in waiting once again by Darkness in the Light. Continuing their trend of consistency and refining the minor missteps of their older work, Unearth have proven once again that they are uncompromising in their standards and stalwart in their musical vision. Adding Darkness in the Light is the latest declaration of Unearth’s greatness, and a sign that there is only more top-notch metal to come." Similarly, The Music added "Darkness in the Light' probably opens itself up a tad more to indifferent critique but on face-value there is nothing glaringly wrong or rather anything overly concerning. You can continue to try and find fault but Unearth seem too stoic and seasoned to produce an underwhelming effort. Perhaps 'Darkness in the Light' is not much of a progression but instead it is an album that stands well against its peers."

Blabbermouth.net was more critical of the album writing "Overall, on 'Darkness in the Light' UNEARTH fails too often to make the kind of unflappable, convincing impact that defined earlier works. 'Good enough' just doesn't cut it for a band like UNEARTH."

== Track listing ==
All lyrics are written by Trevor Phipps except where noted; all music is composed by Unearth.

No.	Title	Lyrics	Length
1.	"Watch It Burn"		4:06
2.	"Ruination of the Lost"		3:35
3.	"Shadows in the Light"		3:45
4.	"Eyes of Black"		3:53
5.	"Last Wish"		3:06
6.	"Arise the War Cry"		3:55
7.	"Equinox"		2:58
8.	"Coming of the Dark"		3:07
9.	"The Fallen"		3:35
10.	"Overcome"	Phipps, Ken Susi	3:11
11.	"Disillusion"		3:37
Total length:			38:48

== Credits ==
Production and performance credits are adapted from the album liner notes.

=== Personnel ===
Unearth

- Trevor Phipps – lead vocals
- Buz McGrath – lead guitar
- Ken Susi – rhythm guitar, backing vocals
- John "Slo" Maggard – bass, piano, backing vocals

Session musicians

- Justin Foley – drums

Additional musicians

- Jessie Crandall – group vocals
- Ryan Bentley – group vocals
- Adam Crouse – group vocals
- Karl Lawson – group vocals
- Pat Politano – group vocals
- Chad Boudreau – group vocals
- Adam Stasio – group vocals

Production

- Alan Douches – mastering
- Adam Dutkiewicz – production, engineering
- James Mercer – cover
- Miked (Darkicon Design) – layout, package design
- Mark Lewis – mixing
- Dave Stauble – band photo
- Ken Susi – co-production, engineering

=== Studios ===
- Zing Recording Studios, Westfield, MA – vocals, drums, piano
- System Recordings, Grafton, MA – vocals, guitars
- Wicked Good Studios, Southampton, MA – bass
- West Westside Mastering Studio – mastering
- Audiohammer Studios, Sanford, FL – mixing

== Charts ==
Chart performance for Darkness in the Light
Chart (2011)	Peak position
Canadian Albums (Nielsen SoundScan)	45
German Albums (Offizielle Top 100)	99
UK Independent Albums (Official Charts)	50
US Billboard 200	72
US Independent Albums (Billboard)	14
US Top Hard Rock Albums (Billboard)	7
US Top Rock Albums (Billboard)	21
US Top Tastemaker Albums (Billboard)	19
