= Alive from the Apocalypse =

Video by Unearth
- Released: April 1, 2008
- Recorded: October 9, 2007
- Venue: Glass House in Pomona, California
- Genre: Melodic metalcore
- Label: Metal Blade
- Director: Doug Spangenberg

Alive from the Apocalypse is the first and only live album by the American metalcore band Unearth. It was released via Metal Blade Records on April 1, 2008.

== Content ==
The DVD’s first disc contains Unearth’s live performance at the Glass House in Pomona, California on October 9, 2007. The second disc is an hour and a half long documentary covering the bands formative underground years in Eastern Massachusetts, to their rise in popularity. Along with this there are multiple interviews from band members of bands such as Killswitch Engage, Slipknot, Lamb of God, All That Remains and As I Lay Dying. Also included are all of the band's music videos, two additional live songs, and a photo slideshow of the band’s career up to the point of the DVD’s release.

== Critical reception ==
Professional ratings
Review scores
| Source | Rating |
|---|---|
| Blabbermouth.net | 9.5/10 |
| Ultimate Guitar | 9.3/10 |
| Metal.de | 9/10 |

For the live performance part of the DVD Blabbermouth.net wrote "This one is worth watching over and over again. The only thing that keeps the DVD from being a perfect 10 is that between-song banter, etc is edited out (rather than capturing the performance front to back with no interruption),and that's a very minor bitch. As for the second disc they stated "the documentary is informative, entertaining, and funny as hell."

== Track listing ==
| No. | Title | Length |
|---|---|---|
| 1. | "Giles" | 3:59 |
| 2. | "This Lying World" | 4:27 |
| 3. | "This Glorious Nightmare" | 4:39 |
| 4. | "Zombie Autopilot" | 4:11 |
| 5. | "Endless" | 3:28 |
| 6. | "March Of The Mutes" | 4:03 |
| 7. | "Only The People" | 4:02 |
| 8. | "Sanctity Of Brothers" | 3:28 |
| 9. | "The Great Dividers" | 4:22 |
| 10. | "Black Hearts Now Reign" | 5:21 |
| 11. | "One Step Away" | 3:57 |

== Personnel ==
Unearth

- Buz McGrath – lead guitar
- Ken Susi – rhythm guitar
- John "Slo" Maggard – bass
- Trevor Phipps – lead vocals
- Mike Justian – drums

== Charts ==
| Chart (2008) | Peak position |
|---|---|
| Canada Top Video/DVD (Music Canada) | 15 |
| US DVD (Billboard) | 13 |

== Certifications ==
| Region | Certification | Certified units/sales |
|---|---|---|
| Canada (Music Canada) | Gold | 5000 ^ |
^{^} Shipments figures based on certification alone.
