= Extinction(s) =

Studio album by Unearth
- Released: November 23, 2018
- Recorded: March – May 2018
- Studios: Graphic Nature Studios (Belleville, New Jersey); The Brick HitHouse (Hyannis, Massachusetts)
- Genre: Metalcore
- Length: 37:55
- Label: Century Media
- Producer: Will Putney

Unearth chronology
Watchers of Rule (2014)	Extinction(s) (2018)	The Wretched; the Ruinous (2023)

Singles from Extinction(s)
- 1. "Incinerate" Released: July 2, 2018; 2. "Survivalist" Released: September 28, 2018; 3. "One with the Sun" Released: November 15, 2018

Extinction(s) is the seventh studio album by American metalcore band Unearth, released on November 23, 2018, via Century Media. This is their first album to feature bassist Chris O'Toole. This album also the last album to feature rhythm guitarist Ken Susi and drummer Nick Pierce.

== Background and recording ==
Initial information about the follow-up to Watchers of Rule surfaced in early 2018 when Daniel "DL" Laskiewicz, ex-guitarist of The Acacia Strain, revealed that he had been helping out with the new Unearth album by bouncing riff ideas with Unearth guitarists Buz McGrath and Ken Susi. In a February 2018 interview, McGrath stated that the band "got probably twenty songs written" for the new album. On March 16, 2018, the band officially signed worldwide deal with Century Media Records and revealed that recording of the new album would be started soon, scheduled for a tentative late summer or early fall 2018 release.

On March 26, 2018, the band entered Graphic Nature Studio with Will Putney to begin recording their new album. Drums were recorded by Adam Dutkiewicz, guitarist of Killswitch Engage. Bass guitar, guitar solo and vocals were tracked at the Brick HitHouse, and strings and piano were done by Randy Slaugh.

In an interview with New Noise Magazine, vocalist Trevor Phipps stated "There was a conscious effort on Extinction(s) to mix our original sound and energy with where we’ve come as players and songwriters, as well as try a few new things. The final product sounds different than anything we’ve ever done, but on most songs, you can still hear that it is Unearth."

In 2023 Phipps revealed that the album was originally supposed to be a concept record noting "We got halfway there, but then I was pulled in different directions, because some were Ken songs, some were (second guitarist) Buz (McGrath) songs, some were songs they wrote together."

== Release ==
On July 2, 2018, the band announced that the new album will be entitled Extinction(s), and released "Incinerate", the first single of Extinction(s). On September 18, 2018, the band revealed the release date, tracklist and artwork for Extinction(s), which would be released on November 23, 2018, through Century Media. A lyric video of the second single "Survivalist" was available for streaming on September 28, 2018. A music video of the song "One with the Sun" was released on November 15, 2018.

The band commented on Extinction(s):

Extinction(s) is full of venom toward the wrongs of the world, fighting back against the precarious position civilization is in, determined to effect some kind of change. The inevitability of death, loss, and tragedy is a persistent theme throughout Extinction(s), deep within the band's most profound and hard-hitting lyrics thus far.

The band also elaborated on the song "Incinerate":

"Incinerate" brings the raw aggression and heaviness of our early material while also showcasing elements of where we've gone as a band since. Lyrically, it is meant to be a song of unity in a time of great polarization around the world. We are constantly being told to not like our neighbor because they might have different views. The theme is a faith in humanity to come together and combat and rid the world of those that are intentionally dividing us.

The third and final single "One with the Sun" was released on November 15, 2018, alongside an official music video. A fourth and final music video was later released for the song "No Reprisal" on February 20, 2019.

== Critical reception ==
Professional ratings
Review scores
Source	Rating
Angry Metal Guy	3.5/5 stars
Cryptic Rock	5/5 stars
Metal Injection	7.5/10 stars
Metal.de	8/10
The Music	5/5 stars
New Noise Magazine	5/5 stars

The album was met with positive reception, with New Noise Magazine writing “The band presents a vast and engaging metallic sound while at the same time maintaining an important edge that never really lets up.” Metal Injection wrote “Metalcore haters will quickly dismiss this album, trotting out the usual lines about creative stagnation and so on. Extinction(s) is clearly an album with an agenda, a series of songs intended to fire up live shows rather than break the mold and change the course of history, but turn it up until your ears bleed and you won’t give more than half a fuck.” Dan McHugh of Distorted Sound Magazine gave the album a 9/10, stating "Unearth have returned firing in all cylinders with an album built for the stage. Previous effort Watchers Of Rule divided opinion but Extinction(s) is a captivating resurgence of everything we have come to love about Unearth with added focus and intensity. For a band to release their strongest album 20 years deep into their career is a testament to their drive, devotion and commitment to music. They have already inspired an entire generation and with Extinction(s) they have continued to show why they’re still up there with the cream of metalcore."

Metal Injection wrote "Metalcore haters will quickly dismiss this album, trotting out the usual lines about creative stagnation and so on. Extinction(s) is clearly an album with an agenda, a series of songs intended to fire up live shows rather than break the mold and change the course of history, but turn it up until your ears bleed and you won’t give more than half a fuck. You’ll be too busy rocking out, and wondering whether or not your medical insurance covers aural injuries." Joe Smith of Exclaim! gave the record a more neutral review, claiming "Hardcore Unearth fans will likely find some worthwhile material on Extinction(s), but even for a fan of the band, this album is a bit of a letdown."

The Music dubbed it "one of the best metalcore releases of 2018."

== Track listing ==
All lyrics are written by Trevor Phipps; all music is composed by Unearth, except where noted.

No.	Title	Music	Length
1.	"Incinerate"	Unearth; Daniel "DL" Laskiewicz	3:59
2.	"Dust"	Unearth; Laskiewicz	3:53
3.	"Survivalist"		4:14
4.	"Cultivation of Infection"		3:54
5.	"The Hunt Begins"		3:55
6.	"Hard Lined Downfall"		3:11
7.	"King of the Arctic"	Unearth; Laskiewicz	4:00
8.	"Sidewinder"		2:51
9.	"No Reprisal"	Unearth; Laskiewicz	3:21
10.	"One with the Sun"	Unearth; Laskiewicz	4:37
Total length:			37:55

== Personnel ==
Unearth

- Trevor Phipps – lead vocals
- Buz McGrath – lead guitar
- Ken Susi – rhythm guitar, backing vocals
- Chris O'Toole – bass, backing vocals
- Nick Pierce – drums

Additional musician

- Randy Slaugh – string arrangements, piano (track 10)
- Sunny Phipps – additional vocals

Production

- Will Putney – production, engineering, mixing, mastering
- Adam Dutkiewicz – engineering (drums)
- Daniel Castleman – engineering
- Shane Frisby – engineering
- Forefathers – layout
- Dan Bradley – photography
