= Casey Jones (band) =

American hardcore punk band (2003–2012)

- Origin: Jacksonville, Florida, U.S.
- Genres: Hardcore punk; melodic hardcore
- Years active: 2003–2012
- Labels: Independent, Eulogy, Indianola
- Spinoff of: Evergreen Terrace
- Past members: Josh James; Caleb James; James Siboni; Evan Judd; John Howard; Josh Smith; Nate Zoeller; Jason Southwell; Josh Card

Casey Jones was an American straight-edge hardcore punk band from Jacksonville, Florida. The band consisted of members from Evergreen Terrace and Anchors Away and was signed to Eulogy Records. They released three albums and a split 7-inch.

== History ==
Casey Jones formed in early 2003 as a side project of Evergreen Terrace. The band's name is taken from the Teenage Mutant Ninja Turtles character Casey Jones.

They cited influences including Trial and Good Riddance.

The band was originally started by Josh James of Evergreen Terrace, his brother Caleb, and Josh Smith (former member of Evergreen Terrace). Shortly after forming, the band wrote several songs and recorded a five-song demo entitled Are Some Crucial Dudes. Not long after this, the band recorded their first full-length The Few, the Proud, the Crucial which was released on Indianola Records. After several member changes, the band recorded their second full-length, The Messenger, which was released on Eulogy Records in June 2006. In 2008 the band departed Eulogy.

Casey Jones released their final album, I Hope We're Not the Last, on January 11, 2011. It also marked the band's final year of touring.

Casey Jones disbanded in 2012. After disbanding Casey Jones released a documentary about the life and death of the band entitled Start To Finish.

== Members ==
- Josh James – vocals
- Caleb James – drums
- James Siboni – bass
- Evan Judd – guitar
- John Howard – guitar
- Jason Southwell – guitar
- Josh Smith – bass
- Josh Card – guitar

== Discography ==
- The Few, the Proud, the Crucial (2004) – Indianola Records
- The Messenger (2006) – Eulogy Records
- I Hope We're Not the Last (2011) – Independent Release

== Documentary ==
- Start To Finish (2012)
