= Endless (EP) =

EP by Unearth
- Released: September 17, 2002
- Recorded: 2000 ("My Desire"), Jan, 2002
- Genre: Metalcore
- Length: 15:03
- Label: Eulogy Recordings
- Producer: Adam Dutkiewicz

Unearth chronology
The Stings of Conscience (2001)	Endless (2002)	The Oncoming Storm (2004)

Professional ratings
Review scores
Source	Rating
Allmusic	2.5/5 stars
Lambgoat	8/10 stars
PunkNews	3/5 stars

Endless is the second EP by American metalcore band Unearth, released in September 2002.

== Overview ==
Endless is the band's last original release under Eulogy Recordings before moving to Metal Blade Records for their later releases, and is the last record with drummer Mike Rudberg and bassist Chris Rybicki, the latter featured in the 2000 demo version of "My Desire". Buz McGrath and John Maggard played bass on the other three tracks, which were recorded by Killswitch Engage guitarist Adam Dutkiewicz.

The EP was re-released as a vinyl (7") by Confined Records and only contains the tracks "Endless" and "My Desire". The entire EP also appears on their 2005 compilation album Our Days of Eulogy.

The song "Endless" features a tribute the band's first record label, Endless Fight Records, during a breakdown when the phrase "endless fight" is repeatedly screamed by vocalist Trevor Phipps. The song's lyrics also contain the phrase "winds of plague," which inspired the name of a subsequent band called Winds of Plague.

The album cover is an original piece by artist Derek Hess.

== Critical reception ==
Moldy of PunkNews added "Sound wise this band is defiantly metal with sounds similar to Pantera and Slayer, but in some of the vocal deliveries, there was more of a hardcore feel, really reminded me of Poison the Well sometimes. It sucks that this is just an EP, and is only 4 songs long, it makes for a quick listen, and left me wanting more."

== Track listing ==
No.	Title	Length
1.	"Endless" (Later appears on their 2004 LP The Oncoming Storm)	3:17
2.	"Internal War"	3:44
3.	"The Charm" (Later appears as a bonus track on The Oncoming Storm)	3:09
4.	"My Desire (Demo)" (Non-demo version previously appeared on their 2001 LP The Stings of Conscience)	4:53
Total length:		15:03
