= Wolfbiker =

Studio album by Evergreen Terrace
- Released: July 24, 2007
- Recorded: March 2007
- Genres: Melodic hardcore, metalcore
- Length: 34:48
- Label: Metal Blade
- Producer: Daryl Phenneger

Evergreen Terrace chronology
Sincerity Is an Easy Disguise in This Business (2005)	Wolfbiker (2007)	Almost Home (2009)

Professional ratings
Review scores
Source	Rating
AbsolutePunk	79%
About.com	3.5/5 stars
AllMusic	2.5/5 stars
IGN	5.5/10 stars

Wolfbiker is the fourth studio album by American band Evergreen Terrace and their first release on Metal Blade Records. It was released on July 24, 2007. It is the band's first album to feature drummer Kyle Mims. "Chaney Can't Quite Riff Like Helmet's Page Hamilton" was the first single and first music video for the album. It was produced by Brian Thompson and 1171 Productions. The video included loads of fans and friends from Jacksonville and surrounding areas. The video premiered Saturday, October 13th on MTV2's Headbanger's Ball. The song was named after the closing quote of a review of Sincerity Is an Easy Disguise in This Business by Alternative Press.

== Track listing ==
All music and lyrics by Evergreen Terrace, except for track 4 by Evergreen Terrace and Jared Boice.

No.	Title	Length
1.	"Bad Energy Troll"	2:35
2.	"High Tide or No Tide"	3:06
3.	"Wolfbiker"	2:41
4.	"Chaney Can't Quite Riff Like Helmet's Page Hamilton" (feat. Jared Boice)	4:40
5.	"Where There Is Fire We Will Carry Gasoline"	3:26
6.	"Rip This!"	2:41
7.	"Starter"	3:39
8.	"To the First Baptist Church of Jacksonville"	4:59
9.	"Rolling Thunder Mental Illness"	1:27
10.	"The Damned"	5:34
Total length:		34:48

== Personnel ==
Evergreen Terrace

- Andrew Carey – unclean vocals
- Craig Chaney – lead guitar, clean vocals
- Josh James – rhythm guitar, backing vocals
- Jason Southwell – bass
- Kyle Mims – drums

Additional

- Jared Boice – guitar solo on track 4
- Daryl Phenneger – producer, tracking
- Jason Livermore – mastering, mixing
- Shaun Thurston – cover art
- Brian J. Ames – layout design
- Tim Lambesis – A&R

== Cultural references ==
The band is known for referring to pop culture in their titles, lyrics, and soundbites.

Title	Reference
1. "Bad Energy Troll"	Grandma's Boy
2. "High Tide or No Tide"	-
3. "Wolfbiker"	-
4. "Chaney Can't Quite Riff like Helmet's Page Hamilton"	Helmet
5. "Where There is Fire We Will Carry Gasoline"	Waking Life (including a sample)
6. "Rip This!"	-
7. "Starter"	Romeo & Juliet
8. "To the First Baptist Church of Jacksonville"	-
9. "Rolling Thunder Mental Illness"	Rolling Thunder - An Anarchist Journal of Dangerous Living
10. "The Damned"	-
