= III: In the Eyes of Fire =

Studio album by Unearth
- Released: August 8, 2006
- Studios: Studio X, Seattle, Washington
- Genre: Melodic metalcore
- Length: 43:59
- Label: Metal Blade
- Producer: Terry Date

Unearth chronology
Our Days of Eulogy (2005)	III: In the Eyes of Fire (2006)	The March (2008)

Professional ratings
Review scores
Source	Rating
About.com	4/5 stars
Blabbermouth.net	8/10
Exclaim!	favorable
Lambgoat	7/10
Metal Storm	7.8/10
Metal.de	7/10
Punknews.org	3.5/5 stars
Ultimate Guitar	9.7/10

III: In the Eyes of Fire is the third studio album by American metalcore band Unearth, released on August 8, 2006. The album entered the Billboard album charts at number 35, selling approximately 22,000 copies. As of 2021 the album had sold in excess of 110,000 copies in the US.

The album was produced by Terry Date, and was their second major release through Metal Blade Records. A special limited-edition version of the album was released (in a digipak), containing a DVD showcasing their performance at the 2005 Sounds of the Underground tour, as well as a look at the making of the album. It is the band's final album to feature drummer Mike Justian until 2023's The Wretched; the Ruinous.

== Background and recording ==
In November 2005, Unearth unveiled that they were writing a new album, a follow up to 2004's The Oncoming Storm. Vocalist Trevor Phipps described the album as "faster, heavier and darker than anything we have ever done." In a February 2006 interview with Alternative Press, guitarist Ken Susi shared that the band would be recording their third full-length release in the upcoming spring. That March, Unearth entered Studio X with producer Terry Date to begin recording. Date would additionally handle mixing duties for the release. The band provided updates from the studio as recording progressed via a series of videos published to the Metal Blade website. In late March the band revealed that the title for the release; III: In the Eyes of Fire. In a statement the band described the album as their "angriest, darkest, fastest and heaviest record to date."

On the album's lyrical themes, Phipps shared:

Last record we wrote about things brewing all around us in politics, environmental issues and war, but this record deals with the effects of those very things and the consequences we are all dealing with right now and will continue to deal with until changes are made. We are in our nations most critical point since the 60's and more importantly devastation looms in the near future if we continue to make mistake after mistake with unjust wars and environmental disregard. The title also represents the personal struggles we all face day to day and our constant battles to overcome adversity.

== Release and promotion ==
In May, the band shot a music video for the track "Giles" with director Darren Doane. The band published a trailer for the video in mid-June. Additionally in June, the band made the track "Giles" available for online streaming exclusively through the Ozzfest.com website, and made the album's track listing available.

The album's release date was set for August 8 in the United States, and August 14 in Europe, with the exception of Austria, Germany, and Switzerland, in which it would be available on August 11. A limited-edition version of III: In the Eyes of Fire included a bonus DVD containing the "making of" footage for the album and a live video which was filmed on the Sounds of The Underground tour.

A day prior to its release, the album was made available for streaming online via AOL Music.

Following the album's release in August 2006, the band embarked on the "Sanctity of Brothers" tour alongside Bleeding Through, Terror, Through The Eyes Of The Dead, and Animosity In November they toured Europe alongside Hatebreed and Full Blown Chaos. In January 2007, the band completed a music video for the track "Sanctity of Brothers." Directed by Soren, the video was the band's first to use special effects. The video was made available for streaming online via MySpace.com in February 2007. Prior to the tour, the band appeared on 94.1 HJY of Providence Rhode Island to discuss the upcoming tour, as well as play clips of the album. They also toured alongside Slayer in early 2007.

In May 2007, drummer Mike Justian would depart the band. In a statement the band shared that they had "grown apart as individuals. Justian would return to the band in 2022.

Unearth appeared on Sirus Satellite Radio's Hard Attack in September of 2007 to promote the album.

In October of 2007, exclusively via Headbanger's Blog, the band released a music video for the album's opening track "This Glorious Nightmare."

In November 2007, the band debuted live footage of the track "This Glorious Nightmare" on California's "longest-running rock'n'roll TV Show," "Capital Chaos." The footage was shot at The Boardwalk in Orangevale, California on October 12, 2007.

== Reception ==
Commercially, the album debuted at no. 35 on the Billboard 200, selling 22,000 units in its first week of release. The album would go on to sell over 110,000 copies in the United States, making it the band's best-selling release as of 2021.

The album was met with positive reviews upon its release, with AllMusic calling it one of 2006's "finest heavy rock releases." Blabbermouth.net praised the band for refusing to bow to contemporary trends, with Exclaim! adding that although the release did not advance the genre, Unearth confirmed "that the hype [surrounding them] is deserved" with the album. A reviewer of Ultimate Guitar wrote "I love the way that the lyrics seem to flow with the guitar riffs in this album. Since The Oncoming Storm, Trevor Phipps has gotten away from the ever so annoying scream you hear on just about every metal song. It seems as if he's gotten his own distinct sound on this record, which is a very good thing."

== Track listing ==
All lyrics are written by Trevor Phipps; all music is composed by Unearth.

No.	Title	Lyrics	Length
1.	"This Glorious Nightmare"		4:22
2.	"Giles"		3:58
3.	"March of the Mutes"		4:02
4.	"Sanctity of Brothers"		3:29
5.	"The Devil Has Risen"		3:22
6.	"This Time Was Mine"		4:10
7.	"Unstoppable"		5:05
8.	"So It Goes"	Phipps, John Maggard, Mike Justian	5:02
9.	"Impostors Kingdom"		3:23
10.	"Bled Dry"	Phipps, Ken Susi	3:55
11.	"Big Bear and the Hour of Chaos" (instrumental)		3:09
Total length:			43:59

Special edition bonus DVD
No.	Title	Length
1.	"The Making of III: In The Eyes of Fire"	17:27
2.	"The Great Dividers" (live from Sounds of the Underground 2005)
3.	"This Lying World" (live from Sounds of the Underground 2005)
4.	"Only the People" (live from Sounds of the Underground 2005)
5.	"Black Hearts Now Reign" (live from Sounds of the Underground 2005)

== Personnel ==
Production and performance credits are adapted from the album liner notes.

Unearth

The whole band is credited for: co-production, art direction

- Trevor Phipps – lead vocals
- Buz McGrath – lead guitar
- Ken Susi – rhythm guitar, backing vocals
- John "Slo" Maggard – bass, backing vocals
- Mike Justian – drums

Production

- Terry Date – production, recording, mixing
- Sam Hofstedt – additional engineering
- Scott Olson – additional engineering
- Ted Jensen – mastering
- Jessie Smith – drum tech
- Jerad Knudson – photography
- Doug Spanenberg (director; "The Making of III: In The Eyes Of Fire")

== Charts ==
Chart (2006)	Peak position
German Albums (Offizielle Top 100)	86
Japanese Albums (Oricon)	120
UK Albums (Official Charts)	150
UK Independent Albums (Official Charts)	9
UK Rock & Metal Albums (Official Charts)	11
US Billboard 200	35
US Independent Albums (Billboard)	2
US Top Rock Albums (Billboard)	12
US Indie Store Album Sales (Billboard)	8

== Trivia ==
- Some copies of the regular version include a bonus disc containing hits from some of Metal Blade Records' most known bands.
- Limited Edition copies include a bonus disc with two live tracks recorded in Sayreville, New Jersey
- The front cover contains the Latin words "in oculis ignis", which roughly translates to "in the eyes of fire."
- Giles was based on Giles Corey.
- "Big Bear and the Hour of Chaos," according to Phipps, was recorded in one full hour while the band was drinking a brand of malt liquor called "Big Bear."
- "March of the Mutes" references the Great Fire of Rome.
