= Burned Alive by Time =

Studio album by Evergreen Terrace
- Released: November 26, 2002
- Studios: Studio 13, Deerfield Beach, Florida, United States
- Genres: Melodic hardcore, metalcore, post-hardcore
- Length: 31:42
- Labels: Eulogy, Mind Over Matter
- Producer: Jeremy Staska

Evergreen Terrace chronology
Losing All Hope Is Freedom (2001)	Burned Alive by Time (2002)	At Our Worst (2004)

Professional ratings
Review scores
Source	Rating
Punknews	4.5/5 stars

Burned Alive by Time is the second full-length album released by melodic hardcore band Evergreen Terrace. Originally released in 2002, the album was re-released on vinyl LP in 2009 via the Grand Rapids, Michigan-based label Mind Over Matter Records.

== Track listing ==
No.	Title	Length
1.	"Understanding the Fear That Lies Within"	4:02
2.	"No Donnie, These Men Are Nihilists"	2:19
3.	"Burned Alive by Time"	2:36
4.	"Dear Live Journal"	3:50
5.	"Funeral Grade Flowers"	2:58
6.	"My Heart Beats in Breakdowns"	2:03
7.	"Taking Care of the Dead Fish"	3:37
8.	"Please Hammer Don't Hurt 'Em"	2:24
9.	"Absence of Purpose in the Succession of Events"	1:35
10.	"Heavy Number One (aka: Shizzle My Nizzle) / "Enjoy the Silence""	6:19
Total length:		31:42

Note

- "Heavy Number One (aka: Shizzle My Nizzle)" contains a hidden cover track, "Enjoy the Silence" originally by Depeche Mode. The first song ends at 2:27; "Enjoy the Silence" begins at 2:40.

== Personnel ==
- Andrew Carey – lead vocals
- Craig Chaney – lead guitar, clean vocals
- Josh James – rhythm guitar, backing vocals
- Jason Southwell – bass guitar
- Christopher Brown – drums

== Cultural references ==
The band is infamous for referring to pop culture in their titles, lyrics, and soundbites.

Title	Reference
Burned Alive by Time	-
01. Understanding the Fear that Lies Within	-
02. No Donnie, These Men are Nihilist	The Big Lebowski
03. Burned Alive by Time	-
04. Dear Live Journal	livejournal.com
05. Funeral Grade Flowers	Survivor by Chuck Palahniuk
06. My Heart Beats in Breakdowns	metalcore and breakdowns
07. Taking Care of the Dead Fish	Survivor by Chuck Palahniuk
08. Please Hammer Don't Hurt 'Em	"MC Hammer"
09. Absence of Purpose in the Succession of Events	-
10. Heavy Number One (AKA: Shizzle My Nizzle)	Snoop Dogg, "Fo' shizzle, my nizzle"
