= The Oncoming Storm =

Studio album by Unearth
- Released: June 29, 2004
- Studios: Zing Recording Studios, Westfield, Massachusetts
- Genre: Melodic metalcore
- Length: 40:36
- Label: Metal Blade
- Producer: Adam Dutkiewicz

Unearth chronology
Endless (2002)	The Oncoming Storm (2004)	Our Days of Eulogy (2005)

The Oncoming Storm is the second studio album by American metalcore band Unearth. It was released on June 29, 2004 through Metal Blade Records. The album was produced by Killswitch Engage guitarist Adam Dutkiewicz, and was their first major release through Metal Blade. This was also their first album with drummer Mike Justian and bassist John "Slo" Maggard, replacing Mike Rudberg and Chris "Rover" Rybicki respectively.

After its release, the album entered the Billboard album charts at number 105, selling 13,285 copies.

A special edition of the album was released on October 18, 2005. It contained two bonus tracks, and a DVD featuring live performances, backstage footage, interviews, an inside look to the recording of the album and four music videos.

== Background ==
In October of 2003, Unearth signed with Metal Blade Records. The band also shared that The Red Chord drummer Mike Justain would be joining the band for the upcoming Headbangers Ball tour to replace Mike Rudberg. In January 2004, the band shared that they were busy writing new material for an upcoming Metal Blade release; and that they would begin pre-production at guitarist Ken Susi's studio in several weeks before entering Zing Studios with producer/engineer Adam Dutkiewicz on February 9th. The band also shared that they would be filming for their upcoming DVD release at the Downtown in Farmingdale, NY on January 25th. In March, the band shared that their new album would be titled The Oncoming Storm and would be released on June 29.

When asked about the writing process from their debut album guitarist Ken Susi stated "On The Stings of Conscience, we really were a young band and we had forever to write it. We were just trying to voice our opinion and to make sure it was heard. This record we were more aware of what we were capable of so it made it quicker and easier to achieve that. The funny thing is about The Oncoming Storm is that it was written in about six months. It sounds really amazing for being put together in such a short period of time."

In late May of 2004, the band made the song "The Great Dividers" available for download via the website plastic-noise.com. The band also recorded a music video for the track the same month, directed by Dale Resteghini of Raging Nation Films, the video was shot in Spanish Harlem, NYC on May 21. Prior to the video's release, the band put out a call for extras to help them record. The band also released a music video for the track "Zombie Autopilot," directed by Greg Kaplan.

In April of 2005, the band entered the studio to record a video for the song "Endless," recorded at "The Showcase" in Corona, CA, directed by Jerry Clubb of Mental Suplex Productions.

In May of 2014, the band embarked on a 10th anniversary tour to honor the album, supported by Texas In July, Cruel Hands and Armed for Apocalypse.

On January 26, 2018, the album was re-released on vinyl in various EU and US exclusive colors.

The band began a 20th anniversary tour in the album's honor in June of 2024; alongside Bleeding Through, Overcast, Fuming Mouth, All Out War, High Command, and Apes.

== Critical reception ==
Professional ratings
Review scores
Source	Rating
AllMusic	3/5 stars
Exclaim!	negative
Kerrang!	4/5 stars
Lambgoat	8/10
Metal Storm	3.5/10
Metal.de	8/10
PunkNews	4.5/5 stars
Ultimate Guitar	10/10

Commercially, the album debuted at #105 on the Billboard Top 200, with 13,373 copies sold. Reception was mixed; with most reviewers pointing out that the album didn't advance the genre. But it also had its fair share of positive reviews and is viewed as a high point of melodic metalcore. Lambgoat stated “ Expect this to be one of those albums that every kid will be talking about for the rest of the summer.” Adding “this album is just heavy. Really, really heavy.” Alex Henderson writing for AllMusic stated “The Oncoming Storm is all about the thrill of pure, raw exhilaration as well as emotional catharsis; Phipps' nonstop screaming is very cathartic for Unearth and their fans in the mosh pit. The Oncoming Storm falls short of remarkable, but it's a noteworthy album. Writing for Exclaim!, author Greg Pratt praised McGrath and Susi's guitar work, but was underwhelmed by the release.

Ox-Fanzine praised the album’s production work stating "Boasting the best production in the band's history, UNEARTH power through eleven groove-laden monsters that finally rectify the band's biggest previous shortcoming: compositions that were once overly clunky and uninspired."

German reviewer Metal.de noted that the vocals don’t quite measure to Howard Jones of Killswitch Engage however he stated "there is absolutely nothing to fault with these eleven tracks. Instead, you should simply dive headlong into the mosh pit. And I’ll say it again: the fireworks display of bone-crushing riffs and intricate leads that the guitar duo unleashes here is phenomenal." Dave of PunkNews added "With The Oncoming Storm, Unearth proves there is still plenty of life in a diluted genre, and proof that metal/hardcore can put out some well-written, musically strong and fucking kick-ass records."

In 2020 it ranked at number 15 on Ultimate Guitar’s list of the 20 greatest metalcore albums of all time.

== Track listing ==
All lyrics are written by Trevor Phipps; all music is composed by Unearth.

No.	Title	Length
1.	"The Great Dividers"	4:02
2.	"Failure"	3:12
3.	"This Lying World"	4:17
4.	"Black Hearts Now Reign"	4:03
5.	"Zombie Autopilot"	4:10
6.	"Bloodlust of the Human Condition"	3:28
7.	"Lie to Purify"	3:41
8.	"Endless"	3:23
9.	"Aries"	2:40
10.	"Predetermined Sky"	4:05
11.	"False Idols"	3:43
Total length:		40:36

2005 reissue bonus tracks
No.	Title	Length
12.	"One Step Away"	3:18
13.	"The Charm"	3:13
Total length:		47:14

== Personnel ==
Production and performance credits are adapted from the album liner notes of the 2004 version.

Unearth

- Trevor Phipps – lead vocals
- Buz McGrath – lead guitar
- Ken Susi – rhythm guitar, backing vocals on "Endless", "Lie to Purify"
- John "Slo" Maggard – bass, backing vocals, piano, guitars on "Aries"
- Mike Justian – drums

Production

- Adam Dutkiewicz – production, engineering, mixing
- Alan Douches – mastering, CD enhancement
- Cory Kilduff – layout
- Matt Hayes – layout
- Aaron Marsh – layout
- Grail – photos

== Charts ==
Chart (2004)	Peak position
US Billboard 200	105
US Independent Albums (Billboard)	6
US Heatseekers Albums (Billboard)	1
