= Unearth =

American metalcore band

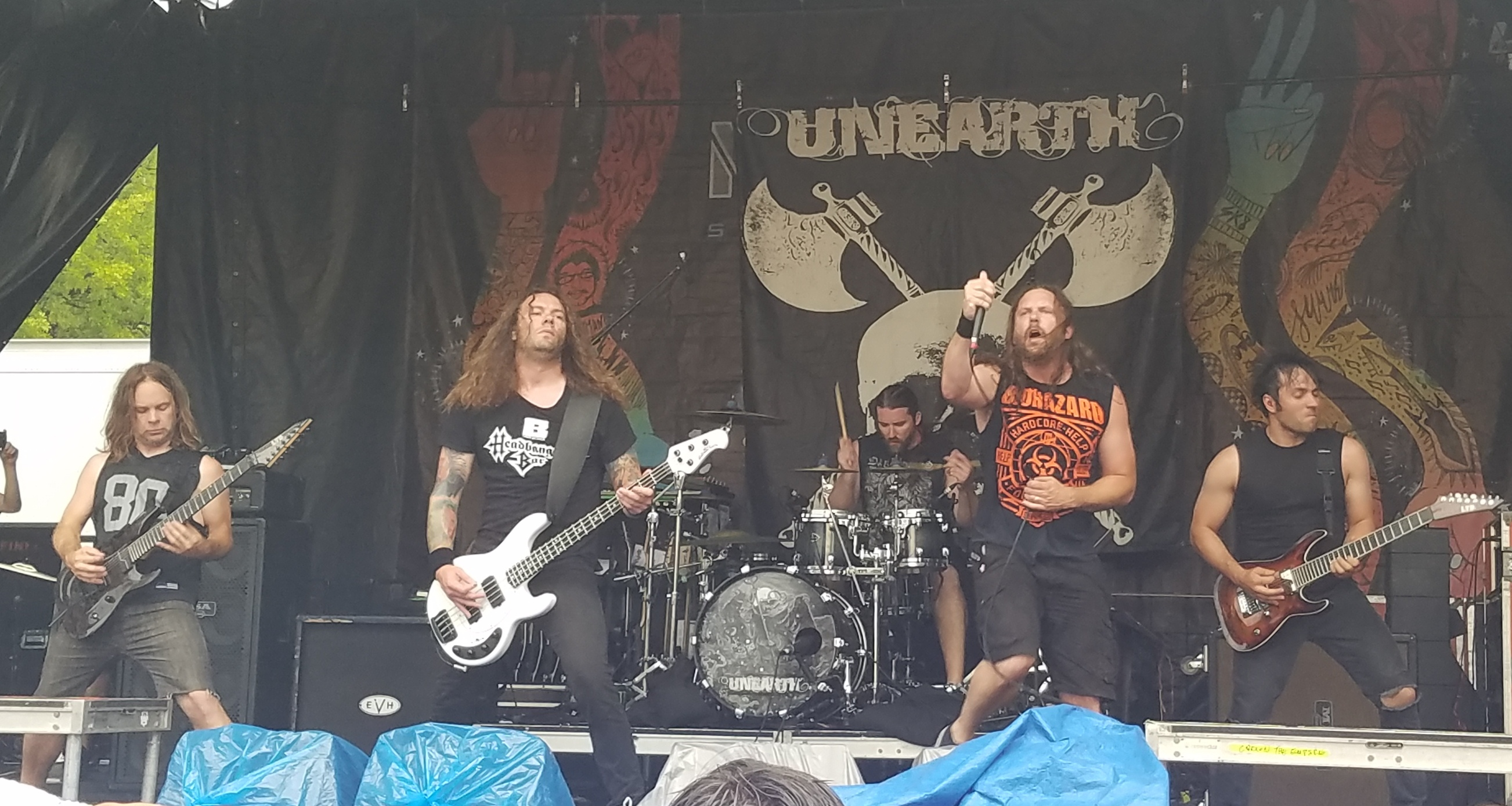
- Unearth in 2018

Background information
- Origin: Boston, Massachusetts, U.S.
- Genre: Melodic metalcore
- Years active: 1998–present
- Labels: Endless Fight; Eulogy; Metal Blade; Century Media; eOne Music; Howling Bull; 3Wise
- Members: Buz McGrath; Trevor Phipps; Chris O'Toole; Mike Justian; Peter Layman
- Past members: Ken Susi; Chris Rybicki; Mike Rudberg; Derek Kerswill; John Maggard; Nick Pierce
- Website: unearthofficial.com

Unearth is an American metalcore band formed in Boston, Massachusetts, in 1998. The group consists of lead guitarist Buz McGrath, vocalist Trevor Phipps, bassist Chris O'Toole, drummer Mike Justian and rhythm guitarist Peter Layman. They are currently signed to Metal Blade Records and have released eight studio albums. Their most recent studio album, The Wretched; the Ruinous, was released on May 5, 2023.

== History ==
=== Formation and The Stings of Conscience (1998–2002) ===
Unearth was formed by Buz McGrath, Mike Rudberg, Chris Rybicki and Ken Susi in Boston, Massachusetts in 1998. The band began as Point 04 (containing McGrath, Rudberg, and Rybicki), and Trevor Phipps was recruited soon afterwards. The band attempted to recruit Phipps while he recovered from appendicitis, but Phipps was reluctant to join. However, when Phipps showed up to a jam session for one of Susi's side bands, Unearth was practicing instead, and Phipps agreed to join after hearing the song "Shattered by the Sun." The name "Unearth" was coined by drummer Mike Rudberg as he wanted the band to "Unearth" a new sound in the metal and hardcore world. Quickly gaining traction in Boston alongside Overcast, Shadows Fall, and other popular Boston NWOAHM bands and given high praise in independent 'Zines, They went on a short Northeast US Tour with Since the Fall and other Metalcore pioneers Arranged By Steve Cossman.

On the small independent label, Endless Fight Records, they released their first EP called Above the Fall of Man in May 1999. Unearth then signed to Eulogy Recordings to release The Stings of Conscience in 2001, Guitar World dubbed the album "groundbreaking," writing that these "forefathers of metalcore" combined "melodic licks with aggressive riffing in a manner both striking and original." They then released the Endless EP in 2002. During the process of Endless, Chris Rybicki left the group and was first replaced by former Poison the Well bassist Andrew Abramowitz. After Abramowitz left, John Maggard came in.

=== The Oncoming Storm (2003–2005) ===
After playing tours and festivals like the New England Metal and Hardcore Festival with Unearth, Mike Rudberg departed from the group days after their performance at The SXSW in 2003, having performed the show in the nude. Also, Buz McGrath left for personal problems, but came back shortly after. The rest of Unearth would then use Tim Mycek of Sworn Enemy as temporary replacement drummer and Kia Eshghi of Rumi on lead guitar. Before McGrath returned, Mike Martin from All That Remains also filled in for him. After McGrath's return, Adam Dutkiewicz of Killswitch Engage also filled in on drums for the last two months of the year. In late 2003, they would later begin touring with Killswitch Engage, Shadows Fall, and Lamb of God for MTV's Headbangers Ball United States tour. On October 22, 2003, it was announced Unearth had signed with Metal Blade Records. In the spring of 2004, Unearth was one of the opening bands on the second MTV Headbangers ball tour, they played alongside groups like Hatebreed, Damageplan & Drowning Pool.

With Buz McGrath and new permanent drummer Mike Justian, of The Red Chord and previously post-hardcore band Hassan I Sabbah, Unearth released The Oncoming Storm through Metal Blade Records on June 29, 2004. The album became their first to make Billboard 200 debuting at 105, while also topping the US Heatseekers Chart. It was met with mixed but mostly positive reviews. That summer, they played at Ozzfest on the second stage. Unearth then went on tour once again in the Fall of 2004, this time as a headliner. Terror, The Black Dahlia Murder & Remembering Never all supported the band on that tour. In 2005, Unearth performed in the first ever Sounds of the Underground tour with numerous bands like Norma Jean, Gwar, and All That Remains. They also toured with Slipknot and As I Lay Dying in late 2005 in the United States.

=== III: In the Eyes of Fire (2006–2008) ===
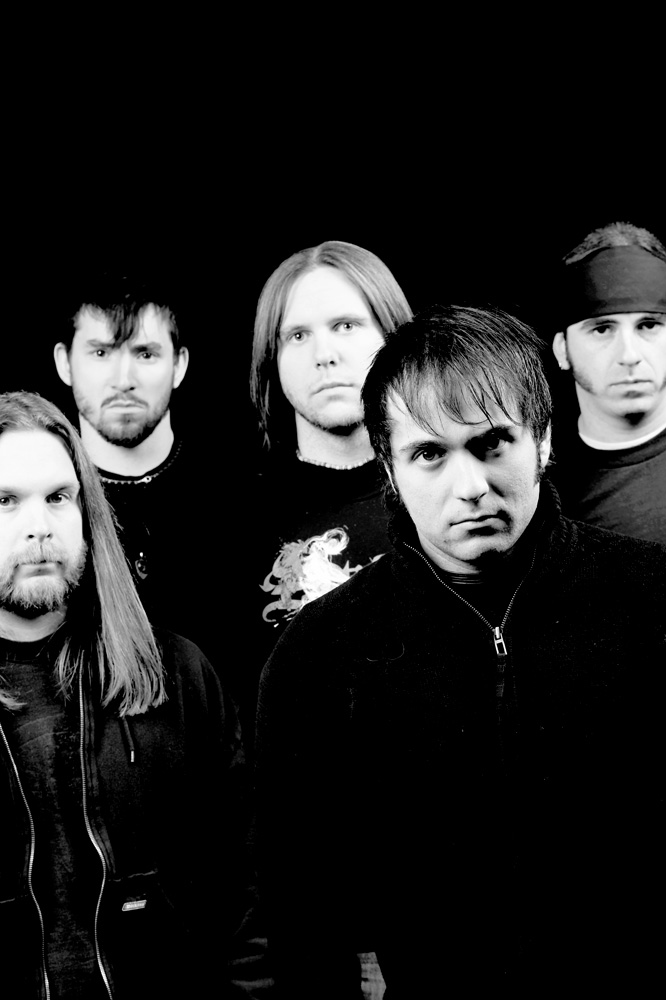
Unearth in 2006

In early 2006, they began writing their next album. After the writing process, they recorded III: In the Eyes of Fire with well-known heavy metal producer Terry Date in Seattle. This latest coup was yet another landmark in their blossoming career, a fact the band were quick to acknowledge: "Working with Terry Date is another amazing feat for us on a growing list of accomplishments". As they finished their latest album, they performed at Ozzfest for the second time, including songs from the album even though it was not destined for release until August 8, 2006. The album debuted at number 35 on the Billboard 200, and 2 on the US Indie Charts. Overall it was met with positive reception, Blabbermouth.net wrote "Unearth is an aggressive METAL band with chops and an ability to write memorable songs. "III: In the Eyes of Fire" is proof of it. During the release, they began their headlined Sanctity of Brothers tour with Bleeding Through, Animosity, Through the Eyes of the Dead and Terror. After participating in Japan's Loud Park festival, Unearth and Slayer toured together all around the U.S. in early 2007 on the Christ Illusion tour. They headlined a European tour in the beginning of 2007 with Job for a Cowboy, Despised Icon, and DÅÅTH, which was followed by a U.S. & Canadian tour with Dimmu Borgir, DevilDriver and Kataklysm that began in the middle of April. It was during this tour that drummer Mike Justian was fired from the band for numerous reasons. To fill in for the rest of the tour, Gene Hoglan of Strapping Young Lad was recruited. They played in the 2007 Download Festival with Seemless/Kingdom of Sorrow/studio drummer Derek Kerswill who then joined the band officially in 2008.

The band's live DVD Alive from the Apocalypse was released on March 18, 2008, and debuted at No. 13 on the Billboard Top Music Video Chart, with sales around 1,800. It was also certified gold in Canada a week after its release.

=== The March (2008–2010) ===
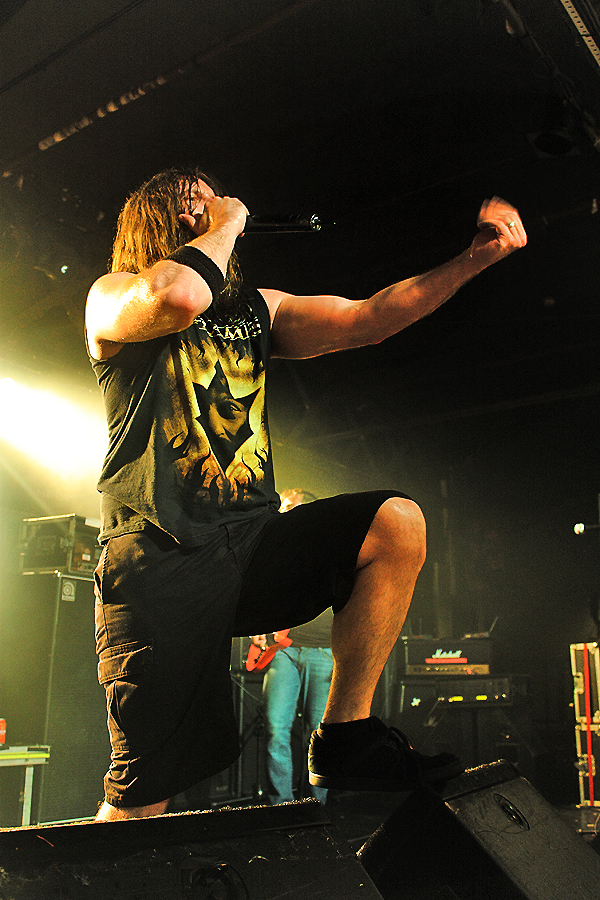
Unearth in Barcelona (2010)

On October 14, 2008, Unearth released their fourth album, The March. The album features a re-recorded version of the song "The Chosen", which they contributed to the album Aqua Teen Hunger Force Colon Movie Film for Theaters Colon the Soundtrack. The album debuted at number 45 on the Billboard 200, and was met with positive reviews. Exclaim! wrote, "The March is proof that this genre still has life left to give, reinforcing their rep as one of the greatest metalcore acts of the genre's lifetime." The band completed a tour with Gwen Stacy, The Acacia Strain, Whitechapel and Protest the Hero. They the completed the Never Say Die Club Tour with Parkway Drive, Architects, Despised Icon, Protest the Hero, Whitechapel and Carnifex. They also completed the Metal Hammer Defenders of the Faith tour with other acts such as Lamb of God, Dimmu Borgir and Five Finger Death Punch

As of early 2009, it was confirmed The March had sold more than 100,000 copies worldwide. In March 2010, Unearth confirmed they would play the Download Festival, opening the festival on the Maurice Jones Stage (formerly known as Main Stage) along with Killswitch Engage, 36 Crazyfists and Them Crooked Vultures. The band also held two separate Australian tours in both 2009 and 2010.

On September 20, 2010, it was announced former bassist Chris Rybicki was killed in a car accident caused by an intoxicated woman. He was 39 years old.

On October 25, 2010, Unearth issued a statement saying they and Derek Kerswill had amicably parted ways. The band stated there was no bad blood towards Kerswill, and that the situation was purely based on musical differences. Justin Foley filled in for drums for their new album.

Unearth completed a North American tour with As I Lay Dying, All That Remains and Carnifex, and headed to Europe for the ten-day "Persistence Tour" in December 2010.

=== Darkness in the Light (2011–2013) ===
In January 2011 the band entered the studio to work on their fifth studio album entitled Darkness in the Light, which was later released on July 5, 2011. The album was produced by Adam Dutkiewicz and drums were tracked by Justin Foley of KillSwitch Engage. On the Metal Injection LiveCast on Wednesday, April 13, Buz McGrath was the special guest. He discussed the new album and mentioned a possible release date. He mentioned that it was lead vocalist Trevor Phipps' best effort on all the Unearth albums. It debuted at number 72 on the Billboard 200, and once again the album received positive reception, with PopMatters stating "Darkness in the Light is the latest declaration of Unearth's greatness, and a sign that there is only more top-notch metal to come.

On January 31, 2011, the band was announced to be a part of the 2011 Mayhem Festival on the Jägermeister stage. Among the other bands billed for this tour were Disturbed, Godsmack, Megadeth, In Flames, Trivium, Suicide Silence, All Shall Perish, Kingdom of Sorrow, Red Fang and Machine Head.

At the begging on 2012 Unearth named Nick Pierce their new drummer. In the Fall of 2012 Unearth embarked on a Southeast Asia headlining tour, to close out the year they toured the U.S. with Born of Osiris and Wolves at the Gate.

In 2013, Unearth was a part of the Brothers of Brutality tour headlined by Whitechapel and Emmure. John did not perform this tour due to personal matters. Former Poison the Well bassist Iano Dovi and Chimaira guitarist Matt DeVries took over until his return. The band announced in April 2013 that they would be working with Mark Lewis to record their next album. Then on June 17, 2013, it was revealed that Unearth had signed with eOne Music for the albums North American release and Century Media for the European release.

=== Watchers of Rule and departure of John Maggard (2014–2016) ===
In mid 2014 the band embarked on a 10th anniversary tour for their album The Oncoming Storm playing it in its entirety. Support for the tour came from Texas in July, Cruel Hand and Armed for Apocalypse.

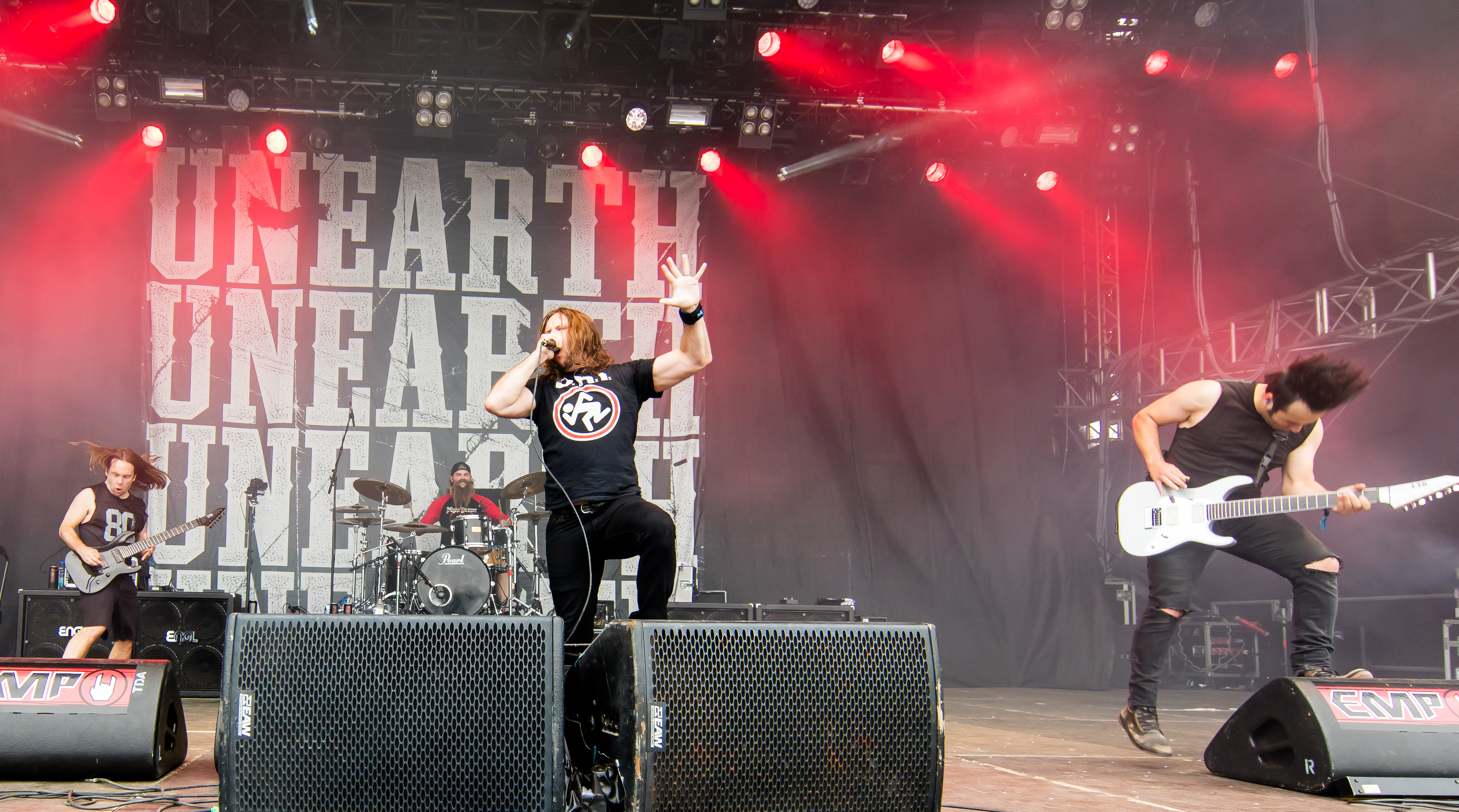
Performing at the 2016 Summer Breeze Festival, Germany

During fall 2014, Unearth released two tracks from their new album Watchers of Rule, which was later released on October 28, 2014, via eOne Music and features 11 tracks on the regular edition and 13 tracks on the deluxe version. The album debuted at number 105 on the Billboard 200 selling 3,950 copies in its first week.

In an interview with Noisefull, lead guitarist Buz McGrath revealed that the band currently has an open bass player position, confirming that John 'Slo' Maggard (who had been missing from touring for the last two years and did not contribute to Watchers of Rule) is no longer in the band. DeVries, who had performed live bass on all but one tour since the start of 2013, also chose to end his association with the band (and indeed stepped out of music altogether) at year's end, with Chris O'Toole being selected as a live fill-in afterward.

Unearth toured worldwide in support of the album first embarking on a US tour with Crowbar and Black Crown Initiate in December 2014. In May 2015 they played multiple headlining shows in Japan, Indonesia and Malaysia, in May they supported Arch Enemy on a European tour. In September and October of 2015 they held a US headlining tour with Wovenwar and finally they toured alongside Nile in Australia to finish the year.

In Spring 2016 Unearth headlined the fury tour which featured acts like Fit for an Autopsy, Reflections, Great American Ghost, Ringworm and Culture Killer. The band then supported Soilwork on their Fury Tour alongside Battlecross, Darkness Divided and Wovenwar. They also took part in the 2016 MTV Headbangers Ball Tour.

In 2017, Unearth did a small spring headliner with Fit for an Autopsy, Exalt and Darkness Divided.

=== Extinction(s) (2018–2022) ===
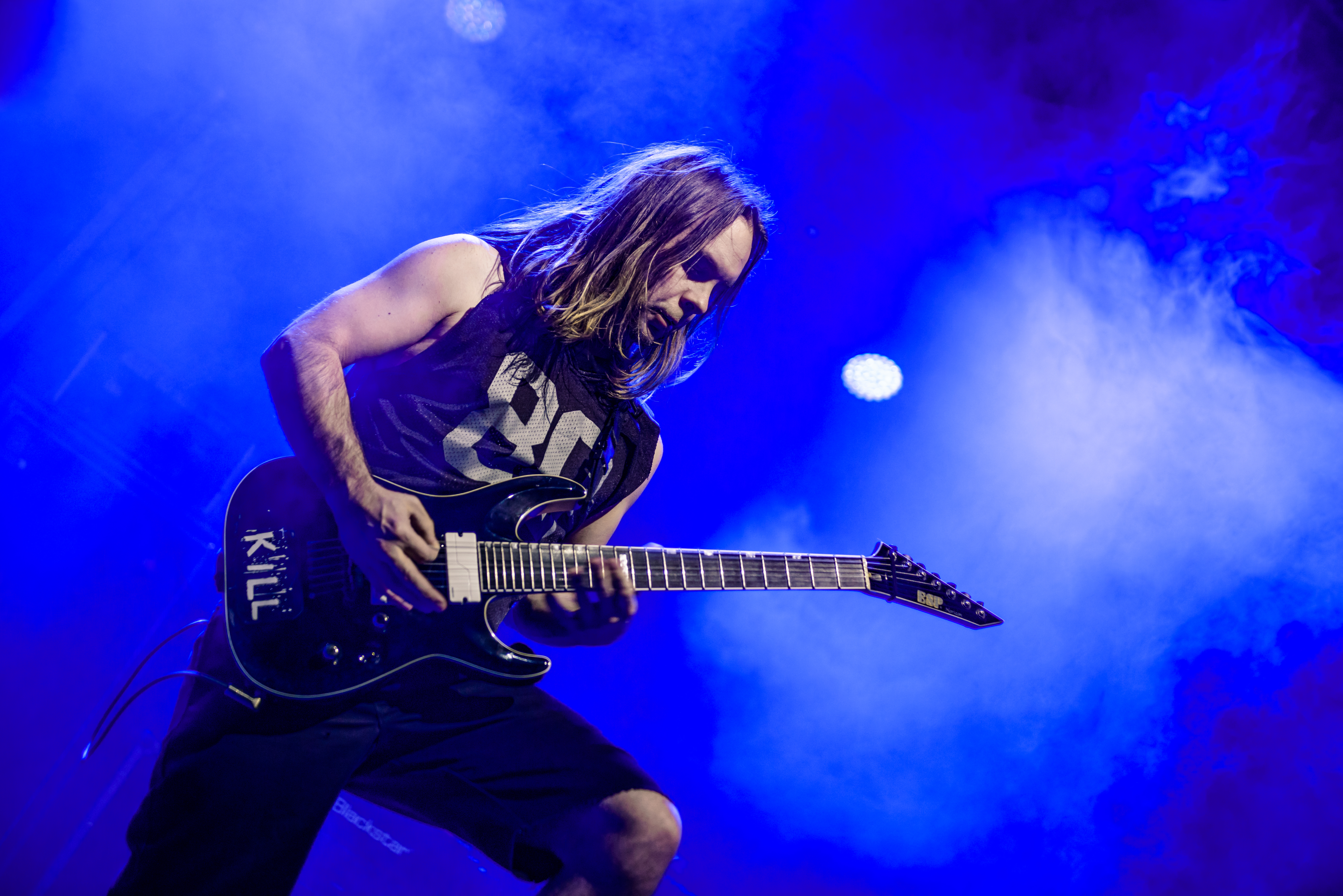
Unearth in Oberhausen Germany in 2016

In March 2018, Unearth announced that they would be playing the final touring portion of the Vans Warped Tour. They would be joined by bands like Every Time I Die, Motionless in White, Wage War, Chelsea Grin, Simple Plan, The Amity Affliction, Harm's Way and much more. That same month it was also announced the band had signed a worldwide deal with Century Media.

The first single off their newest album, Incinerate premiered on July 2, 2018. The album Extinction(s) was released on November 23. The album was met with favorable reviews with New Noise Magazine writing "The band presents a vast and engaging metallic sound while at the same time maintaining an important edge that never really lets up." and The Music dubbing it "one of the best metalcore releases of 2018." In support of the new album, the band went on a late 2018 tour with Fit for an Autopsy once again, The Agony Scene and Traitors joined as support.

In early 2019, Unearth co-headlined the "Death to False Metalcore Tour" with Darkest Hour. Misery Signals, Malevolence and Left Behind joined as support on the tour. Unearth supported Soulfly in February 2019 on the West Coast for their Ritual Tour. Unearth opened up for All That Remains on their Spring Headliner Tour. Big Story and The 9th Planet Out also joined up on the tour. Unearth opened up for Soulfly once again this year for the "Blood on the Streets" tour. Incite, Prison and Arrival of Autumn were all featured on the lineup. Unearth then did a co-headlining tour with Darkest Hour in December 2019 across the West Coast portion in the United States. Unearth then did a mini east coast run with Gwar as they supported them on their "Use Your Collusion" tour with Savage Master.

Unearth headlined a European tour in February 2020 alongside Prong, Dust Bolt and Sinaro. Unearth was supposed to headline a tour in Australia during the months of April and May that year with The Ascended, but the tour was postponed until further notice due to the COVID-19 pandemic.

Unearth was one of the bands to open up for Shadows Fall on their reunion show at the Palladium venue in Worcester, Massachusetts, alongside Darkest Hour, Within the Ruins, Sworn Enemy and Carnivora.

On June 2, 2022, the band announced they had parted ways with Nick Pierce and that former drummer Mike Justian had returned to the band. They also announced they were working on a new album. In October of 2022, founding guitarist Ken Susi revealed he would be taking a hiatus from the band and would not be featured on the album due to "differences in opinion." Peter Layman then began filling in for Susi during tours. Unearth opened up for Killswitch Engage on their Holidaze Rager 2 tour in December 2022. Rivers of Nihil and Lybica also joined up as supporting acts.

=== The Wretched; the Ruinous and departure of Ken Susi (2023–present) ===
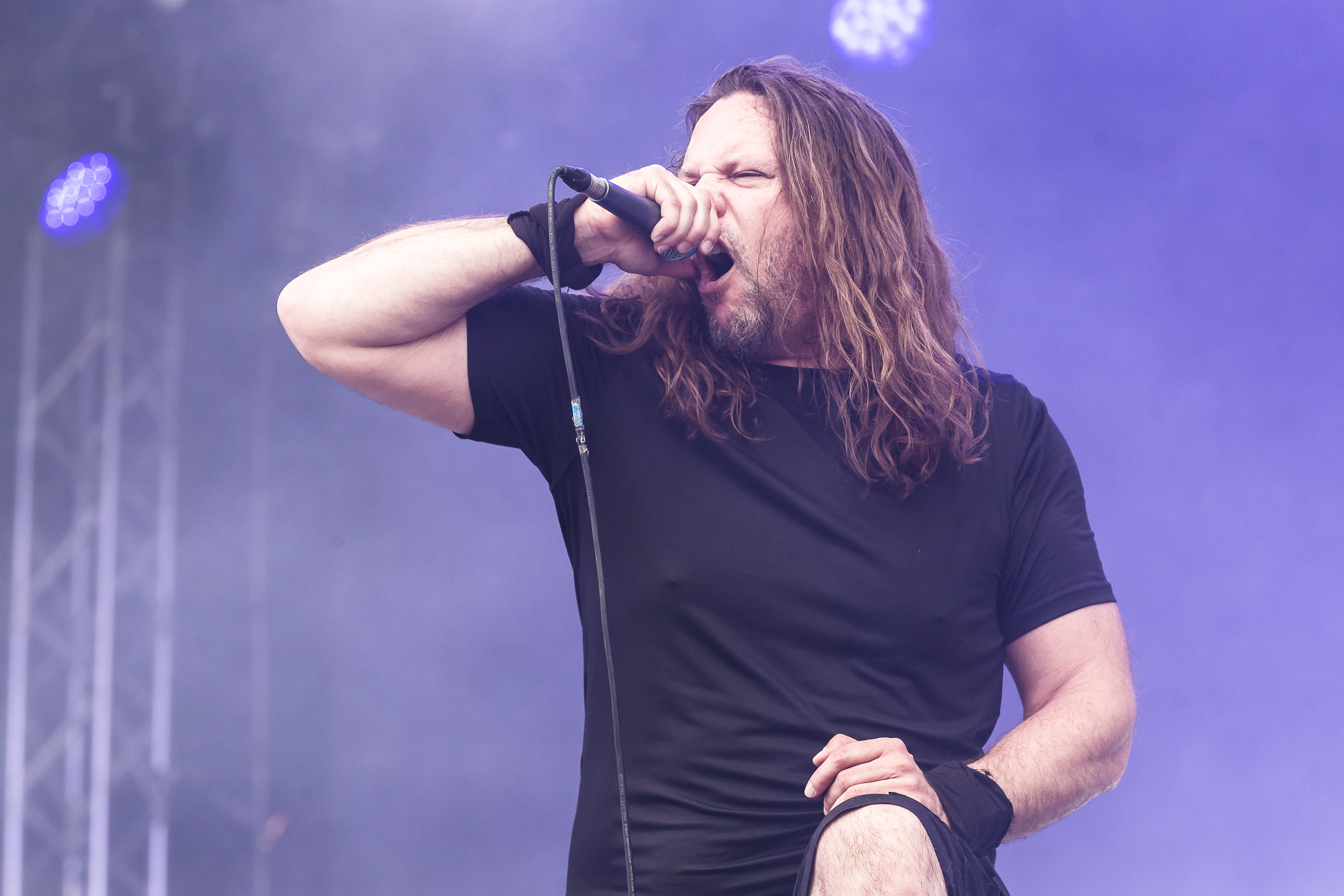
Trevor Phipps performing at Rockharz in 2024

In January 2023, Unearth performed several headlining shows all across many different countries like Japan, Australia and Taiwan. Unearth headlined a European tour in April 2023. Misery Index, Year of the Knife, Leach and Turbid North served as supporting acts.

On March 3, 2023, the band announced their eighth album, The Wretched; the Ruinous, would be released on May 5. The band also released a new single from the album, "Mother Betrayal", and also announced they had officially parted ways with Ken Susi after he took an extended hiatus from the band. Susi and Pierce would later go on to join As I Lay Dying later that year after they filled for Nick Hipa and Jordan Mancino respectively, Only for both guys to depart a year later in 2024.

The band began a 20th anniversary tour in honor of The Oncoming Storm in June of 2024; alongside Bleeding Through, Overcast, Fuming Mouth, All Out War, High Command, and Apes. On July 12, 2024, the band surprised released an EP titled Bask in the Blood of Our Demons. In the Spring of 2025 Unearth supported Machine Head on their North American tour. In late 2025 Unearth also served as a supporting act for Atreyu, during the tour the band played The Oncoming Storm in its entirety.

On March 5, 2026 it was announced the band had resigned with Metal Blade records. Trevor Phipps also revealed the band would be releasing a new album sometime in 2027. Unearth will be going on a European tour in the Summer of 2026 making both headlining and festival appearances.

== Musical style and influences ==
Unearth is usually described as a metalcore band, and unlike other artists who shun labels for fear of getting pigeonholed, Unearth has fully embraced the label. Though metalcore has gone through many different eras, Unearth has generally kept core elements of their style: technical riffs, melodic leads, aggressive vocals, hardcore-influenced breakdowns. In 2014, MetalSucks dubbed them the Slayer of metalcore noting that while many of their contemporaries either evolved or faded away Unearth stuck to their original sound. They stated "Unearth know what they do well, and they’ve stuck to it, unwavering. Unearth fans know what they’re getting with a new album." Unlike some metalcore bands that leaned heavily into growl-clean-chorus stereotypes, Unearth prioritized straightforward, hostile, pit-inducing riffage.

AllMusic described the band as the "American standard-bearers for a sound that combines European-style death metal, hardcore punk, melodic thrash, and machine-gun breakdowns."

In 2019 former guitarist Ken Susi commented on the bands early years and how they got their style stating:

We pulled our inspiration because we would play with bands like Shadows Fall, which was a very metal band, then on the same weekend, we'd play with a band like Hatebreed, so we needed our setlist to be heavy and also melodic. Buzz [McGrath, guitar] and I really were big fans of Iron Maiden and we were really big fans of New York hardcore and stuff like that, and we were definitely into shred guitar players like Paul Gilbert and Yngwie Malmsteen so we kind of fused all three of those together and made our own sound.

Their lyrics usually touch upon political/environmental issues, personal struggles, adversity, and the division within society. In a 2019 interview, lead singer Trevor Phipps stated that he's always been inspired by to write lyrics by what's going on around him.

Buz McGrath has stated that some of the bands core influences include In Flames, Metallica, Obituary, Crowbar, Iron Maiden and Hatebreed. He also claimed "You can definitely hear some of that Swedish metal in my songwriting, and then we just like to throw in big mosh riffs and just big parts." Ultimate Guitar wrote on the bands style stating "Unearth took everything they loved about Pantera, Slayer, Metallica and Earth Crisis, then smashed it into something perfectly cast for the new generation of metalcore."

== Legacy ==
Unearth is credited as a significant member of the New Wave of American Heavy Metal movement, being one of the "big four" bands of the movement, along with Lamb of God, Killswitch Engage and Shadows Fall. They are also credited with helping shape how metalcore sounded with melding hardcore, melodic death metal, thrash elements and breakdowns. They are viewed as a foundational band in melodic metalcore, helping set the blueprint for the genre. In 2014 OC Weekly dubbed Unearth the 6th best metalcore band of all time, that same year Ultimate Guitar ranked them the 8th best. Bands such as Rise to Remain, the Ghost Inside, Miss May I and Sable Hills have all named Unearth as an influence.

In a 2024 article by Justin Wearn of Lambgoat he dubbed Unearth underrated stating although Unearth played a huge role in 2000s metalcore, they never quite reached the same mainstream recognition as bands like Killswitch Engage, As I Lay Dying, or Trivium. He also credited the band for staying true to their sound instead of chasing trends like many other bands of the time were doing. On the subject of sticking to their sound Ken Susi stated "We've stuck to our roots. We're one of the only bands that have, and there's other bands who have been copying our sound for years who may be bigger. It's okay; it goes with the territory."

== Band members ==
Current

- Buz McGrath – lead guitar (1998–present)
- Trevor Phipps – lead vocals (1998–present)
- Chris O'Toole – bass, backing vocals (2014–present)
- Mike Justian – drums (2002–2007, 2022–present)
- Peter Layman – rhythm guitar, backing vocals (2023–present; touring member 2005, 2022–2023)

Former

- Ken Susi – rhythm guitar, backing vocals (1998–2023)
- Mike Rudberg – drums (1998–2002)
- Chris "Rover" Rybicki – bass (1998–2002; died 2010)
- John "Slo" Maggard – bass, backing vocals (2002–2012)
- Derek Kerswill – drums (2007–2010)
- Justin Foley – drums (2011–2012)
- Matt DeVries – bass, backing vocals (2012–2014)
- Nick Pierce – drums (touring 2011; 2012–2022)

Touring

- Andrew Abramowitz – bass (2001)
- Scott McDonald – guitar (2001)
- Timmy Thompson – drums (2002)
- Tim Mycek – drums (2003)
- Adam Dutkiewicz – drums (2003)
- Kia Eshghi – lead guitar (2003)
- Gene Hoglan – drums (2007)
- Mike Martin – lead guitar (2010)
- Iano Dovi – bass (2013)
- Doc Coyle – bass (2013)
- Jordan Mancino – drums (2016–2017)
- Mike Schleibaum – rhythm guitar (2019)
- Dylan Watson – drums (2026–present)

== Discography ==
- The Stings of Conscience (2001)
- The Oncoming Storm (2004)
- III: In the Eyes of Fire (2006)
- The March (2008)
- Darkness in the Light (2011)
- Watchers of Rule (2014)
- Extinction(s) (2018)
- The Wretched; the Ruinous (2023)

== Awards ==
Revolver Golden Gods Awards

Year	Work / nominee	Award	Result
2009	Unearth	My Space Readers Choice	Nominated

Loudwire Music Awards

Year	Work / nominee	Award	Result
2014	"The Swarm"	Death Match Hall of Fame	Won

Metalstorm Award

Year	Work / nominee	Award	Result
2018	Extinction(s)	The Best Hardcore / Metalcore / Deathcore	Nominated
