= The Stings of Conscience =

Studio album by Unearth
- Released: January 16, 2001
- Studio: Studio 13, Deerfield Beach, Florida, United States
- Genre: Metalcore
- Length: 40:28
- Label: Eulogy Recordings
- Producer: Adam Dutkiewicz; Jeremy Staska

Unearth chronology
Above the Fall of Man (1999)	The Stings of Conscience (2001)	Endless (2002)

Professional ratings
Review scores
Source	Rating
AllMusic	4.5/5 stars
Punknews.org	5/5 stars
Sputnikmusic	3/5

The Stings of Conscience is the debut studio album by American metalcore band Unearth, released in 2001. The album was produced by Adam Dutkiewicz of Killswitch Engage.

== Critical reception ==
Guitar World called the album "groundbreaking," writing that these "forefathers of metalcore" combined "melodic licks with aggressive riffing in a manner both striking and original."

== Track listing ==
No.	Title	Length
1.	"My Heart Bleeds No Longer"	3:36
2.	"One Step Away"	3:16
3.	"Fuel the Fire"	3:44
4.	"Only the People"	3:46
5.	"Stings of Conscience"	5:05
6.	"My Desire"	5:00
7.	"Vanishment"	3:47
8.	"Shattered by the Sun"	3:52
9.	"Monition"	4:58
10.	"Stronghold"	3:24
Total length:		40:28

== Personnel ==
Unearth

- Trevor Phipps - vocals
- Buz McGrath - lead guitar
- Ken Susi - rhythm guitar
- Chris "Rover" Rybicki - bass
- Mike Rudberg - drums

Other credits

- Cover Illustration by Samantha Hill
- Recorded in Westfield, Massachusetts in September 2000
