= Incarnate World Tour =

2016–2018 concert tour by Killswitch Engage

- World tour by Killswitch Engage
- Location: Asia; Europe; North America; Oceania
- Associated album: Incarnate
- Start date: March 11, 2016
- End date: March 4, 2018
- Legs: 11
- No. of shows: 156

Killswitch Engage concert chronology
- Summer Tour (2015); Incarnate World Tour (2016-2018); Fall Tour (2018)

The Incarnate World Tour was a concert tour by the American metalcore band Killswitch Engage, in support of their 2016 album Incarnate. The tour started in Las Vegas, Nevada in March of 2016, and concluded in March of 2018, in Portland, Maine. It total the tour lasted 156 dates, covering 17 countries.

== Overview ==
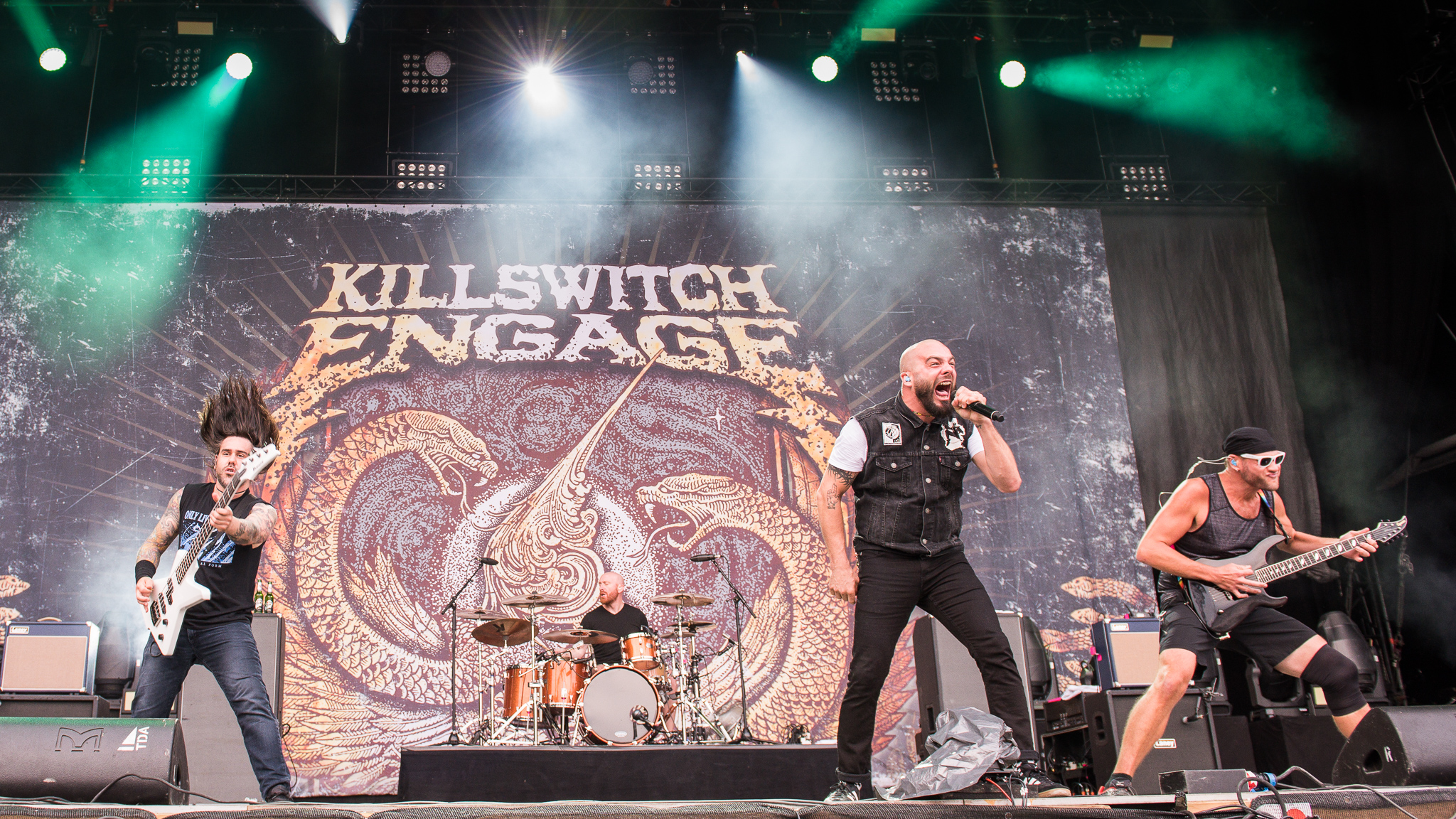
Killswitch Engage live during the Incarnate tour 2016

Killswitch Engage announced their 7th studio album Incarnate on January 19, 2016, along with the first North American leg of the tour in support of the album with Memphis May Fire and 36 Crazyfist serving as support. The tour officially began on March 11, 2016, at in Las Vegas, Nevada at the Hard Rock Cafe Radio Contraband Convention.

The first European leg of the tour took place in June of 2016, and seen the band make multiple festival appearances at Download Festival, Hellfest, Nova Rock Festival and both days of the Rock am Ring and Rock im Park festivals. During this leg they also added a few headling gigs with Architects and August Burns Red. On June 6, it was announced they would tour North America alongside Volbeat, this was followed by the tours only US leg with Avenged Sevenfold and Volbeat. This was followed by an appearance at Loud Park Festival Japan, and a separate appearance at Knotfest in Mexico. The group closed out 2016 on a second European leg with Bullet For My Valentine.

The tour continued into 2017, with an Australia / New Zealand headlining tour in March with Fallujah serving as support. Following this Killswitch Engage embarked on an extensive North American co headlining tour with Anthrax in the Spring. During the tour Anthrax frontman Joey Belladonna would often join the band onstage to sing their rendition of "Holy Diver." They then announced two Summer shows with All That Remains. Due to the success of the first run with Anthrax the two went on a second tour North American tour together in early 2018.

== Opening acts ==
=== 2016 ===
- Memphis May Fire all dates across North America leg I
- 36 Crazyfist all dates across North America leg I
- Architects European dates on June 7, June 8, June 13, June 14 and June 15
- August Burns Red European dates on June 7, June 8, June 13, June 14 and June 15
- Atreyu European dates on June 7, June 8, June 13, June 14 and June 15
- Bury Tomorrow European dates on June 7, June 8, June 13, June 14 and June 15

=== 2017 ===
- Fallujah all Australian and New Zealand dates
- All That Remains all US Summer shows
- The Devil Wears Prada all Anthrax co headlining shows
- Jasta all Anthrax co headlining shows from March 31 to April 9
- Code Orange all Anthrax co headlining shows from April 11 to May 7

=== 2018 ===
- Havok all Anthrax co headlining shows

== Setlist ==
The following set list was performed in Seattle, Washington, and is not intended to be representative of the majority of the shows on the tour.

1. "Strength of the Mind"
2. "A Bid Farewell"
3. "Fixation on the Darkness"
4. "Alone I Stand"
5. "Beyond the Flames"
6. "Just Barley Breathing"
7. "Take This Oath"
8. "Hate by Design"
9. "Vide Infra"
10. "Always"
11. "Just Let Go"
12. "Rose of Sharyn"
13. "Cut Me Loose"
14. "My Last Serenade"
15. "The End of Heartache"
16. "My Curse"
17. "In Due Time"

== Reception ==
Commenting on their performance in Holyoke, Massachusetts Masslive wrote "Making every effort to give concertgoers a reason to forget about technical difficulties plaguing nearly three hours of music, vocalist Jesse Leach and guitarist Adam Dutkiewicz would alternate between expressing adoration for the hometown crowd in unique ways while jumping across the band's entire catalogue, from 2002's "My Last Serenade," off "Alive or Just Breathing" to 2013's "Always," off "Disarm the Descent." Writing on their show in Auckland, New Zealand Libel Music wrote "this was a band that KNEW how to work the crowd, at times guitarists leaning out over the crowd, not just themselves but their guitars, so that fans could touch, and maybe even mess up a solo or two."

== Tour dates ==
Date	City	Country	Venue
North America leg I Supported by: Memphis May Fire and 36 Crazyfists
March 11, 2016	Las Vegas	US	Hard Rock Cafe
March 16, 2016	San Antonio	US	The Aztec Theater
March 18, 2016	Dallas	US	House of Blues
March 19, 2016	Kansas City	US	Uptown Theater
March 21, 2016	Nashville	US	Marathon Music Works
March 23, 2016	Indianapolis	US	Old National Centre
March 24, 2016	Clive	US	7 Flags
March 25, 2016	Minneapolis	US	Skyway Theatre
March 26, 2016	Milwaukee	US	The Rave
March 28, 2016	Lincoln	US	Bourbon Theater
March 30, 2016	Salt Lake City	US	The Complex
April 1, 2016	Seattle	US	Showbox SODO
April 2, 2016	Spokane	US	Knitting Factory Concert House
April 3, 2016	Vancouver	Canada	Vogue Theater
April 4, 2016	Portland	US	Roseland Theater
April 6, 2016	Boise	US	Knitting Factory Concert House
April 7, 2016	Sacramento	US	Ace of Spades
April 8, 2016	Pomona	US	Fox Theater Pomona
April 9, 2016	Tempe	US	The Marquee
April 11, 2016	Oklahoma City	US	Diamond Ballroom
April 12, 2016	Sauget	US	Pop’s Nightclub
April 14, 2016	Cleveland	US	House of Blues
April 15, 2016	Binghamton	US	Magic City Music House
April 17, 2016	Buffalo	US	Town Ballroom
April 19, 2016	London	Canada	London Music Hall
April 20, 2016	Grand Rapids	US	The Intersection
April 21, 2016	Cincinnati	US	Bogarts
April 22, 2016	Asheville	US	The Orange Peel
April 24, 2016	Ladson	US	WYBB RockFest
Europe headline and Festival Leg Support on headline dates by: Architects, August Burns Red, Atreyu, Bury Tomorrow
June 4, 2016	Mendig	Germany	Rock am Ring
June 5, 2016	Nuremberg	Germany	Rock Im Park
June 7, 2016	Hamburg	Germany	Große Freiheit 36
June 9, 2016	Interlaken	Switzerland	Greenfield Festival
June 10, 2016	Castle Donington	England	Download Festival
June 12, 2016	Nickelsdorf	Austria	Nova Rock
June 13, 2016	Ljubljana	Slovenia	Kino Šiška
June 14, 2016	Budapest	Hungary	Budapest Park
June 15, 2016	Milan	Italy	Alcatraz
June 17, 2016	Clisson	France	Hellfest
June 18, 2016	Dessel	Belgium	Graspop Metal Meeting
North American Leg II Supporting Volbeat w/ Black Wizard
July 17, 2016	Chicago	US	Chicago Open Air
August 6, 2016	Bangor	US	Rise Above Fest
August 7, 2016	Montreal	Canada	Heavy Montreal
August 8, 2016	Brooklyn	US	Coney Island Amphitheater
August 11, 2016	Pittsburgh	US	Stage AE
August 13, 2016	Columbus	US	Express Live
August 15, 2016	Tulsa	US	Brady Theater
August 16, 2016	Dallas	US	Bomb Factory
August 18, 2016	Springfield	US	Illinois State Fair
August 19, 2016	Omaha	US	Westfair Amphitheater
August 21, 2016	Madison	US	Expo Hall
August 23, 2016	Des Moines	US	7 Flags Event Center
August 24, 2016	Brookings	US	Swiftel Center
August 25, 2016	Fargo	US	Scheels Arena
August 27, 2016	Edmonton	Canada	Rexall
August 28, 2016	Regina	Canada	Evraz Place
August 30, 2016	Calgary	Canada	Grey Eagle Event Center
September 5, 2016	Seattle	US	WaMu Theater
September 6, 2016	Spokane	US	Star Theater at Spokane Arena
September 7, 2016	Boise	US	Taco Bell Arena
September 9, 2016	Salt Lake City	US	The Complex
US Leg I Supporting Avenge Sevenfold w/ Volbeat
September 10, 2016	Greenwood	United States	High Elevation Rock Festival
September 12, 2016	Bonner Springs	United States	Providence Medical Center Amphitheater
September 13, 2016	Chicago	United States	Riviera Theatre
September 14, 2016	Grand Rahpids	United States	Van Andel Arena
September 15, 2016	Toledo	United States	The Huntington Center
September 17, 2016	Mashantucket	United States	Revolution Rock Festival
September 18, 2016	Chester	United States	Rock Allegiance
September 20, 2016	Fort Wayne	United States	Allen County War Memorial Coliseum
September 21, 2016	Nashville	United States	Bridgestone Arena
Japan Leg I
October 9, 2016	Saitama	Japan	Loud Park Festival
Mexico Leg I
October 15, 2016	Toluca	Mexico	Knotfest
Europe Leg II with Bullet For My Valentine
November 7, 2016	Fribourg	Switzerland	Fri-Son
November 8, 2016	Zurich	Switzerland	Komplex 457
November 9, 2016	Malian	Italy	Alcatraz
November 11, 2016	Munich	Germany	Tonhalle München, Werksviertel Mitte
November 12, 2016	Leipzig	Germany	Haus Auensee
November 13, 2016	Vienna	Austria	Planet.tt Bank Austria Halle Gasometer
November 15, 2016	Ludwigsburg	Germany	MHP Arena Ludwigsburg
November 16, 2016	Wiesbaden	Germany	Kulturzentrum Schlachthof Wiesbaden
November 18, 2016	Bremen	Germany	Pier 2
November 19, 2016	Tilburg	Netherlands	Main Stage, Poppodium 013
November 20, 2016	Brussels	Belgium	Ancienne Belgique
November 22, 2016	Cologne	Germany	Palladium Köln
November 24, 2016	Newport	Wales	Newport Centre
November 25, 2016	Bournemouth	England	O2 Academy Bournemouth
November 27, 2016	Newcastle	England	O2 Academy Newcastle
November 28, 2016	Sheffield	England	O2 Academy Sheffield
November 30, 2016	Glasgow	Scotland	O2 Academy Glasgow
December 3, 2016	Manchester	England	Manchester Academy
December 4, 2016	Manchester	England	Manchester Academy
December 6, 2016	Birmingham	England	O2 Academy Birmingham
December 7, 2016	Birmingham	England	O2 Academy Birmingham
December 9, 2016	London	England	Brixton Academy
December 10, 2016	London	England	Brixton Academy
Australia / New Zealand Leg I Supported by: Fallujah
March 1, 2017	Auckland	New Zealand	Power Station
March 3, 2017	Sydney	Australia	Enmore Theater
March 4, 2017	Brisbane	Australia	Eatons Hill Hotel
March 5, 2017	Melbourne	Australia	170 Russell
March 7, 2017	Melbourne	Australia	170 Russell
March 8, 2017	Perth	Australia	Metro City
North American Leg III with Anthrax Supported by: The Devil Wears Prada
March 29, 2017	Montclair	United States	Wellmont Theatre
March 30, 2017	Columbus	United States	Express Live
March 31, 2017	Knoxville	United States	The International
April 1, 2017	Manistee	United States	Little River Casino
April 3, 2017	Silver Spring	United States	The Fillmore
April 4, 2017	Wallingford	United States	Oakdale Theater
April 5, 2017	Philadelphia	United States	Electric Factory
April 7, 2017	Grand Rapids	United States	Monroe Live
April 8, 2017	Detroit	United States	The Filmore
April 11, 2017	Raleigh	United States	Ritz Raleigh
April 12, 2017	Atlanta	United States	Tabernacle
April 13, 2017	Orlando	United States	House of Blues
April 15, 2017	Austin	United States	Grizzly Hall
April 17, 2017	Houston	United States	House of Blues
April 18, 2017	Dallas	United States	House of Blues
April 21, 2017	Las Vegas	United States	Las Rageous
April 22, 2017	Los Angeles	United States	The Wiltern
April 23, 2017	San Francisco	United States	The Fillmore
April 25, 2017	Seattle	United States	Showbox SoDo
April 26, 2017	Portland	United States	Roseland Theater
April 28, 2017	Denver	United States	The Fillmore
April 29, 2017	Omaha	United States	Sokol Auditorium and Underground
April 30, 2017	Kansas City	United States	The Midland
May 1, 2017	St. Louis	United States	The Pageant
May 3, 2017	Toronto	Canada	The Danforth Music Hall
May 5, 2017	Huntington	United States	The Paramount
May 6, 2017	Clifton Park	United States	Upstate Concert Hall
May 7, 2017	Boston	United States	House of Blues
US Summer Shows supported by All That Remains
June 22, 2017	Hampton Beach	United States	Hampton Beach Casino Ballroom
June 24, 2017	Holyoke	United States	Mountain Park
North American Leg with Anthrax III Supported by: Havok
January 25, 2018	Montreal	Canada	MTelus
January 26, 2018	London	Canada	London Music Hall
January 27, 2018	Stoudsburg	United States	Sherman Theater
January 28, 2018	Richmond	United States	The National
January 30, 2018	Tampa	United States	Janus Live
January 31, 2018	Charlotte	United States	The Fillmore Charlotte
February 2, 2018	Milwaukee	United States	Club Stage Eagles Ballroom
February 3, 2018	Indianapolis	United States	Egyptian Ballroom
February 5, 2018	Nashville	United States	Marathon Music Works
February 6, 2018	Birmingham	United States	Iron City Music Hall
February 8, 2018	Corpus Christi	United States	Concrete Street Music Hall
February 9, 2018	Lubbock	United States	Lonestar Pavilion
February 10, 2018	Oklahoma City	United States	The Criterion
February 11, 2018	Albuquerque	United States	El Rey. Theater
February 13, 2018	San Diego	United States	House of Blues
February 14, 2018	Anaheim	United States	House of Blues
February 16, 2018	Boise	United States	Revolution Concert House
February 17, 2018	Spokane	United States	Knitting Factory Concert House
February 19, 2018	Edmonton	Canada	The Ranch
February 20, 2018	Grand Prairie	United States	Bowes Event Center
February 21, 2018	Calagry	Canada	MacEwan Hall
February 23, 2018	Winnipeg	Canada	Burton Cummings Theater
February 24, 2018	Minneapolis	United States	Skyway Theater
February 25, 2018	Sioux City	United States	Anthem at Hard Rock Hotel & Casino
February 27, 2018	Joliet	United States	The Forge
March 1, 2018	Baltimore	United States	Rams Head Live
March 2, 2018	Rochester	United States	The Dome
March 3, 2018	Worcester	United States	Palladium
March 4, 2018	Portland	United States	State Theater

== Personnel ==
=== Killswitch Engage ===
- Jesse Leach – lead vocals
- Adam Dutkiewicz – lead guitar, backing vocals
- Joel Stroetzel – rhythm guitar
- Mike D'Antonio – bass
- Justin Foley – drums
