= Disarm the Descent World Tour =

Concert tour by Killswitch Engage

- World tour by Killswitch Engage
- Location: Asia; Europe; Latin America; North America; Oceania
- Associated album: Disarm the Descent
- Start date: April 8, 2013
- End date: November 1, 2014
- Legs: 10
- No. of shows: 166

Killswitch Engage concert chronology
- Alive or Just Breathing 10th anniversary tour (2012); Disarm the Descent World Tour (2013–2014); Summer Tour (2015)

The Disarm the Descent World Tour was a concert tour by the American metalcore band Killswitch Engage, in support of their 2013 album Disarm the Descent. The tour started in Amsterdam, Netherlands in April 2013, and concluded in November 2014, in Clifton Park, New York. It total the tour lasted 166 dates, covering 36 countries.

== Overview ==
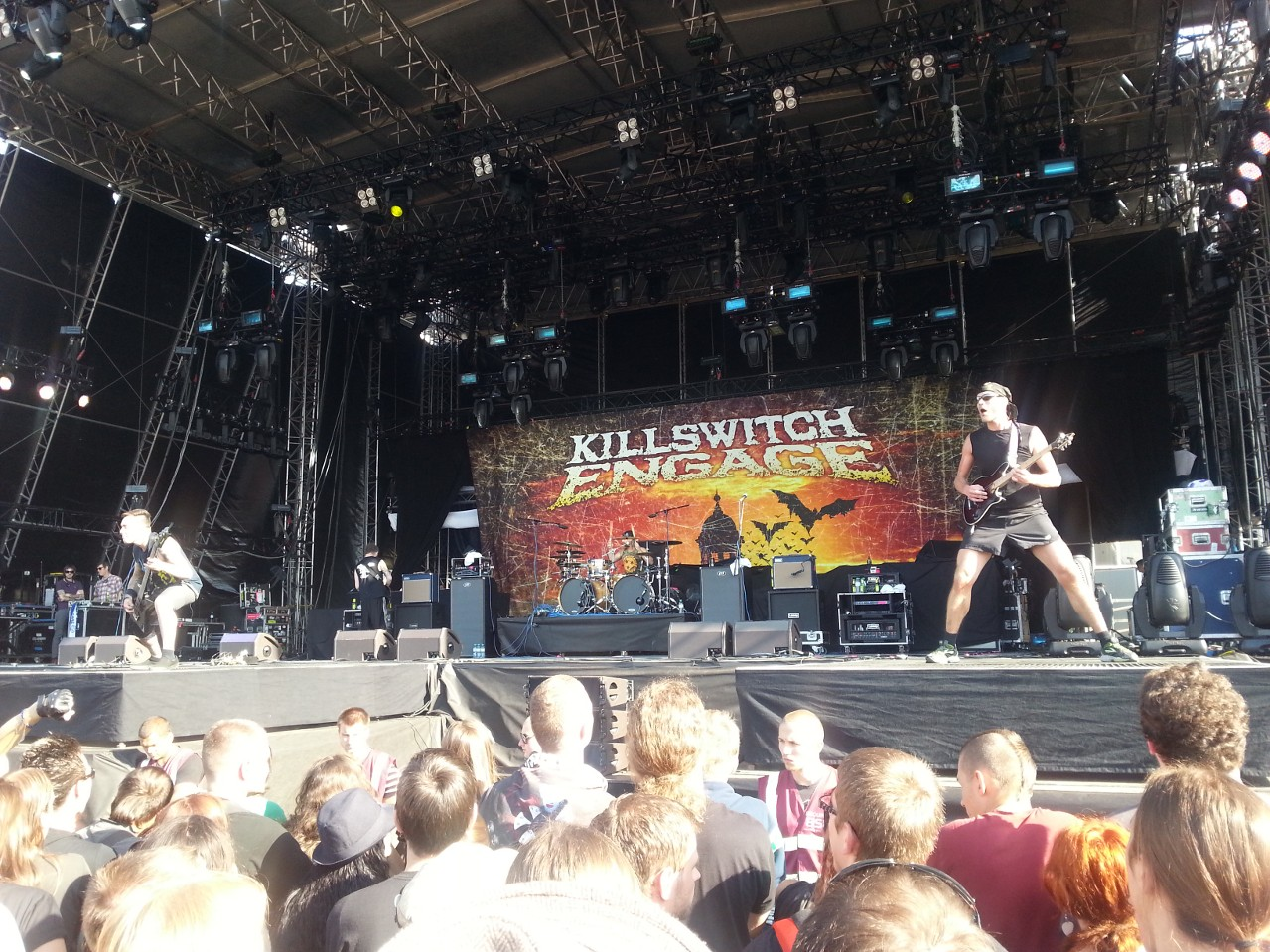
Killswitch Engage at Aerodrome festival 2013

Prior to Disarm the Descent release on April 2, 2013, Killswitch Engage took part in Soundwave Festival in Australia in late February into early March. In February the first headlining dates of the tour were announced for the Spring of 2013 in Europe and along with a dedicated UK run. On April 10, 2013 multiple North American dates were announced during the Summer of 2013. As I Lay Dying was originally supposed to be on the tour, as a supporting act but dropped out due to criminal charges against frontman Tim Lambesis. In late July and August Killswitch Engage played a short leg in Asian leg and took part in multiple European festivals. During this leg drummer Justin Foley sat out after breaking his collarbone in a bicycle accident. As I Lay Dying drummer Jordan Mancino filled in for Foley during all shows throughout the Summer. To close out 2013, it was announced on July 17, that they would go on another North American co-headlining tour with Lamb of God in the Fall.

To begin the 2014 part of the tour Killswitch Engage announced a mini UK / Ireland co-headlining tour with Trivium, for late January early February. This was followed by shows in Russia, Belarus and an appearance RAMfest in South Africa. In February they announced multiple dates for Japan and Australia which took place in April. Multiple US headline dates were announced for May and June along with festival appearances like Hardcore Fest. In August the grouped headlined 3 festivals including Dirtfest, and embarked on the first and only South American leg playing in countries such as Ecuador, Brazil and Argentina. To end the tour the band played a few headlining shows in October of 2014 and also appeared at Knotfest.

No official report ever came of the tour’s commercial performance however Billboard reported that the bands show at Iron City in Birmingham, Alabama on May 20, 2014 made $23,119 in gross ticket sales.

== Opening acts ==
=== 2013 ===
- Sylosis all dates across Europe
- Heartist all dates across Europe
- Miss I May all dates North American Summer shows
- Darkest Hour all dates North American Summer shows
- The Word Alive all dates North American Summer shows
- Affiance all dates North American Summer shows
- Testament all dates during Lamb of God North American co-headliner besides November 18
- Huntress all dates during Lamb of God North American co-headliner

=== 2014 ===
- Battle Cross all shows UK / Ireland, North American May headlining and South America
- Trivium all shows UK / Ireland dates and North American May headlining
- Kill Devil Hill all shows Australia
- Nothing More all shows North American May headlining
- Memphis May Fire all dates South America
- All That Remains US (October 30-November 1)
- Death Ray Vision US (October 30-November 1)

== Setlist ==
The following set list was performed in Philadelphia, Pennsylvania, and is not intended to be representative of the majority of the shows on the tour.

1. "A Bid Farewell"
2. "This is Absolution"
3. "The new Awakening"
4. "The Arms of Sorrow"
5. "This Fire Burns"
6. "Beyond the Flames"
7. "Rose of Sharyn"
8. "Rise Inside"
9. "Always"
10. "My Last Serenade"
11. "Turing Point"
12. "Fixation on the Darkness"
13. "In Due Time"
14. "The End of Heartache"
15. "My Curse"

== Tour dates ==
Date	City	Country	Venue
Europe leg 1 Supported by: Sylosis and Heartist
April 8, 2013	Amsterdam	Netherlands	Melkweg
April 9, 2013	Stuttgart	Germany	LKA Longhorn
April 10, 2013	Bochum	Germany	Matrix
April 11, 2013	Hannover	Germany	MusikZentrum
April 13, 2013	Malmo	Sweden	Kulturbolaget
April 14, 2013	Oslo	Norway	Rockefeller Music Hall
April 16, 2013	Helsinki	Finland	The Circus
April 17, 2013	Tallinn	Estonia	Rock Cafe
April 19, 2013	Stockholm	Sweden	Brewhouse
April 20, 2013	Copenhagen	Denmark	Amager Bio
April 21, 2013	Berlin	Germany	C Club
April 23, 2013	Munich	Germany	Theaterfabrik
April 24, 2013	Vienna	Austria	Arena
April 25, 2013	Milan	Italy	Magazzini Generali
April 26, 2013	Solothrun	Switzerland	Kofmehl
April 28, 2013	Meerhout	Belgium	Groezrock
April 29, 2013	Paris	France	Le Trabendo
April 30, 2013	Cologne	Germany	Essigfabrik
May 2, 2013	Manchester	England	HMV Ritz
May 3, 2013	Glasgow	Scotland	02 ABC
May 4, 2013	Birmingham	England	The Institute
May 5, 2013	London	England	Shepherds Bush
May 6, 2013	Cardiff	England	Souls at Cardiff University
North America supported by: Miss May I, Darkest Hour, The Word Alive and Affiance
May 30, 2013	Oklahoma City	US	Diamond Ballroom
May 31, 2013	Austin	US	Stubbs BBQ
June 1, 2013	Houston	US	House of Blues
June 3, 2013	Orlando	US	House of Blues
June 4, 2013	Fort Lauderdale	US	Revolution
June 6, 2013	Richmond	US	The National
June 7, 2013	Syracuse	US	F Shed at The Market
June 8, 2013	Hampton Beach	US	Hampton Beach Casino
June 9, 2013	Philadelphia	US	Trocadero
June 11, 2013	New York	US	Best Buy Theater
June 12, 2013	Silver Spring	US	Fillmore
June 14, 2013	Montebello	Canada	Montebello Marina
June 15, 2013	Guelph	Canada	Guelph Concert Theater
June 16, 2013	Grand Rapids	US	Intersection
June 17, 2013	Cincinnati	US	Bogarts
June 18, 2013	Sauget	US	Pops
June 20, 2013	Denver	US	Summit
June 21, 2013	Salt Lake City	US	Salt Air
June 22, 2013	Las Vegas	US	House of Blues
June 23, 2013	Phoenix	US	Marquee
June 25, 2013	San Francisco	US	Regency Grand
June 27, 2013	Vancouver	Canada	Commodore
June 28, 2013	Spokane	US	Knitting Factory
June 29, 2013	Billings	US	Shrine Auditorium
July 1, 2013	Fargo	US	The Venue
July 2, 2013	Omaha	US	Sokol Auditorium
July 3, 2013	Wichita	US	Cottilion
July 5, 2013	Milwaukee	US	Rave
July 6, 2013	Cleveland	US	House of Blues
July 7, 2013	Detroit	US	Crofoot
July 8, 2013	Joliet	US	Mojoes
Asian/Europe/South American Festivals
July 27, 2013	Yuzawa	Japan	Fuji Rock Festival
July 29, 2013	Bangkok	Thailand	Hollywood Awards Hall
July 31, 2013	Quezon City	Philippines	SM City North EDSA Skydome
August 3, 2013	Galicia	Spain	Resurrection Fest
August 4, 2013	London	England	The Garage
August 6, 2013	Nottingham	England	Rescue Rooms
August 7, 2013	Eindhoven	Netherlands	Dynamo Open Air
August 9, 2013	Gävle	Sweden	Getaway Rock Festival
August 10, 2013	Mikkeli	Finland	Jurassic Rock Festival
August 12, 2013	Frankfurt	Germany	Batschkapp
August 13, 2013	Nuremberg	Germany	Der Hirsch
August 14, 2013	Prague	Czech Republic	Výstaviště, Bruselská Cesta
August 16, 2013	Hasselt	Belgium	Pukkelpop
August 17, 2013	Hamburg	Germany	Elbriot Festival
August 18, 2013	Herford	Germany	X Open Air RockFest
October 12, 2013	New York City	US	Santos Party House
October 19, 2013	São Paulo	Brazil	Monsters Of Rock Festival
North American with Lamb of God Supported by: Testament and Huntress
October 22, 2013	Toronto	Canada	Kool Haus
October 23, 2013	Quebec City	Canada	Pavillion de la Jeunesse
October 24, 2013	Montreal	Canada	Metropolis
October 25, 2013	New York	US	Roseland Ballroom
October 26, 2013	Wallingford	US	Oakdale Theater
October 28, 2013	Columbus	US	LC Pavilion
October 29, 2013	Detroit	US	The Fillmore Detroit
October 30, 2013	Chicago	US	Congress Theater
November 1, 2013	Kansas City	US	The Midland
November 2, 2013	Grand Prairie	US	Verizon Theater
November 3, 2012	Socorro	US	Socorro Entertainment Center
November 5, 2013	Denver	US	The Fillmore Auditorium
November 7, 2013	Tempe	US	Marquee Theater
November 8, 2013	Los Angeles	US	Hollywood Palladium
November 9, 2013	Oakland	US	Fox Theater
November 11, 2013	Kent	US	ShoWare Center
November 12, 2013	Vancouver	Canada	Queen Elizabeth Center
November 14, 2013	Edmonton	Canada	Shaw Conference Center
November 15, 2013	Calgary	Canada	Big Four
November 16, 2013	Saskatoon	Canada	Saskatoon Praireland Park
November 18, 2013	Saint Paul	US	Myth
November 19, 2013	Milwaukee	US	Eagles Ballroom
November 20, 2013	Grand Rapids	US	Orbit Room
November 22, 2013	Sayreville	US	Starland Ballroom
November 23, 2013	Boston	US	House of Blues
November 24, 2013	Philadelphia	US	Electric Factory
November 25, 2013	Pittsburgh	US	Stage AE
November 26, 2013	Silver Spring	US	The Fillmore Silver Spring
UK/Ireland leg Supported by: Trivium, Miss I May ans Battlecross
January 29, 2014	Dublin	Ireland	The Academy
January 30, 2014	Belfast	Northern Ireland	The Limelight
February 1, 2014	Manchester	England	Manchester Academy
February 2, 2014	London	England	O2 Academy Brixton
February 3, 2014	Newcastle	England	O2 Academy Newcastle
February 4, 2014	Glasgow	Scotland	O2 Academy Glasgow
February 6, 2014	Birmingham	England	O2 Academy Birmingham
February 7, 2014	Southampton	England	O2 Guildhall Southampton
Russia/Belarus/South Africa Leg
February 28, 2014	Moscow	Russia	Volta Club
March 1, 2014	Saint Petersburg	Russia	Zal Ozhidaniya
March 3, 2014	Minsk	Belarus	Public
March 7, 2014	Cape Town	South Africa	RAMfest
March 8, 2014	Johannesburg	South Africa	RAMfest
March 29, 2014	Las Vegas	US	Extreme Thing Festival
Japan/Australia Leg Support by: Kill Devil Hill in Australia
April 2, 2014	Nagoya	Japan	Club Quattro
April 3, 2014	Osaka	Japan	Club Quattro
April 4, 2014	Fukuoka	Japan	Logos
April 6, 2014	Hiroshima	Japan	Club Quattro
April 7, 2014	Tokyo	Japan	Akasaka Blitz
April 11, 2014	Brisbane	Australia	Eatons Hill Hotel
April 12, 2014	Sydney	Australia	UNSW Roundhouse
April 13, 2014	Melbourne	Australia	The Palace
April 15, 2014	Adelaide	Australia	HQ
April 16, 2014	Perth	Australia	Metro City
US Headline and Festivals Leg Support on headline dates by: Trivium, Battlecross & Nothing More
May 1, 2014	Huntington	United States	The Paramount in Concert With Northwell
May 2, 2014	Virginia Beach	United States	Veterans United Home Loans Amphitheater
May 3, 2014	Concord	United States	Carolina Rebellion
May 4, 2014	Reading	United States	Reverb
May 5, 2014	Reading	United States	Reverb
May 15, 2014	Baltimore	United States	Rams Head Live
May 16, 2014	Columbus	United States	Rock on the Range
May 18, 2014	Buffalo	United States	Town Ballroom
May 20, 2014	Birmingham	United States	Iron City
May 22, 2014	Memphis	United States	Minglewood Hall
May 23, 2014	Pryor	United States	Rocklahoma
May 24, 2014	San Antonio	United States	River City Rockfest
May 25, 2014	Lubblock	United States	Lonestar Pavilion & Event Center
May 27, 2014	Albuquerque	United States	Sunshine Theater
May 28, 2014	Grand Junction	United States	Mesa Theater & Club
May 30, 2014	Council Buffs	United States	Westfair Amphitheater
May 31, 2014	Kansas City	United States	RockFest
June 1, 2014	Dallas	United States	Dos Equis Pavilion
June 13, 2014	Castle Donington	England	Download Festival
June 14, 2014	Castle Donington	England	Download Festival
June 28, 2014	Alix	Canada	Tail Creek Raceway
July 19, 2014	Providence	US	Lupo’s Heartbreak Hotel
July 20, 2014	Poughkeepsie	US	The Chance
July 22, 2014	Charlottesville	US	The Jefferson Theater
July 23, 2014	Winston Salem	US	Ziggy’s
July 24, 2014	Philadelphia		Electric Factory
US and South America Supported by: Memphis May Fire
August 8, 2014	Louisville	US	Expo Five
August 9, 2014	Birch Run	US	Dirtfest
August 10, 2014	Chicago	US	Impact Fuel Room
August 12, 2014	Guadalajara	Mexico	Teatro Estudio Cavaret
August 15, 2014	Quito	Ecuador	Centro de Arte Contemporaneo
August 16, 2014	Bogotá	Colombia	Rock Al Parque
August 19, 2014	Santiago	Chile	Teatro Caupolicán
August 20, 2014	Buenos Aires	Argentina	Vorterix
August 22, 2014	Curitiba	Brazil	The Music Hall
August 23, 2014	São Paulo	Brazil	Carioca Club
August 24, 2014	Rio de Janeiro	Brazil	Circo Voador
US Supported by: All That Remains and Death Ray Vision on non festival dates
October, 24, 2014	Kansas City	US	Arvest Bank Theatre at The Midland
October 25, 2014	Phoenix	US	Downtown Phoenix
October 26, 2014	San Bernardino	US	Knotfest
October 30, 2014	Sayreville	US	Starland Ballroom
October 31, 2014	Worcester	US	The Palladium
November 1, 2014	Clifton Park	US	Upstate Concert Hall

== Personnel ==
=== Killswitch Engage ===
- Jesse Leach – lead vocals
- Adam Dutkiewicz – lead guitar, backing vocals
- Joel Stroetzel – rhythm guitar
- Mike D'Antonio – bass
- Justin Foley – drums

=== Temporary replacements ===
- Jordan Mancino — drums (July 27 — August 18)
