= Donna Berzatto =

Fictional character, The Bear TV series

- Jamie Lee Curtis as Berzatto in "Bears"
- First appearance: "Fishes"; June 22, 2023
- Last appearance: "The Original Beef of Chicagoland"; June 25, 2026
- Created by: Christopher Storer
- Portrayed by: Jamie Lee Curtis

In-universe information
- Full name: Donna Berzatto
- Nicknames: DD; Double Dragon; Double D
- Occupation: Restaurant manager, real estate agent

Donna Berzatto is a fictional character on the FX Network television series The Bear. Created by Christopher Storer, Donna is a real-estate agent, a single mom, and troubled figure with apparent addiction and mental health issues that have impeded her relationships, particularly with her three biological children.

Donna has been played by Jamie Lee Curtis since her Emmy Award winning debut as a guest star in the season two episode "Fishes". Curtis reprised her role as Donna in further guest appearances in seasons three and four, before being promoted to a recurring role in season five.

== Biography ==
Donna, also known as Aunt DD, is the alcoholic, chain-smoking, mentally ill mother of Michael Berzatto (Jon Bernthal), Natalie Berzatto (Abby Elliott), and Carmen Berzatto (Jeremy Allen White). The father of the children, her unnamed ex-husband, disappeared from the family about 20 years before the action of the series. "Pop" Berzatto invested in the Original Beef of Chicagoland in the River North neighborhood of Chicago, with ambitions of becoming a prosperous restaurateur, but Donna "was eventually forced to take care of [the sandwich shop] before being replaced by Michael" but "never owns any share of the family business." After leaving the restaurant in the hands of Michael she seems to have later become a real estate agent.

Donna is, for the most part, "an oppressive presence, spoken about in hushed tones, the Babadook of the Berzattos." She is considered to be a "bringer of chaos." The actor who plays her is a "queen of horror movies." She was an unreliable and abusive mother to her kids, but her convivial spirit seems to have assured her a central role within the larger community, and she often hosted family events and holidays. She also informally adopted a neighborhood kid named Richie Jerimovich (Ebon Moss-Bachrach) and folded him into the family, seeing that he was fed and hosting his childhood birthday parties. In her partying days she enjoyed a type of whiskey cocktail called a 7-7. She got sober following the suicide of her firstborn son, Mikey, and is in recovery.

She lives in a two-story family home in the Chicago suburbs. Her adult son Michael was a resident of the family home until his death; her younger two children had long since moved out, one to college and one to work at a series of restaurants in Chicago, New York, California, and overseas. According to assistant costume designer Lariana Santiago, "One note from Christopher Storer that stuck with us was about dressing Donna like she had been rich for one year...The set design played into this, too, with the velvet bedspread and that leopard statue." Her house is decorated in 1980s style, with big wooden hutches and plastic-covered department-store-rococo couches; recurring motifs include black lacquer, Italiana, and felines. There is an oil painting of a nude woman over the mantel in her bedroom, and in the living room a portrait in pencil of her son Mikey and a family pet. Her leisure reading taste is revealed in piles of Jackie Collins and Danielle Steel novels. Donna's cookbook collection includes one of General Mills' Betty Crocker cookbooks and a Better Homes & Gardens cookbook, as well as Simply Delicious, "a collection of recipes from the employees of Herberger's," a now-defunct Midwestern department store chain. When asked about Donna's hair design and nails, show runner Christopher Storer sent Curtis photos of Monica Vitti and the "desperate housewives of New York."

Donna is played by Jamie Lee Curtis. Curtis won a guest star Emmy Award for her debut appearance on the show in the flashback Christmas episode "Fishes." In her Emmy acceptance speech, Curtis said, "You know there's a saying, 'Hurt people hurt people,' but I also think you can add to that and say, 'Helped people help people,' and I think that's the story of The Bear."

Donna's nicknames include DD, Double D, and Double Dragon. An empty pint glass is chilling in her fridge along with a whole chicken and Italian sausage. Donna was once in "an incident" at the Lincoln Park Zoo.

== Family ==
Donna mentioned a character named Gina when telling Mikey's birth story in the episode "Ice Chips": "Was I excited? You bet. I couldn't...I wanted a baby so bad. You know? I wanted someone to love me the way I had seen. You know, all those smug mothers down at the Jewel, blocking the aisle with their strollers. Do you know what Gina said to me. Gina fucking said to me...she looked down at my stomach...she says to me, 'You know, Donna, there are lots of good Chinese babies, honey.' I mean, can you imagine? Can you imagine she said that to me? The joke was on her, God rest her soul. I was two months gone with Michael at the time. Fucking bitch."

In "Ice Chips," Sugar said she did not remember her maternal grandmother, Donna's mother. Donna replied, "You don't want to."

In "Tonnato," Carmy visited his mother's house for the first time in years, and they looked at old pictures together. She pointed out Uncle Dan and Uncle John, but Carmy had no memory of them, and DD declared that they were "jagoffs." There was also an Aunt Carrie ("also a jagoff"), who Carmy did vaguely recall, when prompted with a photo.

== Reception ==
In 2025 The New Republic's Phillip Maciak described Curtis' character work as "gargantuan," and argued:

"Her debut performance in 'Fishes' is a genuine spectacle, a dark aria that’s hard to forget. But, despite bringing her back on a redemption tour for an episode each of these past two seasons, the camera is oddly ungenerous to her. Storer continues to shoot her in a way that almost fetishizes her wrinkles, her pancake makeup, her scarifying physicality. Bob Odenkirk doesn't look like that, nor Oliver Platt, nor even Rob Reiner. The show is so insistent on exploring the crevasses of Curtis' face, it makes you think it's searching for an insight. I'm not sure it has one."

The same year, Tara Ariano of Cracked wrote, "I appreciate that she attacks the role of a malignant, alcoholic narcissist without vanity...Even so: Curtis is overacting so hard that I'm sometimes concerned for her cardiovascular stamina...I would love to think that [Donna's sobriety] means a hypothetical season 5 might let her dial it down a notch or 40, but I don't."

== See also ==
- List of The Bear characters
- List of The Bear episodes
- Food of The Bear
- Music on The Bear
- Family on The Bear
- Bibliography of The Bear

== Sources ==
- Di Maio, Cristina (2025). "New Italian American Fathering in the Time of the Gig Economy: The Case of The Bear". Diasporic Italy Journal of the Italian American Studies Association. 5. University of Illinois Press: 105–121. doi:10.5406/27697738.05.1.08. ISSN 2769-772X.
