= List of Battlecross concert tours and performances =

Battlecross is an American heavy metal band from Canton, Michigan, United States, which formed in 2003. Since 2011 they have played numerous concerts and festivals.

== 2011 ==
=== Rose Funeral ===
In late 2011, Battlecross embarked on their first tour ever with American deathcore band Rose Funeral and thrash metal act Diamond Plate after playing a CMJ Music Marathon Showcase with Skeletonwitch and Turbid North in New York City. It was at this time that Jose Mangin of Liquid Metal noticed the band and began spinning 'Push Pull Destroy'. the band's first single, on the radio show's 'The Devil's Dozen' list of most requested metal tracks in North America. The single spent a total of 40 weeks on the charts.

== 2012 ==
=== Hate Eternal and Goatwhore ===
In early 2012, Battlecross replaced the band Fallujah on a tour with Hate Eternal and Goatwhore after Fallujah was involved in a van accident in Wyoming. It was at this time that 'Push Pull Destroy' hit #1 on the SiriusXM Liquid Metal charts and spent 5 weeks at #1 while the 2nd single 'Breaking You' was introduced into the countdown.

=== Occupation Domination Tour with Origin ===
Following a Metal Blade Records Showcase at SXSW in March 2012, the band was announced to open Occupation Domination, a full United States Tour with Headliners Origin and support bands Cattle Decapitation, Decrepit Birth and Rings of Saturn.

=== Metal Hammer's Trespass America Festival Tour ===
Although Battlecross was heavily rumored to join the 2012 Summer Slaughter Tour, In April, Battlecross was announced to be the opening band for the highly anticipated touring festival, Metal Hammer's "Trespass America Festival" headlined by Five Finger Death Punch with additional support from God Forbid, Emmure, Pop Evil, Trivium and Killswitch Engage. The Trespass America lasted from July 13 – August 28, 2012 and is credited to be the band's breakout performance as a crossover metal artist, appealing to both death metal and mainstream metal fans alike and contributing to the band's growing popularity across the world.

In Fall 2012, Battlecross followed up the Trespass America Festival tour with high-profile one-off performances, including: A Scion Metal Showcase with Six Feet Under, Cattle Decapitation and Gypsy Hawk in Pomona, CA, and a globally streamed Metal Blade Records 30th Anniversary/CD Release party with label mates As I Lay Dying in New York City, with the latter show streamed live across the world via partners LiveStream.

=== Heavy MTL ===
During the "Trespass America Festival", Battlecross appeared at the 2012 Heavy MTL festival in Montreal, Quebec and headlined the Apocalypse stage, playing against System of a Down who played on the festival's main stage.

=== Rockstar Energy Mayhem Cruise cancelled ===
During the summer of 2012, Battlecross was announced to be participating in the inaugural Rockstar Energy Mayhem Festival Cruise in December 2012, with Lamb of God, Anthrax, Suicide Silence, Hatebreed, Machine Head, and others. Due to Randy Blythe of Lamb of God's legal trouble in the Czech Republic and low ticket sales surrounding the uncertainty of Lamb of God's performance, the cruise was cancelled, but was heavily rumored to be a preview of the 2013 Rockstar Energy Mayhem tour line up for the following year.

=== Growing Pains with Abiotic ===
In December 2012, as Battlecross embarked on its first headlining tour, the Growing Pains Tour with label mates Abiotic as the support act.

== 2013 ==
=== Another Year, Another Tour with In Flames ===
In December 2012, it was announced that Battlecross would join Sweden's In Flames, Demon Hunter and All Shall Perish on a 30-date North American Another Year, Another Tour in early 2013.

=== Orion Music + More Festival with Metallica ===
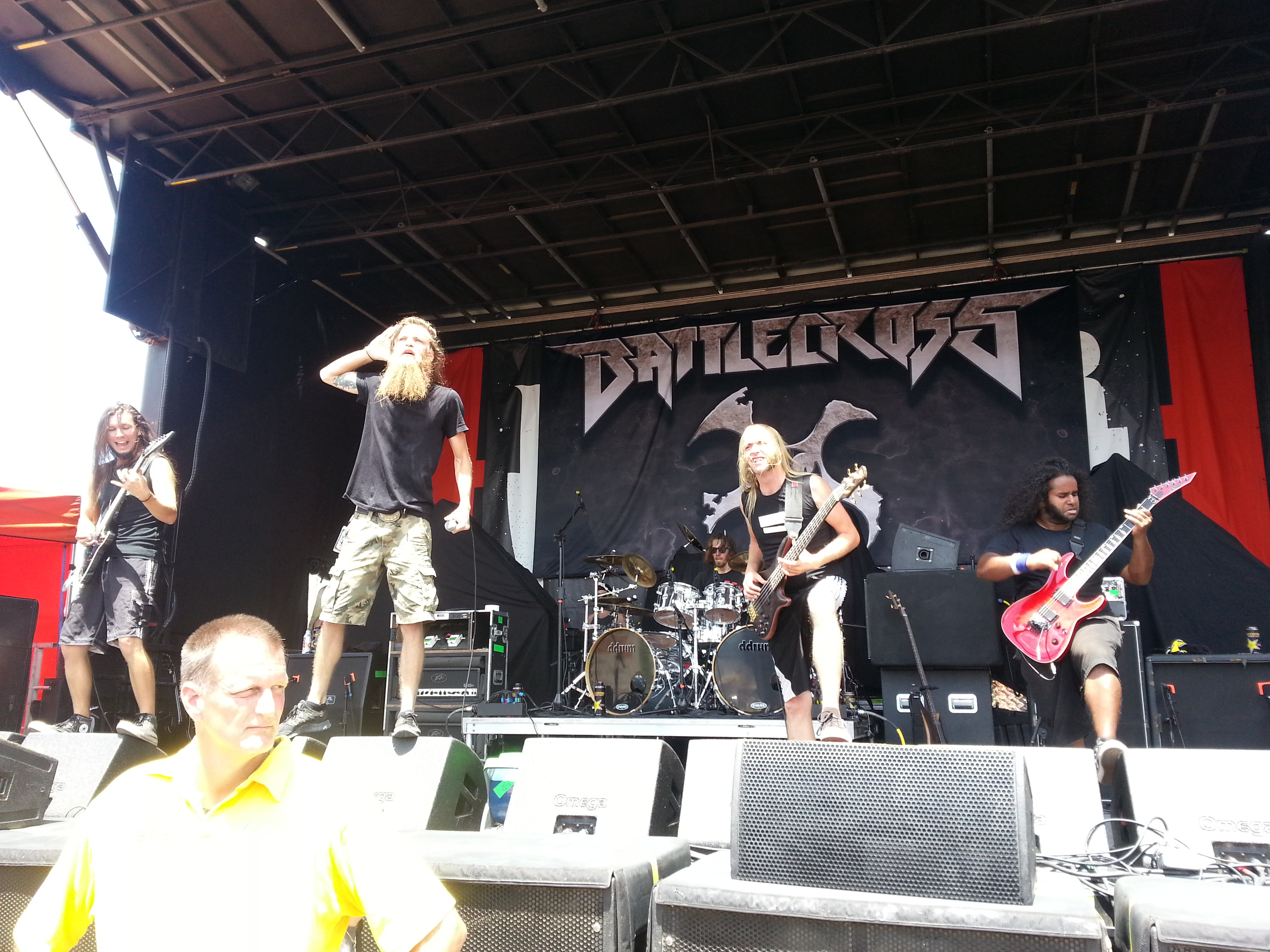
Battlecross performing at Mayhem Festival in Dallas, Texas with touring percussionist Kevin Talley of Dååth

In early 2013, Metallica announced that Detroit's own Battlecross would join the lineup for the 2013 Orion Music + More Festival, to be held at Belle Isle in Detroit, Michigan, on June 8 and 9. The band is scheduled to open for headliners Metallica, Red Hot Chili Peppers, Rise Against, Deftones, All Shall Perish and Bassnectar.

In early June 2013, Metallica invited Battlecross to appear on stage with them at the Festival's global press conference in the days prior to the event. Metallica's James Hetfield and Robert Trujillo were photographed hanging out with members of Battlecross prior to the band's stage time and also introduced the band at the onset of their performance on the Frantic Stage.

Billboard Magazine called Battlecross 'Breakout band of the Fest.'

=== Rockstar Energy Drink Mayhem Festival ===
Battlecross performed at the 2013 Rockstar Energy Drink Mayhem Festival headlined by Rob Zombie, Five Finger Death Punch, Mastodon and Amon Amarth.

Battlecross was lauded as one of the festival's stand-outs, earning live show reviews referencing the band as 'must-see' and 'best performance on the festival' by press outlets covering the festival.

The band became known for their philanthropy on the tour, regularly giving $1 of each 'War of Will' album sale, to charities in the local markets where they played, including Veteran's re-employment programs, the Boston One Fund and to the families of the firefighters killed in the Arizona Wildfires. Although the band demonstrated their commitment to community, the band was also known for encouraging an extreme form of moshing, called the wall of death during the song "Flesh and Bone". Fans from across America took to YouTube to debate which Mayhem Festival markets boasted the most 'brutal' Battlecross Wall of Death, with the press releasing compilations of the act for comparisons.

=== The Divinity Of Purpose Fall Tour 2013 ===
Hatebreed will be touring from late September until early October 2013 in support of their latest studio album The Divinity of Purpose along with Shadows Fall, The Acacia Strain and Battlecross.

=== Death Angel North American Tour 2013 ===
From late October until early November 2013, Death Angel will be performing with 3 Inches of Blood, Battlecross, Revocation and Diamond Plate to support The Dream Calls for Blood, their seventh studio album.

== 2014 ==
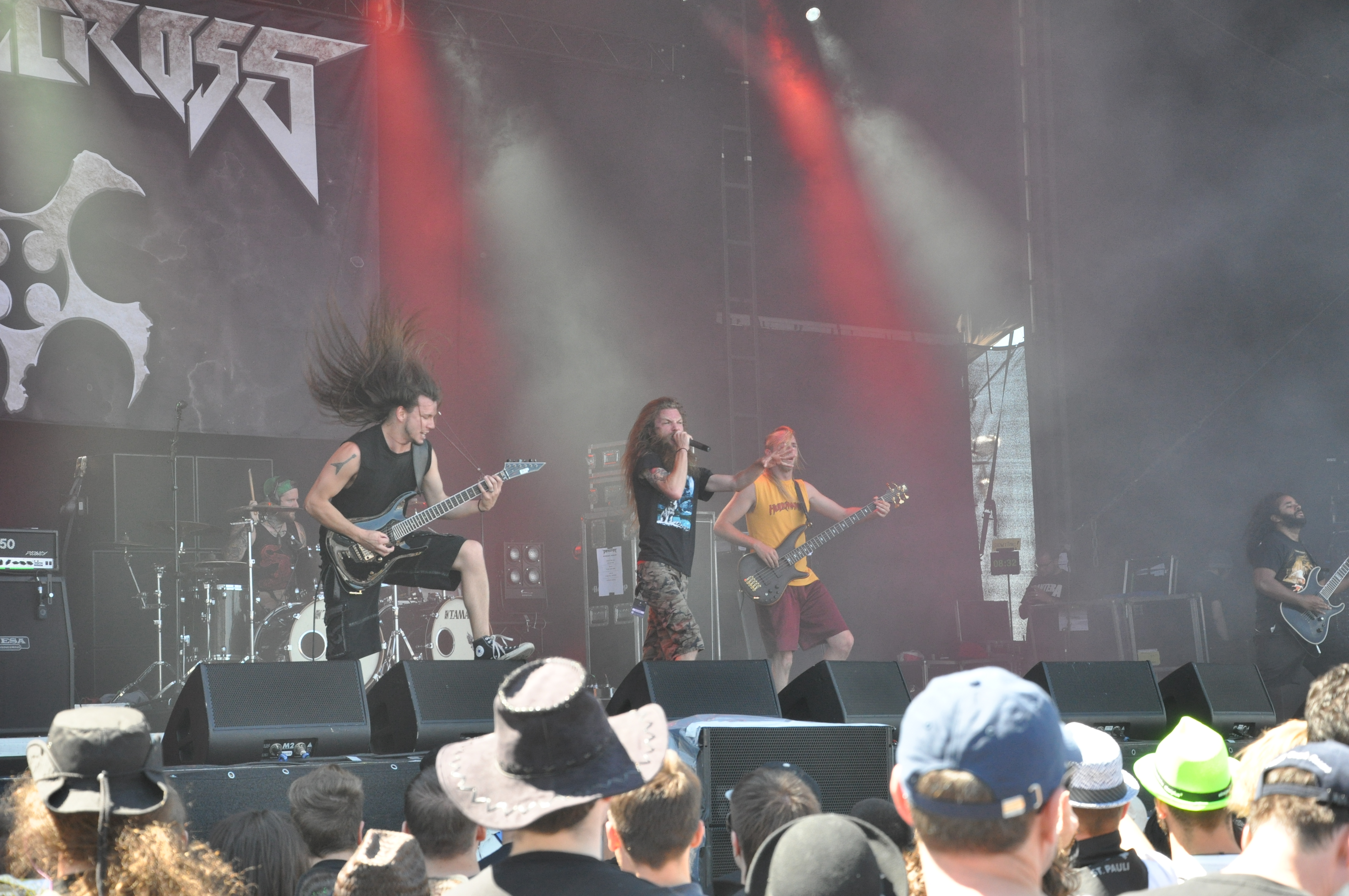
Battlecross at Rock am Ring 2014

=== Killswitch Engage World Tour 2014 w/ Trivium & Miss May I ===
In early 2014, Battlecross set off for their first overseas tour, opening up for Killswitch Engage, Trivium and Miss May I in the United Kingdom and Mainland Europe. Again, the band earned praise from the European press for a performance 'so full of confidence and conviction with metal anthems that belonged in venues of this size'.

It was also announced that Battlecross would continue the run in the U.S. later in the year, as a part of the Killswitch Engage Disarm the Descent World Tour. A dozen dates with Killswitch Engage alone or with Trivium announcing rotating direct support slots between Battlecross and Trivium in regional markets.

=== Protest The Hero Tour ===
In March 2014, Battlecross embarked on a six-week full U.S. tour providing direct support to Canadian progressive metal band, Protest The Hero and playing ahead of The Safety Fire, Intervals and Night Verses. Upon announcement of the tour, it was reported by the press and fans that the tour made 'no sense' with Battlecross being sandwiched between two progressive heavy metal acts, but the band's appearance proved to be a success by winning over progressive metal fans with their cross-over, energetic form of metal.

=== Graspop Metal Meeting 2014 ===
In June 2014, Battlecross has taken part in Graspop Metal Meeting in Flanders, Belgium.

=== Download Festival 2014 ===
On Saturday, June 14, 2014, Battlecross performed on the Red Bull Live Stage at the 2014 Download Festival in Donington Park, Leicestershire, England.

=== Replacement of Megadeth by Battlecross at 2014 Aerodrome Festivals ===
In May 2014, Megadeth announced their cancellation of all 2014 dates due to a family tragedy. Battlecross was named as their replacement at the 2014 Budapest Aerodrome Festival with the line-up consisting of Powerman 5000, Battlecross, Rob Zombie and headlined by Limp Bizkit.

== 2016 ==
=== Soilwork, Unearth and Winter Warrior tour ===
Battlecross embarked on a tour with bands Soilwork, Unearth, Wovenwar and Darkness Divided in October to mid November 2016. Then they began a headlining tour with Allegaeon and Necromancing the Stone as supporting acts. This subsequent tour was dubbed the Winter Warriors tour, which paid tribute to veterans.

== 2017 ==
=== Superjoint Tour ===
On April 21, Battlecross started an 11 date long tour with Superjoint and Child Bite. The tour conclude on May 10 in Denver. Both bands were touring in support of their current releases.
