= Tim Koch =

Tim Koch may refer to:

- Tim Koch (guitarist), member of Heartist
- Tim Koch, musician signed to Merck Records
