= Crowbar (disambiguation) =

A crowbar is a tool with a curved end used for prying objects apart.

Crowbar may also refer to:

- Digging bar, called a crowbar in the UK and Australia, a straight metal bar used for post hole digging or for leverage

== Music ==
- Crowbar (American band), a sludge metal band from Louisiana, who formed in 1990
  - Crowbar (album), the self-titled 1993 album by the American band
- Crowbar (Canadian band), a rock band from the 1970s, from Hamilton, Ontario
- The Crowbar, Brisbane, a music venue in Brisbane, Australia

== People ==
- Crowbar (wrestler) (born 1974), a ring name of professional wrestler Christopher Ford
- The nickname of one-legged BMX rider Kurt Yaeger

== Other uses ==
- Crowbar (circuit), a type of electrical circuit
- Crowbar (alcoholic beverage), a type of cocktail
- Crowbar (comics), a member of the DC Comics supervillain group The Cadre
- Crowbar, a weapon in 1998's Half-Life (video game)
