= As Daylight Dies =

Studio album by Killswitch Engage
- Released: November 21, 2006
- Recorded: June–September 2006
- Studios: Zing Studios (Westfield, Massachusetts); Long View Farm (North Brookfield, Massachusetts)
- Genre: Melodic metalcore
- Length: 43:39
- Label: Roadrunner
- Producers: Adam Dutkiewicz, Joel Stroetzel

Killswitch Engage chronology
The End of Heartache (2004)	As Daylight Dies (2006)	Killswitch Engage (2009)

Alternative cover
- Special edition cover

Singles from As Daylight Dies
- 1. "My Curse" Released: November 6, 2006; 2. "The Arms of Sorrow" Released: April 26, 2007; 3. "Holy Diver" Released: August 17, 2007; 4. "This Is Absolution" Released: October 20, 2008

As Daylight Dies is the fourth studio album by the American metalcore band Killswitch Engage. It was released on November 21, 2006 through Roadrunner Records. It was produced by the band's guitarists, Adam Dutkiewicz and Joel Stroetzel.

The album peaked at number 32 on the Billboard 200, selling up to 60,000 copies within its first week. A special edition version of the album was later released on August 28, 2007, featuring new cover art along with four B-sides and a DVD containing three music videos and behind-the-scenes footage.

It was supported by four singles, three of which, ("My Curse", "The Arms of Sorrow", and a cover of Dio’s "Holy Diver") all reached the U.S. Mainstream Rock chart.

== Background and recording ==
After taking part of the Taste of Chaos tour which ended around Thanksgiving 2005, the five members of Killswitch took a break from the band going in different directions. Guitarist and producer Adam Dutkiewicz produced an album for Underoath; vocalist Howard Jones managed various bands; bass player Mike D’Antonio worked on design projects, and recorded an album with Overcast, guitarist Joel Stroetzel got married and gave guitar lessons, while drummer Justin Foley contributed to the Drum Nation Volume 3 CD. By June 2006, the band had rekindled in Westfield, Massachusetts at Zing Studios, ready to write new material.

In an interview with the Aquarian Weekly D’Antonio commented on the writing process stating:

I almost felt like it should have been the record even between Alive Or Just Breathing and The End Of Heartache. It actually makes sense that this record would remind you more of Alive Or Just Breathing. The collaborative effort for this record was a lot like Alive Or Just Breathing, whereas The End Of Heartache was more of an Adam D. thing. Because we were all so burnt out from touring and playing in general, the only person who really came up with a lot of the stuff for that album was Adam. When we approached this record, it was back to basics. It had been three years since we did a record, and we were all really anxious to write. When it came time to step into that room and start writing, everyone had so many ideas it was almost too many, which was as good as you can possibly hope for.

Killswitch Engage’s previous albums saw the group use perfectionist tendencies. However, when it came to the recording of As Daylight Dies, Adam Dutkiewicz pushed the band to relax their perfectionist habits. Joel Stroetzel stated in an interview with Revolver "We weren’t as picky about getting everything as dead-on as last time, "The End of Heartache was a whole different thing. We'd double every guitar, and everything had to be perfectly in tune. But this time, Adam promoted attitude over perfection — and he promoted it with 40s! It was more like, Well, that’s pretty damn close! Good enough."

As a part of the more laid back approach to recording Dutkiewicz prompted the band to drink Malt liquor while recording the album. Stroetzel commented "There’s a little more rawness in there, but it’s not like it’s audibly sloppy, it was just about getting it to the point where it felt good. We weren’t drinking enough to get shitty — just enough to relax and not sweat it. When we were tracking the guitars and bass, we drank 87 40s." Lead singer Howard Jones was the only member that did partake in the drinking.

The albums cover art was officially revealed on September 7, 2006, it was created by bassist Mike D'Antonio.

== Music ==
The album continued the bands signature melodic metalcore sound, with songs like "My Curse" and "Arms of Sorrow" showcasing this duality of heavy verses built on screamed vocals and crushing riffs that lead into sweeping, melodic choruses. PopMatters stated "As Daylight Dies finds Killswitch — the poster boys of metalcore — finding their feet with their new singer, reading each other’s musical ambitions (as a record, it’s almost as ambitious as it is grandiose) and moving away from the lighter pastures that blessed End of Heartache and back towards the melodic death metal they were influenced by." The lyrics explore introspective and emotional themes with Jones combing personal emotion with universal messages.

Some of the material has drawn comparisons to sludge metal band Crowbar.

== Release and promotion ==
The album's first single, "My Curse", was released in 2006, and managed to peak at number 21 on the Billboard Rock Songs Chart. The radio edit strips down most of the track's unclean vocals, replacing them with Howard Jones' re-recorded clean vocals. A music video directed by Lex Halaby (who previously directed the live video for "A Bid Farewell") premiered on MTV 2's Headbangers Ball on November 3, 2006. The album's second single, "The Arms of Sorrow", was released in 2007, and peaked at number 30 on the Rock Songs Chart. A music video directed by Aggressive premiered on Headbangers Ball on May 1, 2007.

The album was released on November 13, 2006 through Roadrunner Records. It peaked at number 32 on the Billboard 200, selling up to 60,000 copies within its first week. It also peaked within the Rock, Hard Rock, and Digital Albums Charts. The album also reached the mainstream chart in several other countries, with its highest placement coming at number 29 in Australian. The album was certified Gold by the RIAA on June 30, 2009, which was on the same date of the release of its successor, Killswitch Engage. It has since gone on to sell more than 500,000 copies in the United States alone. The album was later certified platinum on November 23, 2021, by the Recording Industry Association of America (RIAA), indicating sales of 1,000,000 or more. It has also achieved gold certification in both Canada and the UK.

A special edition was released on August 28, 2007, including four B-sides and a DVD containing three music videos and behind-the-scenes footage. The album's B-side "Holy Diver", a Dio cover, was released as the album's third single on August 17, 2007. It peaked at number 12 on the Rock Songs Chart, making it the band's highest charting single. A music video directed by Brian Thompson premiered on the band's official Myspace page on August 1, 2007. The video is a comical re-imagining of the original video by Dio. A music video for the album's fourth single, "This Is Absolution", was released in 2008, featuring footage of the band performing the song live, as well as backstage footage. It also released the song "This Fire Burns" (listed in the album as simply "This Fire"), which was the theme song for WWE Judgment Day 2006 and later, the entrance music for professional wrestler CM Punk from 2006 to 2011. It was also used for two occasions by Randy Orton. The song had previously been released on the WWE Wreckless Intent album in May 2006.

== Touring ==
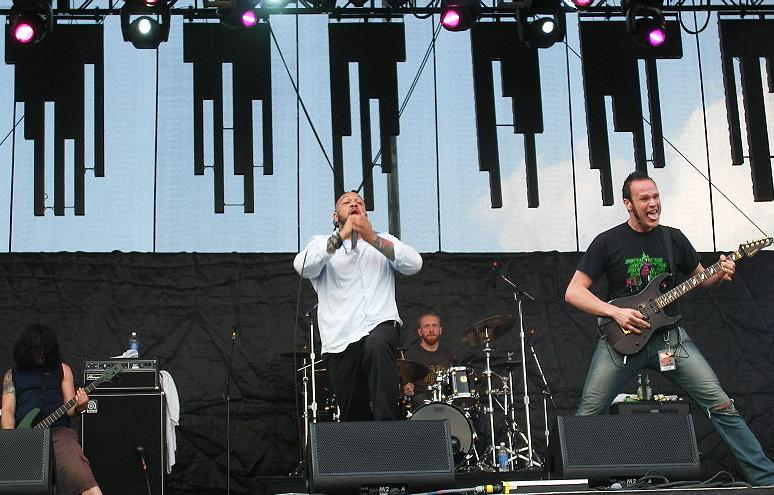
Killswitch Engage on the album’s supporting tour 2007

The first tour in support of the album took place in the US and began 12 days before the albums release on November 9, 2006, and went till December 20. Supporting acts included Shadows Fall, Bury Your Dead and 2Cents. Early in 2007, the band had to cancel three of its European tour dates with The Haunted due to Dutkiewicz's back problems. He required emergency back surgery and was replaced on the tour by Soilwork guitarist Peter Wichers. From late February to early April of that year the group headlined a US tour with DragonForce and Chimaira as supporting acts. During the Summer they took part in the Warped tour on August 6, 2007, Dutkiewicz was forced to leave the Warped Tour so he could fully recover from his back surgery and continue daily physical therapy. He was replaced by Killswitch's guitar technician Josh Mihlek for select songs, until his return on August 14, 2007. In October they toured Europe, then embarking on a US co headlining tour with Lamb of God in the Winter, along with another US headlining tour and an Australian leg in early 2008. In March they made their first appearance at Dubai Desert Rock Festival. The touring cycle continued with a US headlining tour in May of 2008, alongside Throwdown. They then finished the cycle with European festival appearances in June and July after which they began working on the follow up to As Daylight Dies.

== Critical reception ==
Professional ratings
Review scores
Source	Rating
About.com	4.5/5 stars
AllMusic	4.5/5 stars
Ultimate Guitar	9.5/10
Exclaim!	Positive
Drowned in Sound	9/10
Melodic	4.5/5 stars
MusicOMH	5/5 stars
Spin	4/5 stars
Sputnikmusic	3.5/5
Stylus Magazine	B

Widely regarded as one of Killswitch Engage’s best works, As Daylight Dies helped push metalcore into the mainstream in the mid-2000s, while also helping make the group into even more of a household name.

The album has received generally positive reviews from contemporary music critics. Thom Jurek of AllMusic praised the album, scoring it a four-and-a-half out of five and commenting, "If the cynics don't get it by now, they never will. For the rest, this is the album to come into the tent with." The tracks "This Is Absolution", "Unbroken", and "Eye of the Storm" were indicated as the AMG Track Picks. Raziq Rauf of Drowned in Sound also praised the album, scoring it a nine out of ten and saying, "With As Daylight Dies, Killswitch Engage have cemented their position as the reason for metalcore ever existing."

Ultimate Guitar gave the album heavy praise stating "This is the best Killswitch Engage album to date. The guitars are intricate and soaring, the drums are pummeling, and the vocals are angelic. A listener will be hard pressed to find too many things wrong with this album. It's written and performed like too well. Adding "No fan of metal should be without this album." MusicOMH praised the album's writing claiming "Howard Jones managed to not only match both his predecessors' commitment to genuinely impressive vocal range but also displays an equally authentic lyrical depth." Kaj Roth of Melodic.net wrote "this is their most melodic and strongest album up to date." "The compact sound is still there but now with less faster tracks and greater choruses where singer Howard Jones gets to show his fantastic range." Mike of Sputnikmusic added "With As Daylight Dies, the metalcore band places a great deal of emphasis on both melody and aggression to make up the sound, and does a fairly good job moulding the two musical themes together." Max Deneau of Exclaim! wrote "As Daylight Dies stands as the years finest metalcore record, and will likely be remembered as Killswitchs defining statement for years to come." Adding "Howard Jones, vocal performance here is nothing short of mesmerizing."

At the 2007 Boston Music Awards Killswitch Engage won Outstanding Metal/Hardcore Band of the Year and Act of the Year. As Daylight Dies was also nominated for Album of the Year (Major).

Brandon Tadday of Overdrive Magazine described the album as "without a doubt one of the most impactful releases for melodic metalcore during the mid-2000s". In 2026 Revolver Magazine included the album on their list of 13 great albums from 2006.

== Track listing ==
All lyrics are written by Howard Jones; all music is composed by Killswitch Engage.

No.	Title	Length
1.	"Daylight Dies"	4:05
2.	"This Is Absolution"	3:34
3.	"The Arms of Sorrow"	3:44
4.	"Unbroken"	3:08
5.	"My Curse"	4:04
6.	"For You"	4:03
7.	"Still Beats Your Name"	3:19
8.	"Eye of the Storm"	3:56
9.	"Break the Silence"	4:32
10.	"Desperate Times"	4:25
11.	"Reject Yourself"	4:45
Total length:		43:39

Best Buy exclusive live bonus tracks (taken from (Set This) World Ablaze)
No.	Title	Length
12.	"My Last Serenade"	3:24
13.	"The End of Heartache"	4:48
14.	"When Darkness Falls"	3:47

Special edition bonus tracks
No.	Title	Length
12.	"Be One"	3:31
13.	"Let the Bridges Burn"	4:29
14.	"This Fire Burns" (Originally for the WWE Wreckless Intent album)	3:09
15.	"Holy Diver" (Dio cover; originally for Kerrang!'s High Voltage!: A Brief History of Rock compilation)	4:10

=== Special edition DVD ===
1. "My Curse" (video)
2. "The Arms of Sorrow" (video)
3. "Holy Diver" (video)
4. Making-of videos for "My Curse" and "The Arms of Sorrow"

== Personnel ==
Killswitch Engage

- Howard Jones – lead vocals
- Adam Dutkiewicz – lead guitar, co-lead vocals, keyboards
- Joel Stroetzel – rhythm guitar, backing vocals
- Mike D'Antonio – bass
- Justin Foley – drums

Production

- Adam Dutkiewicz – production, engineering, mixing
- Ian Neill – assistant engineer at Long View Farm, North Brookfield, Massachusetts
- Ted Jensen – mastering at Sterling Sound, New York City
- Mike D'Antonio – digital design, artwork photography, layout design
- Daragh McDonagh – group photography

Management

- Vaughn Lewis and Kenny Gabor for Strong Management
- Tom Cavanaugh and Chuck Mihlek – road crew
- Mike Gitter – A&R
- Mark Scribner – business management at PS Business Management
- Tim Borror – U.S. booking at The Agency Group
- Paul Ryan – international booking at The Agency Group

== Charts ==
=== Weekly charts ===
Chart (2006–2007)	Peak Position
Australian Albums (ARIA)	29
Austrian Albums (Ö3 Austria)	68
German Albums (Offizielle Top 100)	62
Japanese Albums (Oricon)	43
Scottish Albums (Official Charts)	58
UK Albums (Official Charts)	64
UK Rock & Metal Albums (Official Charts)	3
US Billboard 200	32
US Top Rock Albums (Billboard)	9
US Top Hard Rock Albums (Billboard)	18

Chart (2021)	Position
Official Record Store Chart (Official Charts)	26

=== Year end charts ===
Chart (2006)	Position
UK Rock & Metal Albums (Official Charts)	16

== Certifications ==
Region	Certification	Certified units/sales
Canada (Music Canada)	Gold	50,000^{^}
United Kingdom (BPI)	Gold	100,000^{‡}
United States (RIAA)	Platinum	1,000,000^{‡}
^{^} Shipments figures based on certification alone.^{‡} Sales+streaming figures based on certification alone.
