= Whiskey cocktail =

Variety of cocktails made with whiskey

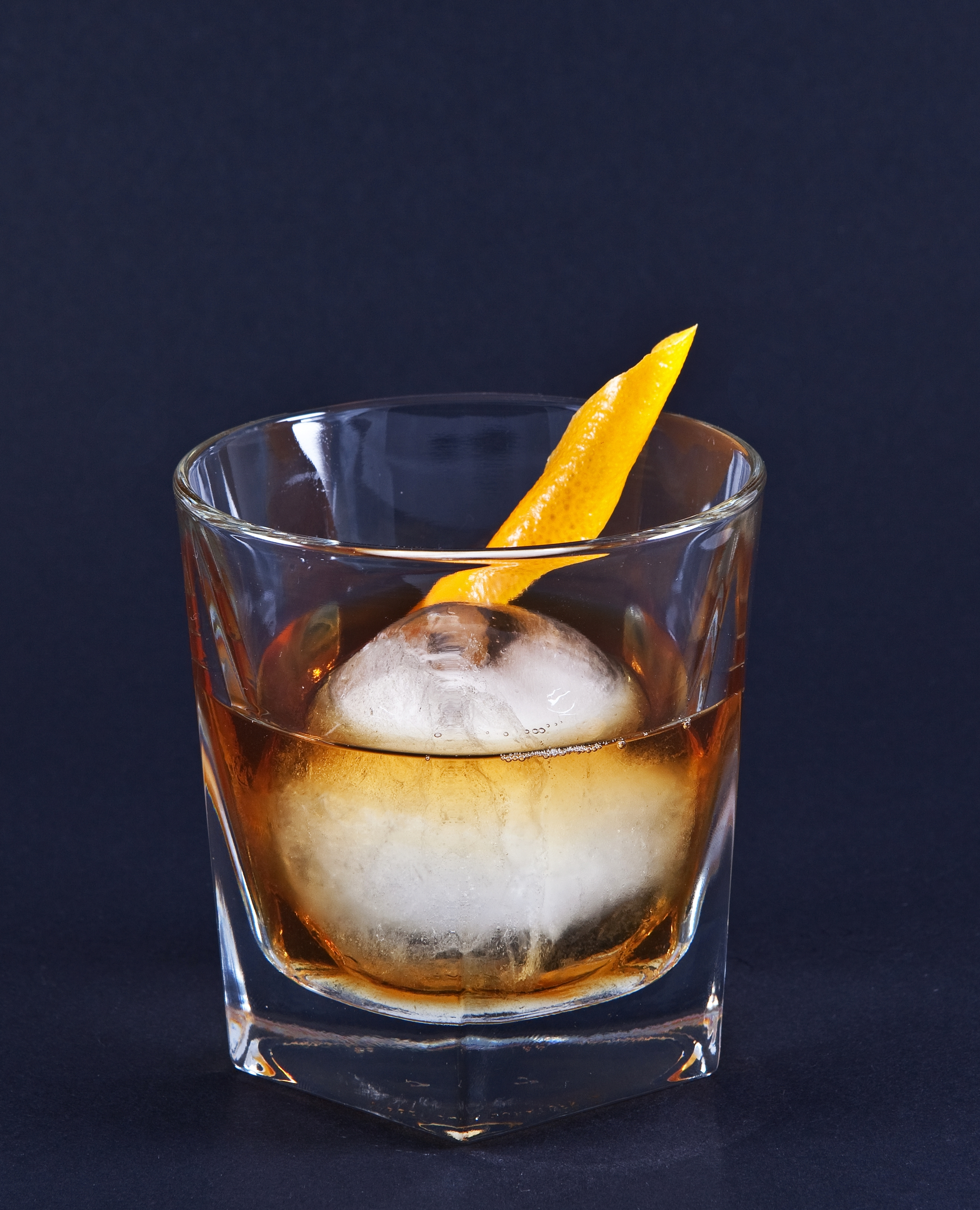
One of the original whiskey cocktails, an old fashioned

A whiskey cocktail is a cocktail that includes whiskey. Although whiskey is often served neat or on the rocks, it is used in many classic cocktails such as the Old Fashioned, Manhattan, and Julep. Some specifically call for Scotch whisky or bourbon whiskey.

== Examples ==
=== Duos ===
- Angry Granny (whiskey and red Gatorade)
- Highball (whisky and larger portion of non-alcoholic base, like soda water or ginger ale)
- Godfather (Scotch whisky and amaretto)
- Rusty Nail (Scotch whisky and Drambuie liqueur)
- Bourbon and Coke
- 7 and 7 (Seagram's Seven Crown and 7Up)
- Crowbar (Crown Royal whiskey and lemon-lime soda)
- Bure Royal (90% whiskey and 10% licor 43 in a short glass full with ice)

=== Trios ===
- Blinker (rye whiskey, grapefruit juice, grenadine)
- Rob Roy (Scotch whisky, sweet vermouth, Angostura bitters)
- Boulevardier (Bourbon, Campari, sweet red vermouth)
- Bourbon rickey (bourbon, lime juice, and sparkling water)
- Brown Derby (bourbon, grapefruit juice, honey syrup)
- Hot toddy (bourbon or rye whiskey, cloves, demerara sugar or brown sugar, lemon juice)
- Gold Rush (bourbon, honey syrup, lemon juice)
- Mint julep (bourbon, simple syrup, mint leaves)

=== Other ===
- Cold toddy (rye whiskey, oranges, lemons, cinnamon sticks, ginger, Earl Grey tea, cloves, honey, and orange or regular bitters)
- Hard cider spritz (rye whiskey, Aperol, dry hard cider, apple cider, lemon juice, club soda)
- whiskey sour (bourbon or rye whiskey, lemon juice, simple syrup, optional egg white)
- Blood orange scotch and soda (Scotch, syrup, lime juice, blood orange juice, salt, club soda)
- Libertine (bourbon, simple syrup, rosemary, lemon juice, marmalade, maple syrup, orange juice, egg white)
- Bourbon lift (bourbon, coffee liqueur, orgeat, heavy cream, club soda)
- Old Fashioned (bourbon or rye whiskey, sugar, Angostura bitters)
- Manhattan (bourbon or rye whiskey, sweet vermouth, Angostura bitters)
- Scofflaw (bourbon or rye whiskey, dry vermouth, lemon juice, grenadine, orange bitters)
