= Disarm the Descent =

Studio album by Killswitch Engage
- Released: April 2, 2013
- Recorded: September–December 2012
- Studios: Wicked Good Studios and Zing Studios, Westfield, Massachusetts
- Genre: Melodic metalcore
- Length: 40:40
- Label: Roadrunner
- Producer: Adam Dutkiewicz

Killswitch Engage chronology
Killswitch Engage (2009)	Disarm the Descent (2013)	Incarnate (2016)

Singles from Disarm the Descent
- 1. "In Due Time" Released: February 2, 2013; 2. "Always" Released: July 20, 2013

Alternate Cover Art
- Special Edition Cover

Disarm the Descent is the sixth studio album by the American metalcore band Killswitch Engage. The album was released on April 2, 2013, under Roadrunner Records. It is the band's first album with Jesse Leach on vocals since 2002's Alive or Just Breathing. Killswitch Engage announced the return of Leach in January 2012, after vocalist Howard Jones parted ways with the group due to illness. The album received generally positive reception from professional critics. It debuted at number 7 on the Billboard 200 48,000 copies in the U.S. in its first week, it also topped both the Top Hard Rock Albums Chart and the Top Rock Albums Chart.

The band embarked on the Disarm the Descent World Tour in support of the album which went from the Spring of 2013 to the Fall of 2014 lasting 166 dates.

"In Due Time", the first single from the album, was nominated for "Best Metal Performance" at the 2014 Grammy Awards.

== Background and recording ==
Prior to the album's release Howard Jones, who had been with Killswitch Engage since 2002 left the band on January 4, 2012. Following this the group held auditions to fill the position beginning on January 9, and on February 8, the group announced their original singer Jesse Leach would be returning to the band.

Due to the uncertainty surrounding Jones and the band as a whole members of Killswitch Engage took sometime off taking part in other endeavors. Drummer Justin Foley recorded an album with Unearth, guitarist Adam Dutkiewicz produced albums and bass player Mike D’Antonio worked on graphic design. However the band eventually got back together and began writing material for a new album prior to return of Leach, once he officially rejoined Leach then wrote the lyrics for the album and the rest of the band tweaked them to fit the music.

By late March of 2012, Killswitch Engage officially began tracking the album at Zing Studios. By August of that year the group had gotten 16 tracks down and went on to finish the vocals in September following a tour.

In an interview bass player Mike D’Antonio noted the album featured the "most pissed off music" he had written in a long time. He also commented on the recording process stating:

Justin, Joel, Adam and myself were putting demos and listened to them to decide what sounded good. Then we would take that and go upstairs to Adam’s Pro Tools room, where we would make drums and lay down guitar tracks, the bass etc. That’s how we drew the initial outline of music by sitting around and playing instruments together. And then Jesse just got on top of it to do his thing.

The album was produced by Adam Dutkiewicz and mixed by Andy Sneap. The album's artwork was created by bassist Mike D'Antonio and his graphic design company DarkicoN. On April 7, 2013, the group announced the album's name and release date.

Vocalist Jesse Leach stated about the album that "It is with a grateful spirit that we prepare for this record's release". "From the music, to the lyrics, to the artwork, we are all proud of what we have accomplished. To me, this is by far my best vocal performance, much thanks to Adam's guidance and faith in my abilities. I am very grateful to be where I am in life, back in an amazing band with a record we are all excited for the world to hear. Thanks to all the fans for their warm welcome back and their undying love for Killswitch Engage."

== Musical style ==
Jesse Leach stated in an interview with Loudwire that "the music is definitely the fastest Killswitch record ever, it’s very heavy but still maintains the signature Killswitch hooky, melodic stuff there too. There’s definitely melody attached but I pulled out some new styles vocally, yelling and screaming and growling and layers and it sounds massive". Attempting to match the music’s aggression Leach damaged his vocal cords while recording "You Don’t Bleed for Me" and "New Awakening." After which Leach visited vocal doctor who told him he had ahemorrhaged on one of his vocal folds.

Drummer Justin Foley stated in a documentary, detailing the making of the album, that his drumming parts features more blast beats than the other previous albums.

Musically every member of the band had a hand in writing the songs, Foley wrote "You Don’t Bleed for Me", "Beyond the Flames" is by guitarist Joel Stroetzel and "All We Have" was written by bass player Mike D’Antonio.

== Release and promotion ==
The album's first single, "In Due Time", was digitally released on February 5, 2013, and was made available for streaming on the band's YouTube channel on January 30, 2013. On February 27, 2013, the music video for "In Due Time" premiered on Rolling Stone's website. The song went on to reach #26 on the US Mainstream Rock chart.

On March 18, 2013, Killswitch Engage unveiled a second song from the album, titled "The New Awakening", on their YouTube channel. On March 26, 2013, Killswitch Engage allowed the completed album to be streamed online for 48 hours. A Special Edition version of the album, with alternate cover art, is also available digitally and on physical CD/DVD. The DVD contains a thirty-minute documentary detailing the making of the album. A Music video was also made for the song "Always."

The album was officially released on April 2, 2013 and sold 48,000 copies in the U.S. in its first week, debuting at number 7 on the Billboard 200 and number 1 in both the Top Hard Rock Albums Chart and the Top Rock Albums Chart. The album has sold 158,000 copies in the US as of February 2016. The album debuted at number 15 on the UK Albums Chart and number 6 on the ARIA Chart. As of 2016 its UK sales stand at over 83,000.

Killswitch Engage’s initial tour in support of the album was a Spring European tour which went from April 8, to May 6, 2013. Following that the band embarked on a North American tour with Miss May I, Darkest Hour, The Word Alive and Affiance as support. As I Lay Dying was originally supposed to be on the tour, but dropped out due to criminal charges against frontman Tim Lambesis. They then ended the year with another North American tour in the Fall with Lamb of God and Testament. The Disarm the Descent World Tour lasted until November 1, 2014, covering 36 countries.

== Critical reception ==
Professional ratings
Aggregate scores
Source	Rating
Metacritic	79/100
Review scores
Source	Rating
About.com	4/5 stars
Allmusic	3/5 stars
Altsounds	9/10 stars
Blabbermouth	8.5/10 stars
Decibel	7/10 stars
Exclaim!	8/10 stars
Kerrang!	4/5 stars
Metal Storm	8/10 stars
PopMatters	8/10 stars
Metal Hammer	4.5/5 stars

Critical reception for the album was highly positive; aggregate review website Metacritic assigned an overall score of 79 out of 100, based on reviews from six professional critics.

Gregory Heaney from Allmusic gave the album three out of five stars saying "In the time since Leach left the fold, Killswitch Engage have matured into a tighter, more refined band than they were for Alive or Just Breathing, and while Leach has certainly grown as a singer in the intervening years, the album doesn't quite recapture that sense of catharsis the band possessed back then." Dean Brown from PopMatters gave the album a solid eight out of ten stars saying "Disarm the Descent is the bountiful fruit of the Killswitch’s rejuvenation, and proof that, in life and metal, there are second chances."

Metal Hammer gave the album 4.5/5 stars stating "Nostalgia may preclude this album from being revered in quite the same way as the ones that first made us fall in love with this band, but the truth is that Disarm The Descent is a magnificent return to form. Killswitch Engage are still alive, still breathing and very much back in the game." Blabbermouth.net added "One thing is certain: the memorable songwriting touch that always differentiated KILLSWITCH from even their biggest competitors, and which was astonishingly absent from 2009's eponymous LP, is back in force on "Disarm and Descent", along with Adam Dutkiewicz and Joel Stroetzel's exhilarating twin-guitar interplay and a bevvy of unusually flamboyant guitar solos."

It was announced in December 2013 that the single "In Due Time" was nominated for "Best Metal Performance" at the 2014 Grammy Awards, but lost to "God Is Dead?" by Black Sabbath.

The album was named to The Phoenix New Times 21 Best Heavy Metal Albums of 2013, and was ranked number 4 on WhatCulture’s list on the Top 10 Rock / Metal Albums of 2013.

== Track listing ==
All tracks are written by Killswitch Engage.

No.	Title	Length
1.	"The Hell in Me"	2:57
2.	"Beyond the Flames"	2:53
3.	"The New Awakening"	3:30
4.	"In Due Time"	3:18
5.	"A Tribute to the Fallen"	4:02
6.	"Turning Point"	3:12
7.	"All We Have"	3:20
8.	"You Don't Bleed for Me"	3:20
9.	"The Call"	2:50
10.	"No End in Sight"	3:29
11.	"Always"	4:33
12.	"Time Will Not Remain"	3:13
Total length:		40:40

Japanese edition bonus tracks
No.	Title	Length
13.	"Blood Stains"	3:21
14.	"Slave to the Machine"	3:07
15.	"Numbered Days" (Live 2012)	3:45
16.	"My Curse" (Live 2012)	3:53
17.	"The End of Heartache" (Live 2012)	4:54
18.	"Vide Infra" (Live 2012)	3:49

Vinyl bonus track
No.	Title	Length
13.	"Always (Acoustic Version)"	3:46

== Personnel ==
Killswitch Engage

- Jesse Leach – lead vocals
- Adam Dutkiewicz – lead guitar, backing vocals
- Joel Stroetzel – rhythm guitar, backing vocals
- Mike D'Antonio – bass
- Justin Foley – drums

Technical personnel

- Produced by Adam Dutkiewicz
- Engineered by Adam Dutkiewicz & Jim Fogarty
- Mixed & mastered by Andy Sneap
- Inspiration by Alysha «Girouard» McCooe
- A&R by Dave Rath
- Art direction, Layout & design by DarkicoN Design
- Photo by Jeremy Saffer & DarkicoN Design
- Band photo by Travis Shinn
- Cover model: Brenna Daugherty
- Make-Up, Model: Christine McCarron
- Stylist, Wardrobe: by Lena Utin

== Charts ==
Chart (2013)	Peak position
Australian Albums (ARIA)	6
Austrian Albums (Ö3 Austria)	15
Belgian Albums (Ultratop Flanders)	63
Belgian Albums (Ultratop Wallonia)	94
Canadian Albums (Billboard)	6
Dutch Albums (Album Top 100)	75
Finnish Albums (Suomen virallinen lista)	8
French Albums (SNEP)	133
German Albums (Offizielle Top 100)	12
Irish Albums (IRMA)	96
Japanese Albums (Oricon)	55
New Zealand Albums (RMNZ)	17
Norwegian Albums (VG-lista)	25
Scottish Albums (Official Charts)	15
Swedish Albums (Sverigetopplistan)	48
Swiss Albums (Schweizer Hitparade)	23
UK Albums (Official Charts)	15
UK Rock & Metal Albums (Official Charts)	2
US Billboard 200	7
US Digital Albums (Billboard)	7
US Top Hard Rock Albums (Billboard)	1
US Top Rock Albums (Billboard)	1
US Indie Store Album Sales (Billboard)	5
