= The Arms of Sorrow =

Single by Killswitch Engage

from the album As Daylight Dies
- Released: April 26, 2007
- Recorded: 2006
- Genre: Melodic metalcore; heavy metal
- Length: 3:44
- Label: Roadrunner
- Songwriters: Mike D'Antonio, Adam Dutkiewicz, Justin Foley, Howard Jones, Joel Stroetzel
- Producers: Adam Dutkiewicz, Joel Stroetzel

Killswitch Engage singles chronology
"My Curse" (2006)	"The Arms of Sorrow" (2007)	"Holy Diver" (2007)

"The Arms of Sorrow" is a song by the American metalcore band Killswitch Engage. The song is the third song and second single from their 2006 release, As Daylight Dies. The video for this song premiered on the band's MySpace profile on April 26, 2007. This song is also track three on the 2007 Warped Tour Compilation. The song primarily showcases vocalist Howard Jones' clean vocals as it only features his trademark screams in the backing vocals, but the very end shows clear usage of the screams.

The song charted at No. 30 on the US Mainstream Rock chart.

== Reception ==
Raziq Rauf of Drowned in Sound wrote "The Arms Of Sorrow’ showcases Jones’ gloriously operatic vocals and adds drama via the persistently optimistic messages in his lyrics, while a suitably dramatic chorus tempers the rapidity of both ‘For You’ and ‘Still Beats Your Name." Mikesn of Sputnikmusic dubbed the song a standout track on the album noting "Fairly short at 3:50, The Arms of Sorrow has a sombre, depressing atmosphere to it, and while it isn't the only time such a mood is reflected in the band's music, it is in The Arms of Sorrow where it is most effective."

== Music video ==
The video for "The Arms of Sorrow" shows a man (Antal Kalik) falling through the air in slow motion. As he falls, he passes an apartment building. He falls past a woman doing laundry, an elderly man cutting a board with a power saw, a younger girl blowing bubbles, a woman slapping her boyfriend, two men painting, a muscular man skipping rope, a fireman on a ladder, the band, and a woman throwing a bucket of water out the window, before eventually falling into a swimming pool. Finally, the man climbs out of the pool by using the pool ladder. Scenes of the band playing in a room are shown between scenes of the man falling.

== Charts ==
Chart (2007)	Peak position
US Mainstream Rock (Billboard)	30
