= In Due Time (song) =

Single by Killswitch Engage

from the album Disarm the Descent
- Released: February 5, 2013
- Recorded: 2012 at Wicked Good Studios and Zing Studios, Westfield, Massachusetts
- Genre: Melodic metalcore
- Length: 3:18
- Label: Roadrunner
- Songwriters: Mike D'Antonio, Adam Dutkiewicz, Justin Foley, Jesse Leach, Joel Stroetzel
- Producer: Adam Dutkiewicz

Killswitch Engage singles chronology
"Save Me" (2010)	"In Due Time" (2013)	"Always" (2013)

"In Due Time" is the lead single from Killswitch Engage's sixth studio album, Disarm the Descent. The song is the band's first single to feature vocalist Jesse Leach since 2003's "The Element of One". The song charted at no. 23 on the Active rock chart and no. 26 on the Mainstream Rock chart.

The song was nominated for Best Metal Performance at the 2014 Grammy Awards.

== Music video ==
The song's music video shows the band performing the song in the studio. It was directed by Ian McFarland and Mike Pecci and released February 27, 2013.

Jesse Leach has stated that the video's concept was inspired by the early music videos for Foo Fighters.

== Reception ==
Loudwire named "In Due Time" one of the best metal songs of 2013. Fans regard the song's guitar solo as being among the best in the metalcore genre, according to the same publication. Classic Rock History ranked it the bands 6th best song dubbing it "as one of the standout offerings in the band’s impressive discography."

== Charts ==
Chart (2004)	Peak position
US Mainstream Rock (Billboard)	26
US Hard Rock Digital (Billboard)	7
UK Rock & Metal (Official Charts)	16

== Track listing ==
No.	Title	Length
1.	"In Due Time" (Radio Mix)	3:19
2.	"In Due Time" (Album Version)	3:19

== Personnel ==
- Jesse Leach – lead vocals
- Adam Dutkiewicz – lead guitar, backing vocals
- Joel Stroetzel – rhythm guitar
- Mike D'Antonio – bass
- Justin Foley – drums
