= Seagram's Seven Crown =

Blended whiskey

- Seagram's Seven Crown; American blended whiskey
- Type: Blended whiskey
- Manufacturer: Diageo
- Alcohol by volume: 40%
- Proof (US): 80
- Related products: Crown Royal, Seagram's VO
- Website: seagrams7.com

Seagram's Seven Crown, also called Seagram's Seven, or simply Seven Crown, is an American blended whiskey produced by Diageo under the Seagram's name. Seagram's beverage division was acquired by Diageo, Pernod Ricard, and The Coca-Cola Company in 2000, while Seven Crown was acquired specifically by Diageo.

Seagram's Seven is typically consumed in a highball in combination with mixers such as ginger ale, cola or lemon-lime soda. The cocktail made by mixing Seagram's Seven with 7 Up (a brand of lemon-lime soda) is known as a "Seven and Seven". It's also often used as an ingredient in Manhattans. Seagram's Seven has an alcohol by volume content of 40% (80 U.S. proof).

== Sales history ==
Seven Crown was popular in the 1970s, but saw a decrease in success along with most whiskeys in the 1980s and 1990s, when many consumers left for vodka and rum. The brand sold thirty-two million cases in 1970, but only eight million in 1993. It was the first brand to produce and sell 100 million cases, and sold 300 million by 1983. In 2018, Diageo made an effort to raise the sales of Seven Crown by introducing the first "National Dive Bar Day," which is unofficially celebrated annually on July 7. Diageo has since stated that the date was chosen in order to celebrate the "quintessential Dive Bar drink, the 7&7." In 2019, Seven Crown is reported to have sold 2.1 million 9-liter cases.
