= My Curse (song) =

Single by Killswitch Engage

from the album As Daylight Dies
- Released: November 6, 2006
- Recorded: 2006
- Genre: Melodic metalcore
- Length: 4:05
- Label: Roadrunner
- Songwriters: Mike D'Antonio, Adam Dutkiewicz, Justin Foley, Howard Jones, Joel Stroetzel

Killswitch Engage singles chronology
"A Bid Farewell" (2005)	"My Curse" (2006)	"The Arms of Sorrow" (2007)

"My Curse" is a song by the American metalcore band Killswitch Engage, the song is released as the first single from their fourth album As Daylight Dies. It reached #21 on the Mainstream Rock Tracks chart, surpassing the band's last breakthrough single "The End of Heartache". The music video was directed by Lex Halaby, who has also directed videos for Hoobastank and Mudvayne. It is also one of the band's most well known songs.

== Writing ==
Musically "My Curse" was written entirely by the band’s guitarist Adam Dutkiewicz. In a 2019 interview with Kerrang! he commented on his process stating:

the writing of it was a pretty normal process: I got my laptop going, started out with the initial riff, and then I think the first verse was what I wrote next, and it went from there. That process of starting out with a riff and building from that point is usually how I work. One riff led to another, and then I took the finished product to the rest of the band. They liked it, so we went ahead with things in a very democratic way.

Although Dutkiewicz stated that, musically, it was one of the easiest songs the band had written, the lyrical content was more heavily debated. The lyrics were written by vocalist Howard Jones, while Dutkiewicz offered input on the lyrics, expressing dissatisfaction with the chorus and stating that "it could be hookier." This led to discussions between Jones and Dutkiewicz over the lyrical content; however, they ended up settling on what Jones had written originally.

== Music video ==
=== Description ===
In the music video, the vast majority of the lyrics are sung cleanly (not screamed), however on the album much of the lyrics including the chorus are screamed. The music video opens in a golden field with hills in the background, focusing on a woman in a white dress with the sun shining bright in the serene blue sky. Numerous stacks of books are also present in the field; some are scattered and messily thrown about, some have insects crawling on the pages. The woman is also shown lying on top of the books.

One book in particular is picked up as the scene transitions to a man dressed in black in a small, dimly lit study with only a little sunlight shining through the slightly open drapes; the mood of the room juxtaposes the mood of the bright and open field. As he flips through the book, Howard Jones is shown singing, and then the rest of the band members appear playing their instruments. The mysterious man in black continues to pull books from the shelves and continues to flip through them; whenever the contents of a book are shown, members of Killswitch Engage are shown.

The man gazes upon an empty bookcase as the scene transitions again to the field. The woman in white and the stacks of books are shown again.

The man, still in his dimly lit room, begins to return the books to the bookcase, and unrolls a large sheet of paper that contains plans for the arrangement of the books on the bookcase. The man painstakingly reorganizes the books on the shelf according to his messily drawn plans. Still, all the while books are shown being flipped through, exposing the band singing or playing their instruments, and the man continues to draw plans and scribble out sections of the bookcase. He stares out of the window and then sits on a chair, presumably thinking of the woman standing in the field.

The empty bookcase in the field continues to stand before the rolling hills and bright blue sky. The case is then shown completely filled with the organized books, and the scene shifts back to the man whose eyes then look back up, staring at a vacant section of the bookcase. His head turns to look at a black book with the letters "KSE" (which stands for Killswitch Engage) printed on the cover and spine. He retrieves the book, causing other books to fall, and flips through it. This time, it is the woman who is seen in the pages staring back at the man. The man places the book in the vacant space on the shelf, at which point white beams of light emit from the shelf as the man steps backward.

When he removes the KSE book, he is able to peer through the bookcase and into the yellow field and see the woman. He reaches out through the bookcase and into the field, and the woman in the white dress takes his hand. The dark study is now empty with a vibrant light glaring through the empty section of the bookcase. The man in black is now lying in the field next to the woman in white as they gaze into each other's eyes; they are then seen standing side by side, staring off into the blue sky beyond the hills.

The man in black is then seen back in the study, lying dead under the fallen bookcase and atop a scattered stack of books on the floor, holding the KSE book, which falls from his hand. The plans are shown once more with a bold red circle around an "X" at the center of the bookcase where the KSE book was previously placed as the video fades to black.

== Reception ==
In a 2018 poll held by Revolver Magazine "My Curse" was voted Killswitch Engage’s third best song: Revolver wrote the song is "A churning reflection on grief and loss, “My Curse” is one of Killswitch Engage’s most successful songs to date, cracking the Top 30 on the Billboard Mainstream Rock Tracks chart. "This is my curse, the longing," Jones wails, laying the song’s amorous skeletons bare. "This is my curse, time/This is my curse, the yearning." Additionally Classic Rock History dubbed it the bands best song stating "My Curse" transcended expectations to secure its place as a global favorite among the band’s repertoire. The track delves into the profound theme of lingering on the memory of a deeply cherished departed soul, echoing the emotional depth found in other band ballads like "The End of Heartache."

In 2024 Ultimate Guitar named the song the most era defining metalcore song of the 2000s claiming the song "features all the elements that made this era of music great but also serves as a leading example for many of them."

== Performances ==
"My Curse" was performed on Jimmy Kimmel Live on April 18, 2007.

== In popular culture ==
- The song is featured in the videogames Burnout Dominator along with Burnout Paradise, Guitar Hero III: Legends of Rock, Sleeping Dogs and as downloadable content for Rock Band as part of the "Roadrunner 6 Pack".
- The song was used as the entrance song for Tim Hague at UFC 102.

== Chart history ==
Chart (2006–2007)	Peak position
US Mainstream Rock (Billboard)	21

== Certifications ==
Region	Certification	Certified units/sales
United Kingdom (BPI)	Silver	200,000^{‡}
United States (RIAA)	Platinum	1,000,000^{‡}
^{‡} Sales+streaming figures based on certification alone.

== Personnel ==
- Howard Jones - lead vocals
- Adam Dutkiewicz - lead guitar, backing vocals
- Joel Stroetzel - rhythm guitar
- Mike D'Antonio - bass
- Justin Foley - drums
