= Hate by Design =

Single by Killswitch Engage

from the album Incarnate
- Released: January 29, 2016
- Genre: Melodic metalcore
- Length: 3:59
- Label: Roadrunner
- Songwriter: Killswitch Engage
- Producer: Adam Dutkiewicz

Killswitch Engage singles chronology
"Strength of the Mind" (2015)	"Hate by Design" (2016)	"Cut Me Loose" (2016)

"Hate by Design" is a song by the American metalcore band Killswitch Engage. It was released as the second single from their seventh album, Incarnate on January 29, 2016. The song was accompanied with an official black and white music video upon release. It reached number 22 on U.S. Mainstream Rock chart.

== Background ==
The lyrics see Jesse Leach delve into his personal philosophy of preaching acceptance. It also critiques societal flaws, highlighting the prevalence of bigotry and ignorance.

During an interview with Metal Hammer, Leach commented on the song stating "If you pay attention to what’s going on in the world, you’re going to get overwhelmed. I’m affected by it. I allowed myself to be affected by it by paying attention and watching the news, and the terrible stuff they put on. This song was my reaction to that."

== Reception ==
Loudwire wrote "Hate by Design" sees Killswitch Engage volley between playful rests at the start, heaping the tension on the listener before finally tearing into the verse." Greg Kennelty of Metal Injection commented on the song stating "It feels like a killer callback to the older Killswitch Engage sound. Not to mention I absolutely cannot get the chorus out of my head."

In a 2018 Poll by Revolver Magazine "Hate By Design" was voted Killswitch Engage’s 4th greatest song. The publication added that the song is a "compelling combination of message and melody." Additionally Classic Rock History dubbed it the bands 10th greatest song calling it the "standout track on Incarnate."

== Charts ==
Chart (2016)	Peak position
US Mainstream Rock (Billboard)	22
US Hard Rock Digital (Billboard)	6
US Rock Digital Songs (Billboard)	40
