= Incarnate (Killswitch Engage album) =

Studio album by Killswitch Engage
- Released: March 11, 2016
- Recorded: August–December 2015
- Studios: Wicked Good Studios in Southampton, Massachusetts; Signature Sound in San Diego, California
- Genre: Melodic metalcore
- Length: 43:52
- Label: Roadrunner
- Producer: Adam Dutkiewicz

Killswitch Engage chronology
Disarm the Descent (2013)	Incarnate (2016)	Atonement (2019)

Singles from Incarnate
- 1. "Strength of the Mind" Released: December 11, 2015 (Promotional); 2. "Hate by Design" Released: January 29, 2016; 3. "Cut Me Loose" Released: February 16, 2016

Incarnate is the seventh studio album by the American metalcore band Killswitch Engage, released on March 11, 2016. The band released "Strength of the Mind" as a promotional single from the album on December 11, 2015 and revealed the title of the album six days later. The band toured to promote the album with Memphis May Fire and 36 Crazyfists. On January 26, 2016, the track listing was revealed. Three singles were released from the album: "Strength of the Mind" on December 11 (with an accompanying video), "Hate by Design" on January 29 (with an accompanying video) and "Cut Me Loose" on February 19. The album debuted at No. 6 on the Billboard 200, making it the band's most successful album on the chart, and reached No. 1 on both the Top Rock Albums and Hard Rock Albums charts, with 33,000 copies sold on its first week of release.

== Writing and recording ==
On March 31, 2015, it was announced the band had begun pre-production for their new album and drum tracking would commence that week.

Writing this album proved to be lengthy and troublesome, Adam Dutkiewicz commenting that lead singer Jesse Leach had "hit a wall with ideas" during the songwriting process after completing three or four tracks on the album, adding that "[Jesse] couldn't find lyrics he was really stoked on". Leach himself has stated that he "came to a point where this album literally drove me crazy", in that "there were a good couple of weeks where I wasn't myself. I just got lost in the process, because I wanted this record to be everything it could be. I was losing sleep, not sleeping at all, and waking up in the middle of the night and sitting down and writing pages and pages and pages of words. By the time all was said and done, I probably had 80 pages of lyrics. I just wanted to give it everything I could, vocally and lyrically."

Leach spoke at length on the lyrical themes that comprise the album, telling Blabbermouth that "I wanted to be able to speak on current events — stuff that is relevant to us today, stuff that's in the headlines — but I wanted to do it in such a way where it's ambiguous enough where people can sort of draw their own conclusion. I just wanted to strike people to think. So that's one aspect of it. And the other aspect of it is speaking about my truths, like what I think. And I'd sort of separated myself from all that stuff — social media and the news and all the violence and racism that's going on in our media these days; I just couldn't deal with it. So in order for me to make a valid point that said something, I had to submerge myself into that stuff and really start paying attention to what's going on. And songs like 'Hate By Design', 'Alone I Stand', 'The Great Deceit' came out of those processes in writing. And the other side of it was the spiritual realm, the soul-searching stuff. I really had to re-evaluate myself, as far as where I am in my own mind, so I had to seclude myself. So it was a balance between submerging myself in all the terrible things that are going on and then distancing myself and finding solace and really doing some soul searching on my own, and both of those things happened while writing this record."

On October 8, 2015, the band announced that they had finished the recording process.

== Song meanings ==
The opening track "Alone I Stand" was described by lead singer Jesse Leach "musically a Disarm the Descent song" and was written 6 years prior to the album’s release, it focuses on defiance and political issues. "Hate By Design" is Leach’s reaction to be affected by watching "terrible stuff" on the news. "Cut Me Loose" is a personal song by Leach reflecting on his life during a time he felt suicidal. "Strength of Mind" is a motivational song about reaching rock bottom and trying to get out of it. Leach stated that the fifth track "Just Let Go" "comes from a really dark place". "Embrace the Journey... Upraised" is a deep soul searching song that he stated he couldn’t talk about without getting personal. "Quiet Distress" is about domestic violence, "Until the Day" is about life on the road and touring. "It Falls on Me" is a song about Leach realizing he is not the same person he once was, "The Great Deceit" is Leach’s political anthem on the album focusing on his anger with how the world works. "We Carry On" is a song about moving on following difficult times and the final song "Ascension" was described by Leach as his battle cry.

== Album title and cover art ==
Leach, upon being questioned about the meaning of the album's title and cover artwork, stated "[The title] wasn't a catalyst for the record. It actually came when we were about three quarters of the way done with the record. Our bass player Mike [D'Antonio], who does all of our artwork and designing and t-shirts and everything, came up with the title out of nowhere. I'd actually sent him an idea I had for the album cover, which… I came out of a nightmare and had a dream of a man being pulled apart by two snakes and two cranes, and his insides kind of, like, coming out, which is pretty graphic and not really our style for KILLSWITCH, but it was the image that we used and had transformed by another artist. And then he said he was looking at it and the word 'incarnate' just came to him. And I thought, 'What a great word!' It just sounds good, it's ambiguous enough where people can draw their own conclusion, and the definition of it is 'in the flesh,' which is almost like an ambiguous definition. So it just sort of causes thought, and I love that about it. I love that it just sounds epic and causes conversation."

== Release and promotion ==
The first single "Strength of the Mind" was released on December 10, 2015 and was accompanied by a music video directed by Ian McFarland. On December 16, Killswitch Engage officially announced the album title Incarnate with a tentative release of March of 2016.

The second single "Hate by Design" was released on January 29, in 2016 and also had a music video that was directed by Ian McFarland. The third and final single "Cut Me Loose" was made available on February 16, and also had a music video made.

The album was officially released on March 11, 2016 selling around 33,000-35,000 copies in its first week debuting at No. 6 on the Billboard 200, making it the band's most successful album on the chart. The album topped the US Top Rock & Alternative Albums, Top Rock Albums, Top Hard Rock Albums and internationally the UK Rock & Metal Albums. It also charted in the top 10 in 6 other countries, including multiple career best chart placements on the Australian Albums chart at 5, Canadian Albums at 4, UK Albums at 10.

Following the album’s release Killswitch Engage went on a Spring North American tour alongside Memphis May Fire and 36 Crazyfists. During promotional touring the band also made multiple festival appearances and went on a US tour in August and September of 2016 with Volbeat and Black Wizard.

== Critical reception ==
Professional ratings
Aggregate scores
Source	Rating
Metacritic	78/100
Review scores
Source	Rating
AllMusic	3.5/5 stars
AntiHero Magazine	3/5 stars
The Guardian	4/5 stars
Kerrang!	4/5 stars
Loudwire	Favorable
Metal Injection	9/10
New Noise Magazine	3/5 stars
Stereoboard	3/5 stars
Ultimate Guitar	8/10

The album was included in Rolling Stone’s list of the "25 Most Anticipated Metal Albums for 2016".

Critical reception for Incarnate was generally positive upon release. Aggregate review website Metacritic has assigned the album an overall score of 78 out of 100, based on reviews from five professional critics as of March 11, 2016.

Thom Jurek from AllMusic awarded the album a score of 3.5/5, stating that "as a whole, Incarnate improves on the creativity and restlessness offered by Disarm the Descent. There is a lot more ambition, confidence and above all, passion here. The Guardian gave the album 4/5 stars writing on Jesse Leach’s performance "Despite still occasionally erring towards po-faced earnestness, his impassioned and fiery performance ensures that Incarnate is a brash reaffirmation of this band’s superiority over their peers."

Metal Injection also gave the album a positive review stating "It's nigh impossible to not listen to the album one time and not have at least one memorable chorus or catchy riff drill its way into your brain, and that shows the strength of the album. Time will determine how Incarnate stacks up to rest of Killswitch's legendary catalog, but with songs like these, it's hard to imagine that this album won't breathe new life into a band that's still going strong."

Alec Chillingworth of Stereoboard.com was slightly more critical of the album, stated that "Incarnate is not the best Killswitch Engage album. It's not as immediate as you're used to and it does suffer when held up against Alive or Just Breathing, Disarm the Descent or even The End of Heartache. It does occasionally take risks, and they do pay off, but otherwise it plods along at a pedestrian pace, only to be redeemed in part by Leach's vocal versatility." Chillingworth did, however, praise lead vocalist Jesse Leach's vocal delivery throughout the album, by stating that he thought "Leach's vocals, at least, are never short of incredible and 'Incarnate' is arguably his strongest and most diverse outing with the band. His cleans are more controlled, his screams even dirtier than before and the chant of 'the screams, the cries!' on Quiet Distress finds him sounding a bit like Prong's Tommy Victor."

== Track listing ==
All tracks are written by Killswitch Engage.

No.	Title	Length
1.	"Alone I Stand"	4:30
2.	"Hate by Design"	3:47
3.	"Cut Me Loose"	3:02
4.	"Strength of the Mind"	3:48
5.	"Just Let Go"	3:04
6.	"Embrace the Journey... Upraised"	5:26
7.	"Quiet Distress"	3:47
8.	"Until the Day"	2:56
9.	"It Falls on Me"	3:46
10.	"The Great Deceit"	3:08
11.	"We Carry On"	3:24
12.	"Ascension"	3:14
Total length:		43:52

Special edition bonus tracks
No.	Title	Length
13.	"Reignite"	2:59
14.	"Triumph Through Tragedy"	2:40
15.	"Loyalty" (From Catch the Throne: The Mixtape Volume 2)	3:51
Total length:		53:22

Japanese special edition bonus track
No.	Title	Length
16.	"In Due Time" (live)	3:35
Total length:		56:57

== Personnel ==
Credits adapted from album's liner notes.

Killswitch Engage

- Jesse Leach – lead vocals
- Adam Dutkiewicz – lead guitar, backing vocals
- Joel Stroetzel – rhythm guitar, backing vocals
- Mike D'Antonio – bass
- Justin Foley – drums

Technical personnel

- Trash D – producer, engineer, mixing
- Daniel Castleman – engineer
- Steve the Dog – assistant engineer
- Ted Jensen – mastering
- Indra Nugroho – album illustrations
- Travis Shinn – group photos
- Mike D – art direction and layout
- Vaughn Lewis – management
- Kenny Gabor – management
- Dave Rath – A&R
- Mark Scribner – business manager
- Nicholas C. Ferrara – legal representation
- Tim Borror – U.S. booking
- Paul Ryan – international booking

== Charts ==
=== Weekly Charts ===
Chart (2016)	Peak position
Australian Albums (ARIA)	5
Austrian Albums (Ö3 Austria)	10
Belgian Albums (Ultratop Flanders)	30
Belgian Albums (Ultratop Wallonia)	71
Canadian Albums (Billboard)	4
Dutch Albums (Album Top 100)	99
Finnish Albums (Suomen virallinen lista)	14
German Albums (Offizielle Top 100)	10
Hungarian Albums (MAHASZ)	29
Irish Albums (IRMA)	50
New Zealand Albums (RMNZ)	20
Scottish Albums (OCC)	10
Swiss Albums (Schweizer Hitparade)	10
UK Albums (OCC)	10
UK Albums Sales Chart (OCC)	9
UK Album Downloads (OCC)	16
UK Physical Albums (OCC)	13
UK Rock & Metal Albums (OCC)	1
US Billboard 200 (Billboard)	6
US Top Hard Rock Albums (Billboard)	1
US Top Rock Albums (Billboard)	1
US Top Rock & Alternative Albums (Billboard)	1
US Indie Store Album Sales (Billboard)	5

=== Year-end charts ===
Chart (2016)	Position
US Top Rock Albums (Billboard)	63
