= Always (Killswitch Engage song) =

Single by Killswitch Engage

from the album Disarm the Descent
- Released: July 26, 2013
- Recorded: 2012 at Wicked Good Studios and Zing Studios, Westfield, Massachusetts
- Genre: Alternative metal, melodic metalcore
- Length: 3:56
- Label: Roadrunner
- Songwriters: Mike D'Antonio; Adam Dutkiewicz; Justin Foley; Jesse Leach; Joel Stroetzel
- Producer: Adam Dutkiewicz

Killswitch Engage singles chronology
"In Due Time" (2013)	"Always" (2013)	"Beyond the Flames" (2013)

"Always" is the second single from Killswitch Engage's sixth studio album, Disarm the Descent. The song charted at No. 15 on the Mainstream Rock chart in the US.

== Music video ==
At the time of the song’s release it was accompanied with an official lyric video. The songs music video was later released in October 2013. It was directed by Ian McFarland and Mike Pecci, follows two estranged brothers going on one final road trip as the oldest one is dying.

Music Feeds stated "Frontman Jesse Leach‘s swelling vocals combine with the epic visuals, which focus on the literal meaning of the song, that is, a bond that can’t be broken regardless of what happens."

== Track listing ==
No.	Title	Length
1.	"Always" (Radio Edit)	3:56

== Personnel ==
- Jesse Leach – lead vocals
- Adam Dutkiewicz – guitar, backing vocals
- Joel Stroetzel – guitar
- Mike D'Antonio – bass
- Justin Foley – drums
