= 7 and 7 =

Mixed drink of Seagram's Seven Crown and 7 Up

Seven and Seven
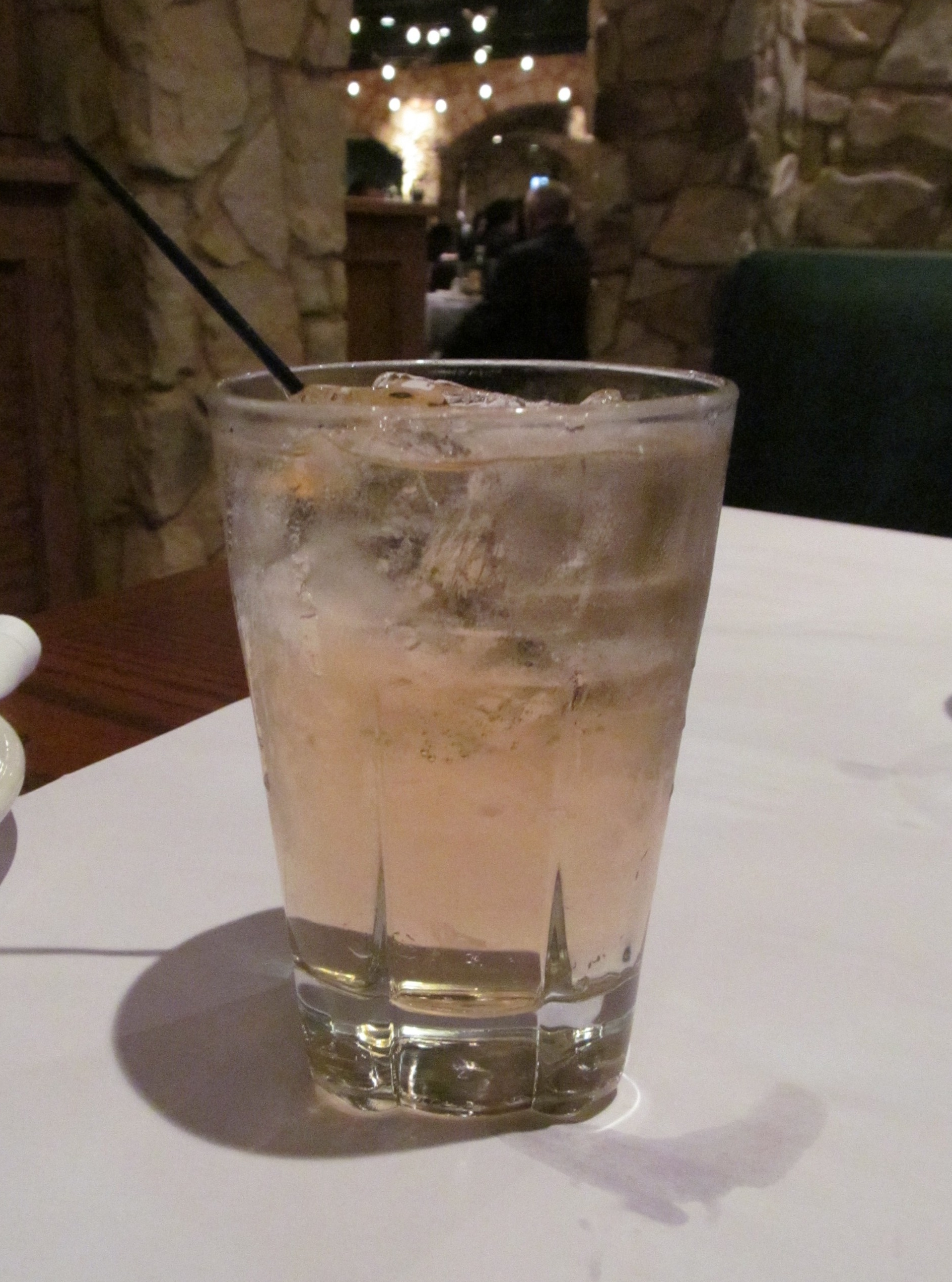
- Type: Highball
- Ingredients: 1 shot (about 45 ml) Seagram's Seven Crown whiskey; 4–6 oz (about 150 ml) 7 Up; Ice
- Standard drinkware: Collins glass
- Served: On the rocks: poured over ice
- Preparation: Pour whiskey into Collins glass filled with ice. Fill to desired level with 7 Up. Stir lightly.

A Seven and Seven or 7 and 7 is a highball cocktail, a mixed alcoholic drink containing Seagram's Seven Crown, which is a blended whiskey, and 7 Up, which is a lemon-lime soft drink. It is typically served with ice. It was one of the most popular drinks in the United States during the 1970s.

== Mixture ==
The following is a typical recipe for a 7 and 7:

- Fill a highball glass with ice cubes.
- Add 1 shot (about 1.5 US fl oz or 45 ml) Seagram's Seven Crown whisky.
- Add 4–6 US fluid ounces (120–180 ml) 7 Up, to taste.
- Garnish with lemon or lime wedge (optional).

== See also ==
- List of cocktails
- List of IBA official cocktails
