= Heartist =

American rock band

- Origin: Southern California
- Genres: Post-hardcore, hard rock
- Years active: 2011–present
- Labels: Roadrunner
- Members: Robby DeVito; Tim Koch; Bryce Beckley; William Catlin; Matt Marquez

Heartist is an American rock band that started in Orange County, California in 2011. They formed in early 2011 after guitarists Jonathan Gaytan and Tim Koch left their band, and found Bryce Beckley, who had also left his band, Evan Ranallo and Matt Marquez, who was playing with Norma Jean. Following the departure of Gaytan, Robby DeVito took over as guitarist. They released their first full-length album, Feeding Fiction, in 2014. It was produced by David Bendeth, who has previously worked with artists including Paramore, Of Mice and Men, and Breaking Benjamin. On April 14, 2014, the band released the first single, "Pressure Point", from their first album.

Their first work, the Nothing You Didn't Deserve EP, was released on October 16, 2012.

== Discography ==
Studio albums

- Feeding Fiction (2014)

Extended plays

- Nothing You Didn't Deserve (2012)
- Sleep (2019)

Singles

- 2014 "Skeletons", No. 40 US Mainstream Rock Songs
- 2015 "Ignite"
- 2024 “Borealis”
