= Mike D'Antonio =

American bassist (born 1973)

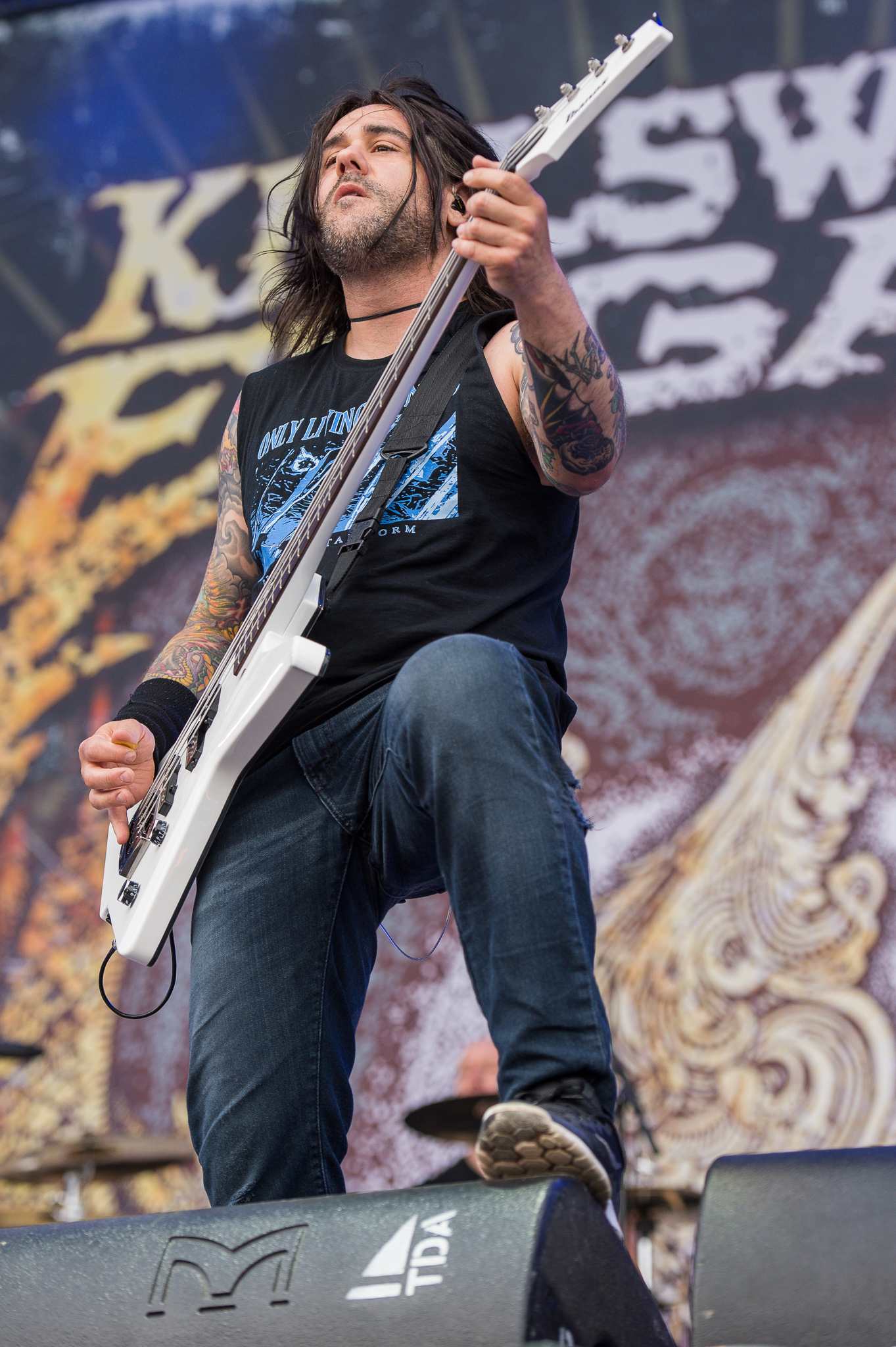
- D'Antonio with Killswitch Engage in 2016

Background information
- Born: Michael D'Antonio; May 19, 1973 (age 53)
- Genres: Metalcore; melodic metalcore; hardcore punk; thrash metal
- Occupation: Musician
- Instrument: Bass
- Years active: 1991–present
- Member of: Killswitch Engage; Death Ray Vision
- Formerly of: Overcast

Michael D'Antonio (born May 19, 1973) is an American musician, best known as the bass guitarist and a founding member of the metalcore band Killswitch Engage. He is also the founder and bassist of the bands Overcast and Death Ray Vision.

== Music career ==
In a 2013 interview, D'Antonio revealed he first got involved in music as a teenager, and he reflected on becoming a bass player:

I had two friends out of which one was playing bass, one was playing guitar. I tried both those instruments and I liked the guitar better, but I could afford a bass and I couldn’t afford the guitar – I think it was a 50 dollars difference. So I bought the bass and I got tablature sheets with all those old punk rock tunes that I started to learn how to play. I’m all self-taught in that way, and the strange part is that now as I grow older and look at my style, I play like a rhythm guitarist on a bass. [laughs] Maybe I’m just wishing I was the guitarist, I don’t know, but that’s really my style that’s made itself known.

D'Antonio's formed his first band, Overcast, in 1990 in Boston. Overcast's first 7-inch, Bleed Into One, was released in 1992 through Exchange Records. The band's first full-length, Expectational Dilution, was released in 1994 and is considered a groundbreaking effort in the metalcore scene. Their final full-length, Fight Ambition To Kill, was released in 1997. This release was followed by nationwide touring with Shai Hulud and Disembodied. Overcast eventually split up in November 1998.

Following the demise of Overcast, D'Antonio collaborated with Aftershock guitarist Adam Dutkiewicz. Dutkiewicz, now playing drums, recruited guitarist Joel Stroetzel from Aftershock and vocalist Jesse Leach to form Killswitch Engage in 1999. The group's self-titled album was shortly released a year later in 2000, but their big break came in 2002 with their sophomore album Alive or Just Breathing. The group then experienced continued success with their next two albums, The End of Heartache (2004) and As Daylight Dies (2007). The group have been considered one of the more influential bands in the metalcore genre and have released 9 total albums, along with being nominated for 3 Grammy Awards for Best Metal Performance. Their most recent album, This Consequence, was released in 2025.

In 2005, the Roadrunner United project began recording, in which, D'Antonio performed on 3 songs. His Killswitch Engage bandmate, Howard Jones, was also part of this project and performed vocals on the opening track, "The Dagger".

On April 29, 2006, D'Antonio reunited with his former Overcast bandmates to play at the New England Metal and Hardcore Festival. The band then announced that they re-recorded archive material and two new tracks, produced by metal producer Nick Raskulinecz, under the name Reborn to Kill Again. The group has also played sporadically during the 2020s.

D'Antonio's latest side project band is Death Ray Vision, which he formed in 2010 alongside former Overcast bandmate Brian Fair. Their first EP was released in 2011. They have since released 3 albums.

== Equipment and influences ==
D'Antonio uses his signature Ibanez basses and an EBS bass rig.

D'Antonio's writing influences include old New York Hardcore bands like Cro-Mags, Leeway, Madball, Agnostic Front, along with some Swedish metal acts. He cites Cliff Burton of thrash metal band Metallica and Harley Flanagan of the Cro-Mags as personal influences.

== Visual art ==
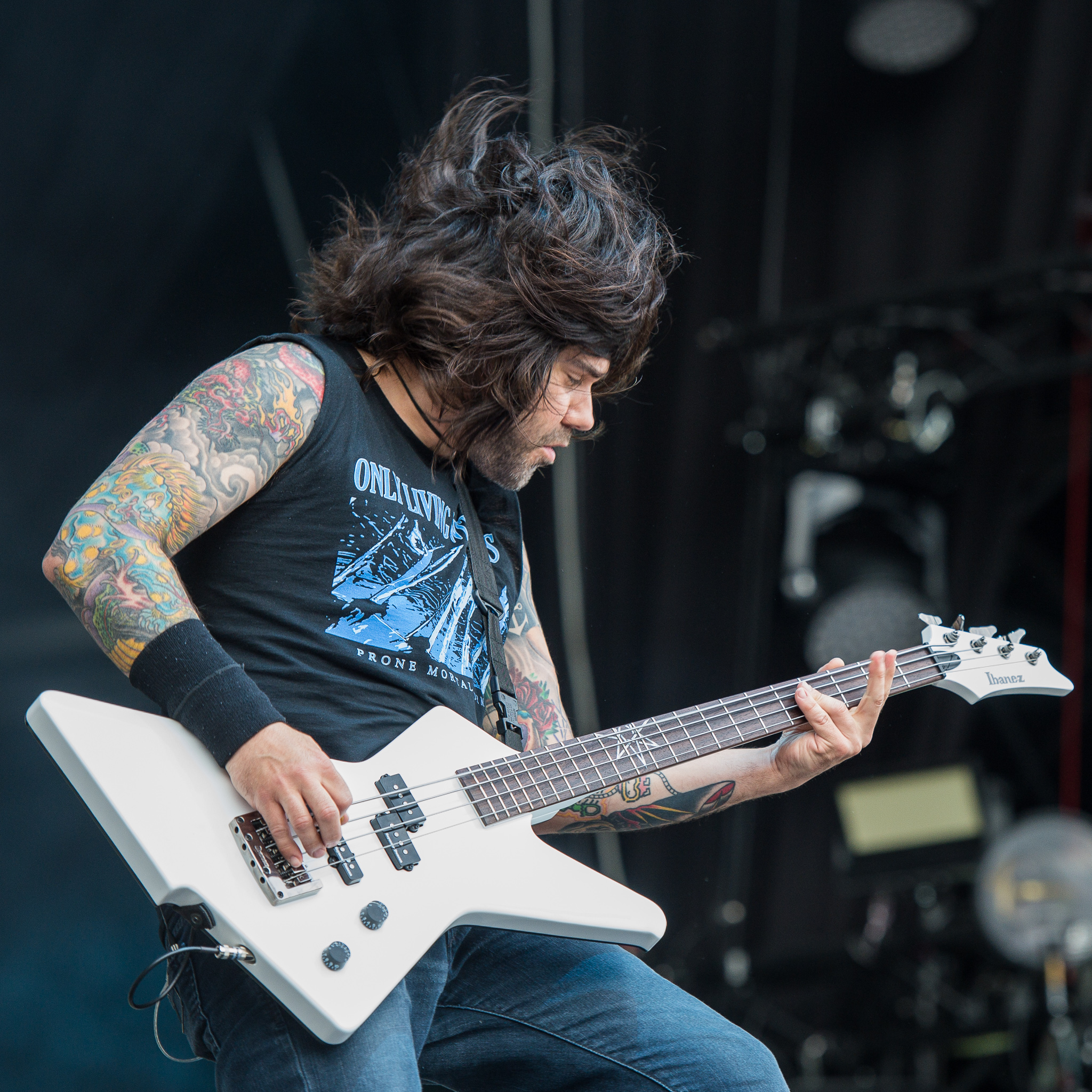
D'Antonio in 2016

D'Antonio first got involved in graphic design in high school, when he would make posters, 7″ covers, demo tape covers and stickers for his friend’s bands. In an interview he stated "I see myself, first and for most as a Graphic designer / artist and a musician second. I never thought I would be playing music as a full time gig… ever." Some of his influences include David Carson and Travis Smith. Killswitch Engage got its first recording deal as a favor for the artwork he created for Ferret records.

All of Killswitch Engage's album artwork and tour merchandise is designed by D'Antonio, who has his own design company founded in 1992 called DarkicoN design. They have also produced artwork for bands such as All That Remains, Shadows Fall, Crowbar, record labels like Flatline, festivals such as the New England Metal and Hardcore Fest, and guitar and clothing companies. D’Antonio does much of his graphic design work on tour and has stated that it "saves him" when he doesn’t feel like playing music.

=== Clients ===
D'Antonio has worked on art and design for dozens of bands and companies, including:

- 36 Crazyfists
- All That Remains
- Armored Saint
- Bane
- Blood Has Been Shed
- Crowbar
- Cannibal Corpse
- Charred Walls of the Damned
- Death Ray Vision
- Disembodied
- Diecast
- Ferret Music
- Harley-Davidson
- Hatebreed
- Hatewear (Jamey Jasta)
- Heaven Shall Burn
- Killswitch Engage
- Madball
- Martin Casaus
- Metal Blade Records
- New England Metal and Hardcore Festival
- Overcast
- Road Runner Records
- Sam Black Church
- Seemless
- Soilwork
- Shadows Fall
- Sworn Enemy
- Six Feet Under
- Tapout
- Trivium
- Throwdown
- Thy Will Be Done
- Unearth

== Impact ==
In 2025 Revolver Magazine wrote D’Antonio’s impact stating "D’Antonio is a two-time hall of famer in the Massachusetts heavy-music scene. Through the Nineties, he was slinging chaotic rhythms for early metalcore trailblazers Overcast — alongside future Shadows Fall singer Brian Fair — and by the next decade he was selling millions of records as part of the revolutionary Killswitch Engage."

== Personal life ==
D’Antonio has been a vegetarian since the early 1990s. He is also an avid collector of skateboard decks.

== Discography ==
=== Overcast ===
- Expectational Dilution (1994)
- Fight Ambition to Kill (1997)
- Reborn to Kill Again (2008)

=== Killswitch Engage ===
- Killswitch Engage (2000)
- Alive or Just Breathing (2002)
- The End of Heartache (2004)
- As Daylight Dies (2006)
- Killswitch Engage (2009)
- Disarm the Descent (2013)
- Incarnate (2016)
- Atonement (2019)
- This Consequence (2025)

=== Roadrunner United ===
- "In the Fire" (Track 4)
- "Blood & Flames" (Track 13)
- "I Don't Wanna Be (A Superhero)" (Track 15)

=== Death Ray Vision ===
- Get Lost or Get Dead (EP) (2011)
- We Ain't Leavin' Till You're Bleedin' (2013)
- Negative Mental Attitude (2018)
- No Mercy from Electric Eyes (2023)
