= Lost in the Fire (disambiguation) =

"Lost in the Fire" is a 2019 single by Gesaffelstein and the Weeknd.

Lost in the Fire may also refer to:

== Other songs ==
- "Lost in the Fire", by James LaBrie from Impermanent Resonance, 2013
- "Lost in the Fire", by Light the Torch from Revival, 2018
- "Lost in the Fire", by the Storm from Rebel Against Yourself, 2011

== Other works ==
- Lost in the Fire, an On the Case with Paula Zahn episode, 2011
- Lost in the Fire, a 2018 hip-hop album by the Arsonists

== See also ==
- Things We Lost in the Fire (disambiguation)
