= They Bleed Red =

Studio album by Devil You Know
- Released: November 6, 2015
- Recorded: June 2015
- Genre: Metalcore
- Length: 47:25
- Label: Nuclear Blast
- Producer: Josh Wilbur

Devil You Know chronology
The Beauty of Destruction (2014)	They Bleed Red (2015)	Revival (2018)

Singles from They Bleed Red
- 1. "Stay of Execution" Released: September 10, 2015; 2. "The Way We Die" Released: October 5, 2015

Professional ratings
Review scores
Source	Rating
MetalSucks	3/5 stars

They Bleed Red is the second studio album by American metalcore band Devil You Know. It was released on November 6, 2015 through Nuclear Blast Records. The band released the single "Stay of Execution" on September 10, 2015, to promote the album along with its announcement. A second single was released on October 5 called "The Way We Die". This is the band's final studio album to be released under the Devil You Know moniker before the band formally changed their name to Light the Torch and final album to feature John Sankey.

== Track listing ==
All lyrics are written by Howard Jones, with additional lyrics by Josh Wilbur; all music is composed by Francesco Artusato and John Sankey.

No.	Title	Length
1.	"Consume the Damned"	3:37
2.	"The Way We Die"	3:31
3.	"Your Last Breath"	4:30
4.	"Stay of Execution"	3:39
5.	"Break the Ties"	4:39
6.	"Shattered Silence"	4:15
7.	"Let the Pain Take Hold"	4:33
8.	"Master of None"	4:54
9.	"Searching for the Sun"	3:55
10.	"How the End Shall Be"	4:32
11.	"Broken by the Cold"	5:20
Total length:		47:25

Bonus tracks
No.	Title	Writer(s)	Length
12.	"Eye of the Tiger" (Survivor cover)	Jim Peterik; Frankie Sullivan	4:04
13.	"I Am Alive"		4:32
14.	"We Live"		2:56
Total length:			58:57

== Personnel ==
Devil You Know

- Howard Jones – lead vocals, gang vocals
- Francesco Artusato – guitar, engineer, gang vocals
- John Sankey – drums, percussion, gang vocals
- Ryan Wombacher – bass guitar, gang vocals

Additional personnel

- Josh Wilbur – producer and mixing (1–13), engineer, mastering, gang vocals
- Logan Mader – producer and mixing (14)
- Paul Suarez – engineer
- Adam Lithium – assistant engineering
- Brian Harris – assistant engineering, gang vocals
- Marco Morselli – gang vocals
