= Light the Torch =

American metalcore supergroup

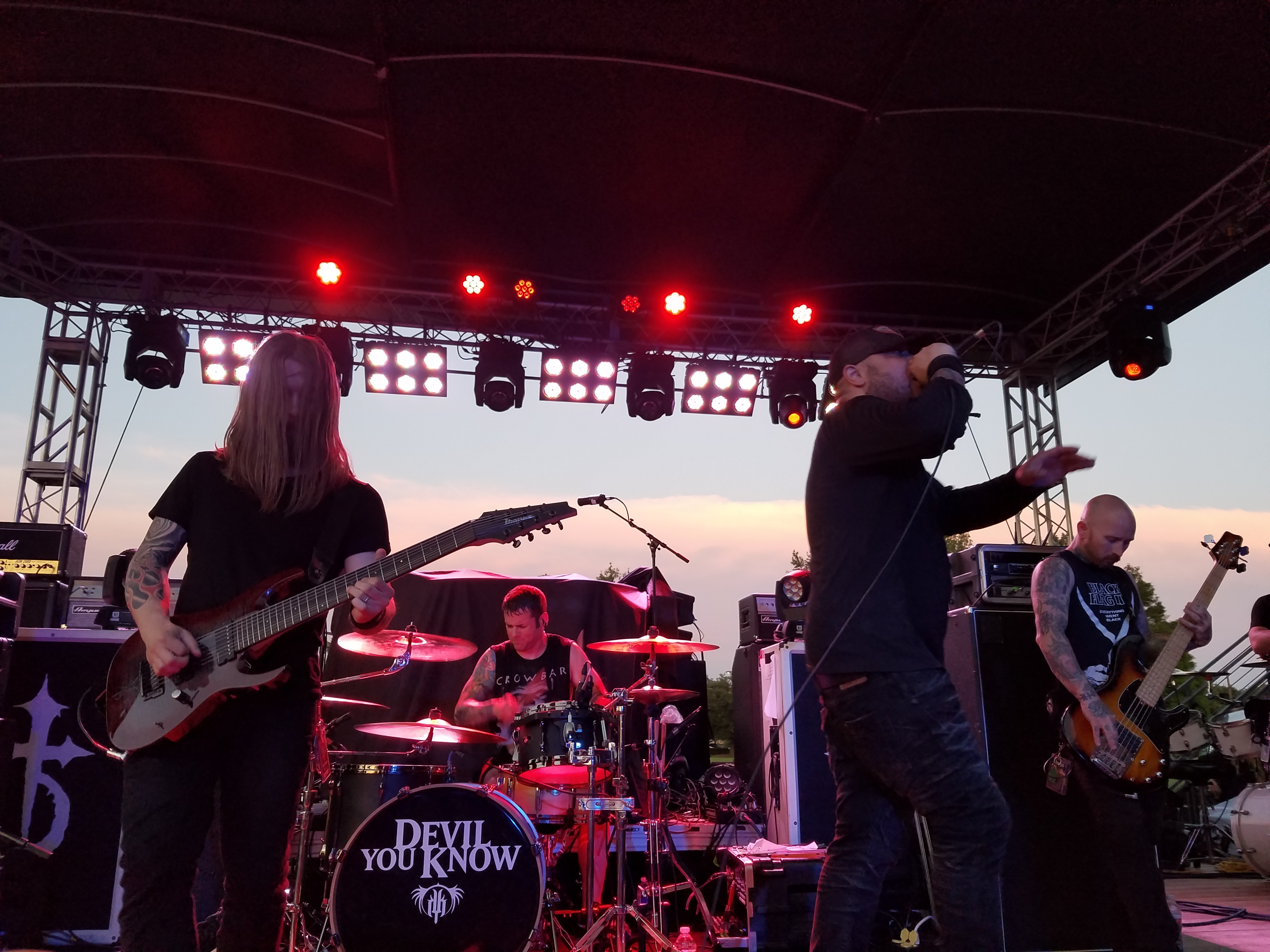
- Light the Torch performing in 2016 as Devil You Know

Background information
- Also known as: Devil You Know (2012–2017)
- Origin: Los Angeles, California, U.S.
- Genres: Melodic metalcore; alternative metal
- Years active: 2012–present
- Label: Nuclear Blast
- Members: Francesco Artusato; Howard Jones; Ryan Wombacher; Alex Rüdinger
- Past members: Mike Sciulara; Roy Lev-Ari; John Sankey; Kyle Baltus

Light the Torch (formerly Devil You Know) is an American metalcore supergroup formed in Los Angeles in 2012. They are currently signed to Nuclear Blast Records and have released four albums: two under the "Devil You Know" moniker (The Beauty of Destruction and They Bleed Red) and two under the "Light the Torch" name (Revival and You Will Be the Death of Me).

== History ==
=== Devil You Know (2012–2017) ===
The band started when guitarist Francesco Artusato (All Shall Perish, Hiss of Atrocities) and drummer John Sankey (Devolved) began jamming and writing together in 2012. After 30 to 40 song ideas were written the two decided to look for a vocalist. A couple of early demo recordings were sent to Howard Jones (Killswitch Engage, Blood Has Been Shed) who subsequently got interested and joined the band in late 2012. They named the band Devil You Know.

In early 2013, the band started recording with producer and ex-Machine Head guitarist Logan Mader (Gojira, Five Finger Death Punch).

On October 23, 2013, it was announced the band signed to Nuclear Blast. A day later the first demo song "Shut It Down" was released online through the band's Facebook page. On October 31, 2013, the demo was released officially through the label YouTube channel.

On December 19, 2013, it was announced that the band finished recording of the album and that bassist Ryan Wombacher (Bleeding Through) and guitarist Roy Lev-Ari (Hiss of Atrocities) joined the band.

In February–March 2014, the band took part in Soundwave Festival in Australia.

On March 5, 2014, the debut single "Seven Years Alone" was released. On March 27, 2014, the official music video for "Seven Years Alone" was released.

The band's debut album The Beauty of Destruction was mixed by Chris "Zeuss" Harris and was released on April 24 (EU), April 28 (UK) and April 29, 2014 (US and the rest of the world) via Nuclear Blast. It charted at No. 50 on the Billboard 200, selling nearly 6,000 units in the first week.

In April–June 2014, the band took part in Revolver Golden Gods Tour with Black Label Society, Down and Butcher Babies.

On October 31, 2014, a music video for "It's Over" was released. On March 9, 2015, the band released an official music video for "As Bright as the Darkness".

In June 2015, the band started recording the second album.

On September 10, 2015, the band released "Stay of Execution", the first single off the second album titled They Bleed Red which was released on November 6, 2015, via Nuclear Blast.

=== Light the Torch (2017–present) ===
On July 26, 2017, the band announced via social media that they had changed their name to Light the Torch without an explanation beyond, "A full statement will be made soon and a new album is very close to being completed. It's a new beginning and we couldn't be more excited."

Jones revealed in an interview on October 13, 2017, that the band had to change its name due to legal issues surrounding Sankey's departure from the band, and how the latter wanted to claim part copyright of the name. Mike Sciulara then joined the band as their new drummer replacing Sankey.

In a later interview on the changes the band went through Jones stated “There was just too much negativity. And so it needed to be cut, and an even better way to change the name, change the style of music, but it’s still the guys who were bonded together to do it. It’s a completely separate thing. And I don’t know how many of those songs (from Devil You Know) will ever see the light of day from us in a live setting, but it’s just part of the journey.“ In another interview he claimed that everything the band went through made them even closer stating “Just because of all the things we’ve endured, just because life happens, it’s more like we’re friends who work together now.”

Light the Torch released their first studio album Revival on March 30, 2018. It debuted at number 169 on the Billboard 200 and peaked at number 4 on the US Independent Albums and was met with positive reception.

The band played their first show under the new name on July 9, 2018, at Saint Vitus in Brooklyn, New York. During the Fall of that same year they served as the opening act for Trivium and Avatar on a North American tour.

In the Spring of 2019 Light the Torch went on a co headlining tour with Mark Morton, also making festival appearances the rest of the year.

On April 9, 2021, the band released their single "Wilting in the Light" on YouTube from their latest album You Will Be the Death of Me. The music video features Alex Rüdinger from Whitechapel as the band's new drummer. On June 4, 2021, they released another single titled "Let Me Fall Apart".

The band released their latest album, You Will Be the Death of Me, on June 25, 2021. On the day of the release the band held a livestream performing the album in its entirety. Jones stated that the album has a darker sound compared to their previous album Revival. Part of the album's dark theme was inspired by a car accident having injured guitarist Francesco Artusato that left him unable to play for some time, and his subsequent recovery.

In early 2022 the band toured in support of the album alongside Howard Jones old band Killswitch Engage.

== Band members ==
Current

- Francesco Artusato – lead guitar (2012–present), rhythm guitar (2012–2013, 2015–present), bass (2012–2013)
- Howard Jones – lead vocals (2012–present)
- Ryan Wombacher – bass, backing vocals (2013–present)
- Alex Rüdinger – drums (2021–present)

Touring

- John Boecklin – drums (2016)
- Nick Augusto – drums (2016–2017)
- Aaron Stechauner – drums (2022)

Former

- John Sankey – drums (2012–2016)
- Roy Lev-Ari – rhythm guitar (2013–2015)
- Mike Sciulara – drums (2018–2019)
- Kyle Baltus – drums (2019–2021)

Timeline

== Discography ==
=== Albums ===
List of albums with selected chart positions
Title	Year	Peak chart positions				
Title	Year	GER	SCO	SWI	UK	UK Rock
as Devil You Know
The Beauty of Destruction	2014	—	—	—	92	2
They Bleed Red	2015	—	—	—	— (Note: They Bleed Red reached number 36 on the UK Independent Albums Chart.)	13
as Light the Torch
Revival	2018	98	—	68	— (Note: While failing to make the full-week version of the UK Albums Chart, Revival reached number 100 on its midweek equivalent, Album Charts Update. It also reached at number 77 on the full-week UK Albums Sales chart, which removes streaming.)	4
You Will Be the Death of Me	2021	80	91	59	— (Note: While failing to make the full-week version of the UK Albums Chart, You Will Be the Death of Me reached number 100 on its midweek equivalent, Album Charts Update. It also reached at number 50 on the full-week UK Albums Sales chart, which removes streaming.)	10

=== Singles ===
List of singles, with selected chart positions
Title	Year	Peak chart positions		Album
Title	Year	US Main.	FIN Air.	Album
as Devil You Know
"Seven Years Alone"	2014	—	—	The Beauty of Destruction
"It's Over"	2015	—	—	The Beauty of Destruction
"Stay of Execution"	2015	—	—	They Bleed Red
"The Way We Die"	2015	—	—	They Bleed Red
as Light the Torch
"Die Alone"	2018	—	63	Revival
"Calm Before the Storm"	2018	—	—	Revival
"The Safety of Disbelief"	2018	32	—	Revival
"The Great Divide"	2019	—	—	Revival
"Wilting in the Light"	2021	33	—	You Will Be the Death of Me
"—" denotes a release that did not chart.

== Awards and nominations ==
=== Metal Hammer Golden Gods Awards ===
Year	Nominee / work	Award	Result
2014	Devil You Know	Best New Band	Won
