= Twelve Tribes (band) =

American metalcore band

- Origin: Dayton, Ohio, U.S.
- Genre: Metalcore
- Years active: 1998–2008
- Labels: Ferret Music; Eulogy Recordings; Alveran Records; Roadrunner Records
- Members: Adam Jackson; Andrew Corpus; Kevin Schindel; Jeremiah Stikeleather; Shane Shook
- Past members: Steve Brooks; Dave Mann; Matt Tackett; Jason Thompson; Alex Vernon

Twelve Tribes was an American metalcore band, from Dayton, Ohio, United States. Originally established in 1997, the group were signed to the independent record label Ferret Music. They were influenced by a cross cultural array of music such as punk rock, hip hop, classic rock, drum & bass, metal and hardcore.

== Biography ==
After recording two demos and playing shows in and around the mid-west, the band signed with South Florida's Eulogy Recordings. They released their debut full-length album As Feathers to Flowers and Petals to Wings in 1999, which gained nationwide attention and contributed to an upsurge in the melodic hardcore movement.

As Feather To Flowers... was followed shortly after by the EP Instruments. This musical offering was the antithesis of the traditional hardcore sound and somewhat distanced the band from mainstream fans. The band toured much of the following two years with then up and coming bands such as Poison the Well, Blood Has Been Shed, Every Time I Die, Drowningman, and Eighteen Visions. In late 2003 the band changed their name to "Prodigal Zoo", only to return to the Twelve Tribes moniker two months later.

The Rebirth of Tragedy had been two years in the making. It was produced by Killswitch Engage's vocalist Howard Jones. He commented about the band that "Without a doubt Twelve Tribes is unique; nobody has what they have, and knowing them as people as well as musicians made me jump at the opportunity to get involved. To me, this is what music is." Their Ferret Records debut is a documentation of their struggles, successes and personal growth as musicians.

It was this sold out overseas tour in 2005 with Killswitch Engage that set the band up for what would be a year of touring America. Twelve Tribes returned overseas two more times with 36 Crazyfists and then with their label mates Every Time I Die and A Life Once Lost.

In 2006, the band began touring again in the US and went again over to the UK and Europe with Hatebreed and Unearth promoting their October 3 release of Midwest Pandemic. They completed their January/February tour in the UK with 36 Crazyfists with huge success and also finished their headline tour in May in Europe with the same result. The band split-up in 2008, which reasons remains unknown.

Vocalist Adam Jackson worked with underground emcee/producer Necro for his album Death Rap. He also worked with Alaskan band 36 Crazyfists multiple times, providing vocals on "Clear the Coast" from their album, The Tide and Its Takers as well as the track "Anchors" from Collisions and Castaways. Jackson also performed guest vocals on the It Prevails track "Artisan" in 2011. In 2015, he can be heard on "Silencer", a track on Time and Trauma.

=== Influences ===
The band's influences include Faith No More, Metallica, Bloodlet, Candiria, Public Enemy, Converge, and Rage Against the Machine.

== Members ==
Current

- Adam Jackson – vocals
- Andrew Corpus – guitar
- Kevin Schindel – guitar
- Jeremiah Stikeleather – bass guitar
- Shane Shook – drums

Past

- Steve Brooks – guitar
- Dave Mann – drums
- Matt Tackett – bass guitar
- Jason Thompson – bass guitar
- Alex Vernon – drums
- Justin Gangle – drums
- Chris Scott Bartlett – guitar

== Discography ==
Date of Release	Title	Label
May 1, 1999	As Feathers to Flowers and Petals to Wings	Eulogy Recordings
August 8, 2000	Instruments	Eulogy Recordings
June 1, 2004	The Rebirth of Tragedy	Ferret Music
October 3, 2006	Midwest Pandemic	Ferret Music
