= The Beauty of Destruction =

Studio album by Devil You Know
- Released: April 25, 2014
- Recorded: 2012–2013
- Genre: Metalcore
- Length: 47:07
- Label: Nuclear Blast
- Producer: Logan Mader

Devil You Know chronology
The Beauty of Destruction (2014)	They Bleed Red (2015)

Singles from The Beauty of Destruction
- 1. "Shut It Down" Released: October 31, 2013; 2. "Seven Years Alone" Released: March 5, 2014; 3. "As Bright As The Darkness" Released: March 9, 2014; 4. "A New Beginning" Released: April 25, 2014; 5. "My Own" Released: September 15, 2014

Professional ratings
Review scores
Source	Rating
AllMusic	3.5/5 stars

The Beauty of Destruction is the debut studio album by American metalcore band Devil You Know, later known as Light the Torch. It was released on April 25, 2014, in Europe and on April 29 in North America, the UK, and France through Nuclear Blast. It was produced by Logan Mader and mixed by Zeuss. The music video was released by Nuclear Blast Records and featured members Ryan Wombacher on bass and Roy Lev-Ari on guitar. Artwork for the album was created by noted painter and illustrator Travis Smith.

== Track listing ==
All lyrics are written by Howard Jones; all music is composed by Francesco Artusato and John Sankey.

No.	Title	Length
1.	"A New Beginning"	4:08
2.	"My Own"	3:43
3.	"Embracing the Torture"	3:26
4.	"For the Dead and Broken"	3:26
5.	"Seven Years Alone"	3:43
6.	"It's Over"	3:53
7.	"A Mind Insane"	4:13
8.	"Crawl from the Dark"	4:16
9.	"The Killer"	3:40
10.	"I Am the Nothing"	4:12
11.	"Shut It Down"	3:51
12.	"As Bright as the Darkness"	4:30
Total length:		47:07

Vinyl LP bonus tracks
No.	Title	Length
13.	"Sacrifice"	4:00
Total length:		51:07

== Personnel ==
Devil You Know

- Howard Jones – vocals
- Francesco Artusato – guitar, bass guitar
- John Sankey – drums, percussion

Production

- Logan Mader – producer, composer
- Zeuss – mixing
- Ted Jensen at Sterling Sound, NYC – mastering
- Artwork by Travis Smith
