= John Sankey =

John Sankey may refer to:

- John Sankey, 1st Viscount Sankey, British lawyer, judge and politician
- John Sankey (drummer), Australian heavy metal drummer
