= The Tide and Its Takers =

Studio album by 36 Crazyfists
- Released: May 27, 2008
- Studios: Fisticuffs Studios (Portland, Oregon); Cloud City Studios (Detroit Michigan)
- Genres: Metalcore, alternative metal
- Length: 42:52
- Label: Ferret Music
- Producer: Steve Holt

36 Crazyfists chronology
Rest Inside the Flames (2006)	The Tide and Its Takers (2008)	Collisions and Castaways (2010)

Professional ratings
Review scores
Source	Rating
AbsolutePunk.net	75%
AllMusic	3.5/5 stars
Cosmos Gaming	unfavorable
Loudside	9/11
Rock Louder	2/5 stars

The Tide and Its Takers is the fourth studio album by American metalcore band 36 Crazyfists. It was released on May 27, 2008. The band filmed a music video for the album's first single, "We Gave It Hell", with director Soren, who has previously worked with the likes of Behemoth and Unearth. The video was released on YouTube on May 6, 2008. The album reached number 155 on the Billboard 200 in its first week as well as number four on the Top Heatseekers, number 23 on the Hard Rock Albums, and number 11 on the Independent Albums chart. The Tide and Its Takers marks the highest first-week sales ever for the band in the US (4,150 copies). The album also peaked at number 83 on the UK Albums Chart. This is the band's last release with longtime bassist Mick Whitney until their 2015 record Time and Trauma.

== Track listing ==
No.	Title	Length
1.	"The All Night Lights"	3:31
2.	"We Gave It Hell"	3:12
3.	"The Back Harlow Road"	4:10
4.	"Clear the Coast" (featuring Adam Jackson from Twelve Tribes)	3:22
5.	"Waiting on a War"	4:07
6.	"Only a Year or So..."	3:39
7.	"Absent Are the Saints"	3:50
8.	"Vast and Vague" (featuring Candace Kucsulain from Walls of Jericho)	4:14
9.	"When Distance Is the Closest Reminder"	3:45
10.	"Northern November"	5:00
11.	"The Tide and Its Takers"	4:02
12.	"Criminal Justice" (Satchel cover, bonus track)	4:22
Total length:		42:52

== Credits ==
- Brock Lindow – vocals
- Mick Whitney – bass
- Thomas Noonan – drums
- Steve Holt – guitar, background vocals
- Monte Conner – A&R
- Larry Mazer – management
- Daragh McDonagh – photography
- Andy Sneap – mastering, mixing
- Steve Holt – producer, engineer
- Sons of Nero – artwork

=== "Only a Year or So..." ===
- The female spoken word on "Only a Year or So..." is performed by a friend of the band from Portland, Oregon. The spoken word parts are letters sent between a wife and her husband who was fighting in Iraq with the army.
