= The Rebirth of Tragedy =

Studio album by Twelve Tribes
- Released: 2004
- Recorded: 2003
- Genre: Metalcore
- Label: Ferret
- Producer: Howard Jones

Twelve Tribes chronology
Instruments (2002)	The Rebirth of Tragedy (2004)	Midwest Pandemic (2006)

Professional ratings
Review scores
Source	Rating
Allmusic	link

The Rebirth of Tragedy is Twelve Tribes's second album.

== Track listing ==
1. "Post Replica"
2. "Baboon Music"
3. "Translation of Fixes"
4. "Venus Complex"
5. "Backburner"
6. "Chroma"
7. "The Train Bridge"
8. "Godshaped War"
9. "Luma"
10. "Flight of the Pathogen"

== Credits ==
- Adam Jackson - vocals
- Andrew Corpus - guitar
- Kevin Schindel - guitar
- Matt Tackett - bass guitar
- Shane Shook - drums
