= Rest Inside the Flames =

Studio album by 36 Crazyfists
- Released: June 10, 2006
- Recorded: October 2005 – January 2006
- Studio: Big Blue Meenie (Jersey City, New Jersey)
- Genres: Metalcore, post-hardcore, alternative metal
- Length: 42:36
- Labels: Roadrunner (international); DRT Entertainment (US)
- Producer: Sal Villanueva

36 Crazyfists chronology
A Snow Capped Romance (2004)	Rest Inside the Flames (2006)	The Tide and Its Takers (2008)

Professional ratings
Review scores
Source	Rating
AllMusic	4.5/5 stars
HardcoreSounds.net	4/5 stars
musicOMH.com	3/5 stars
Drowned in Sound	4/5 stars
Metalrage	8.5/10 stars
Loudside.com	11/11
PopMatters	5/10 stars
Blabbermouth.net	6.5/10 stars

Rest Inside the Flames is the third album by American metalcore band 36 Crazyfists. It was released in Australia on June 10, 2006 and in Europe on June 12, 2006. The album was released in the US on November 7 via the band's new North American label, DRT Entertainment. Almost two months prior to the album's official release date of June 12, the album was leaked and began appearing on P2P sites.

The album features guest vocals by ex-Killswitch Engage frontman Howard Jones on the track "Elysium", as well as Jonah Jenkins (vocalist of Milligram and ex-vocalist of Only Living Witness) on the track "We Cannot Deny". Crazyfists frontman Lindow was pleased with Jenkins appearance on the album and said, in an interview, "Only Living Witness was one of our favorite bands growing up, so we really wanted him to be on the record. Over the years, I made friends with him online, which is a little weird. But he lives in Boston so he came down to New Jersey when we were recording, and that was awesome."

The first single released from the album was "I'll Go Until My Heart Stops".

== Track listing ==
No.	Title	Length
1.	"I'll Go Until My Heart Stops"	3:45
2.	"Felt Through a Phone Line"	4:25
3.	"On Any Given Night"	3:38
4.	"Elysium" (featuring Howard Jones)	3:03
5.	"The Great Descent"	4:35
6.	"Midnight Swim"	3:43
7.	"Aurora"	3:54
8.	"Will Pull This in By Hand"	2:50
9.	"We Cannot Deny" (featuring Jonah Jenkins)	3:42
10.	"Between the Anchor and the Air"	3:28
11.	"The City Ignites"	3:23
Total length:		40:25

Bonus track
No.	Title	Length
12.	"Digging the Grave" (Faith No More cover)	2:55

Japanese edition bonus track
No.	Title	Length
12.	"Mother Mary" (Far cover)	2:09

== Personnel ==
- Brock Lindow – vocals
- Mick Whitney – bass
- Thomas Noonan – drums
- Steve Holt – guitar, background vocals, co-producer
- Tom Gomes – drums on "We Cannot Deny"
- Howard Jones – guest vocals on "Elysium"
- Jonah Jenkins – guest vocals on "We Cannot Deny"

Production

- Jeff Chenault – creative director
- Monte Conner – A&R
- Erin Farley – assistant engineer
- Larry Mazer – management
- Daragh McDonagh – photography
- Andy Sneap – mastering, mixing
- Arun Venkatesh – assistant engineer
- Sal Villanueva – producer, engineer

== Charts ==
Chart performance for Rest Inside the Flames
Chart (2006)	Peak position
Australian Albums (ARIA)	53
UK Albums (Official Charts)	71
