= Spirals (album) =

Studio album by Blood Has Been Shed
- Released: June 27, 2003
- Studio: Planet Z Studios in Hadley, MA
- Genre: Mathcore, Metalcore
- Length: 35:11
- Label: Ferret
- Producer: Zeuss; Blood Has Been Shed

Blood Has Been Shed chronology
Novella of Uriel (2001)	Spirals (2003)

Professional ratings
Review scores
Source	Rating
Allmusic	link
The PRP	3.5/5
Punk News	4/5 stars

Spirals is the third and final album by metalcore band Blood Has Been Shed. The album was released June 27, 2003 through Ferret Music. A music video was released for the song "She Speaks to Me."

== Track listing ==
All tracks are written by Blood Has Been Shed.

No.	Title	Length
1.	"Age of Apocalypse"	2:07
2.	"Prion"	2:23
3.	"Greetings from the Gallows"	2:34
4.	"She Speaks to Me"	2:33
5.	"Rainman"	2:37
6.	"Uatu"	3:49
7.	"The House of Fists"	1:11
8.	"Beatnik"	1:56
9.	"Beginner's Luck"	2:54
10.	"Technicolor Jackets"	2:54
11.	"Weeping Willow"	2:30
12.	"Call Waiting (John Doe Has the Upper Hand)"	2:25
13.	"Six Twelve"	3:22
14.	"Cortisone"	2:22

== Personnel ==
Blood Has Been Shed

- Howard Jones – lead vocals
- Corey Unger – guitar, backing vocals
- John Lynch – bass
- Justin Foley – drums

Additional personnel

- Zeuss – producer, engineer, mixing
- Jeff Lipton – mastering
- Jeff Gros – photography
- Asterisk Studio – art direction, design
