= Bitterness the Star =

Studio album by 36 Crazyfists
- Released: April 4, 2002
- Recorded: May 1–June 17, 2001
- Studios: Millbrook Studios (Millbrook, New York); Red Clay Studios (Suffern, New York)
- Genre: Nu metal
- Length: 46:35
- Label: Roadrunner
- Producers: Eddie Wohl, Rob Caggiano, Steve Regina

36 Crazyfists chronology
| Demo '99 (1999) | Bitterness the Star (2002) | A Snow Capped Romance (2004) |

Professional ratings
Review scores
| Source | Rating |
|---|---|
| AllMusic | 4/5 stars |
| PopMatters | Favorable |

Bitterness the Star is the debut major label album by American metalcore band 36 Crazyfists. It was released on April 4, 2002 through Roadrunner Records, and was produced by Eddie Wohl. "Slit Wrist Theory" was released as a single and is often censored to "Wrist Theory" on music channels to eliminate the self-harm reference. This is the only 36 Crazyfists album to bear a Parental Advisory sticker.

Singer Brock Lindow has stated that this release is his favorite 36 Crazyfists studio album. In an interview with the music magazine Kerrang! in 2007, he declared, "Bitterness will always remain my favourite album, no matter what".

== Background and recording ==
The majority of the songs were written in 1997–98, immediately after the release of the band's independent debut album In the Skin. In April 2001, 36 Crazyfists entered Millbrook Studios in Milbrook, New York with Eddie Wohl, Rob Caggiano and Steve Regina, all of Scrap 60 Productions. Recording commenced on May 1, 2001. On June 1, 2001, Skinlab vocalist Steev Esquivel flew up to Millbrook to record a guest appearance on "Bury Me Where I Fall". Three days later, the band left Millbrook and travelled to Red Clay Studios in Suffern, New York. The band finished recording on June 17, 2001.

== Track listing ==
All lyrics are written by Brock Lindow; all music is composed by 36 Crazyfists.

| No. | Title | Length |
|---|---|---|
| 1. | "Turns to Ashes" | 3:18 |
| 2. | "One More Word" (feat. Carl Severson of Nora) | 3:39 |
| 3. | "An Agreement Called Forever" | 3:23 |
| 4. | "Eightminutesupsidedown" | 3:17 |
| 5. | "Slit Wrist Theory" | 4:01 |
| 6. | "Bury Me Where I Fall" (feat. Steev Esquivel of Skinlab) | 3:35 |
| 7. | "Dislocate" | 3:46 |
| 8. | "Two Months from a Year" | 4:25 |
| 9. | "Chalk White" | 3:41 |
| 10. | "All I Am" | 4:30 |
| 11. | "Ceramic" | 3:03 |
| 12. | "Circle the Drain" | 3:42 |
| 13. | "Left Hand Charity" | 2:15 |
| Total length: | | 46:35 |

Special edition
| No. | Title | Length |
|---|---|---|
| 14. | "Crutch" | 5:28 |
| 15. | "Circle the Drain" (Demo) | 3:38 |
| 16. | "Chalk White" (Demo) | 3:18 |
| 17. | "Disarray" (Demo) | 3:00 |

- Tracks 15, 16 and 17 of the special edition are originally recorded on the '99 Demo.

== Personnel ==
=== 36 Crazyfists ===
- Brock Lindow – vocals
- Steve Holt – guitar, backing vocals
- Mick Whitney – bass
- Thomas Noonan – drums

=== Guests ===
- Carl Severson – additional vocals on "One More Word"
- Steev Esquivel – additional vocals on "Bury Me Where I Fall"

=== Production ===
- Eddie Wohl – producer, engineer, mixing
- Rob Caggiano – producer, engineer, mixing
- Steve Regina – producer, engineer, mixing
- Paul Orofino – engineer
- Ted Jensen – mastering
- Tom Simpson – media
- Monte Conner – A&R
- Daniel Moss – photography
- Brooke Fasani – live photos
