= Revival (Light the Torch album) =

Studio album by Light the Torch
- Released: March 30, 2018
- Recorded: 2017
- Genre: Alternative metal, melodic metalcore
- Length: 43:14
- Label: Nuclear Blast
- Producer: Josh Gilbert; Light the Torch

Light the Torch chronology
They Bleed Red (2015)	Revival (2018)	You Will Be the Death of Me (2021)

Singles from Revival
- 1. "Die Alone" Released: February 2, 2018; 2. "Calm Before the Storm" Released: February 23, 2018; 3. "The Safety of Disbelief" Released: March 30, 2018; 4. "The Great Divide" Released: September 24, 2019

Revival is the third studio album from the American metal band Light the Torch and also their first studio album since changing their name from Devil You Know.

The album sold around 5,000 copies in the United States in its first week of release.

Revival is the only album to feature the drummer Mike Sciulara.

== Background ==
The album was the first to be released following the band's name change due to legal issues surrounding former drummer John Sankey's departure from the band, and how the latter wanted to claim part copyright of the name. Mike Sciulara then joined the band as their new drummer replacing Sankey.

They finished the writing and recording, while their label didn’t even know they were working on an album. Jones stated “We did the whole thing completely under the radar.“

Jones has stated that he wrote the entire album while he was spending time outdoors “I wrote every bit of it outside when I was hiking or walking or running. I don’t really know why it happened that way, but it did.“

The album is seen as a brand new start for the group hence the name revival. In interviews Howard Jones stated that he wanted Light the Torch’s material to come from a more honest, less burdened place and that the album emerged from rediscovered passion. The album features Jones’ signature emotional intensity with accessible melodies and themes of resilience.

== Critical reception ==
Professional ratings
Review scores
Source	Rating
Distorted Sound	8/10 stars
Exclaim!	7/10 stars
Ghost Cult	7/10 stars
Rock 'N' Load	10/10 stars
Sputnik Music	2.5/5 stars

The album has received positive reviews from some music critics.

Max Morin writing for Exclaim! gave the album a 7/10 stating “with all the breakdowns and double-bass aerobics we've come to expect from metalcore's more mainstream side. Howard Jones's voice has lost none of its power or bravado and for a certain type of listener, Revival could be Christmas come early. Dan McHugh of Distorted sound added “Revival doesn’t display as much technical flair as it’s predecessors but it does maintain the potency and penchant for massive choruses which has become a staple of their arsenal. LIGHT THE TORCH have developed a no frills, straight to the point metal album which is hard to fault.

== Track listing ==
All lyrics are written by Howard Jones; all music is composed by Light the Torch.

No.	Title	Length
1.	"Die Alone"	3:52
2.	"The God I Deserve"	3:18
3.	"Calm Before the Storm"	3:55
4.	"Raise the Dead"	3:43
5.	"The Safety of Disbelief"	3:33
6.	"Virus"	3:37
7.	"The Great Divide"	3:16
8.	"The Bitter End"	3:22
9.	"Lost in the Fire"	4:12
10.	"The Sound of Violence"	2:35
11.	"Pull My Heart Out"	3:35
12.	"Judas Convention"	4:16
Total length:		43:14

== Personnel ==
Light the Torch

- Howard Jones – lead vocals
- Francesco Artusato – guitars, synthesizers
- Ryan Wombacher – bass, backing vocals
- Mike Sciulara – drums

Production

- Josh Gilbert – production, engineering
- Joseph McQueen – mixing, engineering
- Chris Gehring – mastering
- Hristo Shindov – photography
- Rob Kimure – layout
- Francesco Artusato – album artwork

== Charts ==
Chart (2018)	Peak position
US Billboard 200	169
US Hard Rock Albums	10
US Independent Albums	4
US Top Rock Albums	28
