= A Snow Capped Romance =

Studio album by 36 Crazyfists
- Released: March 16, 2004
- Recorded: 2003
- Studios: Wisner Productions (St. Cloud, Florida); Landmark Productions (Nacogdoches, Texas)
- Genre: Metalcore
- Length: 38:18
- Label: Roadrunner
- Producers: James Paul Wisner, Steve Holt

36 Crazyfists chronology
Bitterness the Star (2002)	A Snow Capped Romance (2004)	Rest Inside the Flames (2006)

Singles from A Snow Capped Romance
- 1. "At the End of August" Released: 6 March 2004; 2. "Bloodwork" Released: August 2004; 3. "Destroy the Map" Released: April 2005

Professional ratings
Review scores
Source	Rating
AllMusic	3/5 stars
Blabbermouth.net	6/10
HMV	Favorable
musicOMH.com	Favorable

A Snow Capped Romance is the second studio album by American metalcore band 36 Crazyfists. It was released on March 16, 2004, by Roadrunner Records. "At the End of August" and "Bloodwork" were released as singles, the latter of which was featured in the 2004 film Resident Evil: Apocalypse.

In 2016, Metal Hammer named A Snow Capped Romance one of the most underrated Roadrunner Records albums.

== Track listing ==
All lyrics are written by Brock Lindow; all music is composed by Steve Holt and Thomas Noonan.

No.	Title	Length
1.	"At the End of August"	3:57
2.	"The Heart and the Shape"	3:10
3.	"Bloodwork"	3:18
4.	"Kenai"	2:47
5.	"Skin and Atmosphere"	4:12
6.	"Song for the Fisherman"	1:27
7.	"With Nothing Underneath"	3:28
8.	"Destroy the Map"	3:47
9.	"Installing the Catheter"	3:51
10.	"Cure Eclipse"	3:32
11.	"Waterhaul"	4:49
Total length:		38:18

Japanese/iTunes bonus tracks
No.	Title	Length
12.	"Workhorse" (Cast Iron Hike cover)	4:09
13.	"Sad Lisa" (Cat Stevens cover)	3:51

== Personnel ==
=== 36 Crazyfists ===
- Brock Lindow – vocals
- Steve Holt – guitar, backing vocals and production
- Mick Whitney – bass
- Thomas Noonan – drums

=== Guests ===
- Raithon Clay – additional vocals on "Destroy the Map"
- Sarah Reeder – spoken word on "Installing the Catheter"

=== Production ===
- James Paul Wisner – production, engineering and editing
- Mark Green – assistant engineering and editing
- Andy Sneap – mixing and mastering
- Marc Loren – assistant engineering
- Norma Mendoza – vocal coaching
- Monte Conner – A&R
- Josh Rothstein – photography
- Berit Monsen-Keene – photography
