= Lanterns (36 Crazyfists album) =

Studio album by 36 Crazyfists
- Released: September 29, 2017
- Studio: High Voltage Sound (Portland, Oregon)
- Genre: Alternative metal, metalcore
- Length: 46:56
- Label: Spinefarm Records

36 Crazyfists chronology
Time and Trauma (2015)	Lanterns (2017)

Singles from Lanterns
- 1. "Death Eater" Released: July 27, 2017; 2. "Better to Burn" Released: August 17, 2017; 3. "Wars to Walk Away From" Released: September 22, 2017

Professional ratings
Review scores
Source	Rating
Ghost Cult Magazine	7/10
Louder Sound	3.5/5 stars

Lanterns is the seventh and final studio album by American metal band 36 Crazyfists. The album was released in the UK on September 29, 2017, and the band promoted it with a tour with DevilDriver and Cane Hill. Music videos were made and released for the singles "Better to Burn" and "Wars to Walk Away From". Vocalist Brock Lindow explained that the writing process helped him get over depression after a divorce from a 13-year marriage, and the results of his writing were "a lot more real and raw this time."

== Track listing ==
All lyrics are written by Brock Lindow; all music is composed by 36 Crazyfists.

No.	Title	Length
1.	"Death Eater"	4:18
2.	"Wars to Walk Away From"	3:44
3.	"Better to Burn"	4:04
4.	"Damaged Under Sun"	3:05
5.	"Sea & Smoke"	4:47
6.	"Where Revenge Ends"	2:29
7.	"Sleepsick"	3:53
8.	"Bandage for Promise"	3:47
9.	"Laying Hands"	4:00
10.	"Below the Graves"	3:57
11.	"Old Gold"	5:00
12.	"Dark Corners"	3:52
Total length:		46:56

Deluxe edition
No.	Title	Length
13.	"We Die Young" (Alice in Chains cover)	2:39
14.	"She/Angelfuck"	3:02
Total length:		52:37

== Personnel ==
- Brock Lindow – vocals
- Steve Holt – guitar, background vocals
- Mick Whitney – bass
- Kyle Baltus – drums
