= Blood Has Been Shed =

American metalcore band

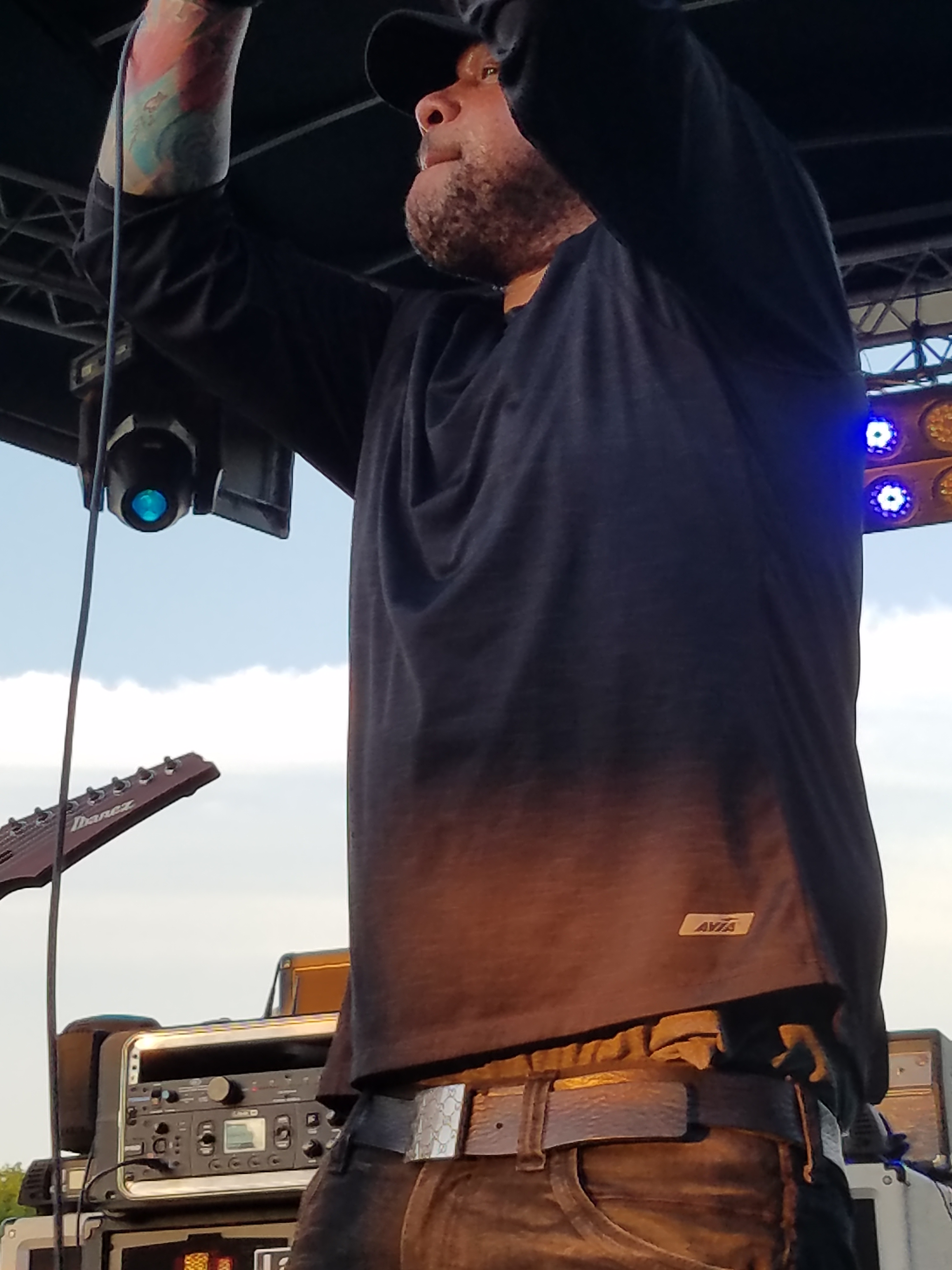
- Frontman Howard Jones in 2016

Background information
- Origin: Granby, Connecticut
- Genres: Metalcore, Mathcore
- Years active: 1997–2005
- Labels: Ferret, Roadrunner
- Past members: Howard Jones; Corey Unger; John Lynch; Justin Foley
- Website: www.roadrunnerrecords.co.uk/artist/Blood+Has+Been+Shed

Blood Has Been Shed was an American metalcore band based in Granby, Connecticut. The band came together in 1997 and has featured members of Killswitch Engage, Diecast, Light the Torch, Red Tide, Terror, Walls of Jericho, Bury Your Dead, The Acacia Strain, On Bodies, and As Friends Rust. Blood Has Been Shed has released three full-length albums—I Dwell on Thoughts of You (1998), Novella of Uriel (2001) and Spirals (2003)—and was signed to Ferret Music and Roadrunner Records. The band was a frequent performer at metal festivals Hellfest and the New England Metal and Hardcore Festival.

Though Blood Has Been Shed never announced a formal breakup, it is generally considered to be inactive since 2005. The band has not performed a concert since April 2005 (at the New England Metal and Hardcore Festival), has ceased to publish any news since August 2005 (the announcement of their cancelled UK mini-tour) and has not released material since October 2005 (Roadrunner Records' Japanese release of Spirals/Novella of Uriel double-album compact disc). The band's dissolution is usually attributed to two of its members' then-obligations to Killswitch Engage.

Blood Has Been Shed has announced several plans to perform reunion shows and release new material over the years, but none have come to fruition.

== History ==
The members of Blood Has Been Shed had previously come together under the name Release in 1993 and were based in Columbus, Ohio. In 1995, the band relocated to Granby, Connecticut (where guitarist Corey Unger was originally from) and renamed itself Driven. Driven recorded a sixteen-song self-titled album in 1996, which was self-released on cassette tape. One of the songs from this recording session was also used on a four-way split 7-inch vinyl with Bane, Capgun and The Rolemodels, released through Somers, Connecticut-based record label Solution Records in early 1997.

In December 1996, Driven's original drummer departed and the band opted to start a side-project named Veiled, which saw Driven's bassist John Lynch switch to playing drums. Veiled played a handful of shows throughout 1997. By the end of the year, the members decided to resume Driven, merging both Driven and Veiled songs into a single band, but opted for another name change. Blood Has Been Shed was officially started at the end of 1997. The band played its first show as Blood Has Been Shed on February 28, 1998, at the Hanover House in Meridan, Connecticut opening for Candiria, Ground Zero, Torn Between and Tinstarwill.

Blood Has Been Shed recorded their debut album, I Dwell on Thoughts of You, in 1998. It was self-released on compact disc in the summer of 1998, and was eventually picked up for distribution through Very Distribution, and later in 1999, by Ferret Music. One of their big breaks came when they opened for death metal band Nile at Club Infinity in Springfield, Massachusetts on April 18, 1999. After several line-up changes, the band recruited bassist Richard Thurston (formerly of Florida metalcore bands Timescape Zero and Culture), with whom they wrote and recorded their sophomore album Novella of Uriel. Its release was delayed considerably, during which time Thurston switched to guitar (the band recruiting bassist Joseph Krewko), then departed, and was replaced by future The Acacia Strain guitarist Daniel Daponde. Thurston immediately joined Diecast, and later played in such bands as One Nation Under, Terror, Walls of Jericho, On Bodies, and As Friends Rust. During the summer 2000, the band toured with Killswitch Engage.

Ferret Music ultimately released Novella of Uriel on February 7, 2001. The band toured heavily throughout 2001 and 2002, which included stretches of shows with Killswitch Engage, Twelve Tribes, Every Time I Die, Martyr A.D. and Eighteen Visions. Blood Has Been Shed also made their first of three appearances at Hellfest, performing on Sunday, July 8, 2001, on the Second Stage of Hellfest 2001.

In September 2001, drummer John Lynch returned to playing bass when Blood Has Been Shed recruited Justin Foley, formerly of Red Tide, on drums. The band then began writing and recording new material for a planned EP to be released in early 2002; this EP was however shelved. In April 2002, Blood Has Been Shed toured with Poison the Well, American Nightmare and From Autumn to Ashes.

In June 2002, Blood Has Been Shed's vocalist Howard Jones joined Killswitch Engage, replacing their original singer Jesse Leach. Blood Has Been Shed and Killswitch Engage both performed at Hellfest 2002 (Jones' first show with Killswitch Engage). Killswitch Engage performed on Friday, July 12, 2002, on the B Stage while Blood Has Been Shed performed on Sunday, July 14, 2002, on the C Stage. Killswitch Engage's heavy touring schedule and obligations to major record label Roadrunner Records forced Blood Has Been Shed to slow down considerably. Unger wrote most of the band's third release Spirals while Jones was touring with Killswitch Engage.

Spirals was released through Ferret Music on June 27, 2003 and the band briefly toured in support of the album with Shadows Fall, God Forbid, Walls of Jericho and Full Blown Chaos, whenever holes in Killswitch Engage's schedule permitted. Blood Has Been Shed also made their third and final appearance at Hellfest 2K3, performing on Friday, July 4, 2003, on Stage A. In mid-October 2003, the band filmed a music video for the single "She Speaks to Me" with director Jason Arambulo. The music video was filmed only a few days before Justin Foley joined Killswitch Engage as their new drummer, shortly before the recording of their album The End of Heartache. The music video for "She Speaks to Me" premiered on Fuse's television program Uranium on January 21, 2004. The music video was later included on Roadrunner Records' Various Artists DVD compilation Roadrage 2005, released on September 12, 2005.

Also in January 2004, Ferret Music signed a deal with Roadrunner Records to license Spirals for the United Kingdom. The Roadrunner Records re-issue was however delayed until Blood Has Been Shed was able to honor a tour of the United Kingdom. During the delay, the release was upgraded to a double-album compact disc release, combining Spirals with Novella of Uriel. Initially announced for release on March 28, 2005, Spirals/Novella Of Uriel was pushed back by a week to April 4, 2005, and featured an updated artwork comprising both original artworks. The band performed at the New England Metal and Hardcore Festival's Second Stage on Saturday, April 23, 2005 (this later turned out to be the band's last show).

Blood Has Been Shed announced a three-day mini-tour of the United Kingdom with dates in London, Manchester and Birmingham from September 28–30, 2005. The UK mini-tour was however cancelled on August 1, 2005, citing conflicts with Killswitch Engage's touring schedule. Killswitch Engage was however not booked to play any shows during the month of September 2005, nor for the first half of October 2005. On October 12, 2005, Roadrunner Records released the Spirals/Novella of Uriel double-album compact disc set in Japan. The Japanese release coincided with Killswitch Engage's Taste of Chaos Tour which took them to Japan and was part of a 3-CD promotional campaign, paired with Killswitch Engage's The End of Heartache and Killswitch Engage remastered re-issues. The band did not announce any formal breakup and no news have since been published.

== Band members ==
Final members

- Howard Jones – vocals (1997–2005)
- Corey Unger – lead guitar, backing vocals (1997–2005), rhythm guitar (2005)
- John Lynch – bass (1998–1999, 2001–2005), drums (1997–2001)
- Justin Foley – drums (2001–2005)

Former members

- Shane Uras – drums (1997)
- Chris Alibrio – bass (1997–1998)
- Todd Beaton – rhythm guitar (1997–2000)
- Samson Contompasis – bass (1999)
- Richard Thurston – bass (1999–2000), rhythm guitar (2000)
- Joseph Krewko – bass (2000)
- Daniel Daponde – rhythm guitar (2000–2001), bass (2001)
- Dave Sharpe – rhythm guitar (2001)
- David Sroka – rhythm guitar (2001)
- Brendan MacDonald – rhythm guitar (2001–2004)
- Josh Venn – rhythm guitar (2004–2005)

Timeline

== Discography ==
=== Studio albums ===
- I Dwell on Thoughts of You (1998)
- Novella of Uriel (2001)
- Spirals (2003)

=== Compilation albums ===
- Spirals/Novella of Uriel (2005)

=== Singles ===
- "She Speaks to Me" (2004)
