= Midwest Pandemic =

Studio album by Twelve Tribes
- Released: October 3, 2006
- Recorded: 2005
- Genre: Metalcore
- Length: 43:10
- Label: Ferret
- Producer: Andreas Magnusson, Twelve Tribes

Twelve Tribes chronology
The Rebirth of Tragedy (2004)	Midwest Pandemic (2006)

Professional ratings
Review scores
Source	Rating
Allmusic	link

Midwest Pandemic is Twelve Tribes's third and final full-length album. They continue to follow the same style as their previous albums by using different or complex time signatures instead of common time.

The album was rated 3.5 out of five stars by Eduardo Rivadavia of AllMusic, who wrote that "Twelve Tribes manage to convey a powerful impact without the bombastic approach normally relied upon by many of their peers -- and that's yet another signal of their talent."

== Track listing ==
1. "National Amnesia" – 1:54
2. "Muzzle Order" - 3:34
3. "Televangelist" - 2:36
4. "Pagan Self Portrait" - 4:12
5. "History Versus The Pavement" - 3:30
6. "Monarch Of Dreams" - 2:11
7. "Librium" - 3:54
8. "Verona" - 2:53
9. "The Nine Year Tide" - 5:46
10. "Midwest Pandemic" - 4:10
11. "The Recovery (In Three Parts) I. God Bless You, Good Thief, II. Towers & Vectors, III. Bridge To The Sun" - 8:51

== Videos ==
A music video was produced for the track "Muzzle Order".

== Credits ==
- Adam Jackson - vocals
- Andrew Corpus - guitar
- Kevin Schindel - guitar
- Matt Tackett - bass guitar
- Shane Shook - drums
