= You Will Be the Death of Me =

Studio album by Light the Torch
- Released: June 25, 2021
- Recorded: 2020–2021
- Genre: Alternative metal, metalcore
- Length: 42:48
- Label: Nuclear Blast
- Producer: Josh Gilbert; Light the Torch

Light the Torch chronology
| Revival (2018) | You Will Be the Death of Me (2021) |

Singles from You Will Be the Death of Me
- 1. "Wilting in the Light" Released: April 9, 2021; 2. "More Than Dreaming" Released: May 8, 2021; 3. "Let Me Fall Apart" Released: June 6, 2021; 4. "Death of Me" Released: January 29, 2022; 5. "Become the Martyr" Released: 2022

Professional ratings
Review scores
| Source | Rating |
|---|---|
| Blabbermouth.net | 8/10 |
| Distorted Sound | 7/10 |
| Kerrang! | 3/5 |
| Louder Sound | 3/5 stars |
| Noizze | 8/10 |
| Sputnikmusic | 3.1/5 |

You Will Be the Death of Me is the fourth studio album from American metalcore band Light the Torch (second album under the new band name). Music videos were made for the singles "Wilting in the Light", "More Than Dreaming", and "Death of Me". A livestream full performance of the album took place on June 25, 2021, the day of its release.

Vocalist Howard Jones has stated that the album has a darker sound compared to their previous album Revival. Part of the album's dark theme was inspired by a car accident having injured guitarist Francesco Artusato that left him unable to play for some time, and his subsequent recovery.

== Track listing ==
All lyrics are written by Howard Jones; all music is composed by Francesco Artusato.

| No. | Title | Writer(s) | Length |
|---|---|---|---|
| 1. | "More Than Dreaming" | | 3:09 |
| 2. | "Let Me Fall Apart" | | 3:27 |
| 3. | "End of the World" | | 3:17 |
| 4. | "Wilting in the Light" | | 3:43 |
| 5. | "Death of Me" | | 3:23 |
| 6. | "Living With a Ghost" | | 3:37 |
| 7. | "Become the Martyr" | | 3:45 |
| 8. | "Something Deep Inside" | | 3:31 |
| 9. | "I Hate Myself" | | 3:41 |
| 10. | "Denying the Sin" | | 3:35 |
| 11. | "Come Back to the Quicksand" | | 3:06 |
| 12. | "Sign Your Name" | Terence Trent D'Arby | 4:34 |
| Total length: | | | 42:48 |

== Personnel ==
Light the Torch

- Howard Jones – lead vocals
- Francesco Artusato – guitars, synthesizers
- Ryan Wombacher – bass, backing vocals
- Alex Rüdinger – drums

Production

- Josh Gilbert – production, engineering
- Joseph McQueen – mixing, engineering
- Ted Jensen – mastering, engineering
- Rob Kimura – layout
