= As Feathers to Flowers and Petals to Wings =

Album by Twelve Tribes

Studio album by Twelve Tribes
- Released: May 1, 1999
- Recorded: 1999
- Genre: Metalcore
- Label: Eulogy

Twelve Tribes chronology
As Feathers to Flowers and Petals to Wings (1999)	Instruments (2002)

As Feathers to Flowers and Petals to Wings is Twelve Tribes' first album.

== Track listing ==
1. "Strings" - (3:49)
2. "As Ghosts Are Given to Me" - (4:08)
3. "Blowing Kisses" - (2:59)
4. "Still" - (1:37)
5. "Then Days Away" - (2:32)
6. "Killing Tonight for Every Love's Money" - (4:21)
7. "Faith, Hope's Dirty Knife" - (3:12)
8. "Mr. Bear" - (11:04)
9. "Abaddon" - (5:48)
10. "The Devil's Chord" - (2:39)

== Credits ==
- Adam Jackson - vocals
- Andrew Corpus - guitar
- Kevin Schindel - guitar
- Matt Tackett - bass guitar
- Shane Shook - drums
