= Howard Jones (American singer) =

American metal vocalist (born 1970)

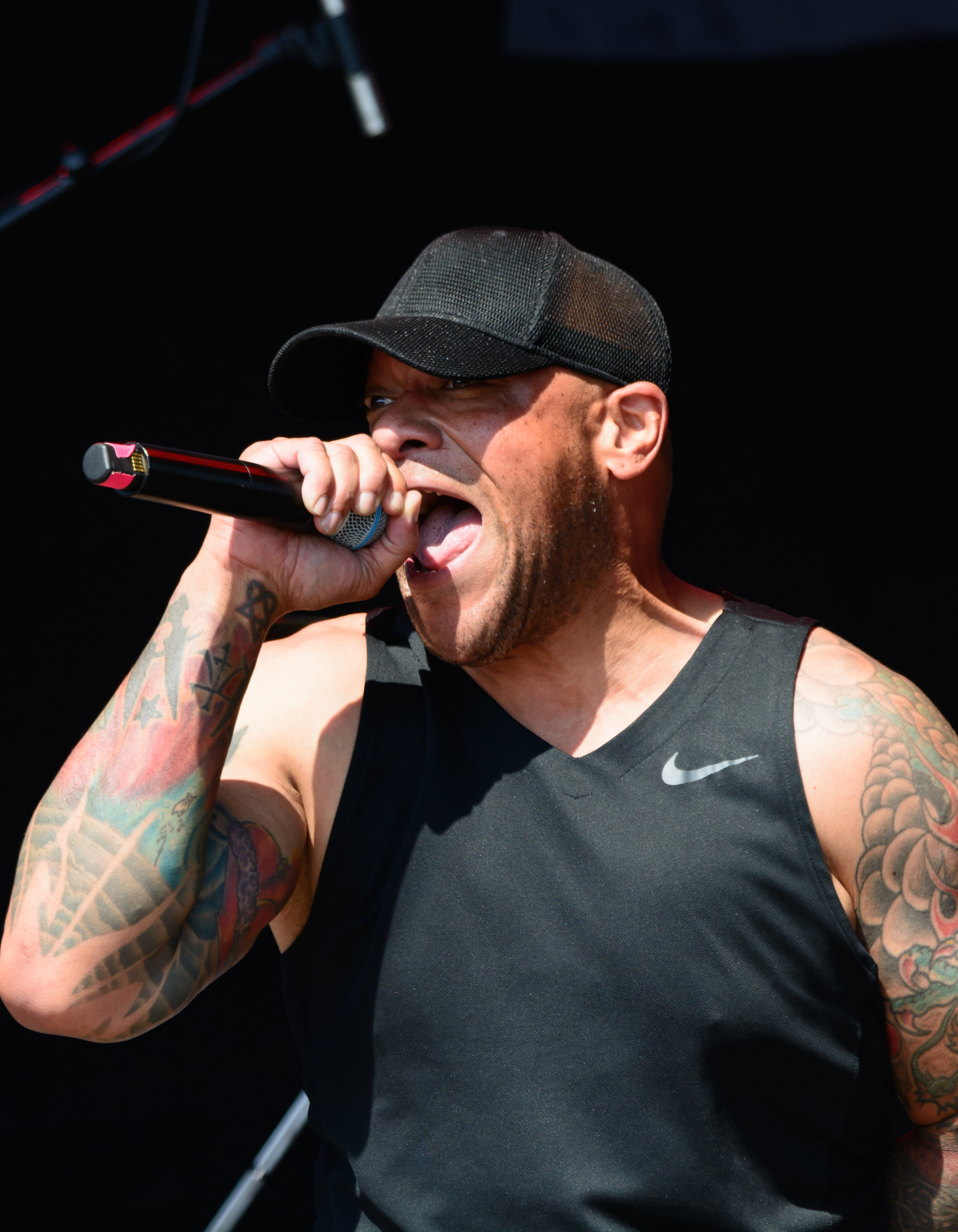
- Jones in 2018

Background information
- Born: July 20, 1970 (age 56)
- Origin: Columbus, Ohio, U.S.
- Genres: Metalcore; melodic metalcore; alternative metal
- Occupations: Singer; songwriter
- Years active: 1996–present
- Member of: Burn Eternal; Light the Torch; SION
- Formerly of: Killswitch Engage; Blood Has Been Shed

Howard Sion Jones (born July 20, 1970) is an American metalcore vocalist best known as the former lead singer of Killswitch Engage and Blood Has Been Shed. He is the current vocalist of Light the Torch, formerly known as Devil You Know, and SION with YouTuber/guitarist Jared Dines.

Jones' vocal performances have been described as "emotive and strident", and he has been referred to as "one of metalcore's finest singers". In 2023, Jake Richardson of Loudwire included him in his list of the "10 Best Clean Singers in Metalcore". In 2025, Stephen Andrew Galiher of Vice included him in his list of "4 Metal Vocalists Who Mastered Both Screaming and Singing".

== Early years ==
Born in Columbus, Ohio, in 1970, Jones quickly became interested in metal. He has stated that his journey into heavier music came from one of his high school friends: “I’m getting exposed to a lot of music. I listened to radio and stuff like that all the time. But then he’s the one that really exposed me to metal and death metal, just all that. So it was kind of him. Age of 14 or 15, he’s just got tapes and CDs and I just started absorbing it. I just loved it. That was kind of it. I think it was like '85 when we started listening to Stryper. That time you’re just pulling from all this stuff. So I’m watching MTV, but I’m still listening to everything. If I can get my ears on it I’m absorbing it. That was a good time for me.” He would often search for underground bands to listen to. During his high school years, he would always listen to something while walking in the hallways. During his teen years, Jones started to suffer from anxiety and depression.

== Career ==
Jones' love for heavy music led to him making music in the underground band Driven in 1996, releasing a single album. He later performed with Blood Has Been Shed from 1997 to 2005, releasing 3 studio albums.

=== Killswitch Engage ===
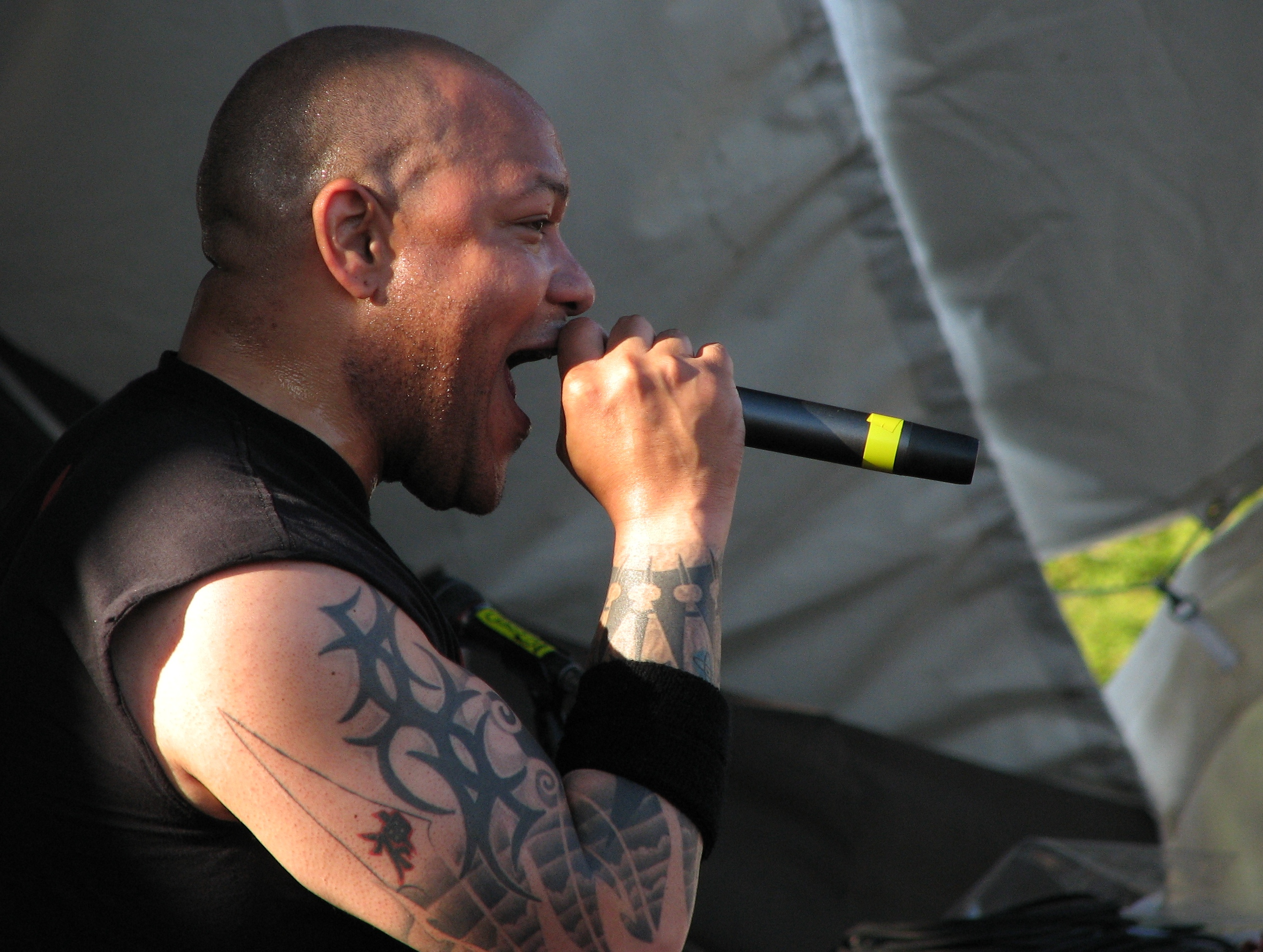
Jones performing during the Warped tour in 2007

In 2002, after hearing about Jesse Leach's departure, Jones contacted Killswitch Engage and tried out for them. Jones was then accepted by the band, beating out Philip Labonte of All That Remains. Jones then had to quickly memorize seven songs for his debut at the 2002 Hellfest. During his time with Killswitch Engage, they released the gold-certified album The End of Heartache, the platinum-certified As Daylight Dies, as well as a second self-titled album which was their biggest commercial success at that point, peaking at number 7 on the Billboard 200 along with becoming their first to top the US Hard Rock Albums Chart. He and the band also contributed to the God of War: Blood & Metal soundtrack with the song “My Obsession”. Jones' lyrics introduced a more introspective and emotionally resonant tone than previous records, which helped broaden the band’s appeal and emotional range.

During the band's 2010 winter tour, Jones temporarily stepped away to deal with personal issues related to his mental health. Jones then officially left the band after nearly ten years in 2012, but remained a close friend. He would go on to collaborate with them again for the single "The Signal Fire" from their album Atonement. Jones still makes sporadic appearances when Killswitch Engage goes on tour, surprising crowds and singing alongside Leach.

Leach has praised Jones for elevating the band’s mainstream reach, spotlighting The End of Heartache as the turning point for the band’s global impact.

=== Devil You Know / Light the Torch ===
Jones started Devil You Know with guitarist Francesco Artusato (All Shall Perish) and drummer John Sankey (Devolved, Fear Factory and Divine Heresy). Billed as a supergroup, they released two albums, The Beauty of Destruction (2014) and They Bleed Red (2015). Following Sankey's departure and his attempt to claim the copyright of the band's name, the rest of the band members started again with a fresh name, Light the Torch, with the addition of a new drummer. Jones stated "There was just too much negativity. And so it needed to be cut, and an even better way to change the name, change the style of music, but it’s still the guys who were bonded together to do it. It’s a completely separate thing. And I don’t know how many of those songs [from Devil You Know] will ever see the light of day from us in a live setting, but it’s just part of the journey." Light the Torch then released Revival in 2018, with Jones claiming he felt a renewed love for music. In 2021, they released their second record, You Will Be the Death of Me.

=== Other projects and appearances ===
In 2020, Jones released a cover of Lynyrd Skynyrd's song "Simple Man". It received 600,000 views by June 2021, with Jones stating that he didn't expect the reception.

In March 2021, Jones joined with heavy metal YouTuber Jared Dines and producer Hiram Hernandez to release "The Blade" as part of a new project named Sion.

On December 3, 2024, Jones via his Instagram confirmed that he and former Killswitch Engage bandmate Adam Dutkiewicz were almost finished mixing a debut album for their new band called Burn Eternal. In July 2025, Jones stated that he started working on a solo album.

On 5 November 2026, the first Burn Eternal single, Wounds I've Made, was released digitally.

Jones has also filled in for other bands, such as Trivium and Five Finger Death Punch, during live performances.

== Lyrical themes and style ==
Jones' lyrics touch upon emotions, inner strength and overcoming obstacles mentally. His singing style is often described as emotional, contributing significantly to making a impactful sound. While in his first band Blood Has Been Shed Jones used screaming vocals with very little clean vocals. However While in Killswitch Engage, he would continue to use screaming vocals and growls, however he would begin to incorporate more clean singing. Andrew Galiher of Vice wrote on Jones’s singing ability’s stating "Howard Jones is almost an anomaly. Like, the way his singing voice is so clean and powerful, and then his scream is just incredibly piercing It’s actually fucking crazy".

He has stated that he doesn’t like explaining his lyrics and likes to leave them up to interpretation: “I’m just that dude. I want to leave it up to interpretation. It takes all the fun out of it if I go through all of the explanations. Some stuff is pretty obvious and other stuff you can figure out [...] I kind of like that you can take what you like out of lyrics.”

He stated "I just kind of write what comes man, it all depends on where I’m at and where the music is. I never know what’s going to happen when I start writing. I just try to write what fits and it’s not like I have a particular theme in mind when I start writing, or sometimes it kind of is that way.”

In an interview with Loudwire, he claimed that while writing music, he tends to not consume any other entertainment: “I'm not listening to other music, I'm not really watching anything. [Music is] all I'm thinking about it and I can't help it, so that obsessive part of me... I'm hearing demo music, get my sleep, I'm waking up, I'm hearing that stuff and it just overtakes me. That's why I have to separate my life at times because I get way too obsessed with music.”

== Personal life ==
Jones is an avid fisherman and owns property on the Red River of the North in Manitoba, Canada. He is a frequent guest on Jamey Jasta's podcast on the GaS Digital Network. Jones left Killswitch Engage in early 2012 to allow himself to manage his type 2 diabetes, which was worsened by a hectic touring lifestyle. In 2014, Jones stated that his diabetes put him in a coma for three days. He has since gotten his diabetes under control and has started exercising, along with reshaping his diet.

On the aspect of religion Jones stated in an interview with Metal Hammer "I definitely have my beliefs and I was definitely raised religiously, but, again, this isn’t really something that I talk about very much because it is one of the most volatile conversations that you can have with a person or with a group."

Although formerly straight edge, Jones now shares a passion for medical cannabis with friend and fellow Killswitch Engage frontman Jesse Leach.

=== Mental health ===
In 2015, Jones revealed that he had struggled with anxiety and depression as a result of bipolar disorder for a long time, which had been worsened by his rise to fame in Killswitch Engage. He revealed that he had come close to committing suicide in 2009, when he had aimed a .44 Magnum revolver at his head in his apartment in Connecticut, and that the police had intervened after being notified by a concerned neighbor. Jones stated "I was going insane. It never occurred to me to get help. For years, I just tried to fight through it and I was driving those guys berserk. My anxiety was building and building, and near the end, there were a lot of times I’d sit in the back of the bus or lie in my bunk for hours on end without speaking to anyone." In 2018, he teamed up with his former band to raise awareness for mental health; the resulting song "The Signal Fire" appears on the 2019 album Atonement.

== Awards and accolades ==
During Jones' tenure with Killswitch Engage, the band won a handful of awards, with The End of Heartache winning best album at the 2004 Metal Hammer Golden Gods Awards along with the band being nominated for the best international act. The title track was also nominated for best metal performance at the Grammys in 2005.

In 2007, Killswitch Engage won Best International Band at that year's Metal Hammer Golden God Awards. That same year, the band also took home both Most Outstanding Metal/Hardcore Band of the Year and Act of the Year at the Boston Music Awards. As Daylight Dies was also nominated for album of the year. Individually, Jones was nominated for the National Male Vocalist of the Year.

In 2010, the band's self titled album won Best International Album at the Bandit Rock Awards.

In 2014, Jones and his new band Devil You Know (now known as Light the Torch) won the Best New Band award at that year’s Metal Hammer Golden God awards.

In 2023, Loudwire put Jones on their list of the top ten “Best Clean Singers in Metalcore”. In 2025, Revolver included Jones in their list of "16 Greatest Replacement Singers in Heavy-Music History".

== Discography ==
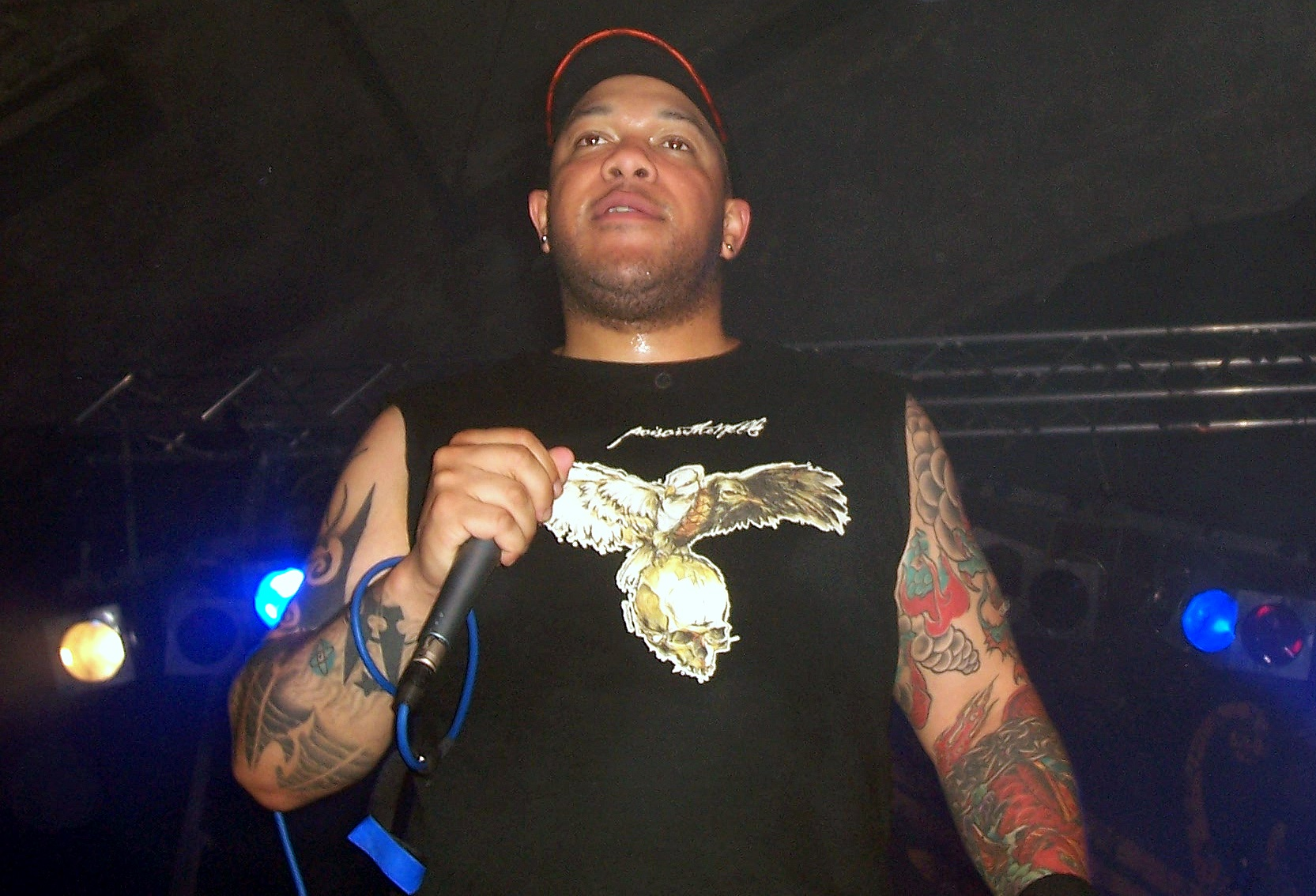
Jones in 2005

Blood Has Been Shed

- I Dwell on Thoughts of You (September 21, 1999, Ferret Records)
- Novella of Uriel (February 20, 2001, Ferret Records)
- Spirals (March 11, 2003, Ferret Records)

Killswitch Engage

- The End of Heartache (May 11, 2004, Roadrunner Records)
- As Daylight Dies (November 21, 2006, Roadrunner Records)
- Killswitch Engage (June 30, 2009, Roadrunner Records)
- “My Obsession” (March 2, 2010, God of War: Blood & Metal, Roadrunner Records)

Light the Torch (formerly Devil You Know)

- The Beauty of Destruction (April 25, 2014, Nuclear Blast)
- They Bleed Red (November 6, 2015, Nuclear Blast)
- Revival (March 30, 2018, Nuclear Blast)
- You Will Be the Death of Me (June 25, 2021, Nuclear Blast)

SION

- SION (November 26, 2021, Independent)

=== Guest appearances ===
- Fragment – Answers ("Inertia") *First ever guest appearance
- 36 Crazyfists – Rest Inside the Flames ("Elysium")
- Demon Hunter – Summer of Darkness ("Our Faces Fall Apart")
- Eighteen Visions – Vanity ("One Hell of a Prize Fighter")
- Roadrunner United – All-Star Sessions ("The Dagger")
- Throwdown – Vendetta ("The World Behind")
- Ill Bill – The Hour of Reprisal ("Babylon")
- Every Time I Die – Last Night in Town ("Punch-Drunk Punk Rock Romance")
- Believer – Gabriel ("The Brave")
- Asking Alexandria – From Death to Destiny ("Until the End") *First guest appearance since leaving Killswitch Engage.
- Within Temptation – Hydra ("Dangerous")
- Jasta – The Lost Chapters ("Chasing Demons")
- Violent New Breed – Bad Reputation ("Bury Me")
- Killswitch Engage – Atonement ("The Signal Fire")
- Jasta – The Lost Chapters Volume 2 ("Heaven Gets What It Wants")
- Crobot – Rat Child ("Kiss it Goodbye")
- Eyes Set to Kill – Damna ("Face the Rain")
- Ov Sulfur – The Burden Ov Faith ("Wide Open")
- ONI – The Silver Line ("Aura")
- Crobot – "Obsidian". September 13, 2024
- Mark Morton – Ether EP ("Love My Enemy")
- Body Count – Merciless ("Live Forever")
- CULT – Cult Of The Lamb (Hymns of Unholy)
