= Collisions and Castaways =

Studio album by 36 Crazyfists
- Released: July 27, 2010
- Studio: Fisticuffs Studios (Portland, Oregon)
- Genre: Metalcore, alternative metal
- Length: 44:52
- Label: Ferret, Roadrunner
- Producer: Steve Holt

36 Crazyfists chronology
The Tide and Its Takers (2008)	Collisions and Castaways (2010)	Time and Trauma (2015)

Professional ratings
Review scores
Source	Rating
AllMusic	3.5/5 stars
Sputnikmusic	2.5/5

Collisions and Castaways is the fifth studio album by American metalcore band 36 Crazyfists. The album was released in the UK on July 26, 2010 and in the rest of the world on July 27, 2010. The album sold around 3,300 copies in the United States in its first week of release, and debuted at number 161 on the Billboard 200 chart.

The album features guest appearances from Twelve Tribes frontman Adam Jackson, Raithon Clay of Plans to Make Perfect, and Brandon Davis from Across the Sun. Production duties for the album were handled by the band's guitarist Steve Holt. It is the final album to feature original drummer Thomas Noonan and the only release to include bassist Brett Makowski.

== Overview ==
Collisions and Castaways was written and recorded between October 2009 and May 2010. It follows the band's DVD Underneath a Northern Sky and is the band's second album to feature guitarist Steve Holt producing and Andy Sneap handling the final mix.

Vocalist and lyricist Brock Lindow has said "If this was the end of the band, this record is exactly what I wanted our band to do at one time, Maybe a lot of people will think we're just metalcore, but it's so much more than that. It's a heavy record with some big choruses and everything we've been about for a long time with a cool metal feel to it that I've been wanting."

The album's first single is "Reviver".

== Critical reception ==
Jen Rochester of The NewReview gave the album a 4.5 out of 5 and stated "I really can't find anything to complain about with Collisions and Castaways. This album is 36 Crazyfists at their best. Quite frankly, I cannot think of a better way to spend ten bucks."

== Track listing ==
No.	Title	Length
1.	"In the Midnights"	5:34
2.	"Whitewater"	3:21
3.	"Mercy and Grace"	3:50
4.	"Death Renames the Light"	3:34
5.	"Anchors"	5:40
6.	"Long Roads to Late Nights"	1:46
7.	"Trenches"	3:36
8.	"Reviver"	3:42
9.	"Caving in Spirals"	4:21
10.	"The Deserter"	4:22
11.	"Waterhaul II"	5:04
Total length:		44:52

Deluxe edition bonus tracks
No.	Title	Length
12.	"In the Midnights" (Live at Graspop)	5:10
13.	"The All Night Lights" (Live at Graspop)	3:26

== Personnel ==
- Brock Lindow – vocals
- Steve Holt – guitar, background vocals
- Brett "Buzzard" Makowski – bass
- Thomas Noonan – drums

== Charts ==
Chart performance for Collisions and Castaways
Chart (2010)	Peak position
Australian Albums (ARIA)	47
UK Albums (OCC)	85
US Billboard 200	161
