= 36 Crazyfists =

American metal band

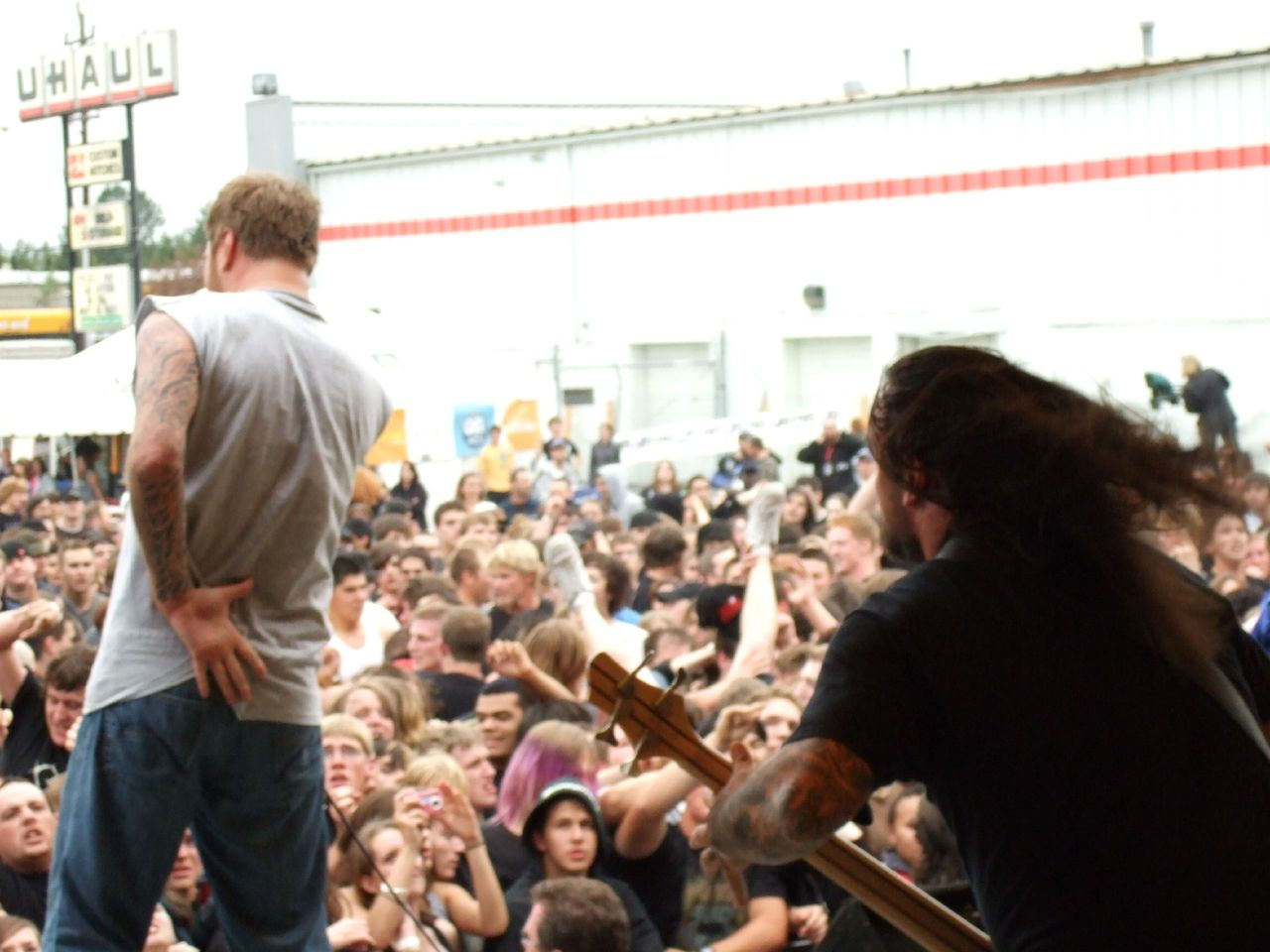
- 36 Crazyfists headlining the Summer Meltdown Festival in midtown Anchorage, 2007

Background information
- Origin: Anchorage, Alaska, U.S.
- Genres: Metalcore; alternative metal; post-hardcore; nu metal (early)
- Years active: 1994–2021
- Labels: Spinefarm; Roadrunner; DRT Entertainment; Ferret
- Members: Brock Lindow; Steve Holt; Mick Whitney; Kyle Baltus
- Past members: JD Stuart; Ryan Brownell; Thomas Noonan; Brett Makowski

36 Crazyfists was an American metalcore band formed in Anchorage, Alaska, in 1994. The band's name comes from the Hong Kong martial arts film The 36 Crazy Fists (1977). To date they have released eight studio albums.

In 2013, the band was featured in an NME article titled "28 Nu-Metal Era Bands You Probably Forgot All About".

== History ==
=== Early years (1994–1999) ===
36 Crazyfists formed in 1994 in Anchorage, Alaska. The original members were vocalist Brock Lindow, guitarists Steve Holt and Ryan Brownell, bassist JD Stuart, and drummer Thomas Noonan. Holt is from Kenai, and Lindow spent much of his childhood there. Lindow, Brownell, Stuart, and Noonan are all from Anchorage.

36CF originated from the remains of three local bands: Grin, Hessian, and Broke. JD Stuart played in Grin, Brock Lindow in Hessian, and Steve Holt and Ryan Brownell in Broke. One of the circumstances influencing the formation of 36CF was the murder of Broke's drummer Duane Monsen. On February 25, 1994, Broke played a set at the Underground bar in Anchorage. Later that night there was an altercation between Monsen and another patron, and when the dispute moved outside of the building, Monsen was stabbed in the throat. He died three days later at age 27. In the wake of this tragedy, Monsen's friends organized a benefit concert to raise funds for his family. Monsen's protégé Thomas Noonan played the drums at this show and the musicians decided that they were an excellent match. Since that time the members have considered it the de facto first 36CF performance.

36CF released their first EP, Boss Buckle, in 1995 on cassette. At that time the band's local popularity was rising quickly and the tape became a rarity, with the entire printing sold or given away as promos. On May 13, 1996, 36CF opened for Primus at Egan Center in Anchorage. This concert was particularly interesting in a few ways. This was one of the first times 36CF performed before an audience of thousands, though many locals were already familiar with the band's music. This was also the last show of Primus' Punchbowl tour and the last show for drummer Tim Alexander before his first hiatus from Primus.

36CF were planning to relocate to Tacoma, Washington, in search of professional recording contracts when another tragedy struck. On June 16, 1996, JD Stuart died in a car collision at age 23. This was a huge loss for the band because Stuart's musicianship and showmanship were a large part of the band's appeal. Nevertheless, the band persevered. At that time, Brownell retired from the band and the remaining members recruited bassist Mick Whitney, who is also from Anchorage. 36CF then relocated to the Seattle-Tacoma metropolitan area.

In 1997, the band released their second EP, Suffer Tree, on cassette. Later that year they self-published full-length demo CD, In the Skin. They next relocated to Portland, Oregon. In 1999, they released a four-song demo that, through their friends in Skinlab, ended up in the hands of Monte Conner, A&R rep at Roadrunner Records. In an interview with AntiHero Magazine, vocalist Brock Lindow states that the demo was produced by Steev Esquivel and Scott Sargeant of Skinlab.

=== Roadrunner Records years (2000–2007) ===
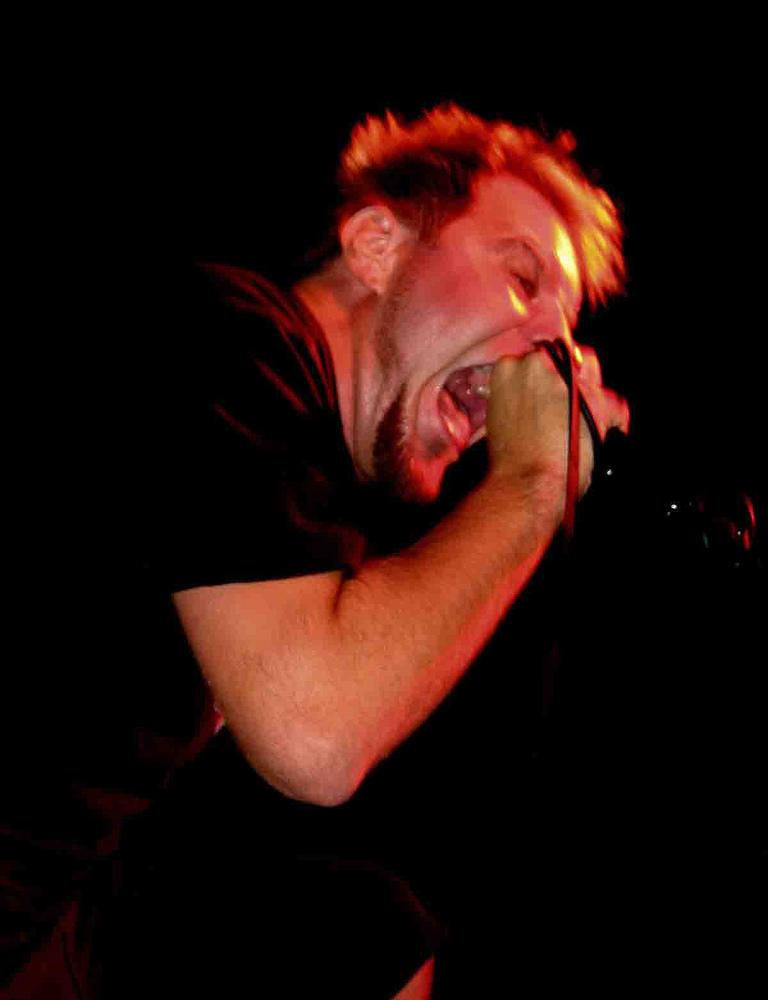
Vocalist Brock Lindow in 2006

Signed by Roadrunner Records in 2000, the band recorded their major debut album Bitterness the Star which was released on April 4, 2002. In support of its release they toured with bands such as Candiria, God Forbid, Chimaira, Diecast, and Hotwire. After touring the United States, they headed off to Europe to begin the European Road Rage Tour with Killswitch Engage and Five Pointe O.

The band re-emerged two years later, on March 16, 2004 with their second album A Snow Capped Romance which was produced by James Paul Wisner (who also produced albums for bands like Dashboard Confessional and As Friends Rust). They toured intensely behind the record (playing shows with acts like Killswitch Engage and Poison the Well) through December, taking two months off before beginning the work on their next album.

36 Crazyfists entered the studio with producer Sal Villanueva (who had worked with Thursday and Taking Back Sunday) in October 2005 to commence recording their third album Rest Inside the Flames, which was released across Europe on June 12, 2006. Ultimately, Roadrunner decided not to release the album in North America. A deal with DRT Entertainment was later struck, and the album received a belated release on November 7, 2006.

The album was a success in the UK, with Rest Inside the Flames debuting at No. 71 on the UK Albums Chart, and reaching No. 2 on the BBC's Rock Albums chart. However, the album only sold 1,858 copies in the US during its first week of release.

The band started an extensive UK tour, supported by Twelve Tribes and Your Rigamortus on April 1, 2007, where they played at 26 venues across the country.

=== Ferret Music years (2007–2014) ===
In May 2008 the band released The Tide and Its Takers on Ferret Music. They continue to play annually at the Summer Meltdown Festival in Anchorage, Alaska, except for 2008, when they were on tour with the first Annual Rockstar Mayhem Festival. Shortly after the Mayhem tour, bassist Mick Whitney left the band and was replaced by Brett Makowski.

36 Crazyfists filmed their show of January 9, 2009, in Anchorage, Alaska, for their first live DVD, Underneath a Northern Sky, released in October 2009.

The album Collisions and Castaways was released in the US by Ferret Music on July 27, 2010 and a day earlier in the rest of the world via Roadrunner Records. The album features guest appearances by Twelve Tribes frontman Adam Jackson (who also featured on their 2008 album The Tide and Its Takers), Raithon Clay of Plans to Make Perfect, and Brandon Davis from Across the Sun. Production duties for the album were handled by band guitarist Steve Holt and sport mixing from Andy Sneap.

The band played a variety of European festivals in June, including the UK Download Festival. 36 Crazyfists returned to the US in July to tour with Fear Factory, After the Burial, Divine Heresy, and Baptized in Blood.

In the UK the band re-signed with Roadrunner Records. Collisions and Castaways was released a day earlier on July 26. During this period, longtime drummer Thomas Noonan quietly left the band and was replaced by Kyle Baltus in 2012.

=== Time and Trauma, Lanterns and lineup changes (2014–2021) ===
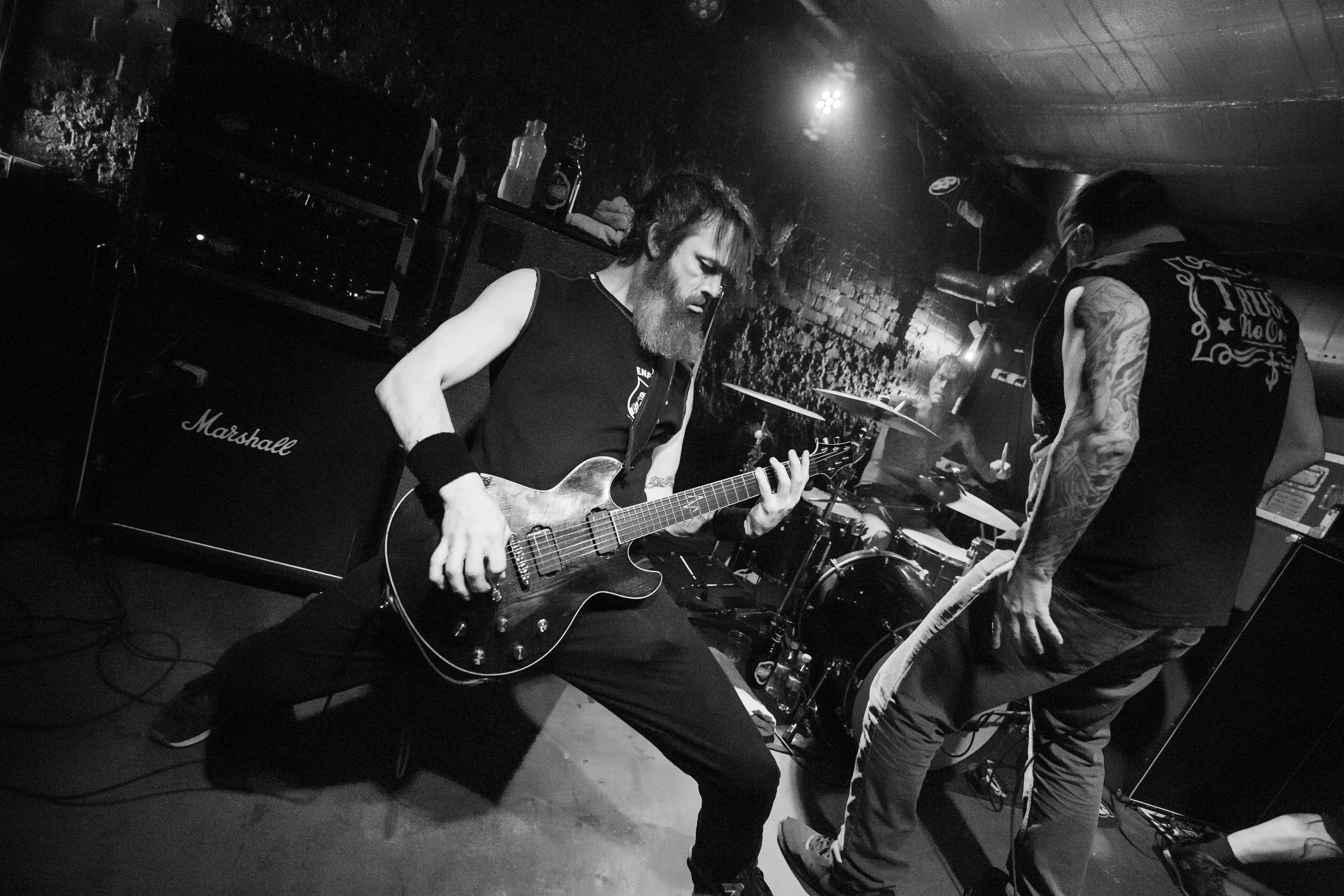
The band in 2018

During the UK tour at the end of 2013, the band debuted the title track for their seventh studio album, Time and Trauma. By mid-2014 the band had completed work on their new album for an early 2015 release. A listening party for the CD was held on July 24 at Pioneer Bar in Anchorage. Their seventh studio album Time and Trauma was released on February 17, 2015, via Spinefarm Records. Spinefarm Records also released the single "Also Am I" on their SoundCloud page.

On September 29, 2017, the band released their eighth studio album Lanterns on Spinefarm Records.

On March 19, 2021, Steven Holt posted on his personal Facebook profile in which he suggested that the band has disbanded. However, there has been no official confirmation, and less than two weeks prior, vocalist Brock Lindow confirmed that a new album was about half written. However, a few weeks later, it was reported that the band was continuing without Lindow, though there was also no official confirmation.

Lindow has since formed a new band called Paradise Slaves, who released their debut single "A Fever To Defeat" on October 30, 2024.

== Musical style and influences ==
36 Crazyfists have been described as metalcore, alternative metal and post-hardcore, as well as nu metal earlier in their career. According to Adam Rees of Metal Hammer, 36 Crazyfists occupies "a territory between jarring metalcore, nu metal's groove and the anthemic charge of post-hardcore". Their musical influences include bands such as Soundgarden, Alice In Chains, Killswitch Engage, Deftones, Metallica, Slayer, Testament, Pantera, Only Living Witness, Iggy Pop, The Stooges, Helmet, Quicksand, and Hum,

== Band members ==
Final lineup

- Brock Lindow – lead vocals (1994–2021)
- Steve Holt – guitars, backing vocals (1994–2021)
- Mick Whitney – bass (1996–2008, 2012–2021)
- Kyle Baltus – drums (2012–2021)

Former

- JD Stuart – bass (1994–1996; his death)
- Ryan Brownell – guitars (1994–1996)
- Thomas Noonan – drums (1994–2012)
- Brett "Buzzard" Makowski – bass (2008–2012)

== Discography ==
=== Studio albums ===
Year	Title	Label	Chart peaks				
Year	Title	Label	US	US Heat.	US Ind.	AUS	UK
2002	Bitterness the Star	Roadrunner	—	—	—	—	—
2004	A Snow Capped Romance	Roadrunner	—	21	—	—	—
2006	Rest Inside the Flames	DRT	—	—	—	53	71
2008	The Tide and Its Takers	Ferret	155	4	11	—	83
2010	Collisions and Castaways	Ferret / Roadrunner	161	3	25	47	85
2015	Time and Trauma	Spinefarm	—	2	13	56	61
2017	Lanterns	Spinefarm	—	3	—	—	—

=== EPs and demos ===
Released in 1995, Boss Buckle EP was the first EP released by the band. It was self produced by the band.

Boss Buckle EP
No.	Title	Length
1.	"BullyGutt"	3:17
2.	"Godline"	4:13
3.	"6 Feet"	3:56
4.	"KneeHigh"	3:53
5.	"Happy Day Riot"	3:22
Total length:		18:41

Released in 1997, Suffer Tree was the second EP released by the band. It was self produced by the band.

Suffer Tree
No.	Title	Length
1.	"Name Your Rapist"	4:42
2.	"Suffer Tree"	3:00
3.	"Eyes Of Lies"	3:30
4.	"This Is Why"	3:40
Total length:		14:52

In The Skin was a demo album released by 36 Crazyfists, released in 1997. It was self produced by the band.

In the Skin
No.	Title	Length
1.	"Enemy Throttle"	2:43
2.	"In The Skin"	4:24
3.	"Victim"	1:43
4.	"Eracism"	3:43
5.	"Half Myself"	3:53
6.	"Sworn"	3:55
7.	"Who's Next"	5:09
8.	"Clone"	3:14
9.	"East 15th"	1:20
10.	"Deprivation"	5:27
11.	"Crash Crew 93"	3:34
Total length:		39:05

Released in 1999, Demo '99 was the third EP released by the band. It was self produced by the band.

Demo '99
No.	Title	Length
1.	"Circle The Drain"	3:40
2.	"One More Word"	3:25
3.	"Chalk White"	3:18
Total length:		10:23

Released in 2008, The Oculus EP was the fourth EP released by the band.

The Oculus EP
No.	Title	Length
1.	"Absent Are The Saints"	3:52
2.	"We Gave It Hell"	3:13
3.	"Criminal Justice"	4:18
Total length:		11:23

=== Singles ===
Year	Song	Album
2002	"Slit Wrist Theory"	Bitterness the Star
2004	"At the End of August"	A Snow Capped Romance
2004	"Bloodwork"	A Snow Capped Romance
2005	"Destroy the Map"	A Snow Capped Romance
2006	"I'll Go Until My Heart Stops"	Rest Inside the Flames
2006	"On Any Given Night"	Rest Inside the Flames
2007	"Midnight Swim"	Rest Inside the Flames
2008	"Absent Are the Saints"	The Tide and Its Takers
2008	"We Gave It Hell"	The Tide and Its Takers
2010	"Reviver"	Collisions and Castaways
2010	"In the Midnights"	Collisions and Castaways
2014	"Also Am I"	Time and Trauma
2015	"Swing the Noose"	Time and Trauma
2016	"Renegades"	Non-album single
2017	"Death Eater"	Lanterns
2017	"Better to Burn"	Lanterns
2017	"Wars to Walk Away From"	Lanterns

=== Other releases ===
- 2002: Follow featuring Brock Lindow and Kyle Novak on vocals. Song by Family Tree on the album Family Tree 1 released on Excessive Use of the Force Records. Family Tree also features David Holt, brother of Steve Holt, on guitar synth and touch guitar.
- 2003: "At the End of August" – featured in MTV2's Headbangers Ball
- 2003: "Racecar" by Delmag featuring Brock Lindow. Delmag is the band of former 36CF guitarist Ryan Brownell.
- 2004: "Beauty Through the Eyes of a Predator" by Demon Hunter featuring Brock Lindow, on their album Summer of Darkness
- 2004: "Bloodwork" – featured in Resident Evil: Apocalypse Soundtrack
- 2004: "Workhorse" (Cast Iron Hike cover) – featured on Jäger Music Rarities Promotional Giveaway
- 2005: Fall Away featuring Brock Lindow, Sarah Pederson and Kyle Novak on vocals and Drawing Contact featuring Brock Lindow and Sarah Pederson on vocals – Both songs by Family Tree on the album Family Tree 2 released on Excessive Use of the Force Records. Family Tree also features David Holt, brother of Steve Holt, on drums, guitar synth and touch guitar
- 2005: Destroy the Map EP – released in connection with their 2005 April tour in the UK and Europe. Also includes "Workhorse" and "Sad Lisa" covers
- 2006: "I'll Go Until My Heart Stops" – featured in MTV2 Headbanger's Ball: The Revenge
- 2006: "Digging the Grave" (Faith No More cover) – featured on Kerrang! High Voltage and the iTunes version of Rest Inside the Flames
- 2010: "It Only Gets Harder from Here" by Witness the End featuring Brock Lindow on their self-titled EP
- 2011: "This Is My Nightmare" by Heart Attack High featuring Brock Lindow on their album The Honeymoon Is Over
- 2012 "Forever,Today" by Liquid Courage featuring Mick Whitney on Bass guitar and "War Paint" featuring Steve Holt on guitar. From the album "Take A Ride Inside Me" on Excessive Use Of The Force Records. Liquid Courage features David Holt, brother of Steve Holt on drums.
- 2019: "Voids" by Distance Defined featuring Brock Lindow on their album "Hollow Hearts"

== Videography ==
- "Slit Wrist Theory" – Bitterness the Star
- "At the End of August" – A Snow Capped Romance
- "Bloodwork" – A Snow Capped Romance
- "I'll Go Until My Heart Stops" – Rest Inside the Flames
- "We Gave It Hell" – The Tide and Its Takers
- "Reviver" – Collisions and Castaways
- "Also Am I" – Time and Trauma
- "Swing the Noose" – Time and Trauma
- "Death Eater" – Lanterns
- "Better to Burn" – Lanterns
- "Wars to Walk Away From" – Lanterns
- "Kenai Lanterns Tour" – Lanterns
- "Sleepsick" – Lanterns
