= Things We Lost in the Fire =

Things We Lost in the Fire may refer to:

- Things We Lost in the Fire (album), a 2001 album by Low
- Things We Lost in the Fire (film), a 2007 film starring Halle Berry and Benicio del Toro
- "Things We Lost in the Fire" (song), a 2013 song by Bastille
- "Things We Lost in the Fire" (Grey's Anatomy), a 2015 episode of the television show Grey's Anatomy
- Things We Lost in the Fire (story collection), a 2015 book by Mariana Enríquez
