= Time and Trauma =

Studio album by 36 Crazyfists
- Released: February 17, 2015
- Studio: High Voltage Sound (Portland, Oregon)
- Genre: Metalcore, alternative metal
- Length: 56:26
- Label: Spinefarm Records
- Producer: Steve Holt

36 Crazyfists chronology
Collisions and Castaways (2010)	Time and Trauma (2015)	Lanterns (2017)

Time and Trauma is the sixth studio album by American metal band 36 Crazyfists. The album was released in the UK on February 16, 2015 and on February 17, 2015 for the rest of the world. The album was included at number 42 on Rock Sound's top 50 releases of 2015 list.

== Track listing ==
All lyrics are written by Brock Lindow except "Silencer" by Brock Lindow & Adam Jackson (of Twelve Tribes) and "Marrow" by Brock Lindow & Stephanie Plate; all music is composed by 36 Crazyfists.

No.	Title	Length
1.	"Vanish"	3:50
2.	"11.24.11"	3:52
3.	"Sorrow Sings"	4:04
4.	"Lightless"	2:55
5.	"Time and Trauma"	4:07
6.	"Also Am I"	3:38
7.	"Translator"	4:01
8.	"Silencer" (featuring Adam Jackson)	4:47
9.	"Slivers"	3:44
10.	"Swing the Noose"	3:47
11.	"Gathering Bones" (featuring Kelly Acone)	4:34
12.	"Marrow" (featuring Stephanie Plate)	5:52
Total length:		56:26

Deluxe edition
No.	Title	Length
13.	"Edge of the End"	3:39
14.	"I, Erase"	3:36

== Personnel ==
- Brock Lindow – vocals
- Steve Holt – guitar, background vocals
- Mick Whitney – bass
- Kyle Baltus – drums

== Charts ==
Chart performance for Time and Trauma
Chart (2015)	Peak position
Australian Albums (ARIA)	56
UK Albums (OCC)	61
