= Red Tide (band) =

American metal band

- Origin: Avon, Connecticut, U.S.
- Genres: Thrash metal, progressive metal, jazz fusion
- Years active: 1992–2002
- Label: Encrypted Records
- Members: Jeff Wu; Justin Foley; Ian Kauffman; Matt "Blue" Ouellette
- Past members: Jeff Bennett; Andy Dickins; Andre Otero

Red Tide was an American thrash metal band, formed in 1992 by guitarist/vocalist Jeff Wu, bassist Jeff Bennett, and drummer Justin Foley. In those early high school days, they released three demos of pure hardcore/thrash metal. Red Tide went on to play the Simsbury High School Battle of the Bands in which they won first place. Noted as the first "real" metal band to play the event and the first band to play their own material vs covers.

In 1995, Red Tide took a turn in their musical direction. This was the time they began to experiment with jazz and fusion. This brought the departure of Jeff Bennett and introduction of Andy Dickins on bass. The new line up began to write music with an emphasis of jazz fusion thrown in. They went on to record one demo entitled "Expressions" which showcased their new eclectic style.

In 1996, Red Tide recruited Ian Kauffman on guitars. Now making the line up a four-piece. They continued to incorporate jazz fusion into their brand of aggressive style of metal and went into the studio to record another demo entitled "Hybrid".

In 1997, Red Tide went into the studio to record their first full-length Themes of the Cosmic Consciousness. This was a self-financed independent CD release. It gained in popularity through the help of the internet. In 1998, Andy Dickins leaves the band to pursue other interests.

Finally in 2001 Red Tide released their last effort Type II. This included Blue on bass. Shortly after this release Red Tide disbanded in 2002.

== Members ==
=== Last known lineup ===
- Jeff Wu – Guitars/Vocals (1992–2002)
- Justin Foley – Drums (1992–2002)
- Ian Kauffman – Guitars (1996–2002)
- Matt "Blue" Ouellette – Bass (1998–2002)

Previous

- Jeff Bennett – Bass (1992–1995)
- Andy Dickins – Bass (1995–1998)
- Andre Otero – Guitar (1995 Studio Session)
- Bryan – Guitar (1995–1996 Session player)

== Discography ==
- 1993: Peculiar Institution Demo
- 1994: The Ideal Creation Demo
- 1994: Steps to the End Demo
- 1995: Expressions Demo
- 1996: Hybrid Demo
- 1997: Themes of the Cosmic Consciousness
- 2001: Type II
