= John Sankey (drummer) =

Australian heavy metal drummer (born 1975)

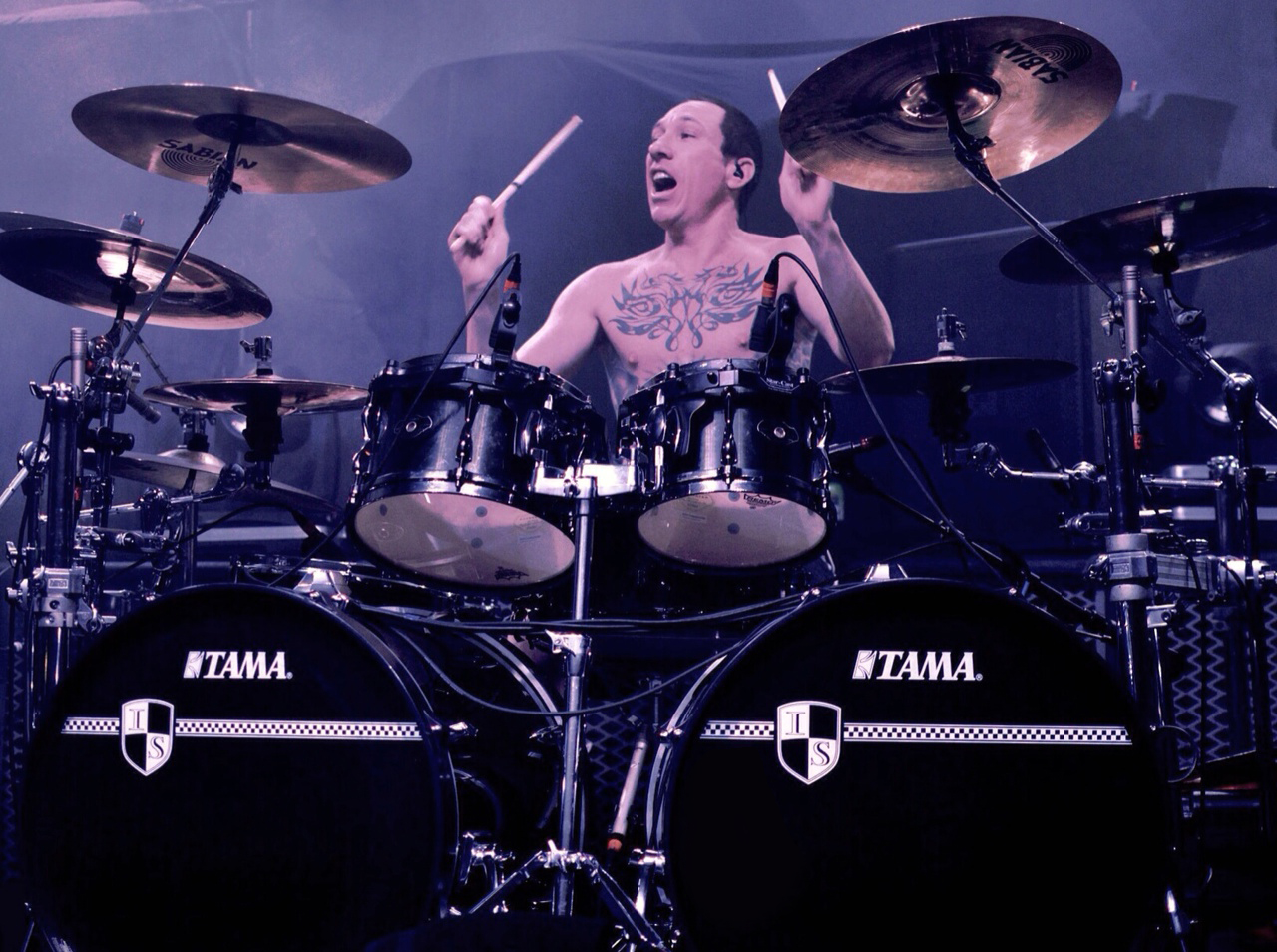

Background information
- Born: John Gerard Sankey; 21 July 1975 (age 51); Australia
- Genres: Technical death metal, industrial metal, nu metal, metalcore
- Instrument: Drums
- Years active: 1996–present

John Gerard Sankey (born 21 July 1975) is an Australian heavy metal drummer, best known as the drummer for Devolved and Devil You Know (now known as Light the Torch). He has also worked with numerous other high-profile bands including Fear Factory, Divine Heresy and Superheist.

== Career ==
In 2001, Sankey relocated from Australia to Los Angeles to begin a new band with Fear Factory guitarist Dino Cazares which became Divine Heresy. Sankey and Cazares also co-wrote music for the Roadrunner United album, meanwhile Sankey continued to write, record and tour America with his band Devolved. In 2012, Sankey joined forces with Howard Jones (ex-Killswitch Engage, Blood Has Been Shed) and Francesco Artusato (All Shall Perish) as co-founder and drummer of Devil You Know. In June 2016 it was announced that Sankey was no longer part of the band, for reasons unspecified and was replaced by former Trivium drummer Nick Augusto. In February 2017, Sankey joined Australian nu metal band Superheist as their new drummer and moved back to his homeland of Australia to pursue other career avenues.

In December 2015, Sankey started a 'replacement' multi city music festival to the diminished Soundwave Festival, called Legion Music Fest, to be held in January 2017. It is speculated that Sankey cancelled Legion and sold the rights to the Download Festival. Sankey relocated temporarily to the Gold Coast where he was co-owner / creator of the Meter Maids bar in Orchid Avenue Surfers Paradise which opened doors just prior to the 2018 Commonwealth Games. Sankey has since moved onto a career in Mortuary Science with his beloved cat, Biff.

== Personal life ==
Sankey lived in Los Angeles, California for 16 years before moving back to his home country, Australia. He currently resides in New South Wales where he now works as a mortician and continues to write and record music, and tour as the drummer for an Australian band called Superheist
