= Devolved (band) =

Australian death metal band

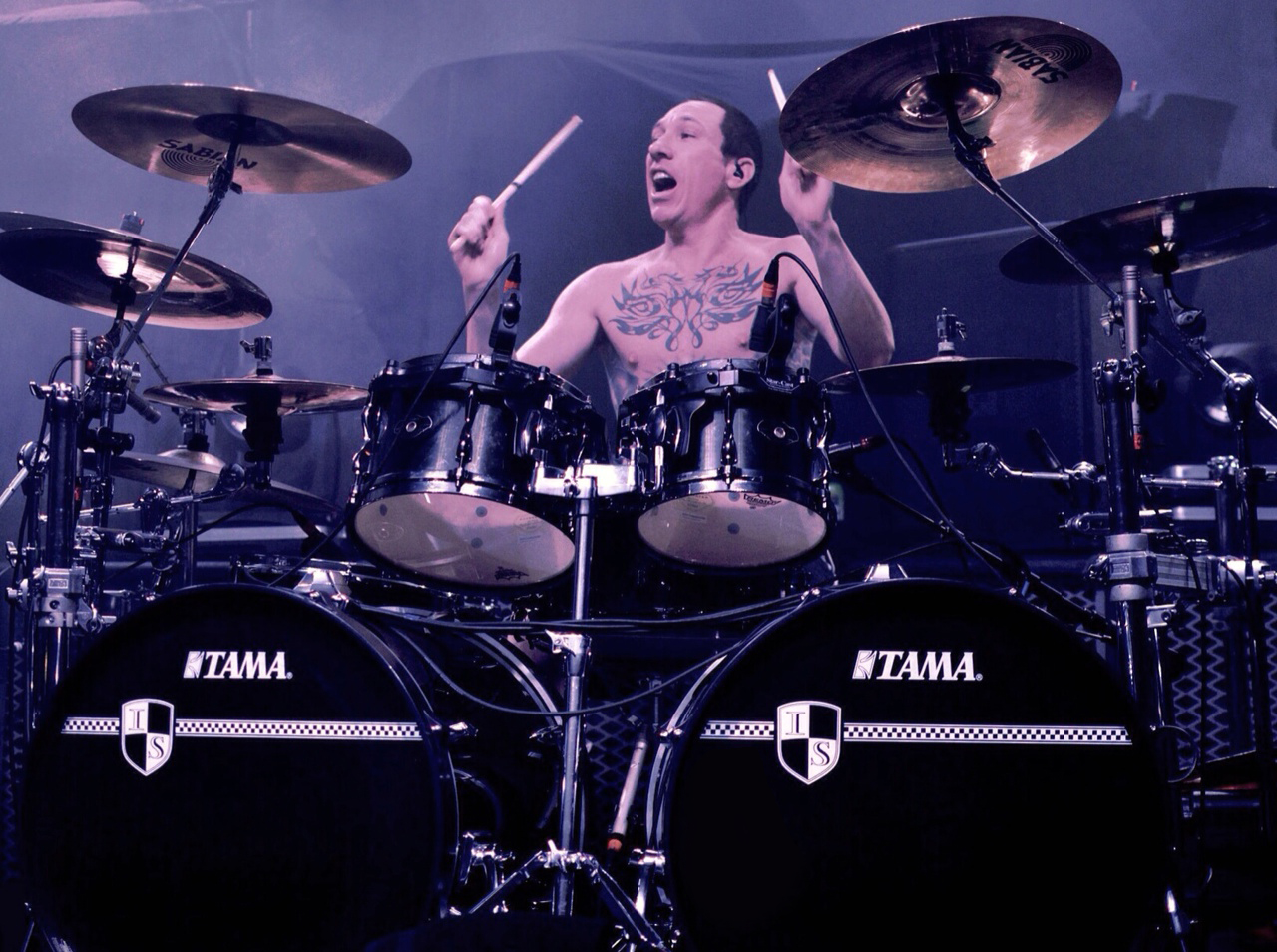

Background information
- Origin: Gold Coast, Queensland, Australia
- Genre: Technical death metal
- Years active: 1998–present
- Labels: Copro, Modern Music, Unique Leader
- Members: John Sankey; Arnold Arnett; Leo Perkins; Simon Durrant; Kris Marchant

Devolved is an Australian death metal band, led by drummer and lyricist John Sankey, originally from the Gold Coast, Queensland, then based in Los Angeles where Sankey resided for over 15 years. The band has released four full-length albums and has toured extensively throughout Australia, Europe, the United Kingdom, the United States and Japan.

== Band line-up ==
=== Current members ===
- John Sankey – drums, lyrics (1998–present)
- Simon Durrant – vocals (2020–present)
- Kris Marchant – guitars (2020–present)

=== Former/Touring members ===
- Brett Noordin – guitars, lyrics (1998–2011)
- Leighton Kearns – bass (2002, 2005–2008)
- Nik Carpenter − lead vocals (1998–2005)
- Joel Graham − bass, vocals (1998–2001)
- Mark Walpole − guitar, effects (1998–2004)
- Wayde Dunn – bass (2003–2005)
- Patrick Brown − samples, sound manipulation (2004–2008)
- Brett Carpio – guitars (2004–2008)
- Kyle Zemanek – lead vocals (2005–2011)
- Chad Combs – vocals, samples (2005-2007)
- Hal Berkstresser – bass, effects (2008–2011)
- Anthony Sabatino – samples, keyboards (2008–2011)
- Mark Haggblad – vocals (2011–2020)
- Mark Hawkins – guitars (2011–2020), bass (2011–2019)

== Discography ==
- Technologies (2001)
- Calculated (2004)
- Oblivion (2011)
- Reprisal (2012)

== Videography ==
- Distorted (2001)
- Vex (2004)
- Fractured (2009)

== See also ==
- Australian heavy metal
- Technical death metal
